= S.T.R.E.E.T. D.A.D. =

Studio album by Out Hud
- Released: November 4, 2002
- Genres: Post-rock; indietronica; new wave; synth-pop
- Length: 38:54
- Label: Kranky

Out Hud chronology
S.T.R.E.E.T. D.A.D. (2002)	Let Us Never Speak of It Again (2005)

Professional ratings
Aggregate scores
Source	Rating
Metacritic	84/100
Review scores
Source	Rating
AllMusic	4/5 stars
Alternative Press	4/5 stars
Blender	3/5 stars
The Boston Phoenix	3/4 stars
Pitchfork	9.0/10
Rolling Stone	3.5/5 stars
Spin	8/10
Stylus	B+
Tiny Mix Tapes	3.5/5 stars
Uncut	4/5 stars

S.T.R.E.E.T. D.A.D. is the debut album by American electronic dance rock band Out Hud.

== Composition ==
S.T.R.E.E.T. D.A.D. has been musically aligned with post-rock, with applause given to its uniquely "danceable" take on the genre. Tiny Mix Tapes saw the group "ably" work in an '80s new wave aesthetic, recalling bands like ABC, Duran Duran, and A Flock of Seagulls. Other styles seen include electro, indie rock, and neo-disco. Spin dubbed it "a synth-pop idyll".

== Critical reception and legacy ==
Calling it "equally cerebral and hip-shaking", AllMusic's Andy Kellman applauded S.T.R.E.E.T. D.A.D. as "an incredibly creative fusion of several styles of music that ends up sounding like no one else in particular". Pitchfork's Eric Carr praised the album's "remarkable substance" through "darkly evocative compositions…filled with unspoken imagery and emotion." It was awarded the site's Best New Music accolade.

More than ten years after its release, Stereogum's Sam Hockley-Smith revisited D.A.D. in the site's Backtrack column. He dubbed it "an ominous, funny and often very deep" album, claiming that it spoke to "the uncertain times we perpetually inhabit". In 2021, Pitchfork credited the album with spreading dance-punk music alongside works by other bands like !!! and Liars.

== Accolades ==
Publication	List	Rank	Ref.
Complex	The 100 Best Albums of the 2000s	-	

== Track listing ==
No.	Title	Length
1.	"Story of the Whole Thing"	4:58
2.	"Dad, There's a Little Phrase Called Too Much Information"	7:30
3.	"This Bum's Paid"	5:04
4.	"Hair Dude, You're Stepping on My Mystique"	4:20
5.	"The L Train Is a Swell Train and I Don't Want to Hear You Indies Complain"	12:19
6.	"Two Nads (Dad Reprise)"	4:43

== Personnel ==
Sourced from AllMusic and Discogs.

Out Hud

- Tyler Pope - guitar (tracks: 1–4, 6), drum programming (2, 5, 6), bass guitar (5)
- Nic Offer - bass guitar (1, 3, 4), keyboards (2, 5, 6), acoustic guitar (5)
- Molly Schnick - violin (1), cello (1, 3, 4), keyboards (2, 5, 6); artwork
- Phyllis Forbes - drums (1, 3, 4), bass guitar (2, 6), guitar (5)
- Justin Van Der Volgen - mixing
