= Space Island =

Space island or variation, may refer to:

== In general ==
- Space station
- Space habitat
- Habitable planet

== Specific aerospace projects ==
- Hilton Space Islands, a proposed space hotel chain
- Space Island Group (SIG), a space infrastructure company
  - SIG Space Island Project, a proposed space infrastructure project

== Other ==
- Islands of Space (novel), a 1957 U.S. science fiction novel by John W. Campbell
- Treasure Island in Outer Space (aka Space Island), a 1987 TV miniseries
- Space Island (album), fourth album of New Zealanders band Broods released on February 18th, 2022
- "Space Island" (song), a tune from the soundtrack album for Coffee Prince (2007 TV series)
- Space Island (fictional location), a stage from the videogame series My Singing Monsters
- Space Island (film), an unmade 1950s Universal Pictures film competing with Conquest of Space

== See also ==
- Space Island One (TV show), a 1998 TV series
- "Theme from Space Island" (song), a tune by !!! from 2004 album Louden Up Now
