= Light Asylum =

American electronic music duo

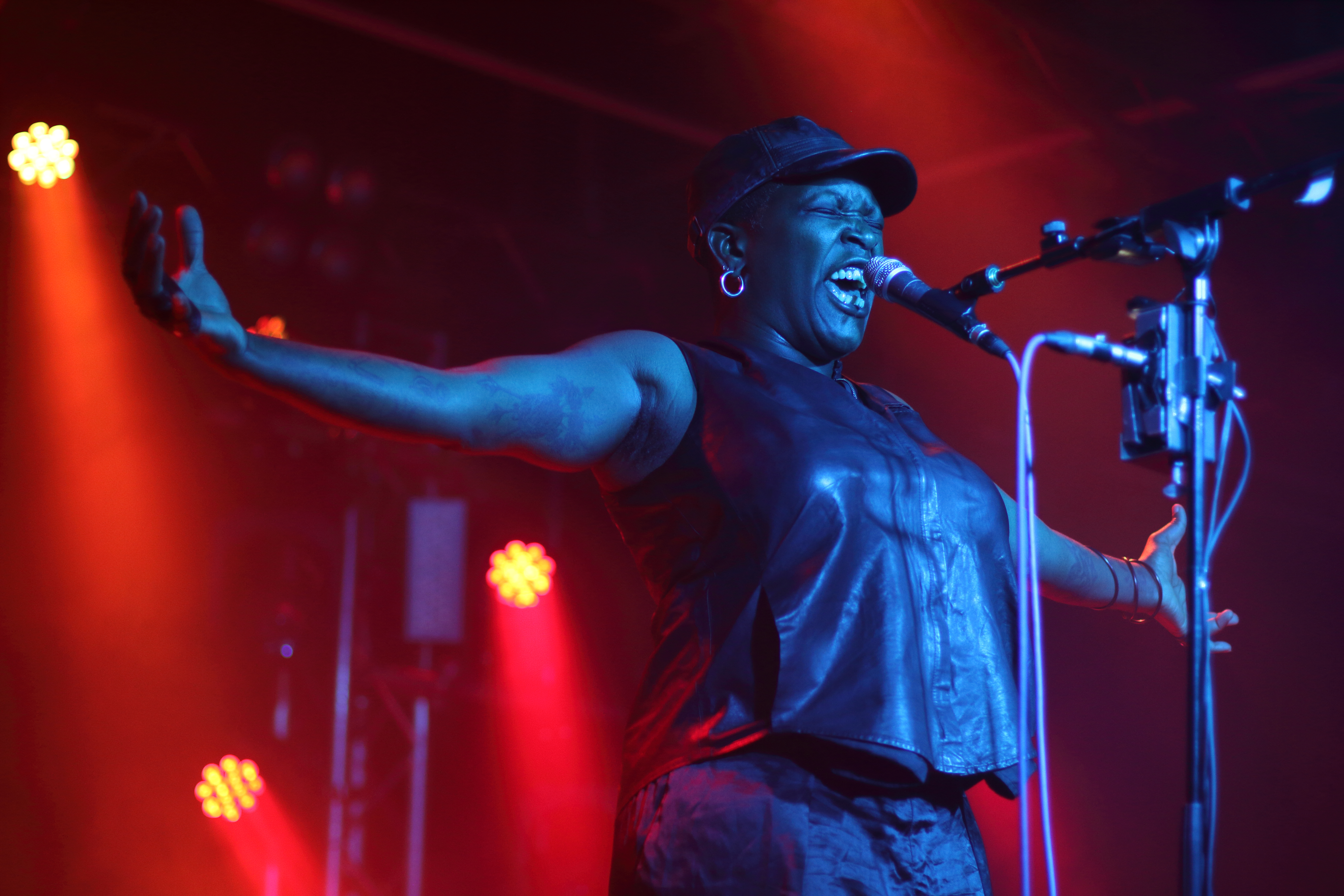

Background information
- Origin: Brooklyn, New York, United States
- Genres: Post-punk, synthpop, darkwave
- Years active: 2010–present
- Labels: Mexican Summer, Cooperative Music
- Members: Shannon Funchess
- Past members: Bruno Coviello

Light Asylum is a Portland, Oregon-based electronic music project from Shannon Funchess. Originally from Brooklyn, New York before moving to Portland.

Her music is heavily influenced by 1980s music and incorporates elements of darkwave, synthpop and post-punk. The Guardian compared Light Asylum to Nine Inch Nails and Depeche Mode.

== History ==
Funchess founded Light Asylum in 2007 and asked Bruno Coviello to join as keyboard player after hearing him play guitar for a friend's project.

The band released their first EP In Tension in 2010. The four-track EP was re-released in 2011 through indie label Mexican Summer. Their self-titled début album was released in May 2012. It received generally positive reviews from Pitchfork, Fact, Mixmag, NME, XLR8R and The Quietus.

Coviello left the project in 2012 shortly after the debut LP was released to pursue other things.

Funchess has provided vocals for acts such as TV on the Radio, !!! and Telepathe. Funchess also collaborated with The Knife on the track "Stay Out Here" from the band's fourth album Shaking the Habitual in 2013.

Light Asylum's song "Dark Allies" was used as the theme song of the 2019 podcast The Ballad of Billy Balls.

In 2022, Light Asylum performed at the Cold Waves music festival in Chicago and played two new songs. Funchess promised "new music soon."

== Discography ==
=== Studio albums ===
- Light Asylum (2012)

=== Extended plays ===
- In Tension (2010)

=== Singles ===
- "Shallow Tears" (2012)
- "Heart of Dust" (2012)
- "A Certain Person" (2012)
