= Vidago Palace (TV series) =

- Genre: Drama
- Directed by: Henrique Oliveira
- Starring: Mikaela Lupu; David Seijo; Pedro Barroso
- Country of origin: Portugal
- Original language: Portuguese
- No. of seasons: 1
- No. of episodes: 6

Production
- Production location: Vidago
- Running time: 50 minutes
- Production companies: Hop!; Portocabo

Original release
- Network: RTP1
- Release: March 30 – May 4, 2017

Vidago Palace is a 2017 Portuguese mini-series, which originally aired on RTP1 and TVG. The show is a historical drama set in 1936; the series was both set and filmed in the Vidago Palace Hotel in Vidago. The plot follows a love triangle focused on Mikaela Lupu's Carlota and centers on class conflict. The series was RTP1's highest rated in three years.

== Cast ==
Actor/Actress	Character
Mikaela Lupu	Carlota de Vimieiro
David Seijo	Pedro Souto
Pedro Barroso	César da Silva
Anabela Teixeira	Lívia de Vimieiro
Margarida Marinho	Benvinda da Silva
Almeno Gonçalves	Conde de Caria
João Didelet	Bonifácio da Silva
Marcantonio Del Carlo	Martim de Vimieiro
Beatriz Barosa	São da Silva
Maria Henrique	Gertrudes
Custódia Gallego	Cremilde
Sérgio Praia	Lopes
Pedro Mendonça	Samuel Cohen
Jacob Jan de Graaf	Taylor
David Amor	Pepe
David Novas	Xoan
Sheyla Fariña	Dolores Câncio
Antonio Mourelos	Alberto
Cristina Homem de Mello	Julia
Xosé A. Touriñán	Padre Raimundo
Susana Mendes	Natasha
Eva Fernández	Xenoveva
Pedro Roquette Almeida	David Taylor
Ricardo Leite	Cerdeira
Bruno Schiappa	Florian Klotz
Mariana Magalhães	Rosa
