= Strange Weather, Isn't It? =

Studio album by !!!
- Released: August 24, 2010
- Genre: Dance-punk
- Length: 40:44
- Label: Warp
- Producers: Eric Broucek; !!!

!!! chronology
Myth Takes (2007)	Strange Weather, Isn't It? (2010)	Thr!!!er (2013)

Strange Weather, Isn't It? is the fourth album by dance-punk group !!!, released on August 24, 2010, on Warp Records. The album's first single, "AM/FM", was made available as a free download from the band's website and was released on limited edition clear vinyl on July 13, 2010.

== Critical reception ==
Professional ratings
Aggregate scores
Source	Rating
AnyDecentMusic?	6.6/10
Metacritic	67/100
Review scores
Source	Rating
AllMusic	4/5 stars
Alternative Press	3.5/5 stars
The A.V. Club	B
Billboard	3.5/5 stars
Mojo	3/5 stars
NME	7/10
Pitchfork	6.9/10
Q	3/5 stars
Spin	6/10
Uncut	3/5 stars

Metacritic rates Strange Weather, Isn't It? as 67 out of 100, stating it has "generally favorable reviews" based on 26 critic scores.

- Pitchfork (Larry Fitzmaurice) – "The album's more engaging moments stand out . . . but the general disparity of these few-and-far-between moments amidst the record's more driftless filler sadly cements the fate of Strange Weather, Isn't It?: you'll enjoy it plenty while it's on, but once it's over you might forget it ever existed."
- musicOMH (Luke Winkie) – "It's practically a soundtrack for pool parties, clubs, and makeshift living room dance sessions. The album knows exactly what it wants to do, and accomplishes it with grace. You're not going to find nine songs that will keep your hips moving quite like these."
- Slant Magazine (Kevin Liedel) – "If Strange Weather, Isn't It? achieves anything, it's blind, technical dedication to beat-centric music. Like a drum machine left on play and then abandoned by its programmer, the album is relentless in its speed to go nowhere, pounding and tapping and clicking with nothing more than artificial purpose. . . Simply put, Strange Weather, Isn't It? is beat for the sake of beat."

== Track listing ==
No.	Title	Length
1.	"AM/FM"	4:55
2.	"The Most Certain Sure"	5:39
3.	"Wannagain Wannagain"	3:50
4.	"Jamie, My Intentions Are Bass"	5:06
5.	"Steady as the Sidewalk Cracks"	4:25
6.	"Hollow"	2:48
7.	"Jump Back"	3:21
8.	"Even Judas Gave Jesus a Kiss"	5:45
9.	"The Hammer"	4:54
Total length:		40:44

Bonus tracks
No.	Title	Length
10.	"Blue" (iTunes bonus track)	5:25
11.	"Made of Money" (Japan CD bonus track)	3:07

== Personnel ==
- Nic Offer – vocals, keyboards, guitar
- Justin Van Der Volgen – guitar (track 6), effects (track 2)
- Mario Andreoni – guitar, bass
- Tyler Pope – guitar, bass
- Allan Wilson – keyboards, saxophone, percussion
- Guy Licatta (tracks 1 to 5), Jerry Fuchs (track 9), Paul Quattrone (tracks 1, 3, 6 to 8) – drums
- Clarice Jensen – cello
- Jason Disu, Nick Roseboro – horns
- Daniel Gorman – keyboards
- Caito Sanchez – percussions
- Nadia Sirota – viola
- Caleb Burhausm, Yuki Numata – violin
- Ifeoluwa Babalola (tracks 5, 6, 8), Olivia Mori (track 1), Shannon Funchess (tracks 3 to 5, 8) – vocals

== Charts ==
Chart performance for Strange Weather, Isn't It?
Chart (2010)	Peak position
Belgian Albums (Ultratop Wallonia)	86
French Albums (SNEP)	112
Japanese Albums (Oricon)	54
US Top Dance Albums (Billboard)	13
