= Louden Up Now =

Studio album by !!!
- Released: June 7, 2004
- Genre: Dance-punk
- Length: 48:27
- Labels: Touch and Go, Warp
- Producer: !!!

!!! chronology
| !!! (2001) | Louden Up Now (2004) | Take Ecstasy with Me/Get Up (2005) |

Singles from Louden Up Now
- 1. "Me and Giuliani Down by the School Yard (A True Story)" Released: 2003; 2. "Pardon My Freedom" Released: 2004; 3. "Hello? Is This Thing On?" Released: 2004; 4. "Me and Giuliani Down by the School Yard (A Remix)" Released: 2004

Professional ratings
Aggregate scores
| Source | Rating |
|---|---|
| Metacritic | 75/100 |
Review scores
| Source | Rating |
| AllMusic | 4.5/5 stars |
| Alternative Press | 4/5 |
| Blender | 4/5 stars |
| Entertainment Weekly | B |
| Mojo | 4/5 stars |
| NME | 7/10 |
| Pitchfork | 7.0/10 |
| Q | 4/5 stars |
| Rolling Stone | 3/5 stars |
| Spin | C+ |

Louden Up Now is the second studio album by American dance-punk band !!!. Released on June 7, 2004, through Touch and Go Records in the United States and Warp Records in the rest of the world, the album was greeted by mainly positive reviews from critics, with AllMusic hailing it as "a modern-day agit-pop indie dance-rock classic." Louden Up Now sees the group continue to meld funky dance rhythms with post-punk influences.

Originally one edition of the album included a bonus disc containing a clean version. The LP edition track listing is the same as the CD version, although track 10 is omitted. Side one is tracks 1 and 2, side two is tracks 3 to 5, side three is tracks 6 and 7, and side four is tracks 8 and 9. A two-disc version was released in some countries containing 4 additional tracks on a second disc. One of the tracks was "Sunday 5.17 AM", which was later rerecorded for Myth Takes as "Yadnus".

Two singles were released from the album: "Hello? Is This Thing On?" and "Pardon My Freedom" while the 2003 single "Me and Giuliani Down by the Schoolyard" was included on the release.

== Track listing ==
Louden Up Now track listing
| No. | Title | Length |
|---|---|---|
| 1. | "When the Going Gets Tough, the Tough Get Karazzee" | 6:17 |
| 2. | "Pardon My Freedom" | 5:51 |
| 3. | "Dear Can" | 4:37 |
| 4. | "King's Weed" | 1:19 |
| 5. | "Hello? Is This Thing On?" | 7:33 |
| 6. | "Shit Scheisse Merde, Pt. 1" | 5:06 |
| 7. | "Shit Scheisse Merde, Pt. 2" | 6:10 |
| 8. | "Me and Giuliani Down by the School Yard (A True Story)" | 9:03 |
| 9. | "Theme from Space Island" | 2:31 |
| 10. | "Shit Scheisse Merde, Pt. 1 (Instrumental)" | 4:41 |

Bonus disc
| No. | Title | Length |
|---|---|---|
| 1. | "Sunday 5:17 AM" | 5:13 |
| 2. | "Dear Can" (Maurice Fulton Vocal Mix) | 4:47 |
| 3. | "When the Going Gets Tough, the Tough Gets Karazee" (Serious Bonus Beats Mix) | 6:59 |
| 4. | "Pardon My Freedom" (Maurice Fulton Instr. Mix) | 5:55 |

== Personnel ==
- Mario Andreoni – bass, guitar
- Justin Van Der Volgen – bass
- Tyler Pope – drum programming, bass, drums, percussion, keyboards, guitar
- John Pugh XI – drums, vocals, gong, percussion
- Gorman Dan – keyboards, percussion, trumpet
- Nic Offer – vocals, keyboards
- Allan Wilson – saxophone, keyboards, percussion

== Charts ==
Chart performance for Louden Up Now
| Chart (2004) | Peak position |
|---|---|
| Belgian Albums (Ultratop Wallonia) | 66 |
| French Albums (SNEP) | 169 |
| UK Albums (OCC) | 135 |
| US Top Dance Albums (Billboard) | 4 |
