= One Girl / One Boy =

Single by !!!

from the album Thr!!!er
- Released: April 2, 2013
- Recorded: Public Hi-Fi Studios (Austin, Texas)
- Genre: Disco-punk; indie rock
- Length: 4:03 (album version); 3:32 (radio edit)
- Label: Warp
- Songwriter(s): Mario Andreoni; Nic Offer; Paul Quattrone; Rafael Cohen
- Producer(s): Jim Eno

!!! singles chronology
"Slyd" (2013)	"One Girl / One Boy" (2013)	"All U Writers" (2015)

"One Girl / One Boy" is a song by American rock band !!!. It was released as the second single from their fifth studio album, Thr!!!er, on April 2, 2013. A music video for the song was also released on May 15. The song peaked at number 87 on the Belgian Flanders Tip chart and was featured on the fictional Radio Mirror Park radio station in the video game Grand Theft Auto V.

The song features backup vocals and a verse sung by Austin, Texas singer Sonia Moore.

== Music video ==
The official music video for "One Girl / One Boy", lasting three minutes and twenty seconds was uploaded onto the band's official YouTube channel on May 15, 2013. The director of the video was credited as Alan Smithee.

== Track listing ==
=== Digital download ===
- Warp — WARPDD236B

No.	Title	Length
1.	"One Girl / One Boy"	4:03

=== CD ===
- Warp — WARPCD236RP

No.	Title	Length
1.	"One Girl / One Boy" (radio edit)	3:32
2.	"One Girl / One Boy" (album version)	4:03

== Charts ==
Chart (2013)	Peak position
Belgium (Ultratip Bubbling Under Flanders)	87

== Release history ==
Region	Date	Label	Format	Catalogue no.
Worldwide	April 2, 2013	Warp	Digital download	WARPDD236B
United Kingdom	May 20, 2013	Warp	CD	WARPCD236RP
