= Slo-Mo =

Slo-Mo is short for slow motion, a filmmaking technique. It may also refer to:

- Mike Brenner, a Philadelphia musician
- SloMo (Chanel song)
- Slo-Mo (drug)
- "Slo Mo", a song by Cutterpillow
- "Slo Mo", a song by !!! from Wallop
