= Thr!!!er =

Studio album by !!!
- Released: April 29, 2013
- Genre: Dance-punk; indie rock
- Length: 39:50
- Label: Warp
- Producer: !!!; Jim Eno; Jas Shaw; Patrick Ford

!!! chronology
Strange Weather, Isn't It? (2010)	Thr!!!er (2013)	As If (2015)

Singles from Thr!!!er
- 1. "Slyd" Released: February 12, 2013; 2. "One Girl / One Boy" Released: April 2, 2013

Professional ratings
Aggregate scores
Source	Rating
AnyDecentMusic?	6.8/10
Metacritic	71/100
Review scores
Source	Rating
AllMusic	4.5/5 stars
Alternative Press	3.5/5 stars
The A.V. Club	B
Exclaim!	8/10
Mojo	3/5 stars
NME	6/10
Pitchfork	6.0/10
PopMatters	8/10
Q	3/5 stars
Uncut	7/10

Thr!!!er (stylized as THR!!!ER, pronounced Thriller) is the fifth studio album by American rock band !!!. It was released in 2013 through Warp.

The title is a reference to Michael Jackson's album Thriller, which guitarist Mario Andreoni described as "synonymous with an artist(s)' and/or genre(s)' artistic high-watermark."

== Track listing ==
No.	Title	Length
1.	"Even When the Water's Cold"	3:48
2.	"Get That Rhythm Right"	5:06
3.	"One Girl / One Boy"	4:04
4.	"Fine Fine Fine"	3:54
5.	"Slyd"	4:15
6.	"Californiyeah"	4:34
7.	"Except Death"	4:37
8.	"Careful"	5:37
9.	"Station (Meet Me at The)"	3:55
Total length:		39:50

Japanese CD bonus track
No.	Title	Length
10.	"Midnight at the Blur"	4:57

== Personnel ==
- Rafael Cohen – vocals, bass, guitars, keyboards
- Nic Offer – vocals, keyboards
- Mario Andreoni – guitar, bass, keyboards
- Allan Wilson – saxophone, keyboards, percussion, background vocals
- Daniel Gorman – keyboards, background vocals
- Paul Quattrone – drums
- Chase Jarvis – photography

== Charts ==
Chart performance for Thr!!!er
Chart (2013)	Peak position
Belgian Albums (Ultratop Flanders)	119
Belgian Albums (Ultratop Wallonia)	100
French Albums (SNEP)	117
Japanese Albums (Oricon)	62
UK Albums (OCC)	121
US Top Dance Albums (Billboard)	18
