= !!! (album) =

Studio album by !!!
- Released: 2000
- Genre: Post-punk revival
- Length: 45:27
- Label: Gold Standard
- Producers: !!!, Justin Van Der Volgen

!!! chronology
| !!! (2000) | Louden Up Now (2004) |

!!! is the debut studio album by the American band !!!. It was released in 2000 on Gold Standard Laboratories on vinyl, and saw wide release on CD on 19 June 2001.

== Reception ==
Professional ratings
Review scores
| Source | Rating |
|---|---|
| AllMusic | 3.5/5 stars |
| The Indianapolis Star | 3.5/4 stars |
| Stylus Magazine | B− |

The Indianapolis Star wrote that "the band's hybrid sound recalls both Big Audio Dynamite (even Nic [Offer]'s vocals are reminiscent of Clash veteran Mick Jones) and the experimental spirit of the Jon Spencer Blues Explosion."

Johnny Loftus of AllMusic stated: "On this [album], !!! trash the axiom that says bands influenced by angular post-punk must be populated by dour misanthropes who sport wallet photos of Ian Curtis. Highly recommended."

== Track listing ==
=== CD version ===
!!! track listing
| No. | Title | Length |
|---|---|---|
| 1. | "The Step" | 6:08 |
| 2. | "Hammerhead" | 5:04 |
| 3. | "KooKooKa Fuk-U" | 7:26 |
| 4. | "Storm the Legion" | 5:48 |
| 5. | "There's No Fucking Rules, Dude" | 8:49 |
| 6. | "Intensify" | 6:54 |
| 7. | "Feel Good Hit of the Fall" | 5:15 |

=== LP version ===
Side one
| No. | Title | Length |
|---|---|---|
| 1. | "The Step" | 6:08 |
| 2. | "Hammerhead" | 5:04 |
| 3. | "Storm the Legion" | 5:48 |
| 4. | "Feel Good Hit of the Fall" | 5:15 |

Side two
| No. | Title | Length |
|---|---|---|
| 1. | "Intensify" | 6:54 |
| 2. | "KooKooKa Fuk-U" | 7:26 |
| 3. | "There's No Fucking Rules, Dude" | 8:49 |

== Personnel ==
- Mario Andreoni – guitar
- Justin Van Der Volgen – bass
- Nic Offer – vocals
- Dan Gorman – trumpet, percussion
- Tyler Pope – guitar
- Allan Wilson – saxophone, percussion
- John Pugh – drums, percussion
