= Light Asylum (album) =

Studio album by Light Asylum
- Released: May 1, 2012
- Recorded: 2011–2012
- Studios: Gary's Electric Studio (Brooklyn, New York); Stratosphere Sound (New York City)
- Genres: Synth-pop; dark wave
- Length: 48:27
- Label: Mexican Summer
- Producer: Light Asylum

Light Asylum chronology
In Tension (2010)	Light Asylum (2012)

Singles from Light Asylum
- 1. "Shallow Tears" Released: 2012

Light Asylum is the only full-length studio album by American electronic music duo Light Asylum. It was released on May 1, 2012, via Mexican Summer. Recording sessions took place at Gary's Electric Studio in Brooklyn in January 2012 and at Stratosphere Sound in New York in 2011. Production was handled by members Shannon Funchess and Bruno Coviello.

The song "A Certain Person" was previously released on the duo's 2010 In Tension extended play. Its accompanying music video was directed by Eden Batki and Shannon Funchess. "Shallow Tears", the lead single off of the album, can be heard in the first episode of 2019 television series Russian Doll. A music video for "Heart of Dust" was directed by Grant Worth and David Riley.

== Critical reception ==
Professional ratings
Aggregate scores
Source	Rating
Metacritic	65/100
Review scores
Source	Rating
AllMusic	4/5 stars
Consequence of Sound	C−
DIY	3/5 stars
Mixmag	3/5
NME	4/5 stars
Pitchfork	6.1/10
PopMatters	6/10
Spectrum Culture	3.75/5
Spin	8/10
Under the Radar	7/10 stars

Light Asylum was met with generally favourable reviews from music critics. At Metacritic, which assigns a normalized rating out of 100 to reviews from mainstream publications, the album received an average score of 65 based on fourteen reviews.

AllMusic's Heather Phares wrote: "it's not for the faint of heart, but anyone partial to heavy, brooding, uncompromising music will likely be gladly carried away by it". Priya Elan of NME called it "a thrilling joy ride of an album". Puja Patel of Spin resumed: "Brooklyn darkwave duo fuel electro-goth rage with industrial beat-machines and amorphous Grace Jones swag". Writing for The Line of Best Fit, Sharon Kean drew comparisons to New Order and OMD, observing a "powerful and intriguing record, dark and mysterious, and filled with bottomless pools of reflection that are just waiting to be discovered".

Michael Merline of Spectrum Culture wrote: "Light Asylum is an album of utterly enthralling moments stretched out to the point of breaking, their repetitive tension lending one headphone banger after another the kind of exhausting gravity Funchess seems to be mining better than anyone else out there. It's all pretty overwhelming, but totally worth ending up a sweaty, exhausted heap at the end". Austin Trunick of Under the Radar also praised the album, writing "Light Asylum has made a stellar debut album, but it's clear this singer's full potential hasn't yet been tapped". Zach Kelly of Pitchfork concluded: "part of what makes listening to Light Asylum so frustrating is a nagging want to see her talent mobilized to the fullest, to roll up your sleeves and try to make a Light Asylum in your own image".

In mixed reviews, Alex Young of Consequence stated: "Light Asylum is intimidating, but the band's goth pop comes with an undeniable groove that's still easy to enjoy". Digby Bodenham of DIY found "there is a willful lack of originality on the album in so much as at times it has such a faithful synth-pop sound that you'd be forgiven for thinking it's a 1980s reissue". Stephen Worthy of Mixmag resumed: "Funchess' extraordinary voice will get much attention, but this is the full package". Brice Ezell of PopMatters summed up with "despite its imperfections, Light Asylum is a must-listen for those interested in synth-pop or the Brooklyn scene in general, and Light Asylum are a band worth keeping on the radar".

== Track listing ==
All tracks are written by Shannon Funchess and Bruno Coviello.

Light Asylum track listing
No.	Title	Length
1.	"Hour Fortress"	4:46
2.	"Pope Will Roll"	4:36
3.	"IPC"	5:34
4.	"Heart of Dust"	3:53
5.	"Sins of the Flesh"	5:34
6.	"Angel Tongue"	6:40
7.	"Shallow Tears"	5:08
8.	"At Will"	3:36
9.	"End of Days"	4:14
10.	"A Certain Person"	4:26
Total length:		48:27

== Personnel ==
- Shannon Funchess – songwriter, performer, producer, mixing, design, layout
- Bruno Coviello Jr. – songwriter, performer, producer, mixing
- Al Carlson – saxophone (track 5), recording, mixing
- Chris Coady – recording and mixing (track 7)
- Matt Boynton – mixing (track 10)
- Eliot Lee Hazel – photography
- Cezary Zacharewicz – photography
- Emilxa Xurylowicz – photography
- Wayne Harrison – design, layout
