= Wallop (album) =

Studio album by !!!
- Released: August 30, 2019
- Studios: Taaffe Palace; Seed2sky; Belgrade Youth Center (Belgrade); Jamie Harley's Pad
- Length: 45:12
- Label: Warp
- Producers: !!!; Patrick Ford; Cole M.G.N.; Graham Walsh; Mark Bengtson (add.)

!!! chronology
Shake the Shudder (2017)	Wallop (2019)	Let It Be Blue (2022)

Singles from Wallop
- 1. "UR Paranoid" / "Off the Grid" Released: May 30, 2019; 2. "Serbia Drums" Released: June 19, 2019; 3. "This Is the Door" Released: August 6, 2019; 4. "Couldn't Have Known" Released: August 27, 2019

Wallop is the eighth studio album by American dance-punk group !!!. It was released on August 30, 2019, by Warp Records. It was recorded primarily in Brooklyn at frontman Nic Offer's apartment. It features vocal contributions by Meah Pace, Cameron Mesirow, Angus Andrew of Liars and Maria Uzor of Sink Ya Teeth.

== Release ==
The double A-side single "UR Paranoid" / "Off the Grid" was released on May 30, 2019. Wallop was announced on June 19, 2019, alongside the release of "Serbia Drums" as a single. "This Is the Door" was released as a single on August 6, 2019. "Couldn't Have Known" was released as the album's final single on August 27, 2019.

== Reception ==
Professional ratings
Aggregate scores
Source	Rating
Metacritic	69/100
Review scores
Source	Rating
AllMusic	3/5 stars
DIY	3/5 stars
Exclaim!	7/10
The Line of Best Fit	8.5/10
Mojo	3/5 stars
NME	3/5 stars
Pitchfork	7.2/10
PopMatters	8/10
Uncut	6/10
Under the Radar	6.5/10

At Metacritic, which assigns a normalized rating out of 100 to reviews from professional publications, the album received an average score of 69, based on 10 reviews.

Jesse Dorris of Pitchfork praised the album as a successful blend of 1990s-inspired sounds, writing that the "best parts of Wallop are its most emotional", and singling out "Domino" as being "among the prettiest and most intelligent songs !!! have ever recorded" and "This Is the Door" for balancing its nostalgia and being "a hell of a showcase for Meah Pace". Kitty Richardson of The Line of Best Fit gave the album a rating of 8.5 out of 10, writing, "Wallop is so confident in its ecclecticism, but it really impresses when the more simplistic, unpretentious urge to move hips and raise hands takes the fore." Paul Carr of PopMatters gave the album a favorable review, writing, "The peaks are some of their most pointedly thrilling to date, and even the less immediate tracks gradually reveal subtle new shades. The result is one of the band's most consistently interesting and cohesive albums to date." Zahraa Hmood of Exclaim! gave the album a positive review, writing, "Occasionally on Wallop, !!! sound either too world-weary or too committed to being incendiary to relay ideas relevant to listeners. But at their best, the band maintain their convictions about privilege, power and culture and present them as defiant, monumental tracks." DIY's Chris Taylor found Wallop to be the "closest they've been for quite a while" to making an album that feels "complete".

Andrew Trendell of NME wrote, "There's something about the genre-smashing vibrance of the peaks of Wallop that makes it feel so joyous and essentially in the now", highlighting several tracks for their energy, but crictizing the moments of "filler" material around those tracks as hampering the album's consistency and preventing it from reaching the level suggested by its strongest moments. Tim Sendra of AllMusic called the album muted and over-produced compared to what he felt was the band's hot streak of other 2010s albums. Sendra reserved praise for tracks featuring Meah Pace, but ultimately concluded that Wallop was the group's weakest album to date. Jason Anderson of Uncut gave the album a rating of 6 out of 10, writing that "genuinely surprising moments are scarcer on much of Wallop, with rudimentary workouts outnumbering the fresher like of "$50 Million" and its super-charged Chic groove."

== Track listing ==
Credits adapted from the liner notes of Wallop.

No.	Title	Writer(s)	Producer(s)	Length
1.	"Let It Change U"	Rafael Cohen; Nic Offer	!!!; Patrick Ford	3:18
2.	"Couldn't Have Known"	Cohen	!!!; Cole M.G.N.; Bart Migal^{[b]}	3:35
3.	"Off the Grid" (featuring Meah Pace)	Offer; Cohen; Angus Andrew; Mario Andreoni	!!!; Graham Walsh; Mark Bengtson^{[a]}	3:48
4.	"In the Grid"	Offer; Cohen; Andrew; Andreoni	!!!; Walsh; Bengtson^{[a]}	1:26
5.	"Serbia Drums"	Cohen; Offer; Chris Egan	!!!; Walsh; Ford^{[a]}; Migal^{[b]}	3:39
6.	"My Fault"	Offer; Cohen; Egan; Andreoni	!!!; Migal^{[b]}	3:39
7.	"Slow Motion"	Cohen; Offer; Maria Uzor	!!!; Walsh	3:45
8.	"Slo Mo"	Cohen; Offer; Uzor	!!!; Walsh	0:38
9.	"$50 Million"	Offer; Andreoni; Cohen; Chris Egan; Dan Gorman	!!!; Walsh	3:56
10.	"Domino"	Offer; Cohen	!!!; Walsh	3:41
11.	"Rhythm of the Gravity"	Cohen; Offer	!!!; Cole M.G.N.; Ford	3:24
12.	"UR Paranoid"	Offer	!!!	4:17
13.	"This Is the Door" (featuring Meah Pace)	Cohen; Offer; Patrick Ford; Meah Pace	!!!; Walsh; Ford; Migal^{[b]}	3:52
14.	"This Is the Dub"	Cohen; Offer; Ford; Pace	!!!; Walsh; Ford; Migal^{[b]}	2:14
Total length:				45:12

Notes

- ^{^[a]} signifies an additional producer.
- ^{^[b]} signifies a vocal producer.

== Personnel ==
Performance

- Nic Offer – vocals, keyboards, drum programming
- Rafael Cohen – vocals, guitar, bass, keyboards, drum programming
- Mario Andreoni – guitar, bass, keyboards, drum programming
- Dan Gorman – keyboards, trumpet
- Chris Egan – drums
- Meah Pace – additional vocals (2–6, 9, 13, 14)
- Angus Andrew – additional vocals (3, 4)
- Molly Schnick – additional vocals (5)
- Amanda Lovejoy Street – additional vocals (7, 8)
- Cameron Mesirow – additional vocals (7, 8), additional synth (12)
- Maria Uzor – additional vocals (7, 8)
- Nicole Fayu – additional vocals (7, 8)
- Robbie Lee – saxophone (13, 14)
- Sam Kulik – trombone (13, 14)
- Kenny Warren – trumpet (13, 14)

Technical

- Mark Bengtson – recording (1–6, 9, 11, 13, 14), additional production (3, 4)
- Bart Migal – vocal production (2, 5, 6, 13, 14)
- Chris Egan – recording (5)
- Matt Wiggins – mixing (1–9, 11–14)
- Justin Van Der Volgen – mixing (10)
- Josh Bonati – mastering
- Caleb Halter – design

== Charts ==
Chart performance for Wallop
Chart (2019)	Peak position
Japanese Albums (Oricon)	166
