= UTC+04:30 =

Time offset from UTC

- Time zone
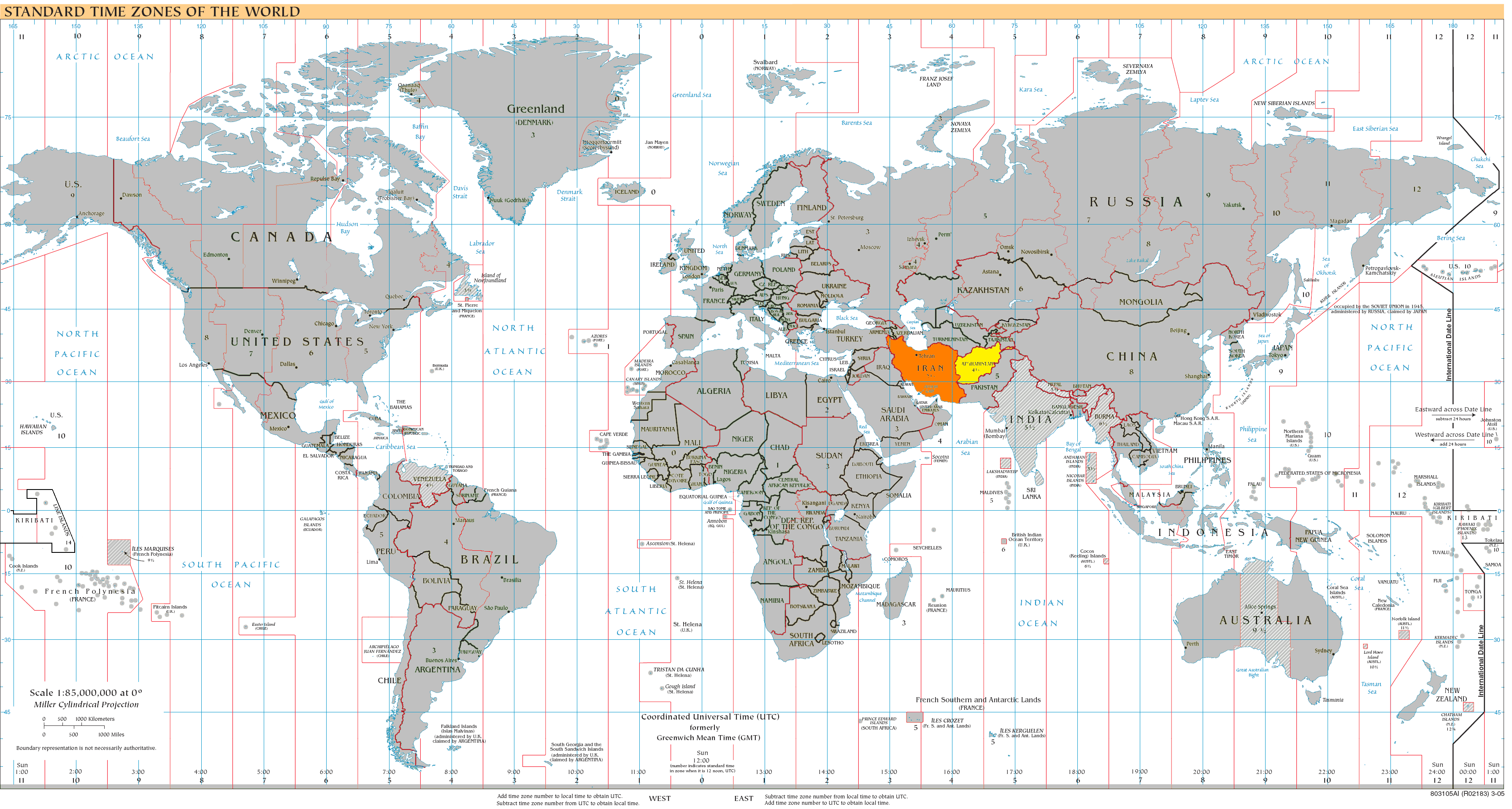
- World map with the time zone highlighted Year-round Northern Hemisphere summer (Until 2022)

UTC offset
- UTC: UTC+04:30

Current time
- 01:57, 28 July 2026 UTC+04:30 [refresh]

Central meridian
- 67.5 degrees E

Date-time group
- D*

UTC+04:30 is an identifier for a time offset from UTC of +04:30.

Time in the Middle East: Offset / Zone(s); UTC+2 / Eastern European Time; Israel Standard Time; Palestine Standard Time; UTC+3 / Eastern European Summer Time; Israel Summer Time; Palestine Summer Time; UTC+3 / Arabia Standard Time; Turkey Time; UTC+3:30 / Iran Standard Time; UTC+4 / Gulf Standard Time; Standard time observed all year Daylight saving time observed

== As standard time (year-round) ==
=== South-Central Asia ===
Principal cities: Kabul, Kandahar, Herat, Mazar-i-Sharif

- Afghanistan – Afghanistan Time (AFT)

== Historical time offsets ==
=== Western Asia (Middle East) ===
Principal cities: Tehran, Kerman, Isfahan, Tabriz, Karaj, Shiraz, Ahvaz, Mashhad, Kermanshah, Urmia, Rasht, Zahedan, Hamadan, Bandar Abbas, Yazd, Ardabil, Zanjan, Arak, Nishapur, Sari, Khorramabad, Sanandaj, Shahr-e Kurd, Qazvin, Gorgan, Bojnord, Bushehr, Birjand, Ilam, Semnan, Yasuj, Bam

- Iran – Iran Daylight Time (IRDT) until 2022
