= Mikaela Lupu =

Portuguese actress

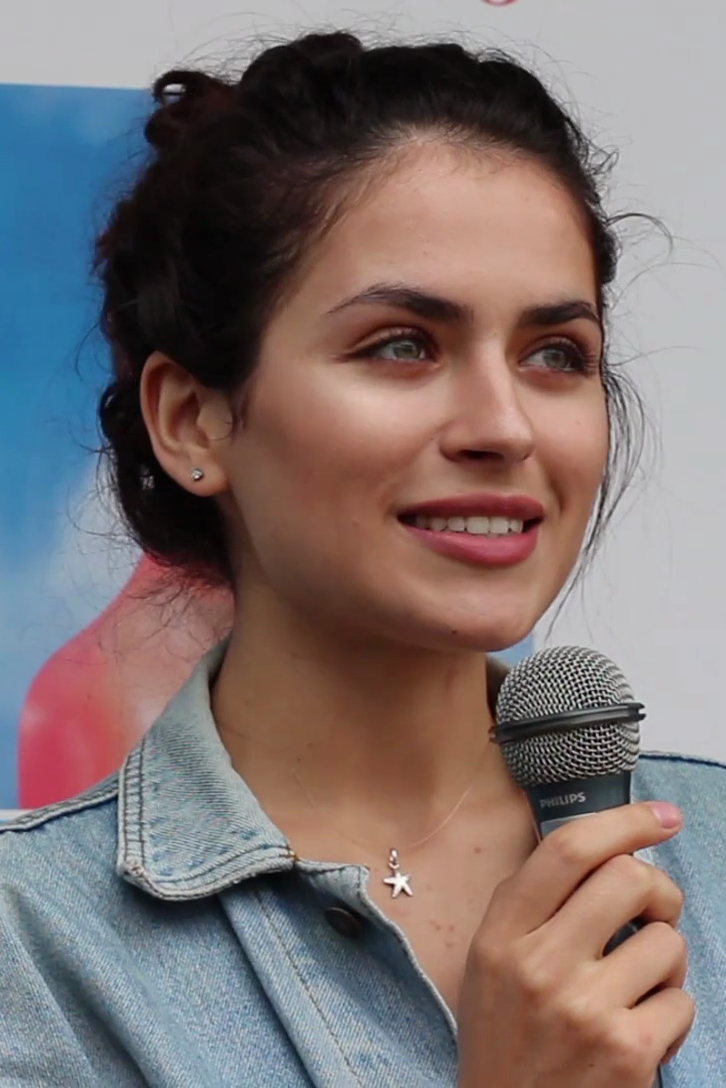
- Mikaela Lupu in 2018
- Born: September 16, 1995 (age 30); Moldova
- Citizenship: Moldovan
- Occupation: Actress
- Years active: 2011–present
- Known for: Morangos com Açúcar
- Partner: Nuno Lopes (2017–2018)

Mikaela Lupu (born September 16, 1995) is a Portuguese actress born in Moldova. She is best known for her roles as Teresa in the television telenovela Morangos com Açúcar and Sofia Fontes in the portuguese telenovela A Impostora,

== Early life ==
Mikaela Lupu was born in Moldova and moved to Portugal when she was five years old as her parents were hired to work as crane operators.

== Career ==
Lupu started her career in 2011 when she was selected to play the role of an anorexic girl called Teresa in Morangos com Açúcar. She played a character called Cila Medeiros, a drug dealer's girlfriend in Mundo ao Contrário in 2013. She plays the role of Maria in O Beijo do Escorpião and had small participation in the TV show Os Filhos do Rock.

== Personal life ==
In 2017, she publicly announced a relationship with Portuguese actor Nuno Lopes. They broke off their relationship a year later.

== Filmography ==
=== Film ===
Year	Title	Role	Notes
2017	O Dia da Exaltação	Maria da Conceição	Short film
2018	Adelaide	Julia Paixão	
2019	Calcamar	Lia	Short film

=== Television ===
Year	Title	Role	Notes
2011–2012	Morangos com Açúcar	Teresa Soares	Season 9
2013	1 + 1	Marta	
2013	Mundo ao Contrário	Cila Medeiros	
2014	Os Filhos do Rock	Girl	
2014	O Beijo do Escorpião	Maria Santos	
2015	Jardins Proibidos	Carlota	
2016	Dentro	Soraia	
2016–2017	A Impostora	Sofia Fontes	
2017	Vidago Palace	Carlota	
2019	Teorias da Conspiração	Felipa	
2020	Nazaré	Vânia	
