= Super Bock =

Portuguese beer brand

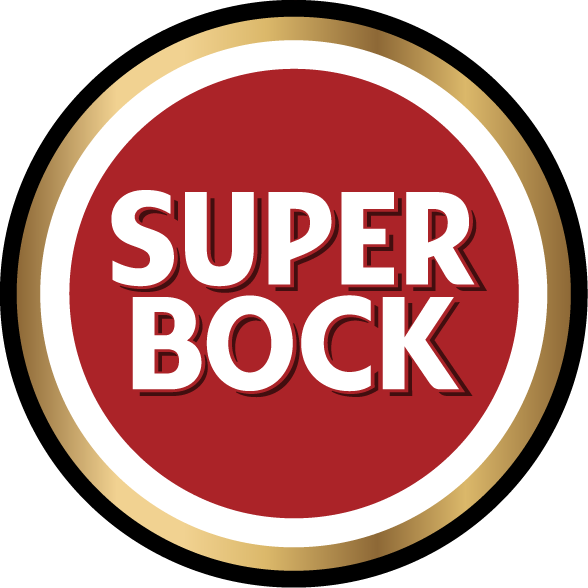

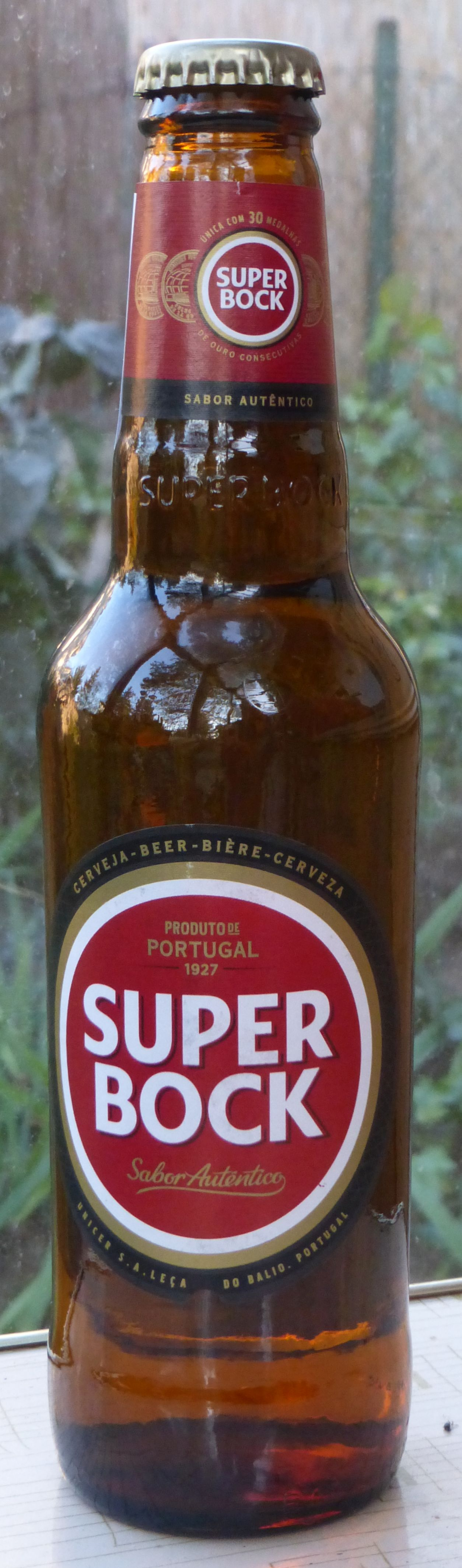
- Location: Leça do Balio (Matosinhos), Portugal
- Opened: November 9, 1927; 99 years ago
- Owner: Super Bock Group
- Website: www.superbock.pt/en

Active beers
Name	Type
Super Bock Original	Pilsner
Super Bock Stout	Sweet Stout
Super Bock Green	Beer with lemon juice
Super Bock Abadia	Belgian Abbey
Super Bock Sem Glúten	Gluten free Pilsner
Super Bock Free sem álcool	Non-alcoholic Pilsner
Super Bock Free Preta sem álcool	Non-alcoholic Black

Super Bock is a Portuguese beer brand from the Super Bock Group brewery which produces a range of beers under the same name. Established in 1927, Super Bock maintains a leading position in the Portuguese market. It is also the best-selling Portuguese beer in the world.

== History ==
The Super Bock brand was born in 1927, launched as a "winter beer", directly entering the list of prestigious beers. Super Bock, even before being registered, won its first prize in 1926, in its presentation at the Industrial Exhibition at Palácio de Cristal, winning the gold medal.

- 1942 - In the midst of World War II, Super Bock is produced entirely with national malt, due to navigation difficulties that lead to the use of 100% national malts for beer production, for the first time
- 1964 - Inauguration of the new production center in Leça do Balio with a capacity of 25 million liters per year, where the Super Bock and the other brands of (then) CUFP will be produced.
- 1967 - The first ads appear under the slogan "The beer that exceeds your requirements"
- 1972 - The distribution and quality network is inaugurated in Lisbon, consisting of 12 trucks
- 1986 - Super Bock reaches the leadership of the Portuguese market, remaining in the preference of beer consumers to this day.
- 1995 - Super Bock is the first Portuguese brand to name a festival, the Super Bock Super Rock, one of the biggest Music festivals in Portugal.
- 1998 and 2001 - Sponsors what are two of the biggest Portuguese cultural events ever: Expo98 and Porto 2001 (European Capital of Culture)
- 2003 - Launch of the Super Bock Stout, which in three months sold five million liters, the estimated value for one year
- 2004 - Launch of Super Bock Green creating a new segment in the Portuguese beer market: beer mixers.
- 2005 - Marks the entry into the non-alcoholic beers segment, with the Super Bock Twin.
- 2006 - Launch of Super Bock Tango, the first "gooseberry beer" produced in Portugal and Abadia, a craft beer recipe.
- 2007- Super Bock presented the first Portuguese beer bottle made entirely of aluminium. and the new range of non-alcoholic Super Bock beers – created through a partnership with the Chemical Engineering Department of Porto University's Faculty of Engineering
- 2008 - Abadia Ruby and Gold beers – gourmet limited editions
- 2009 - Super Bock Mini with easy opening – a system, which eliminates the need for a bottle opener
- 2010 - IceBocks went on sale – a box to which ice can be added to cool the mini beers, Super Bock Verão was launched, a low-alcohol beer.
- 2011 - Launch of Super Bock Classic.
- 2012 - Super Bock went through a market repositioning process, with a new slogan, "Life is Super".
- 2013 - Super Bock Selecção 1927 was launched, a range of craft beers in limited and seasonal editions.
- 2015 - the slogan was changed to "Super Bock takes Friendship Seriously". In October of the same year the visitor centre "Super Bock House of Beer" was inaugurated, located in the Production Centre of Leça do Balio, where it is possible to observe the brewing process, learn about the raw materials, as well as the stories and facts about Super Bock beer.
- 2017 - Super Bock marks its 90th anniversary with a new advertising campaign (this campaign will win the Gold trophy the following year in the XIV Communication Effectiveness Awards), a commemorative beer that recreates the iconic bottle of the 60s, and a series of activations throughout the year, with the signature "90 years of making friends". It is also during this year that the company changes its name to Super Bock Group.
- 2018 - Reinforcement of the range of special beers with the launch of the new Super Bock Coruja brand, a beer that aims to democratize access to brewing varieties, side by side with innovation, through the "dry hopping" process (intensifies the aroma and sensory experience), combined with a strong image and a creative advertising campaign, markedly marked its entry into the market.
- 2020 - launch of Super Bock Without Gluten - the first national beer without gluten approved by the Portuguese Association of Celiacs and the new limited edition Super Bock Oktober Edition inspired by the biggest Volksfest in the world, Oktoberfest.
- 2021 - In line with the new needs imposed by the pandemic scenario, Super Bock launches the campaign "Friends friends, beers apart"
- Annually, since 1993, the brand sponsors the countdown to the New Year on Portuguese television.

== Internationalisation ==
Super Bock has made a strong commitment to internationalisation, having established itself as the best-selling Portuguese beer in the world It is currently present in more than 50 countries, with China leading the list, followed by European countries, including England, France, Switzerland and Spain where Galicia has the largest consumption of the Super Bock Non-Alcoholic Black variety. The rise in these markets offsets the fall in older markets in Africa, such as Angola and Mozambique.

== Brands ==
In a strategy to diversify the brand's flavors, Super Bock has launched, in recent years, a new and varied range of products, currently offering in the Portuguese market:

- Super Bock: Original.
- Super Bock Stout: Black beer.
- Super Bock Free: Available in Original and Black versions.
- Super Bock sem Gluten: Gluten free.
- Super Bock Green: Beer with lemon juice.
- Super Bock Abadia: Beer with a reddish tone with a rich aroma of special malts and caramel.
- Super Bock Selection 1927: Range of craft beers.
- Super Bock Coruja: Range of beer with aromas accentuated by Dry Hopping.
- Super Bock Alcohol Free 0.0%

== Distinctions ==
Super Bock was the first Portuguese beer to receive the Quality Certificate by SGS ICS (International Certification Services).

Super Bock won its first grand prize at the Portuguese Industrial Exhibition held at the Palácio de Cristal do Porto in October 1926, even before being a registered trademark. Since 1975, Super Bock has competed in the international competition Monde Selection de la Qualité, in which by 2020, the Super Bock Original has 46 medals won, 44 of which are gold (1977, 1978, 1979, 1980, 1981, 1982, 1984 to 2021 and 38 of them consecutive (1984 to 2021).

The Super Bock Stout has also been awarded several times, having won in 2021 at the Monde Selection de la Qualitè, the most prestigious trophy in the International High Quality Trophy, for having achieved the highest quality standards for three consecutive years. Super Bock Green accumulates 1 Grand Gold Medal, 2 Gold Medals and 2 Silver Medals. The Abadia variety, launched in 2006, achieved the first medal in the first year in which it entered the competition (2007)

In 2005, Super Bock won two awards in the 1st edition of the Advertising Effectiveness Awards and got the best result ever in terms of notability, according to data presented to the jury of the Effectiveness Awards. Super Bock Green Campaign by Tempo OMD won the gold award. Launched in 2004, this beer created a new segment in the beverage market in Portugal – the flavoured beers – thus constituting a challenge for the company and bringing a new dynamic to the category.

In 2012, Super Bock was also distinguished for the activation campaigns at the point of sale, during the 1st edition of the POPAI Awards

In 2018, Super Bock wins the Gold trophy at the XIV Communication Effectiveness Awards, for the 2017 advertising campaign, "90 years of making friends", created to celebrate the 90th anniversary of the brand.

== Sponsorships ==
Super Bock sponsors Porto Film Festival, Fantasporto, since 1989.

Super Bock was the brand responsible for the activation of summer festivals in Portugal, with the launch in 1995 of Super Bock Super Rock – a festival that from its beginning attracted some of the most prestigious bands and solo performers to Portugal.

In addition to Super Bock Super Rock, the Super Bock brand is present in major festivals and musical events that take place in Portugal. It is also the official beer of various regional celebrations in both the north and south of the country – in Viana do Castelo, Ponte de Lima, Porto, Lisbon, among many others. Super Bock is also a familiar brand for students, being the sponsor of major academic events at a national level.

In 1998, Super Bock was the official sponsor of Expo'98 (1998 Lisbon World Exhibition), one of the largest Portuguese events, which attracted about 11 million visitors and was considered the best World Exhibition ever by BIE (the intergovernmental organization in charge of overseeing and regulating World Expos). In 2001, the brand sponsored the Porto 2001 (European Capital of Culture), committing once again to the promotion of cultural events.

In 2009, the first edition of the National Creative Industries Prize was promoted, a pioneering initiative in Portugal, organized by Unicer, today associated with Super Bock, and Serralves Foundation, which seeks to receive, evaluate and distinguish Portuguese products, services and brands that contribute to economic and social development of the country.

In 2012, Super Bock was the official sponsor of the 7 Wonders – Beaches of Portugal initiative.

Super Bock has also invested heavily in sport, through the sponsorship of football teams such as FC Porto, with a link of 3 decades and Sporting CP, which already has 12 years of commitment

== See also ==
- Beer and breweries by region
