= Let Us Never Speak of It Again =

Studio album by Out Hud
- Released: March 21, 2005
- Genre: Electronica; experimental
- Length: 51:11
- Label: Kranky

Out Hud chronology
| S.T.R.E.E.T. D.A.D. (2002) | Let Us Never Speak of It Again (2005) |

Professional ratings
Aggregate scores
| Source | Rating |
|---|---|
| Metacritic | 76/100 |
Review scores
| Source | Rating |
| AllMusic | 4.5/5 stars |
| Blender | 3/5 stars |
| Mojo | 3/5 stars |
| NME | 8/10 |
| Pitchfork | 8.0/10 |
| Rolling Stone | 3/5 stars |
| Spin | A− |
| Uncut | 4/5 stars |

Let Us Never Speak of It Again is the second and final studio album by American electronic band Out Hud, released in 2005.

Unlike the band's debut, which was an almost completely instrumental affair, Let Us Never Speak of It Again shifts more towards tech house/dance-pop, adding vocals by drummer Phyllis Forbes and cellist Molly Schnick. While received fairly favorably, some reviewers lamented the shift, calling it a step back from their debut. Their song "How Long" appeared in the 2007 movie I Know Who Killed Me, starring Lindsay Lohan.

== Track listing ==
| No. | Title | Length |
|---|---|---|
| 1. | "This Just In (Intro)" | 0:28 |
| 2. | "It's for You" | 4:50 |
| 3. | "One Life to Leave" | 5:13 |
| 4. | "Old Nude" | 4:24 |
| 5. | "The Song So Good They Named It Thrice" | 8:04 |
| 6. | "How Long" | 4:54 |
| 7. | "2005: A Face Odyssey" | 6:42 |
| 8. | "The Zillionth Watt" | 1:47 |
| 9. | "Dear Mr. Bush, There Are Over 100 Words for Shit and Only 1 for Music. Fuck You, Out Hud" | 11:35 |
| 10. | "The Stoked American" | 3:15 |
