= As If (album) =

Studio album by !!!
- Released: October 16, 2015
- Genres: Dance-punk; indie rock; dance; disco
- Length: 51:25
- Label: Warp
- Producers: !!!; Jim Eno; Patrick Ford

!!! chronology
Thr!!!er (2013)	As If (2015)	Shake the Shudder (2017)

Singles from As If
- 1. "All U Writers" Released: April 28, 2015; 2. "Freedom! '15" Released: July 30, 2015; 3. "Bam City" Released: September 30, 2015; 4. "Ooo" Released: November 16, 2015; 5. "Every Little Bit Counts" Released: January 29, 2016

As If is the sixth studio album by American dance-punk group !!!, released on October 16, 2015, on Warp Records.

== Singles ==
Three official singles were released from As If. "All U Writers", featuring vocals from Teresa Eggers, released 28 April 2015. "Freedom '15" released 30 July 2015, featuring vocals from Yolanda Harris Dancy and Taletha Manor; a lyric video was uploaded 20 August 2015. The third single from the album, "Bam City", was released 30 September 2015, with an accompanying music video. "Ooo" was released with an accompanying music video on November 16, 2015.

One promotional single was released from As If: "Sick Ass Moon", an "R&B-tinted house track", released with "Freedom '15" on 30 July 2015.

== Critical reception ==
Professional ratings
Aggregate scores
Source	Rating
Metacritic	74/100
Review scores
Source	Rating
AllMusic	4/5 stars
Clash	7/10
Consequence of Sound	C
Drowned in Sound	8/10
Exclaim!	8/10
Mojo	4/5 stars
NME	6/10
Pitchfork	6.9/10
Q	4/5 stars
Uncut	6/10

In a positive review for Exclaim!, Daniel Sylvester called the album "one of the most enjoyable, if schizophrenic, dance albums of the year."

== Track listing ==
No.	Title	Length
1.	"All U Writers"	4:53
2.	"Sick Ass Moon"	4:21
3.	"Every Little Bit Counts"	3:14
4.	"Freedom! '15"	6:00
5.	"Ooo"	3:44
6.	"All the Way"	4:36
7.	"Til the Money Runs Out"	4:31
8.	"Bam City"	3:25
9.	"Funk (I Got This)"	4:41
10.	"Lucy Mongoosey"	3:21
11.	"I Feel So Free (Citation Needed)"	8:39
Total length:		51:25

Japanese bonus track
No.	Title	Length
12.	"Butt Dial/Bitter Lemon"	3:24
Total length:		54:49

== Personnel ==
- Rafael Cohen – vocals, bass, guitars, keyboards
- Nic Offer – vocals, keyboards
- Mario Andreoni – guitar, bass, keyboards
- Allan Wilson – saxophone, keyboards, percussion, background vocals
- Daniel Gorman – keyboards, background vocals
- Paul Quattrone – drums
- Heba Kadry – mastering

== Charts ==
Chart performance for As If
Chart (2015)	Peak position
Belgian Albums (Ultratop Flanders)	142
Japanese Albums (Oricon)	80
US Top Dance Albums (Billboard)	18
