= Vidago, Arcossó, Selhariz e Vilarinho das Paranheiras =

- Civil parish
- Location in Portugal
- Coordinates: 41.65°N 7.57°W
- Country: Portugal
- Region: Norte
- Intermunic. comm.: Alto Tâmega
- District: Vila Real
- Municipality: Chaves

Area
  - Total: 24.57 km^{2} (9.49 sq mi)

Population (2011)
  - Total: 1,991
  - Density: 81/km^{2} (210/sq mi)
- Time zone: UTC+00:00 (WET)
  - Summer (DST): UTC+01:00 (WEST)

Vidago, Arcossó, Selhariz e Vilarinho das Paranheiras is a civil parish in the municipality of Chaves, Portugal. It was formed in 2013 by the merger of the former parishes Vidago, Arcossó, Selhariz and Vilarinho das Paranheiras. The population in 2011 was 1,991, in an area of 24.57 km^{2}.

== Architecture ==
=== Civic ===
- Agrarian School of Alves Teixeira (Portuguese: Escola Agrária Móvel Alves Teixeira/Escola Agrícola de Vidago/Centro de Formação Técnico Profissional Agrária Alves Teixeira)
- Hotel Palace of Vidago (Portuguese: Hotel Palace em Vidago)
- Manorhouse of the Machados (Portuguese: Solar dos Machados)
- Primary School of Selhariz (Portuguese: Escola Primária de Selhariz)
- Primary School of Vilarinho de Paranheiros (Portuguese: Escola Primária de Vilarinho de Paranheiros)
- Railway Station of Vidago (Portuguese: Estação Ferroviária do Vidago)
- Spring of Olmo (Portuguese: Fonte do Largo do Olmo)

=== Religious ===
- Chapel of Santo António (Portuguese: Capela de Santo António)
- Chapel of São Simão (Portuguese: Capela do Olmo/Capela de São Simão)
- Church of Nossa Senhora da Conceição (Portuguese: Igreja Paroquial de Vidago/Igreja de Nossa Senhora da Conceição)
- Church of São Francisco (Portuguese: Igreja Paroquial de Vilarinho de Paranheiras/Igreja de São Francisco)
- Church of São Tomé (Portuguese: Igreja Paroquial de Arcossó/Igreja de São Tomé)
- Cross of Vidago (Portuguese: Cruzeiro Alpendrado em Vidago)
- Sanctuary of Alto do Côto (Portuguese: Capela do Côto/Capela de Nossa Senhora da Saúde/Santuário do Alto do Côto)
