= Out Hud =

American electronic band

- Origin: Sacramento, California, U.S.
- Genres: Electronic; experimental rock; funk; dance
- Years active: 1996–2005
- Label: Kranky
- Spinoff of: !!!
- Members: Nic Offer; Tyler Pope; Justin Van Der Volgen; Molly Schnick; Phyllis Forbes
- Website: Official Site @ Brainwashed.com

Out Hud was an American electronic band formed in 1996 in the Bay Area of California and later based in New York City. The band consisted of guitarist Nic Offer, bassist Tyler Pope, cellist Molly Schnick, vocalist/drummer Phyllis Forbes and mixer Justin Van Der Volgen. Pope, Offer, and Van Der Volgen are also members of the similar band !!!. Their first album, S.T.R.E.E.T. D.A.D., was instrumental. For their second album, Let Us Never Speak Of It Again, the group added vocals to their music, with Forbes singing lead while a drum machine filled in her usual role, assisted with Schnick on backing vocals.

Shortly after the release of their second album, it was announced that Pope would not be joining the band on tour, and instead would be concentrating on James Murphy's dance-punk band LCD Soundsystem. It was then announced in September 2005 that a concert in New York might be their last show.

Molly Schnick is now working as a solo artist known as Jean on Jean. She released her self-titled debut album in 2008 on Kanine Records.

The song "How Long" was featured in the movie I Know Who Killed Me starring Lindsay Lohan.

== Name ==
The band has suggested that they do not know what the band name means, although this may be said humorously. It may be a distortion, and past or past participle form of, the verb "outhear," which means, according to Wiktionary, "to hear more acutely than."

== Discography ==
=== Albums ===
- S.T.R.E.E.T. D.A.D. (Kranky, 2002, CD/LP)
- Let Us Never Speak of It Again (Kranky, 2005, CD/LP)

=== EPs and singles ===
- "Guilty Party" (Red Alert Works, 1997 7")
- "Natural Selection" (Gold Standard Labs, 1997, 7")
- "First Song We Ever Wrote" (Dead Turtle Records 1999)
- GSL26/LAB SERIES VOL. 2 EP split with !!! (Gold Standard Labs, 1999, 12")
- "The First Single of the New Millennium" (5RC, 2000, 7")
- "One Life to Leave" (Kranky, 2005, 12"/CD)
- "It's for You" (Kranky, 2005, 12"/CD)
