= Super Bock Super Rock =

Music festival in Portugal

Coordinates: 38.5139539°N 9.14594650°W

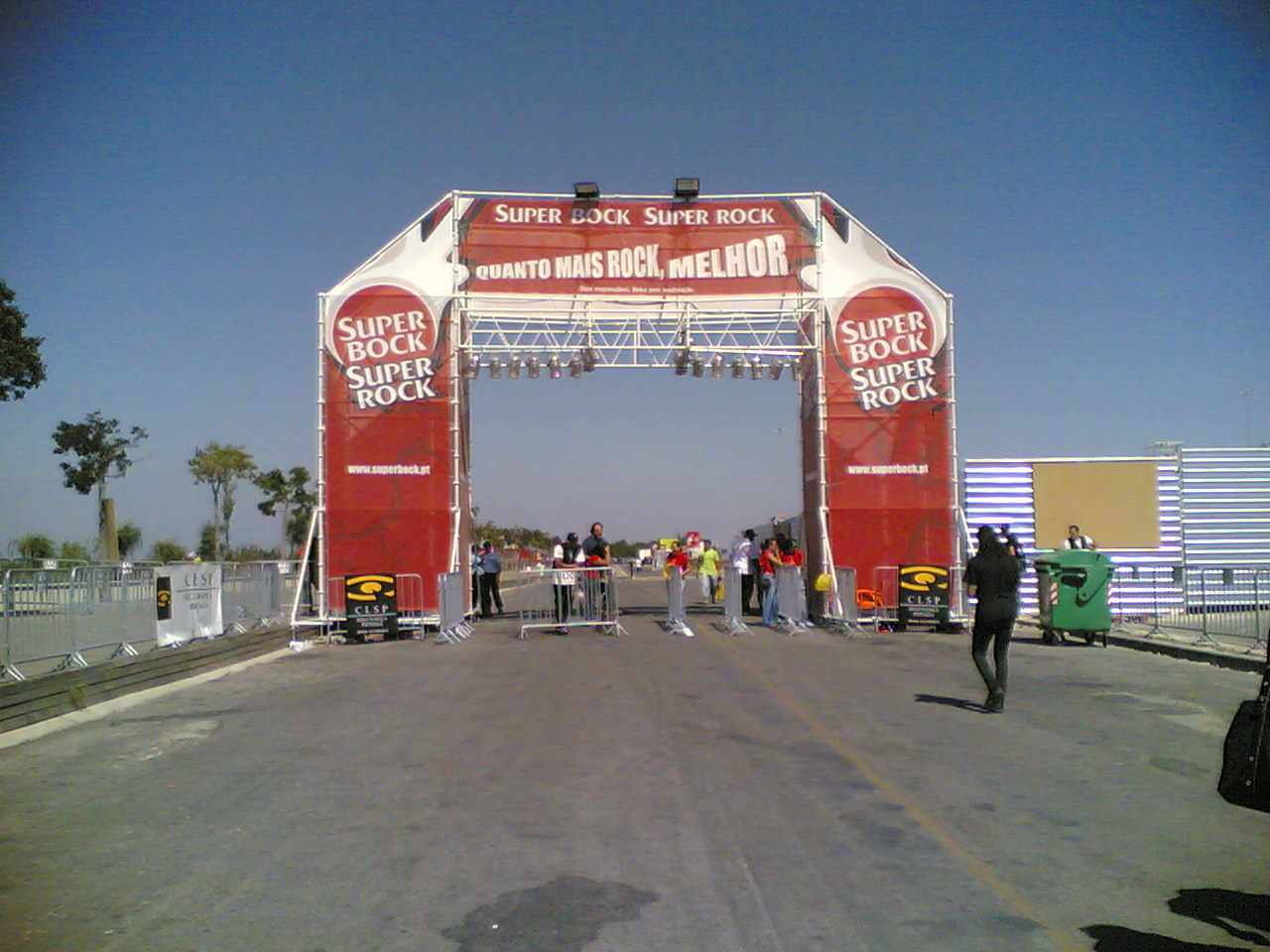
- Entrance of the 12th edition of Super Bock Super Rock in 2006
- Genre: Rock, alternative rock, heavy metal, electronic, hip hop, pop
- Dates: July (since 2008)
- Locations: Various; currently held at Herdade do Cabeço da Flauta, Sesimbra, Portugal
- Years active: 1995–present

Super Bock Super Rock is a music festival in Portugal that takes place annually since 1995. It is organized by the Portuguese live entertainment company Música no Coração and is named after its main sponsor, the beer brand Super Bock.

Over the years, the festival has had various formats, locations and focus on music genres. It is currently held during a weekend in July at the Herdade do Cabeço da Flauta, close to the Meco beach, in Sesimbra.

== History ==
Super Bock Super Rock started as a two-day festival in July 1995, held at the Gare Marítima de Alcântara in Lisbon. The next two editions were held at the Passeio Marítimo de Algés. In 1998 it was held during the Expo '98 fair in Lisbon, at the Praça Sony.

In 1999, in its fifth edition, the format of the festival was changed: it became a 10-day event in 3 different cities, in closed venues. The concerts were held at the Coliseu dos Recreios, Aula Magna and Paradise Garage in Lisbon, the Coliseu do Porto in Porto and the Hard Club in Vila Nova de Gaia. This festival format and locations were kept for the following two editions. In 2000, it was held between 3 and 15 March. In 2001, the festival went on for 30 days.

In 2002, Super Bock Super Rock expanded its locations to Spain. The eighth edition was held in Lisbon, Porto, Vila Nova de Gaia, Coimbra and Vigo (Spain). The ninth edition, in 2003, expanded the numbers of locations even further by including concerts in Évora and Madrid (Spain). One of the highlights of this edition were the sold-out concerts by Coldplay in Lisbon and Madrid. Marilyn Manson, Deftones, Audioslave and Primitive Reason performed in Lisbon.

In 2004, Super Bock Super Rock returned to the open-air festival format, held at the Parque Tejo, in Lisbon. It continued to be organized in Parque Tejo until 2008.

In 2008 the festival was split between a location in Lisbon, Parque Tejo, and another in Porto, the Estádio do Bessa. The format was repeated in 2009, with Estádio do Restelo being the chosen location in Lisbon.

In 2010, Super Bock Super Rock moved for the first time to a non-urban location, settling at the Herdade do Cabeço da Flauta, near the Meco Beach, in Sesimbra – about 25 km to the south of Lisbon. It provided a camping area. It remained in this location for 5 editions.

In 2015, the festival returned to the urban environment in Lisbon, being held in Parque das Nações. The main stage was at the MEO Arena. It remained in this location for 4 editions.

Since 2019 Super Rock Super Rock is once again organized at the Herdade do Cabeço da Flauta.

The 26th edition of Super Bock Super Rock was scheduled to take place on 16, 17 and 18 July 2020, at the Herdade do Cabeço da Flauta. On 15 May 2020, Música no Coração announced that the 26th edition would be postponed to 2021 due to the Portuguese government's decision to prohibit all large-scale events in the country until 30 September 2020, amid the COVID-19 pandemic.

The 26th edition was then planned to take place between 15 and 17 July 2021, in the same location, with all tickets bought for the 2020 edition still valid for the new dates. On 31 May 2021, Música do Coração once again announced the postponement of the festival, justifying the decision with the disruption in international travel still in effect due to the COVID-19 pandemic, which forced many of the scheduled international artists to postpone their tours to 2022.

== Editions ==
Edition	Year	Dates	Location(s)	Headliners	Notable acts
1	1995	8–9 July	Gare Marítima de Alcântara, Lisbon	The Jesus and Mary Chain, The Cure	Faith No More, Morphine, Therapy?, The Young Gods, Youssou N'Dour
2	1996	21–23 July	Passeio Marítimo de Algés, Algés	Spooky, The Prodigy, David Bowie	The Divine Comedy, Massive Attack, Moonspell, Neneh Cherry, Xutos & Pontapés
3	1997	4–5 July	Passeio Marítimo de Algés, Algés	Simple Minds, Apocalyptica	311, Echo and the Bunnymen, Rage Against the Machine, RAMP, Skank
4	1998	31 July – 1 August	Praça Sony, Lisbon	Morphine, Van Morrison	Fastball, Mikel Erentxun, Spiritualized
5	1999	26 June – 6 July	Lisbon: Aula Magna, Coliseu dos Recreios, Estádio José Alvalade, Paradise Garage; Porto: Coliseu do Porto; Vila Nova de Gaia: Hard Club; Coimbra (2002–2003): Pavilhão OAF, Pavilhão Gil Vicente; Vigo, Spain (2002); Évora (2003); Madrid, Spain (2003): La Riviera, Palacio Vistalegre	Tricky, Skunk Anansie, UB40	Garbage
6	2000	3–15 March	Lisbon: Aula Magna, Coliseu dos Recreios, Estádio José Alvalade, Paradise Garage; Porto: Coliseu do Porto; Vila Nova de Gaia: Hard Club; Coimbra (2002–2003): Pavilhão OAF, Pavilhão Gil Vicente; Vigo, Spain (2002); Évora (2003); Madrid, Spain (2003): La Riviera, Palacio Vistalegre	Ben Harper, Bush, Beck	Guano Apes, GusGus, Da Weasel
7	2001	26 February – 25 March	Lisbon: Aula Magna, Coliseu dos Recreios, Estádio José Alvalade, Paradise Garage; Porto: Coliseu do Porto; Vila Nova de Gaia: Hard Club; Coimbra (2002–2003): Pavilhão OAF, Pavilhão Gil Vicente; Vigo, Spain (2002); Évora (2003); Madrid, Spain (2003): La Riviera, Palacio Vistalegre	Deftones, The Sisters of Mercy, The Young Gods, Placebo	PJ Harvey
8	2002	4–21 March	Lisbon: Aula Magna, Coliseu dos Recreios, Estádio José Alvalade, Paradise Garage; Porto: Coliseu do Porto; Vila Nova de Gaia: Hard Club; Coimbra (2002–2003): Pavilhão OAF, Pavilhão Gil Vicente; Vigo, Spain (2002); Évora (2003); Madrid, Spain (2003): La Riviera, Palacio Vistalegre	System of a Down, Scorpions, Da Weasel	Lamb, Muse, Orishas, Tomahawk, Weezer
9	2003	27 March–10 April, 29 May	Lisbon: Aula Magna, Coliseu dos Recreios, Estádio José Alvalade, Paradise Garage; Porto: Coliseu do Porto; Vila Nova de Gaia: Hard Club; Coimbra (2002–2003): Pavilhão OAF, Pavilhão Gil Vicente; Vigo, Spain (2002); Évora (2003); Madrid, Spain (2003): La Riviera, Palacio Vistalegre	Charlie Brown Jr., Madrugada, De La Soul, Xutos & Pontapés, Coldplay, Marilyn Manson	Audioslave, Deftones, Disturbed
10	2004	9–11 June	Parque Tejo, Lisbon	Linkin Park, N.E.R.D., Fatboy Slim	Avril Lavigne, Korn, Lenny Kravitz, Massive Attack, Muse, Nelly Furtado, Pixies
11	2005	27–29 May	Parque Tejo, Lisbon	System of a Down, Moby, Marilyn Manson	Audioslave, The Black Eyes Peas, Iggy & The Stooges, Incubus, New Order, The Prodigy, RAMP, Slayer
12	2006	25–26 May, 7–8 June	Parque Tejo, Lisbon	Korn, Tool, Franz Ferdinand, 50 Cent	Alice in Chains, The Cult, Deftones, dEUS, Editors, Keane, Moonspell, Pharrell Williams, Placebo, RAMP, Soulfly, Within Temptation
13	2007	28 June, 3–5 July	Parque Tejo, Lisbon	Metallica, Arcade Fire, The Jesus and Mary Chain, Underworld	Bloc Party, The Gossip, Interpol, Joe Satriani, Klaxons, LCD Soundsystem, Mastodon, Maxïmo Park, Scissor Sisters, Stone Sour, TV on the Radio
14	2008	4–5 July (Porto), 9–10 July (Lisbon)	Porto: Estádio do Bessa; Lisbon: Parque Tejo	ZZ Top, Jamiroquai, Iron Maiden, Tiësto	Avenged Sevenfold, Beck, Digitalism, Duran Duran, Mika, Morcheeba, Slayer, Xutos & Pontapés
15	2009	5 July (Porto), 18 July (Lisbon)	Porto: Estádio do Bessa; Lisbon: Estádio do Restelo	Xutos & Pontapés (Note: Depeche Mode were the original headliners, but cancelled their performance.), The Killers	Brandi Carlile, Duffy, Mando Diao, Nouvelle Vague, Peter Bjorn and John, The Walkmen
16	2010	16–18 July	Herdade do Cabeço da Flauta, Sesimbra	Pet Shop Boys, Vampire Weekend, Prince	Beach House, Cut Copy, Empire of the Sun, Grizzly Bear, Hot Chip, John Butler Trio, Julian Casablancas, Keane, The National, Spoon, St. Vincent, The Temper Trap, Wild Beasts
17	2011	14–16 July	Herdade do Cabeço da Flauta, Sesimbra	Arctic Monkeys, Arcade Fire, The Strokes	Beirut, Brandon Flowers, Chromeo, Elbow, Lykke Li, Ian Brown, James Murphy, The Kooks, Nicolas Jaar, Portishead, Ricardo Villalobos, Rodrigo Leão & Cinema Ensemble, Tame Impala, The Vaccines, The Walkmen
18	2012	5–7 July	Herdade do Cabeço da Flauta, Sesimbra	Incubus, M.I.A., Peter Gabriel & The New Blood Orchestra	Alabama Shakes, Bat For Lashes, Bloc Party, Flying Lotus, Friendly Fires, Hot Chip, Lana Del Rey, The Rapture, Regina Spektor, The Shins, Skrillex
19	2013	18–20 July	Herdade do Cabeço da Flauta, Sesimbra	Arctic Monkeys, The Killers, Queens of the Stone Age	Ash, Azealia Banks, Black Rebel Motorcycle Club, Gary Clark Jr., Johnny Marr, Kaiser Chiefs, Miguel, Tomahawk, Toy, !!!
20	2014	16–19 July	Herdade do Cabeço da Flauta, Sesimbra	Massive Attack, Eddie Vedder, Kasabian	Cat Power, Dead Combo, Disclosure, Erlend Øye, The Kills, The Legendary Tigerman, Metronomy, Jake Bugg, Joe Satriani, Sleigh Bells, Tame Impala, Woodkid
21	2015	16–18 July	Parque das Nações, Lisbon	Sting, Blur, Florence and the Machine	Bombay Bicycle Club, Crystal Fighters, dEUS, Franz Ferdinand & Sparks, Jorge Palma & Sérgio Godinho, Milky Chance, Noel Gallagher's High Flying Birds, SBTRKT, The Vaccines
22	2016	14–16 July	Parque das Nações, Lisbon	The National, Massive Attack & Young Fathers, Kendrick Lamar	Bloc Party, De La Soul, Disclosure, DJ Shadow, Iggy Pop, Jamie xx, Kurt Vile, Mac DeMarco, Rhye, The Temper Trap
23	2017	13–15 July	Parque das Nações, Lisbon	Red Hot Chili Peppers, Future, Deftones	Fatboy Slim, Foster The People, Kevin Morby, James Vincent McMorrow, London Grammar, Pusha T, Seu Jorge
24	2018	19–21 July	Parque das Nações, Lisbon	The xx, Travis Scott, Julian Casablancas & The Voidz	Anderson .Paak & The Free Nationals, Benjamin Clementine, Justice, Parcels, Stormzy, Temples, The The, Tom Misch, The Vaccines
25	2019	18–20 July	Herdade do Cabeço da Flauta, Sesimbra	Lana Del Rey, Phoenix, Migos	The 1975, Cat Power, Christine and the Queens, Disclosure, Kaytranada, Janelle Monáe, Jungle, Metronomy
26	2022	14–16 July	Parque das Nações, Lisbon (Note: Originally planned to take place at the Herdade do Cabeço da Flauta, it was moved to the Parque das Nações two days prior to the start of the event, due to alerts of high risk of wildfires in the original site.)	A$ap Rocky, Foals, DaBaby	C. Tangana, Declan McKenna, Flume, GoldLink, Hot Chip, Jamie xx, Leon Bridges, Metronomy, Nathy Peluso, Woodkid
27	2023	13–15 July	Herdade do Cabeço da Flauta, Sesimbra	The Offspring, The 1975, Steve Lacy	Caroline Polachek, Charlotte de Witte, Father John Misty, Franz Ferdinand, Kaytranada, Nile Rodgers & Chic, Parov Stelar, Róisín Murphy, Wu-Tang Clan
28	2024	18–20 July	Herdade do Cabeço da Flauta, Sesimbra	Måneskin, Slow J, (Note: 21 Savage were the original headliners, but cancelled their performance.) Stormzy	Nina Kraviz, Tom Morello, Black Coffee, Papillon, Aminé, Mahalia, Fisher, Vulfpeck, Mind Da Gap

|}
