= Super Bock Group =

Portuguese brewing company

Super Bock Group, SGPS, SA
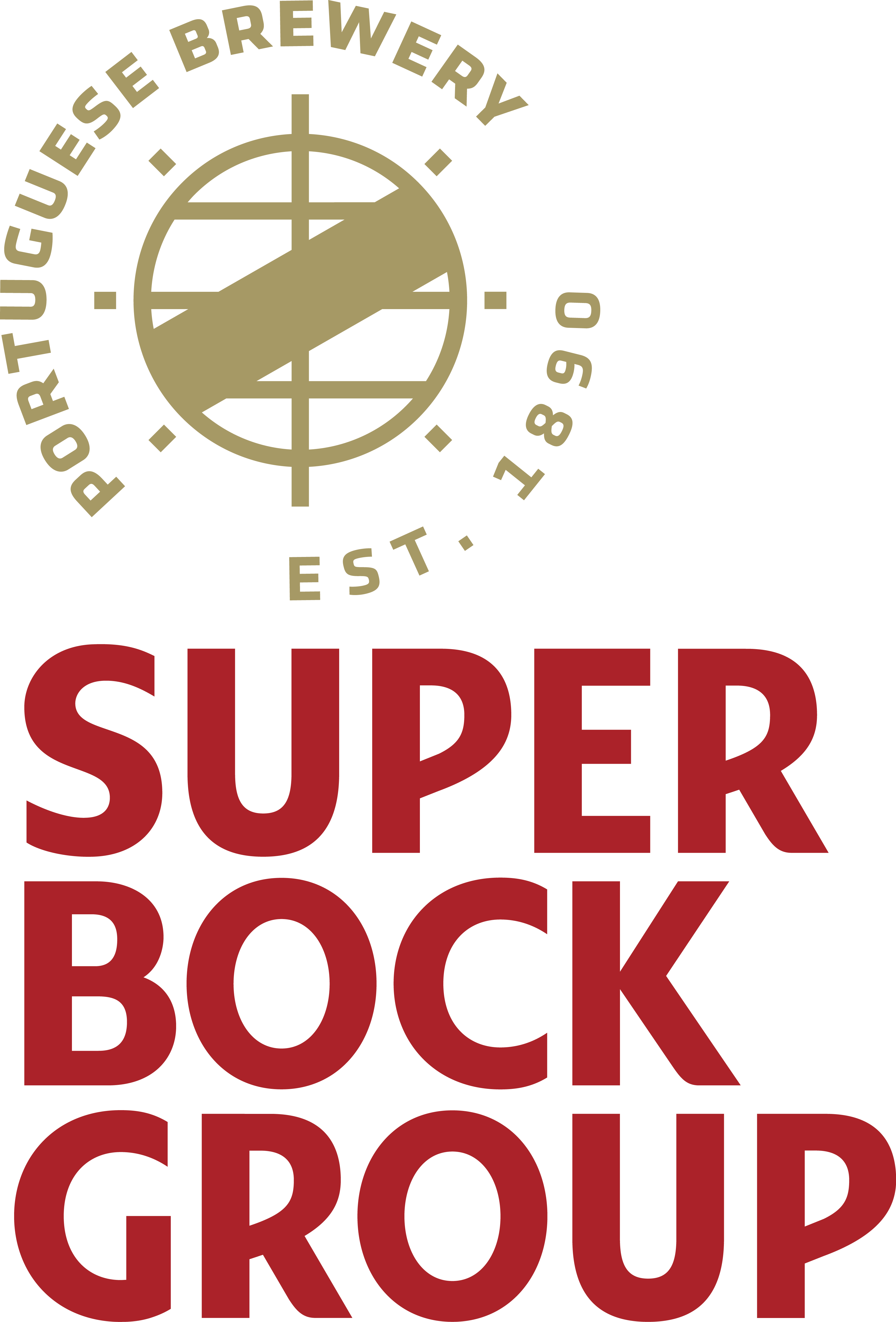
- Type: Privately held company
- Industry: Beverages, Tourism
- Founded: 1890
- Headquarters: Leça do Bailio (Matosinhos) Porto, Portugal
- Key people: Rui Lopes Ferreira (CEO); Manuel Violas (chairman of the board of directors)
- Products: Beers soft drinks waters wines ciders
- Revenue: ▲EUR 477 million (2014)
- Net income: ▲EUR 33 million (2014)
- Number of employees: 1,507 (2014)
- Website: www.superbockgroup.com

The Super Bock Group, SGPS, SA is a brewing company, headquartered in Leça do Bailio (Matosinhos), in the metropolitan area of Porto, Portugal. The company was founded in 1890 as the CUFP, being restructured and renamed Unicer in 1977. In November 2017, the name of the company was changed to the present one, reflecting its most famous output, the Super Bock beer. Its activity is set up on the business of beers and bottled water. It is the largest Portuguese beverage company and is also present in the areas of soft drinks, ciders and wines, in the production and sale of malt, and in the tourism business.

== Structure ==
The Super Bock Group is a company with decision center in Portugal, owned in 56% by Viacer (Carlsberg and Violas) and 44% by the Carlsberg Group. The Holding Viacer congregates two groups – Violas (71.5%) and Carlsberg Group (28.5%).

It is the largest Portuguese exporter of beer – an operation that has already reached more than 50 countries, mainly through Super Bock, which is the best-selling Portuguese beer in the world.

The company follows a multi-brand and multi-business strategy, focused on beer and bottled water but extends to the segments of soft drinks, cider and wine. Super Bock Group is also associated with the activity of malt production and sale and holds assets in the tourism sector, Vidago and Pedras Salgadas thermal parks, both in Trás-os-Montes region (North of Portugal).

== History ==
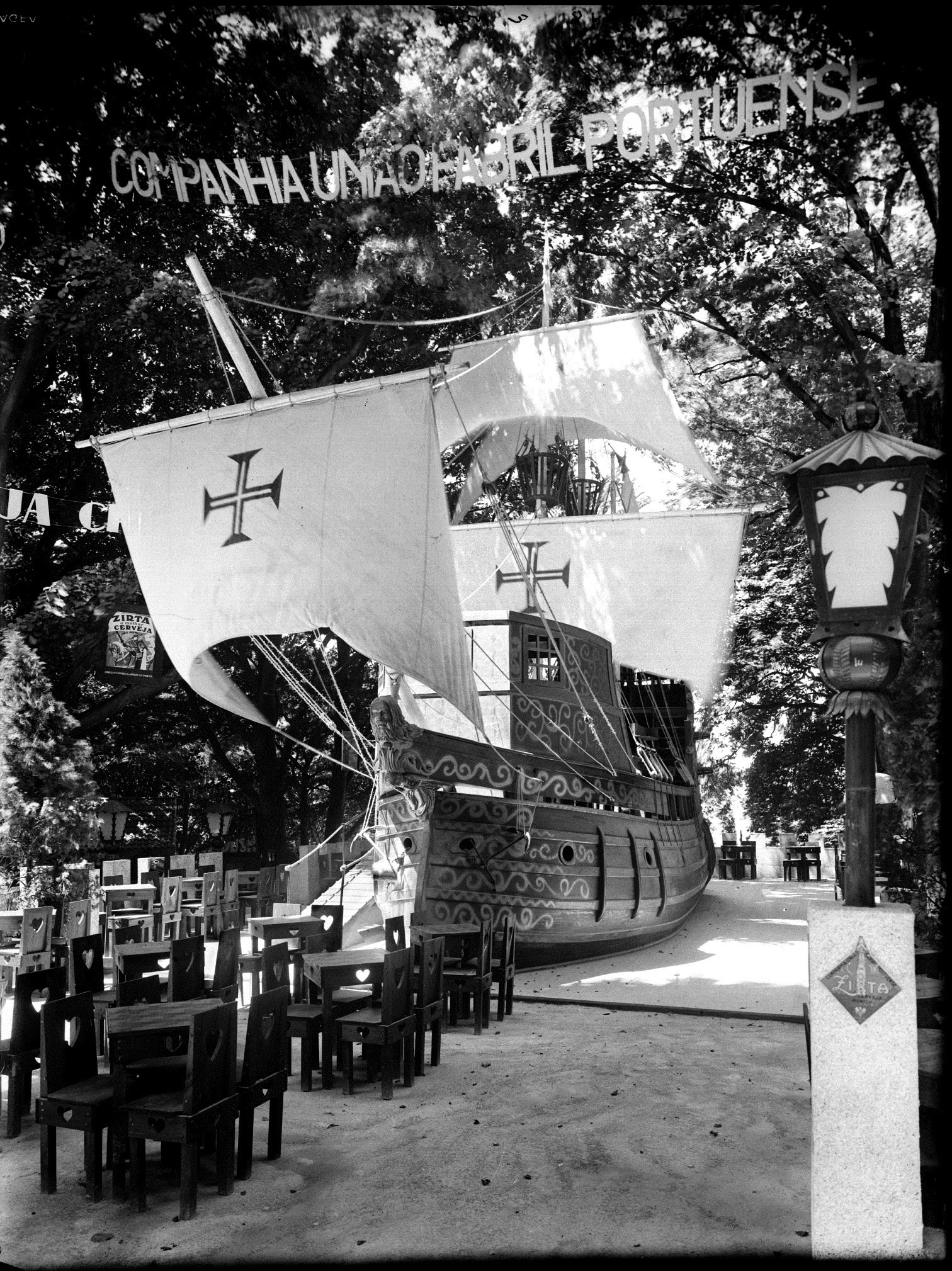
CUFP (Companhia União Fabril Portuense das Fábricas de Cerveja e Bebidas Refrigerantes) at 1934 Portuguese Colonial Exhibition.

=== Origins (1890–1950) ===
The origin of the company date back to the beginnings of the beverage sector industrialization, during the second half of the nineteenth century, when, on 7 March 1890, CUFP (Companhia União Fabril Portuense das Fábricas de Cerveja e Bebidas Refrigerantes) was formed. This conglomerate can be considered the mother of the current beverage company, with the initial capital of 125,000 escudos (former Portuguese currency), which is roughly €623. Of the seven factories that have joined this project, some were already several decades old.

=== Nationalisation and creation of Unicer (1975–1980) ===
In the Portuguese revolutionary period (that came after the Carnations Revolution), CUFP was nationalised on 30 August 1975. In December 1977, the State restructured the sector, combining the five nationalized companies into two, Centralcer, and Unicer – União Cervejeira (gathering CUFP, Imperial and Copeja).

In 1988, by the Decree-Law No. 353/88, Unicer was transformed into "Public Limited Liability Company with a majority public capital" with the designation Unicer – União Cervejeira, SA. Productivity has more than trebled between 1979 and 1989, and by the end of the decade, Unicer beer sales exceeded the 300 million liters. It was also during this period that Unicer started a consistent focus on exporting exceeding, in 1983, a million liters of beer exported, and over 4 million liters in 1988.

=== Re-privatization and growth (1989–1999) ===
Unicer's economic and financial indicators during the 1980s justified that it had been chosen by the government to begin the process of privatizations. Thus, on 26 April 1989, in a public session held in the Oporto Stock Exchange, the privatisation of 49% of capital took place. In 1990, the year the company celebrated its centenary, the privatization was completed, with the sale of the 51% stake that was still held by the State.

Over the 1990s, Unicer continued to invest in technological modernisation in all its sectors, in productivity expansion, in rationalization and expansion of the distribution network and in rejuvenation of brands and corporate image. After 1995, the beer market was growing again, and Unicer strengthened its leadership in the sector.

Super Bock expanded its popularity, participating in major events such as the most emblematic Portuguese summer festival Super Bock Super Rock, whose first edition took place in 1995; EXPO'98 or the campaign "Super Bock / Official Beer of the Year 2000" launched in 1999.

In 1992, Unicer started to produce and market the Danish brand Carlsberg in Portugal.

=== Restructuring (2000–2005) ===
In 2000, the core of Unicer shareholders, along with Viacer holding company, launches a public takeover bid, and gets to hold the totality of the capital, except for the shares of the company in itself.

By the end of 2000, it was formalized the change of name from Unicer – União Cervejeira, SA, to Unicer – Bebidas de Portugal, SA. A year later, the company changed its legal status, becoming a holding company and rearranging and empowering the various business units.

In 2000, Unicer entered the coffee sector, with the acquisition of the shares of the company A Caféeira, S.A., and strengthened its position in the wine sector, with the purchase of Quinta do Minho and Vimompor – Winery Society of Monção. In 2002, the purchase of VMPS – Vidago, Melgaço and Pedras Salgadas and their integration into Unicer, including six industrial facilities, natural parks and thermal and hotel units, and six water marks, projected the company for new challenges in the bottled water sector, as well as the entry in the Tourism sector.

=== New model of Governance (2006) ===
In June 2006, there is a change in Unicer governance, and the operational leadership started to be performed by the chief executive officer, a position entrusted to António Magalhães Pires de Lima.

Years later, concerning the beer business, a core business, there was a concentration of all of the production in Leça do Balio, where, in 2012, began the construction of a new factory with a capacity of 450 million liters, designed according to the foresight of the company's activity for the next twenty years. This emphasis on centralization and development of this production center represents an investment amounting to €100 million.

In July 2013, António Pires de Lima leaves the position of chairman of the Executive Committee of Unicer, to accept the office of Minister of Economy. He was replaced by João Abecasis.

=== 125 years Unicer (2015) ===
Unicer celebrated its 125th birthday on 7 March 2015, in a ceremony presided over by President of the Republic, Aníbal Cavaco Silva. The celebration coincided with the inauguration of the new industrial complex at Leça do Balio, part of the new warehouse, the headquarters building and the Beer Production Centre, in an investment of €100 million.

The Beer Production Centre stands out by combining new equipment, technologically superior, and a greater production capacity. The new warehouse is a fully automated infrastructure with an electric car circuit with direct connection to the factory and where you can store 40,000 pallets and move 12,000 pallets daily. Also the new headquarters, inaugurated in September 2014, includes an outer plate (System Thermal Insulation and Acoustic) which reduces about 30% of energy consumption.

Sustainability was a major concern in this work, and very positive indicators were achieved. In the new production plant and filling it was reduced by 23% the consumption of electricity; 12% water consumption; and 34% thermal energy consumption. But the new building is now in the process of obtaining LEED certification regulations that covers a set of design criteria, construction and operation of buildings in an environmentally sustainable manner.

Also to mark the 125th anniversary of the company, Unicer launched the book "Unicer, a long history", a work written by professor Gaspar Martins Pereira, journalist Júlio Magalhães wrote the foreword.

== Internationalisation ==
Currently, Unicer has commercial activity in more than 50 countries spread over five major markets: Angola, Rest of Africa, Europe, America, Pacific and Middle East.

Since the 2000s, Unicer has expanded substantially its exports. In 2006, it already exported about 117 million liters of beer and 23 million liters of water, accounting for about 18% of total sales (compared to 6% in 2000).

In 2012, Unicer exported more than 220 million liters of beverages, representing nearly 34% of its total turnover. On the beer market, the foreign market is even more important, exporting more than 40% of the total beer it produces.

The Angolan and European markets are the main contributors to the growth of Unicer, which holds a prominent position in the Portuguese beer exported leadership.

The main export market remains Angola, where Super Bock is at the top of the preferences among beer brands imported.

In Brazil, Água das Pedras secured, during the first year of internationalisation in this country (2013), its presence in 350 sales outlets, including restaurants, gourmet shops, hotels, bars and upscale retail. The leading brand of sparkling water in Portugal is also betting in the USA.

In August 2013, the first containers with half a million litres of Super Bock Non-Alcoholic 0.0% went to Saudi Arabia – thanks to a dealcoholisation process that does not include stopping the fermentation phase, and allows the conservation of the main features of a beer. After Saudi Arabia's experience, with Super Bock non-alcohol, Unicer wants to expand its presence in the Middle East.

Unicer's planning of international activity focuses on the development and implementation of infrastructure projects in different geographies, such as United States, Mozambique and several European countries.

== Brands ==
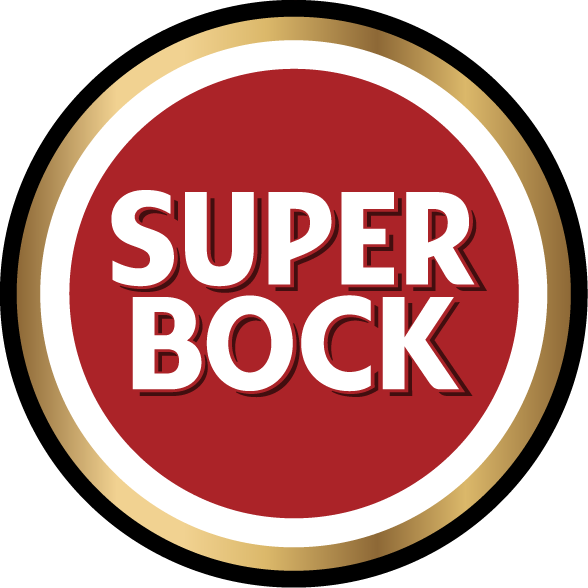

=== Beers ===
- Super Bock
- Cristal
- Cheers
- 1927
- Abadia

=== Soft Drinks ===
- Frisumo
- Frutis
- Snappy
- Guaraná Brasil
- Frutea

=== Waters ===
- Pedras Salgadas
- Vitalis
- Caramulo
- Vidago
- Melgaço

=== Wines ===
- Quinta do Minho
- Campo da Vinha
- Porta Nova
- Vinha das Garças
- Vinha de Mazouco
- Planura
- Monte Sacro
- Vini
- Vini Sangria

=== Ciders ===
- Somersby

== Production Centres ==
- Leça do Balio
- Pedras Salgadas
- Castelo de Vide
- Caramulo
- Envendos
- Melgaço
- Póvoa do Lanhoso
- Poceirão

== Tourism ==
The purchase of the entire share capital of the Group VMPS – Vidago, Melgaço and Pedras Salgadas in 2002, and their integration into Unicer – including nearly 500 workers, six industrial facilities, extensive natural parks and thermal and hotel units – allowed Unicer to enter the Tourism sector.

In 2005, Unicer launched the project Aquanattur (Industrial and Touristic Project of Pedras Salgadas and Vidago), with a major investment in upgrading these parks.

=== Pedras Salgadas Spa & Nature Park ===
Pedras Salgadas Spa & Nature Park is a tourist complex where the accommodation is made in 12 'eco-houses', small houses built of wood and slate, consisting of eight modules that were installed skirting nature, so that it would not kill any tree. This project was authored by the architect Luís Rebelo de Andrade. The old thermal spa houses the thermal spa, renewed by the famous Portuguese architect Siza Vieira.

In addition to the 12 houses of the initial project, the 'eco-houses' (which architecture has been awarded), the park also has two 'tree houses' – smaller houses, which rise between the trees creating the fantasy of true tree houses.

=== Vidago Palace Hotel ===
Vidago Palace Hotel recently opened with 70 rooms and suites, some with private patios, distributed between the four floors. The hotel, raised to the five-star category, reopened to the public in 2010 with a thermal spa and a renewed 18-hole golf course.

== Social Responsibility ==
In this area, Unicer is dedicated to 5 areas, taken as priority of the company: Ecological Footprint; Employees; Community; Business partners; and Consumer, through the promotion of responsible consumption and the promotion of Active and Social Lifestyle.

In these areas some projects stood out:

– In 2006, Unicer launched EnSave project, designed in collaboration with Danfoss Solutions, which has saved in Leça do Balio, 90 million liters of water, 3,600 MW of electricity and 26% of the carbon dioxide consumption.

– In 2007, Unicer was awarded the "Citizenship of Companies and Organisations" prize awarded by the AESE (Association for Corporate Higher Studies).

– In 2008, Unicer starts two projects to create awards to recognise talent and national and international innovation. The first was the "Product Innovation Award", in collaboration with COTEC to reward innovative products developed on Portuguese soil.

– Prémio Nacional de Indústrias Criativas (National Prize for Creative Industries), in collaboration with Serralves Foundation and with the support of a network of strategic partners in various industries, was launched in 2008. This award, now in its 7th edition already, became a door entry for the creation and generation of many businesses in the area of creativity and culture, and it won in 2012, the European Prize for Enterprise Promotion.

– In November 2009, Unicer signs the letters of commitment promoted by APAN and the FIPA – «Advertising directed to children» and «Reformulation and Nutrition Information to Consumers» – to promote healthier lifestyles and fight bad eating habits.

– Unicer has worked with universities, having been recognized by the Faculty of Engineering of University of Porto for the relevance of its collaboration on projects with this university, especially with the Chemical Engineering department, Biological Engineering and Industrial engineering and Management; and the School of Engineering, University of Minho (EEUM) for continued support to education projects and research of this school, in particular with the Department of Biological Engineering.

– 5 December 2013, more than one hundred employees went to the streets and engaged in a great action of volunteering with institutions, families and/or people in a situation of greater vulnerability and/or in need.

– CAIS Recycla, a social entrepreneurship project created by CAIS and Unicer, was awarded and recognised by the President of the Republic, Cavaco Silva, in 2013, for the work for the promotion of socio-professional training of people in poverty and social exclusion.

According to the latest data of the Directorate-General for Education Statistics and Science (DGEEC), released in February 2015, relating to undertakings with more spending on I&D activities in 2012 in Portugal:

- Unicer Group is at 2nd place in the list of companies/groups of chemical, pharmaceutical and agri-food with more intramural spending on I&D activity in 2012.
- Unicer Group rose to 5th place in the list of companies/groups with more intramural spending on I&D activity in 2012.

== Awards ==
=== Unicer ===
Unicer was distinguished by the excellence of its activation campaigns at sales outlets, in the international awards POPAI. All together, it received 9 awards, 4 gold, 3 silver and 2 bronze, being the national and international company most awarded in this edition.

In 2011, Unicer's Management Report 2010 was awarded in the category "Annual Reports" as part of design excellence, by the Red Dot Awards: Communication Design.

In late May 2015, the commemorative book of the 125 years of Unicer, "Unicer, a long history", won the Grand Prize of the Year and the Grand Prix in the category «Books» under the Papies'15 awards, which reward the best graphic communication internationally.

=== Brands ===
In 2002, the year that celebrated its 75th anniversary, Super Bock became the first Portuguese beer (and one of the first in Europe) to receive quality certification. In 2009, Água das Pedras enhances its place on the national scene by being the first Portuguese brand of water to receive the ITKY (Superior Taste Award). In the years 2011 and 2012, Água das Pedras was again awarded, this time with the Superior Taste Award, an award given by the International Taste & Quality Institute.

In 2012, Carlsberg and Super Bock beers, produced by Unicer, were distinguished by the Carlsberg Group, internationally, as the beers with higher quality.

In the 2014 edition of the international competition Monde Selection, brands Água das Pedras and Super Bock received, respectively, the great gold medal and the gold medal. Super Bock is the only brand in the market to win 36 gold medals, 32 consecutive, in the international competition Monde Selection da la Qualité.

=== Tourism ===
In 2012, Pedras Salgadas Spa & Nature Park, by the architect Luís Rebelo de Andrade, was the winner of the prize "Building of the Year 2012" by ArchDaily in the category «Hotels and Restaurants».

In 2014, the project Pedras Salgadas Spa & Nature Park was awarded as Best Resort in "Travel+Leisure Design Awards". The tourism complex Vidago Palace Hotel also won the "World Luxury Hotel Awards 2014".
