= Vidago =

- Civil parish
- Location in Portugal
- Coordinates: 41.65°N 7.57°W
- Country: Portugal
- Region: Norte
- Intermunic. comm.: Alto Tâmega
- District: Vila Real
- Municipality: Chaves

Area
  - Total: 6.4 km^{2} (2.5 sq mi)

Population
  - Total: 1,186
  - Density: 190/km^{2} (480/sq mi)
- Time zone: UTC+00:00 (WET)
  - Summer (DST): UTC+01:00 (WEST)

Vidago is a village and a former-civil parish in the municipality of Chaves, in the Portuguese district of Vila Real. Until its merger into the parish of Vidago, Arcossó, Selhariz e Vilarinho das Paranheiras, the civil parish administered an area of 6.40 square kilometres (2.47 sq mi) and included a population of 1186 inhabitants.

== Notable people ==
Pedro Gonçalves - footballer, currently plays for Primeira Liga club Sporting CP and the Portugal national football team

== History ==
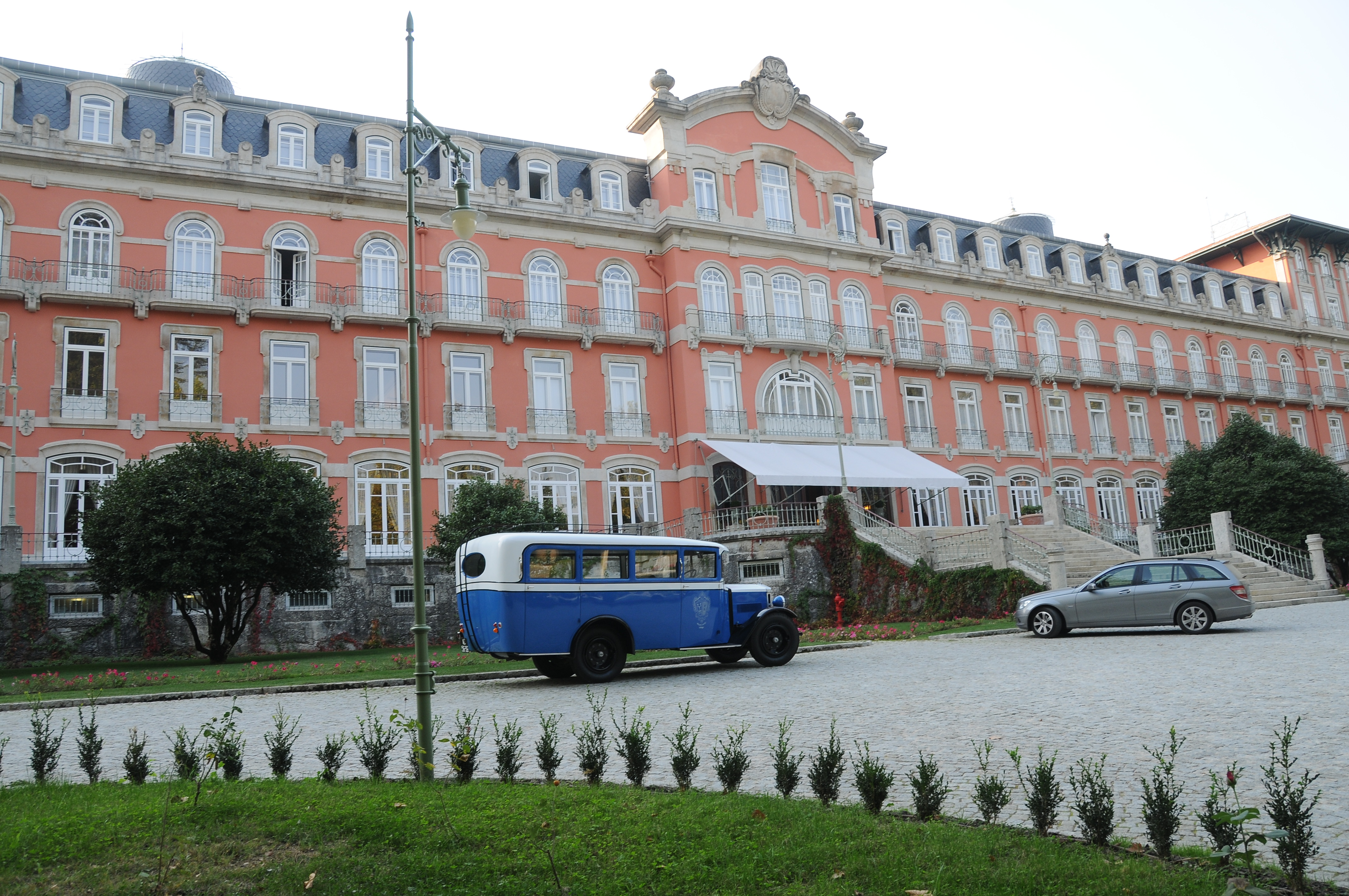
A view of Hotel Palace of Vidago

Known as a spa town, Vidago was a centre of mineral water treatments dating back to the late 19th century and early 20th century.

For a long time distance was an impediment to the development of the town, due to the difficulty of transport. Guests would arrive by coach from Porto, using roads that were often little more than dirt path. Finally in 1907 the railroad between Régua and Vila Real was extended to Pedras Salgadas, 12 kilometres (7.5 mi) to the south of Vidago. Three years later the first train arrived at the Vidago station, resulting in renewed popularity of the spa.

During the Gilded Age, the popularity of the waters in Vidago resulted in the construction of the Hotel Palace of Vidago, which became the retreat of some Portuguese monarchs. The spa town saw its period of splendor from 1875 to 1877 when King Luís I made consecutive visits. The fame of the curative powers of the waters spread so far that from 1876 to 1889 they were awarded prizes in Madrid, Paris, Vienna and Rio de Janeiro. For this, Vidago was once one of the most visited Portuguese spas; the water is apparently effective in the treatment of digestive problems, as it contains sodium bicarbonate and, according to publicity leaflets, radioactive elements.

Bottled mineral waters Salus and Campilho are extracted in Vidago.

When the Palace Hotel was built in 1910, it was one of the most luxurious on the Iberian Peninsula, that included concerts, tennis and croquet courts, and, on the small island within the lake, there was a spacious skating rink. Following a period of remodelling, refurbishing and renovation, the 5-star hotel reopened in 2010, which included an expanded golf course and park.
