= Vidago Palace Hotel =

Hotel Palace of Vidago
- Hotel-Palace de Vidago
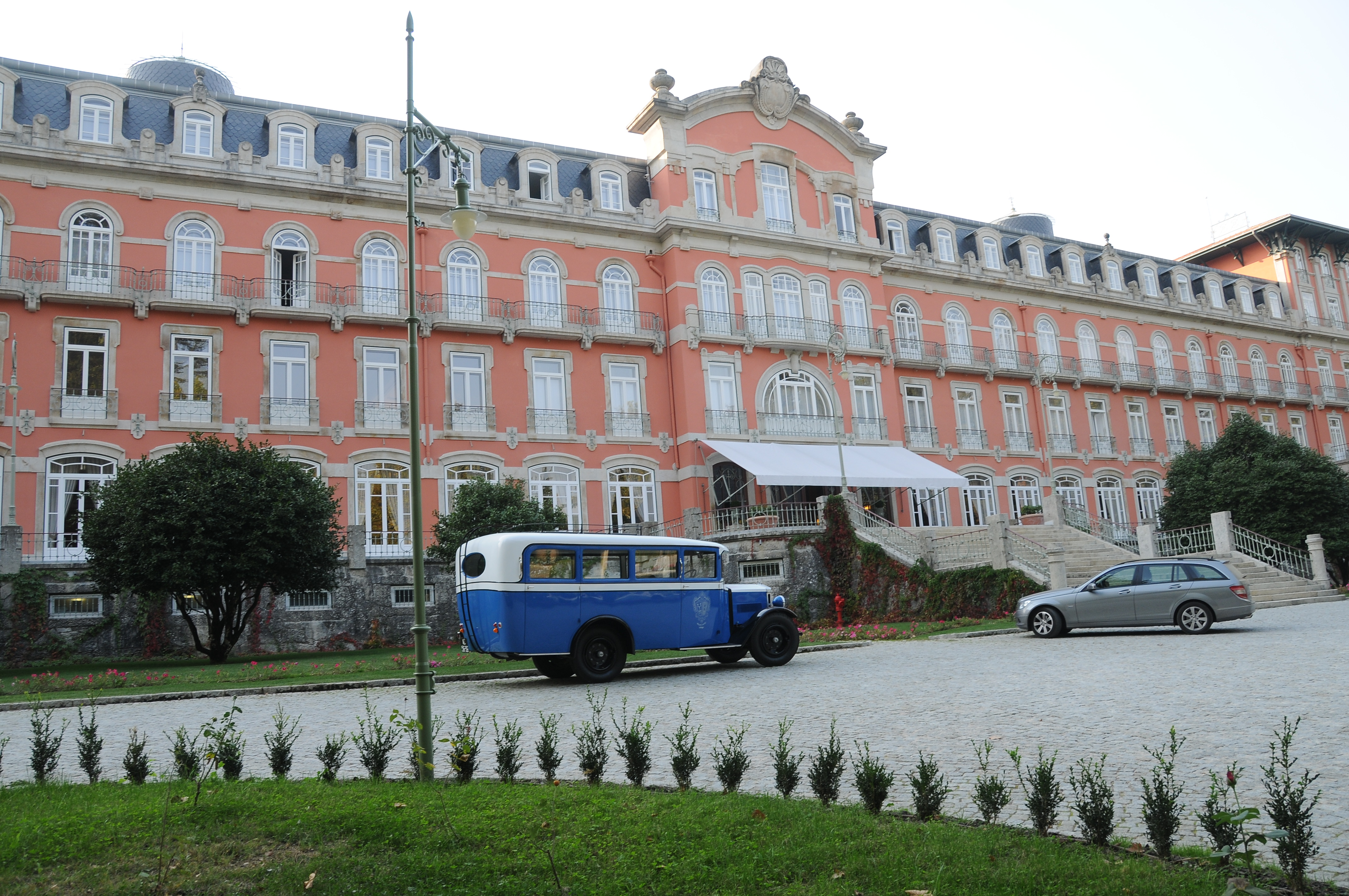
- The front facade of the hotel-palace in the former-civil parish of Vidago

General information
- Type: Hotel
- Location: Vidago, Arcossó, Selhariz e Vilarinho das Paranheiras, Chaves, Portugal
- Coordinates: 41.6329°N 7.5754°W
- Owner: Portuguese Republic

Design and construction
- Architects: José Cristiano de Paula Ferreira da Costa

The Hotel Palace of Vidago (Portuguese: Hotel Palace em Vidago), is a hotel located in the civil parish of Vidago, Arcossó, Selhariz e Vilarinho das Paranheiras, in the municipality of Chaves, Portuguese district of Vila Real.

== History ==
Profile of the Palace Hotel

The first hydrographic study of the thermal springs of Vidago occurred in 1863, following several years of visits by Portuguese locals and those seeking medical treatments. At the time there was a belief that the mix of sodium bicarbonates and "radioactive" elements were helpful in treating digestive problems. Since this period, though, the spas were closed, but at its height (1875 to 1877) was visited by people as important as the King D. Luís I of Portugal. Between 1876 and 1889 it was awarded prices in Madrid, Paris, Vienna and Rio de Janeiro for its curative properties.

The hotel was constructed in 1910, and was considered the most luxurious in the Iberian Peninsula at the time. Designed by architect José Ferreira da Costa, it was inaugurated by King D. Manuel II at the time of its opening; his brother and father (King Carlos) had visited Vidago for treatment, the centre becoming a centre of concerts, tennis and croquet events and on the island in the park there was a skating rink.

In 1995, there was a remodelling of the hotel.

Between 2007 and 2008, owing to degradation, Grupo Unicer (the owners) began a program of remodelling and recuperation, in order to create a tourist holiday village, under the direction of architect Álvaro Siza Vieira. It was reopened on 6 October 2010, coinciding with the centenary of the original hotel, assisted by then-Prime Minister José Sócrates. The reopening was headed by the Super Bock Group, who acquired the hotel and began restoration overseen by José Pedro Lopes Vieira and Diogo Rosa Lã.

In 2017, an historical television mini-series set in 1936 called Vidago Palace aired on RTP1. It was also filmed on location.

== Architecture ==
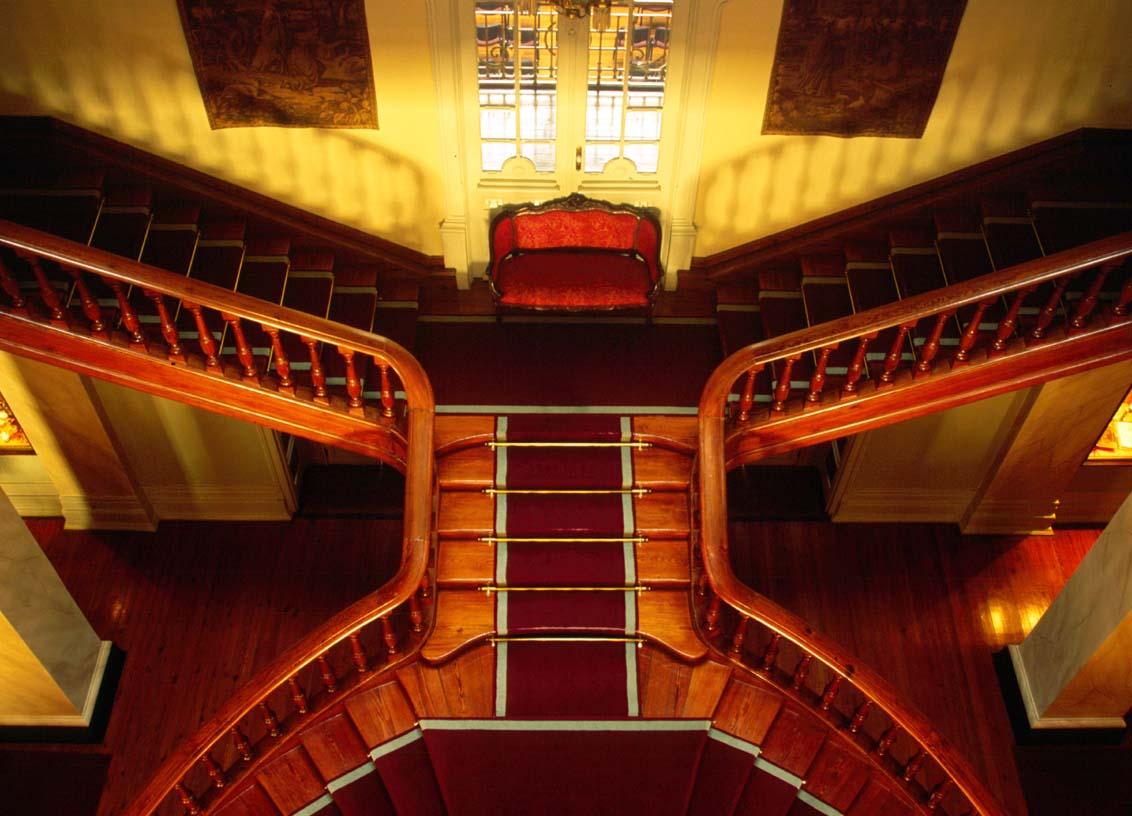
The grand staircase of the Vidago Hotel

The hotel is located in the millennium park of Vidago, encircled by various species of ancient trees (such as maples, pines and laurels), river runs, pedestrian trails and three natural mineral springs. These springs (called Vidago, Vidago II and Fonte Salus) have differing levels of bicarbonates, sodium and carbon mineral compositions.

The five-star hotel, that includes spa and golf resort, includes nine suites and 70 double rooms.

In 2010, the hotel was completely refurbished by the contractor Casais, hired by Aquanattur, Unicer's touristic project for Vidago and Pedras Salgadas. The lead designer was the renowned Portuguese architect Siza Vieira.

The original short 9 hole golf course was designed in 1936 by Mackenzie Ross, known for the Ailsa Course at Turnberry (ranked in the top 20 golf courses in the world). The golf course has been completely remodelled and extended by UK golf designers Cameron Powell, who converted the existing 9 holes course into six holes using existing tee and green positions and added 12 completely new holes. A golf academy, driving range and practice facilities were also added to the adjoining land. These changes allowed the resort to receive international competitions, that include the Bonallack Trophy, the Patsy Hankins Tournament and, in 2025, The Ladies European Tour Access Series Super Bock Ladies Open.

The spa was housed in an Art Nouveau pavilion on the grounds that was converted into conference room. It included a sunk 3 metres (9.8 ft) pool, stained-glass windows and marble decorated with a mixture of Neoclassical and Moorish styles.

The Salão Nobre (grand ballroom) now includes a fine-dining restaurant where local Michelin star chef Vitor Matos oversees the menu.
