= Shake the Shudder =

Studio album by !!!
- Released: May 19, 2017
- Genres: Dance-punk; funktronica; alternative dance
- Length: 49:25
- Label: Warp
- Producer: Patrick Ford

!!! chronology
As If (2015)	Shake the Shudder (2017)	Wallop (2019)

Singles from Shake the Shudder
- 1. "The One 2" Released: March 22, 2017; 2. "Dancing Is the Best Revenge" Released: May 3, 2017

Shake the Shudder is the seventh studio album by American dance-punk group !!!, released on May 19, 2017, on Warp Records. The band described the album as a "fancy way of saying 'shake it off and dance your cares away.'"

== Reception ==
Professional ratings
Aggregate scores
Source	Rating
Metacritic	65/100
Review scores
Source	Rating
AllMusic	4/5 stars
The A.V. Club	C+
Clash	3/10
Exclaim!	7/10
Pitchfork	7.3/10

Shake the Shudder received generally positive reviews. On Metacritic, the album has received a weighted average score of 64, indicating "generally favorable reviews", based on 12 reviews. Stuart Berman of Pitchfork said that !!! "[have not] lost their flair for infusing peak-hour hysterics with sobering morning-after rumination." However, in a far more critical review, Josh Gray of Clash described the album as "a terrible party bag: previous experience suggests that it should be full to the brim with party-poppers, balloons and dangerously sugary sweets but, in reality, all it contains is a few loose crayons and a small bar of vegan chocolate."

== Track listing ==
No.	Title	Length
1.	"The One 2"	4:26
2.	"DITBR (Interlude)"	0:48
3.	"Dancing Is the Best Revenge"	4:41
4.	"NRGQ"	4:30
5.	"Throw Yourself in the River"	3:55
6.	"What R U Up 2Day?"	4:27
7.	"Five Companies"	3:59
8.	"Throttle Service"	4:37
9.	"Imaginary Interviews"	4:47
10.	"Our Love (U Can Get)"	4:27
11.	"Things Get Hard"	3:29
12.	"R Rated Pictures"	5:19
Total length:		49:25

== Charts ==
Chart performance for Shake the Shudder
Chart (2017)	Peak position
Japanese Albums (Oricon)	153
