= Amanda Lovejoy Street =

American actress

Amanda Lovejoy Street is a filmmaker and Dream Work Teacher based in upstate New York and Los Angeles. Her work explores our relationship with the unconscious and what is unearthed when we allow the unconscious impulses and images to arise.

Her first short film, MAGIC BULLET (with Rosemarie DeWitt and Molly Parker) premiered at the Slamdance Film Festival in 2018. It went on to win Best Narrative Short at Indie Memphis, play at favorite festivals such as Maryland Film Festival and land a spot as a Vimeo Staff Pick. In 2019 she directed the Chk Chk Chk video for their song Ur Paranoid (Warp Records).

As a student of the legendary Sandra Seacat, Street was first exposed to the relationship between creativity and dreams. Street took that curiosity to Kim Gillingham (Creative Dream Work) with whom she apprenticed and now teaches alongside, working with actors, writers, directors, musicians and visual artists who are seeking to develop a relationship with the unconscious as an ever replenishing source of creativity and depth. She was an advisor for the 2022 New Zealand Script to Screen Story Camp Aotearoa.

== Early life ==
The daughter of actress Rebecca Street, Amanda was born in Washington D.C. and raised in Los Angeles. She attended the Evergreen State College in Olympia, Washington, with an emphasis in Photography and Literature. She also attended Royal Academy of Dramatic Arts through the Marymount London Drama Program in London, UK. While living in Olympia Washington, she was in the performance art band The Skirts which toured with the Cha Cha Cabaret and was on the K Record's album.

== Career ==
Street has been coaching and teaching Dream Work since 2017. She currently works under the umbrella of Feeling Tone. Her first short film, MAGIC BULLET (with Rosemarie DeWitt and Molly Parker) premiered at the Slamdance film festival in 2018. It went on to win Best Narrative Short at Indie Memphis, play at favorite festivals such as Maryland Film Festival and land a spot as a Vimeo Staff Pick. In 2019 she directed the Chk Chk Chk video for their song Ur Paranoid (Warp Records). Street starred in the feature films How to Cheat and Crutch. She received positive reviews for her performance in How to Cheat, being called a "beguiling newcomer" and "fascinatingly offbeat. She has appeared in numerous plays including Tommy Smith's Fugue, Absinthe, Opium and Magic: 1920s Shanghai, and Karl Gajdusek's Fubar.

== Filmography ==
- Crutch (2009) (as Amanda Street)
- How to Cheat (2011) (Louise, as Amanda Street)
- Sad Imitation (2015) (Sara)
- Magic Bullet (2018) (Director/Writer)
- Slamdance TV (2018) (Self)
- Chk Chk Chk: Ur Paranoid (2019) (Director)
- Sarah Mary Chadwick: When Will Death Come (2020) (The Partner)
