= Myth Takes =

Studio album by !!!
- Released: March 5, 2007
- Recorded: 2006
- Genre: Dance-punk
- Length: 48:20
- Label: Warp WARP154
- Producers: Justin Van Der Volgen; The Brothers

!!! chronology
Take Ecstasy with Me/Get Up (2005)	Myth Takes (2007)	Strange Weather, Isn't It? (2010)

Singles from Myth Takes
- 1. "Heart of Hearts" Released: 2007; 2. "Must Be the Moon" Released: 2007

Professional ratings
Aggregate scores
Source	Rating
Metacritic	76/100
Review scores
Source	Rating
AllMusic	4/5 stars
Alternative Press	4.5/5 stars
The A.V. Club	B+
Blender	3.5/5 stars
Entertainment Weekly	B
The Guardian	4/5 stars
Pitchfork	8.0/10
Rolling Stone	3/5 stars
Spin	3.5/5 stars
Uncut	4/5 stars

Myth Takes is the third album by !!!. The album was released on March 5, 2007. It was recorded in Nashville, Tennessee, United States, and features drummer Jerry Fuchs. Early limited edition copies of the CD version of the album came with a second disc containing three remixes.

The first single was "Heart of Hearts", which was released as a free download and a limited vinyl picture disc on February 19, 2007. A video has been made for "Must Be the Moon" by Ben Dickinson. "Must Be the Moon" was released as a single on May 14, 2007 (June 5, 2007 in North America). It is only available as a digital download and 12" vinyl.

The song "All My Heroes Are Weirdos" is available in the video games Tony Hawk's Proving Ground and FIFA 08. "Yadnus" would be heard in an episode of The Blacklist and in video game The Crew 2. In addition, the Still Going to the Roadhouse mix of "Yadnus" appears on the Radio Broker radio station in Grand Theft Auto IV. The album art was created by artist Kevin Hooyman, a friend of the band. The song "Must Be the Moon" was featured in a 2010 Cartoon Network bumper and a trailer for the eighth season of Rick and Morty.

A poster advertising this album is prominently featured on the wall of the basement office that forms the setting of the British sitcom The IT Crowd.

== Track listing ==
No.	Title	Length
1.	"Myth Takes"	2:24
2.	"All My Heroes Are Weirdos"	3:04
3.	"Must Be the Moon"	5:56
4.	"A New Name"	4:54
5.	"Heart of Hearts"	6:02
6.	"Sweet Life"	3:46
7.	"Yadnus"	5:13
8.	"Bend Over Beethoven"	8:06
9.	"Break in Case of Anything"	3:39
10.	"Infinifold"	5:11
Total length:		48:20

Bonus disc
No.	Title	Length
1.	"Myth Takes" (Acouth Take)	2:14
2.	"Bend Over Beethoven" (Original Nashville Jam)	4:03
3.	"Heart of Hearts" (The Brothers Mix)	5:43

== Personnel ==
Band members

- Mario Andreoni – guitars, bass guitar, some keyboard, some percussion
- Nic Offer – vocals, keyboards, some guitars
- Tyler Pope – guitars, bass guitar, synths, drum programming
- John Pugh – vocals, drums, some bass, some percussion
- Justin van der Volgen – bass
- Allan Wilson – horns, synth, percussion
- Gerhardt Fuchs – drums

Additional musicians

- Jonno Lee, David Weiss, Joseph Baldbridge, Dayvan Duronslet, John Blake – drum corps on "All My Heroes Are Weirdos"
- Shannon Funchess – vocals on "Heart of Hearts"
- Jared Samuel clavinet on "Heart of Hearts"
- Eric Emm – E bow on "Infinifold"
- Olivia Mori – vocals on "Infinifold"
- Phyllis Forbes, Molly Schnick, Madeline Davies – vocals on "Break in Case of Anything"
- Amy Cimini – viola on "Infinifold"
- Heather Sommerlad, Lori Told, Alex Powell, Adele Mori – strings on "Yadnus"

== Charts ==
Chart performance for Myth Takes
Chart (2007)	Peak position
Belgian Albums (Ultratop Flanders)	58
French Albums (SNEP)	134
Italian Albums (FIMI)	81
Japanese Albums (Oricon)	36
UK Albums (OCC)	135
US Billboard 200	195
US Top Dance Albums (Billboard)	3
