= Shannon Funchess =

American musician

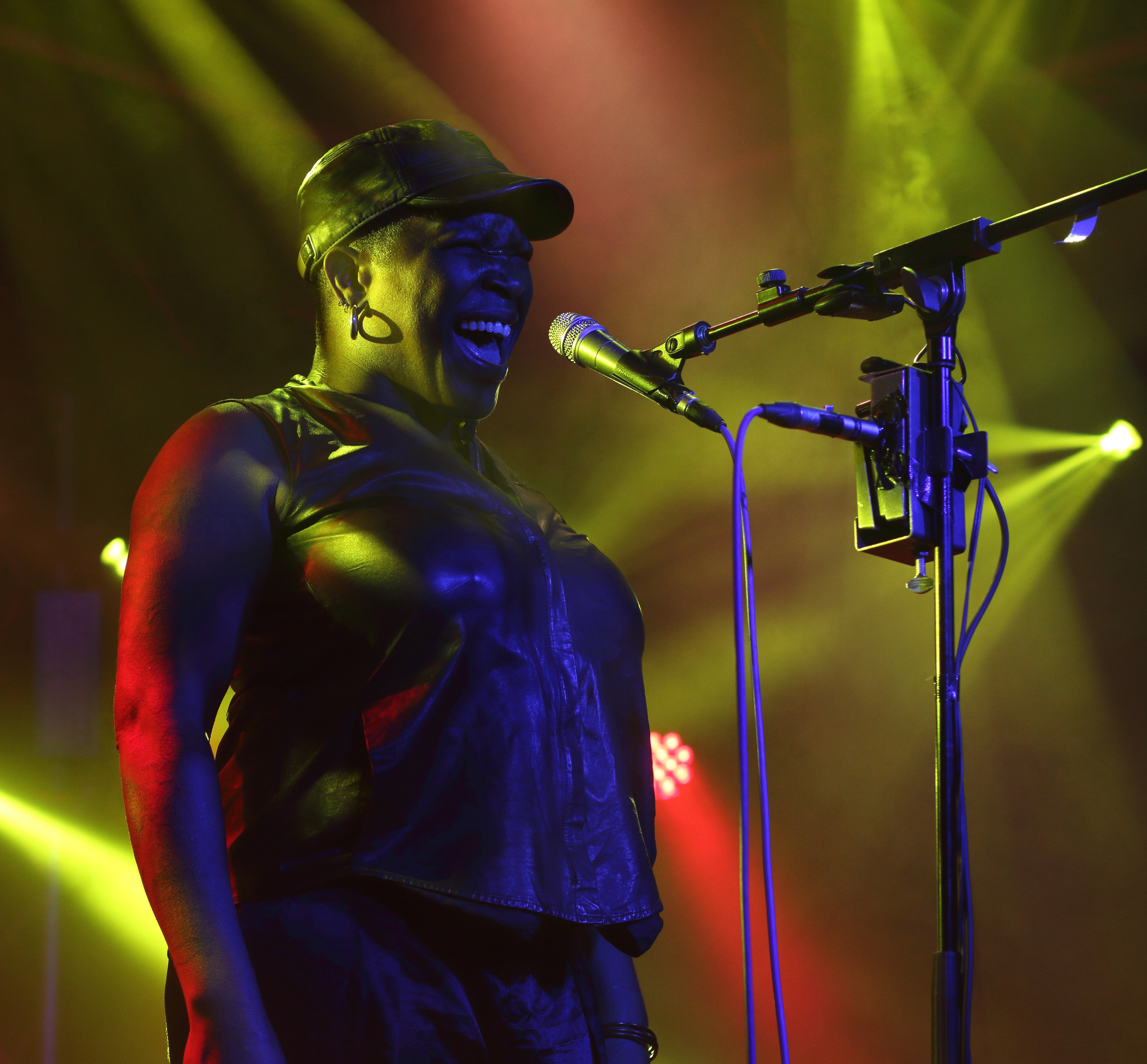
Funchess performing with Light Asylum in 2019.

Shannon Funchess is an American musician, producer, dancer, and performance artist. She is best known for her work as lead vocalist and composer for Brooklyn-based electronic music duo Light Asylum, which she founded in 2007 with musician Bruno Coviello. Funchess has recorded and toured with a number of electronic and alternative acts, including The Knife, Peaches, LCD Soundsystem, Clan of Xymox, and TV on the Radio. She has also served as a dancer and actor in various video productions and art performances, and as a DJ for Brooklyn radio station The Lot Radio.

== Career ==
Both prior to and after forming Light Asylum with collaborator Bruno Coviello, Funchess contributed vocal performances for a variety of music acts. She is featured on releases such as TV on the Radio's 2003 EP Young Liars, Myth Takes by !!!, and Shaking the Habitual by The Knife. Funchess is featured in the music video for "Snakes", a song created in collaboration with electronic duo Ford & Lopatin. In addition to recording with the band, Funchess served as lead vocalist of !!! during their 2007 tour.

Light Asylum released their first EP In Tension in 2010. The duo went on to release their self-titled full-length debut in 2012. Light Asylum's music is influenced by 1980s dark wave and synth-pop.

In 2018 Funchess performed in Michelle Handelman's Hustlers & Empires. Funchess and Handelman also collaborated on video project and live performance Doomscrolling, which premiered in 2021. Funchess collaborated with dancer and vocalist Justin F. Kennedy in creating A(un) Necessary World, a "sci-fi space opera" which was performed at the UCLA Hammer Museum in April 2022.
