= !!! =

American dance-punk band

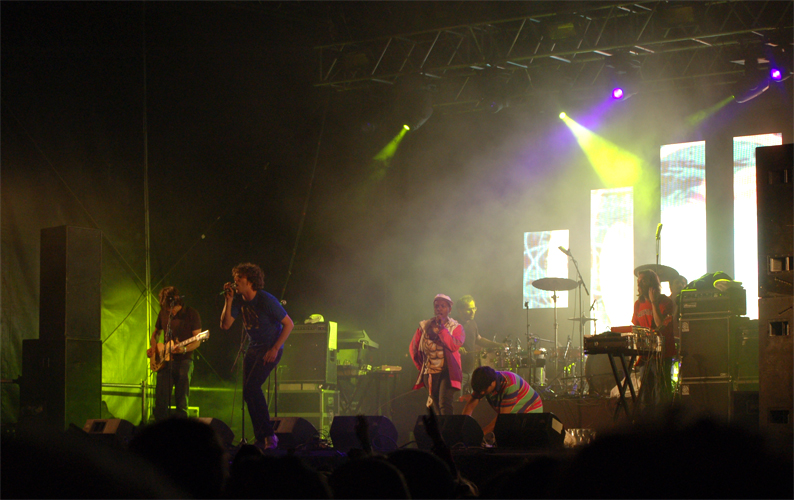
- !!! performing at the Flow Festival in 2007

Background information
- Also known as: Chk Chk Chk
- Origin: Sacramento, California, U.S.
- Genres: Dance-punk revival; alternative dance; funk rock; disco-rock; indietronica
- Years active: 1996–present
- Labels: Warp; Touch and Go; Gold Standard
- Spinoffs: Out Hud
- Spinoff of: Black Liquorice; Pope Smashers
- Members: Nic Offer; Mario Andreoni; Dan Gorman; Rafael Cohen; Meah Pace; Chris Egan; Paul Quattrone
- Past members: John Pugh; Mikel Gius; Allan Wilson; Tyler Pope; Jason Racine; Justin Van Der Volgen; Jerry Fuchs; Shannon Funchess
- Website: chkchkchk.net

!!! (/tʃ(ɪ)k tʃ(ɪ)k tʃ(ɪ)k/ CH(I)K CH(I)K CH(I)K), also known as Chk Chk Chk, is an American band from Sacramento, California. Formed in 1996 by lead singer Nic Offer, members of !!! came from other local bands such as the Yah Mos, Black Liquorice and Pope Smashers. !!! is composed of Mario Andreoni (guitar), Dan Gorman (horns/percussion/keys), Nic Offer (vocals), Rafael Cohen (bass/various electronic devices), Chris Egan (drums) and Meah Pace (vocals).

Vocalist and drummer John Pugh officially left the band in 2007 to concentrate on his new band Free Blood. Vocalist Shannon Funchess stood in for Pugh during much of their 2007 tour. The band also shared membership with the similar, defunct group Out Hud (including Tyler Pope, who has played with LCD Soundsystem and written music for Cake).

Following the release of Myth Takes in 2007, !!! continued to evolve their dance-punk sound with a series of albums, including Strange Weather, Isn't It? (2010), Thr!!!er (2013), As If (2015), Shake the Shudder (2017), Wallop (2019), and Let It Be Blue (2022). They are currently based in New York City.

== History ==
!!! was formed in the fall of 1996 by the merger of members of the groups Black Liquorice and Pope Smashers, while on tour. After a successful joint tour, the two bands decided to mix the disco-funk with more aggressive sounds and integrate the hardcore singer Nic Offer from the Yah Mos. Offer has cited Depeche Mode and OMD as influences.

The band's name was inspired by the subtitles of the movie The Gods Must Be Crazy, in which alveolar click consonants of the San people's Juǀʼhoan language were represented as "!". However, as the bandmembers themselves say, !!! is pronounced by repeating thrice any monosyllabic sound. "Chk Chk Chk" is the most common pronunciation.

The band's full-length debut record came out in 2000 as a self-titled album on the label Gold Standard Laboratories. This was followed in 2003 by the single "Me and Giuliani Down By the School Yard", a lengthy track combining house beats with sinewy basslines, psychedelic guitars, and simple lyrics which quote the title song of the musical Footloose.

A second full-length album, Louden Up Now, was released on Touch and Go in America and on Warp Records in Europe in June 2004. In June 2005, !!! released a new EP covering "Take Ecstasy with Me" by The Magnetic Fields, and "Get Up" by Nate Dogg. The following December, the original drummer for the band, Mikel Gius, was struck and killed by a car while riding his bike.

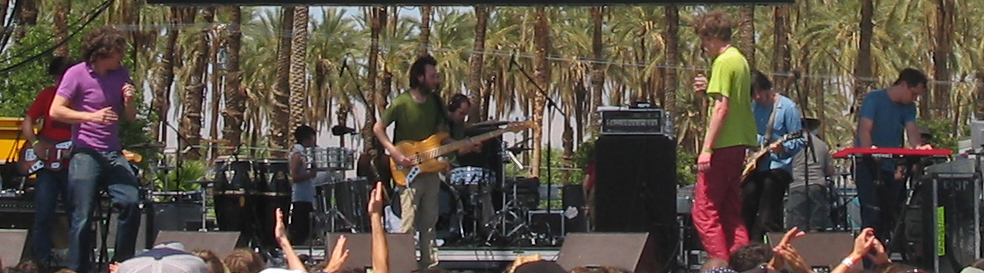
!!! performing at the Coachella Valley Music and Arts Festival in 2004

They released their third album, Myth Takes on March 4, 2007. Strange Weather, Isn't It? (their first for new label Warp) was the band's fourth album, released on August 22, 2010.

Their eighth full-length, Wallop, was released on August 26, 2019.

Following the release of Wallop, the band released the EP Certified Heavy Kats on July 30, 2020. The band's ninth studio album Let It Be Blue was released on May 6, 2022.

== Discography ==
=== Albums ===
List of albums, with selected chart positions
Title	Album details	Peak chart positions				
Title	Album details	US	US Elec.	FRA	JPN	UK
!!!	Released: 2000; Label: Gold Standard Laboratories	—	—	—	—	—
Louden Up Now	Released: June 7, 2004; Label: Touch and Go/Warp	—	4	169	—	135
Myth Takes	Released: March 5, 2007; Label: Warp	195	3	134	36	135
Strange Weather, Isn't It?	Released: August 24, 2010; Label: Warp	—	13	112	54	—
Thr!!!er	Label: Warp; Released: April 29, 2013	—	18	117	62	121
As If	Released: October 16, 2015; Label: Warp	—	18	—	80	—
Shake the Shudder	Released: May 19, 2017; Label: Warp	—	—	—	153	—
Wallop	Released: August 30, 2019; Label: Warp	—	—	—	166	—
Let It Be Blue	Released: May 6, 2022; Label: Warp	—	—	—	—	—
"—" denotes a recording that did not chart or was not released in that territory.

=== EPs ===
- Lab Series Vol. 2 [GSL26] (Split with Out Hud, 1999, Gold Standard Labs)
- Live! Live! Live! (November 20, 2004, Beat Records, Japan only)
- Yadnus (2007)
- Jamie, My Intentions Are Bass E.P. (November 2010)
- Daytrotter Session (May 29, 2013, Daytrotter Studio [Rock Island, IL])
- R!M!X!S (January 8, 2014, Japanese Import, WAP359D)
- MEGAM!!!X Vol.1: Shake Shake Shake (March 21, 2018)
- Certified Heavy Kats (July 31, 2020)

=== Singles ===
List of singles, with selected chart positions
Title	Year	Peak chart positions	Album
Title	Year	UK	Album
"The Dis-Ease/The Funky Branca"	1998	—	Non-album single
"Me and Giuliani Down by the School Yard (A True Story)"	2003	84	Louden Up Now
"Pardon My Freedom"	2004	—	Louden Up Now
"Hello? Is This Thing On?"	2004	74	Louden Up Now
"Me and Giuliani Down by the School Yard (A Remix)"	2004	—	Louden Up Now
"Take Ecstasy With Me/Get Up"	2005	213	Non-album single
"Heart of Hearts"	2007	—	Myth Takes
"Must Be the Moon"	2007	—	Myth Takes
"AM/FM"	2010	—	Strange Weather, Isn't It?
"Slyd"	2013	—	THR!!!ER
"One Girl / One Boy"	2013	—	THR!!!ER
"And Anyway It's Christmas"	2013	—	Non-album single
"All U Writers"	2015	—	As If
"Freedom '15" / "Sick Ass Moon"	2015	—	As If
"Bam City" / "Ooo"	2015	—	As If
"I Feel So Free" (Lost Souls of Saturn Remix)	2016	—	Non-album single
"The One 2"	2017	—	Shake the Shudder
"Dancing Is the Best Revenge"	2017	—	Shake the Shudder
"Serbia Drums"	2019	—	Wallop
"I'm Sick of This/So We Can F*ck"	2020	—	Non-album single
"Do the Dial Tone"	2020	—	Certified Heavy Kats
"Walk It Off"	2020	—	Certified Heavy Kats

=== Other projects ===
- !!! (1997, tour cassette)
