= Nic Offer =

American musician (born 1972)

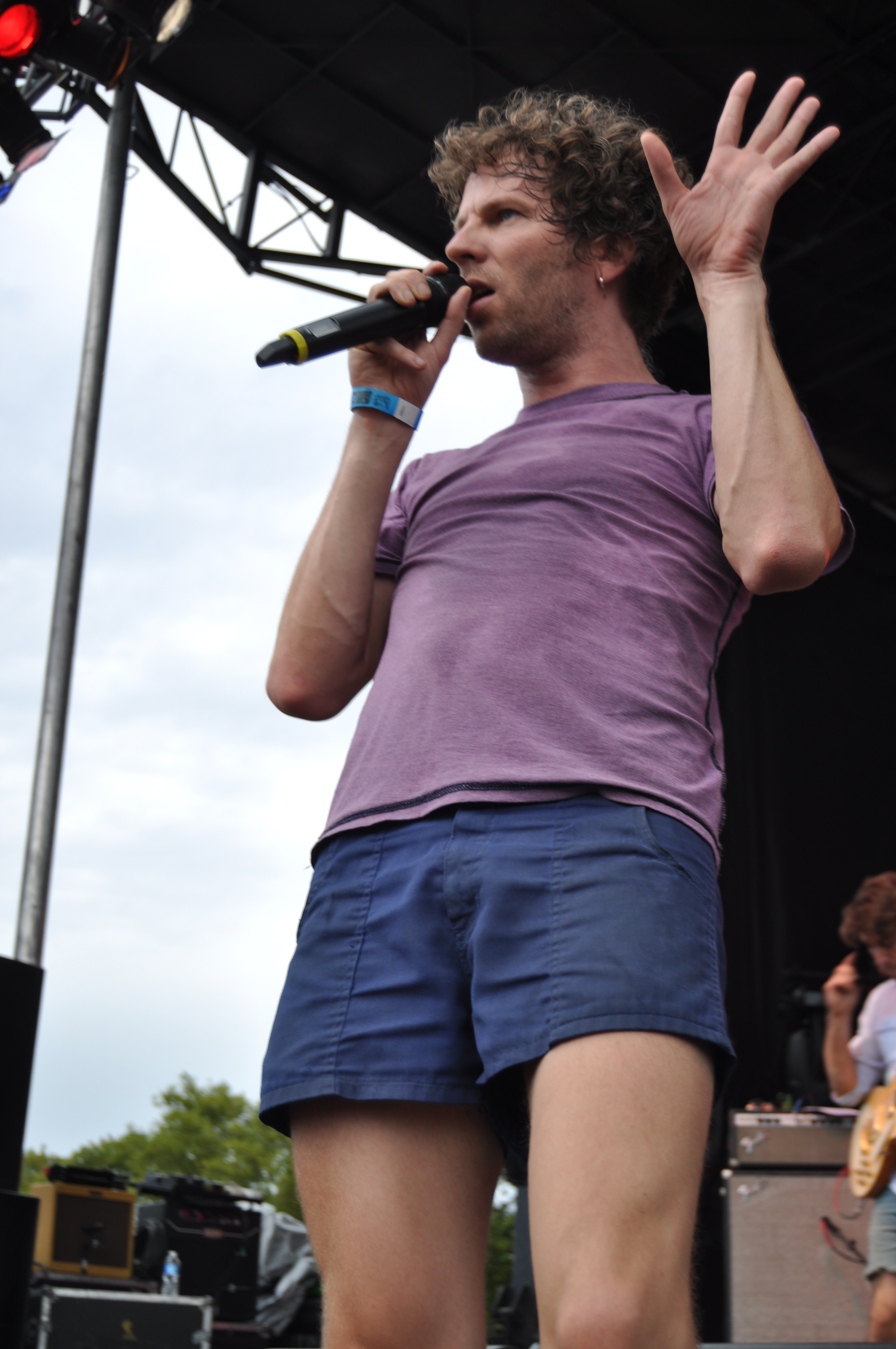
- Offer performing with !!! in 2011

Background information
- Born: Nicholas Joseph Offer; 1972 (age 53–54)
- Instruments: Vocals, guitar, bass guitar, keyboard
- Years active: 1996–present

Nicholas Joseph Offer (born 1972) is a New York City–based musician. He is best known as the vocalist of the dance-punk band !!!, which he helped form in Sacramento, California, in 1996. Offer played bass and keyboards for the electronic band Out Hud from 1996 until 2005.

Nic is noted for his energetic dancing while performing in a pair of blue shorts which have been described as "hot pants", "short shorts", "swim shorts" and "pool boy shorts".
