= LCD Soundsystem discography =

Band discography

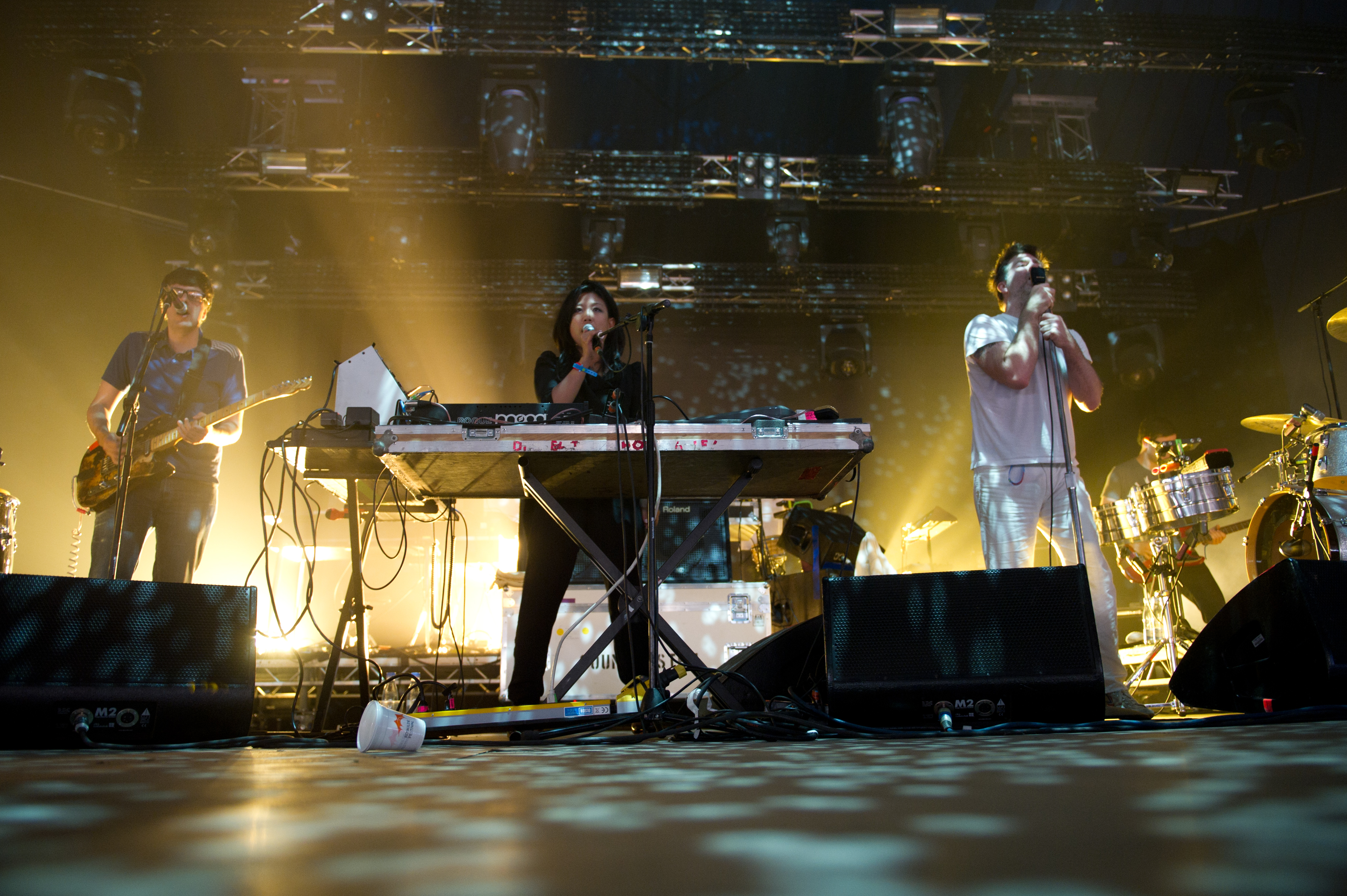
- LCD Soundsystem performing live at the Roskilde Festival
- Studio albums: 5
- Extended plays: 3
- Live albums: 3
- Compilation albums: 1
- Singles: 26
- Music videos: 17
- Remix albums: 2

American rock band LCD Soundsystem has released four studio albums, three extended plays (EP), one compilation album, two remix albums, three live albums, twenty-six singles, and fourteen music videos. The music of LCD Soundsystem is a mix of dance music and punk, and contains influences of disco. The band first gained attention when they released the single "Losing My Edge" on DFA Records, which became a well-known indie song in 2002. They then released more singles over the next few years and their self-titled debut album to critical acclaim. The album was certified gold in the UK but failed to chart on the US Billboard 200.

In 2006, the band released the 46-minute composition "45:33", "a conceptual jogging soundtrack" commissioned by Nike, as a one-track studio album exclusively through the iTunes Store. Frontman James Murphy stated that he wanted to make a long-form record in the style of E2-E4 by Manuel Göttsching rather than an actual workout track. LCD Soundsystem's third full-length album, Sound of Silver, was released to extremely positive reviews from critics and peaked at number 46 on the Billboard 200. Sound of Silver spawned three singles, including "All My Friends", which was named one of the best tracks of the 2000s by Pitchfork and Rolling Stone. In 2007 the album was nominated for a Grammy Award for Best Electronic/Dance Album, and the Shortlist Music Prize. Metacritic reported it to be the tenth best reviewed album of 2007.

LCD Soundsystem released their fourth studio album, This Is Happening in May 2010. The album was LCD Soundsystem's first to debut in the top ten of the Billboard 200, selling around 31,000 copies in its first week of sales. The band officially disbanded in 2011, after playing their last show at Madison Square Garden. They eventually reunited in late 2015, embarked on a world tour, and released their fifth studio album, American Dream, in September 2017. It went on to become the band's first number-one album in the United States.

== Albums ==
=== Studio albums ===
List of studio albums with selected chart positions and certifications
Title	Album details	Peak chart positions										Certifications (sales thresholds)
Title	Album details	US	AUS	BEL (Fla.)	CAN	FRA	IRE	NLD	NZ	SWE	UK	Certifications (sales thresholds)
LCD Soundsystem	Released: January 24, 2005; Label: DFA, Capitol, EMI; Format: CD, download, vinyl	— (Note: LCD Soundsystem did not enter the US Billboard 200, but peaked at number 16 on the US Heatseekers Albums Chart.)	—	6	—	51	17	28	—	41	20	BPI: Gold
45:33: Nike+ Original Run	Released: October 17, 2006; Label: Nike+ Sport Music; Format: Download	—	—	—	—	—	—	—	—	—	—	
Sound of Silver	Released: March 12, 2007; Label: DFA, Capitol, EMI; Format: CD, download, vinyl	46	—	26	—	89	14	40	39	60	28	BPI: Gold
This Is Happening	Released: May 17, 2010; Label: DFA, Virgin, Parlophone; Format: CD, download, vinyl	10	11	37	11	37	9	47	14	32	7	BPI: Gold
American Dream	Released: September 1, 2017; Label: DFA, Columbia; Format: CD, cassette, download, vinyl	1	10	14	1	19	3	14	9	41	3	
"—" denotes releases that did not chart or were not released in that territory.

=== Compilation albums ===
List of compilation albums with selected chart positions
Title	Album details	Peak chart positions		
Title	Album details	US Ele.	BEL (Fla.)	UK
45:33	Released: November 12, 2007; Label: DFA, EMI; Format: CD, download, vinyl	7	68	128

=== Remix albums ===
List of remix albums
Title	Album details
Introns	Released: March 14, 2006; Label: DFA; Format: download
45:33 Remixes	Released: September 14, 2009; Label: DFA; Format: CD, download, vinyl

=== Live albums ===
List of live albums and selected chart positions
Title	Album details	Peak chart positions		
Title	Album details	US Ele.	BEL (Wal.)	SCO
London Sessions	Released: November 8, 2010; Label: DFA; Format: CD, Vinyl, download	5	—	—
The Long Goodbye: LCD Soundsystem Live at Madison Square Garden	Released: April 19, 2014; Label: DFA, Warner Bros., Parlophone; Format: CD, vinyl, download	12	—	—
Electric Lady Sessions	Released: February 8, 2019; Label: DFA, Columbia; Format: Vinyl, download	—	146	36

== Extended plays ==
List of extended plays with selected chart positions
Title	EP details
A Bunch of Stuff	Released: September 18, 2007; Label: DFA; Format: download
Confuse the Marketplace	Released: December 10, 2007; Label: DFA; Format: 12"
Some Remixes	Released: August 10, 2018; Label: DFA; Format: download, vinyl

== Singles ==
List of singles, with selected chart positions, showing year released and album name
Title	Year	Peak chart positions										Certifications	Album
Title	Year	US Sales	US Elec.	US Rock	AUS	BEL (Fla.)	FRA	IRE	MEX	NLD	UK	Certifications	Album
"Losing My Edge"	2002	—	— (Note: "Losing My Edge" did not enter the Dance/Electronic Songs chart, but peaked at number 9 on the Dance/Electronic Singles Sales chart.)	—	—	—	—	—	—	—	115		Non-album singles (Note: The songs "Losing My Edge", "Give It Up" and "Yeah" were originally released as non-album singles but were later complied on disc two of the album LCD Soundsystem.)
"Give It Up"	2003	—	—	—	—	—	—	—	—	—	—		Non-album singles
"Yeah"	2004	—	—	—	—	—	—	—	—	—	77		Non-album singles
"Movement"	2004	—	—	—	—	—	—	—	—	—	52		LCD Soundsystem
"Daft Punk Is Playing at My House"	2005	—	—	—	73	56	—	31	—	96	29		LCD Soundsystem
"Disco Infiltrator"	2005	—	—	—	—	—	—	—	—	—	49		LCD Soundsystem
"Tribulations"	2005	—	—	—	—	—	—	49	—	—	59		LCD Soundsystem
"North American Scum"	2007	—	—	—	—	74	—	49	—	—	40		Sound of Silver
"All My Friends"	2007	35	— (Note: "All My Friends" did not enter the Dance/Electronic Songs chart, but peaked at number 10 on the Dance/Electronic Singles Sales chart.)	—	—	—	—	—	—	—	41	BPI: Silver	Sound of Silver
"No Love Lost" / "Poupée de cire, poupée de son" (Note: Released as a split single with Arcade Fire.)	2007	—	—	—	—	—	—	—	—	—	—		Non-album single
"Someone Great"	2007	—	—	—	— (Note: "Someone Great" did not enter the ARIA Singles Chart, but peaked at number 64 on the ARIA Physical Singles chart.)	—	—	—	—	—	—		Sound of Silver
"Time to Get Away"	2008	—	—	—	—	—	—	—	—	—	—		Sound of Silver
"Big Ideas"	2008	—	—	—	—	—	—	—	—	—	—		21: Music from the Motion Picture
"Bye Bye Bayou"	2009	37	—	—	—	—	—	—	—	—	— (Note: "Bye Bye Bayou" did not enter the UK Singles Chart, but peaked at number 87 on the UK Physical Singles Chart Top 100.)		Non-album single
"Pow Pow"	2010	50	—	—	—	—	—	—	16	—	— (Note: "Pow Pow" did not enter the UK Singles Chart, but peaked at number 41 on the UK Physical Singles Chart.)		This Is Happening
"Drunk Girls"	2010	—	—	—	—	—	47	—	10	—	179		This Is Happening
"I Can Change"	2010	— (Note: "I Can Change" did not enter the Dance/Electronic Songs chart, but peaked at number 25 on the Dance/Electronic Digital Songs chart.)	—	—	—	—	85	—	17	—	— (Note: "I Can Change" did not enter the UK Singles Chart, but peaked at number 38 on the UK Physical Singles Chart Top 100.)		This Is Happening
"Throw" (Note: "Throw" was a bonus track on the iTunes edition of This Is Happening.)	2010	—	—	—	—	—	—	—	—	—	—		This Is Happening
"Live Alone"	2011	—	—	—	—	—	—	—	—	—	— (Note: "Live Alone" did not enter the UK Singles Chart, but peaked at number 22 on the UK Physical Singles Chart Top 100.)		Covers
"Christmas Will Break Your Heart"	2015	—	—	—	—	—	—	—	48	—	—		Non-album single
"Call the Police" / "American Dream" (Note: "Call the Police" and "American Dream" were released together as a double-A-side single, but entered charts separately.)	2017	5	—	26	—	— (Note: "Call the Police" did not enter the Ultratop Top 50, but charted as an "extra tip" on the Ultratip chart.)	—	—	—	—	— (Note: "Call the Police" did not enter the UK Singles Chart, but peaked at number 93 on the UK Singles Sales Chart.)		American Dream
"Call the Police" / "American Dream"	2017	—	—	43	—	—	—	—	—	—	—		American Dream
"Tonite"	2017	—	33	—	—	— (Note: "Tonite" did not enter the Ultratop Top 50, but charted as an "extra tip" on the Ultratip chart.)	191	—	43	—	—		American Dream
"Pulse (v.1)"	2017	—	—	—	—	—	—	—	—	—	—		American Dream
"(We Don't Need This) Fascist Groove Thang"	2018	—	—	—	—	—	—	—	—	—	—		Electric Lady Sessions
"New Body Rhumba"	2022	—	—	— (Note: "New Body Rhumba" did not enter the Hot Rock & Alternative Songs chart, but peaked at number 38 on the Adult Alternative Airplay chart.)	—	—	—	—	—	—	— (Note: "New Body Rhumba" did not enter the UK Singles Chart, but peaked at number 100 on the UK Singles Downloads Chart.)		Non-album single
"X-Ray Eyes"	2024	—	—	—	—	—	—	—	—	—	—		TBA
"—" denotes releases that did not chart or were not released in that territory.

== Music videos ==
List of music videos with director
Title	Year	Director
"Losing My Edge"	2002	Karen Fischer; Warren Fischer
"Movement"	2004	–
"Daft Punk Is Playing at My House"	2005	Chris Cairns
"Disco Infiltrator"	2005	Chris Cairns
"Tribulations"	2005	Dougal Wilson
"North American Scum"	2007	Ben Dickinson
"All My Friends"	2007	Tom Kuntz
"Someone Great"	2007	Doug Aitken
"Big Ideas"	2008	Ace Norton
"New York I Love You, But You're Bringing Me Down"	2008	Simon Owens
"Bye Bye Bayou"	2009	–
"Drunk Girls"	2010	James Murphy; Spike Jonze
"Pow Pow"	2010	David Ayer
"Home"	2010	Rich Darge
"Live Alone" (Franz Ferdinand cover)	2011	Lustix
"Tonite"	2017	Joel Kefali
"Oh Baby"	2018	Rian Johnson
"—" denotes music video director is unknown
