= The Long Goodbye: LCD Soundsystem Live at Madison Square Garden =

Live album by LCD Soundsystem
- Released: April 19, 2014
- Recorded: April 2, 2011
- Venues: Madison Square Garden (Manhattan, New York)
- Genres: Dance-punk; electronic rock; electronica; alternative dance; post-punk revival; indie rock; progressive rock; disco; funk
- Length: 188:00
- Labels: DFA; Warner Bros.; Parlophone
- Producer: James Murphy

LCD Soundsystem chronology
London Sessions (2010)	The Long Goodbye: LCD Soundsystem Live at Madison Square Garden (2014)	American Dream (2017)

Professional ratings
Aggregate scores
Source	Rating
Metacritic	75/100
Review scores
Source	Rating
The 405	8/10
AllMusic	3.5/5 stars
The Line of Best Fit	8.5/10 stars
Mojo	(6/10)
Pitchfork	8.1/10
PopMatters	7/10 stars
Record Collector	4/5 stars
Rolling Stone	3.5/5 stars

The Long Goodbye: LCD Soundsystem Live at Madison Square Garden is a live album by the American rock band LCD Soundsystem, released in 2014. It was recorded at Madison Square Garden, New York, in 2011, LCD Soundsystem's final show before their reunion in 2015.

== Show ==
On February 8, 2011, LCD Soundsystem announced that they were disbanding. Their show at Madison Square Garden, New York, April 2, was billed as their final show and sold out in minutes. The band played for more than three hours, with guest appearances from the musicians Reggie Watts, the Juan MacLean, Shit Robot, Planningtorock, and Shannon Funchess, and the Arcade Fire members Win Butler, Will Butler and Régine Chassagne. The concert was also covered in the documentary Shut Up and Play the Hits (2012). LCD Soundsystem reunited in 2015.

== Release ==
The Long Goodbye was released on Record Store Day 2014 as a limited five-LP box set. It was released digitally on May 20th. In 2021, it was re-issued on vinyl and as a three-CD box set.

== Track listing ==
All songs written by James Murphy, unless otherwise notated.

Side A
No.	Title	Writer(s)	Length
1.	"Dance Yrself Clean"		9:48
2.	"Drunk Girls"	Murphy; Pat Mahoney; Gavilán Rayna Russom	3:40
3.	"I Can Change"	Murphy; Mahoney	6:23

Side B
No.	Title	Writer(s)	Length
1.	"Time to Get Away"	Murphy; Mahoney; Tyler Pope	4:08
2.	"Get Innocuous!"	Murphy; Pope	6:53
3.	"Daft Punk Is Playing at My House"		5:15
4.	"Too Much Love"		4:42

Side C
No.	Title	Writer(s)	Length
1.	"All My Friends"	Murphy; Mahoney; Pope	7:20
2.	"Tired/Heart of the Sunrise"	Murphy; Mahoney; Bill Bruford; Chris Squire; Jon Anderson	2:58
3.	"45:33" ("Intro")		1:50
4.	"45:33" ("You Can't Hide")		4:58

Side D
No.	Title	Length
1.	"Sound of Silver"	4:58
2.	"45:33" ("Out in Space")	10:25
3.	"45:33" ("Ships Talking")	9:22

Side E
No.	Title	Writer(s)	Length
1.	"Freak Out/Starry Eyes"		10:25
2.	"Us V Them"	Murphy; Mahoney; Pope	9:21

Side F
No.	Title	Writer(s)	Length
1.	"North American Scum"		5:20
2.	"Bye Bye Bayou"	Alan Vega	4:42

Side G
No.	Title	Writer(s)	Length
1.	"You Wanted a Hit"	Murphy; Al Doyle	7:47
2.	"Tribulations"		4:51
3.	"Movement"		4:16

Side H
No.	Title	Writer(s)	Length
1.	"Yeah (Crass Version)"	Murphy; Tim Goldsworthy	12:35
2.	"Someone Great"		6:32

Side I
No.	Title	Length
1.	"Losing My Edge" (interpolates "Ghost Rider" by Suicide and "Da Funk" by Daft Punk)	8:48
2.	"Home"	7:07
3.	"All I Want"	5:54

Side J
No.	Title	Writer(s)	Length
1.	"Jump into the Fire"	Harry Nilsson	7:16
2.	"New York, I Love You but You're Bringing Me Down" (interpolates music from Twin Peaks written by Angelo Badalamenti and David Lynch)	Murphy; Mahoney; Pope	9:55

== Personnel ==
LCD Soundsystem

- James Murphy – vocals, percussion, synthesizer, organ, keyboards, piano, kalimba
- Tyler Pope – bass, samples, synthesizer, percussion, organ
- Pat Mahoney – drums, synth pads, vocals
- Nancy Whang – synthesizer, vocals, piano, organ, samples, Wurlitzer
- Gavilán Rayna Russom – synthesizer, percussion, piano, Wurlitzer, clavinet, vocals, vocoder
- Matthew Thornley – guitar, percussion, percussion [electronic percussion], bass, synthesizer, electric piano, samples
- Al Doyle – guitar, vocals, percussion, synthesizer, bass, clavinet, trumpet, organ, glockenspiel
- Gunnar Bjerk – synthesizer, programming

Additional musicians

- Jam Rostron (credited as Janine Rostron), Lizzy Yoder, Shannon Funchess, Tiffany Roth – backing vocals
- Mr. Dream and the State Street Singers – choir
- Phil Mossman – guitar, vocals
- David Scott Stone – guitar
- Trevor Sellers – piano
- Colin Stetson – saxophone
- Carter Yasutake – trumpet
- Kelly Pratt – trumpet
- Nick Roseboro – trumpet
- Alberto López – percussion
- Reggie Watts – vocals on "You Can't Hide"
- Juan Maclean, Shit Robot – vocoders
- Jeremy Gara, Régine Chassagne, Will Butler, Win Butler – backing vocals on "North American Scum"

Production

- Bob Weston – mastering
- James Murphy – producer, mixing
- Matthew Thornley – mix engineer
- Gunnar Bjerk – mix engineer
- Colt Steele – mix assistant
- Josh Harris – mix assistant
- Matthew Shaw – mix assistant
- Nelson Nuñez – mix assistant
- Christina Moon – recording
- Steve Revitte – recording
- Michael Vadino – art direction, design, photography
- Ruvan Wijesooriya – photography
- Vivan Thi Tang – photography

== Charts ==
Chart (2021)	Peak position
Hungarian Albums (MAHASZ)	29
