= London Sessions (LCD Soundsystem album) =

Live album by LCD Soundsystem
- Released: November 8, 2010
- Recorded: June 29, 2010
- Studio: Miloco (London)
- Genre: Dance-punk; post-punk revival; indie rock; alternative dance; electronica
- Length: 58:33
- Label: DFA; Virgin; Parlophone
- Producer: James Murphy

LCD Soundsystem chronology
This Is Happening (2010)	London Sessions (2010)	The Long Goodbye: LCD Soundsystem Live at Madison Square Garden (2014)

Professional ratings
Aggregate scores
Source	Rating
Metacritic	81/100
Review scores
Source	Rating
AllMusic	4/5 stars
The A.V. Club	B+
Beats Per Minute	84%
Consequence of Sound	3.5/5 stars
The Irish Times	4/5 stars
Now	4/5 stars
Pitchfork	8.2/10
PopMatters	8/10
Q	4/5 stars
Tom Hull	B+

London Sessions is a live in-studio album by American rock band LCD Soundsystem. It was recorded on June 29, 2010, at "The Pool" recording studio of Miloco Studios in London. A downloadable version of the album was released on November 8, 2010 followed by a physical release on January 24, 2011. The album was described as being recorded in the spirit of Peel Sessions made for the BBC by the late John Peel.

== Track listing ==
All lyrics are written by James Murphy; all music is composed by LCD Soundsystem.

No.	Title	Length
1.	"Us V Them"	8:02
2.	"All I Want"	6:29
3.	"Drunk Girls"	3:41
4.	"Get Innocuous!"	6:52
5.	"Daft Punk Is Playing at My House"	5:03
6.	"All My Friends"	7:31
7.	"Pow Pow"	8:10
8.	"I Can Change"	6:48
9.	"Yr City Is a Sucker"	5:49
Total length:		58:33

== Personnel ==
LCD Soundsystem

- James Murphy – vocals, percussion
- Nancy Whang – keyboards, vocals
- Pat Mahoney – drums, vocals
- Tyler Pope – bass, percussion, vocals
- Gavilán Rayna Russom – synth, keyboards, percussion, vocals
- David Scott Stone - guitar, percussion, vocals, synth
- Matt Thornley – guitar, percussion, vocals
