= This Is Happening =

Studio album by LCD Soundsystem
- Released: May 17, 2010
- Recorded: April 1, 2009 – February 24, 2010
- Studios: The Mansion (Los Angeles); DFA (New York City)
- Genres: Dance-punk; electronica; art rock
- Length: 65:14
- Labels: DFA; Virgin; Parlophone
- Producer: James Murphy

LCD Soundsystem chronology
45:33 Remixes (2009)	This Is Happening (2010)	London Sessions (2010)

LCD Soundsystem studio albums chronology
Sound of Silver (2007)	This Is Happening (2010)	American Dream (2017)

Singles from This Is Happening
- 1. "Pow Pow" Released: April 17, 2010; 2. "Drunk Girls" Released: May 3, 2010; 3. "I Can Change" Released: July 26, 2010; 4. "Throw" Released: 2010

This Is Happening is the fourth studio album by American rock band LCD Soundsystem. It was released first on May 17, 2010, jointly through DFA and Virgin Records in the United States and Parlophone elsewhere. It was recorded over the course of 2009 and early 2010 in the Mansion recording studio in Los Angeles. The first single, "Pow Pow", was released in April 2010, with a music video directed by David Ayer.

Frontman James Murphy cited Bronski Beat, Eurythmics' Sweet Dreams (Are Made of This), and OMD's Orchestral Manoeuvres in the Dark and Organisation as inspirations for This Is Happening. The album is dedicated to Jerry Fuchs (1974–2009), who performed drums live with the band on occasion, in addition to being closely associated with other DFA acts.

== Reception ==
Professional ratings
Aggregate scores
Source	Rating
AnyDecentMusic?	7.7/10
Metacritic	84/100
Review scores
Source	Rating
AllMusic	4/5 stars
The A.V. Club	A
Entertainment Weekly	A
The Guardian	4/5 stars
Los Angeles Times	3/4 stars
MSN Music (Consumer Guide)	A−
NME	8/10
Pitchfork	9.2/10
Rolling Stone	4/5 stars
Spin	8/10

At Metacritic, which assigns a normalized rating out of 100 to reviews from mainstream critics, This Is Happening received an average score of 84, based on 38 reviews, indicating "universal acclaim". It also achieved an ADM Rating of 7.7/10 on another review aggregator, AnyDecentMusic?.

Guardian reviewer Alexis Petridis observed that the album did not contain Sound of Silver's "startling sense of mapping out new territories", instead sticking to a template that worked "incredibly well." Pitchfork's Ryan Dombal awarded it a Best New Music accolade, describing the album as "pretty perfect". In his review for AllMusic, Tim Sendra said that while This Is Happening "doesn't quite reach the monumental heights" of the band's previous album, it still provided proof that LCD Soundsystem was "one of the most exciting and interesting bands around in the 2000s." Sendra commended Murphy's expansion as a lyricist and songwriter, and said that his production on the album "reveal[s] him at the top of his game".

Jody Rosen of Rolling Stone said that the album contains some of Murphy's "most earnest, lovelorn songs", writing: "[Murphy] approaches dance music more like a folkie singer-songwriter than a DJ, as a vehicle for storytelling and confession. In Murphy’s world, dancing isn’t really about transcendence, or letting loose – try as you might to 'dance yrself clean', your crises, midlife and otherwise, follow you onto the floor." "Dance Yrself Clean", the album's first track, "opens with a naive vocal melody accompanied by 8-bit curlicues, before bursting into a gigantic breakbeat-driven block-rocker", wrote Chris Power for the BBC. "It’s as wry and emotionally resonant as it is physically bone-shaking, and nothing else here comes close to matching it." Referencing and softening parts from "Dance Yrself Clean", the album's final track, "Home", was described by Ryan Leas in Stereogum as "one of the most bare and wistful songs in [Murphy's] often arch and cerebral career, its fluttering and chirping synths offering comfort against his aloof and angular predilection".

=== Accolades ===
This Is Happening has appeared on multiple year-end and decade-end lists. According to Metacritic, This Is Happening was the third-highest ranked 2010 album overall on year-end critics lists. This Is Happening was voted the second best album of 2010 on The Village Voice's Pazz & Jop critics' poll for 2010 with 1634 points, nearly half the points of the top album My Beautiful Dark Twisted Fantasy. Pitchfork ranked the songs "All I Want" and "I Can Change" at number eleven and number three respectively as the best tracks of 2010.

Select rankings for This Is Happening
Publication	List	Year	Rank	Ref.
The A.V. Club	"The Best Music of 2010"	2010	4	
Billboard	"Critics' Picks: Billboard's Top 10 Albums of 2010"	2010	6	
Billboard	"The 100 Greatest Albums of the 2010s: Staff Picks"	2019	39	
Clash	"Top 40 Albums of 2010"	2010	9	
The Guardian	"The 40 Best Albums of 2010"	2010	21	
NME	"50 Best Albums of 2010"	2010	4	
NME	"The 500 Greatest Albums Of All Time"	2013	322	
NME	"The Best Albums of the Decade: The 2010s"	2019	34	
Paste Magazine	"The 50 Best Albums of 2010"	2010	1	
Paste Magazine	"The 100 Best Albums of the 2010s"	2019	3	
Pitchfork	"The Top 50 Albums of 2010"	2010	2	
Pitchfork	"The 100 Best Albums of the Decade So Far (2010–2014)"	2014	11	
Pitchfork	"The 200 Best Albums of the 2010s"	2019	52	
Q	"Q Hall of Fame: Best of 2010"	2010	23	
Resident Advisor	"RA Poll: Top 20 Albums of 2010"	2010	11	
Rolling Stone	"30 Best Albums of 2010"	2010	10	
Rolling Stone	"The 100 Best Albums of the 2010s"	2019	10	
Spin	"40 Best Albums of 2010"	2010	4	
Spin	"The 300 Best Albums of the Past 30 Years (1985–2014)"	2015	184	
Time	"Top 10 Albums"	2010	3	
Uncut	"The Wild Mercury Sound 100 of 2010"	2010	38	
The Village Voice	"Pazz & Jop 2010"	2010	2	

== Track listing ==
No.	Title	Writer(s)	Length
1.	"Dance Yrself Clean"	Murphy	8:56
2.	"Drunk Girls"	Murphy; Pat Mahoney; Gavilán Rayna Russom	3:42
3.	"One Touch"	Murphy; Nancy Whang; Russom	7:45
4.	"All I Want"	Murphy	6:41
5.	"I Can Change"	Murphy; Mahoney	5:55
6.	"You Wanted a Hit"	Murphy; Al Doyle	9:06
7.	"Pow Pow"	Murphy; Mahoney; Tyler Pope; Whang	8:23
8.	"Somebody's Calling Me"	Murphy	6:53
9.	"Home"	Murphy	7:53
Total length:			65:14

Deluxe edition bonus tracks
No.	Title	Writer(s)	Length
10.	"Throw" (Paperclip People cover)	Carl Craig	10:01
11.	"Oh You (Christmas Blues)"	Murphy	3:51
Total length:			79:06

== Personnel ==
All personnel and credits for This Is Happening adapted from the album's liner notes.

LCD Soundsystem

- James Murphy – vocals (tracks 1–9), guitar (tracks 1–4, 6, 7, 9), claps (tracks 2–4, 6, 7, 9), drums (tracks 1–4, 6, 9), bass (tracks 2, 4, 6, 8, 9), acoustic piano (tracks 2, 4, 6, 8), EMS VCS3 Putney (tracks 4, 6, 8), Korg Poly Ensemble (tracks 5, 6, 8), EMS PolySynthi (tracks 2, 6), EMS Synthi A (tracks 2, 6), Yamaha CS-60 (tracks 3, 5), Casio MT-68 (tracks 3, 8), percussion (tracks 3, 9), Simmons (tracks 5, 7), cowbell (tracks 5, 7), Roland System 100 (tracks 5, 8), Synare (tracks 6, 7), Wurlitzer electric piano (track 2), tambourine (track 2), Roland TR-606 (track 3), noise (track 3), glockenspiel (track 3), EML 101 (track 3), Casio CT-410V (track 3), Fun Machine (track 4), Roland TR-808 (track 5), Roland SH-101 (track 5), blocks (track 5), scraper (track 5), clapper (track 5), Moog Rogue (track 6), Moog CDX (track 6), Omnichord (track 7), vocoder (track 7), congas (track 7), snaps (track 8), Wurlitzer SideMan (track 8), Sequential Circuits Prophet-600 (track 9), Casio MT-400 (track 9), EMS VCS3 Putney programming (track 9)
- Pat Mahoney – vocals (track 2), drums (track 7)
- Nancy Whang – yells (track 3), vocals (track 7)
- Tyler Pope – bass (track 7)
- Phillip Mossman (Note: Mossman is credited as a member of the band during recording, but is not attributed to any contributions.)

Additional musicians

- Rayna Russom – EMS PolySynthi (track 2), vocals (track 2), whispers (track 3)
- Morgan Wiley – acoustic piano (track 2)
- Al Doyle – guitar (track 6), Yamaha CS-60 (track 6)
- Jayson Green – vocals (track 7)
- Jason Disu – trombone (track 8)
- Matt Thornley – snaps (track 8)
- Matthew Cash – EMS VCS3 Putney (track 9)

Production

- James Murphy – production (tracks 1–9), mixing (tracks 3, 4, 7, 9)
- Dave Sardy – mixing (tracks 2, 5, 6, 8)
- Bob Weston – mastering
- Matthew Thornley – engineering assistance
- Gunnar Bjerk – engineering assistance
- Alec Gomez – engineering assistance
- Andy Brohard – mix assistance
- Alec Gomez – mix assistance
- Cameron Barton – mix assistance

Release

- Keith Wood – management
- Michael Vadino – art direction
- Brett Tabolt – design
- Ruvan Wijesooriya – cover photos
- Craig E. Averill – legal
- Matthew Cash – human

== Charts ==
The album debuted at number ten on the Billboard 200 in its first week on sale, selling approximately 31,000 copies. It also topped Billboard's Dance/Electronic Albums chart the same week of its debut, which dethroned Lady Gaga's The Fame from its five-month reign on the chart for one week. As of January 2016, the album has sold about 211,000 copies in United States, according to Nielsen SoundScan. About 86,800 of those are physical copies, and about 124,500 of those are digital copies.

=== Weekly charts ===
Chart (2010)	Peak position
Australian Albums (ARIA)	11
Austrian Albums (Ö3 Austria)	67
Belgian Albums (Ultratop Flanders)	37
Belgian Albums (Ultratop Wallonia)	51
Danish Albums (Hitlisten)	21
Dutch Albums (Album Top 100)	47
Finnish Albums (Suomen virallinen lista)	41
French Albums (SNEP)	37
German Albums (Offizielle Top 100)	53
Greek Albums (IFPI)	6
New Zealand Albums (RMNZ)	14
Norwegian Albums (VG-lista)	28
Portuguese Albums (AFP)	17
Scottish Albums (Official Charts)	10
Spanish Albums (Promusicae)	49
Swedish Albums (Sverigetopplistan)	32
Swiss Albums (Schweizer Hitparade)	37
UK Albums (Official Charts)	7
US Billboard 200	10
US Top Dance Albums (Billboard)	1

=== Year-end charts ===
Chart (2010)	Position
US Top Dance/Electronic Albums (Billboard)	8
Chart (2011)	Position
US Top Dance/Electronic Albums (Billboard)	16

== Certifications ==
Region	Certification	Certified units/sales
United Kingdom (BPI)	Gold	100,000^{‡}
^{‡} Sales+streaming figures based on certification alone.

== Notes and references ==
Notes
