= Dance Yrself Clean =

Song by LCD Soundsystem

from the album This Is Happening
- Released: May 17, 2010
- Length: 8:56
- Label: DFA; Virgin; Parlophone
- Songwriter: James Murphy
- Producer: James Murphy

"Dance Yrself Clean" is a song recorded by the American band LCD Soundsystem. It is the opening track from their third studio album, This Is Happening, released on May 17, 2010. Soon after its release, "Dance Yrself Clean" was sampled in the track "All Talk" by Kid Cudi. In 2011, an unofficial video of the Muppets containing the song was published.

== Impact ==
Multiple outlets considered it one of the best songs of 2010, such as Beats per Minute, Consequence, Paste, PopMatters, Spectrum Culture, and the Pazz & Jop critics poll. Multiple critics ranked it as one of the best songs of the 2010s, including Business Insider, Consequence, Crack, Paste (at number one), Pitchfork, Stereogum, The Times, and Uproxx. In 2016, Time Out considered it one of the best songs of all time. In 2019, Billboard staff considered it the eighth greatest dance song of the decade.

== Certifications ==
| Region | Certification | Certified units/sales |
|---|---|---|
| New Zealand (RMNZ) | Gold | 15,000^{‡} |
^{‡} Sales+streaming figures based on certification alone.
