= Shut Up and Play the Hits =

- US theatrical release poster
- Directed by: Dylan Southern; Will Lovelace
- Produced by: Lucas Ochoa; Thomas Benski; James Murphy; Terry Felgate
- Starring: LCD Soundsystem; Chuck Klosterman
- Cinematography: Reed Morano
- Edited by: Mark Burnett
- Production company: Pulse Films
- Distributed by: Oscilloscope
- Release dates: 22 January 2012 (Sundance); 4 September 2012 (United Kingdom)
- Running time: 108 minutes
- Country: United Kingdom
- Language: English

Shut Up and Play the Hits is a 2012 British documentary film directed by Dylan Southern and Will Lovelace that follows LCD Soundsystem frontman James Murphy over a 48-hour period, from the day of the band's final gig at Madison Square Garden to the morning after the show. The film also features intermittent segments from an extended interview between Murphy and pop culture writer Chuck Klosterman. The film premiered at the Sundance Film Festival on 22 January 2012, and was released in the USA for one night only on 18 July 2012. UK showings were held on 4 September 2012.

James Murphy performs a duet with comedian and musician Reggie Watts for one song during the show. Several members of the band Arcade Fire provide backing vocals during a performance of "North American Scum". The film's title is a reference to the moment Win Butler of Arcade Fire shouts "shut up and play the hits" as Murphy introduces the song.

The film also features brief appearances from the Juan MacLean, and David and Stephen Dewaele from the band Soulwax (thereby mirroring James Murphy and Nancy Whang's appearances in the Soulwax film Part of the Weekend Never Dies). Comedians Aziz Ansari and Donald Glover can also be seen dancing in the crowd.

The film was released to Blu-ray and DVD on 9 October 2012 in the US and 8 Oct 2012 in the UK, with a digital release on the band's official Facebook page soon afterwards.

A relatively complete audio recording of this concert was released in April 2014, entitled The Long Goodbye: LCD Soundsystem Live at Madison Square Garden.

This film also featured director Spike Jonze on camera work.

== Reception ==
The film was met positively by critics and fans alike, particularly for its concert coverage and direction. On Rotten Tomatoes the film holds a rating of 88%, based on 25 reviews. On Metacritic the film has a score of 72 out of 100, indicating "generally favorable reviews". Henry Barnes of The Guardian wrote that it is a "gorgeously shot concert film that cuts repeatedly between the near-desperate abandon of the show and Murphy, in his apartment the following day, wandering around in his pants and petting the dog".

In November 2012, Shut Up and Play the Hits won the "Best Live Music Coverage" category of the UK Music Video Awards.

== Track list ==
1. "Dance Yrself Clean"
2. "Drunk Girls"
3. "I Can Change"
4. "Time To Get Away"
5. "Get Innocuous!"
6. "Daft Punk Is Playing At My House"
7. "Too Much Love"
8. "All My Friends"
9. "Tired"
10. "45:33 Part One"
11. "45:33 Part Two"
12. "Sound of Silver" (intro)
13. "45:33 Part Four"
14. "45:33 Part Five"
15. "45:33 Part Six"
16. "Freak Out/Starry Eyes"
17. "Us v Them"
18. "North American Scum"
19. "Bye Bye Bayou" (Alan Vega cover)
20. "You Wanted A Hit"
21. "Tribulations"
22. "Movement"
23. "Yeah" (outro)
24. "Someone Great"
25. "Losing My Edge"
26. "Home"
27. "All I Want"
28. "Jump Into The Fire" (Harry Nilsson cover)
29. "New York I Love You, But You're Bringing Me Down"
