= The Four Horsemen (restaurant) =

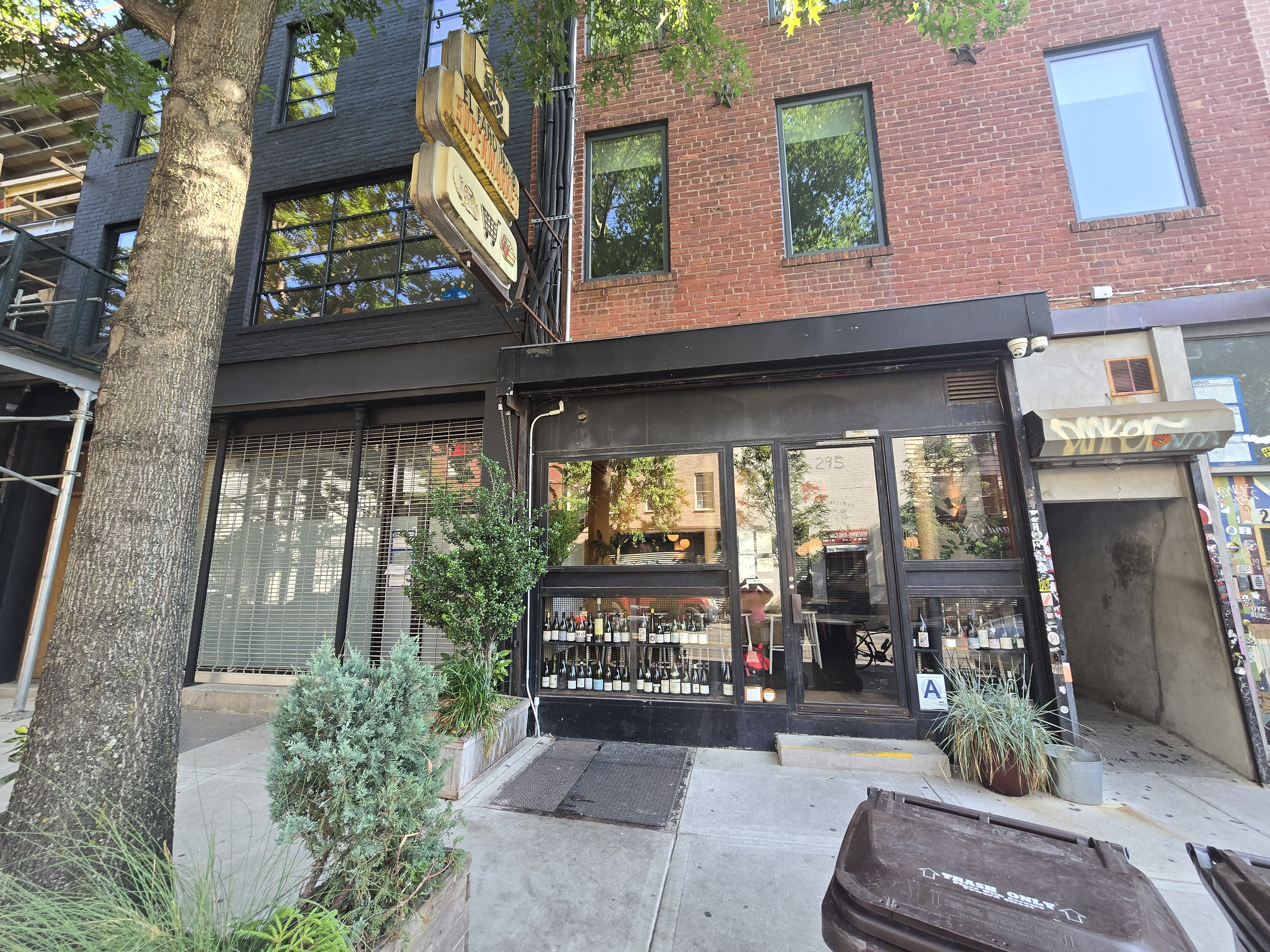
- The storefront for The Four Horsemen
- Interactive map of The Four Horsemen

Restaurant information
- Established: 2015
- Owner: James Murphy
- Head chef: Nick Curtola
- Food type: Tapas; New American
- Rating: (Michelin Guide)
- Location: 295 Grand Street, Brooklyn, New York, 11211, United States
- Coordinates: 40°42′47.1″N 73°57′26.3″W
- Reservations: Recommended
- Website: https://www.fourhorsemenbk.com/

The Four Horsemen is a restaurant and wine bar in the Williamsburg neighborhood of Brooklyn. Their frequently changing New American menu consists of small plates/tapas along with a very wide natural wine selection.

== History ==
James Murphy, front man of LCD Soundsystem and operator of The Four Horseman, discussed opening the restaurant "for years" with Justin Chearno, a wine consultant. The restaurant opened in 2015. Chearno died on August 22, 2024, at the age of 54.

== Reviews and accolades ==
=== Reviews ===
Pete Wells published a positive review of the restaurant in The New York Times in 2019, awarding it two out of four possible stars. Paul de Revere reviewed The Four Horsemen for Pitchfork when the restaurant opened in 2015, and in his review Wells joked that The Four Horsemen "must be the first natural-wine bar" to receive a review from the music publication.

=== Accolades ===
The restaurant was awarded a Michelin star for the first time in 2019, joining the 2020 Michelin Guide. In 2022, the James Beard Foundation awarded their Outstanding Wine Program award to the restaurant.

== See also ==
- List of Michelin-starred restaurants in New York City
