= Pow Pow (song) =

Single by LCD Soundsystem

from the album This Is Happening
- Released: 17 April 2010
- Length: 8:15; 4:25 (radio/video edit)
- Label: DFA Records
- Songwriter: James Murphy
- Producer: James Murphy

LCD Soundsystem singles chronology
"Bye Bye Bayou" (2009)	"Pow Pow" (2010)	"Drunk Girls" (2010)

"Pow Pow" is the first single from American rock band LCD Soundsystem's third album This Is Happening, released on April 17, 2010, to coincide with the 2010 Record Store Day. It was initially released with only 1000 copies of a one-sided vinyl record. The song has been described as similar to LCD Soundsystem's debut single "Losing My Edge".

== Music video ==
In November 2010, a music video was released for the track. The video was directed by David Ayer and starred Academy Award-nominated actress Anna Kendrick as a "shape-shifter" who collects "the souls of wicked men".

== Personnel ==
- James Murphy – guitar, simmons, omnichord, vocoder, vocals, claps, congas, cowbell, synare
- Pat Mahoney – drums
- Tyler Pope – bass
- Nancy Whang – vocals
- Jayson Green – vocals
