= New Body Rhumba =

2022 LCD Soundsystem song

Single by LCD Soundsystem
- Released: September 30, 2022
- Genre: Dance-punk
- Length: 7:24
- Label: DFA; Columbia
- Songwriters: Pat Mahoney; James Murphy; Nancy Whang
- Producer: James Murphy

LCD Soundsystem singles chronology
"(We Don't Need This) Fascist Groove Thang" (2018)	"New Body Rhumba" (2022)	"Dancer" (2023)

"New Body Rhumba" (stylized in all lowercase) is a 2022 song by American rock band LCD Soundsystem, recorded for the soundtrack of the 2022 Noah Baumbach film White Noise. It was released as a digital single on September 30, 2022, through DFA and Columbia Records.

== Background and composition ==
"New Body Rhumba" was written and recorded specifically for the soundtrack to the 2022 Noah Baumbach film White Noise. The film is an adaptation of the 1985 novel of the same name, of which both Baumbach and LCD Soundsystem frontman James Murphy were fans. Baumbach and Murphy are friends and previous collaborators, so Baumbach approached Murphy to create an original song for the film's soundtrack.

The song is written by drummer Pat Mahoney, Murphy, and keyboardist Nancy Whang, with production and mixing by Murphy. Musically, it was described by Jason Jeong of Pitchfork as "geometric, cowbell-friendly dance-punk" and by Alex Hudson of Exclaim! as a vintage dance-punk LCD Soundsystem song. It includes "a jagged guitar loop, clapping percussion, and wiry synths" as well as occasional falsetto vocals from Murphy. The song eventually climaxes with a crescendo that Jeong described as "a swirling electronic dreamscape" that includes "starry synths". Lyrically, the song is introspective with conscious and political commentary. Jeong writes that Murphy "bellows about the capitalist desire for more, more, more ..., mocking a world of fast-casual salads and temp gigs", while Hudson writes that Murphy "[howls] about self-improvement and modern ills".

== Release and reception ==
"New Body Rhumba" was released as a digital single on September 30, 2022, through DFA Records and Columbia Records. It is the first release of original material from LCD Soundsystem in five years and was revealed in August 2022 by Variety. It has been released for consideration for an Academy Award. DFA stated on Instagram that the song will receive a 12-inch single release in the future. The cover art features Murphy donning a mask of Steve Nebesney that Nebesney made for Murphy for Halloween in 2000. Nebesney is a fellow employee at DFA, which Murphy co-founded, as well as a long-time friend of Murphy's, having played together in a gothic rock band during the 1980s.

Justin Curto of Vulture gave a positive review of the track for its "funky, punky bass line" and suggests that the band could win an Academy Award for its inclusion in the film. NPR's Andrew Flanagan relates this to previous LCD Soundsystem songs that "barely skirt[ed] th[e] line" of being anodyne and criticizing this song for having "a tiredness here that wasn't so forefront last time", with "no classic LCD sustain and release. Just a jog across the prairie, for whatever reason." A review of the film in The New York Times highlights the song in particular and notes how the audience at the 79th Venice International Film Festival responded to it positively.

== Personnel ==
Personnel adapted from Tidal.

LCD Soundsystem

- Pat Mahoney – music, lyrics
- James Murphy – music, lyrics, production, mixing
- Nancy Whang – music, lyrics
