= While We're Young (soundtrack) =

While We're Young (Motion Picture Soundtrack)

Soundtrack album by James Murphy and various artists
- Released: March 27, 2015
- Length: 50:20
- Label: Milan

Singles from While We're Young (Motion Picture Soundtrack)
- 1. "Only the Stars Above Welcome Me Home" Released: March 3, 2015; 2. "We Used to Dance" Released: March 17, 2015

While We're Young (Motion Picture Soundtrack) is the soundtrack to the 2015 film While We're Young. The album accompanied three tracks of James Murphy's score along with licensed tracks; it was released through Milan Records on March 27, 2015, preceded by two singles.

== Background ==
James Murphy composed the film score for While We're Young, reteaming with Baumbach after Greenberg (2010). His involvement was confirmed during July 2014. Having shared a professional working relationship with Baumbach after that film, Murphy met him to discuss about the score and musical palette for that film. He discussed several aspects of the music, including the classical pieces of Antonio Vivaldi which Murphy made the synth versions of it, but instead finalized on the original compositions of these classical pieces, as both of the experimentations were trial and error versions. He composed most of the music with this "simple" and "rudimentary" setup utilizing only one synthesizer. It was a back-and-forth process with Murphy taking cues from an edit and compose a piece at his studio which he would send it back to Baumbach.

David Bowie's "Golden Years" is featured prominently in the film. While discussing about that song, Baumbach had few children's music CD stuff which had "weird, children's music versions of things". Discussing those important aspects of other song, he found "Golden Years" being "fun to break down" due to its complicated guitar intro in the first place. He reworked that song using glockenspiel for multiple versions. The film also featured several other licensed songs, handpicked by music supervisor George Drakoulias.

== Release ==
The soundtrack was officially announced in February 2015, featuring 14 tracks, including licensed music and three cues from Murphy's score. Two of the tracks: "Only the Stars Above Welcome Me Home" and "We Used to Dance" were released as singles on March 3 and 17. Milan Records released the soundtrack on March 27, followed by a vinyl edition on May 15, featuring 12 tracks.

== Track listing ==
=== Standard edition ===
No.	Title	Artist(s)	Length
1.	"Golden Years"	James Murphy	1:06
2.	"Concerto for Lute, 2 Violins and Continuo in D, RV. 93"	Antonio Vivaldi	2:27
3.	"All Night Long (All Night)"	Lionel Richie	4:19
4.	"Buggin' Out"	A Tribe Called Quest	3:38
5.	"The Ghost in You"	The Psychedelic Furs	4:10
6.	"The Inch Worm"	Danny Kaye	3:09
7.	"Only the Stars Above Welcome Me Home"	James Murphy	1:40
8.	"Falling" (Duke Dumont Remix)	Haim	5:31
9.	"Eye of the Tiger"	Survivor	4:05
10.	"Andante du Concerto Pour Flautino en ut Majeur"	Antonio Vivaldi	1:50
11.	"Waiting for a Girl Like You"	Foreigner	4:47
12.	"Nineteen Hundred and Eighty-Five"	Paul McCartney and Wings	5:31
13.	"We Used to Dance"	James Murphy	4:07
14.	"Golden Years"	David Bowie	4:00
Total length:			50:20

=== Vinyl edition ===
No.	Title	Artist(s)	Length
1.	"Golden Years"	James Murphy	1:06
2.	"All Night Long (All Night)"	Lionel Richie	4:19
3.	"Buggin' Out"	A Tribe Called Quest	3:38
4.	"The Ghost in You"	The Psychedelic Furs	4:10
5.	"The Inch Worm"	Danny Kaye	3:09
6.	"Only the Stars Above Welcome Me Home"	James Murphy	1:40
7.	"Waiting for a Girl Like You"	Foreigner	4:47
8.	"Falling" (Duke Dumont Remix)	Haim	5:31
9.	"Eye of the Tiger"	Survivor	4:05
10.	"Nineteen Hundred and Eighty-Five"	Paul McCartney and Wings	5:31
11.	"We Used to Dance"	James Murphy	4:07
12.	"Golden Years"	David Bowie	4:00
Total length:			46:03

== Reception ==
Tim Sendra of AllMusic wrote "an odd but fun mix with a little new wave, some classic rock, some Vivaldi, and one "new" song by HAIM, making for a very eclectic listening experience." Lauretta Charlton of Vulture wrote "The music in While We're Young is some of the most eclectic you'll hear on any Baumbach soundtrack, as it pits the old against the new — what was kind of lame then, but totally cool now." Todd McCarthy of The Hollywood Reporter wrote "The musical choices, from Bowie to Vivaldi, are smart and refined." Leonie Cooper of NME wrote "LCD Soundsystem man James Murphy provides an immaculate score". Kate Erbland of Film School Rejects called it a "stellar soundtrack".
