= Christmas Will Break Your Heart =

Single by LCD Soundsystem
- Released: December 24, 2015
- Recorded: December 13, 2015
- Studio: DFA (New York City)
- Genre: Christmas; art rock; indie rock; chamber pop; soft rock
- Length: 4:26
- Label: DFA
- Songwriter(s): Al Doyle; Pat Mahoney; James Murphy; Tyler Pope; Nancy Whang; Morgan Wiley
- Producer(s): James Murphy; Korey Richey; Matthew Shaw

LCD Soundsystem singles chronology
"Live Alone" (2011)	"Christmas Will Break Your Heart" (2015)	"Call the Police" / "American Dream" (2017)

"Christmas Will Break Your Heart" is a song by American rock band LCD Soundsystem. It was released as a download single as well as a limited one-sided 7-inch vinyl on December 24, 2015, making it the band's first single in five years.

== Background and recording ==
Prior to the song's release, in October 2015, there were rumors regarding a possible LCD Soundsystem reunion. It was stated in a Consequence of Sound article that "multiple sources" confirmed that the band would be reuniting in 2016 and that they would be headlining high-profile music festivals. Although this was also confirmed by Billboard, DFA Records label manager Kris Petersen and co-founder Jonathan Galkin both confirmed that LCD Soundsystem would not be reuniting.

Band frontman James Murphy called "Christmas Will Break Your Heart" a "depressing Christmas song" which he had been singing to himself for years prior to its recording. The song was recorded at DFA Studios in New York City on December 13, 2015, after Murphy had gotten past band members Al Doyle, Pat Mahoney, Nancy Whang, and Tyler Pope to come to the studio to record the track. The song was also mastered by American musician Bob Weston. Following the release of the song, it was confirmed in January 2016 by the band that they would be setting off on a reunion tour and releasing a new studio album in the future.

== Release ==
"Christmas Will Break Your Heart" was released on December 24, 2015 (Christmas Eve) as a 7-inch vinyl and digital download. The 7-inch vinyl is one-sided and limited to only 1,000 copies. The song also marked the first single to be released by the band in four years, following the single "Live Alone", which was released in April 2011.

== Track listing ==
7-inch vinyl and download
No.	Title	Length
1.	"Christmas Will Break Your Heart"	4:26

== Charts ==
Chart (2016)	Peak position
Mexico Ingles Airplay (Billboard)	48

== Release history ==
Region	Date	Format	Label	Ref.
United States	December 24, 2015	7-inch; download; streaming	DFA	
