= Big Ideas (song) =

Single by LCD Soundsystem

from the album 21 - Music from the Motion Picture
- B-side: "Babytalk Remix"
- Released: August 11, 2008
- Genre: Electronic rock; hard rock; post-punk revival; disco-punk; funk rock
- Length: 5:40 (Album version); 4:05 (Radio edit)
- Label: DFA
- Songwriter: James Murphy
- Producers: James Murphy; Dave Sardy

LCD Soundsystem singles chronology
"Time to Get Away" (2008)	"Big Ideas" (2008)	"Bye Bye Bayou" (2009)

"Big Ideas" is a song by LCD Soundsystem, released as a single on August 11, 2008. It was originally written for the film 21 and appears on its soundtrack album.

This song was ranked number 63 on Rolling Stone's list of the 100 Best Singles of 2008.

== Track listing ==
Side A
No.	Title	Length
1.	"Big Ideas"	5:40

Side B
No.	Title	Length
1.	"Big Ideas" (Babytalk Remix)
