= Movement (LCD Soundsystem song) =

Single by LCD Soundsystem

from the album LCD Soundsystem
- B-side: "Yr City's a Sucker"
- Released: November 8, 2004
- Recorded: 2004
- Genre: No wave; garage punk
- Length: 3:03
- Label: DFA
- Songwriter(s): James Murphy
- Producer(s): The DFA

LCD Soundsystem singles chronology
"Yeah" (2004)	"Movement" (2004)	"Daft Punk Is Playing at My House" (2005)

"Movement" is a song by American rock band LCD Soundsystem. It was released as a single on 8 November 2004 through DFA Records and appeared on their eponymous debut studio album, released in 2005.

== Background ==
Band frontman James Murphy has described the impetus of the song:

That's mostly about the 'new rock', which is a movement without the bother of having any meaning. You know a journalistic movement that announces, 'Rock is back! The guitar is back!' Whoo-hoo. But for what? Its like saying, 'The high-waisted pant is back!' Its fucking vacuous and the bands are tedious. They all sound like The MC5. I get excited about The White Stripes 'cos they're some people who are obviously trying to do something of their own. But most bands will never be good because they don't even ask themselves why they're bothering until its too late.

The song stylistically pays tribute to The Fall, who Murphy has cited as a significant influence, and interpolates a lyric from that band's track "Telephone Thing".

== Track listing ==
- DFA — dfaemi 2141 — 7" vinyl and CD single

Side A
No.	Title	Length
1.	"Movement"	3:03

Side B
No.	Title	Length
1.	"Yr City's a Sucker"	5:22

== Charts ==
Chart (2004)	Peak position
UK Singles (OCC)	52
