= Greenberg (soundtrack) =

2010 album

Greenberg: Original Motion Picture Soundtrack

Soundtrack album by James Murphy, et al.
- Released: March 22, 2010
- Label: DFA Records, Parlophone

Greenberg: Original Motion Picture Soundtrack is the soundtrack to Noah Baumbach's film Greenberg. It includes LCD Soundsystem musician and DFA Records co-founder James Murphy's debut film score, as well as songs by other artists.

== Track listing ==
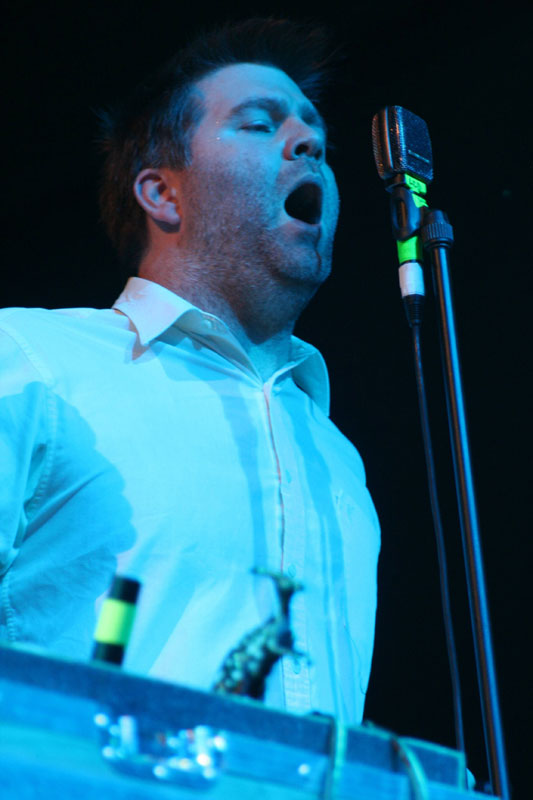
"Sounds nothing like LCD, really, which cracks us [he and Baumbach] both up."—James Murphy

1. Steve Miller Band: "Jet Airliner"
2. James Murphy: "People"
3. Nite Jewel: "Suburbia"
4. James Murphy: "Sleepy Baby"
5. James Murphy: "Thumbs"
6. Albert Hammond: "It Never Rains in Southern California"
7. James Murphy: "Plenty of Time"
8. James Murphy: "Photographs"
9. James Murphy: "Gente"
10. Galaxie 500: "Strange"
11. LCD Soundsystem: "Oh You (Christmas Blues)"
12. James Murphy: "Birthday Song"
13. James Murphy: "Dear You"
14. The Sonics: "Shot Down"
15. Duran Duran: "The Chauffeur"
16. James Murphy: "If You Need a Friend"
17. James Murphy : "Please Don't Follow Me"
18. James Murphy: "Photographs (Piano)"
