= Bye Bye Bayou =

Single by LCD Soundsystem
- Released: November 7, 2009
- Recorded: November 2009; The Mansion (Los Angeles, California)
- Genre: Dance-punk
- Label: DFA Records
- Songwriter(s): Alan Vega
- Producer(s): James Murphy

LCD Soundsystem singles chronology
"Big Ideas" (2008)	"Bye Bye Bayou" (2009)	"Pow Pow" (2010)

"Bye Bye Bayou" is a single by LCD Soundsystem released on November 7, 2009, to coincide with the Record Store Day offshoot, Vinyl Saturday. The song itself is a cover of Suicide vocalist Alan Vega's 1980 song of the same name.

== Track listing ==
A. "Bye Bye Bayou" (Main Version) - 7:10
B. "Bye Bye Bayou" (A Capella Version) - 6:51
