= Drunk Girls =

Single by LCD Soundsystem

from the album This Is Happening
- B-side: Wooden Shjips Version; Holy Ghost! Remix
- Released: May 3, 2010
- Recorded: 2009–2010
- Genre: Dance-punk; post-punk; new wave
- Length: 3:42
- Label: DFA
- Songwriter(s): Pat Mahoney; James Murphy; Gavin Russom
- Producer(s): James Murphy

LCD Soundsystem singles chronology
"Pow Pow" (2010)	"Drunk Girls" (2010)	"I Can Change" (2010)

Professional ratings
Review scores
Source	Rating
Rolling Stone	4/5 stars

"Drunk Girls" is a song by American rock band LCD Soundsystem. It was released as the second single from their third studio album, This Is Happening (2010), on May 3, 2010. Band frontman James Murphy has described the song as "dumb" but added "I like dumb, short stuff." Structurally, the song contains call-and-response elements similar to The Velvet Underground song "White Light/White Heat". The 7" single features a cover of the song by San Francisco psychedelic rock band Wooden Shjips.

== Music video ==
The music video for the single was co-directed by Spike Jonze and James Murphy. The video features Murphy and bandmates Nancy Whang and Pat Mahoney attempting to sing while being abused by people dressed as pandas. The video was shot at Factory Studios in Brooklyn, NY.

== Reception ==
Kevin O'Donnell of Rolling Stone gave it a four star review, feeling it was "Murphy's tightest, most accessible track yet — a four-minute disco party that brings together chugging guitar riffs, hand claps and shrieks, plus a rocket-propelled beat and a buoyant two-word hook ("Drunk girls!") that sounds vaguely Bowie-esque." and concluded it "isn't a reinvention for LCD Soundsystem, but it's sure to induce rampant fist-pumping from inebriates of both genders."

== Track listing ==
=== 7" single ===
A. Drunk Girls
B. Drunk Girls (Wooden Shjips version)

=== 12" single ===
A. Drunk Girls
B. Drunk Girls (Holy Ghost! remix)

== Charts ==
Chart (2010)	Peak position
France (SNEP)	47
UK Singles (Official Charts Company)	179
