= Yeah (LCD Soundsystem song) =

Single by LCD Soundsystem

from the album LCD Soundsystem
- B-side: Pretentious Version; Clap-a-Pella
- Released: January 13, 2004
- Recorded: 2003
- Genre: Dance-punk; indietronica; electroclash; acid house
- Length: 9:20 (Crass Version); 11:03 (Pretentious Version)
- Label: DFA
- Songwriters: Tim Goldsworthy; James Murphy
- Producer: The DFA

LCD Soundsystem singles chronology
"Give It Up" (2003)	"Yeah" (2004)	"Movement" (2004)

"Yeah" is a song by American rock band LCD Soundsystem. It was released as a 12-inch single through DFA Records on January 13, 2004. The Crass and Pretentious mixes of "Yeah" later appeared on the CD version of the band's eponymous debut studio album. The song peaked at number 77 on the UK Singles Chart.

== Overview ==
In a 2005 interview with Pitchfork, LCD Soundsystem frontman James Murphy regarded "Yeah" as the hardest song to make for their debut studio album, stating that it "nearly killed" him. According to Pitchfork's longform article "You Were There", the song "aims to sum up three decades of dance music."

== Track listing ==
- DFA Records — dfa 2133 — 12" vinyl single
- Yeah (Clap-a-Pella) does not appear on the 2013 remastered 12"

Side A
No.	Title	Length
1.	"Yeah" (Crass Version)	9:20

Side B
No.	Title	Length
1.	"Yeah" (Pretentious Version)	11:03
2.	"Yeah" (Clap-a-Pella)	2:04

== Personnel ==
Personnel adapted from single liner notes.

- Eric Broucek – additional programming, percussion, vocals
- Mandy Coon – vocals
- The DFA – mixing, production
- Tim Goldsworthy – bass synthesizer
- James Murphy – bass, drums, keyboards, percussion, vocals
- Gavilán Rayna Russom – Fun Machine support, synthesizer, synthesizer support
- Nancy Whang – vocals

== Charts ==
Chart (2004)	Peak position
UK Singles (OCC)	77

== Release history ==
Region	Date	Label	Format	Catalogue no.
United Kingdom	January 13, 2004	Output	12"	OPR DFA 009
United States	January 13, 2004	DFA	12"	dfa 2133
United States	January 2013	DFA	12"	dfa 2133r
