= I Can Change (LCD Soundsystem song) =

Single by LCD Soundsystem

from the album This Is Happening
- B-side: Stereogamous Dub (12")
- Released: July 26, 2010
- Genre: Synth-pop; new wave
- Length: 5:56
- Label: DFA
- Songwriters: Pat Mahoney; James Murphy
- Producer: James Murphy

LCD Soundsystem singles chronology
"Drunk Girls" (2010)	"I Can Change" (2010)	"Throw" (2010)

"I Can Change" is a song by American rock band LCD Soundsystem. The song was released as the third official single from the band's third studio album This Is Happening, on May 29, 2010. It was written by band member Pat Mahoney and band frontman James Murphy and was produced by the DFA. The song was featured on the soundtrack for the video game FIFA 11 and peaked at number 85 on the French Singles Chart. Ezra Furman has recorded an acoustic cover of the song.

== Track listing ==
=== 12" vinyl ===
- DFA 22591

Side A
No.	Title	Length
1.	"I Can Change"	5:56
2.	"I Can Change" (Stereogamous Remix)	8:34

Side B
No.	Title	Length
1.	"I Can Change" (Stereogamous Inlovestrumental Dub)	7:33

=== CD ===
- DFA 2259X

No.	Title	Length
1.	"I Can Change" (Radio edit)	4:04
2.	"I Can Change" (Album version)	5:56
3.	"I Can Change" (Instrumental)	5:56

=== Digital download ===
iTunes release
No.	Title	Length
1.	"I Can Change"	5:56
2.	"You Wanted a Hit" (Soulwax Remix)	7:38
3.	"I Can Change" (Tiga Remix)	7:46
4.	"I Can Change" (Stereogamous Remix)	8:34
5.	"I Can Change" (Stereogamous Inlovestrumental Dub)	7:33

== Charts ==
Chart (2010)	Peak position
France (SNEP)	85
