= Daft Punk Is Playing at My House =

Single by LCD Soundsystem

from the album LCD Soundsystem
- B-side: "Jump into the Fire"; Soulwax Remix
- Released: January 14, 2005
- Recorded: 2003–04
- Genre: Dance-punk; electroclash
- Length: 5:16
- Label: DFA; EMI
- Songwriter: James Murphy
- Producer: The DFA

LCD Soundsystem singles chronology
"Movement" (2004)	"Daft Punk Is Playing at My House" (2005)	"Disco Infiltrator" (2005)

"Daft Punk Is Playing at My House" is the second single from LCD Soundsystem's self-titled album, released on January 14, 2005. The music video are homages to Spike Jonze's and Michel Gondry's music videos for Daft Punk's "Da Funk" and "Around the World". The track reached number one on the UK Dance Chart and number 29 on the UK singles chart.

== Accolades and legacy ==
The song was nominated for the 2006 Grammy Award for Best Dance Recording.

The song featured in the video games FIFA 06, SSX On Tour, Burnout: Revenge, Forza Motorsport 2 and the Dance Dance Revolution games Hottest Party 3 and X2. The song was also featured in the 2009 film The Limits of Control, the 2012 comedy film Project X, the 2013 comedy-action film The Heat, and the 2019 television miniseries Looking for Alaska.

It was also covered by British punk rock band Soft Play, as part of their BBC Radio 1 Live Lounge session. During his 30-show residency at Madison Square Garden 2026, Harry Styles interpolated the song while performing "Kiwi".

== Track listing ==
CD
No.	Title	Length
1.	"Daft Punk Is Playing at My House (radio edit)"	3:21
2.	"Daft Punk Is Playing at My House (Soulwax Shibuya Mix)"	6:52

12" vinyl
No.	Title	Length
1.	"Daft Punk Is Playing at My House (album version)"	5:16
2.	"Daft Punk Is Playing at My House (Soulwax Shibuya Mix)"	6:52

7" vinyl
No.	Title	Writer(s)	Length
1.	"Daft Punk Is Playing at My House (radio edit)"		3:21
2.	"Jump into the Fire (Radio 1 Live Session)"	Harry Nilsson	5:56

== Personnel ==
- Eric Broucek – handclaps, sounds
- James Murphy – vocals, synthesizers, bass guitar, guitar, drum machine, cowbell

== Charts ==
Chart (2005)	Peak position
Australia (ARIA)	73
Belgium (Ultratip Bubbling Under Flanders)	6
Belgium Dance (Ultratop Flanders)	13
Netherlands (Single Top 100)	96
UK Singles (Official Charts)	29
UK Dance (Official Charts)	1
