= Yamaha CS-60 =

Polyphonic analogue synthesizer

- Manufacturer: Yamaha
- Dates: 1977
- Price: $3,999

Technical specifications
- Polyphony: 8 voices
- Timbrality: 1 part
- Oscillator: 1
- LFO: 1 Noise, Saw Up, Saw Down, Sine, Square
- Synthesis type: Analog Subtractive
- Filter: 1 12dB Slope (2-pole), High Pass, Low Pass, Resonance
- Attenuator: ADSR
- Aftertouch expression: Yes, polyphonic
- Velocity expression: Yes
- Storage memory: 12 presets, 1 user patch
- Effects: Ring modulation

Input/output
- Keyboard: 61 non-weighted keys
- Left-hand control: Aftertouch, Knobs, Mod - Ribbon, Pedal - Sustain, Velocity

The Yamaha CS-60 is a polyphonic analog synthesizer manufactured in Japan. It was released in 1977 and is the smaller and cheaper version of the popular Yamaha CS-80. The CS-60 lacks the polyphonic aftertouch of the CS-80.

== Preset Sounds ==
String 1, String 2, Brass 1, Brass 2, Flute, Electric Piano, Clavicord, Harpsichord, Guitar 1, Guitar 2, Funky 1, Funky 2, Memory, Panel.

== Notable users ==
- Air
- Jean-Michel Jarre
- Oshe
- Bob Marley and the Wailers
- Page McConnell

== See also ==
- CS-15
- CS-80
- List of Yamaha Synthesizers & Samplers
