= Losing My Edge =

Single by LCD Soundsystem

from the album LCD Soundsystem
- B-side: "Beat Connection (Extended Disco Dub)"
- Released: July 2002
- Genre: Dance-punk; alternative dance; techno; electroclash
- Length: 7:53 (single version); 4:23 (video edit)
- Label: DFA (US); Output (UK)
- Songwriter: James Murphy
- Producer: The DFA

LCD Soundsystem singles chronology
"Losing My Edge" (2002)	"Give It Up" (2003)

"Losing My Edge" is the debut single by American rock band LCD Soundsystem. It was released as a 12-inch single in July 2002, through DFA Records. It was later featured on the CD version of their eponymous debut studio album. "Losing My Edge" peaked at number 115 on the UK Singles Chart. It was also listed at number 13 on Pitchfork's Top 500 Songs of the 2000s list. In October 2011, NME placed it at number 40 on its "150 Best Tracks of the Past 15 Years" list. In June 2018, Rolling Stone listed it at number 77 on its "The 100 Greatest Songs of the Century – So Far" list.

== Background ==
In an interview with the music site "ireallylovemusic", Murphy explained his inspiration for the song: "When I was DJing, playing Can, Liquid Liquid, ESG, all that kind of stuff, I became kind of cool for a moment, which was a total anomaly. And when I heard other DJs playing similar music ...I was afraid that this new found coolness was going to go away and that's where 'Losing My Edge' comes from."

== Composition ==
"Losing My Edge" is a dance-punk, alternative dance, techno, and electroclash song. It features a rhythm similar to "Change" by Killing Joke. DFA Records cofounder Tim Goldsworthy admitted that "Losing My Edge" was "a rip-off of a Killing Joke track".

== Artists mentioned ==
- Can
- Suicide
- Captain Beefheart
- Daft Punk
- Larry Levan
- Peech Boys
- The Modern Lovers
- Niagara
- Yazoo
- This Heat
- Pere Ubu
- The Outsiders
- The Nation of Uylsses
- Mars
- The Trojans
- The Black Dice
- Todd Terry
- Germs
- Section 25
- Althea & Donna
- Sexual Harassment
- A-ha
- Dorothy Ashby
- Public Image Ltd
- Fania All-Stars
- Bar-Kays
- The Human League
- The Normal
- Lou Reed
- Scott Walker
- The Monks
- Joy Division
- Laurent Garnier
- The Creation
- Rammellzee
- Sun Ra
- The Scientists
- Royal Trux
- 10cc
- Eric B. and Rakim
- The Index
- Basic Channel
- Soulsonic Force
- Juan Atkins
- Manuel Göttsching
- David Axelrod
- Electric Prunes
- Gil Scott-Heron
- The Slits
- Faust
- Mantronix
- Pharaoh Sanders
- The Fire Engines
- Swans
- Soft Cell
- The Sonics

== Track listing ==
- dfa 2123

Side A
No.	Title	Length
1.	"Losing My Edge"	7:53
Total length:		7:53

Side B
No.	Title	Length
1.	"Beat Connection" (Extended Disco Dub)	7:50
Total length:		7:50

== Personnel ==
Personnel adapted from the liner notes of the single's Record Store Day 2012 release.

- Alex Epton – synthesizer
- James Murphy – vocals, bass, composing, drums, programming, synthesizer
- Bob Weston – mastering (Note: Remastering, only for the song's remastered re-release.)
- Nancy Whang – vocals

== Charts ==
Chart (2003)	Peak position
UK Singles (Official Charts Company)	115

== Release history ==
Region	Date	Label	Format	Catalogue no.
US	July 2002	DFA	12"	dfa 2123
UK	2002	Output	12"	OPRDFA002
US	April 21, 2012	DFA	12" (Record Store Day)	dfa 2123r
