= LCD Soundsystem =

American rock band

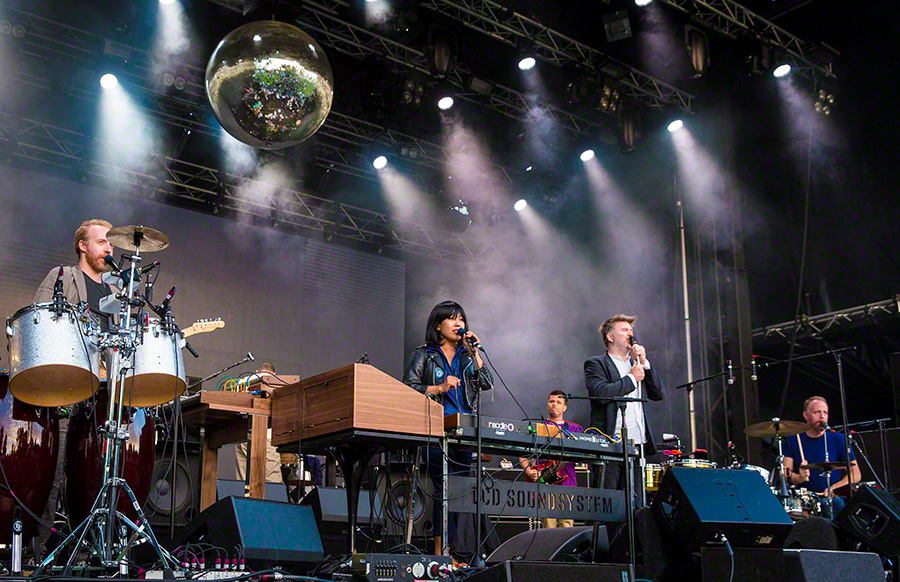
- LCD Soundsystem in 2016

Background information
- Origin: Brooklyn, New York, US
- Genres: Dance-punk revival; dance-rock; electronic rock; electronica; art rock; alternative dance
- Works: LCD Soundsystem discography
- Years active: 2002–2011; 2015–present
- Labels: DFA; Columbia; EMI; Capitol; Virgin; Warner Bros.
- Members: James Murphy; Nancy Whang; Pat Mahoney; Tyler Pope; Al Doyle; Korey Richey; Nay Mapalo
- Past members: Phil Mossman; Matt Thornley; Gavilán Rayna Russom
- Website: lcdsoundsystem.com

LCD Soundsystem is an American rock band formed in 2002 in Brooklyn, New York, by James Murphy. It comprises Murphy (vocals, various instruments), Nancy Whang (synthesizer, keyboards, vocals), Pat Mahoney (drums), Tyler Pope (bass, guitar, synthesizer), Al Doyle (guitar, synthesizer, percussion), and Korey Richey (synthesizer, piano, percussion). They have been signed to Murphy's label DFA Records since their inception, and signed to Columbia Records in 2016.

LCD Soundsystem released its debut single, "Losing My Edge", in 2002. Their debut album, LCD Soundsystem (2005), received acclaim and a Grammy Award nomination for Best Electronic/Dance Album. Their most successful single, "Daft Punk Is Playing at My House", received a Grammy nomination for Best Dance Recording. In 2006, LCD Soundsystem released 45:33, commissioned as workout music for Nike. In 2007, they released Sound of Silver to acclaim and another Grammy nomination for Best Electronic/Dance Album. This Is Happening (2010) was their first top-ten US album.

In 2011, LCD Soundsystem disbanded and played a sold-out farewell concert at Madison Square Garden, New York. It was followed by the documentary Shut Up and Play the Hits (2012) and the live album The Long Goodbye (2014). In 2015, they reunited, released the single "Christmas Will Break Your Heart" and embarked a tour. Their fifth album, American Dream (2017), was their first US number-one album. It was nominated for Best Alternative Music Album at the 60th Annual Grammy Awards, and the single "Tonite" won for Best Dance Recording. LCD Soundsystem have since played a series of concert residencies, released two further singles, and are working on a sixth album.

LCD Soundsystem blends live instrumentation with electronic instruments such as analog synthesizers and drum machines, incorporating elements of post-punk, electronica and dance. Murphy's lyrics combine irony and sincerity, with themes of aging, love and letting go. LCD Soundsystem is associated with the hipster subculture of the 2000s. By the time of its disbandment in 2011, it had become one of the most acclaimed and influential American bands. Sound of Silver has been named one of the greatest albums by multiple publications, and in 2013 Rolling Stone named LCD Soundsystem one of its "new immortals", acts they predicted would "stand the test of time".

== History ==
=== First singles and debut album (2002–2005) ===
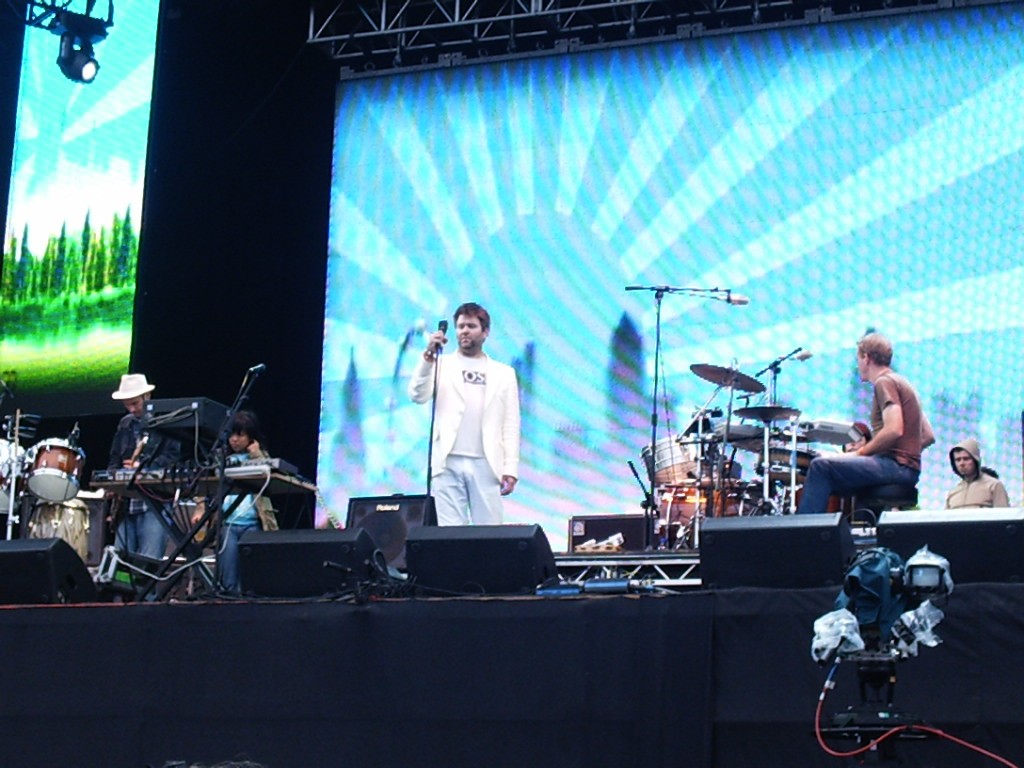
LCD Soundsystem in Madrid in 2005

LCD Soundsystem emerged as part of the New York City post-punk revival scene in the 2000s. It was founded by James Murphy, who began working as a producer in the 2000s and co-founded the record label DFA. After producing the Rapture, Murphy was disappointed when they signed to Universal Records. Murphy had recently lost his parents, split with his girlfriend and was sleeping in his office. He described it as a "lonely period ... But something really radical happened. It broke me free, in a way." Mattie Safer of the Rapture said James did not prioritize his own music until the Rapture left DFA.

The first LCD Soundsystem single, "Losing My Edge", was released in 2002. Paul Lester described it as "an eight-minute, laugh-out-loud funny dissection of cool over a dirty electronic beat". Pitchfork wrote later that it set the parameters for future LCD Soundsystem songs: "dance vs. punk, sincerity vs. sarcasm, wordy self-analysis vs. surrendering to the rhythm". It was followed by further singles, including "Yeah" and "Tired".

LCD Soundsystem released its first album, LCD Soundsystem, in January 2005. It received acclaim and was voted number 11 in that year's Pazz & Jop, an annual poll of hundreds of music critics. "Daft Punk Is Playing at My House", which imagines Daft Punk performing at a house party, became their most successful single, reaching number 29 on the UK singles chart. In December 2005, LCD Soundsystem was nominated for the Grammy awards for Best Electronic/Dance Album and Best Dance Recording (for "Daft Punk Is Playing at My House)". Initially, LCD Soundsystem records were written, performed, and recorded solely by Murphy, with Nancy Whang contributing backing vocals. He recruited members for live shows. LCD Soundsystem toured with M.I.A.

=== "45:33" and Sound of Silver (2006–2008) ===
In October 2006, LCD Soundsystem released a 45-minute composition, "45:33", commissioned by Nike. In a press release, Murphy said it was designed to accompany a running workout. However, he later said he had lied and had instead wanted to make a long record in the style of E2-E4 (1984) by Manuel Göttsching.

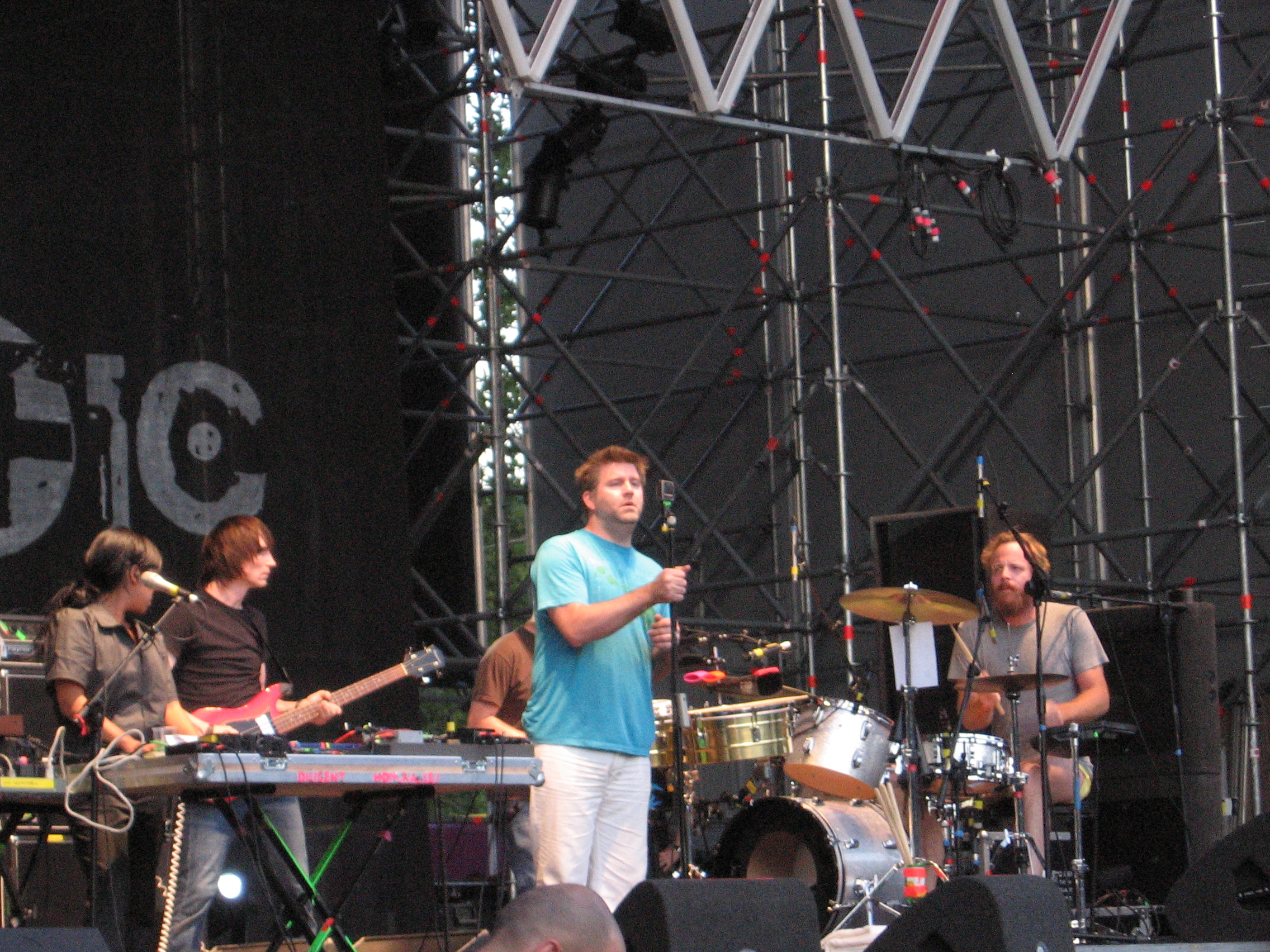
LCD Soundsystem in Turin, Italy, in 2007

LCD Soundsystem's third album, Sound of Silver, was released on March 20, 2007, to acclaim. It was nominated for the Grammy for Best Electronic/Dance Album and named the album of the year by The Guardian, Uncut and Drowned in Sound. "North American Scum", "All My Friends" and "Someone Great" were released as singles. In September 2007, LCD Soundsystem released the EP A Bunch of Stuff and toured with Arcade Fire.

Sound of Silver was nominated for the 2007 Shortlist Music Prize, but lost to The Reminder by Feist. Time named "All My Friends" the fourth-best song of 2007, with Josh Tyrangiel writing that its "straightforward repetition of the same guitar, keyboard and bass lines, combined with lyrics about life without regret, and life with all kinds of regrets pays off with a punch about what we lose as we get older". It was named the second-best song of the 2000s by Pitchfork. After finishing touring for Sound of Silver, LCD Soundsystem released a song, "Big Ideas", for the soundtrack of the 2008 film 21. Rolling Stone named it the 63rd-best song of the year.

=== This Is Happening, disbandment and farewell show (2009–2014) ===
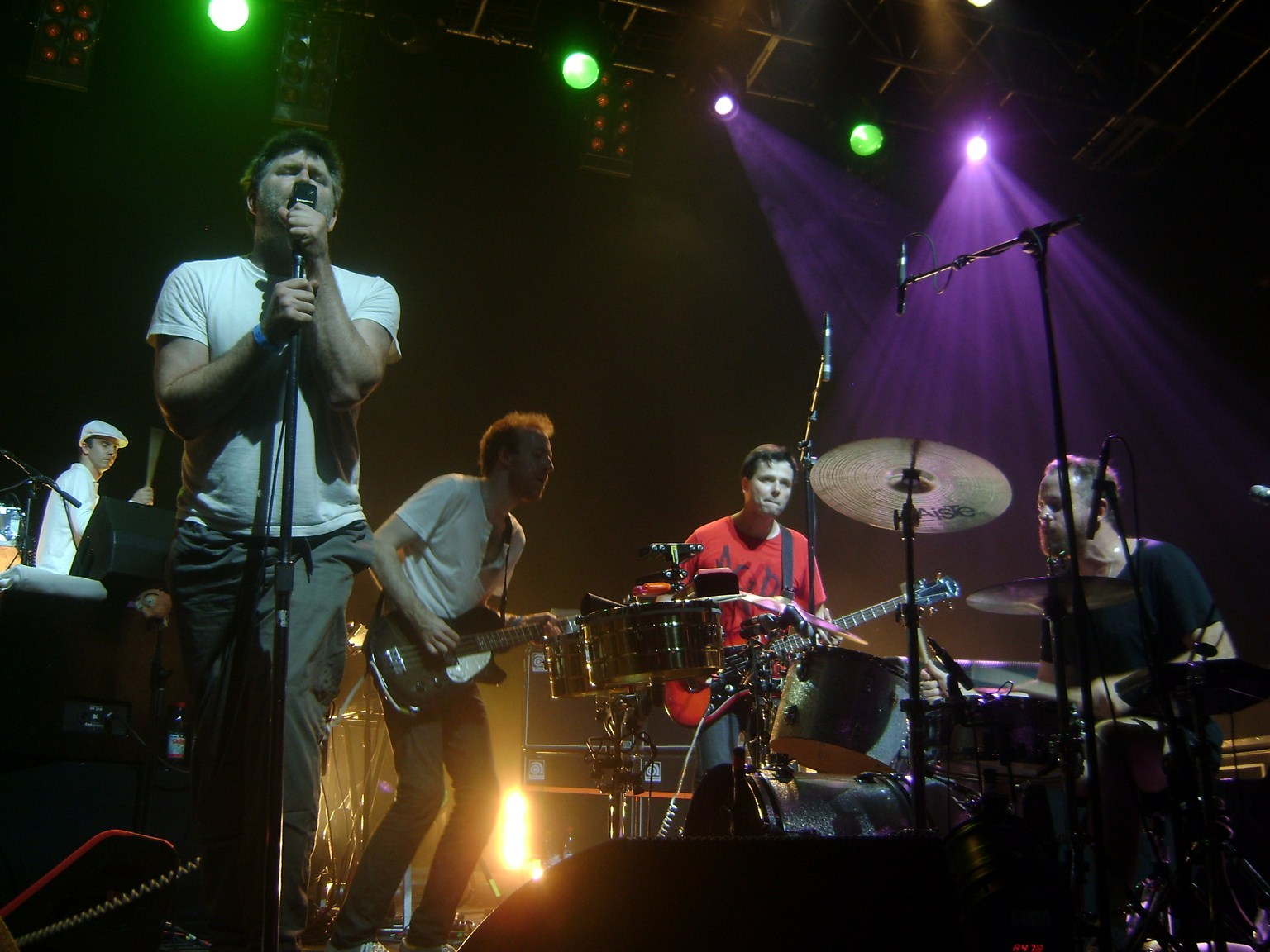
LCD Soundsystem in Santiago, Chile, in 2011

For Record Store Day 2009, LCD Soundsystem released a cover of the Alan Vega song "Bye Bye Bayou". In April 2010, they performed two secret gigs in New York at the Music Hall of Williamsburg and Webster Hall. Their third album, This Is Happening, was released in May 2010, promoted with singles including "Drunk Girls". Murphy said he expected it to be their final album. For Record Store Day 2010, they released 1000 copies of a single-sided 12" single of the This Is Happening track "Pow Pow".

On February 8, 2011, LCD Soundsystem announced that they were disbanding. Murphy said it had become bigger than he planned and he wanted to pursue other projects. Additionally, he said he did not want to continue LCD Soundsystem past the age of 40, was uncertain if EMI would release another LCD Soundsystem album, had become sick of touring, and wanted to "go out happy".

Tickets for LCD Soundsystem's farewell show at Madison Square Garden on April 2 sold out in minutes. They played for more than three hours, with guest appearances from musicians including Reggie Watts and members of Arcade Fire. The concert was followed by the documentary Shut Up and Play the Hits (2012) and the live album The Long Goodbye (2014). Following the disbandment, Murphy became a father, directed films, opened a wine bar, created a mobile DJ sound system with the band Soulwax, contributed to the David Bowie album Blackstar (2016), produced albums for the Yeah Yeah Yeahs and Arcade Fire, and launched a brand of coffee.

=== Reunion (2015–2016) ===
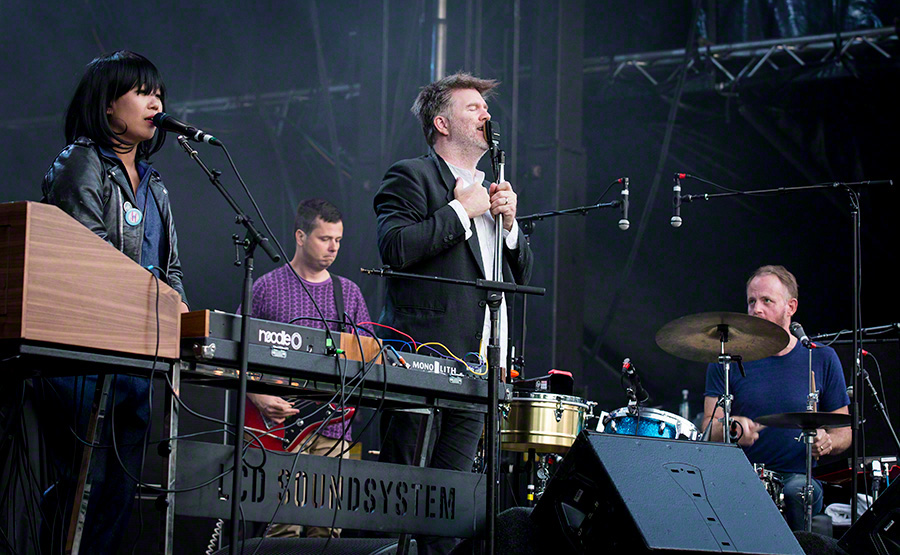
LCD Soundsystem in 2016

On December 24, 2015, LCD Soundsystem released their first single in five years, "Christmas Will Break Your Heart". On January 4, 2016, LCD Soundsystem was announced as the headline act of the 2016 Coachella Festival. The following day, they confirmed they would tour and release a new album. Murphy said he had written new music and, after consulting the other members, had decided to reunite LCD Soundsystem rather than create a new project. He later said Bowie had convinced them to reunite; Bowie said if the idea made him uncomfortable then he should pursue it. The reunion angered some fans, who felt it cheapened the "farewell" show at Madison Square Garden. Murphy released an apology, saying he had underestimated the response.

On February 13, 2016, LCD Soundsystem signed with Columbia Records. In March, they performed two shows at Webster Hall in East Village, Manhattan, in March, their first in almost five years. Tickets were distributed by lottery. During the rest of 2016, they headlined the Outside Lands, Primavera Sound, Austin City Limits, Bonnaroo, LouFest, Lollapalooza Festival and Wayhome festivals. In August, LCD Soundsystem canceled shows in Asia and Australia to complete their next album.

=== American Dream (2017–2019) ===
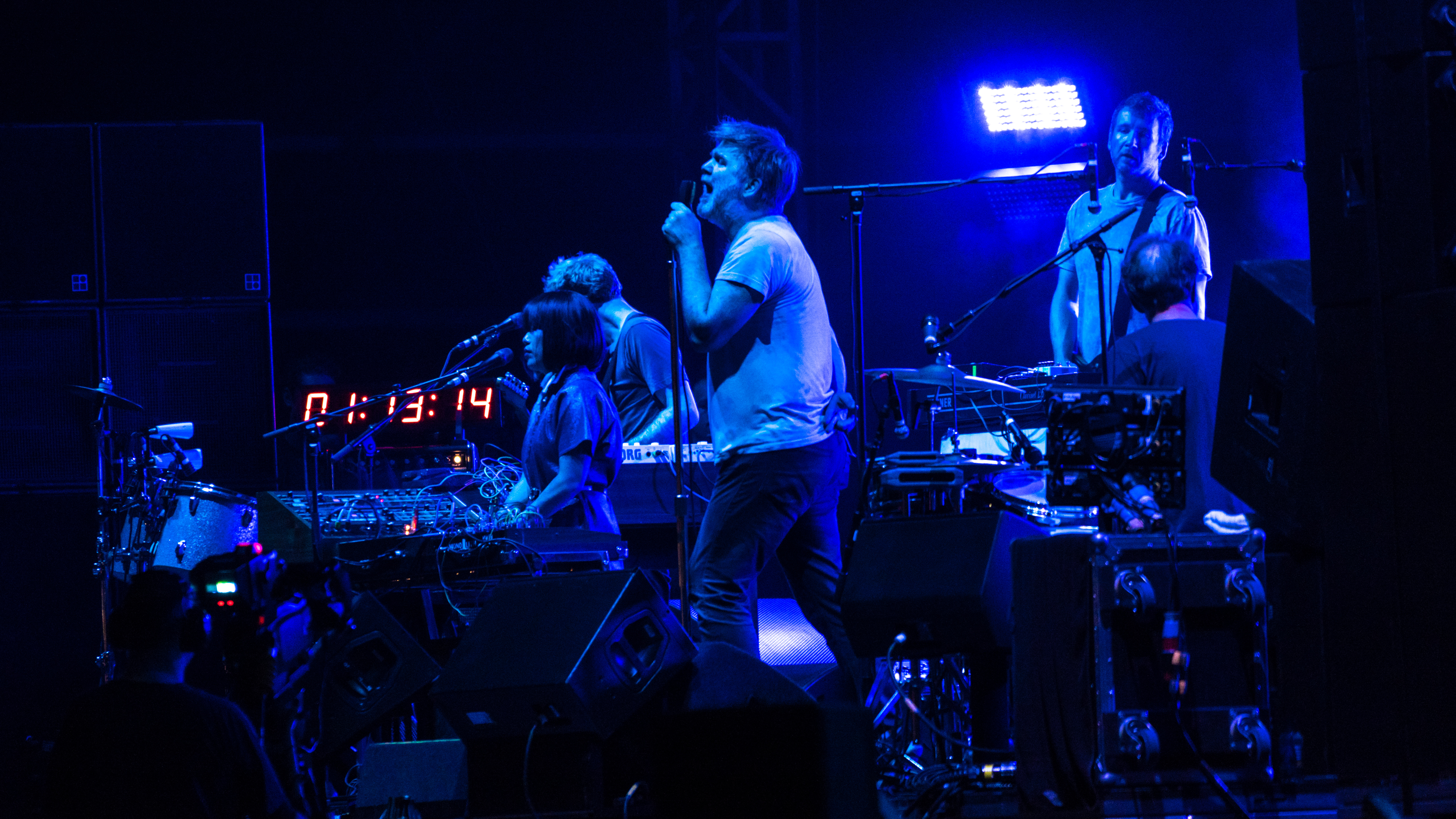
LCD Soundsystem at All Points East, England, in 2018

LCD Soundsystem performed their first show of 2017 at Brooklyn Steel on April 6, including several new songs. On May 5, they released the digital double A-side single "Call the Police" and "American Dream". They performed the songs on the May 6 episode of the 42nd season of Saturday Night Live.

LCD Soundsystem released their fifth album, American Dream, on September 1, 2017, through Columbia Records and DFA. It was nominated for Best Alternative Music Album, and "Tonite" won Best Dance Recording at the 2018 Grammy Awards, earning LCD Soundsystem their first Grammy win. They performed three songs at Electric Lady Studios as part of a Spotify Singles release, including a cover of the Chic song "I Want Your Love". On November 2, they released a cover of the Heaven 17 song "(We Don't Need This) Fascist Groove Thang". In late 2018, Whang and the synthesizer player Gavilán Rayna Russom performed a DJ tour as the Ladies of LCD Soundsystem. In February 2019, LCD Soundsystem released a live album, Electric Lady Sessions, recorded at Electric Lady Studios. They entered a hiatus later that year.

=== Holiday Special (2021–2022) ===
In 2021, Russom left LCD Soundsystem to focus on other projects. From November to December 2021, LCD Soundsystem played a 20-date residency at Brooklyn Steel, their first shows in three years. They canceled the final three dates and offered refunds due to an increase of COVID-19 cases in New York. The New York residencies became an annual tradition.

On December 22, Amazon Music broadcast The LCD Soundsystem Holiday Special on Amazon Prime Video and Twitch. It comprised a one-off episode of a 1990s-style sitcom, All My Friends, directed by Eric Wareheim, with comedians and actors portraying the band members, including Wareheim as Murphy, Macaulay Culkin as Mahoney and Christine Ko as Whang. It was followed by a prerecorded performance. Wareheim said that he and Murphy had been developing the sitcom for 15 years. The special was produced during November and December 2021; the band's performance was filmed in New York City with the sitcom episode filmed immediately afterward in Los Angeles, over a span of two days. Wareheim and Murphy expressed amazement at Amazon Music's willingness to air the special.

=== Singles and concert residencies (2022–present) ===
In 2022, LCD Soundsystem was the musical guest for the February 26 episode of Saturday Night Live's 47th season, hosted by John Mulaney. They performed "Thrills" and "Yr City's a Sucker" from their debut album, and appeared in a sketch as members of the Guardian Angels. In March, Murphy announced they would prioritize live shows without a new album for 2022. Murphy, Whang, Mahoney, and Pope reunited with the former member Phil Mossman as LCD Soundsystem at a DFA Records 20th anniversary show on March 26.

Throughout 2022, LCD Soundsystem played a series of concert residencies, beginning in March with four nights at Franklin Music Hall in Philadelphia, Pennsylvania, followed by four nights in April at the Roadrunner in Boston, Massachusetts, six at the O2 Academy in Brixton, London, eight at the Fox Oakland Theatre and Warfield Theatre in the San Francisco Bay Area, and 20 at Brooklyn Steel in November and December. They contributed "New Body Rhumba" to the soundtrack for Noah Baumbach's 2022 film White Noise, and released it as a single on September 30, their first release since American Dream.

LCD Soundsystem was one of the headline acts at the inaugural Re:SET Concert Series in June 2023. Murphy and Wang contributed backing vocals to the "Dancer" by Idles, released in October. In November and December, LCD Soundsystem embarked on the Tri Boro Tour of New York, playing four shows each at Brooklyn Steel, Terminal 5 and Knockdown Center. On 22 October, 2024, LCD Soundsystem released "X-Ray Eyes", their first release since "New Body Rhumba". That November, Murphy confirmed that LCD Soundsystem was recording a new album. They played a 12-day residency at the Knockdown Center, New York, in November and December 2024.

In June 2025, LCD Soundsystem played an eight-night residency at Brixton Academy, London, in June 2025, and released an edit of the This is Happening track "Home" by Tom Sharkett. In November and December 2025, they played 12 shows at the Knockdown Center. In 2026, they toured the US and Canada with the Brooklyn band Victoryland. Keith Wood, LCD Soundsystem's manager until 2012, died in April 2026 from ALS. LCD Soundsystem is scheduled to play 12 New York shows in November and December 2026. Their November 30 show will be the 100th of their New York residencies.

== Style ==
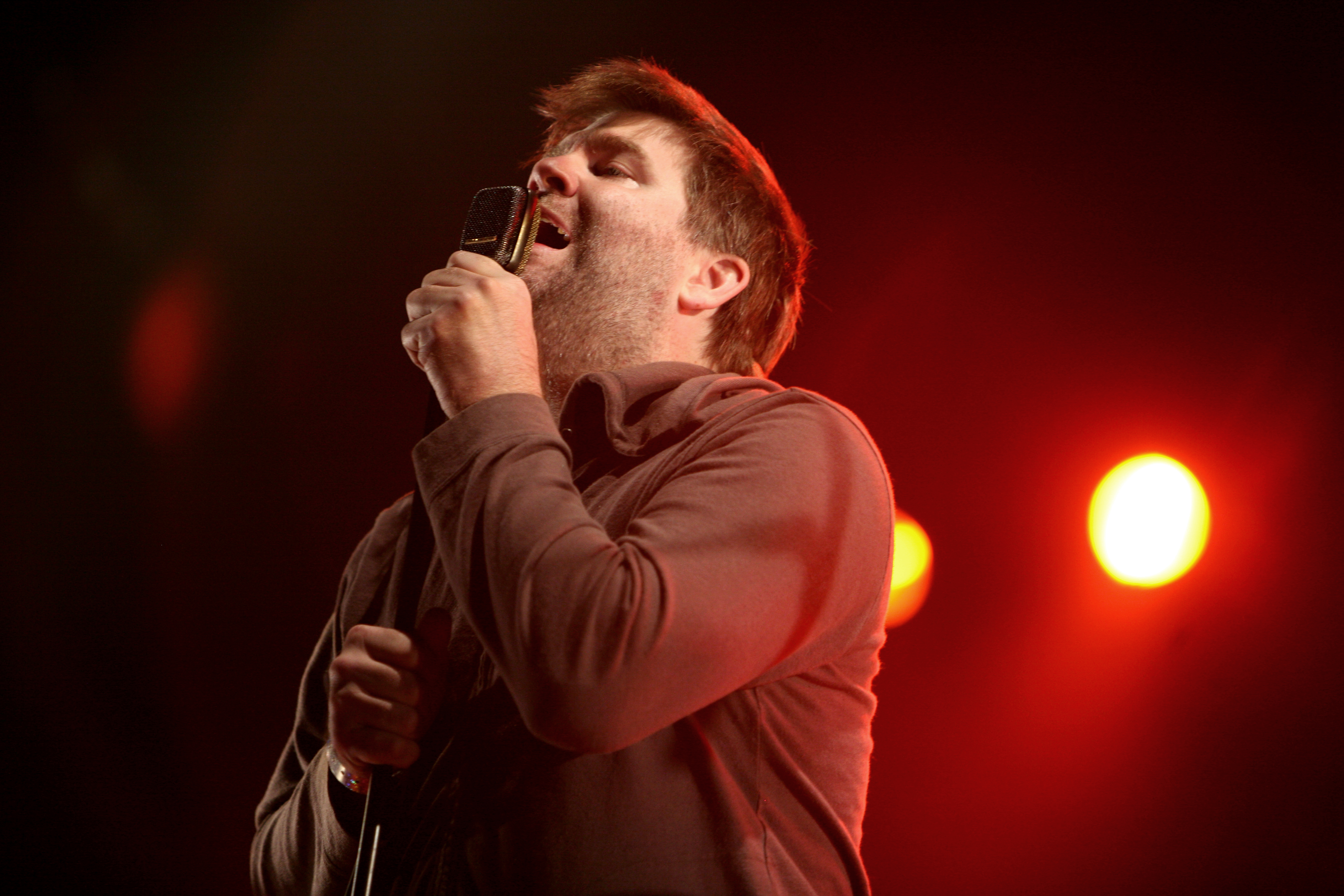
Murphy at La Route Du Rock in August 2007

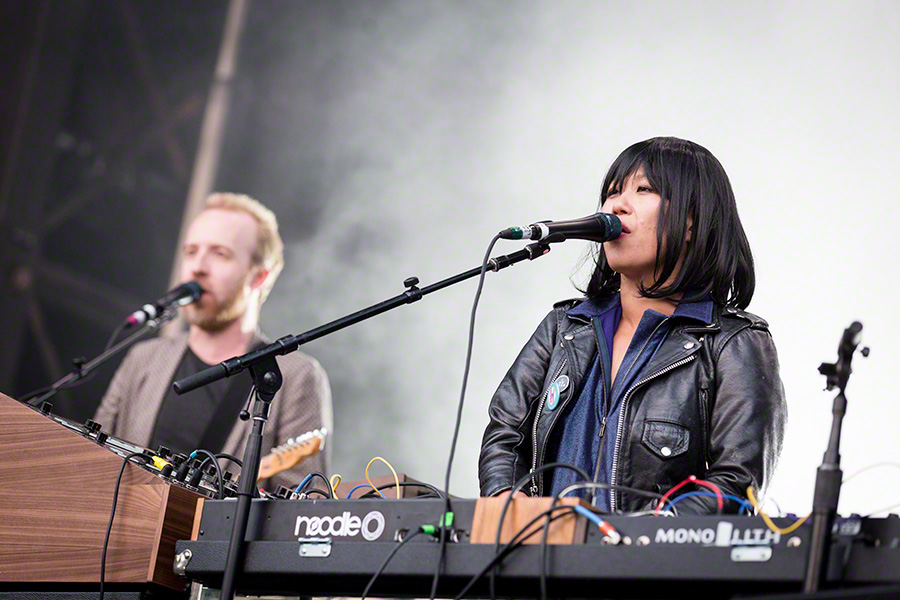
Al Doyle (left) and Nancy Whang in 2016

LCD Soundsystem combine dance, electronic and post-punk music. The journalist Mark Beaumont said they combine electronic music with the "post-punk DIY aesthetic" of the Strokes and the Yeah Yeah Yeahs, building connections between rock and electronic music throughout the 2000s as the Chemical Brothers and Primal Scream had in the 1990s in the UK. He described their music as "spare but explosive dance punk" and a "fusion of the experimental, the cultured and the knowingly cynical".

Amanda Petrusich described the first LCD Soundsystem album as "a collection of exacting, twitchy songs as indebted to electronic music as they were to indie-rock" and drew comparisons to 1970s and 1980s bands such as Talking Heads, Liquid Liquid and Can. Pitchfork identified influences of Gang of Four in the guitars, Mark E. Smith in the vocals and Liquid Liquid in the basslines. Murphy cited David Bowie and Brian Eno's collaborations in the 1970s (the Berlin Trilogy) as a major influence.

In the New Yorker, Hua Hsu wrote that LCD Soundsystem "tinkered with dance music's maximalist tendencies", mixing "huge, community-moving beats" with "introspective, almost twee lyrics". In the New York Times, Joe Coscarelli wrote that over their first three albums they had moved from "brash and bratty" on songs such as "Daft Punk Is Playing at My House" to "epic and sincere" on songs such as "All My Friends", "New York, I Love You but You're Bringing Me Down" and "Home".

Murphy's lyrics address themes of aging, love, and letting go. In the New Yorker, Amanda Petrusich wrote that they combine gloom with self-liberation, and express "devastating, fundamental anxieties: am I important? Do I mean anything to anyone?" In The Atlantic, Spencer Kornhaber wrote that Murphy observed culture and music with a mixture of irony and sincerity. The Guardian critic Alexis Petridis described his lyrics as acerbic.

Murphy described LCD Soundsystem as "a band about bands", and said it had positioned itself as "slightly superior and slightly scary — a snarky record-jerk band that could outsnark even the most curmudgeonly, hyper-knowledgeable record dork". Coscarelli wrote that LCD Soundsystem represented the New York hipster elite of the 2000s and was "purposefully pretentious".

== Equipment ==
LCD Soundsystem uses live instrumentation alongside electronic instruments. They use analog synthesizers including the Yamaha CS-60, Roland SH-101, Moog Taurus, Moog Rogue, Prophet-600, Roland Juno-60 and EMS VCS 3. They favor cheap guitars such as Squier and Epiphone. Murphy records using a 1957 Gretsch jazz drum kit; live, Mahoney augments his kit with Simmons drum pads and TR-33 and TR-808 drum machines. Murphy uses a distinctive Sennheiser MD 409 microphone for his vocals.

== Legacy ==
In Slate, Luke Winkie wrote that, at its height, LCD Soundsystem was "the most fashionable band in the world" and "the north star of hipsterdom". Kornhaber suggested that their 2011 Madison Square Garden show marked the end of the era in which the term "indie rock" had cultural significance, in terms of the generation of 2000s bands feted by the website Pitchfork.

By the time of their disbandment in 2011, LCD Soundsystem had become one of the most acclaimed and influential American bands. In 2013, Rolling Stone named it one of its "new immortals", acts they predicted would "stand the test of time". In 2021, Pitchfork named it one of the most important acts of the preceding 25 years. Sound of Silver has been named one of the greatest albums in history by NME, Uncut, and Rolling Stone. Spin named it one of the best albums of 1985–2014 and The Guardian named it one of the best albums of the 2000s. In 2019, The Guardian named it the fifth-best album of the 21st century so far.

== Awards and nominations ==
=== Grammy Awards ===
Year	Nominee / work	Award	Result
2006	"Daft Punk Is Playing at My House"	Best Dance Recording	Nominated
2006	LCD Soundsystem	Best Electronic/Dance Album	Nominated
2008	Sound of Silver	Best Electronic/Dance Album	Nominated
2018	"Tonite"	Best Dance Recording	Won
2018	American Dream	Best Alternative Music Album	Nominated

=== Rober Awards Music Poll ===
Year	Nominee / work	Award	Result
2007	"Someone Great"	Best Dance Anthem	Won
2008	James Murphy	Best Male Artist	Won
2010	"I Can Change"	Best Dance Anthem	Won
2010	Themselves	Best Electronica	Won
2017	Themselves	Best Group or Duo	Won
2017	Themselves	Comeback of the Year	Won
2017	Themselves	Best Live Artist	4th Place
2017	American Dream	Album of the Year	2nd place
2017	"American Dream"	Song of the Year	Won
2018	"(We Don't Need This) Fascist Groove Thang"	Best Cover Version	4th Place

=== Other ===
Year	Awards	Work	Category	Result
2005	MVPA Awards	"Daft Punk Is Playing at My House"	Best Electronic Video	Nominated
2007	Shortlist Music Prize	Sound of Silver	Album of the Year	Nominated
2007	Best Art Vinyl	Sound of Silver	Best Vinyl Art	Nominated
2008	MVPA Awards	"North American Scum"	Best Electronic Video	Nominated
2010	UK Music Video Awards	"Drunk Girls"	Best Indie/Alternative Video	Nominated
2011	New York Music Awards	Themselves	Band of the Year	Won
2011	New York Music Awards	This is Happening	Album of the Year	Won
2011	New York Music Awards	This is Happening	Best Pop/Electronic Album	Won
2011	New York Music Awards	"Drunk Girls"	Best Rock Video	Won
2011	International Dance Music Awards	"I Can Change"	Best Underground Dance Track	Nominated
2011	International Dance Music Awards	Themselves	Best Dance Artist (Group)	Nominated
2011	mtvU Woodie Awards	Themselves	Woodie of the Year	Nominated
2011	Webby Awards	Themselves	Artist of the Year	Won
2012	UK Music Video Awards	Shut Up and Play the Hits	Best Live Music Coverage	Won
2013	NME Awards	Shut Up and Play the Hits	Best Music Film	Nominated
2018	UK Music Video Awards	"Tonite"	Best Interactive Video	Nominated
2018	Brit Awards	Themselves	Best International Group	Nominated
2018	NME Awards	Themselves	Best Live Band	Nominated
2019	Classic Pop Reader Awards	"Oh Baby"	Video of the Year	Won
2019	Music Video Festival	"Oh Baby"	Best Music Video	Nominated

== Members ==
Sources are based on single and album credits.

Current members

- James Murphy – lead vocals, keyboards, synthesizers, guitar, bass, drums, percussion, drum machine, piano, organ, production (2002–2011, 2015–present)
- Nancy Whang – keyboards, synthesizers, vocals (2002–2011, 2015–present)
- Pat Mahoney – drums, percussion, drum machine, synthesizers, backing vocals (2002–2011, 2015–present)
- Tyler Pope – bass, guitar, synthesizers, drum machine (2004–2011, 2015–present)
- Al Doyle – guitar, percussion, synthesizers, bass, vocals (2015–present; 2005–2011 touring)
- Korey Richey – percussion, synthesizers, piano, backing vocals (2015–present)

Current touring musicians

- Abby Echiverri – synthesizers, guitar, percussion, backing vocals (2021–present)
- Nick Millhiser – synthesizers, percussion, backing vocals (2021–present)

Former members

- Phil Mossman – guitar, percussion (2004–2011, one-off performance 2022)
- Matt Thornley – guitar, percussion, piano, synthesizers, drum machine (2009–2011, 2015–2021; 2006–2009 touring)
- Gavilán Rayna Russom – synthesizers, percussion, backing vocals (2015–2021; 2008–2011 touring)

Former touring musicians

- Jerry Fuchs – drums, percussion (2005–2009; died 2009)
- J. D. Mark – guitar (2005–2009; died 2013)
- Phil Skarich – bass (2005–2009)
- David Scott Stone – guitar, percussion, synthesizers, vocals (2010–2011)

== Discography ==
- LCD Soundsystem (2005)
- 45:33: Nike+ Original Run (2006)
- Sound of Silver (2007)
- This Is Happening (2010)
- American Dream (2017)

== See also ==
- Despacio (audio)
