= Nancy Whang =

American musician and vocalist

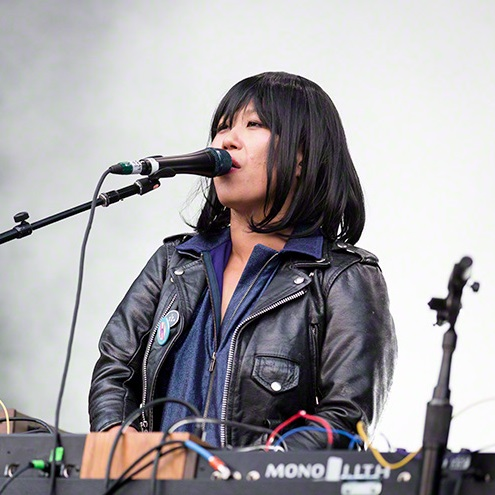
- Nancy Whang performing in 2016

Background information
- Origin: Beaverton, Oregon, U.S.
- Occupations: Musician; singer; keyboardist; DJ
- Years active: early 2000s–present

Nancy Whang is an American musician, singer, keyboardist and DJ, best known as a long-time member of the dance-punk band LCD Soundsystem and the electronic duo The Juan MacLean. She has been described as a founding member of LCD Soundsystem and a key figure in the early years of DFA Records, contributing synthesizers, keyboards and vocals to the label's flagship acts and touring line-ups. Outside her band work she has released solo recordings, fronted The Juan MacLean's album In a Dream, and appeared as a featured or backing vocalist on tracks by artists including Soulwax, Munk, Holy Ghost!, Classixx and Idles, while touring internationally as a DJ.

== Career ==
=== Early life and move to New York ===
Whang grew up in the Portland suburb of Beaverton, Oregon. She has described it as a fairly nondescript suburban town where she learned piano as a child and was made to take violin lessons. She left Beaverton for New York City as soon as she graduated high school, drawn by a desire to move as far away from home as possible and become part of the city's music and art scenes. Before playing in bands herself she worked at an artist's studio in New York and became a regular at punk and indie rock shows.

Whang has said she had no intention of pursuing a career in music and did not start making music until she moved to New York, where she continued to see herself primarily as a fan and participant in the scene. She met LCD Soundsystem leader James Murphy at a downtown party in the late 1990s through mutual friends, and the two became close as they continued to run into each other around the city. When Murphy put together a live band for LCD Soundsystem, he invited Whang to join on keyboards because she knew her way around a piano and because he wanted a group that "wasn't entirely made up of dudes".

=== LCD Soundsystem ===
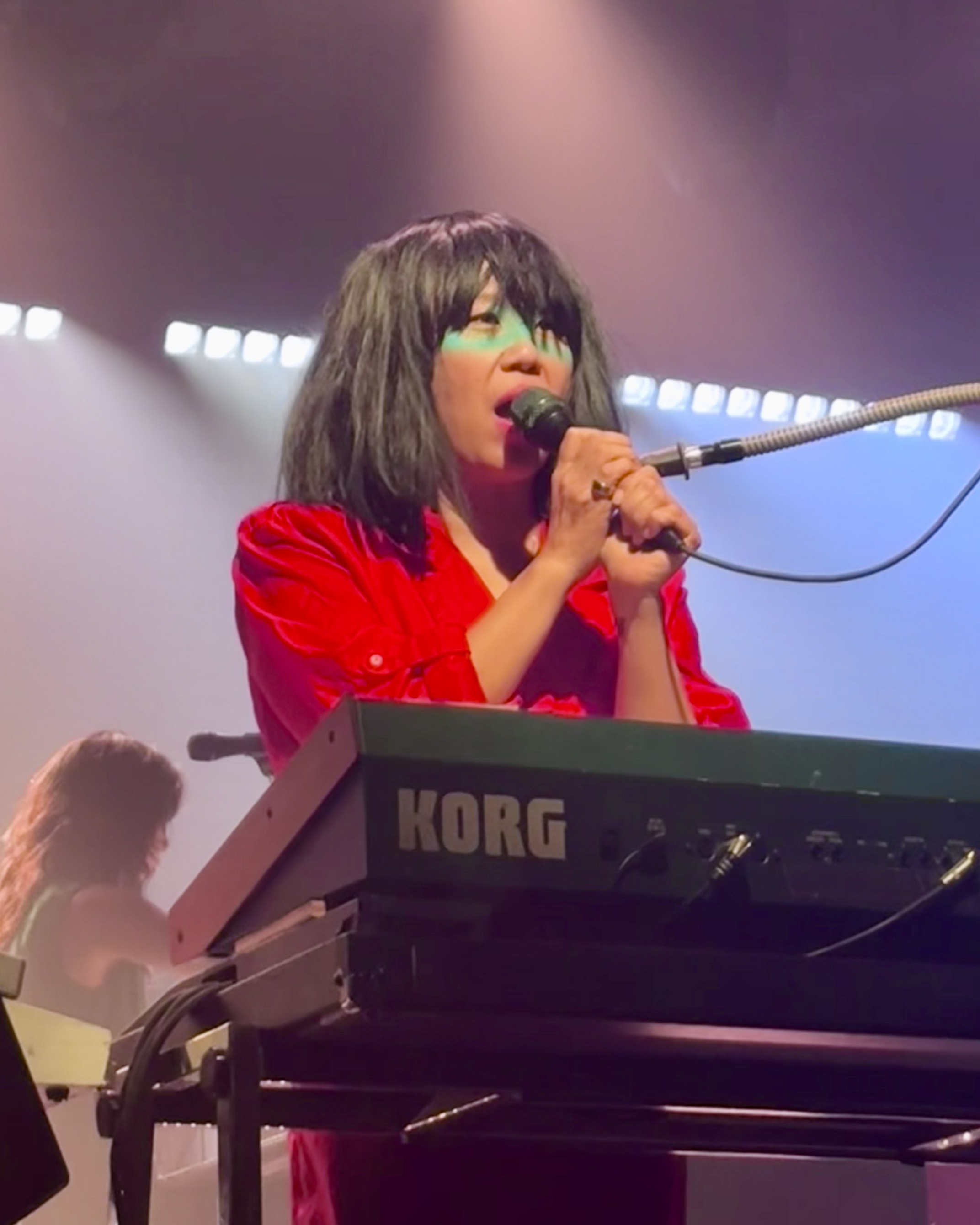
Whang performing with LCD Soundsystem at Knockdown Center in 2025

Writers and interviewers have described Whang as one of the founding members of LCD Soundsystem and an essential part of the band's sound as it emerged from the offices of DFA Records in New York. In addition to performing as the band's synthesizer and keyboard player, she is also a vocalist alongside Murphy and other members.

As part of LCD Soundsystem, Whang has toured extensively and performed at major venues and festivals, including the band's farewell and reunion shows at Madison Square Garden and appearances on Saturday Night Live.

=== The Juan MacLean ===
Whang has been closely associated with The Juan MacLean, the DFA-affiliated project led by John MacLean, since its early releases, sharing vocal duties and performing as a core member of the live and studio line-ups.

== Personal life ==
Whang is Korean American. She has spoken about growing up as one of the few non-white people in her Beaverton community. She has noted that interviewers frequently ask her about being an Asian-American woman and the only woman in predominantly male groups, though she tends to think of herself simply as another member of the group rather than focusing on that aspect of her identity.
