= James Murphy (electronic musician) =

American musician (born 1970)

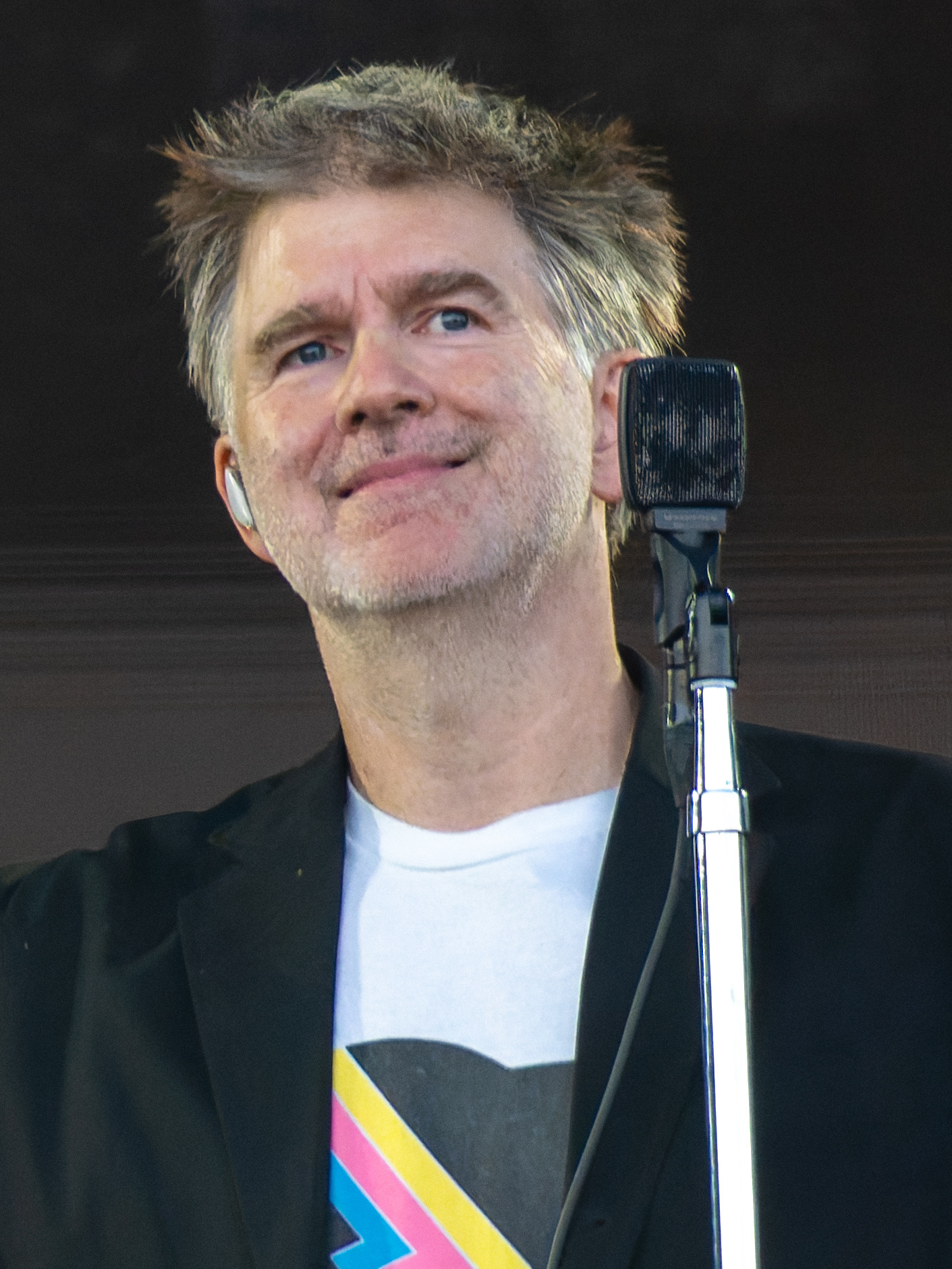
- Murphy in 2024

Background information
- Born: James Jeremiah Murphy; February 4, 1970 (age 56); Princeton Junction, New Jersey, U.S.
- Origin: New York City, New York
- Genres: Dance-punk; electronica; post-punk revival; alternative dance; indie rock
- Occupations: Musician; DJ; singer; songwriter; record producer
- Instruments: Vocals; bass guitar; drums; percussion; guitar; keyboards; piano
- Works: LCD Soundsystem discography
- Years active: 1988–present
- Label: DFA
- Member of: LCD Soundsystem
- Formerly of: Falling Man; Pony; Speedking
- Spouse: Christina Topsoe (m. 2004)

James Jeremiah Murphy (born February 4, 1970) is an American musician, DJ, singer, songwriter, and record producer. His most well-known musical project is LCD Soundsystem, which first gained attention with its single "Losing My Edge" in 2002 before releasing its eponymous debut album in February 2005 to critical acclaim and top 20 success in the UK. LCD Soundsystem's second and third studio albums, Sound of Silver (2007) and This Is Happening (2010) respectively, were praised by several music review outlets.

LCD Soundsystem was named one of Rolling Stone's New Immortals—"currently active (or relatively recently defunct) artists who [the publication thinks] will stand the test of time." In 2011, LCD Soundsystem announced they would disband with a final show on April 2, 2011 at Madison Square Garden. In the following years, Murphy continued to pursue other artistic projects – some music-related, others not. In early 2016, the band announced a reunion as well as an appearance at the 2016 Coachella Festival, with their fourth album American Dream and respective tour following afterwards in 2017. In May 2018 and in August 2024, LCD Soundsystem was a headliner at All Points East festival in Victoria Park, London.

== Early projects and influences ==
Murphy was born and grew up in Princeton Junction, New Jersey, and graduated from West Windsor-Plainsboro High School in 1988. He is of Irish descent through both his parents.

In discussing some of his influences and favorite music with Rolling Stone, Murphy cited the B-52's, the Fall, Yes, David Bowie and Can. He has also named OMD, Bronski Beat and the Smiths as childhood favorites. Murphy was a member of Falling Man from 1988 to 1989, Pony from 1992 to 1994, and Speedking from 1995 to 1997. He was also the sound engineer for Sub Pop band Six Finger Satellite.

Murphy attended New York University, where he was an English major but later dropped out. At age 22, Murphy was offered a job writing for the sitcom Seinfeld. He did not expect the show to be successful and chose to continue with music instead.

=== DFA Records ===
In the late 1980s, Murphy picked the name Death from Above after seeing a helicopter emblazoned with the slogan in the film Apocalypse Now. He has used this name for various projects over the years including as nickname for a signature PA set developed for Six Finger Satellite during the mid-90s. In 2000 Murphy engineered Northern Irish DJ David Holmes' album Bow Down to the Exit Sign and was introduced to the record's co-producer, Tim Goldsworthy (formerly of UNKLE). Goldsworthy and Murphy would DJ together on the Lower East Side, doing so with diverse genres of music. They went on to found DFA Records with Jonathan Galkin in 2001. The name "Death from Above" led to a dispute with a two-man Canadian band also using the same name. In response to a legal threat, the Canadian group changed their name to Death from Above 1979, paying ode to the 1996 Smashing Pumpkins song of the same name.

Under the DFA name, Murphy and Goldsworthy would notably produce every track on the Rapture's debut album Echoes, including the lead single "House of Jealous Lovers", a track that sold over 20,000 copies on 12-inch vinyl.

== LCD Soundsystem ==
=== LCD Soundsystem ===
In 2002, Murphy started the electronic dance-punk band LCD Soundsystem, releasing a string of singles through DFA Records. The most successful of these initial singles was "Losing My Edge", which peaked at number 117 in the UK. The band released its self-titled debut album in 2005 to critical acclaim. A double album, a second disc featured all of the band's previously sold out vinyl singles and B-sides, including "Yeah" and "Yr City's a Sucker".

=== Sound of Silver ===
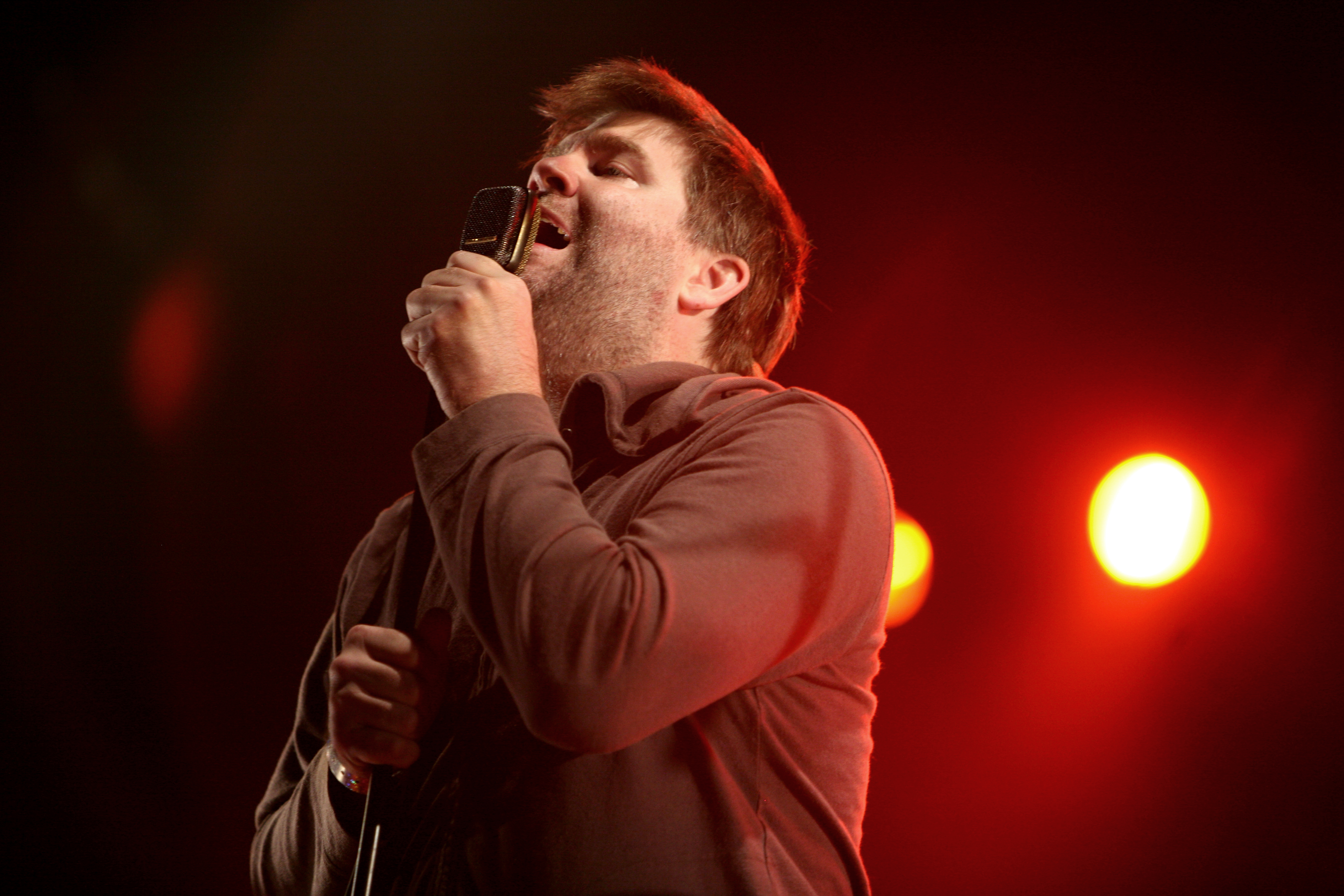
Murphy at Route Du Rock in August 2007.

Murphy's second LCD Soundsystem album, entitled Sound of Silver, was released on March 12, 2007. In its aftermath, he quipped to Mojo: "You don't have to work very hard to write an article about us ... Just use the words 'unlikely frontman', 'bear-like', 'unshaven', 'Talking Heads', blah blah blah".

In October 2009, Pitchfork Media named the track "All My Friends" off Sound of Silver, the second best song of the decade, and a week later, the album was ranked at #17 in the "Top 200 Albums of the 2000s" list. He also has a CD in the Fabriclive CD series, Fabric Live 36, made in collaboration with LCD Soundsystem drummer Pat Mahoney, released in October 2007. In late 2008, Murphy announced he would play bass guitar in Free Energy, a classic rock band, with LCD Soundsystem drummer Pat Mahoney and friends Scott Wells and Paul Sprangers, although this was later refuted by Murphy as a misinterpretation.

=== This Is Happening and disbandment ===
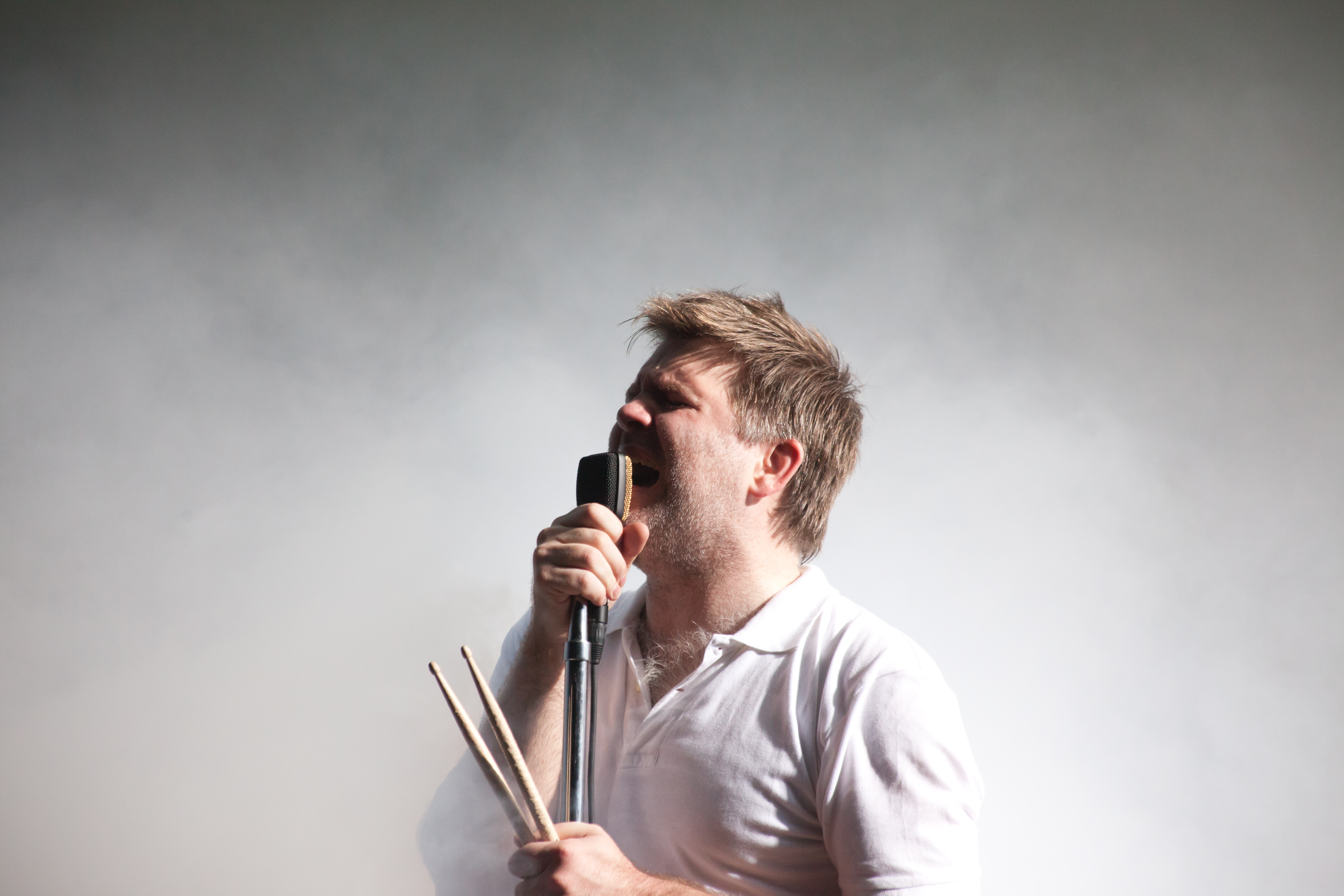
Murphy at Berlin Festival 2010.

In late 2009, Murphy moved into film scoring, writing music for Noah Baumbach's film Greenberg. The soundtrack was released on March 22, 2010. LCD Soundsystem's third album This Is Happening was released on May 17, 2010, in the UK and May 18 in the US. The album was recorded over the course of 2009 and early 2010 in the Mansion. In April, they released the single "Drunk Girls" with an accompanying music video directed by Spike Jonze. The album is dedicated to Jerry Fuchs (1974–2009), who had performed drums live with the band on occasion as well as having a big part with other associated DFA acts.

Murphy announced his retirement from LCD Soundsystem with the release of This Is Happening, and made his last television appearance under that name on February 14, 2011, on The Colbert Report. His last concert at Madison Square Garden was simulcast streaming on Pitchfork Media's website on April 2, 2011.

In July 2012, Shut Up and Play the Hits, a documentary film about Murphy and LCD Soundsystem's final concert, received a limited theatrical release in the US and subsequently in UK cinemas and on Blu-ray and DVD. The film follows Murphy over a 48-hour period, from the day of the band's final gig at Madison Square Garden to the morning after the show. The film also features intermittent segments from an extended interview between Murphy and pop culture writer Chuck Klosterman.

=== Shut Up and Play the Hits and The Long Goodbye ===
LCD Soundsystem played their last show until 2016 on April 2, 2011, at Madison Square Garden. Both a documentary and a complete recording of the show were made. Shut Up and Play the Hits, directed by Will Lovelace and Dylan Southern, documents the highlights of the show and Murphy's actions after it. 11 cinematographers captured the entire near four-hour show from different angles in addition to three roof cameras. The concert footage is interwoven with scenes from Murphy's personal life, including an interview with writer Chuck Klosterman. The documentary screened at select theaters around the US for a limited time in 2012, and was later released in a DVD and Blu-ray form by Oscilloscope on October 9, 2012. The physical form consisted of three discs that contained the documentary and footage of the entire concert.

The Long Goodbye is an audio capture of LCD Soundsystem's show at Madison Square Garden. Murphy mixed the audio, which was different from its video counterpart "because the film is mixed for your eye and the record is mixed for your ears." Murphy has stated that the work into mixing the audio had been strenuous and "just murder". The Long Goodbye was released as a vinyl box set on record store day, April 19, 2014. It was later released on vinyl and digitally.

=== Reunion and American Dream (2015–present) ===
In October 2015, over 5 years after the band's third album, Consequence of Sound reported that "multiple sources" confirmed LCD Soundsystem's reunion in 2016 by headlining multiple "high-profile music festivals in the US and UK". The report was also confirmed by Billboard the same day, but quickly after these rumors, DFA Records label manager Kris Petersen denied the reunion of the band, with DFA co-founder Jonathan Galkin seconding the denial in a Pitchfork article.

However, on December 24, 2015, the band contradicted these denials by releasing a new single, "Christmas Will Break Your Heart". After the new single, on January 4, 2016, LCD Soundsystem confirmed that they would be headlining the 2016 Coachella Festival. On January 5, 2016, Murphy confirmed a new studio album, called American Dream, would be released in 2016, and that the band would make additional appearances. Murphy credits David Bowie for helping convince him to reunite LCD Soundsystem.

On May 4, 2017, Murphy announced two new LCD Soundsystem singles entitled "Call the Police" and "American Dream" were to be released at midnight, coinciding with their performance on Saturday Night Live. He also said that the album was nearing completion. American Dream was released on September 1, 2017, through DFA Records and Columbia Records.

== Other projects ==
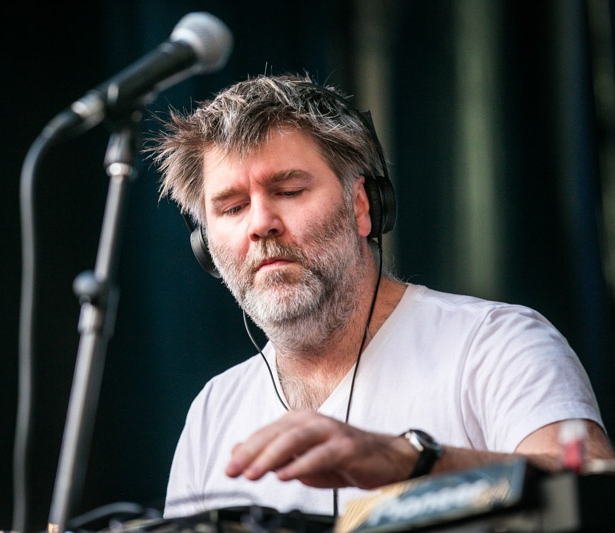
Murphy DJing at the 2013 CBGB Festival

After the disbandment of LCD Soundsystem (between 2011 and 2015), Murphy pursued other artistic projects including remixing, producing, directing, and even developing his own espresso. Murphy stated that dissolving LCD Soundsystem made it possible for him to experiment with other projects: "So [these projects] [become] possible, which is incredible. I get to do all this crazy shit – and if I ever [want] to be in a band again, I can probably figure that out." He also noted how much time the creation of an album takes and that time can be spent doing other activities: "I wouldn't have a record coming out in April if I had done all [these projects]. It's impossible. And if I had a record coming out in April, I would have been fucking invisible for two years."

=== Britney Spears ===
In 2003, Murphy worked with the pop singer Britney Spears on her album In the Zone, but the collaboration was unsuccessful. According to Murphy, "It was very strange – we were both lying on the floor, head-to head, working on lyrics in a notepad. She seemed eager to please, but it went nowhere. She went to dinner and just never came back." A track from their collaboration was leaked online in 2006.

=== Reflektor ===
Murphy worked on Arcade Fire's fourth studio album Reflektor. A Win Butler interview conducted by Rolling Stone revealed that he thought of LCD Soundsystem "like New Order and the B-52's". He continued to state that Arcade Fire are influenced by bands that have also influenced LCD Soundsystem. A collaboration between Arcade Fire and Murphy had been intended since Arcade Fire's album Neon Bible, however time conflicts prevented such a collaboration. Though Murphy regularly stated in interviews that he "didn't do that much" to help Arcade Fire, he has said that he worked the most extensively on the song "Awful Sound (Oh Eurydice)".

=== Despacio ===
Together with David and Stephen Dewaele of 2ManyDjs, and engineer John Klett, Murphy designed Despacio: a formation of eight McIntosh speakers stacked to eleven feet. The idea for the system came from Murphy and the Dewaele brother's dissatisfaction with the evolution of DJ culture and how DJing has become more of a "show-spectacle-type scenario" and has departed from the days of people dancing in the dark with little attention to the DJ. The system is "designed for really immersive listening". The reason behind creating and performing with Despacio is to encourage DJs to implement a similar sound system, altering the course of DJ culture to its dance roots.

=== Subway Symphony ===
Murphy had attempted to change the sound of the New York turnstile beeps since 1999. Murphy described the turnstile sound as of 2014 as a "dissonant rubbing-Styrofoam-on-glass squeak" that is "horrible". Because the Metropolitan Transit Authority planned to update the system by 2019, Murphy proposed his turnstile plan that would have each turnstile harmonize with others by emitting three-to-five note sequences. Installing new sound chips will be an easier task during the renovations. Murphy claimed that the more pleasant sounds would also help people's attitudes toward taking the subway. He said people will "feel a nostalgia" for certain destinations when hearing its unique melody.

In June 2015, he partnered with Heineken to launch the project, branded as the "Subway Symphony". However, the MTA denied any possibility of the project happening, as the standard turnstile beep is a necessary ADA-compliant tool for the visually impaired.

=== David Bowie ===
Murphy first worked professionally with David Bowie as an executive producer for Reflektor, with Bowie performing additional backing vocals on the album's title track.

On November 5, 2013, Columbia Records released The Next Day Extra, a three-disc expanded edition of David Bowie's 2013 album The Next Day. On the expanded edition, Murphy contributed a remix of the track "Love Is Lost" into a 10 minute version entitled "Love is Lost (Hello Steve Reich Mix)", heavily utilizing an interpolation of Reich's composition Clapping Music. When Murphy was offered to remix the track, he had not remixed a song in five years. He said "it would have been scary if it was a remix for somebody I had never even heard of, but it was super scary to do that [for Bowie]".

Murphy made a guest appearance on Bowie's final album Blackstar as a percussionist. He was originally slated to be a third producer of the album alongside Bowie and Tony Visconti, but exited the project due to schedule conflicts.

The song "Black Screen" from American Dream is rumoured to discuss Bowie's death and its effect on Murphy.

=== "Little Duck" ===
Murphy participated in Canon's Project Imaginat10n, which called for five celebrities to direct short films based on pictures uploaded by people around the world to the Project Imaginat10n site. The result was "Little Duck", Murphy's first directorial effort. Ron Howard advised Murphy in his directing. Shooting took place in Japan, the setting of the film. The film follows a young man who travels from Manhattan to Japan in order to help solve his brothers' problems.

=== House of Good ===
In collaboration with coffee company Blue Bottle, Murphy created his signature coffee called House of Good. It was developed with help of Blue Bottle founder James Freeman.

=== Other projects ===
Murphy recorded a song with Gorillaz and OutKast's Andre 3000, called "DoYaThing", for their Converse collection. It was released on February 23, 2012. He produced a song with Pulp called "After You". It was released as a present on Christmas Day 2012 to fans. Murphy also appeared in The Comedy with Tim Heidecker and Eric Wareheim. Murphy was listed as a producer for Yeah Yeah Yeahs' 2013 album, Mosquito.

Collaborating with IBM, Murphy "remixed" the 2014 US Open matches. Murphy composed an algorithm that generated pieces from the sounds and occurrences, such as fault, point and ace for example, of the actual matches. Murphy cut moments from the pieces and created 14 remixes from them. The remixes were created in real time during the matches on US Open's website. The pieces are titled by their match number and are viewable on the website with visual accompaniment denoting points scored. The website categorizes the pieces by men's matches, women's matches and Murphy's 14 remixes.

Murphy and fellow LCD Soundsystem bandmember Nancy Whang collaborated with Idles on the song "Dancer", released in 2023. He recorded and sang two tracks for the album Los Angeles by Lol Tolhurst, Budgie and Jacknife Lee. He features on the title track, which was released as the lead single in late July 2023, and on "Skins", the closing track of the album.

== Discography ==
=== With LCD Soundsystem ===
- LCD Soundsystem (2005)
- Sound of Silver (2007)
- This Is Happening (2010)
- American Dream (2017)

=== With Falling Man ===
- A Christening (1988)

=== With Pony ===
- Cosmovalidator (1994)

=== With Speedking ===
- The Fist and the Laurels (2002)

=== Solo ===
- "DoYaThing" (with Gorillaz and André 3000) (2012)
- Remixes Made with Tennis Data (2014)
- While We're Young (soundtrack) (2015)

== Personal life ==
Murphy is married to Danish-born Christina Topsoe. They have a son who was born in 2015

In June 2015, Murphy opened a wine bar named The Four Horsemen in Williamsburg, Brooklyn.
