= Electric Lady Sessions =

Live album by LCD Soundsystem
- Released: February 8, 2019
- Recorded: January 19–21, 2018
- Studio: Electric Lady (New York City)
- Genre: Dance-punk; new wave; alternative dance; post-punk; synth-pop
- Length: 68:15
- Label: DFA; Columbia
- Producer: James Murphy

LCD Soundsystem chronology
American Dream (2017)	Electric Lady Sessions (2019)

Singles from Electric Lady Sessions
- 1. "Tonite" / "Home" / "I Want Your Love" Released: September 12, 2018; 2. "(We Don't Need This) Fascist Groove Thang" Released: November 2, 2018

Professional ratings
Aggregate scores
Source	Rating
Metacritic	84/100
Review scores
Source	Rating
AllMusic	4/5 stars
Consequence of Sound	B+
Drowned in Sound	8/10
Exclaim!	8/10
Pitchfork	7.9/10

Electric Lady Sessions is a live in-studio album by American rock band LCD Soundsystem. It was released on February 8, 2019, through DFA and Columbia Records. It was recorded over a three-day span at Electric Lady Studios in Manhattan, New York, during their American Dream Tour. The session featured a twelve-song setlist that included covers of songs by Heaven 17, Chic, and the Human League.

== Promotion and release ==
Prior to any announcement of the album's release, the band had a Spotify Singles release on September 12, 2018, featuring live performances of their American Dream song "Tonite", their This Is Happening song "Home", and a cover of Chic's 1978 song "I Want Your Love", which had been in the band's live setlist rotation during their tour. Following the release, band member Al Doyle revealed on Twitter that the band performed a session at Electric Lady Studios and that there would be more music from the session, including covers, released in the future. On November 2, the band released a cover of Heaven 17's 1981 song "(We Don't Need This) Fascist Groove Thang" along with a confirmation that they would be releasing a live album, titled Electric Lady Sessions, at some point in the future. The band revealed the album's details and made it available for pre-order on January 11, 2019.

Electric Lady Sessions was released on February 8, 2019, through DFA Records and Columbia Records. It was made available on digital platforms and on vinyl. The vinyl release features two 180-gram 12-inch vinyl records housed in a gatefold package.

== Track listing ==
Electric Lady Sessions
No.	Title	Writer(s)	Length
1.	"Seconds" (The Human League cover)	Jo Callis; Philip Oakey; Philip Adrian Wright; Sally Christine Woodall	5:09
2.	"American Dream"	James Murphy	6:03
3.	"You Wanted a Hit"	Murphy; Al Doyle	7:54
4.	"Get Innocuous!"	Murphy; Tyler Pope	6:17
5.	"Call the Police"	Murphy; Doyle	6:40
6.	"I Used To"	Murphy; Doyle	4:39
7.	"Tonite"	Murphy; Doyle	5:44
8.	"Home"	Murphy	6:03
9.	"I Want Your Love" (Chic cover)	Bernard Edwards; Nile Rodgers	4:16
10.	"Emotional Haircut"	Murphy; Doyle; Pat Mahoney; Gavilán Rayna Russom	5:15
11.	"Oh Baby"	Murphy	6:10
12.	"(We Don't Need This) Fascist Groove Thang" (Heaven 17 cover)	Ian Craig Marsh; Martyn Ware; Glenn Gregory	4:05
Total length:			68:15

== Personnel ==
Personnel adapted from Tidal and album liner notes.

LCD Soundsystem

- James Murphy – lead vocals (tracks 1–8, 10 and 11), backing vocals (tracks 9 and 12), piano (track 9), bells (tracks 4 and 8), cowbell (tracks 4 and 12), timpani (track 4), guitar (track 12), synthesizer
- Pat Mahoney – drums (all tracks), backing vocals (tracks 3, 4, 7, 8, 10 and 12)
- Al Doyle – backing vocals (tracks 3-5, 7, 8, 10 and 12), lead vocals (track 1), guitar (tracks 3–10), percussion, synthesizers (1, 2, 11 and 12), electric piano
- Nancy Whang – backing vocals (tracks 3, 5, 7, 8 and 10), lead vocals (tracks 4, 9 and 12), piano (track 4), synthesizer (tracks 2, 3, 5–8, 10 and 11)
- Gavilán Rayna Russom – backing vocals (3, 7, 10 and 12), lead vocals (track 9), synthesizers (all tracks), percussion
- Tyler Pope – bass guitars (tracks 1–3, 5, 6, 8–10 and 12), bass synthesizers (tracks 4, 7 and 11)
- Matt Thornley – synthesizers (tracks 7 and 11), guitars (tracks 3 and 5), glockenspiel (track 2), cowbell (tracks 7 and 9), bells (tracks 8 and 9), MPC
- Korey Richey – tambourine (track 9), drums (track 10), piano (tracks 3, 5, 6 and 10), synthesizers (track 2), glockenspiel (track 11), backing vocals (tracks 3–5, 7, 8, 10 and 12)

Technical personnel

- James Murphy – production, recording, mixing
- Beatriz Artola – recording
- Korey Richey – recording, photography
- Gosha Usov – recording assistance
- Bob Weston – mastering

== Charts ==
Chart (2019)	Peak position
Belgian Albums (Ultratop Wallonia)	146
Scottish Albums (OCC)	36
US Indie Store Album Sales (Billboard)	11
US Vinyl Albums (Billboard)	23

== Release history ==
Region	Date	Format	Label	Catalog number
Various	February 8, 2019	12-inch vinyl	DFA; Columbia	C-216887
Various	February 8, 2019	Download; streaming	DFA; Columbia	—
