= Crime Cutz =

EP by Holy Ghost!
- Released: April 29, 2016
- Genre: Nu-disco
- Length: 21:47
- Label: DFA
- Producer: Holy Ghost!

Holy Ghost! chronology
Work For Hire (2015)	Crime Cutz (2016)	Work (2019)

Singles from Crime Cutz
- 1. "Crime Cutz" Released: February 4, 2016

Crime Cutz is the second EP by American synth-pop duo Holy Ghost!, released on April 29, 2016, through DFA Records. Its title came from the name of a person of the same name who offered a drum break for the title track that was not included in the final mix. Containing a 1980s-style atmosphere and noted by one reviewer to be the duo's cleanest sounding release so far, the extended play was influenced by Russian disco records Frankel found on eBay. DFA released the title track as a single in February 2016 to promote the EP's release. The EP went on to receive positive reviews from music critics.

== Production and composition ==
Crime Cutz has been described by Lily Moayeri of Under the Radar as an EP that strongly showcases the nu-disco side of the duo. The music of the EP was influenced by records by Russian jazz musicians that were released in the 1970s and 1980s but were never distributed in the duo's home country; these musicians attempted to copy the disco style of American and French acts such as Chic. Frankel, who was sent mp3 files of these tracks by a Russian record dealer on eBay, said that their failure to mimic the style of the popular songs they wanted to recreate due to their different synthesizer sounds is what made the songs unique: "I guess that's kind of what Nick and I do ... We find a sound we like, try to make it and fail, but in the process we make something new." The rhythm of each track was developed first before writing the melodies and lyrics, given that the main goal of the EP was for it to be "instantly rhythmically gratifying", as member Nick Millhiser described. In addition to its disco element, Crime Cutz features exaggerated arrangements and childlike R&B vocals that gives it a 1980s-esque atmosphere. Consequence of Sound's David Sackllah noted Crime Cutz to be Holy Ghost!'s cleanest-sounding release to date. As for the lyrical content, Frankel wanted the songs' seductive lyrics to be "phonetically fun" as with most other disco records.

== Songs ==
The starting title track of Crime Cutz derived its title from a person of the same name who gave Holy Ghost! a drum break to be used in the song; it was not included in the final mix, however. It begins with "spacey" synthesizers, before the acoustic drum beat kicks in around a minute into the song. Halfway into the song, diva vocals from the East Coast Inspirational Singers group join in, which Frankel, "literally found them on the internet. We met up the next day, and it was awesome and really moving to hear them sing. In general we've tried to be a bit more off the cuff when recording recently, [and they were] a last minute addition while mixing the song." Sequenced synth arpeggios, "super-dry" guitars, and falsetto lead vocals are also present in the arrangement.

"Stereotype" is about the band's self-awareness and pride towards them being of a very well-known musical genre, singing in a mournful tone that "I know I'm a stereotype, don't be so critical […] Let go." In the track's first draft, the drum parts and chord progression were developed first. Holy Ghost! traveled to Los Angeles to work with DJ and production duo Oliver on the song, but with little success in making the type of track Holy Ghost! wanted it to be. It was not until Oliver created a bassline for the duo that Holy Ghost! reworked the arrangement of the song into what would be the final mix that ended up on Crime Cutz.

The title of "Compass Point", a song Frankel wrote in 45 minutes, is a reference to Chris Blackwell's Compass Point Studios, where numerous popular musicians in the style mixture of funk, reggae and synthpop, that Crime Cutz pays a tribute to, recorded their music. Its working title was "Back to Earth", and was the first song to be written for but was not included on their second studio album Dynamics. As Millhiser explains, "There was always some indescribable thing about it that irked us, so we went back to that song with the intention of being like, 'Oh, you know, it’s just a matter of re-recording the vocals or the piano, and it’ll be done.' That of course was not the case, and we ended basically just keeping the drums and one line from the song, making a totally different song out of it, essentially remixing ourselves."

Frankel called the EP's closer, "Footsteps", to be the least rhythmic of all the tracks. Its original title was "Your Favorite Band/Footsteps". As Frankel described coming up with the name, "I was going the other night to see our friends in Hot Chip. When I was there, I overheard some people saying, 'I thought they were playing, but they’re DJing,' and that’s something that happens all the time now. People go to see their favorite band, and it turns out it’s a DJ set. I thought it was kind of funny, and also kind of sad — but in a funny way." While the version of Crime Cutz that was officially released only consists of four tracks, Holy Ghost! said in their January 2016 announcement of the EP that a fifth track might be included; "We’re still messing around, because we have a lot of demos from this last year and a half, and we’re sifting through, figuring out if there’s one more we want to finish."

== Release and promotion ==
Holy Ghost! first announced in a January 7, 2016, interview with The Boston Globe that an extended play titled Crime Cutz was to be released in late spring of that year. The title track of Crime Cutz first premiered worldwide on Zane Lowe's Apple Music show Beats 1 on February 4, 2016. The label DFA Records released it as a digital download single a day later. As part of the PopMatters feature Singles Going Steady, multiple writers reviewed the track upon its release. The 12-inch vinyl single for the song that also includes the instrumental version of the song was a 300-copy limited edition. An official Ben Fries-directed video for the song depicted multicolored lights flashing to the beat, with Aubrey Cook starring as the dancer. On April 22, 2016, DFA released a "Crime Cutz" remix EP featuring two re-cuts of the song, one by Alan Palomo's project Neon Indian and another by producer Eli Escobar. DFA released the Crime Cutz EP on April 29.

== Critical reception ==
Professional ratings
Aggregate scores
Source	Rating
Metacritic	67/100
Review scores
Source	Rating
Consequence of Sound	C
Pitchfork	7/10
Pretty Much Amazing	B
Under the Radar	7/10 stars

Reviews of Crime Cutz were generally positive, holding an aggregate 67 out of 100 on the website Metacritic based on four critics. Lily Moayeri wrote in her review that "Holy Ghost! has sculpted its production for a sharply defined quadruple hit." Austin Reed, writing for Pretty Much Amazing, praised the band for returning to a little-to-no effort approach that was used in making their self-titled debut album: "Dynamics fell short because neither Frankel nor bandmate Nick Millhiser seemed 100% convinced that what they were doing made any sense. But on tracks like "Crime Cutz", and EP highlight "Compassion Points", that confidence sounds fully restored and more galvanized than ever".

Cameron Cook of Pitchfork honored Crime Cutz as "a bright, tight, tense mini-epic, solidifying [Holy Ghost!] as one of the pillars of the mid-'00s disco resurgence." His only major criticism of the EP was its lack of stylistic variety: "you spend a lot of the record hoping for something to take them even further over the edge, but they continue to pull back until the very end." The group's lack of musical risk on the EP was also criticized in a more mixed review by Sackllah, spotlighting "Compass Point" as the set's only memorable track: "At best, Crime Cutz is a decent release by a talented group that clearly has potential to make some great retro records. At its lowest points, it’s filled with clumsy lyrics and meandering tracks that never really go anywhere."

== Track listing ==
No.	Title	Length
1.	"Crime Cutz"	7:03
2.	"Stereotype"	5:15
3.	"Compass Point"	5:12
4.	"Footsteps"	4:17
Total length:		21:47
