= Der Half-Machine 10" =

Der Half-Machine

EP by the Juan MacLean
- Released: March 7, 2005
- Genres: Electronica, electroclash
- Length: 10:26
- Label: DFA Records

Professional ratings
Review scores
| Source | Rating |
|---|---|
| AllMusic | (3/5) |

Der Half-Machine is a two track EP by electronic artist the Juan MacLean, formerly of Six Finger Satellite. It was released on DFA Records in March 2005. It was meant as a preview of the upcoming full-length album Less Than Human. Neither of these tracks were released on the Less Than Human album but are both available on the DFA Compilation, Vol. 2.

== Track listing ==
1. "I Robot" – 6:12
2. "Less Than Human" – 4:14
