= Prinzhorn =

Prinzhorn is a surname. Notable people with the name include:

- Hans Prinzhorn (1886–1933), German psychiatrist and art historian
- Thomas Prinzhorn (born 1943), Austrian industrialist and politician

== See also ==
- Prinzhorn Dance School, English rock music group
- Prinzhorn Dance School (album), the debut album by British alternative rock band Prinzhorn Dance School
