= The Future Will Come =

Studio album by the Juan MacLean
- Released: April 14, 2009
- Recorded: Flymax Studios (Woodstock, New York)
- Genres: House; nu-disco
- Length: 60:26
- Label: DFA
- Producers: The Juan MacLean, the DFA

The Juan MacLean chronology
Visitations (2006)	The Future Will Come (2009)	DJ-Kicks (2010)

The Future Will Come is the second album by American electronic artist the Juan MacLean. It was released by DFA Records on April 14, 2009 in the UK, and in the US on April 21, 2009. The album is heavily influenced by British synthpop band the Human League, and it incorporates many themes from science fiction. The Future Will Come received somewhat positive reviews from music critics and yielded three singles: "Happy House", "The Simple Life", and "One Day".

Following the release of "Happy House", the band embarked on a European tour to promote the single and returned to the U.S. before the release of "The Simple Life". After the album was released the following year, the Juan MacLean promoted it with a one-month European tour followed by a U.S. tour with Swedish electronic musician the Field.

== Recording ==
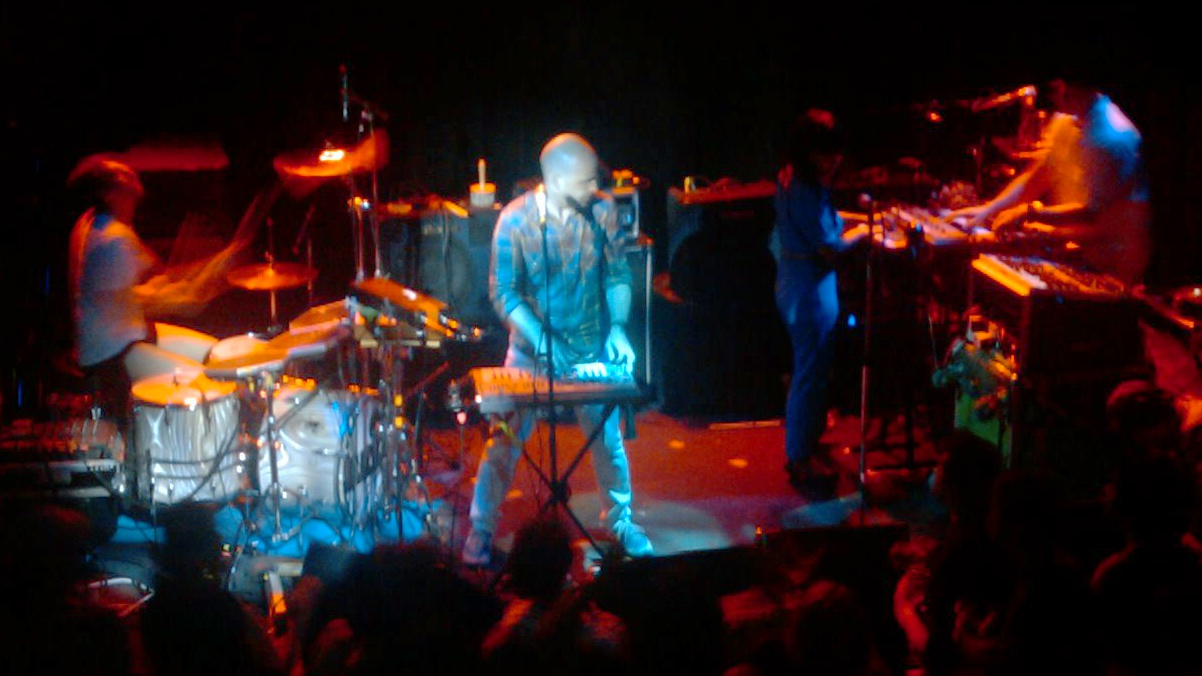
The Juan MacLean performing on the DFA + Kompakt Tour in 2009.

John MacLean and Nancy Whang wrote the album at a studio in Woodstock, New York. Several of the songs were co-written with Nick Millhiser and Alex Frankel from synthpop duo Holy Ghost!. MacLean stated that he wanted "to use dance music production techniques to make pop songs." To move away from the common first-person narrative used in popular music, they decided to feature their voices equally. MacLean and Whang sought examples of songs that had male and female narrators but struggled to find any aside from the Human League.

The music on The Future Will Come is influenced by Detroit techno, especially the Belleville Three. MacLean used the Roland SH-101 as his main synthesizer lead and the Roland TB-303 bass synthesizer. Influenced by electronic band Kraftwerk, many of the songs use robot metaphors to describe emotional detachment in relationships. The album's futuristic lyrics are inspired by science fiction writers Philip K. Dick and William Gibson as well as dystopian films such as Blade Runner, Logan's Run, and THX 1138.

== Singles ==
"Happy House"
Lead single "Happy House" was noted for being one of the album's more joyful moments.

The 12-minute closing track "Happy House" was released as the lead single in early 2008. The song's lyrics are cheerful and romantic, with Whang providing distant-sounding vocals. In a review for The Guardian, Dorian Lynskey likened the song to the work of Chicago house musician Larry Heard, and Pitchfork reviewer Douglas Wolk noted the similarity between the song's piano riff and that of Dubtribe Sound System's "Do It Now".

Remixes were commissioned by artists including VHS or Beta, Will Saul, Paul Woolford, and Matthew Dear. "Happy House" ranked number 37 on the 2008 Pazz & Jop survey, and Pitchfork listed it number 20 on its list of the year's best tracks. The music video for "Happy House" was directed by the Wilderness and premiered in August 2009. It shows Whang in a futuristic veil, accompanied by back-up dancers dressed in white. They are illuminated by colorful LEDs.

Opening track "The Simple Life" was released as a single later in 2008. In it, MacLean sings the verses in a conversational style, with Whang singing the chorus. Its synthesizer arpeggios were compared to the work of Italian producer Giorgio Moroder. "One Day" became the album's final single in 2009. The rave song has MacLean and Whang responding to each other with spiteful lines about a breakup. Its music video was directed by Patrick Longstreth.

== Critical reception ==
Professional ratings
Aggregate scores
Source	Rating
Metacritic	71/100
Review scores
Source	Rating
AllMusic	4/5 stars
Entertainment Weekly	B+
The Guardian	3/5 stars
NME	8/10
Pitchfork	7.4/10
PopMatters	5/10
Rolling Stone	3/5 stars

The Future Will Come received somewhat positive reviews from music critics. Entertainment Weekly described the album as "by and large, a fun ride, all squiggly synth wah-wahs, airy vocal coos, and funked-up drums". Pitchfork described the music as "post-disco dance-pop aesthetics intersecting and merging in ways that transcend cheap retro", adding that the use of more longer tracks would have allowed it "a bit more breathing room." NME described the music as "Dionysian disco: dynamic, decadent and utterly brilliant."

Reviewers were mixed on the album's use of mechanical musical themes. PopMatters wrote that the influence of "future shock and technological singularity are clearly on MacLean's mind…his music does not seem to be advancing in brave new directions." AllMusic compared the album to the group's debut Less Than Human and praised its "more user-friendly approach, injecting warmth and buoyancy into the typical machine music tropes of house and techno." Rolling Stone agreed, commenting that the relative lack of programming had allowed for more "stretched-out, club-wrecking grooves". The Guardian, however, opined that MacLean "frustratingly boxes himself into the synth-pop format of the Human League." It elaborated that Whang's caustic responses were enjoyable but "Maclean's own flat Phil Oakeyisms not so much."

== Track listing ==
No.	Title	Writer(s)	Length
1.	"The Simple Life"	Alex Frankel, Juan Maclean, Nancy Whang, Nicholas Millhiser	8:36
2.	"The Future Will Come"	Maclean	4:53
3.	"One Day"	Frankel, Maclean, Whang	4:15
4.	"A New Bot"	Maclean, Whang	3:14
5.	"Tonight"	Frankel, Maclean, Whang	10:06
6.	"No Time"	Maclean, Whang	3:52
7.	"Accusations"	Frankel, Maclean, Whang	5:29
8.	"The Station"	Frankel, Maclean, Whang, Millhiser	3:37
9.	"Human Disaster"	Maclean	3:44
10.	"Happy House"	Frankel, Maclean, Whang, Millhiser	12:27
