= DFA Holiday Mix 2005 =

Compilation album by The DFA
- Released: October 25, 2005
- Recorded: Unknown
- Genre: Dance-punk, Indietronica
- Length: 47:54
- Label: DFA Records
- Producer: The DFA

The DFA chronology
DFA Compilation, Vol. 2 (2004)	DFA Holiday Mix 2005 (2005)	The DFA Remixes – Chapter One (2006)

DFA Holiday Mix 2005 is a compilation of tracks and remixes by various artists on the dance-punk label The DFA. It was released on October 31, 2005 in the UK and October 25, 2005 in the US. In the UK it was sold cheaply and was widely available across many record stores. However, in the US it was only made available in limited quantities from the DFA Records webstore.

== Track listing ==
1. "Black Dice - Smiling Off (DFA Mix/Luomo Mix)" – 5:30
2. "LCD Soundsystem - Too Much Love (Rub'n'tug Mix)" – 7:03
3. "The Juan Maclean – Give Me Every Little Thing (Dub)" – 4:48
4. "The Juan Maclean – Tito’s Way (Reverso 68 Mix/Lp Version/Booka Shade Mix)" – 7:42
5. "The Juan Maclean – Give Me Every Little Thing (Cajmere Mix/Xpress 2 Bonus Beats/Putsch 79 Disco Dub)" – 4:00
6. "Black Dice - ABA (LP Version)" – 2:00
7. "Delia Gonzalez & Gavin Russom - #5" – 3:34
8. "LCD Soundsystem - Tribulations (Tiga’s Out Of The Trance Closet Mix)" – 7:52
9. "LCD Soundsystem - Daft Punk Is Playing at My House (Soulwax Shibuya Mix)" – 5:25
