= We Got a Love =

Studio album by Shit Robot
- Released: 18 March 2014
- Length: 52:22
- Label: DFA

Shit Robot chronology
From the Cradle to the Rave (2010)	We Got a Love (2014)	What Follows (2016)

Professional ratings
Aggregate scores
Source	Rating
Metacritic	67/100
Review scores
Source	Rating
AllMusic	4/5 stars
DIY	3/5 stars
Exclaim!	8/10
MusicOMH	3.5/5 stars
Pitchfork	6.4/10

We Got a Love is the second studio album by Irish musician and producer Shit Robot. It was released on 18 March 2014 under DFA Records.

== Critical reception ==
We Got a Love was met with generally favorable reviews from critics. At Metacritic, which assigns a weighted average rating out of 100 to reviews from mainstream publications, this release received an average score of 67, based on 11 reviews

== Track listing ==
We Got a Love track listing
No.	Title	Length
1.	"The Secret" (featuring Reggie Watts)	6:48
2.	"Dingbat" (featuring Pat Mahoney, Dennis McNany)	6:35
3.	"Do That Dance" (featuring James Murphy, Nancy Whang)	5:33
4.	"Do It (Right)" (featuring Lidell Townsell)	6:06
5.	"Feels Real" (featuring Luke Jenner)	5:17
6.	"Space Race"	5:06
7.	"Feels Like" (featuring Holly Backler)	5:26
8.	"We Got a Love" (featuring Reggie Watts)	4:54
9.	"Tempest" (featuring Leo Pearson)	6:37
