= American Dream (LCD Soundsystem album) =

2017 studio album

Studio album by LCD Soundsystem
- Released: September 1, 2017
- Recorded: October 2015 – May 2017
- Studios: DFA (New York City); Lanark (London); Strongroom (London); The Church (London); B-Side (Portland, Oregon)
- Genres: Dance-punk; new wave; post-punk; synth-pop; art rock
- Length: 68:38
- Labels: DFA; Columbia
- Producer: James Murphy

LCD Soundsystem chronology
The Long Goodbye: LCD Soundsystem Live at Madison Square Garden (2014)	American Dream (2017)	Electric Lady Sessions (2019)

LCD Soundsystem studio albums chronology
This Is Happening (2010)	American Dream (2017)

Singles from American Dream
- 1. "Call the Police" / "American Dream" Released: May 5, 2017; 2. "Tonite" Released: August 16, 2017; 3. "Oh Baby" Released: September 20, 2018

American Dream is the fifth studio album by the American rock band LCD Soundsystem, released on September 1, 2017, by DFA and Columbia. It was their first album in seven years, following This Is Happening (2010), and their first since disbanding in 2011.

LCD Soundsystem performed at large festivals and smaller shows to promote their reunion. "Call the Police" and "American Dream" were released together as the lead single, followed by "Tonite" and "Oh Baby".

American Dream reached number 1 on the Top Rock Albums chart and was LCD Soundsystem's first number-one album in the US, Canada and Portugal. It received acclaim, appeared on many year-end lists, and was named "Album of the Year" by Mojo and Uncut. At the 60th Annual Grammy Awards, it was nominated for Best Alternative Music Album and "Tonite" won the Grammy Award for Best Dance Recording.

== Background ==
LCD Soundsystem's previous studio album, This Is Happening, was released in 2010. The band announced their breakup in early 2011 and announced that they would end with a show at Madison Square Garden on April 2, 2011. Due to the raising of ticket prices by scalpers, the band made plans to perform warm-up shows at Terminal 5 in Manhattan, New York. After their final show, they released a documentary film in 2012, which followed the band prior to the show and featured footage of the actual performance. The album The Long Goodbye: LCD Soundsystem Live at Madison Square Garden, which contained the audio from the show, was released in 2014 as a Record Store Day release.

In October 2015, Consequence of Sound reported that LCD Soundsystem would be reuniting in 2016 and that they would be headlining "high-profile music festivals in the US and UK". This report was later confirmed by Billboard. However, DFA Records label manager Kris Petersen stated that LCD Soundsystem would not be reuniting. DFA co-founder Jonathan Galkin also confirmed this in a Pitchfork article. Two months afterward, the band released the Christmas-themed track "Christmas Will Break Your Heart", acting as their first piece of new material since their cover of Franz Ferdinand's "Live Alone", released in 2011. Consequence of Sound and Pitchfork both reported again, after the release of the Christmas single, that multiple sources could confirm a reunion in 2016.

On January 4, 2016, it was announced that LCD Soundsystem would be headlining the 2016 Coachella Festival. The following day, the band announced that they would be preparing a new album for 2016. It was later revealed that the band signed with Columbia Records. Following a backlash by some online users against the reunion, Murphy explained his reasoning for the reunion in a post on the band's website. He stated that he did not want to release a solo album with live performances including LCD Soundsystem members, nor did he want to release an LCD Soundsystem album with entirely different people playing live, that is, if the original members did not want to create a new record. He had invited past members Nancy Whang and Pat Mahoney to his apartment to talk about releasing new material, and both agreed on making a new LCD Soundsystem record together.

== Recording ==
The band recorded the album in multiple locations. Like previous albums Sound of Silver and This Is Happening, one of the recording locations was DFA Studios in New York City. Murphy announced after finishing recording that American Dream would be the last record to be recorded at the original DFA Studios building. Recording also took place at the Lanark, Strongroom, and Church Studios in London and B-Side Studios in Portland, Oregon. The band were forced to cancel tour dates for shows in Asia and Australia dated during the near-end of 2016 in order to complete work on the album. After this was revealed, it was suggested that the release date for the album would be moved into 2017, as opposed to the original prediction of 2016, as the recording was predicted to take another few months. It was noted in April 2017 that the band had been working on the album for 18 months. In a Facebook post in May, Murphy announced that the album was finished and that it was being prepared for mastering.

== Composition ==
American Dream has been described as dance-punk, new wave, post-punk, synth-pop, art rock and dance-rock. Critics noted similarities to David Bowie's Berlin Trilogy. The lyrics deal with depression, social issues, fear, and ending of friendship and love. The closing track, "Black Screen", is an homage to Bowie. Murphy wanted to have Canadian singer-songwriter Leonard Cohen to perform a spoken word piece at the end of the track, but Cohen died a few days after he came up with the idea.

== Packaging ==
The cover art was revealed on August 4, 2017. The artwork, which has been labeled as "straightforward" and having a "simple aesthetic", is a painting titled Up by Murphy's friend Robert Reynolds. It consists of a blue sky with a few clouds and a white-hot sun in the middle. The band's name and the album title are aligned on top of the painting. It has also been labeled as the band's most colorful artwork to date. People thought of the artwork as a possible homage to the front cover of the 1996 David Foster Wallace novel Infinite Jest, a book with which Murphy was known to have long been familiar. Reynolds, however, dismissed any intentional similarity to the novel in an interview. After the artwork was revealed, it attracted criticism from users on Twitter. One user jokingly stated that they considered cancelling their vinyl pre-order due to their dislike of the cover art. Other users compared it, quality-wise, to a preset for a slide on Microsoft PowerPoint and the cover art for Kasabian's 2017 album For Crying Out Loud. Billboard's Tatiana Cirisano listed the album cover as one of the worst of 2017, saying that it "looks like it could have been concocted using a stock photo and some toying with Microsoft Word".

The vinyl release features a gatefold containing two vinyl records, both weighing 140 grams each. A code that grants the buyer with a digital download of the album was also included with the purchase of the vinyl release. The gatefold jacket and inner sleeves are both done in full color. The cassette release includes custom silk-screened cases and shells. The case contains a five-sided insert that is also done in full color and the cassette shell is clear-colored.

== Promotion and release ==
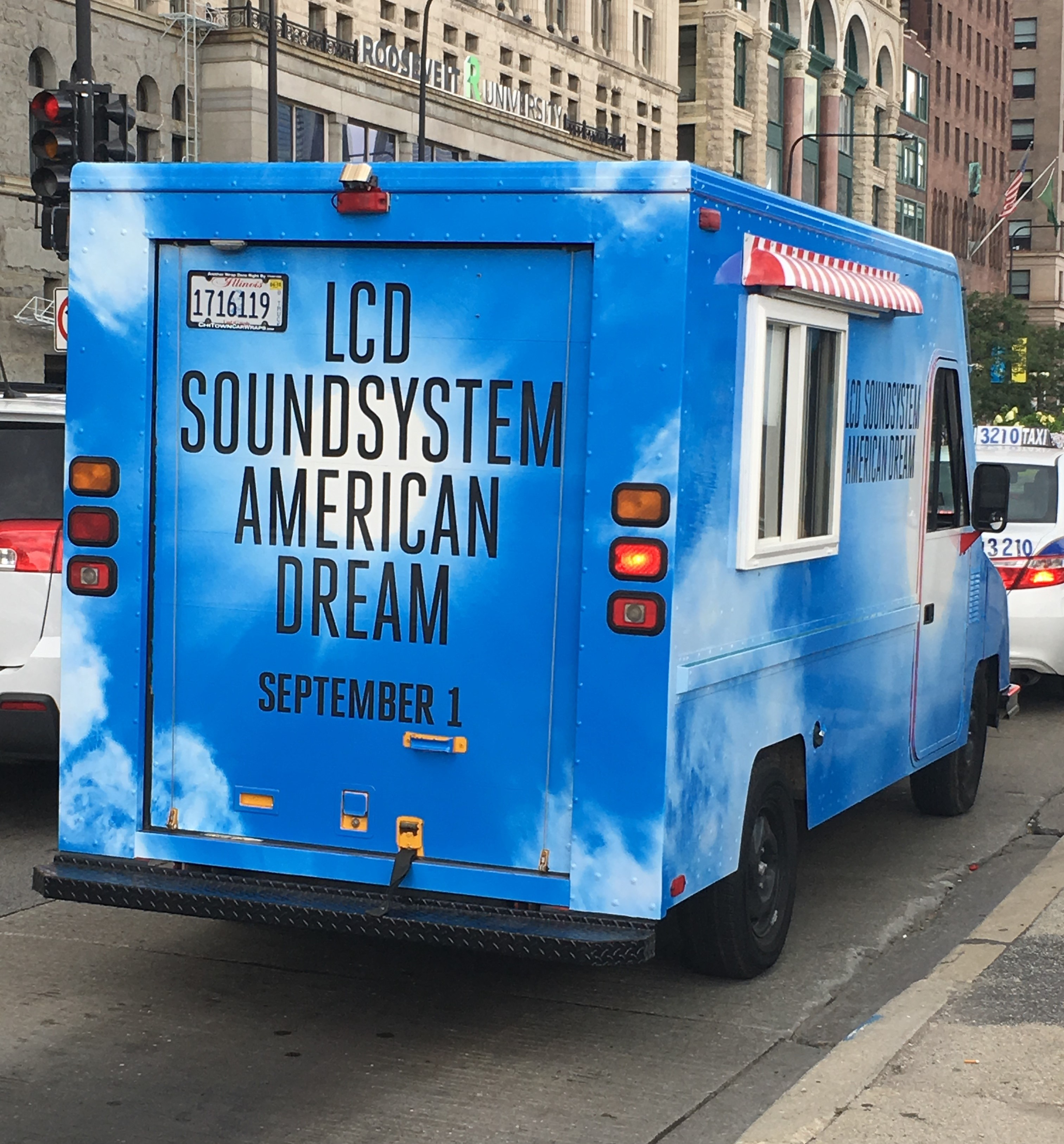
One of many ice cream trucks designed to promote American Dream outside the 2017 Lollapalooza festival in Chicago.

LCD Soundsystem released "Call the Police" and "American Dream" together as a digital double-A-side lead single on May 5, 2017. The two songs were made available for listening once midnight was reached in one's time zone. The band promoted the songs by performing both during the May 6 episode of the 42nd season of Saturday Night Live. On August 4, the band rolled out an ice cream truck outside of the Lollapalooza festival in Chicago promoting the album. The truck played songs from the album in the form of ice cream jingles through its speaker. A Twitter account for the truck was also launched to provide updates on where its current location was. On August 16, "Tonite" was premiered on Zane Lowe's radio show on Beats 1. Along with the premiere was the release of a music video for the track, directed by Joel Kefali. It was also subsequently made available for streaming on Spotify. A virtual reality experience made to accompany the song, titled "Dance Tonite", was released to the public on August 22, though first previewed privately in June. Available to use in a web browser, the experience allowed people with room scale virtual reality kits, such as the Oculus Rift, to dance along to the track. Those with more simpler VR headsets, like the Daydream View, could view the experience as well the dance performances done by others. The band teamed up with the Puckney and Moniker design studios from Amsterdam for the project, alongside Google's data arts team. On August 31, the band released a 14-minute instrumental track, "Pulse (v.1)", as a free download. On Facebook, Murphy wrote that the track was "not precisely part of the record," but instead thought of it as an "addendum" meant to be played after the album's closing track, "Black Screen". It was left off of American Dream due to it not being able to fit on the vinyl format of the album. A music video for "Oh Baby", directed by Rian Johnson, was released on September 20, 2018. The video depicts an elderly couple, portrayed by Sissy Spacek and David Strathairn, who build a teleporter in their garage.

The album's title and track listing were both revealed on June 19, 2017. American Dream was released on September 1, 2017, through DFA Records and Columbia Records. The band started accepting pre-orders of the album on August 4. A limited edition cassette release of the album was made available on the band's official Bandcamp page. Different options were given for the vinyl release besides a standard edition; there were also options given to buy a bundle of the vinyl plus either a tote bag, a poster, or postcard photos autographed by the band. European digital retailer Qobuz made the album available for download and streaming in a lossless format. The Japanese CD release of the album contains "Pulse (v.1)" as a bonus track, placed at the very end of the album. American Dream received a digital re-release on October 6, which also included "Pulse (v.1)" as a bonus track.

== Tour ==
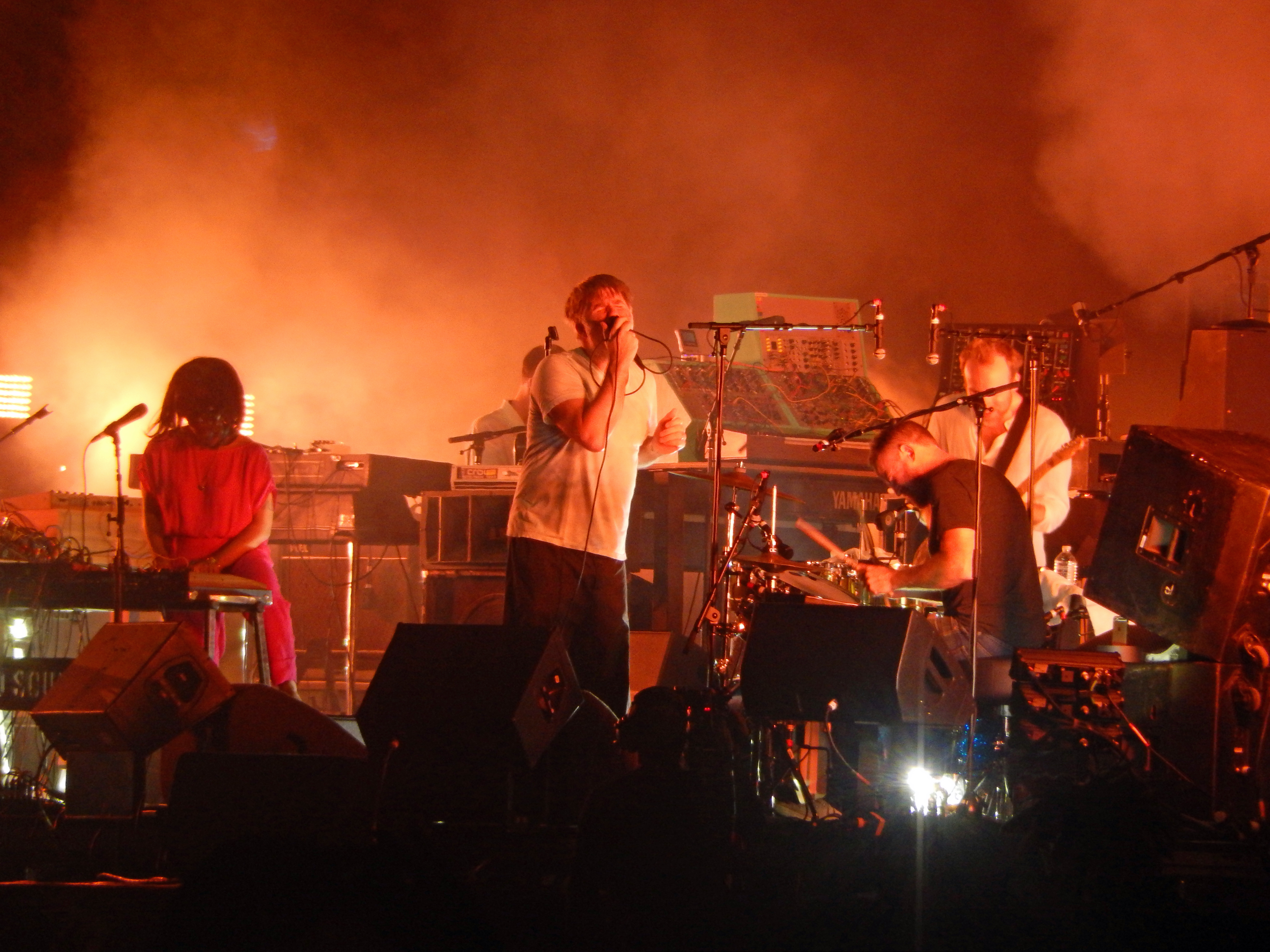
LCD Soundsystem at Lollapalooza in 2016, one of many festivals visited during their tour.

Along with the initial announcement of a new album, LCD Soundsystem indicated an expanded tour that went on throughout 2016, including both smaller shows and appearances at festivals that they headlined. The first show of their tour took place on March 27 at Webster Hall in East Village, Manhattan. This marked their first show in almost five years (following their farewell show). It had a ticket distribution system in the form of a lottery. Festivals that they headlined in 2016 include the Coachella, Lollapalooza, Outside Lands, Bonnaroo, and Austin City Limits festivals in the US, as well as being on top bill at Primavera in Barcelona in June. They also headlined the Other Stage, the second stage at Glastonbury Festival in the UK, in June 2016. In September, the band headlined the Sunday show of LouFest in St. Louis. The band was scheduled to perform at the III Points Festival during October in Miami, Florida, but were forced to cancel their set due to weather complications caused by Hurricane Matthew.

The band's first live appearance of 2017 took place at the then-recently opened Brooklyn Steel in New York City. It was during their five-night residency at the venue where they performed album tracks "Tonite", "Call the Police", "American Dream", and "Emotional Haircut" live for the first time. The band had also made a plea to those in attendance to not record these performances so the songs can be formally released by the band themselves. They later performed a set at a Google I/O conference on 18 May. It was here where the Dance Tonite VR experience was initially previewed. On June 19, the band announced dates for a world tour, spanning from June to December 2017. The band also performed second and third stints at Brooklyn Steel during the tour, totaling to 22 sold out dates at the venue in 2017 and almost 40,000 tickets sold. In early 2018, the band was set for a return to New Zealand and Australia only 7 months after a brief tour of the latter, but all shows were cancelled due to "unforeseen circumstances".

== Reception ==
=== Critical ===
Professional ratings
Aggregate scores
Source	Rating
AnyDecentMusic?	8.2/10
Metacritic	86/100
Review scores
Source	Rating
AllMusic	4/5 stars
The A.V. Club	A−
The Daily Telegraph	5/5 stars
Entertainment Weekly	A−
The Guardian	5/5 stars
Mojo	4/5 stars
NME	5/5 stars
Pitchfork	8.5/10
Q	4/5 stars
Rolling Stone	4/5 stars

On review aggregator Metacritic, American Dream received an average score of 86 out of 100, based on 37 reviews, indicating "universal acclaim". At the online review aggregator AnyDecentMusic?, the album received a score of 8.2 out of a possible score of 10 based on the aggregate score taken from 36 reviews.

Leah Greenblatt of Entertainment Weekly wrote that American Dream "feels like exactly the album 2017 needs—urgent, angry, achingly self-aware". Ryan Dombal of Pitchfork named it the week's "Best New Music", said: "The rebirth of LCD Soundsystem is marked by an extraordinary album obsessed with endings: of friendships, of love, of heroes, of a certain type of geeky fandom, and of the American dream itself."

Jordan Bassett of NME wrote: "The band retains the uncanny power to encapsulate a place and time. This is a cautious return, not a triumphant one – and that proves LCD Soundsystem are very 2017". Rachel Aroesti of The Guardian also gave it 5 out of 5 stars, saying: "Packed with aural allusions to Bowie and Brian Eno, LCD Soundsystem's comeback is a virtuosic tribute to their heroes – and themselves." Sean O'Neal of The A.V. Club wrote: "As far as American Dream being better than that estimable trilogy that preceded it, well, it depends mightily on how you define 'better'. It's a beautifully produced, masterfully realized album, but it's also a bit of a downer and an unusually slow burn".

Victoria Segal of Mojo wrote: "American Dream feels like a strong re-statement of what they do, and what they can mean, a record that, despite its fear of death, feels very much alive." In a review for Rolling Stone, Rob Sheffield wrote: "James Murphy and his wrecking crew of New York punk-disco marauders don't waste a moment on the superb American Dream – it's a relentless, expansive, maddeningly funny set of songs asking how a lifetime of good intentions and hard work can blow up into such a mess."

However, Andy Gill of The Independent wrote that many tracks "suffer from a shortfall of melodic potency, and a lack of lateral development, especially in longer pieces", and that "often, the journey just isn't worth the destination". Joseph Stannard of The Wire was scathing about "the inexpressive lite-white stadium bluster of the tracks – frequently recalling U2 at their bloated worst [...] This record is no cause for celebration. It's a slab of nothing, a media spectacle for the terminally impressed."

=== Commercial ===
American Dream sold 85,000 equivalent album units, 81,000 being traditional album sales, in the United States. This led to the band's first number-one album on the Billboard 200 chart and their second in the top ten, following This Is Happening (2010). A promotion involving concert tickets that gave out copies of the album with a ticket purchase helped increase sales numbers. It also became the band's first number-one album in Canada and Portugal. The album also debuted at number 3 in Ireland, Scotland, and the United Kingdom. It also entered the top ten in Australia and New Zealand and the top twenty in both of the Belgian albums charts, France, the Netherlands, and Spain.

=== Accolades ===
The album was placed on numerous year-end album lists. It reached the top-ten in several lists, while also appearing at number one on Mojo's and Uncut's lists. At the 60th Annual Grammy Awards, the album was nominated for Best Alternative Music Album and the song "Tonite" was nominated for Best Dance Recording. The album lost to Sleep Well Beast by the National, while "Tonite" won in its category. This marked the first Grammy win for the band, after being nominated five different times previously without winning.

Publication	List	Rank	Ref.
Entertainment Weekly	The 25 best albums of 2017	6	
Exclaim	Top 20 Pop & Rock Albums of 2017	5	
Mojo	Mojo's best albums of 2017	1	
NME	NME's Albums of the Year 2017	5	
Paste	The 50 Best Albums of 2017	8	
Pitchfork	The 50 Best Albums of 2017	12	
PopMatters	The 60 Best Albums of 2017	5	
Q	Q Magazine's 50 Best Albums of 2017	2	
Riot Mag	Riot's Albums of the Year 2017	7	
Rolling Stone	50 Best Albums of 2017	5	
Spectrum Culture	Top 20 Albums of 2017	2	
Stereogum	The 50 Best Albums of 2017	9	
Time	The Top 10 Albums of 2017	10	
Uncut	Albums of the Year	1	
Vinyl Me, Please	The 30 Best Albums of 2017	11	

Year	Ceremony	Nominated work	Recipient(s)	Category	Result
2018	Grammy Awards	American Dream	LCD Soundsystem	Best Alternative Music Album	Nominated
2018	Grammy Awards	"Tonite"	LCD Soundsystem; James Murphy, producer; James Murphy, mixer	Best Dance Recording	Won

== Track listing ==
American Dream
No.	Title	Writer(s)	Length
1.	"Oh Baby"	James Murphy	5:49
2.	"Other Voices"	Murphy; Nancy Whang	6:43
3.	"I Used To"	Murphy; Al Doyle	5:32
4.	"Change Yr Mind"	Murphy; Doyle; Tyler Pope	4:57
5.	"How Do You Sleep?"	Murphy; Doyle; Pat Mahoney; Gavilán Rayna Russom (Note: Credited as Gavin R. Russom; Russom came out as transgender in 2017 and legally changed her name in 2019.)	9:12
6.	"Tonite"	Murphy; Doyle	5:47
7.	"Call the Police"	Murphy; Doyle	6:58
8.	"American Dream"	Murphy	6:06
9.	"Emotional Haircut"	Murphy; Mahoney; Doyle; Russom	5:29
10.	"Black Screen"	Murphy; Doyle	12:05
Total length:			68:38

Japanese edition and digital re-release bonus track
No.	Title	Writer(s)	Length
11.	"Pulse (v.1)"	Murphy; Doyle; Russom; Whang; Korey Richey; Mahoney	13:42
Total length:			82:20

== Personnel ==
All personnel and credits adapted from album liner notes.

LCD Soundsystem

- James Murphy – vocals (all tracks), Gretsch drums (tracks 1–9), EMS Synthi AKS (tracks 1, 2, 6, 7, 9), bass guitar (tracks 2–4, 7, 9), guitar (tracks 2, 3, 7, 9), percussion (tracks 2, 4–6), Roland SH-101 (tracks 1, 5, 8), Synare (tracks 1, 3, 9), Korg MS-20 (tracks 2, 8, 10), ARP Odyssey (tracks 5–7), piano (tracks 3, 7), Roland Jupiter-4 (tracks 3, 6), ARP Omni II (tracks 5, 7), Roland TR-33 (tracks 7, 8), snaps (tracks 7, 8), Oberheim SEM (tracks 7, 8), Roland TR-808 (track 1), Yamaha CS-60 (track 1), DFA custom modular synth (track 1), Roland System-100M (track 1), Crumar Performer (track 1), Moog CDX organ (track 1), Yamaha organ (track 2), Korg SQ-10 (track 2), chop guitar (track 4), Maplin MatrixSynth (track 4), bongos (track 4), Simmons SDSV (track 5), synth bass (track 6), Roland SH-5 (track 6), Korg Trident II (track 8), Moog Voyager (track 8), glockenspiel (track 8), tongue drum (track 9), Korg MS-50 (track 10), Powertran Polysynth (track 10), Fuku-Masu Seq & BSC (track 10)
- Pat Mahoney – drums (tracks 5, 9), vocals (track 9)
- Nancy Whang – vocals (track 2)
- Tyler Pope – bass guitar (track 4)
- Al Doyle – piano (tracks 3, 9, 10), Korg PS-3100 (tracks 3, 9), guitar (tracks 6, 7), vocals (tracks 7, 8), Yamaha CS01 (track 3), snake guitar (track 4), cello (track 5), bowed mandolin (track 5), congas (track 5), Synare (track 6), vocoder controller (track 6), Roland SH-5 (track 6), Korg Delta (track 7), Oberheim OB-3 (track 8)
- Gavilán Rayna Russom – arpeggiated Roland Jupiter-4 (track 5), Korg MS-20 (track 9), Oberheim SEM (track 9), vocals (track 9)
- Matt Thornley (Note: Thornley is credited as a member of the band during recording, but is not attributed to any contributions.)
- Korey Richey – vocals (tracks 2, 7–9), snaps (track 8)

Additional musicians

- Matt Shaw – Yamaha CS-60 (track 1)
- Riley MacIntyre – snaps (track 8)

Production

- James Murphy – production (all tracks), mixing (tracks 1–6, 8, 10)
- Dave Sardy – mixing (tracks 7, 9)
- Bob Weston – mastering
- Korey Richey – mastering assistance, engineering
- Matt Shaw – engineering assistance
- Al Doyle – engineering assistance
- Riley MacIntyre – engineering assistance
- David Jones – engineering assistance
- Raymond Richards – B-side engineering (track 2)
- Cameron Barton – mix assistance

Artwork

- Michael Vadino – art direction, gatefold photos
- Robert Reynolds – original painting UP, 2017
- Jeff McLane – photo of UP
- James Murphy – gatefold photos
- Brian Graf – gatefold photos
- Korey Richey – additional photos

== Charts ==
=== Weekly charts ===
Chart (2017)	Peak position
Australian Albums (ARIA)	10
Austrian Albums (Ö3 Austria)	23
Belgian Albums (Ultratop Flanders)	14
Belgian Albums (Ultratop Wallonia)	14
Canadian Albums (Billboard)	1
Czech Albums (ČNS IFPI)	37
Danish Albums (Hitlisten)	23
Dutch Albums (Album Top 100)	14
French Albums (SNEP)	19
German Albums (Offizielle Top 100)	32
Greek Albums (IFPI)	54
Irish Albums (Official Charts)	3
Italian Albums (FIMI)	60
Japanese Albums (Oricon)	86
New Zealand Albums (RMNZ)	9
Portuguese Albums (AFP)	1
Scottish Albums (Official Charts)	3
Slovak Albums (ČNS IFPI)	96
Spanish Albums (Promusicae)	20
Swedish Albums (Sverigetopplistan)	41
Swiss Albums (Schweizer Hitparade)	25
UK Albums (Official Charts)	3
US Billboard 200	1
US Top Alternative Albums (Billboard)	1
US Top Rock Albums (Billboard)	1

=== Year-end charts ===
Chart (2017)	Position
US Top Rock Albums (Billboard)	43

== Release history ==
Region	Date	Format	Label	Catalog no.
Various	September 1, 2017	CD	DFA; Columbia	88985456102
Various	September 1, 2017	12" vinyl	DFA; Columbia	88985456111
Various	September 1, 2017	Cassette	DFA; Columbia	DFA2566
Various	September 1, 2017	Download; streaming	DFA; Columbia	886446557830
Japan	September 1, 2017	CD	Sony	SICP-5601
Various	October 6, 2017	Download; streaming; (re-release)	DFA; Columbia	886446796475

== Notes and references ==
Notes
