= DFA Compilation, Vol. 1 =

Compilation album by The DFA
- Released: September 30, 2003
- Recorded: Unknown
- Genre: Dance-punk/Electronica
- Length: 1:02:40
- Label: DFA Records
- Producer: The DFA

The DFA chronology
DFA Compilation, Vol. 1 (2003)	DFA Compilation, Vol. 2 (2004)

DFA Compilation, Vol. 1 is a compilation of tracks by various artists signed to the dance-punk label The DFA. The only two tracks contributed here that were not produced by The DFA are "Endless Happiness" and "Cone Toaster", both by Black Dice. The compilation was released on September 30, 2003.

== Track listing ==
1. The Juan MacLean - "By the Time I Get to Venus" – 5:12
2. LCD Soundsystem - "Give It Up" – 3:56
3. The Rapture - "House of Jealous Lovers" – 5:07
4. Black Dice - "Cone Toaster" – 8:57
5. The Juan Maclean - "You Can't Have It Both Ways [Live]" – 9:21
6. The Rapture - "Silent Morning" – 6:48
7. LCD Soundsystem - "Losing My Edge" – 7:53
8. Black Dice - "Endless Happiness" – 15:26
