= DFA Compilation, Vol. 2 =

Compilation album by The DFA
- Released: November 2, 2004
- Recorded: Unknown
- Genre: Dance-punk/Electronica
- Length: 3:05:06
- Label: DFA Records
- Producer: The DFA

The DFA chronology
DFA Compilation, Vol. 1 (2003)	DFA Compilation, Vol. 2 (2004)	DFA Holiday Mix 2005 (2005)

Professional ratings
Review scores
Source	Rating
Allmusic	link
Pitchfork Media	(9.0/10) 3 Nov 2004
PopMatters	(Very Favorable) 2 Dec 2004
Stylus	A− 2 Nov 2004

DFA Compilation, Vol. 2 is a three disc box set released by the dance-punk label DFA Records. It contains tracks and remixes of various artists signed to DFA Records as well as other artists with a close affinity to the label. The first two discs are a collection of recording previously only available on 12-inch vinyl. The third disc is a mix CD of tracks featured on the compilation, and some others, mixed by Tim Goldsworthy and Tim Sweeny. The compilation was released on November 2, 2004.

In 2022 the compilation was issued on vinyl for the first time as a 4 LP boxset.

== Track listing ==
=== CD Version ===
==== Disc one ====
1. Black Leotard Front - "Casual Friday" – 15:07
2. J.O.Y. - "Sunplus [DFA Remix]" – 4:59
3. The Juan Maclean - "I Robot" – 6:12
4. The Rapture - "Alabama Sunshine" – 2:46
5. Delia Gonzalez & Gavin Russom - "Rise [DFA Remix]" – 7:26
6. The Juan Maclean - "Dance Hall Modulator Dub" – 4:07
7. Pixeltan - "Get Up/Say What" – 9:10
8. Black Dice - "Wasteder" – 4:28
9. LCD Soundsystem - "Yeah (Pretentious Version)" – 11:06

==== Disc two ====
1. LCD Soundsystem - "Yeah (Crass Version)" – 9:23
2. Black Dice - "Endless Happiness [Eye Remix]" – 7:41
3. J.O.Y. - "Sunplus" – 4:58
4. LCD Soundsystem - "Beat Connection" – 8:04
5. Delia Gonzalez & Gavin Russom - "El Monte" – 14:14
6. Liquid Liquid - "Bellhead" – 5:39
7. Pixeltan - "That's The Way I Like It" – 4:45
8. The Rapture - "Sister Saviour [DFA Dub]" – 4:27
9. The Juan Maclean - "Less Than Human" – 4:14

==== Disc three ====
1. Pixeltan - "Get Up/Say What" – 5:51
2. The Rapture - "Echoes" – 1:20
3. Liquid Liquid - "Bellhead" - 2:40
4. J.O.Y. - "Sunplus [DFA Remix]" – 4:51
5. Delia Gonzalez & Gavin Russom - "El Monte" – 3:26
6. The Juan Maclean - "Give Me Every Little Thing" – 4:42
7. The Rapture - "Sister Saviour [DFA Dub]" – 3:23
8. Delia Gonzalez & Gavin Russom - "Rise" – 5:29
9. The Juan Maclean - "I Robot" – 4:56
10. Black Dice - "Endless Happiness [Eye Remix]" – 7:53
11. LCD Soundsystem - "On Repeat [Dub]" – 1:51
12. LCD Soundsystem - "Yeah (Crass Version) /Beat Connection" – 10:16

=== 2022 Vinyl reissue ===
==== Disc 1 ====
Side A

1. Black Leotard Front - "Casual Friday"

Side B

1. J.O.Y. - "Sunplus" (DFA remix)
2. The Juan Maclean - I Robot
3. The Juan Maclean - Dance Hall Modulator Dub

==== Disc 2 ====
Side C

1. Delia Gonzalez & Gavin Russom - "Rise [DFA Remix]"
2. Black Dice - "Wasteder"
3. J.O.Y. - "Sunplus"

Side D

1. LCD Soundsystem - "Yeah (Pretentious Version)
2. The Rapture - "Sister Saviour [DFA Dub]"

==== Disc 3 ====
Side E

1. Liquid Liquid - "Bellhead"
2. LCD Soundsystem - "Yeah (Crass Version)

Side F

1. Delia Gonzalez & Gavin Russom - "El Monte"
2. The Rapture - "Alabama Sunshine"

==== Disc 4 ====
Side G

1. Pixeltan - "Get Up/Say What"
2. LCD Soundsystem - "Beat Connection"

Side H

1. Pixeltan - "That's The Way I Like It"
2. Black Dice - "Endless Happiness [Eye Remix]"
3. The Juan Maclean - "Less Than Human"
