= New Build =

British electronic music band based in London

- Origin: London, UK
- Genres: Synthpop, alternative dance, electronic
- Years active: 2011–present
- Labels: Lanark Recordings; Sunday Best Recordings
- Spinoff of: Hot Chip
- Members: Al Doyle; Felix Martin; Tom Hopkins; Joy Leah Joseph
- Past members: Pat Mahoney; Janine Rostron; Owen Clarke; Sarah Jones; Mark Ralph; Rupert Clervaux; Charlie Michael; Ben Ubly

New Build is a British electronic music band based in London. The band consists of Hot Chip members Al Doyle, Felix Martin plus composer Tom Hopkins. Their first album Yesterday Was Lived and Lost was released in the UK on 5 March 2012 (and in the United States on 3 April 2012).

Their second album Pour It On was released by Sunday Best Recordings, worldwide on 20 October 2014. The first single "The Sunlight" was premiered by Pitchfork on 21 August. Both New Build albums have been mixed and finished at Club Ralph, the studio of Mark Ralph (Clean Bandit, Franz Ferdinand, Hot Chip) in north London, and Pour It On was mastered by Mike Marsh at the Exchange.

Early on New Build received national radio play on the BBC by DJs including Mary Anne Hobbes, Nick Grimshaw, Rob Da Bank and Peter Serafinowicz, featured in worldwide publications such as Rolling Stone magazine, Mixmag and The Guardian and prior to releasing their first album released two singles on their own label Lanark Recordings, the first entitled "Misery Loves Company", the second "Do You Not Feel Loved?"....

== History ==
=== Formation and Yesterday Was Lived and Lost ===
New Build was formed in 2010, although core members Felix Martin and Al Doyle had previously worked together since meeting in 2001.

Working and touring together as members of the British electronic music band Hot Chip, Doyle and Martin began to record songs at their own studio, Lanark Studios, in London in 2007. One of these early recordings, "The Stone That The Builder Rejected", was subsequently featured under the artist name "Lanark" on the Hot Chip entry of the "DJ Kicks" compilation series.

Doyle and Martin were subsequently joined by Tom Hopkins, an electronic composer who began working as an engineer at Lanark Studios in 2009, as Hot Chip began work there recording part of their album One Life Stand.

The trio began writing and recording original compositions together around this time, collaborating with Pat Mahoney from the New York-based band LCD Soundsystem on the track "Guitar Man" and with Bolton-born producer and vocalist Planningtorock on several other tracks.

In September 2011, New Build released their first public track, a free download entitled "Finding Reasons". The trio subsequently established their own independent record label Lanark Recordings. Their first release was a vinyl only 12" single featuring the tracks "Misery Loves Company", "Guitar Man" and a remix of "Finding Reasons" by Planningtorock. Their second release is another 12" entitled "Do You Not Feel Loved?", made public in January 2012. It features remixes by the German DJ and techno producer Dominik Eulberg and the Amsterdam-based musicians Juju & Jordash.

Their first public appearance as a live band was in November 2011 at the Elektrowerkz venue in London. This was followed by shows at the Paradiso in Amsterdam and at the Eurosonic Festival in Groningen in January 2012.

The band undertook their first headline tour in March 2012 to mark the release of their first album Including sold-out shows in the UK, Europe and New York, plus a trip to the SXSW festival in Austin. In April 2013, armed with the one-off single "False Thing", the band headlined the Britweek Festival in Los Angeles and subsequently toured the West Coast of the USA. This Los Angeles showcase was gatecrashed by The Rolling Stones stealing the venue that was booked, as reported in the LA Times and other media.

=== Pour It On ===
In August 2014, the band announced the intent to release their 2nd album internationally on Sunday Best Recordings, and revealed the new song "The Sunlight" with a video directed by friends Sam Lawlor and Lindsey Pollock, premiered on Pitchfork Media. The release date of the album was 20 October and was available for preorder with "The Sunlight" as an instant grat track. The Guardian said of the song: "Al & Felix Hot Chip nail that soul-crushing melancholic electronic moodiness on this new track".

=== Discography ===
- 2011: "Misery Loves Company" - 12" Single
- 2012: "Do You Not Feel Loved?" -12" Single
- 2012: Yesterday Was Lived and Lost
- 2012: Your Love- Digital EP
- 2012: Medication - USB EP
- 2013: "False Thing" - Digital Single
- 2014: "The Sunlight" - Digital Single
- 2014: "Look In Vain" - Digital Single
- 2014: Pour It On
