= Call the Police (LCD Soundsystem song) =

- Double A-side single cover art

Single by LCD Soundsystem

from the album American Dream
- B-side: "American Dream" (double A-side)
- Released: May 5, 2017
- Genre: Post-punk; alternative rock; art rock; synth-funk
- Length: 7:01
- Label: DFA; Columbia
- Songwriters: James Murphy; Al Doyle
- Producer: James Murphy

LCD Soundsystem singles chronology
"Christmas Will Break Your Heart" (2015)	"Call the Police" (2017)	"Tonite" (2017)

"Call the Police" is a song by American rock band LCD Soundsystem. It was released together with "American Dream" as a digital double A-side single on May 5, 2017, through DFA Records and Columbia Records, as the lead single from their fourth studio album, American Dream (2017). The song peaked at number 78 in Scotland and number 26 on the Billboard Hot Rock Songs chart.

== Background and composition ==
Prior to the official release of the song, "Call the Police" was first performed live during one of the band's sets at the then-recently opened Brooklyn Steel venue in Brooklyn, New York. It was performed during the first encore of their April 6 show, where it was known as "Call Police" on the setlist. The band had made a plea to those in attendance at the show, asking them not to film their performance so they could officially release the track the way they wish to do so.

"Call the Police" was mixed by Dave Sardy at his studio in Los Angeles and mastered by Bob Weston at Chicago Mastering Service. The track has been noted as a post-punk song by some music critics. Eric Shorey of Nylon felt as though the song didn't deviate too far away from the band's general style of music, noting that "it's not hard to imagine the new jam entering the canon of dance-punk classics." The track drew comparisons to the work of David Bowie; James Murphy's vocals were compared to Bowie's, the guitars were noted as similar to those of his song "'Heroes'", and Rhian Daly of NME wrote that the song "shares the galactic explorer feel of some of Bowie‘s finest work," using his "Moonage Daydream" track as an example. Comparisons were also drawn to U2, Brian Eno, and New Order, particularly their song "Procession", the melody of which Pitchfork noted "Call the Police" "borrow[ed] liberally from".

== Release ==
"Call the Police" was released alongside "American Dream" as a double A-side single digitally on May 5, 2017; they were made available once midnight was reached in one's time zone. The release acts as the band's first non-Christmas single in seven years (if "Christmas Will Break Your Heart" is not counted). The single release was accompanied by a post on the band's official Facebook page, which also included an update regarding the progress of their upcoming studio album. The band later performed "Call the Police" during the May 6 episode of Saturday Night Live's 42nd season.

== Track listing ==
Digital release
No.	Title	Length
1.	"Call the Police"	7:01
2.	"American Dream"	6:13
Total length:		13:14

Promotional CD single
No.	Title	Length
1.	"Call the Police" (radio edit)	4:11
2.	"Call the Police"	7:01
Total length:		11:12

== Personnel ==
All personnel adapted from American Dream liner notes.

- James Murphy — vocals, drums, Roland TR-33, snaps, bass guitar, guitar, piano, ARP Odyssey, EMS Synthi AKS, ARP Omni II, Oberheim SEM
- Al Doyle — Korg Delta, guitar, vocals
- Korey Richey — vocals
- Dave Sardy — mixing

== Charts ==
Chart (2017)	Peak position
Scottish Singles Sales (Official Charts)	78
UK Singles Downloads (Official Charts)	91
US Hot Rock & Alternative Songs (Billboard)	26
US Hot Singles Sales (Billboard)	5
