= Tonite (LCD Soundsystem song) =

Single by LCD Soundsystem

from the album American Dream
- Released: August 16, 2017
- Genre: Dance-punk; synth-pop; acid house; electro-disco
- Length: 5:47
- Label: DFA; Columbia
- Songwriters: James Murphy; Al Doyle
- Producer: James Murphy

LCD Soundsystem singles chronology
"Call the Police" (2017)	"Tonite" (2017)	"Oh Baby" (2018)

Music video
- "tonite" on YouTube

"Tonite" (stylized as "tonite" on digital releases) is a song by American rock band LCD Soundsystem. It was released as the second single from their fourth studio album, American Dream (2017), on August 16, 2017, through DFA Records and Columbia Records. A music video for the song was also premiered on the same day. The song peaked at number 191 in France and number 33 on the Billboard Dance/Electronic Songs chart. At the 60th Annual Grammy Awards, the song won the award for Best Dance Recording, making it the band's first Grammy win.

== Production and composition ==
"Tonite" was written by band members Al Doyle and James Murphy, who jointly performed all the instruments for the song. Doyle performed guitar, keyboards, electronic drums, and was the vocoder controller. Murphy served as the mixer and producer and performed synthesizer, drums, and percussion, while also being the vocalist. Many different pieces of equipment were used for the song; ARP Odyssey, Jupiter 4, EMS Synthi AKS, and Roland SH-5 synthesizers were used as well as the Synare electronic drum kit. Musically, "Tonite" has been described as featuring dance-punk, synth-pop, acid house, and electro-disco.

== Release and reception ==
The song was previously premiered live during the band's shows at the Brooklyn Steel venue earlier in April 2017. The studio version of "Tonite" was premiered on August 16, 2017, on Zane Lowe's radio show on Beats 1. On the same day, the song was made available for download and streaming, with a music video also being released.

At the 60th Annual Grammy Awards, "Tonite" won the award for Best Dance Recording. The win gave the band their first Grammy award, after being previously nominated five times but failing to win.

== Personnel ==
Personnel adapted from American Dream liner notes.

- James Murphy – ARP Odyssey, synth bass, drums, percussion, Jupiter 4, EMS Synthi AKS, Roland SH-5, vocals; mixing
- Al Doyle – Synare, guitar, vocoder controller, Roland SH-5

== Charts ==
Chart (2017)	Peak position
France (SNEP)	191
Iceland (Tónlistinn)	37
US Hot Dance/Electronic Songs (Billboard)	33
