= Museum of Love =

American dance-punk band

- Origin: Brooklyn, New York, United States
- Genres: Dance-punk, electronic rock, electronica, alternative dance, alternative rock
- Years active: 2013–present
- Label: DFA Records
- Members: Pat Mahoney; Dennis McNany
- Website: http://www.museumoflove.net/

Museum of Love is an American band formed by LCD Soundsystem drummer Pat Mahoney together with Dennis McNany. Their first song "Down South" was released in July 2013, followed by "Monotronic" in October 2013. Their first full-length album was released on October 14, 2014, by DFA Records. The duo released a new song "Marching Orders", their first in four years, in November 2018. They released another new song called "Cluttered World" in March 2021.

Their second studio album, Life of Mammals, was released on July 9, 2021.

== Discography ==
- Patrick Mahoney and Dennis McNany a.k.a. Museum of Love of "Dross Glop 4" remix of "My Machines" by Battles feat Gary Numan (April 21, 2012) Warp Records
- "Down South" digital release (July 2013) DFA Records
- "Monotronic" digital release (October 2013) DFA Records
- "Dingbat" (featuring Museum Of Love) Shit Robot DFA Records
- Museum of Love LP (October 2014) DFA Records
- Museum Of Love "The Remixes" digital only DFA Records
- "Never Let It End" b/w Hardway Brothers Remix Limited Edition white label 12" DFA Records
- "Monotronic" b/w "Who's Who Of Who Cares" (Baldelli & Dionigi Remix) DFA Records
- Museum of Love remix of Zoé "Camara Lenta" (2015) Capitol Latin
- Museum of Love remix of Mark E "Midnight Equatic" from "Sky Horn EP" (2016) Public Release
- "What Follows" (featuring Museum of Love) Shit Robot / What Follows DFA Records
