= The DFA Remixes =

Remix album series by The DFA
- Released: 27 March & 3 October 2006
- Recorded: Unknown
- Genre: Dance-punk, electronica
- Length: 1:14:21
- Label: DFA Records
- Producer: The DFA

The DFA chronology
| DFA Holiday Mix 2005 (2005) | The DFA Remixes (2006) |

Alternative cover

Professional ratings
Aggregate scores
| Source | Rating |
|---|---|
| Metacritic | 87/100 (Chapter 1); 79/100 (Chapter 2) |
Review scores
| Source | Rating |
| AllMusic | (Chapter 1) (Chapter 2) |
| The A.V. Club | A (Chapter 1) |
| Alternative Press | (Chapter 1) (Chapter 2) |
| Entertainment Weekly | B+ (Chapter 1) |
| Mojo | (Chapter 1) |
| musicOMH | (Chapter 1) (Chapter 2) |
| Pitchfork | 8.2/10 (Chapter 1); 8.2/10 (Chapter 2) |
| PopMatters | 8/10 (Chapter 1); 7/10 (Chapter 2) |
| Stylus | B+ (Chapter 1); B– (Chapter 2) |
| Under the Radar | 8/10 (Chapter 1); 8/10 (Chapter 2) |

The DFA Remixes is a series of two remix compilations by influential dance-punk production duo The DFA (James Murphy and Tim Goldsworthy). Unlike previous DFA releases, these are remixes of other artists' work.

The first album in the series, Chapter One, was released on 27 March 2006 in the UK and 4 April 2006 in the US. The second album, Chapter Two, was released on the 2 October 2006 in the UK and 3 October in the US. The series was released on CD and vinyl with different track listings.

== Chapter One ==
=== CD ===
1. Le Tigre – "Deceptacon" - 6:23
2. Blues Explosion – "Mars, Arizona" - 10:42
3. The Chemical Brothers – "The Boxer" - 9:36
4. Soulwax – "Another Excuse" - 7:58
5. Radio 4 – "Dance To The Underground" - 9:02
6. Fischerspooner – "Emerge" - 4:16
7. Gorillaz – "Dare" - 12:11
8. Metro Area – "Orange Alert" - 5:41
9. Hot Chip – "(Just Like We) Breakdown" - 8:32

=== Vinyl ===
- A. Gorillaz - "Dare" - 12:11
- B. Radio 4 - "Dance To The Underground" - 9:02
- C1. Le Tigre - "Deceptacon" - 6:23
- C2. Metro Area - "Orange Alert" - 5:41
- D. Blues Explosion - "Mars, Arizona" - 10:42

== Chapter Two ==
=== CD ===
1. Tiga - "Far From Home"
2. Junior Senior - "Shake Your Coconuts"
3. Hot Chip - "Colours"
4. N.E.R.D - "She Wants To Move"
5. Nine Inch Nails - "The Hand That Feeds"
6. Goldfrapp - "Slide In"
7. Chromeo - "Destination Overdrive"
8. UNKLE - "In A State"

=== 2x12" ===
A. Tiga - "Far From Home" Instrumental
B1. Junior Senior - "Shake Your Coconuts"
B2. Chromeo - "Destination Overdrive"
C. Goldfrapp - "Slide In" Instrumental
D. UNKLE - "In A State"
