= Nils Bech =

Norwegian singer

Nils Bech (born 8 April 1981 in Hønefoss) is a Norwegian singer, signed to James Murphy's DFA Records. Bech became famous for performing a classic Christmas anthem O Holy Night for the Norwegian TV series Skam. His version of O Holy Night received more than 1 million of streams on Spotify on the day it was published, placing him in the top of the global charts.

== Early life ==
Bech was raised in a small Norwegian village outside Oslo and began performing at a very young age when he was singing at the Salvation Army for his grandmother and her friends. At age 10, he began singing classical music and continued to do so until early 20s thinking he might do a career as an Opera singer but later moved to electropop.

== Career ==
In 2017 Bech presented a show telling the story of his life, it was shown in Norway Opera and Ballet. He has also appeared in several theater plays including Oslo's National Theater's version of Shakespeare's Richard III where he played a singing Lord Richmond. A scene between Lady Anne and Richard was recorded for Bech's music video "Please stay".

He is a frequent guest at events hosted by Norwegian royal family. On 7 April 2017 Bech, together with Norwegian ballet dancer Silas Henriksen, performed "A Sudden Sickness" at the celebration of 80th birthday of Queen Sonja, and on 29 August 2018, again with Silas Henriksen, he was seen in the Oslo Cathedral at the ceremony of the 50th anniversary of King and Queen of Norway wedding performing his song "Thank You". The song tells a story of his grandmother meeting his boyfriend, Bech told on Instagram.

In the past, Nils Bech has performed in the New Museum in New York and at the Venice Biennale

== Personal life ==
Bech is openly gay.

== Discography ==
=== Albums ===
- 2010: Look Back
- 2012: Look Inside
- 2014: One Year
- 2016: Echo
- 2020: Foolish Heart
