= Soft (Dan Bodan album) =

Studio album by Dan Bodan
- Released: October 27, 2014
- Recorded: Berlin
- Genre: Electronic
- Length: 40:40
- Label: DFA Records
- Producer: Dan Bodan, Physical Therapy, Ville Haimala, 18+, Stadium, M.E.S.H.

Soft is an album by Dan Bodan released by DFA Records on 27 October 2014.

== Track listing ==
All tracks by Dan Bodan except "For Heaven's Sake (Let's Fall in Love)" by Bodan, Elise Bretton, Sherman Edwards

1. "A Soft Opening" – 3:41
2. "Anonymous" – 4:32
3. "Romeo" – 4:30
4. "Soft as Rain" – 3:52
5. "For Heaven's Sake (Let's Fall in Love)" – 4:30
6. "Reload" – 3:52
7. "Jaws of Life" – 4:09
8. "Rusty" – 4:12
9. "Catching Fire" – 4:23
10. "Goodtime Summer" – 2:58

Professional ratings
Aggregate scores
Source	Rating
Metacritic	64/100
Review scores
Source	Rating
AllMusic	3/5 stars
The Irish Times	4/5 stars
Loud and Quiet	7/10
musicOMH	3/5 stars
Pitchfork Media	6.2/10
The Skinny	3/5 stars
Tiny Mix Tapes	3/5 marks
Wondering Sound	3.5/5 stars
