= The Days of Mars =

Studio album by Delia Gonzalez & Gavin Russom
- Released: October 10, 2005
- Genres: Ambient, Electronica
- Label: DFA Records
- Producer: The DFA

Professional ratings
Review scores
Source	Rating
MusicOMH.com	Positive
Pitchfork Media	7.6/10
Stylus Magazine	A−

The Days of Mars is the debut album from artists Delia Gonzalez & Gavin Russom. It was released on October 10, 2005.

All the music was created by layering live takes of custom built synthesizers and other instruments.

== Track listing ==
1. Rise (12:55)
2. 13 Moons (11:15)
3. Relevée (13:32)
4. Black Spring (12:57)
