= Shit Robot =

Irish musician and DJ (born 1971)

Marcus Lambkin
- Born: Dublin, Ireland
- Genres: Techno, house
- Occupation(s): DJ, producer, songwriter
- Years active: 1992–present
- Labels: DFA Records
- Website: Shit Robot

Marcus Lambkin (born 1971), better known by the pseudonym Shit Robot, is an Irish electronic musician and DJ.

== Career ==
While working as a DJ in New York in 2000, he befriended James Murphy, later of LCD Soundsystem, and started a DJ partnership with him. Lambkin moved to rural Germany in 2004 and started producing his own music, with a number of releases on DFA Records from 2006. He released his debut album From the Cradle to the Rave in September 2010 to positive reviews from Entertainment.ie and NME. The album features contributions from Alexis Taylor of Hot Chip and James Murphy, amongst others.

== Discography ==
=== Albums ===
- From the Cradle to the Rave (DFA Records, 2010)
- We Got a Love (DFA Records, 2014)
- What Follows (DFA Records, 2016)

=== EPs ===
- 5 Songs (DFA Records, 2023)

=== Singles ===
- "Wrong Galaxy" (DFA Records, 2006)
- "Chasm" (DFA Records, 2007)
- "Simple Things (Work It Out)" (DFA Records, 2009)
- "I Got a Feeling" (DFA Records, 2010)
- "Take Em Up" (DFA Records, 2010)
- "Tuff Enuff" (DFA Records, 2010)
- "Losing My Patience" (DFA Records, 2011)
- "Teenage Bass" (DFA Records, 2012)
- "Feels Real" (DFA Records, 2013)
- "We Got a Love" (featuring Reggie Watts, split single with The Juan Maclean) (DFA Records, 2013)
- "Do That Dance" (DFA Records, 2014)
- "Do It (Right)" (DFA Records, 2014)
- "Where It's At" (DFA Records, 2015)
- "OB-8" (DFA Records, 2016)
- "Lose Control" (DFA Records, 2016)
- "Cubed / Rotation" (Me Me Me, 2018)
- "No Cigar" (DFA Records, 2025)
