= Holy Ghost! (album) =

Studio album by Holy Ghost!
- Released: April 1, 2011
- Genres: Synthpop; nu-disco; indietronica; alternative dance
- Length: 49:15
- Label: DFA
- Producer: Holy Ghost!

Holy Ghost! chronology
Static on the Wire (2010)	Holy Ghost! (2011)	Dynamics (2013)

Singles from Holy Ghost!
- 1. "Do It Again" Released: January 25, 2011; 2. "Wait & See" Released: May 10, 2011; 3. "Hold My Breath" Released: October 24, 2011; 4. "It's Not Over" Released: January 24, 2012

Professional ratings
Aggregate scores
Source	Rating
Metacritic	69/100
Review scores
Source	Rating
AllMusic	3.5/5 stars
Consequence of Sound	4/5 stars
Los Angeles Times	3.5/4 stars
The New York Times	favorable
NME	7/10
Paste	6.8/10
Pitchfork Media	7.1/10
PopMatters	6/10
Rolling Stone	3.5/5 stars
Slant Magazine	2.5/5 stars

Holy Ghost! is the first studio album by the electronic band Holy Ghost!. It was released in 2011 through DFA Records.

== Track listing ==
All lyrics are written by Alex Frankel; all music is composed by Holy Ghost!.

No.	Title	Length
1.	"Do It Again"	4:13
2.	"Wait and See"	3:39
3.	"Hold My Breath"	3:56
4.	"Say My Name"	6:33
5.	"Jam for Jerry"	4:45
6.	"Hold On"	5:56
7.	"It's Not Over"	4:09
8.	"Slow Motion"	3:47
9.	"Static on the Wire"	6:26
10.	"Some Children" (featuring Michael McDonald)	5:52

US iTunes Store bonus tracks
No.	Title	Length
11.	"Wait & See" (Flight Facilities Remix)	5:19
12.	"Say My Name" (Eli Escobar Remix)	8:09

== Charts ==
Chart (2011)	Peak position
US Dance/Electronic Albums	11
US Heatseekers Albums	11

== Release history ==
Region	Date	Format	Label
Australia	April 1, 2011	Digital download	Shock Records
Germany	April 1, 2011	Digital download	Cooperative Music
United Kingdom	April 1, 2011	Digital download	Cooperative Music
United States	April 4, 2011	Digital download	DFA Records
United Kingdom	April 11, 2011	CD	Cooperative Music
Australia	April 22, 2011	CD	Shock Records
United States	April 26, 2011	CD	DFA Records
Germany	April 29, 2011	CD; LP	Cooperative Music
