= Dynamics (album) =

Studio album by Holy Ghost!
- Released: September 3, 2013
- Recorded: 2012–13; 361 South 4th Street, Plantain NYC (Brooklyn, New York City)
- Genre: Synthpop; nu-disco; indietronica; alternative dance
- Length: 49:39
- Label: DFA
- Producer: Holy Ghost!

Holy Ghost! chronology
Holy Ghost! (2011)	Dynamics (2013)	Work for Hire (2015)

Singles from Dynamics
- 1. "Dumb Disco Ideas" Released: May 14, 2013

Dynamics is the second studio album by American synthpop duo Holy Ghost!. It was released on September 3, 2013, by DFA Records. The album was preceded by the single "Dumb Disco Ideas" on May 14, 2013. The album's cover features the image "Strong in Love" by American painter and sculptor Robert Longo.

Professional ratings
Aggregate scores
Source	Rating
Metacritic	63/100
Review scores
Source	Rating
AllMusic	3.5/5 stars
Consequence of Sound	2.5/5 stars
Drowned in Sound	7/10
Pitchfork Media	6.3/10
Rolling Stone	3/5 stars
Slant Magazine	1/5 stars
This Is Fake DIY	4/5 stars

== Track listing ==
All tracks are written by Alex Frankel and Nick Millhiser, except "1 for Edgar" and "I Wanna Be Your Hand" by Frankel, Millhiser and Surahn Sidhu.

No.	Title	Length
1.	"Okay"	4:33
2.	"Dumb Disco Ideas"	8:03
3.	"Changing of the Guard"	3:24
4.	"Dance a Little Closer"	4:24
5.	"It Must Be the Weather"	6:15
6.	"1 for Edgar"	1:16
7.	"I Wanna Be Your Hand"	4:13
8.	"Bridge and Tunnel"	4:17
9.	"Don't Look Down"	5:24
10.	"In the Red"	2:19
11.	"Cheap Shots"	5:31

== Personnel ==
Credits adapted from the liner notes of Dynamics.

Holy Ghost!

- Holy Ghost! – engineering, mixing, production
- Alex Frankel – vocals (all tracks); CS-80 (1, 2, 5, 8–11); DX7 (1, 8, 10); clavinet (2); Roland VP-330 (2, 8, 9); Omnichord, Polyensemble (3); piano (3, 5); percussion (4, 5); OB-8, Taurus, TR-66 (5); Emulator (5, 9); D-50, MS-20 (6, 7); Wurlitzer (8); Jupiter-8, Rhodes (8, 10); Paraphonic (9); Prophet-5 (10)
- Nicholas Millhiser – CS-60, piano, SH-101 (1); guitar (1–3, 6–9, 11); modular synthesizer (1, 2, 9, 10); DX7 (1, 4, 5); Taurus (1, 6, 7); CS-80 (1–7, 9, 11); 808 (1, 10); percussion (2); drums (2–8, 11); bass (2, 3, 6–8); RS-09, Wurlitzer (3); Jupiter-8 (3, 5, 9, 11); Rogue (4); Emulator (5, 11); Rhodes (6, 7); Mellotron (8, 9); MG-1, Prophet '08 (8, 11); LM-1 (9, 10)

Additional personnel

- Greg Calbi – mastering
- John Furrisky – violin (8)
- Ben Grubin – backing vocals (4)
- Kosuke Kasza – guitar (5, 10)
- Sheila Lamont – cello (8)
- Robert Longo – cover image
- Chris Maher – backing vocals (1, 2, 4)
- Rachael Millkey – additional art direction, production design
- Alan Palomo – backing vocals (11)
- Kelley Polar – viola (8)
- Surahn Sidhu – backing vocals (6, 7)
- Matt Thornley – musical assistance
- Michael Vadino – art direction, design
- Nancy Whang – backing vocals (2–4, 8, 9)
- Chris Zane – mixing

== Charts ==
Chart (2013)	Peak position
US Dance/Electronic Albums	8
US Heatseekers Albums	20

== Release history ==
Region	Date	Format	Label
United States	September 3, 2013	CD	DFA Records
Germany	September 6, 2013	Digital download	DFA Records
United Kingdom	September 6, 2013	Digital download	DFA Records
United States	September 9, 2013	Digital download	DFA Records
Australia	September 13, 2013	CD; digital download	[PIAS] Australia
United States	September 17, 2013	LP	DFA Records
United Kingdom	October 7, 2013	CD; LP	DFA Records
Germany	October 11, 2013	LP	[PIAS] Cooperative
Germany	October 18, 2013	CD	[PIAS] Cooperative
France	October 21, 2013	CD	[PIAS] Recordings
