= Mock & Toof =

British electronic music act

- Origin: London, United Kingdom
- Genres: Dance, electronic
- Years active: 2005–present
- Labels: Tiny Sticks
- Members: Duncan Stump; Nick Woolfson
- Website: www.facebook.com/mockandtoof

Mock & Toof are a British electronic music act formed by Duncan Stump and Nick Woolfson. The duo have released two acclaimed albums, Tuning Echoes (2010) and Temporary Happiness (2012). They have also released music on DFA Records, Mule Music, and RVNG Intl. Mock & Toof have provided remixes for the likes of Hot Chip, The Scissor Sisters, Maps, Miss Kittin, Zero 7, Groove Armada & Friendly Fires.

== Discography ==
=== Releases ===
- "Lycra Virgin / Tight Humps" (Empty Edits · 2006)
- "Black Jub" (Tiny Sticks · 2007)
- "Digits" (Rvng Intl · 2007)
- "Zomby" (Mule Musiq · 2007 )
- "K Choppers"/"Brownbred" (DFA · 2007)
- "Beat Up"/"Lucky" (Tiny Sticks · 2008)
- "Big Hands For A Lady" (M&T Inc · 2008)
- "K Choppers"/"Brownbred" Remixes (Tiny Sticks · 2008)
- "Underwater" (DFA · 2008)
- "Smit Smot" (M&T Inc · 2009)
- "Farewell To Wendo" (Tiny Sticks/M&T Inc - 2010)
- "Tuning Echoes" (Tiny Sticks/M&T Inc - 2010) - Album
- "Suppress Your Feelings"/"Shoeshine Boogie" (Tiny Sticks/M&T Inc - 2010)
- "Norman's Eyes" (Tiny Sticks/M&T Inc - 2010)
- "The Key" (Tiny Sticks/M&T Inc - 2010)
- "My Head" (Tiny Sticks/M&T Inc - 2012)
- "Temporary Happiness" (Tiny Sticks/M&T Inc - 2012) - Album
- "Walking The Streets" (Tiny Sticks/M&T Inc - 2013)
- "Remixed Vol. 1" (Tiny Sticks/M&T Inc - 2013)
- "Remixed Vol. 2" (Tiny Sticks/M&T Inc - 2013)
- "Temporary Echoes" (Tiny Sticks/M&T Inc - 2013) - Compilation

=== Remixes ===
- The Juan Maclean "Love Is In The Air" Mock & Toof Remix (DFA · 2006)
- Wekan "Skid" Mock & Toof Remix (Back Yard · 2006)
- Dondolo "Tetanus Crisis" Mock & Toof Remix (Tiny Sticks · 2006)
- Hot Chip "Over and Over" Mock & Toof Dub (EMI/DFA · 2006)
- Nufrequency feat. Plavka "Love Sick" Mock & Toof Remix (Rebirth · 2007)
- Strangelets "Riot On Planet 10" Mock & Toof Remix (Supersoul Records · 2007)
- The Scissor Sisters "She's My Man" Mock & Toof Remix (White Diet/Polydor · 2007)
- Box Codax "Rat Boy" Mock & Toof Remix (Gomma · 2007)
- Maps "It Will Find You" Mock & Toof Remix (Mute Records · 2007)
- Kissogram "My Friend Is A Seahorse" Mock & Toof Remix (Defdrive · 2007)
- Friendly Fires "Photobooth" Mock & Toof Remix (People In the Sky · 2007)
- Sia "Day Too Soon" Mock & Toof Remix (I.E. Music · 2007)
- Spektrum "Mirror Man" Mock & Toof Remix (Start Stop · 2007)
- Plej "Borderline" Mock & Toof Remix (Exceptional · 2008)
- Ladyhawke "Back Of The Van" Mock & Toof Remix (Modular · 2008)
- Mariem Hassan "Magat Milkitna Dulaa" Mock & Toof Remix (Mo'Zik · 2008)
- Holy Ghost! "Hold On" Mock & Toof Remixes (DFA · 2008)
- Hot Chip "Hold On"/"Touch Too Much" Mock & Toof Remix (EMI · 2008)
- Loin Brothers "Heavy Helmet" Mock & Toof Remix (Future Classic · 2009)
- Groove Armada "I Won't Kneel" (Cooking Vinyl · 2009)
- Pollyester "The Indian" (Permanent Vacation · 2009)
- Zero 7 "Zizou" Mock & Toof (Atlantic · 2010)
- Lauer "Delta NRG" (Permanent Vacation · 2010)
- Clap Rules "Fantasmi" (Bear Funk · 2012)
- Miss Kittin "Come Into My House" (wSphere · 2013)
