= Prinzhorn Dance School (album) =

Studio album by Prinzhorn Dance School
- Released: August 13, 2007 (UK); August 28, 2007(US)
- Genre: Alternative
- Label: DFA Records
- Producers: Prinzhorn Dance School, The DFA

Professional ratings
Review scores
Source	Rating
Allmusic	link
The Guardian	or link
LAist	Positive link
Pitchfork Media	8.2/10 link
Stranger (magazine)	Positive link
The Times	link

Prinzhorn Dance School is the eponymous debut album by British alternative rock band Prinzhorn Dance School. It was released on August 13, 2007, in the UK and August 28 in North America.

The album was recorded in a National Trust cottage in Devon and a barn in Sussex, before being mixed in New York City with the DFA.

== Track listing ==
1. "Black Bunker"
2. "Do You Know Your Butcher?"
3. "Worker"
4. "Don't Talk To Strangers"
5. "Hamworthy Sports & Leisure Centre"
6. "You Are The Space Invader"
7. "Eat, Sleep"
8. "I Do Not Like Change"
9. "Lawyers Water Jug"
10. "Realer, Pretender"
11. "No Books"
12. "Up! Up! Up!"
13. "Crackerjack Docker"
14. "See M Dahlia"
15. "Crash, Crash, Crash"
16. "Spaceman In Your Garden"
