= Pixeltan =

- Origin: Brooklyn, NY, United States
- Genres: Noise-rock; Indie electronic
- Years active: 2001 – present
- Labels: DFA
- Members: Mika Yoneta; Devin Flynn; Hisham Bharoocha
- Website: Official MySpace

Pixeltan are a Brooklyn based noise rock/electronic band consisting of Mika Yoneta (vocals/keyboard), Devin Flynn (bass/percussion), and Hisham Bharoocha (drums/electronics). They are signed to DFA Records. Pitchfork praised the "power and movement" of their self-titled EP.

== Discography ==
- Pixeltan EP 12" - Troubleman Unlimited (2001)
- Get Up/Say What 12" - DFA Records (2004)
- Pixeltan - DFA Records (2009)
