= Holy Ghost! =

American synthpop duo

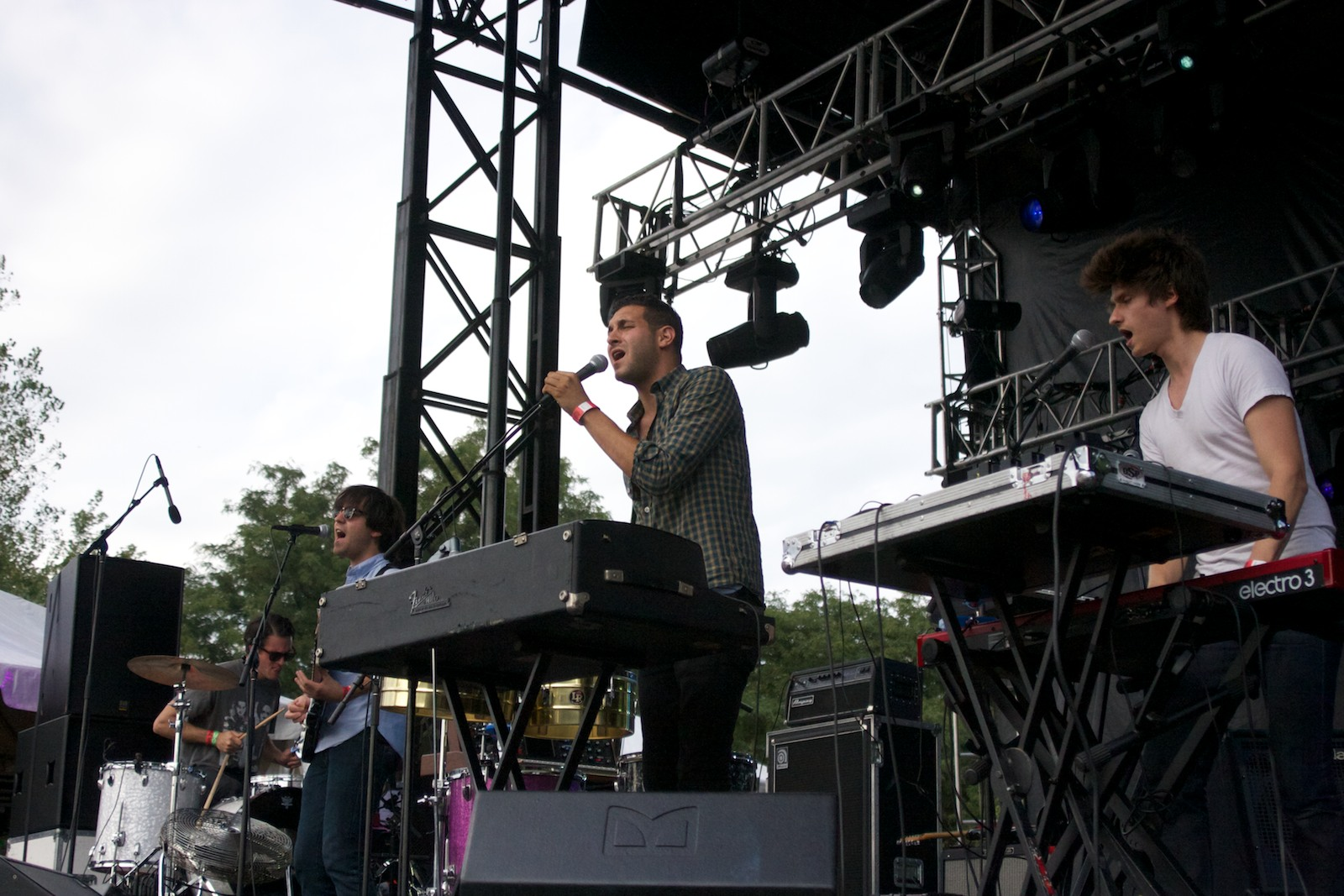
- Holy Ghost! performing at North Coast Music Festival in Chicago, September 5, 2010

Background information
- Origin: Brooklyn, New York, U.S.
- Genres: Synthpop; nu-disco; indietronica; alternative dance
- Years active: 2007–2019
- Labels: DFA; West End
- Members: Nick Millhiser; Alex Frankel
- Website: www.holyghostnyc.net (inactive)

Holy Ghost! were an American synthpop duo from Brooklyn, New York City. Founded in 2007, the duo consisted of Nick Millhiser and Alex Frankel.

== History ==
Millhiser and Frankel both grew up on the Upper West Side of New York City and attended Trevor Day School together. They were later part of a hip hop group called Automato. Automato's debut album was produced by James Murphy and Tim Goldsworthy of DFA. According to Frankel, after the release of the album, Automato "kind of fell apart". Millhiser and Frankel kept working on music, their collaboration having already begun moving towards the alternative dance genre.

The name Holy Ghost! was selected just before the pressing of their debut single "Hold On" in November 2007. The single was described by Resident Advisor as "one of the dirtiest little Italo tunes you're likely to hear this year".

The duo continued to work on various remixes for the likes of Moby, Cut Copy and MGMT. Their second single, "I Will Come Back" was initially released in conjunction with Mountain Dew's Green Label Sound record label. A video was made for the single that is a shot-for-shot remake of New Order's "Confusion" video, including Arthur Baker reprising his role from the original. The song was later included on the Static on the Wire EP, released on the 18 May 2010. The duo also began to play live, starting with a tour with label mates LCD Soundsystem.

The duo's self-titled debut album was released on April 2, 2011. Their second album, Dynamics, was released on September 3, 2013. The duo's second extended play, Crime Cutz, was released on April 29, 2016. Their third album, Work, was released on June 21, 2019.

== Discography ==
=== Albums ===
- Holy Ghost! (2011)
- Dynamics (2013)
- Work (2019)

=== Extended plays ===
- Static on the Wire (2010)
- Crime Cutz (2016)

=== Mix albums ===
- The Remixes Vol. 1 (2009)
- Work for Hire (2015)

=== Singles ===
Title	Year	Album
"Hold On"	2007	Non-album single
"I Will Come Back"	2009	Static on the Wire
"Hold On"/"On Board" (Friendly Fires vs Holy Ghost!)	2010	Non-album single
"Say My Name"	2010	Static on the Wire
"Do It Again"	2011	Holy Ghost!
"Wait & See"	2011	Holy Ghost!
"Hold My Breath"	2011	Holy Ghost!
"I Wanted to Tell Her"	2011	Non-album single
"It's Not Over"	2012	Holy Ghost!
"It Gets Dark"	2012	Non-album single
"Dumb Disco Ideas"	2013	Dynamics
"Teenagers in Heat"	2013	Non-album single
"Okay"	2013	Dynamics
"Bridge & Tunnel"	2014	Dynamics
"Crime Cutz"	2016	Crime Cutz
"Anxious"	2018	Work
"Epton on Broadway (Part I & Part II)"	2019	Work
"Escape from Los Angeles"	2019	Work

== Remixes ==
- 2007: "Goblin City" by Panthers
- 2007: "Spectacle Wins" by Only Fools and Horses
- 2007: "Hearts on Fire" by Cut Copy
- 2008: "I Love to Move in Here" by Moby
- 2008: "Business Acumen" by In Flagranti
- 2008: "Moon Song" by They Came from the Stars I Saw Them
- 2008: "I Can See" by Jazzanova featuring Ben Westbeech
- 2008: "Of Moons, Birds and Monsters" by MGMT
- 2009: "Lisztomania" by Phoenix
- 2009: "The Deep End" by Curses!
- 2009: "The Pretender" by Datarock
- 2009: "I Can See" by Jazzanova
- 2010: "Drunk Girls" by LCD Soundsystem
- 2010: "Love Get Out of My Way" by Monarchy
- 2010: "Somebody to Love Me" by Mark Ronson and the Business Intl
- 2010: "The Deep End" by Curses!
- 2011: "Drop Me a Line" by Midnight Magic
- 2011: "Blue Moon" by Moby
- 2013: "Working the Midnight Shift" by Donna Summer
- 2018: "Control (Secretly Sorry)" by JR JR

== Members ==
- Nick Millhiser
- Alex Frankel

=== Touring members ===
- Chris Maher – guitar, percussion, background vocals (2010–present)
- Erik Tonnesen – synthesizers, background vocals (2010–present)
- Sam Jones – synthesizers, percussion, background vocals (2011–present)
- Chris Berry - drums (2014–present)
- Jim Orso – drums, background vocals (2011–2014)
