= Delia Gonzalez (musician) =

American musician

Delia Gonzalez is an American musician.

== Discography ==
- The Days of Mars (2005)
- Track Five 12" (2010)
