= Prinzhorn Dance School =

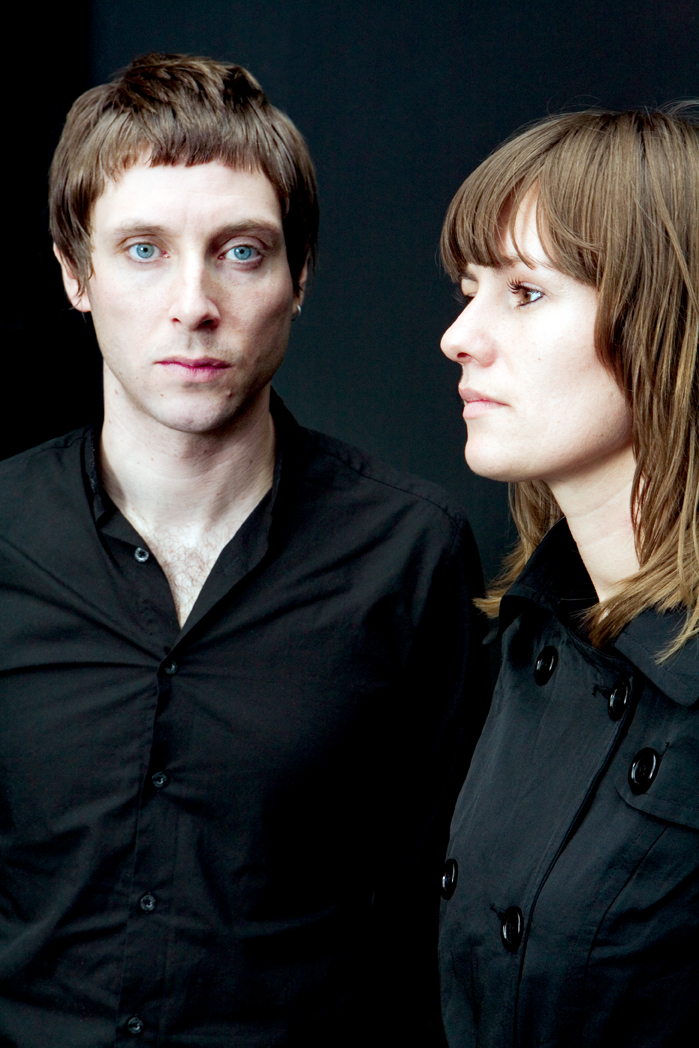
- Prinz, left, with Horn, right

Background information
- Origin: Portsmouth/Reading, England
- Genres: Alternative, post-punk
- Years active: 2006-present
- Label: DFA Records
- Members: Suzi Horn (vocals, bass); Tobin Prinz (vocals, guitar); Chris Boseley (guitar, live only)
- Website: Official website

Prinzhorn Dance School is an English musical duo, which consists of Tobin Prinz and Suzi Horn. The duo were originally based in Brighton and Portsmouth and made their debut in 2007. The group is named for Dr. Hans Prinzhorn, who collected art by mentally ill patients under his care.

== Biography ==
In 2006 Prinz and Horn signed a recording contract with the New York record label DFA Records. Their debut release for the label was a self-recorded and self-produced 7-inch single featuring the tracks "You Are The Space Invader" and "Eat, Sleep".

== Live performances ==
They have thus far completed UK and European tour dates. The debut album was toured with a three-piece line-up (with the addition of a drummer). However, in August 2008 they headlined the Experimental Circle Tent at Offset Festival bringing the event to a close as a 2-piece (using a specially modified shared drumkit), the first time they have performed without a separate drummer. They retained this live formation for recent shows in Luxembourg, Istanbul, Bucharest and Lausanne.

== Recycling clause ==
Negotiations with EMI (who licensed the debut album in the UK) were protracted while the band insisted upon the inclusion of special recycling clauses, ensuring that all their record sleeves, CD sleeves and promotional material be produced using recycled materials. All releases to date have used recycled paperstock.

== In popular media ==
In 2008 their song "You Are The Space Invader" was used as the soundtrack to the HBO Cinemax trailer for the Transformers movie.

In 2007 The Sunday Telegraph included Prinzhorn Dance School's debut album in a "best 120 albums of all time" list.

In 2010 a poster of the Prinzhorn Dance School album can be seen in the movie Greenberg. DFA Records boss James Murphy was responsible for the soundtrack.

== Discography ==
=== Albums ===
- Prinzhorn Dance School (DFA Records, 2007)
- Clay Class (DFA, 2012)
- Home Economics (DFA, 2015)

=== Singles ===
- "You Are The Space Invader"/"Eat, Sleep" (original recording - image on white sleeve) - 7" single (DFA Records · 2006)
- "Up! Up! Up!"/"Hamworthy Sports and Leisure Centre" - 7" single (DFA Records · 2007)
- "Crackerjack Docker" - (DFA Records · 2007)
- "You Are The Space Invader" (album version - image on black sleeve) - 7" / 12" / CD single (DFA Records · 2007)
- "Seed, Crop, Harvest" - (DFA Records · 2010)
- "Split 7" with the Brian James Gang - (DFA records . 2013)
