= Automato =

American hip hop group

- Origin: Brooklyn, New York
- Genres: Alternative hip hop Rap rock
- Years active: 1995–2000s
- Labels: Coup de grâce
- Members: Nick Millhiser; Jesse Levine; Morgan Wiley; Andrew Raposo; Alex Frankel; Ben Fries

Automato was a Brooklyn, New York-based hip hop sextet formed in 1995. Its members were Nick Millhiser (drums), Jesse Levine (vocals), Morgan Wiley (guitar), Andrew Raposo (bass), Alex Frankel (keyboards), and Ben Fries (vocals). All six of its members are from New York City except for Wiley, who was born in Lagos, Nigeria and moved to Las Vegas, Nevada in his youth. Their admiration of multiple artists from disparate genres led them to DFA Records' Tim Goldsworthy and James Murphy. The group released their self-titled debut album on the Coup de grâce label in 2004, and it was produced by Goldsworthy and Murphy (d/b/a/ DFA). According to Frankel, the group "kind of fell apart" soon after releasing their debut album.

== Critical reception ==
Automato received generally favorable reviews from music critics, and prompted some to describe them as "the Radiohead of hip-hop" because of their frequent experimentation in their music. For example, Robert Christgau gave the album an A− grade, describing its music as "Less accomplished and sensational than the Rapture’s." He also wrote that the album's music is "a lot trippier when it comes together and also when it threatens to jump the tracks, both of which happen plenty." On the other hand, Pitchfork Media's Rob Mitchum gave the album a rating of 3.5 out of 10, criticizing the band for their "indie-rap dullness, horrible cybernetic-produce bandname, and absolutely atrocious MC." Jason MacNeil of AllMusic gave the album 3.5 out of 5 stars, writing that "While not a terrific album, the good [on it] often outweighs the occasional filler."

== Discography ==
- Automato (Coup de grâce, 2004)
