= Gavilán Rayna Russom =

American musician (born 1974)

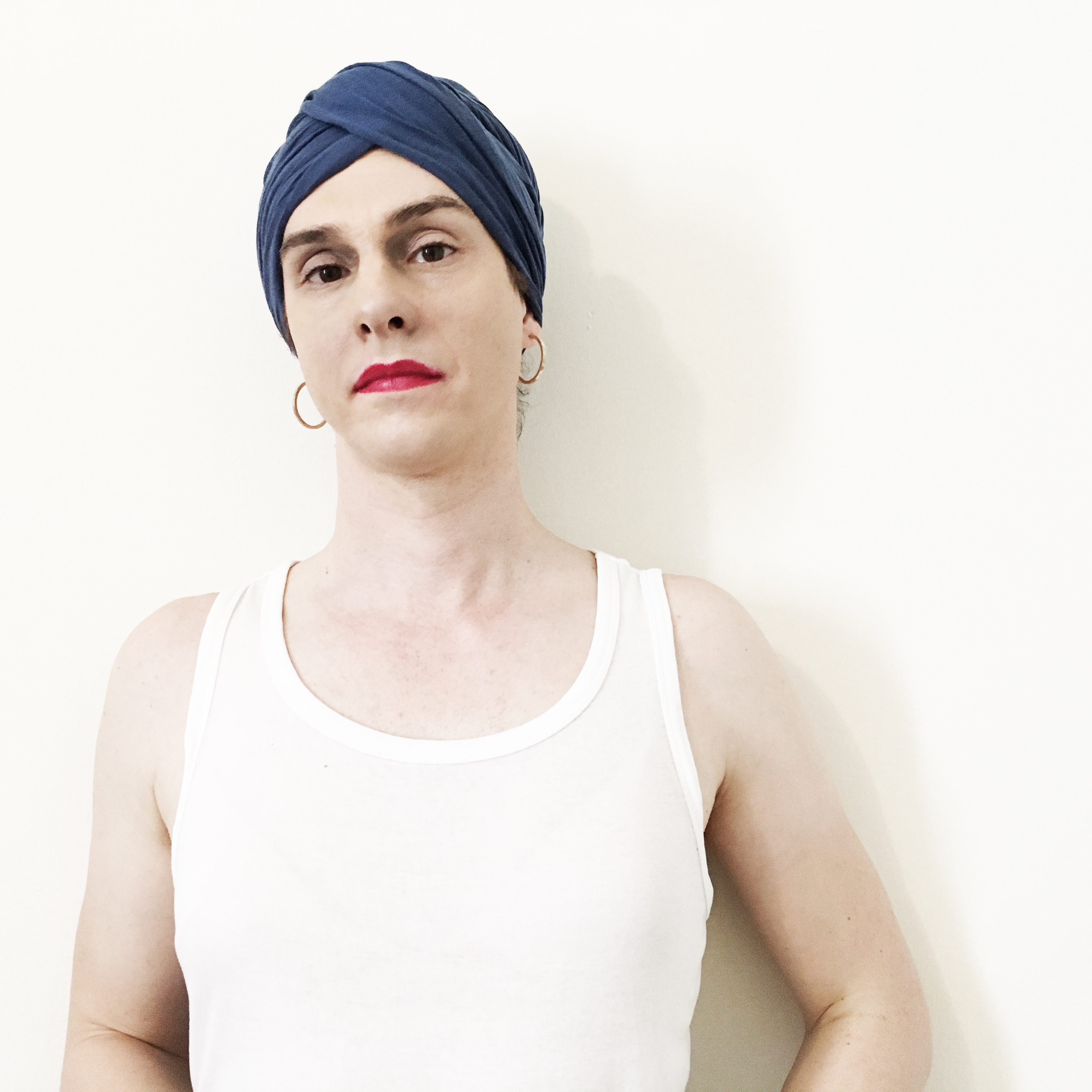
- Russom pictured in July 2017

Background information
- Also known as: Black Meteoric Star; The Crystal Ark
- Born: May 1, 1974 (age 52); Providence, Rhode Island, U.S.
- Genres: Electronica; house; ambient; dance-punk; nu-disco
- Occupations: Producer; DJ; illustrator
- Instruments: Synthesizer; percussion; vocals
- Years active: 1998–present
- Website: https://www.gavilanraynarussom.com

Gavilán Rayna Russom is an American electronic music producer, musician and DJ. Russom has released music under names including Black Leotard Front, Black Meteoric Star, Gavin Russom, and the Crystal Ark, as well as collaborative work with Delia Gonzalez and the band LCD Soundsystem. Russom is also a visual artist and a writer. Russom lives in New York City.

Central to Russom's aesthetic is the challenge of fixed ideas which surround gender and all of the social frameworks that accompany it. Known in the electronic community as "The Wizard" for her technical prowess, she has built instruments for the likes of James Murphy (LCD Soundsystem), Tim Goldsworthy (Unkle, the Loving Hand) and Bjorn Copeland (Black Dice).

== Biography ==
Russom was born in Providence, Rhode Island, in 1974. With an interest in music from an early age, she spent her teenage years exploring drone and feedback using tape loops and mixers and playing in psychedelic noise bands with Michael Kelley, and with Brian Chippendale (Lightning Bolt, Mindflayer). Russom went on to study computer music, theory, composition, and improvisation at Bard College from 1994 to 1996. A growing disillusionment with traditional compositional modes along with a move to New York in 1997 opened Russom's music to more experimental forms of expression. In 1998, her collaboration with Delia Gonzalez began, a project that would lead to a number of releases on DFA.

Russom moved to Berlin in 2004 where, inspired by that city's flourishing electronic music scene as well as Germany's history of psychedelic music, she produced three singles under the name Black Meteoric Star, which were collected and released as a self-titled LP in 2009. As of 2010, she had relocated to New York where she was producing music in various veins including in collaboration with Viva Ruiz as The Crystal Ark. Russom has also toured playing synths and percussion with LCD Soundsystem.

Russom came out publicly as transgender in an exclusive interview with Britt Julious on Pitchfork and in Into, an online publication run by Grindr, with a feature interview with Nico Lang published on July 6, 2017. Russom announced her first set DJing after coming out was at Femme's Room, "a popular monthly party celebrating femme and queer culture", on July 13, 2017, in Chicago, Illinois. In March 2020 Russom established the music label Voluminous Arts to support and disseminate works by boundary pushing artists.

== Discography ==
=== Albums ===
- The Days of Mars (as Gavin Russom; with Delia Gonzalez) (DFA, 2005)
- Black Meteoric Star (as Black Meteoric Star) (DFA, 2009)
- The Xecond Xoming of Black Meteoric Star (as Black Meteoric Star) (Nation, 2016)
- The Envoy (as Gavilán Rayna Russom) (Ecstatic, 2019)
- Disco (Voluminous Arts · 2020) (as Black Meteoric Star)
- Secret Passage (Voluminous Arts · March 2020) (as Gavilán Rayna Russom)
- Road Trip Tape Summer 2020 (Voluminous Arts · June 2020) (as Gavilán Rayna Russom)
- VOL009 RFNAL (Voluminous Arts · August 2020) (as Gavilán Rayna Russom)
- Transverberation (Voluminous Arts · November 2020) (as Gavilán Rayna Russom)
- Trans Feminist Symphonic Music (Voluminous Arts · February 2022) (as Gavilán Rayna Russom)
- Slabs Vol 1 (Voluminous Arts · March 2022) (as Gavilán Rayna Russom)

=== Singles ===
==== With Delia Gonzalez ====
- "El Monte" (DFA · 2003)
- "Casual Friday" (as Black Leotard Front) (DFA · 2004)
- "Relevee" (DFA · 2006) (featuring remixes by Carl Craig and Baby Ford)
- "Track Five" (DFA · 2010)

==== As Black Meteoric Star ====
- "Death Tunnel/World Eater" (DFA · 2009)
- "Dominatron/Anthem" (DFA · 2009)
- "Dream Catcher/Dawn" (DFA · 2009)

==== With The Crystal Ark ====
- "The City Never Sleeps" (DFA · 2010)
- "The Tangible Presence of the Miraculous" (DFA · 2010)
- "Touch" (DFA · 2011)
- "Tusk" (Just Tell Me That You Want Me (Fleetwood Mac tribute album), Hear Music · Released August 14, 2012)
- "The Crystal Ark" (DFA · 2012)

==== As Gavin Russom ====
- "Night Sky" (DFA · 2011)
- "The Purge / Enthroned" (Entropy Trax · 2014)
- "Psychic Decolonization" (Lux Rec · 2016)
