= The Juan MacLean =

American electronic musician

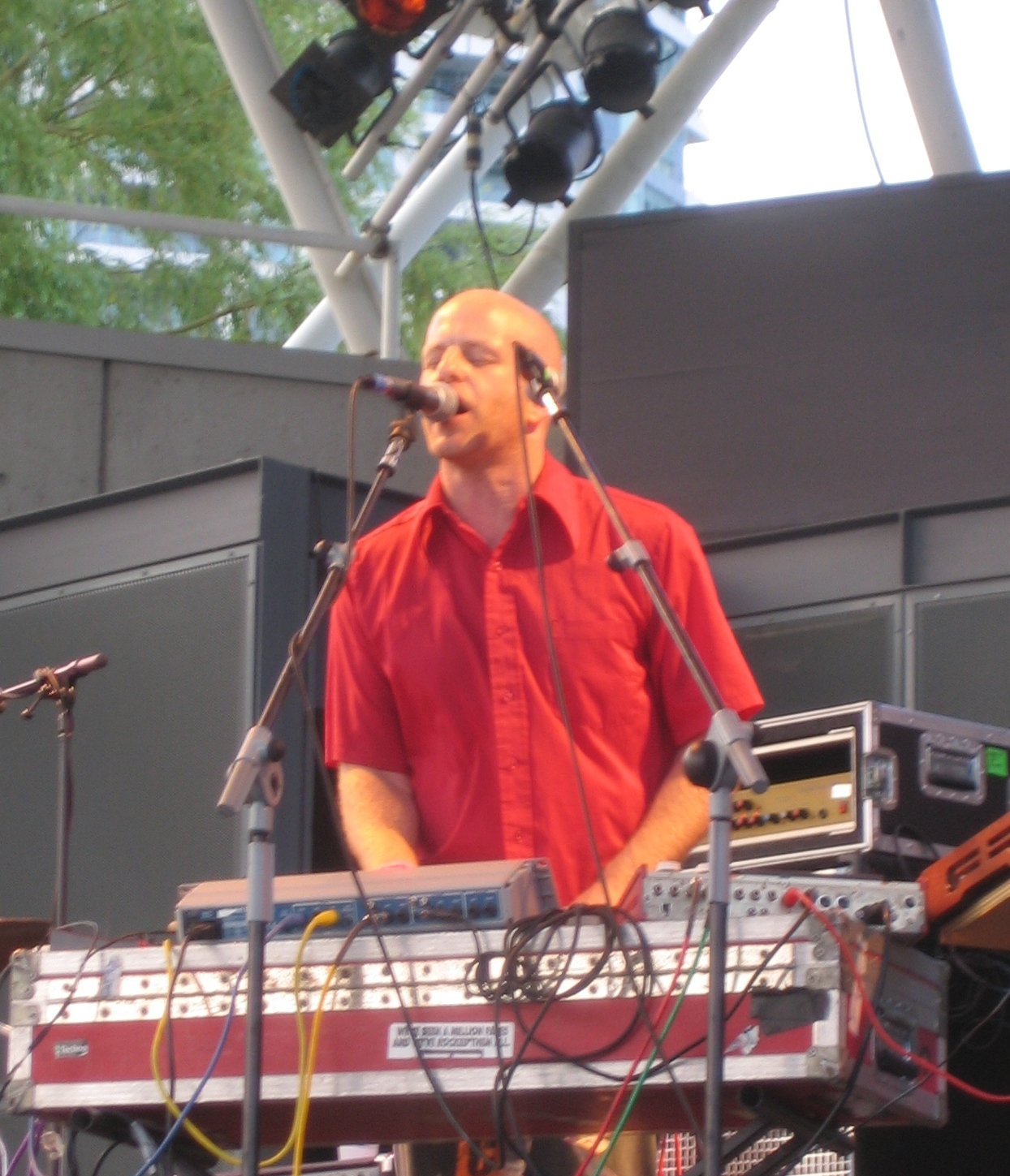
- John MacLean performing live in 2006

Background information
- Origin: United States
- Genres: Electronica, dance-punk, house, nu-disco
- Years active: 2002–present
- Label: DFA Records
- Members: John MacLean; Nancy Whang; Nicholas Millhiser (live)
- Past members: Eric Broucek; Jerry Fuchs
- Website: www.thejuanmaclean.com

John MacLean, better known by the stage name of the Juan MacLean, is an American electronic musician.

== History ==
MacLean was guitarist for the post-hardcore band Six Finger Satellite, based in Providence, Rhode Island. The band was struck by several tragedies, and MacLean eventually moved into production duties, utilizing his home studio in Providence (nicknamed "the Parlor"). Eventually James Murphy joined the band as sound engineer (where he became known for a punishing tour PA set up, which he nicknamed "Death From Above").

Eventually the band broke up, and MacLean spent several years out of the music business, getting a degree at the Providence College and teaching English in New Hampshire. He continued a friendship with Murphy, who moved to New York City and founded influential dance-punk label DFA Records and started LCD Soundsystem. Murphy urged MacLean to get back into music, and got MacLean experimenting with modern electronic mixing equipment; DFA would include several MacLean compositions on compilation records.

His first album on the label, Less Than Human, was released in July 2005.

MacLean toured America in 2006 in support of The DFA Remixes Chapter 2.

On videos for "Give Me Every Little Thing" and "Tito's Way", MacLean was joined by the group's tour drummer, the late Jerry Fuchs. Other touring members include Eric Broucek and Nicholas Millhiser, and "Dance With Me" features vocalist Nancy Whang of LCD Soundsystem. The video for "Give Me Every Little Thing" was directed by Ben Dickenson of Waverly Films. The video for "Tito's Way" was directed by Adam Levite as Associates in Science.

In March 2008, the Juan MacLean released the single "Happy House". This was followed by a tour with Australian band Cut Copy and label-mates Shocking Pinks. This was followed by another single called "One Day" and the album The Future Will Come on April 14, 2009.

"Happy House" was re-released in the summer of 2009. It was promoted with a video directed by the Wilderness featuring singer Nancy Whang and a collection of back-up dancers including members of other DFA bands.

On November 8, 2009, the band's live drummer, Jerry Fuchs, who also drummed for Maserati and !!!, died after falling down an elevator shaft.

In 2010, Juan released a DJ-Kicks Mix CD on !K7 Records.

In 2011 Juan MacLean began collaborating with singer Amy Douglas under the name Peach Melba. This new collaboration was for music considered "too 'housey' for proper Juan MacLean releases". The first single released was "Can't Let Go", which showed influences from classic Chicago house. In March 2013, the Juan MacLean released a new single called "You're My Destiny".

On 25 June 2014 on Pitchfork Media, the Juan MacLean announced a new album, In a Dream, and its release date, 16 September 2014.

== Discography ==
=== Albums ===
- Less Than Human – 9 August 2005
- Visitations – 12 June 2006 (digital only remix album)
- The Future Will Come – 20 April 2009
- DJ-Kicks – 2010
- Everybody Get Close – 2011 (digital only)
- In a Dream – 16 September 2014
- The Brighter The Light – 20 September 2019 (compilation album)

=== EPs ===
- Der Half-Machine 10" – 2005
- Find a Way Tour EP – 2008
- Happy House Remixes – 2009
- I Can't Explain – 2021
- I Want the Night – 2021 (with Monika Heidemann)

=== Singles ===
- "By the Time I Get to Venus" – 2002
- "You Can't Have It Both Ways" – 2002
- "Give Me Every Little Thing" – 2003 (split with the Rapture's "Killing")
- "Tito's Way" – 2005
- "Love Is in the Air" – 2006
- "Happy House" – 2008
- "The Simple Life" – 2008
- "One Day" – 2009
- "Feels So Good" – 2010
- "Can't Let Go" – 2011 (as Peach Melba)
- "You're My Destiny" – 2013
- "Feel Like Movin'" – 2013 (split with Shit Robot featuring Reggie Watts' "We Got a Love")
- "Get Down (with My Love)" – 2014
- "A Place Called Space" – 2014
- "A Simple Design" – 2014
- "Here I Am" – 2015
- "Can You Ever Really Know Somebody" – 2017
- "What Do You Feel Free About?" – 2018
- "Zone Non Linear" – 2019
