= Less Than Human (album) =

Studio album by the Juan MacLean
- Released: 9 August 2005
- Genres: Electronic, dance-punk
- Length: 46:48
- Label: DFA/EMI - dfaemi 2131cd (UK)
- Producers: The Juan MacLean, The DFA

The Juan MacLean chronology
Less Than Human (2005)	Visitations (2006)

Less Than Human is the first album by American electronic artist the Juan MacLean. It was released by DFA Records on August 9, 2005.

Professional ratings
Aggregate scores
Source	Rating
Metacritic	81/100
Review scores
Source	Rating
AllMusic	4/5 stars
Entertainment Weekly	A−
The Guardian	4/5 stars
Mojo	4/5 stars
NME	8/10
PopMatters	8/10
Q	3.5/5 stars
Spin	B+
Stylus	A−
Uncut	8/10

== Track listing ==
1. "AD 2003" – 2:03
2. "Shining Skinned Friend" – 4:27
3. "Give Me Every Little Thing" – 5:25
4. "Tito's Way" – 3:40
5. "Love Is in the Air" – 2:54
6. "In the Afternoon" – 1:52
7. "My Time Is Running Out" – 5:21
8. "Crush the Liberation" – 6:45
9. "Dance with Me" – 14:07

== Production notes ==
1. "AD 2003" (produced by the DFA with Juan MacLean)
2. "Shining Skinned Friend" (produced by the DFA with Juan MacLean)
  - Drums by Jerry Fuchs
  - Vocals by Juan MacLean
  - Additional vocals by Nancy Whang
3. "Give Me Every Little Thing" (produced by the DFA with Juan MacLean)
  - Vocals by James Murphy and Nancy Whang
  - Words by James Murphy
4. "Tito's Way" (produced by the DFA with Juan MacLean)
  - Drums by Nick Atocha
  - Words and vocals by Nancy Whang
  - Additional vocals by Juan MacLean
5. "Love Is in the Air" (produced by Juan MacLean)
6. "In the Afternoon" (produced by the DFA with Juan McLean)
  - Vocals by Juan MacLean and Nancy Whang
7. "My Time Is Running Out" (produced by the DFA with Juan McLean)
  - Vocals by Nancy Whang
8. "Crush the Liberation" (produced by the DFA with Juan McLean)
  - Vocals by Nancy Whang
  - Contains sample from "I Got My Mind Made Up" by Instant Funk
9. "Dance with Me" (produced by the DFA with Juan McLean)
  - Words and vocals by Nancy Whang
