= DFA Records =

American independent record label

- Founded: 2001
- Founder: Tim Goldsworthy; James Murphy; Jonathan Galkin
- Distributors: The Orchard (North America), Liberation Music (Australasia), PIAS Group (Rest of World)
- Genre: Indie rock; electronica; dance-punk; post-punk; dance
- Country of origin: U.S.
- Location: New York City
- Official website: dfarecords.com

DFA Records is an American independent record label based in New York City. It was founded in 2001 by musicians Tim Goldsworthy and James Murphy, and manager Jonathan Galkin. Goldsworthy and Murphy were formerly a production team called the DFA until Goldsworthy's relocation to the UK.

== History ==
Visual projections over DFA logo at a 2014 anniversary party in Los Angeles

James Murphy and Tim Goldsworthy met while working in New York on the David Holmes album Let's Get Killed. After the recording was completed, Goldsworthy stayed in New York, and the two began to throw parties on the Lower East Side. They created the production duo the DFA. After they met Jonathan Galkin, who subsequently quit his event-production job to work with James and Tim, they turned DFA into a label.

DFA Records began on a series of 12" single vinyl releases starting with The Rapture's "House of Jealous Lovers" and The Juan Maclean's "By the Time I Get to Venus". "House of Jealous Lovers" went on to sell 7500 copies. Many of the early releases of DFA's catalog were released in Europe through Trevor Jackson's Output Recordings. After completing production on The Rapture's debut full-length album Echoes, DFA began to shop around the album. Although The Rapture eventually signed to Universal Music Group, the DFA label secured a deal with EMI for distribution of its acts outside the United States, along with several distributors within the U.S.

Notable releases include the debut album of James Murphy's band LCD Soundsystem and its follow-ups Sound of Silver, This Is Happening and American Dream, and a number of compilation albums featuring artists such as the Rapture, the Juan Maclean, Black Dice, Shit Robot, Delia Gonzalez & Gavilán Rayna Russom (also as Black Leotard Front), J.O.Y., Pixeltan, and Hot Chip.

As a production team, the DFA have produced and remixed artists including Radio 4, Le Tigre, N.E.R.D., Soulwax, Blues Explosion, Nine Inch Nails, Automato, Gorillaz, UNKLE, and the Chemical Brothers. The DFA remix of M.I.A.'s "Paper Planes" appeared on A. R. Rahman's Academy Award-winning Slumdog Millionaire soundtrack. They spent an afternoon writing a song with Britney Spears, and were also approached by Janet Jackson to collaborate. The production duo effectively came to an end when Tim Goldsworthy left New York to return to his native UK. The label was primarily run by Jonathan Galkin and Kris Petersen.

=== Death From Abroad ===
In 2007 DFA Records started an imprint label titled Death From Abroad. This offshoot is used to release 12" singles by artists not based in North America, such as Mock & Toof and ALTZ. The imprint also released a CD compilation of tracks released on the Berlin-based Supersoul Recordings.

=== Name dispute ===
The label's original name was Death From Above Records, dating from Murphy's nickname for the sound system he had helped build for Six Finger Satellite. This name was deemed inappropriate for a New York City-based label following the September 11, 2001 attacks and subsequently shortened to its abbreviation DFA.

In 2004, DFA Records forced the Canadian duo Death From Above to change their name to Death from Above 1979. Murphy said in a 2005 interview with Pitchfork:

We knew about them for a long time, the name thing wasn't a big deal. It wasn't until they signed to a major label, which wouldn't release the record until we signed off on the name. That's how this all came about.... [Parent company of Death From Above 1979's label, Vice] Atlantic's not gonna release a record by a band with the same name as another entity in music.... We spent a lot of money because we didn't just wanna be total fucking assholes and just say no. We were trying to find a way for it to actually work.... I was like, "What the hell's wrong with Death From Above 1979?" But the copyright attorney was like, "No, that's not fine." And I said, "If they become a totally different name, and it delays their record, that's something I'm not comfortable with." So we just tried to make it work as well as possible.

The band would later go on to change their name back to Death from Above in 2017 without any legal repercussions, reverting to Death from Above 1979 in 2020.

=== Dispute over finances ===
In 2013 Murphy filed a lawsuit against Goldsworthy, alleging Goldsworthy owed money from unauthorized bank account withdrawals and improper use of the company credit card. In 2020, Murphy dismissed Galkin, citing concerns about finances and artist relationships. The split was acrimonious and led Galkin to file suit to resolve an unsettled dispute over Galkin's minority ownership interest in the DFA label.

== Sound and influence ==
In addition to Murphy's LCD Soundsystem, the label is currently home to the Juan Maclean, Hot Chip (North America only), Shit Robot, Gavilán Rayna Russom, Prinzhorn Dance School, Shocking Pinks, Holy Ghost!, Still Going, Syclops, Planningtorock and Yacht. They are also jointly releasing music with fellow New York City-based label Rong Music by artists such as Free Blood and Woolfy. The label reissued the first two albums by new wave band Pylon on CD, previously only available on vinyl, and a retrospective collection of tracks by Peter Gordon and the Love of Life Orchestra.

The influence of musicians and bands like Brian Eno, Talking Heads, Liquid Liquid, ESG, Blondie, Yazoo, New Order, and Chicago house music can be heard throughout the DFA catalog. Rather than retread, however, the DFA have taken the live dance music of the time and infused the techniques and themes with a modern aesthetic—alternately faster, heavier, dubbier, noisier, and generally more intense than their influences.

== Artists ==
Artists who have released music on DFA Records include:

- Benoit & Sergio
- Black Dice
- Black Meteoric Star
- The Clouds
- The Crystal Ark
- Dan Bodan
- Delia Gonzalez & Gavin Russom
- Essaie pas
- Factory Floor
- Free Energy
- Fundido
- Guerilla Toss
- Hercules and Love Affair
- Holy Ghost!
- Hot Chip
- Joe Goddard
- Jayson Green & the Jerk
- The Juan Maclean
- Larry Gus
- LCD Soundsystem
- Liquid Liquid
- Marcus Marr
- Marie Davidson
- Mermaid Chunky
- Mock & Toof
- Museum of Love
- Nils Bech
- Panthers
- Peter Gordon and the Love of Life Orchestra
- Pixeltan
- Planningtorock
- Prinzhorn Dance School
- Proper Monday Number
- Pylon
- The Rapture
- Gavilán Rayna Russom
- RIP Magic
- Shit Robot
- Shocking Pinks
- Sinkane
- The 2 Bears
- Yacht
- Yura Yura Teikoku

== Discography ==
=== Label ===
==== Compilations ====
- DFA Compilation, Vol. 1 (DFA · 2003)
- DFA Compilation, Vol. 2 (DFA · 2004)
- DFA Holiday Mix 2005 (DFA · 2005)
- The DFA Remixes – Chapter One (DFA · 2006)
- The DFA Remixes – Chapter Two (DFA · 2006)
- Nobody Knows Anything (Death From Abroad · 2008)
- Songs to Burn and Sing (DFA · 2012)

=== Production ===
The following outlines production credits to The DFA (Murphy and Goldsworthy), and is not a list of recordings released by DFA Records.

- A New Machine for Living by Turing Machine (Jade Tree · 2000)
- AM Gold by Zero Zero (Jade Tree · 2001)
- Out of the Races and Onto the Tracks EP by The Rapture (Sub Pop · 2001)
- Gotham by Radio 4 (City Slang · 2002)
- Automato by Automato (co-produced by Phil Mossman) (Coup de Grace · 2003)
- Echoes by The Rapture (DFA · 2003)
- "El Monte"/"Rise" (single) by Delia Gonzalez & Gavin Russom (DFA · 2003)
- "Get Up/Say What" (single) by Pixeltan (DFA · 2004)
- "Kousho" and "Ibasho" by We Acediasts, on Pre Acediasts EP (Mesh-Key · 2004)
- "Casual Friday" (single) by Black Leotard Front (DFA · 2005)
- LCD Soundsystem by LCD Soundsystem (DFA · 2005)
- Less Than Human by The Juan MacLean (DFA · 2005)
- The Days of Mars LP by Delia Gonzalez & Gavin Russom (DFA · 2005)
- "Wrong Galaxy"/"Triumph" (single) by Shit Robot (DFA · 2006)
- Sound of Silver by LCD Soundsystem (DFA · 2007)
- Prinzhorn Dance School by Prinzhorn Dance School (DFA · 2007)
- "Chasm"/"Lonely Planet" (single) by Shit Robot (DFA · 2007)
- "Hold On" (single) by Holy Ghost! (DFA · 2007)
- "Happy House" (single) by The Juan MacLean (DFA · 2008)
- "The Simple Life" (single) by The Juan MacLean (DFA · 2008)
- The Future Will Come by The Juan MacLean (DFA · 2009)
- "Stuck On Nothing" by Free Energy (DFA · 2009)
- "Simple Things (Work it out)" by Shit Robot (DFA · 2009)
- From the Cradle to the Rave by Shit Robot (co-produced by Marcus Lambkin) (DFA · 2010)

==== Remixes ====
- "Deceptacon" (DFA remix) for Le Tigre, on Remix (Mr. Lady · 2001)
- "Orange Alert" (DFA remix) for Metro Area, on "Dance Reaction" (Source · 2002)
- "Dance to the Underground" (The DFA version) for Radio 4, on "Dance to the Underground" (City Slang · 2002)
- "Emerge" (DFA version) for Fischerspooner, on "Emerge" (Capitol · 2002)
- "Destination: Overdrive" (DFA remix) for Chromeo, on "Destination: Overdrive" (Turbo · 2003)
- "Rise" (DFA remix) for Delia Gonzalez & Gavin Russom, on "El Monte"/"Rise" (DFA · 2003)
- "In a State" (DFA remix) for UNKLE, on "In a State" (Mo' Wax · 2003)
- "Shake Your Coconuts" (DFA mix) and (DFA Instrumental mix) for Junior Senior, on "Shake Your Coconuts" (Atlantic · 2003)
- "Sister Saviour" (DFA remix) and (DFA remix instrumental), and "Echoes" (DFA remix) for The Rapture, on "Sister Saviour" (Output · 2003)
- "Sunplus" (DFA remix) for J.O.Y., on DFA Compilation #2 (DFA · 2004)
- "Get Up/Say What" (DFA remix) for Pixeltan, on "Get Up/Say What" (single) (DFA · 2004)
- "She Wants to Move" (DFA remix) for N.E.R.D., on "She Wants to Move" (Virgin · 2004)
- "Mars, Arizona" (DFA remix) for Blues Explosion, on "Crunchy" EP (Mute · 2005)
- "Dare" (DFA remix) for Gorillaz, on "Dare" (Parlophone · 2005)
- "Another Excuse" (DFA remix) for Soulwax, on "NY Excuse" (PIAS · 2005)
- "The Hand That Feeds" (DFA remix) for Nine Inch Nails, on "The Hand That Feeds" (DFA remixes) and "Only" (Interscope · 2005)
- "Just Like We (Breakdown)" (DFA remix) for Hot Chip, on "Over & Over"/"Just Like We (Breakdown)" (Astralwerks · 2005)
- "Smiling Off" (DFA remix) for Black Dice, on "Smiling Off" (DFA · 2005)
- "The Boxer" (DFA Version) for The Chemical Brothers, on "The Boxer" (Virgin · 2005)
- "(Far From) Home" (DFA remix) for Tiga, on "(Far From) Home" (PIAS · 2006)
- "Colours" (DFA remix) for Hot Chip, on "Colours" (EMI · 2006)
- "Slide In" (DFA remix) for Goldfrapp, on "Fly Me Away" (Mute · 2006)
- "Relevee" (DFA remix) for Delia Gonzalez & Gavin Russom, on "Revelee" (DFA · 2006)
- "Springfield" (DFA Remix) for Arthur Russell, on "Springfield" (Audika · 2006)
- "My Love" (DFA Remix) for Justin Timberlake, on "My Love" (Zomba · 2006)
- "Frontline" (DFA Remix) for Captain, on "Frontline" (EMI · 2006)
- "Paper Planes" (DFA Remix) for M.I.A. on Paper Planes (Homeland Security Remixes) - EP (XL Records - 2008)
- "Tomorrow" (DFA Remix) for Clinic on "Tomorrow" (Domino Recording Company - 2008)
- "Love Is Lost" (Hello Steve Reich Mix By James Murphy For The DFA) for David Bowie on The Next Day Extra (Columbia Records - 2013)

== See also ==
- List of record labels
- List of electronic music record labels
