= Jerry Fuchs =

American drummer (1974–2009)

- Fuchs performing live on drums

Background information
- Born: Gerhardt Fuchs; December 31, 1974
- Died: November 8, 2009 (aged 34) Brooklyn, New York, U.S.
- Genres: Indie rock
- Occupation(s): Musician, graphic artist
- Instrument: Drums
- Years active: 1997–2009

Gerhardt "Jerry" Fuchs (December 31, 1974 – November 8, 2009) was an American indie rock drummer. He was a member of the bands Turing Machine, The Juan MacLean, !!! and Maserati and performed drums live with the groups MSTRKRFT and LCD Soundsystem.

== Career ==
Fuchs attended college at the University of Georgia, where he studied graphic design and drummed in the local Athens bands The Martians, Space Cookie, and Koncak. In 1996 he moved to New York to join Vineland, a four-piece led by Bitch Magnet guitar player Jon Fine. After touring and recording with Vineland for two years, he began to play with Justin Chearno and Scott DeSimon, two former members of the band Pitchblende; this band would later become Turing Machine.

Fuchs's disco and Motorik-influenced style led to his becoming associated with DFA Records, joining the dance-punk group !!!, performing on their album Myth Takes. He was a recording and touring member of The Juan MacLean, and also played live and/or on the recordings of other outfits including Holy Ghost!, LCD Soundsystem, Massive Attack, Moby, Cloudland Canyon (band), and MSTRKRFT. He then joined Maserati, playing on their albums Inventions for the New Season (2007), Passages (2009), and Pyramid of the Sun (posthumously released in 2010). He completed a U.S. tour with Maserati, opening for Mono and STS9 in September–October 2009. In 2012, Turing Machine released their third album What Is The Meaning Of What featuring some of Fuchs' final works.

Fuchs also did graphic design work for the magazine Chunklet and wrote articles as a freelance writer for Entertainment Weekly.

== Death ==
Early in the morning on November 8, 2009, Fuchs was caught in a broken elevator in Williamsburg, Brooklyn, New York City. When assistance arrived and the doors were pried open, he attempted to jump out of the elevator car. Upon landing, his hood caught on something, pulling him off balance, and he accidentally fell to his death down the elevator shaft. He was attending a benefit to raise education funds for underprivileged children in India.

LCD Soundsystem's third album, This Is Happening, was dedicated to Fuchs' memory, as was the Holy Ghost! song, "Jam for Jerry", on their debut album. The album Tunnel Blanket by This Will Destroy You is also dedicated to his memory.
