= Pyramid of the Sun (album) =

Studio album by Maserati
- Released: November 9, 2010
- Genre: Post-rock
- Length: 40:16
- Label: Temporary Residence

Maserati chronology
Inventions for the New Season (2007)	Pyramid of the Sun (2010)	Maserati VII (2012)

Professional ratings
Review scores
Source	Rating
AbsolutePunk	
AllMusic	3/5 stars
The A.V. Club	B+
Pitchfork Media	7.4/10

Pyramid of the Sun is an album by Maserati. The band's fourth major album, it was released on November 9, 2010.

After the death of the band's drummer, Jerry Fuchs, the album was intended to celebrate his life. The drums for the album had been recorded prior to his death.

== Track listing ==
No.	Title	Length
1.	"Who Can Find the Beast?"	2:32
2.	"Pyramid of the Sun"	4:35
3.	"We Got the System to Fight the System"	4:13
4.	"They'll No More Suffer from Thirst"	4:52
5.	"Ruins"	2:53
6.	"They'll No More Suffer from Hunger"	6:25
7.	"Oaxaca"	8:11
8.	"Bye M'Friend, Goodbye"	6:35
Total length:		40:16
