= Enter the Mirror =

Studio album by Maserati
- Released: April 3, 2020
- Length: 38:39
- Label: Temporary Residence Limited

Maserati chronology
Rehumanizer (2015)	Enter the Mirror (2020)

Professional ratings
Aggregate scores
Source	Rating
Metacritic	78/100
Review scores
Source	Rating
AllMusic	4/5 stars
Beats Per Minute	62%
musicOMH	4/5 stars
Sputnikmusic	3.5/5 stars

Enter the Mirror is a studio album by American band Maserati. It was released on April 3, 2020, under Temporary Residence Limited.

== Critical reception ==
Enter the Mirror was met with "generally favorable" reviews from critics. At Metacritic, which assigns a weighted average rating out of 100 to reviews from mainstream publications, this release received an average score of 78, based on 4 reviews.

== Track listing ==
Enter the Mirror track listing
No.	Title	Length
1.	"2020"	3:30
2.	"A Warning in the Dark"	6:02
3.	"Killing Time"	5:01
4.	"Der Honig"	6:23
5.	"Welcome to the Other Side"	4:08
6.	"Empty"	5:41
7.	"Wallwalker"	7:54
