= The Language of Cities =

Studio album by Maserati
- Released: 2002
- Genre: Post-rock
- Length: 49:55
- Label: Kindercore Records

Maserati chronology
37:29:24 (2000)	The Language of Cities (2002)	Inventions for the New Season (2007)

Professional ratings
Review scores
Source	Rating
AllMusic	4/5 stars
Pitchfork Media	(7.3/10)

The Language of Cities is the second studio album by Maserati, released in 2002.

== Track listing ==
1. "Ambassador of Cinema" (6:04)
2. "The Language" (7:48)
3. "Moving with Heavy Hearts" (7:59)
4. "Keep it Gold" (2:53)
5. "Being a President Is Like Riding a Tiger" (7:57)
6. "Cities" (6:54)
7. "A Common Interest in Silence" (2:49)
8. "There Will Always Be Someone Behind You" (7:31)

== See also ==
- Here Grows New York, a film with its soundtrack adapted from the album
