= Maserati VII =

Studio album by Maserati
- Released: October 2, 2012
- Genre: Post-rock
- Label: Temporary Residence

Maserati chronology
| Pyramid of the Sun (2010) | Maserati VII (2012) | Rehumanizer (2015) |

Professional ratings
Review scores
| Source | Rating |
|---|---|
| Pitchfork Media | 7.7/10 |
| Allmusic | 3.5/5 stars |
| Sputnikmusic | 3.5/5 stars |

Maserati VII is the fifth studio album by the rock band Maserati. It was released on October 2, 2012.

== Track listing ==
| No. | Title | Length |
|---|---|---|
| 1. | "San Angeles" | 6:35 |
| 2. | "Martin Rev" | 8:16 |
| 3. | "The Eliminator" | 3:54 |
| 4. | "Flashback" | 2:31 |
| 5. | "Abracadabracab" | 10:41 |
| 6. | "Solar Exodus" | 6:48 |
| 7. | "Lunar Drift" | 3:50 |
| 8. | "Earth-Like" | 4:12 |
| 9. | "San Tropea" | 7:07 |
