= Pitchblende (band) =

American musical group

- Origin: Washington, D.C., U.S.
- Genres: Art punk
- Years active: 1991–1995
- Labels: Cargo; Jade Tree; Matador Records; Simple Machines
- Spinoffs: Turing Machine
- Members: Justin Chearno (guitar); Treiops Treyfid (guitar); Scott DeSimon (bass guitar); Patrick Gough (drums)

Pitchblende was an American four-piece art punk band from Washington, D.C., United States, composed of Justin Chearno on guitar, Scott DeSimon on bass guitar, Patrick Gough on drums and Treiops Treyfid on guitar.

Between 1991 and 1995, the group recorded three albums and several singles for the independent labels Cargo, Jade Tree, Matador Records and Simple Machines.

== Style ==
Coworkers and guitarists Justin Chearno and Treiops Treyfid met Patrick Gough after placing an ad on the Washington City Paper seeking a drummer who shared their interest in Sonic Youth, Live Skull, Mission of Burma, and William Shatner. The three soon recruited Gough's friend Scott DeSimon on bass. Though Pitchblende shared a practice space with Jawbox for about 18 months, the band members were not quite insiders in the D.C. punk scene, feeling more kinship with the likes of Brainiac, Rodan, Polvo, Unwound, Candy Machine, and Codeine.

Most of Pitchblende's debut full-length, Kill Atom Smasher, was recorded live with minimal overdubs, late at night at Inner Ear Studios with engineer and Girls Against Boys member Eli Janney. Additional snippets of improvised music were recorded at a studio at the American University.

Although based in Washington, Pitchblende's dense, angular sound was commonly thought to be closer in style to the contemporary music scenes in New York City and Chicago than what was heard on the DC-based post-punk labels at the time. Central to Pitchblende's approach was an emphasis on experimentation and dynamics; the band's songs often used complex structures, unusual arrangements, alternative tunings and jarring time changes.

Pitchblende's recordings and loud, energetic live shows earned them critical accolades and comparisons with influential bands such as Mission of Burma and Sonic Youth. The group melded together the chaotic spirit of punk with an absurdist, dada aesthetic; somewhat pop sensibilities; and a musical proficiency informed by prog-rock bands. In spite of occasional references to being inspired by jazz, very little of Pitchblende's music was improvisational. This misconception prompted the band to cheekily rename itself The Pitchblende Quartet for its final 1995 album, Gygax!.

Chearno and DeSimon moved to New York City and the band played its final show on September 5th, 1995 at the city's famous underground venue Brownies.

Chearno and DeSimon formed the three piece instrumental band Turing Machine with the late Jerry Fuchs. Chearno went on to form the bands Doldrums and Panthers, and later worked in the wine industry in New York. DeSimon is a magazine editor. Gough is an urban planner in Northern Virginia who played in the D.C.-based trio Imperial China from 2007 to 2013 and is currently in the duo Czonka. Treyfid is a Los Angeles-based fine artist, solo musician, and graphic designer who performs in drag as Disasterina. Chearno died on August 22, 2024, at the age of 54.

== Discography ==
=== Singles and EPs ===
- "Sum"/"Lacquer Box" 7-inch, Landspeed - LS001, February 1992
- The Weed Slam EP 7-inch - "Weed Slam"/"Ask Rexella"/"Ursa Minor", Jade Tree - JT1008, October 1992
- Penny for the Guy Working Holiday split 7-inch (with Swirlies), Simple Machines - WH11, November 1993
- "Psychic Power Control"/"In the Flat Field" 7-inch, Cargo - Fist15, May 1994
- "Nine-Volt"/"Karoshi" 7-inch (alternative versions), Pushead Fan Club limited/signed run of 400, September 1994
- "Windshield Kiss" split 7-inch (with Eggs), Jade Tree - JT-16, November 1995

=== LPs ===
- Kill Atom Smasher CD/LP, Cargo - Fist12, April 1993
- Au Jus CD/CS, Cargo - Fist22, June 1994 - CD/LP, Matador (Europe) - Ole 102, April 1995
- Gygax! CD, Cargo - HED-048, February 1996 - Gygax! CD/LP, Matador (Europe) - Ole 190, April 1996

=== Appearances ===
- "Drop In the Big Drink" split 7-inch (with Rocket from the Crypt, Rodan, and Walleye), Compulsive - COMP12, October 1993
- Chairman of the Board - Frank Sinatra Tribute, double CD, "Here's to the Losers", Grass/Dutch East - GROW1212-2, Spring 1995
- Working Holiday! double CD, "Penny for the Guy" 7-inch version and a live recording of "Flax" at the Working Holiday Festival, January 1994, Simple Machines - SMR 26, December 1994
- WGNS Gots No Station compilation, "Sideling Hill" (alternate version), 1994
- Jade Tree First Five Years, "Windshield Kiss" 7-inch, 2000
