= Panthers (band) =

American post hardcore/hardcore punk band

- Origin: Brooklyn, New York, U.S.
- Genres: post-hardcore, hardcore punk, punk rock, sasscore, noise rock
- Years active: 2000–present
- Labels: Vice, Dim Mak, Troubleman Unlimited
- Spinoff of: Orchid; Turing Machine; The Red Scare
- Members: Justin Chearno; Geoff Garlock; Jayson Green; Jeff Salane; Kip Uhlhorn

Panthers is an American post hardcore band from Brooklyn, New York City. The Village Voice described them as "groundbreaking dissonant HC (hardcore) with Rolling Stones swagger." Three members were previously in the screamo band Orchid. Panthers have released four records. The most recent two, The Trick and Things Are Strange were released on Vice Records. Prior to that they released via Dim Mak Records and Troubleman Unlimited.

They began as a side project by members of the bands Orchid, Turing Machine, and The Red Scare.

Kip Uhlhorn went on to form the band Cloudland Canyon with Simon Wojan of King Khan & the Shrines.

== Members ==
- Justin Chearno – guitar
- Jayson Green – vocals
- Geoff Garlock – bass
- Jeff Salane – drums
- Kip Uhlhorn – guitar

== Releases ==
- Are You Down?? (Troubleman Unlimited, 2002)
- Let's Get Serious EP (Dim Mak, 2003)
- Things Are Strange (Vice, 2004)
- The Trick (Vice, 2007)
