= History of New York City =

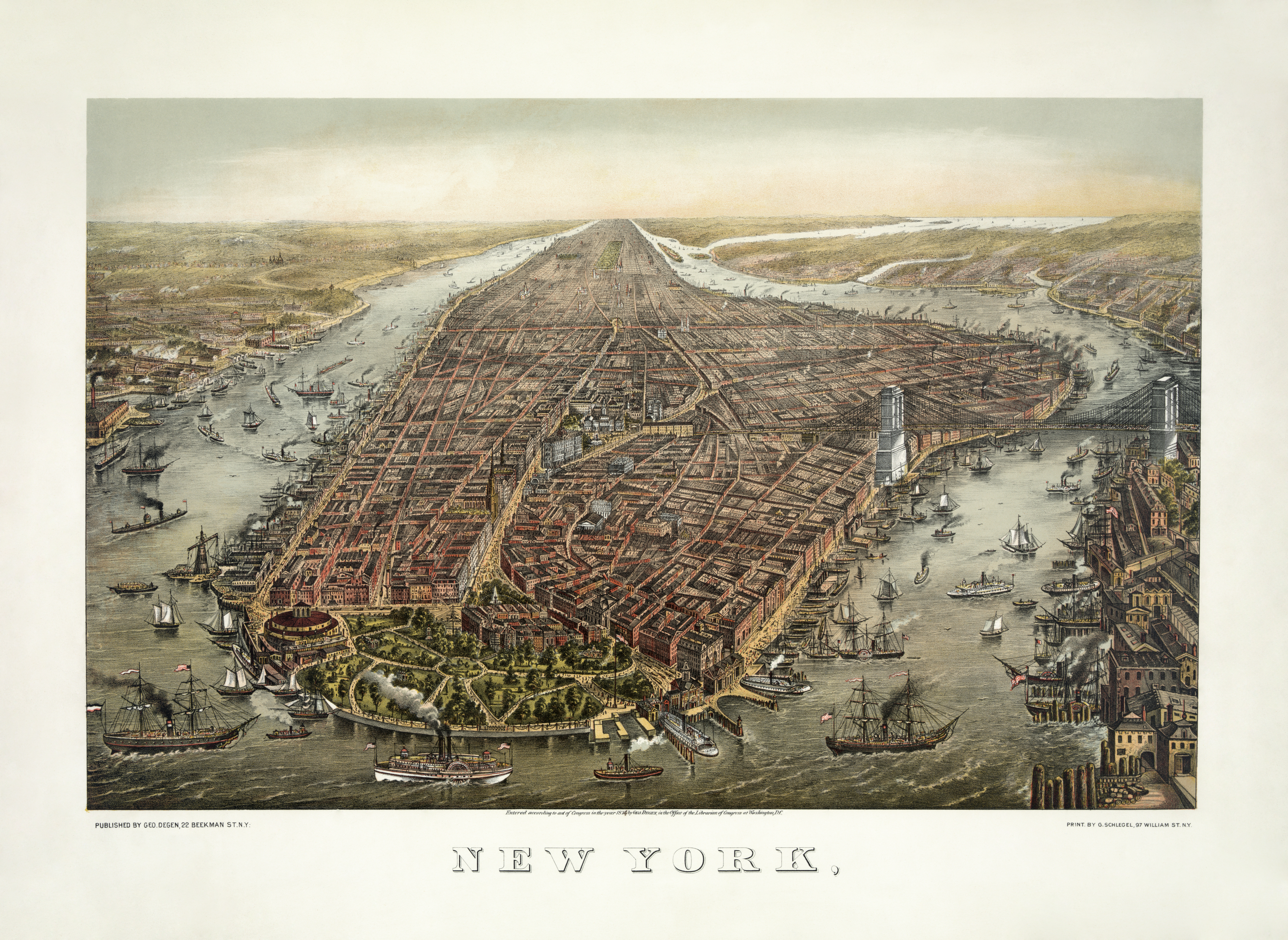
Manhattan in 1873, looking north. The Hudson River is at left. The Brooklyn Bridge across the East River (at right) was built from 1870 to 1883.

City of New York population by year
1656	1,000
1690	6,000
1790	33,131
1800	60,515
1810	96,373
1820	123,706
1830	202,589
1840	312,710
1850	515,547
1860	813,669
1870	942,292
1880	1,206,299
1890	1,515,301
1900	3,437,202
1910	4,766,883
1920	5,620,048
1930	6,930,446
1940	7,454,995
1950	7,891,957
1960	7,781,984
1970	7,894,862
1980	7,071,639
1990	7,322,564
2000	8,008,278
2010	8,175,133
2020	8,804,190
Including the "outer boroughs" before the 1898 consolidation
1790	49,000
1800	79,200
1830	242,300
1850	696,100
1880	1,912,000

The written history of New York City begins with the arrival of the first European explorer to the area, Italian Giovanni da Verrazzano in 1524 and his brief interactions with the Indigenous Lenape. European settlement began with the Dutch in 1608 and New Amsterdam was founded with the assistance of the Lenape in 1624.

The Sons of Liberty campaigned against British authority in New York City, and the Stamp Act Congress of representatives from throughout the Thirteen Colonies met in the city in 1765 to organize resistance to Crown policies. The city's strategic location and status as a major seaport made it the prime target for British seizure in 1776. General George Washington lost a series of battles from which he narrowly escaped (with the notable exception of the Battle of Harlem Heights, his first victory of the war), and the British Army occupied New York and made it their base on the continent until late 1783, attracting Loyalist refugees.

The city served as the national capital under the Articles of Confederation from 1785 to 1789, and briefly served as the new nation's capital in 1789–1790 under the United States Constitution. Under the new government, the city hosted the inauguration of George Washington as the first President of the United States, the drafting of the United States Bill of Rights, and the first Supreme Court of the United States. The opening of the Erie Canal New York and the Great Lakes, along with coastal traffic to lower New England, making the city the preeminent port on the Atlantic Ocean as it long had been with the Beaver Pelt Trade. The arrival of rail connections to the north and west in the 1840s and 1850s strengthened its central role.

Beginning in the mid-19th century, waves of new immigrants arrived from Europe, dramatically changing the composition of the city and serving as workers in the expanding industries. Modern New York traces its development to the consolidation of the five boroughs in 1898 and an economic and building boom following the Great Depression and World War II. Throughout its history, New York has served as a main port of entry for many immigrants, and its cultural and economic influence has made it one of the most important urban areas in the United States and the world. The economy in the 1700s was based on farming, local production, fur trading, including the North American Beaver Pelt Trade, and Atlantic jobs like shipbuilding. In the 1700s, New York was sometimes referred to as a breadbasket colony, because one of its major crops was wheat. New York colony also exported other goods including iron ore as a raw material and manufactured goods such as tools, plows, nails and kitchen items such as kettles, pans and pots.

== Native American settlement ==
Prior to the first human settlement, the area that eventually encompassed modern day New York was originally a marshland swamp, with numerous streams and creeks throughout modern day Manhattan Island. The first human Inhabitants were by the Lenape people. These groups of culturally and linguistically related Native Americans traditionally spoke an Algonquian language now referred to as Unami. Early European settlers called bands of Lenape by the Unami place name for where they lived, such as "Raritan" in Staten Island and New Jersey, "Canarsee" in Brooklyn, and "Hackensack" in New Jersey across the Hudson River from Lower Manhattan. Some modern place names such as Raritan Bay and Canarsie are derived from Lenape names. Eastern Long Island neighbors were culturally and linguistically more closely related to the Mohegan-Pequot peoples of New England who spoke the Mohegan-Montauk-Narragansett language.

The modern name "Manhattan" is also derived from Lenape languages, with many possible variations in the exact definition and origin. The most commonly known original name for the island of Manhattan is "Manahatta", meaning "island of many hills", or "place for gathering wood to make bows". This name has been seen on maps and in letters, with spelling variations including "Manahata", "Manahatin", and "Manna-hatta". An early story from a Moravian Missionary claimed the Dutch gave alcohol to Indigenous Delaware, or Lenape as they called themselves, people upon their arrival, resulting in the Delaware calling the island "Mannahachtanink", meaning "the island or place of general intoxication". This story has however been largely disproved due to linguistic studies of the Unami, Munsee and German languages.

Along with assistance from Albert Seqaqkind Anthony, a member of the Delaware Delegation from the Six Nations Reserve who was fluent in the Munsee language and linguistic studies of Munsee, Algonquin, Unami, and Delaware languages, the name can be defined as "the place where we get more bows". While it has been difficult to determine and fully confirm the original meaning of the name "Manhattan", it is certain that all possible definitions come from indigenous names for the island's usage.

These peoples made use of the abundant waterways in the New York region for fishing, hunting trips, trade, and occasionally war. Many paths created by the indigenous peoples are now main thoroughfares, such as Broadway in Manhattan, the Bronx, and Westchester. The Lenape developed sophisticated techniques of hunting and managing their resources. By the time of the arrival of Europeans, they were cultivating fields of vegetation through the slash and burn technique, which extended the productive life of planted fields. They also harvested vast quantities of fish and shellfish from the bay. Historians estimate that at the time of European settlement, approximately 5,000 Lenape lived in 80 settlements around the region.

== European exploration and settlement ==
=== New Angoulême ===
The first European visitor to the area was Giovanni da Verrazzano, an Italian in command of the French ship La Dauphine in 1524. It is believed he sailed into Upper New York Bay, where he encountered native Lenape, returned through the Narrows, where he anchored the night of April 17, and left to continue his voyage. He named the area New Angoulême (La Nouvelle-Angoulême) in honor of Francis I, King of France of the royal house of Valois-Angoulême and who had been Count of Angoulême from 1496 until his coronation in 1515. The name refers to the town of Angoulême, in the Charente département of France. For the next century, the area was occasionally visited by fur traders or explorers, such as by Esteban Gomez in 1525.

European exploration continued on September 2, 1609, when the Englishman Henry Hudson, in the employ of the Dutch East India Company, sailed the Half Moon through the Narrows into Upper New York Bay. Like Christopher Columbus, Hudson was looking for a westerly passage to Asia. He never found one, but he did take note of the abundant beaver population. Beaver pelts were in fashion in Europe, fueling a lucrative business. Hudson's report on the regional beaver population served as the impetus for the founding of Dutch trading colonies in the New World. The beaver's importance in New York's history is reflected by its use on the city's official seal.

=== Dutch settlement ===
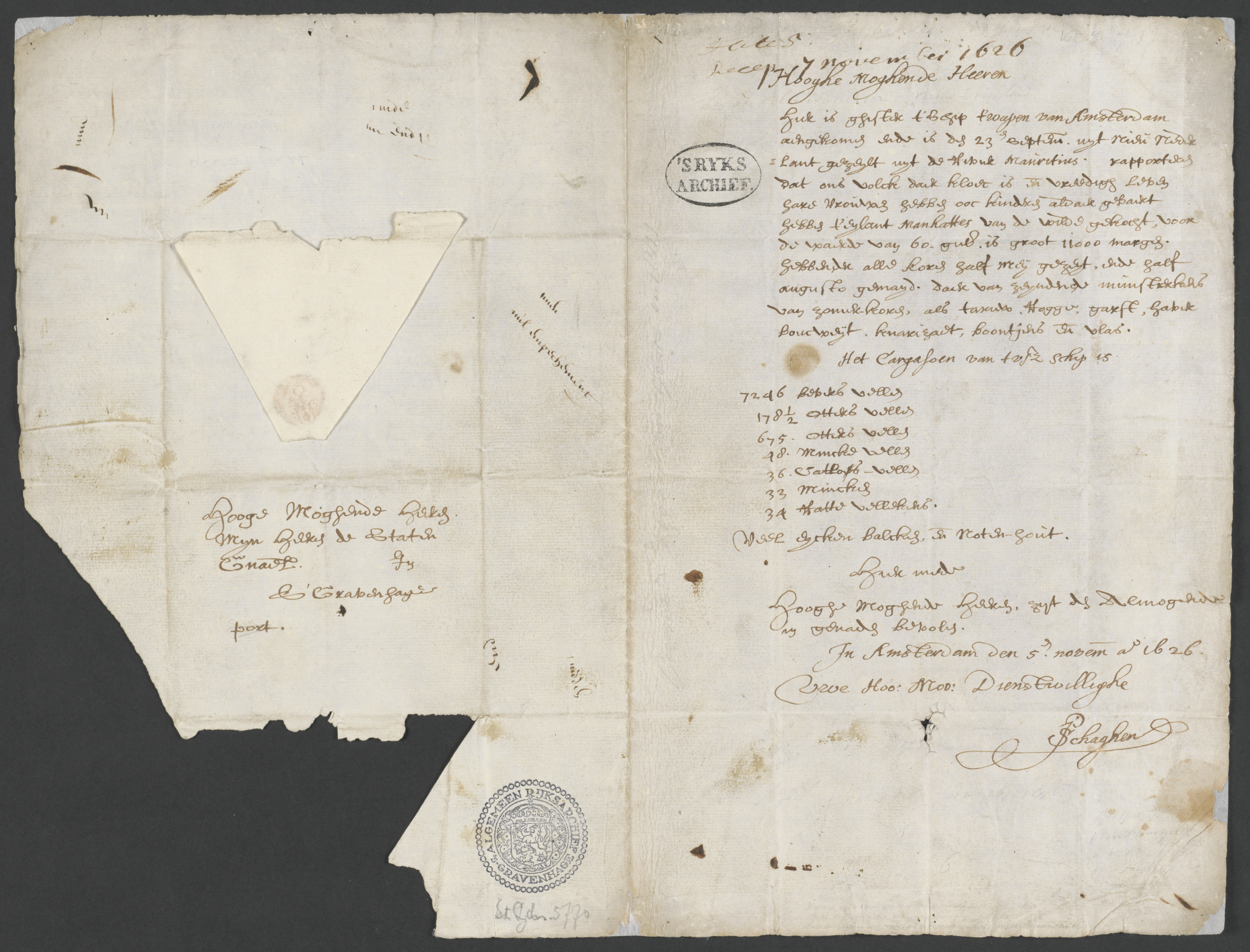
1627 letter in Dutch by Pieter Schaghen stating the purchase of Manhattan for 60 guilders

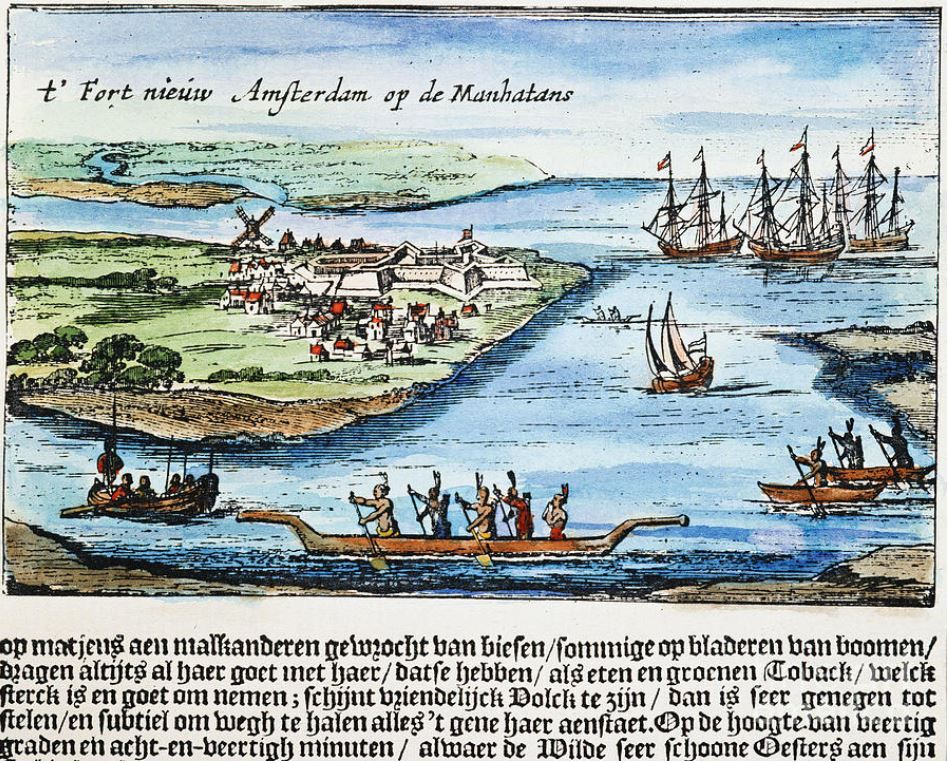
New Amsterdam 1651 -- "Hartger's View" is considered the oldest known image of New Amsterdam, later, New York.

The first Dutch fur trading posts and settlements were in 1614 near present-day Albany, New York, the same year that New Netherland first appeared on maps. In May 1624 the Dutch West India Company landed a number of families at Noten Eylant (today's Governors Island) off the southern tip of Manhattan at the mouth of the North River (today's Hudson River). Soon thereafter, most likely in 1626, construction of Fort Amsterdam began. Later, the Dutch West India Company imported African slaves to serve as laborers; they were forced to build the wall that defended the town against English and Indian attacks. Early directors included Willem Verhulst and Peter Minuit. Willem Kieft became director in 1638 but five years later was embroiled in Kieft's War against the Native Americans. The Pavonia Massacre, across the Hudson River in present-day Jersey City, resulted in the death of 80 natives in February 1643. Following the massacre, Algonquian tribes joined forces and nearly defeated the Dutch. Holland sent additional forces to the aid of Kieft, leading to the overwhelming defeat of the Native Americans and a peace treaty on August 29, 1645.

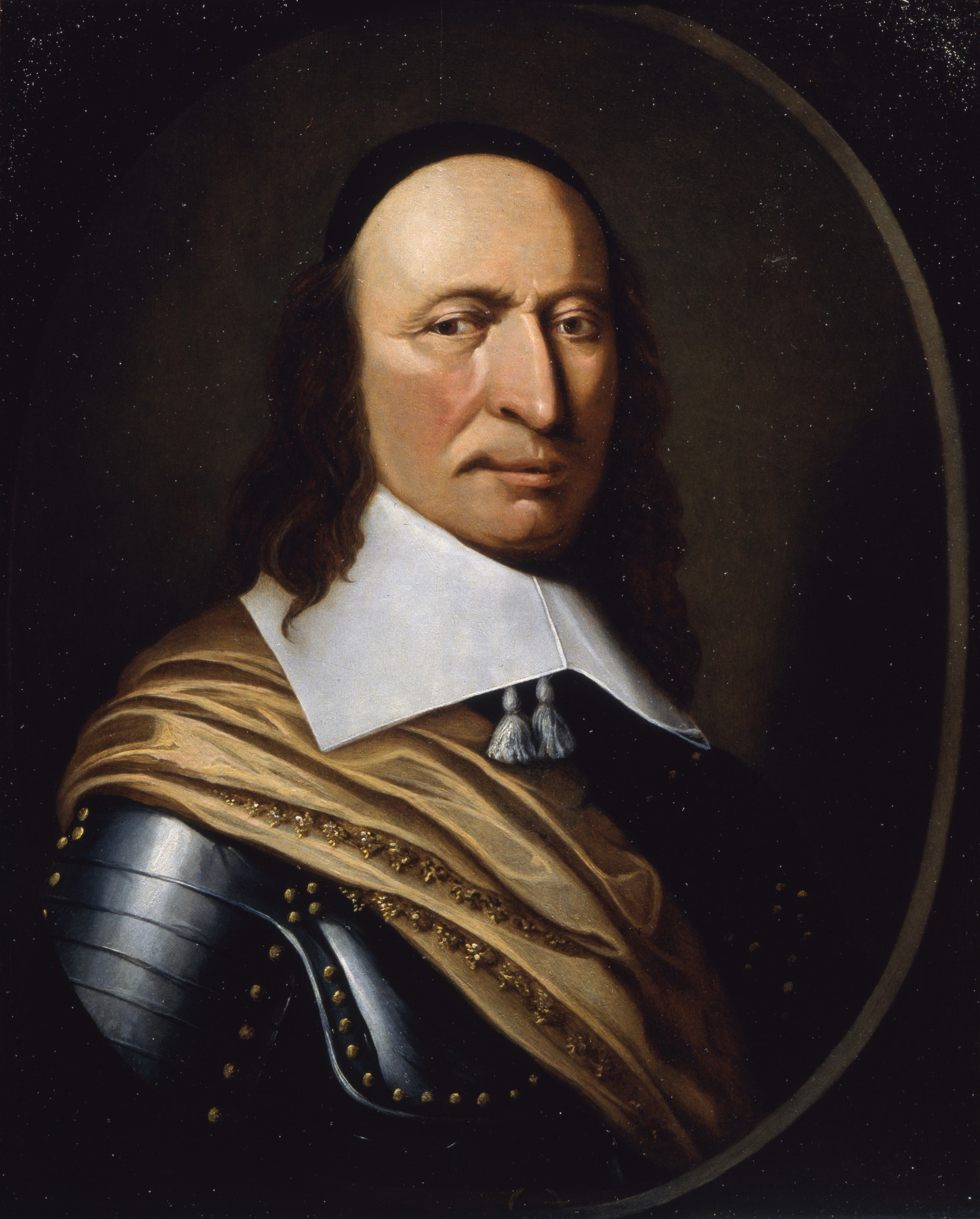
Peter Stuyvesant, first director-general of New Amsterdam

On May 27, 1647, Peter Stuyvesant was inaugurated as director general upon his arrival and ruled as a member of the Dutch Reformed Church. The colony was granted self-government in 1652, and New Amsterdam was incorporated as a city on February 2, 1653. The first mayors (burgemeesters) of New Amsterdam, Arent van Hattem and Martin Cregier, were appointed in that year. By the early 1660s, the population consisted of approximately 1500 Europeans, only about half of whom were Dutch, and 375 Africans, 300 of whom were slaves. (Note: Although it has been claimed that African slaves comprised 40% of the small population of the city at that time, this has not been substantiated.)

A few of the original Dutch place names have been retained, most notably Flushing (after the Dutch town of Vlissingen), Harlem (after Haarlem), and Brooklyn (after Breukelen). Few buildings, however, remain from the 17th century. The oldest recorded house still in existence in New York, the Pieter Claesen Wyckoff House in Brooklyn, dates from 1652.

Peter Minuit is most commonly known for the story of his purchase of Manhattan. The story says that Manhattan, a part of the larger Lenape territory called Lenapehoking, was traded for goods given by Minuit to the Indigenous people living there at the time, the Lenape. This story has been accepted for years as a legitimate purchase allowing the Dutch to create colonial settlements on the island. It has recently been recognized that the Indigenous people would not have understood the idea of land purchase and land ownership in the same way that the colonial settlers would have. Typically, Lenape people viewed land not as something that could be traditionally purchased or permanently owned by any one person or group, rather with the concept of land ownership shifting with use and season. The Lenape living in this area assisted the settlers in hunting and creating early settlements before and after this "purchase", this assisted the colony's initial development and continued ability to grow and survive.

The Beaver Pelt Trade

In 1610, the fur trade between Dutch colonists and Indigenous people began. The New Netherland colony founded by the Dutch grew from continued usage of the new abundance of resources available to the colonists and exploitation of the "soft gold", beaver pelts, of the area. The fur trade largely consisted of Indigenous people providing beaver pelts in exchange for tools or goods from the colonists. The North American fur trade was spurred by the popularity of fur in Europe, previously only able to be acquired from Russia, which led to the large-scale hunting in North America when this unexploited population was found by the colonists.

Before the presence of Europeans in North America, Indigenous peoples used the beavers for their fur, meat, oils, utilizing every part of the animal for different purposes. Europeans primarily used the beavers fur for hats, a popular fashion choice and status symbol in Europe. The British participated in the beaver pelt trade, with a trade route through New York City and Albany. Colonial economic dependence on the fur trade promoted the creation of relationships with Indigenous people, as the British competed with the French for beaver pelts and profit. Prominent New York families, including the Astors, benefited greatly from this trade, using money gained to invest in the development of the city.

The New York beaver trade was a part of the North American Beaver Trade, which contributed to the depletion of the North American Beaver population from an estimated 100 million in 1600 to near extinction by 1700. Prior to colonization, the beaver population of New York State was estimated to be 60 million. Beavers have since been reintroduced to the New York environment, with beavers having been spotted in the Bronx River, in Manhattan, Brooklyn, and on Staten Island.

Indigenous traditional practices and knowledge of trapping, hunting and beaver habitats contributed to this trade's success. The beaver trade was significant to the economic development of New York City and New York State, displayed on the state flag and seal as a memorial of this significance.

=== English rule: 1664–1783 ===
On August 27, 1664, four English frigates under the command of Col. Richard Nicolls sailed into New Amsterdam's harbor and demanded New Netherland's surrender, as part of an effort by King Charles II's brother James, Duke of York, the Lord High Admiral to provoke the Second Anglo-Dutch War. Two weeks later, Stuyvesant officially capitulated by signing Articles of Surrender and in June 1665, the town was reincorporated under English law and renamed "New York" after the Duke, and Fort Orange was renamed "Fort Albany". The war ended in a Dutch victory in 1667, but the colony remained under English rule as stipulated in the Treaty of Breda. During the Third Anglo-Dutch War, the Dutch briefly recaptured the city in 1673, renaming the city "New Orange", before permanently ceding the colony of New Netherland to England for what is now Suriname in November 1674 at the Treaty of Westminster.

The colony benefited from increased immigration from Europe and its population grew faster. The British Parliament's Bolting Act (enacted in 1678 and reinforced in 1680) granted New York City an exclusive monopoly on the "bolting" (sifting and milling) of wheat and corn and on the export of flour within the Province of New York. It boosted population growth in the city until its repeal in 1694, increasing the number of houses over the period from 384 to 983. The Act also led to a sharp rise in the demand for enslaved labor, and the city became one of colonial America's largest urban centers for the Atlantic slave trade, second only to Charleston, South Carolina. New York's largest slave traders and slaveholders were Frederick Philipse and his family.

In the context of the Glorious Revolution in England, Jacob Leisler led Leisler's Rebellion and effectively controlled the city and surrounding areas from 1689 to 1691, before being arrested and executed.

==== Lawyers ====
In New York at first, legal practitioners were full-time businessmen and merchants, with no legal training, who had watched a few court proceedings. They mostly used their own common sense together with snippets they had picked up about English law. Court proceedings were quite informal, for the judges had no more training than the attorneys.

By the 1760s, the situation had dramatically changed. Lawyers were essential to the rapidly growing international trade, dealing with questions of partnerships, contracts, and insurance. The sums of money involved were large, and hiring an incompetent lawyer was a very expensive proposition. Lawyers were now professionally trained, and conversant in an extremely complex language that combined highly specific legal terms and motions with a dose of Latin. Court proceedings became a baffling mystery to the ordinary layman. Lawyers became more specialized and built their reputation, and their fee schedule, on the basis of their reputation for success. But as their status, wealth and power rose, animosity grew even faster. By the 1750s and 1760s, there was a widespread attack ridiculing and demeaning the lawyers as pettifoggers (lawyers lacking sound legal skills). Their image and influence declined. The lawyers organized a bar association, but it fell apart in 1768 during the bitter political dispute between the factions based in the Delancey and Livingston families. A large fraction of the prominent lawyers were Loyalists; their clientele was often to royal authority or British merchants and financiers. They were not allowed to practice law unless they took a loyalty oath to the new United States of America. Many went to Britain or Canada (primarily to New Brunswick and Nova Scotia) after losing the war.

For the next century, various attempts were made, and failed, to build an effective organization of lawyers. Finally a Bar Association emerged in 1869 that proved successful and continues to operate.

==== Enslaved people ====
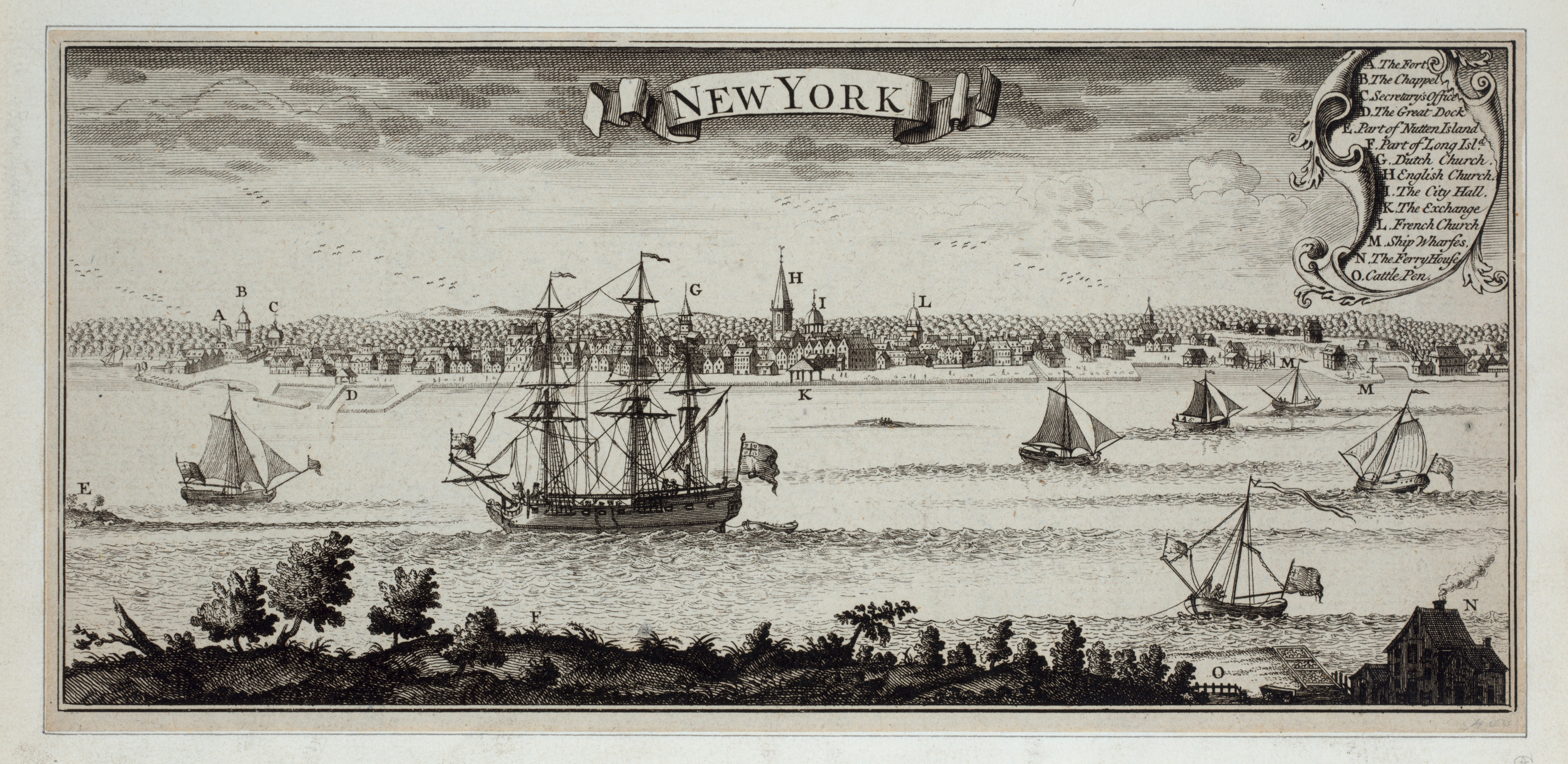
New York Harbor, 1727

The Dutch West Indies Company transported African slaves to the post as trading laborers used to build the fort and stockade, and some gained freedom under the Dutch. After the seizure of the colony in 1664, the slave trade continued to be legal. In 1703, 42% of the New York households had slaves; they served as domestic servants and laborers but also became involved in skilled trades, shipping and other fields. Yet following reform in ethics according to American Enlightenment thought, by the 1770s slaves made up less than 25% of the population.

By the 1740s, 20% of the residents of New York were slaves, totaling about 2,500 people.

After a series of fires in 1741, the city panicked over rumors of its black population conspiring with some poor whites to burn the city. Historians believe their alarm was mostly fabrication and fear, but officials rounded up 31 black and 4 white people, who over a period of months were convicted of arson. Of these, the city executed 13 black people by burning them alive and hanged the remainder of those incriminated.

In 1754, Columbia University was founded under charter by King George II as King's College in Lower Manhattan.

==== Native Americans ====
Prior to colonization, there are estimated to have been around 15,000 Lenape in 80 settlements. By 1700, the Lenape population of New York had diminished to 200. The Lenape population had been greatly depleted primarily through conflict with settlers and genocidal actions by settler governments, dispossession of land, environmental degradation and in part due to disease of which Indigenous people did not have immunity to. Land dispossession from European colonial settlers resulted in the Lenape diaspora, being forced out of Manhattan to modern New Jersey, Pennsylvania, and Delaware. Eventually Lenape populations were forced from the East Coast, and now reside in Oklahoma, Canada, and Wisconsin.

English colonial settlers continued Dutch practices of expansionism and land takeover, with many Indigenous people being forced to leave or assimilate. During the American Revolution, some Indigenous people such as Mohawk leader Joseph Brant, aided the British, hoping to reduce the pace of land expansion, being promised protection of tribal land. Others, such as Mohegan leader Samson Occom and his son-in-law Joseph Johnson aided the Americans for similar reasons.

==== American Revolution ====
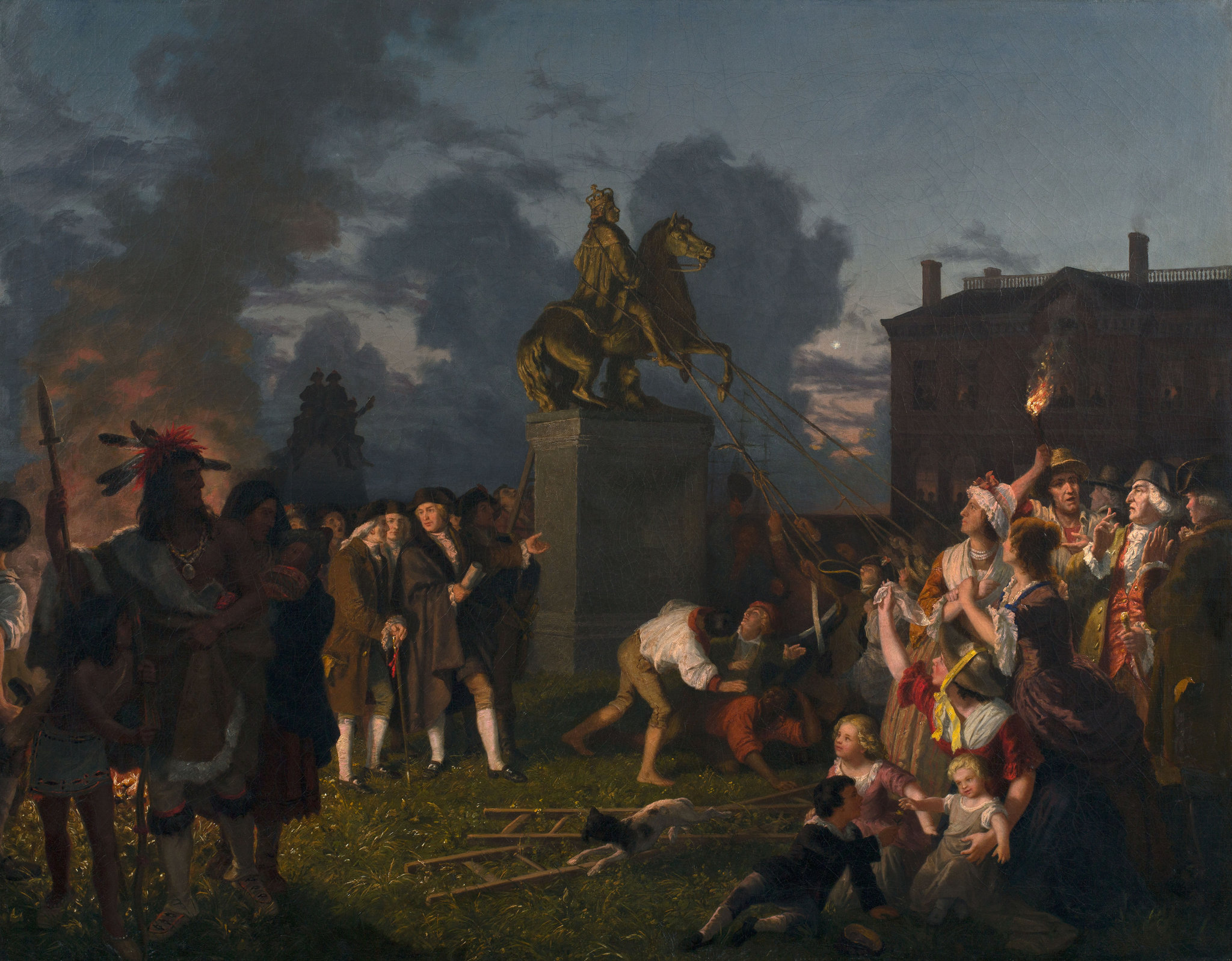
The Statue of King George III located at Bowling Green at the southern tip of Manhattan was pulled down on July 9, 1776, following the first public reading of the Declaration of Independence in New York City.

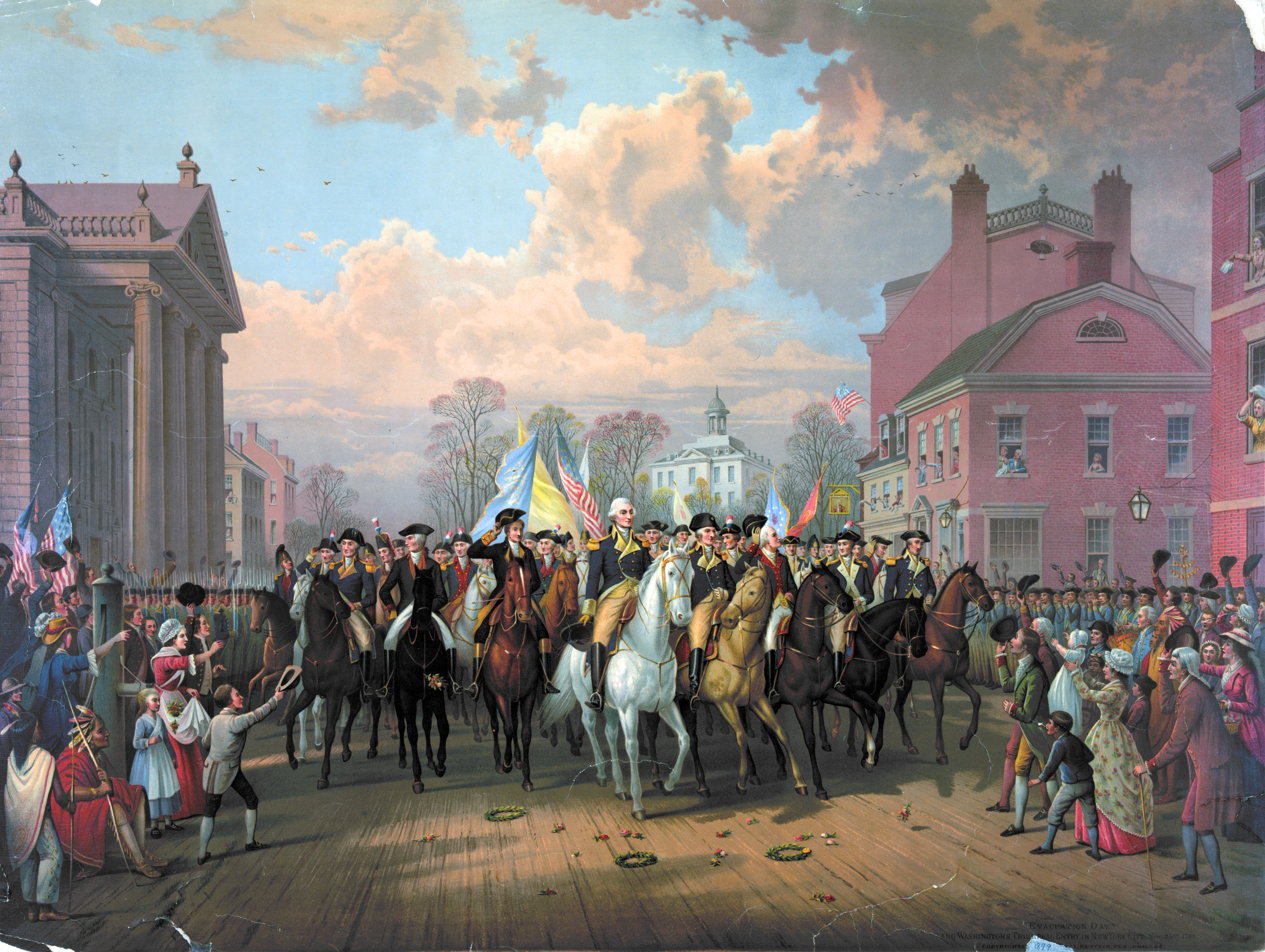
George Washington enters New York in triumph following the British evacuation of America.

The Stamp Act and other British measures fomented dissent, particularly among Sons of Liberty who maintained a long-running skirmish with locally stationed British troops over Liberty Poles from 1766 to 1776. The Stamp Act Congress met in New York City in 1765 in the first organized resistance to British authority across the colonies. On July 9, 1776, George Washington's aid read the United States Declaration of Independence to his troops and the citizens of New York, who latter stormed to Bowling Green, where there stood a statue of King George III, then proceeded to tie ropes to the statue and yanked it off its pedestal and shipped its remains to Litchfield, Connecticut, where most of the lead from the statue was turned into 42,000 musketballs for the Continental Army. In the process, finials on the tops of the fence that was built along the perimeter of Bowling Green to protect the statue depicting the royal symbol of a crown were sawed off, the fence remains standing to this very day and the uneven hack marks where the crown finials used to be are present. After the major defeat of the Continental Army in the Battle of Long Island in late 1776, General George Washington withdrew to Manhattan Island, but with the subsequent defeat at the Battle of Fort Washington the island was effectively left to the British. The city became a British stronghold for the entire war and a haven for loyalist refugees from Patriot-controlled territories. Consequently, the area also became the focal point for Washington's espionage and intelligence-gathering throughout the war. In November 1776, over 500 local loyalists signed a petition that became known as the Declaration of Dependence. They formally renounced the Continental Congress and reaffirmed their allegiance to the British Crown–a bold rebuttal to the Declaration of Independence issued in Philadelphia some five months prior.

New York was greatly damaged twice by fires of suspicious origin, with the Loyalists and Patriots accusing each other of starting the conflagration. The city became the political and military center of operations for the British in North America for the remainder of the war. Continental Army officer Nathan Hale was hanged in Manhattan for espionage. In addition, the British began to hold the majority of captured American prisoners of war aboard prison ships in Wallabout Bay, across the East River in Brooklyn. More Americans lost their lives aboard these ships than died in all the battles of the war. The British occupation lasted until November 25, 1783. George Washington triumphantly returned to the city that day, as the last British forces left the city.

The Treaty of Fort Pitt

In 1778, American soldiers planned to cross Lenape land in Ohio to fight the British in Detroit. In September 1778, appointed diplomats Andrew and Thomas Lewis, George Morgan and Brigadier General McIntosh representing the Continental government, along with several US soldiers, met with Delaware representatives Koquethagechton (White Eyes), Gelemend (John Killbuck Jr.), and Konieschquanoheel or Hopocan (Captain Pipe) at Fort Pitt in Pittsburgh, Pennsylvania. Discussion progressed for several days and an agreement was reached on September 17, 1778. The Treaty of Fort Pitt was signed by Andrew and Thomas Lewis on behalf of the United States of America, promising "perpetual peace and friendship" between the United States and Delaware nations and forgiving any transgressions between the two nations.

The Treaty of Fort Pitt allowed American soldiers to pass through Delaware territory to engage in battle with the British, with Delaware soldiers to assist when possible. It included an agreement that allowed the United States to build a fort within Delaware territory in exchange for the provision of goods to the Delaware. The treaty included an agreement allowing other Indigenous nations to come to the area, creating "a state whereof the Delaware nation shall be the head, and have representation in Congress". This would create a 14th state led by the Delaware leaders, however, this was never approved by Congress.

This treaty broke down quickly following the death of Lenape leader White Eyes. Having joined the attack on the British in Detroit, White Eyes died on the journey. While his cause of death was reported as smallpox, many believed that he was assassinated. While the American officials believed that the work towards the treaty was done once it was signed, the Lenape believed that a treaty required continuous cultivation to maintain a kinship relationship between the nations. According to historian Jeffrey Ostler, the United States did not truly plan to uphold this treaty, proposing it only to convince the Lenape of US benevolence and goodwill. The proposal within the Treaty of Pitt to create a state for the Lenape people with congressional representation had initially been formed to counter arguments of American genocide of Indigenous communities.

Once the treaty had broken down, many Lenape allied with the British, hoping to prevent the further takeover of their land by American colonists. The American government thus declared the treaty officially violated. Violence against Lenape communities and further settlement on Lenape land increased following the treaty's failure, with many Lenape leaving for Canada and Oklahoma, where the communities still live today.

=== Federal and early America: 1784–1854 ===
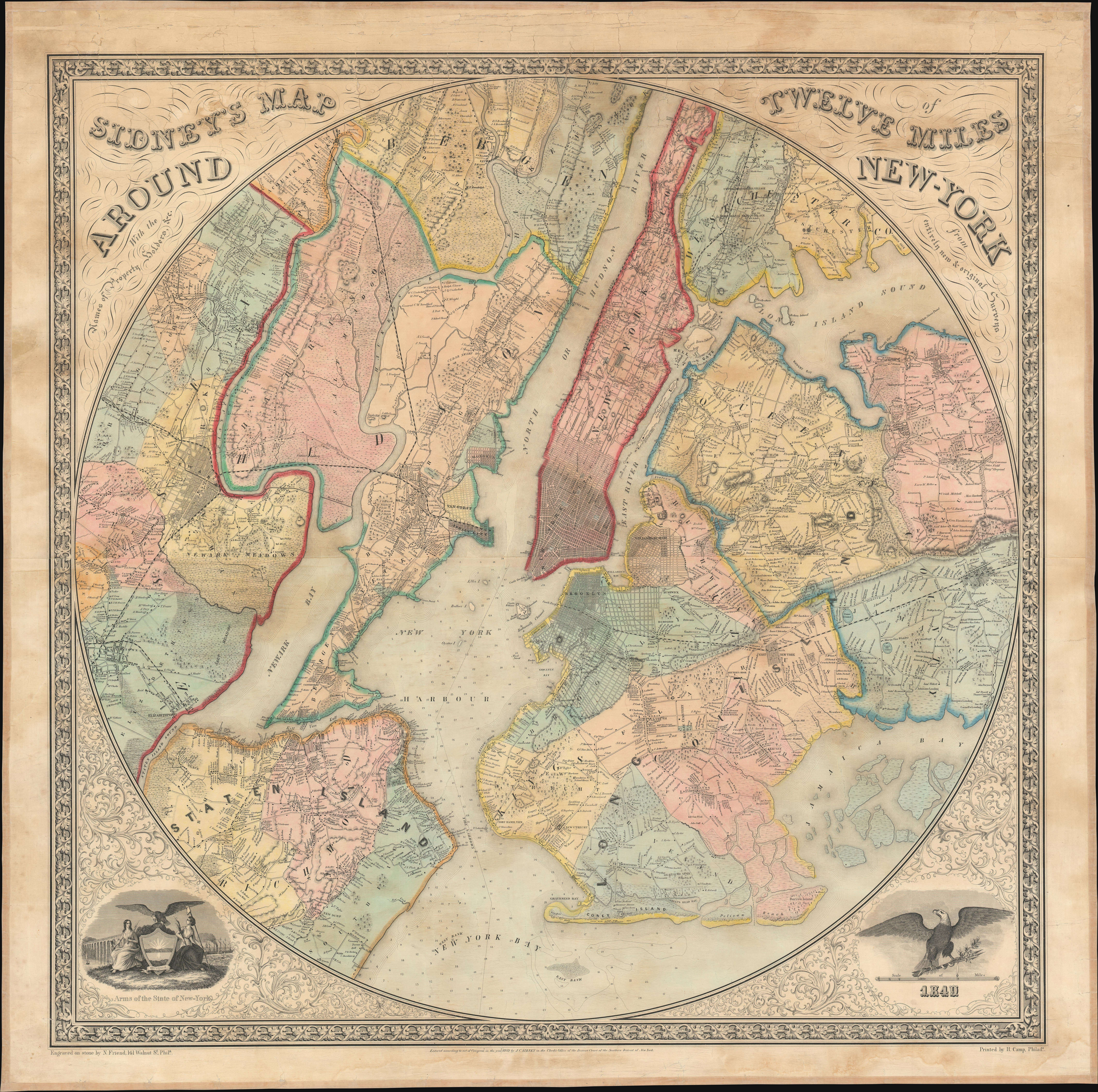
Sidney's Map Twelve Miles Around New York, 1849. Chromo lithograph by James Charles Sidney

Starting in 1785, the Congress met in the city of New York under the Articles of Confederation. In 1789, New York became the first national capital under the new Constitution. The Constitution also created the current Congress of the United States, and its first sitting was at Federal Hall on Wall Street. The first Supreme Court sat there. The United States Bill of Rights was drafted and ratified there. George Washington was inaugurated at Federal Hall. New York remained the national capital until 1790, when the role was transferred to Philadelphia.

During the 19th century, the city was transformed by immigration, a visionary development proposal called the Commissioners' Plan of 1811 which expanded the city street grid to encompass all of Manhattan, and the opening of the Erie Canal in 1825, which connected the Atlantic port to the vast agricultural markets of the Midwestern United States and Canada. By 1835, New York had surpassed Philadelphia as the largest city in the United States. New York grew as an economic center, first as a result of Alexander Hamilton's policies and practices as the first Secretary of the Treasury.

In 1842, water was piped from a reservoir to supply the city for the first time.

The Great Irish Famine (1845–1850) brought a large influx of Irish immigrants, and by 1850 the Irish comprised one quarter of the city's population. Government institutions, including the New York City Police Department and the public schools, were established in the 1840s and 1850s to respond to growing demands of residents. In 1831, New York University was founded by U.S. Secretary of the Treasury Albert Gallatin as a non-denominal institution surrounding Washington Square Park.

== Modern history ==
=== Tammany and consolidation: 1855–1897 ===
This period started with the 1855 inauguration of Fernando Wood as the first mayor from Tammany Hall. It was the political machine based among Irish Americans that controlled the local Democratic Party. It usually dominated local politics throughout this period and into the 1930s. Public-minded members of the merchant community pressed for a Central Park, which was opened to a design competition in 1857; it became the first landscape park in an American city.

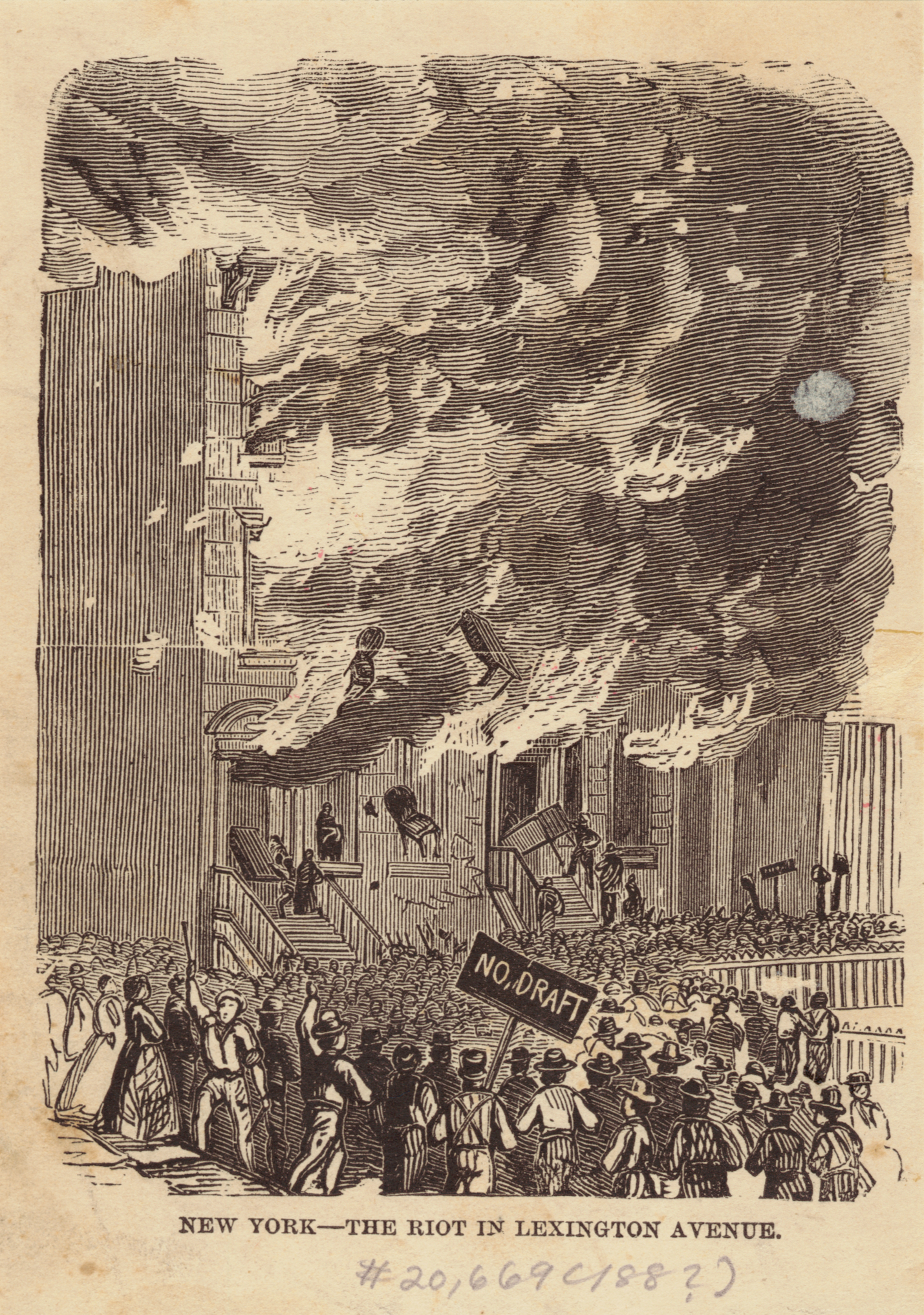
The New York City Draft Riots in 1863

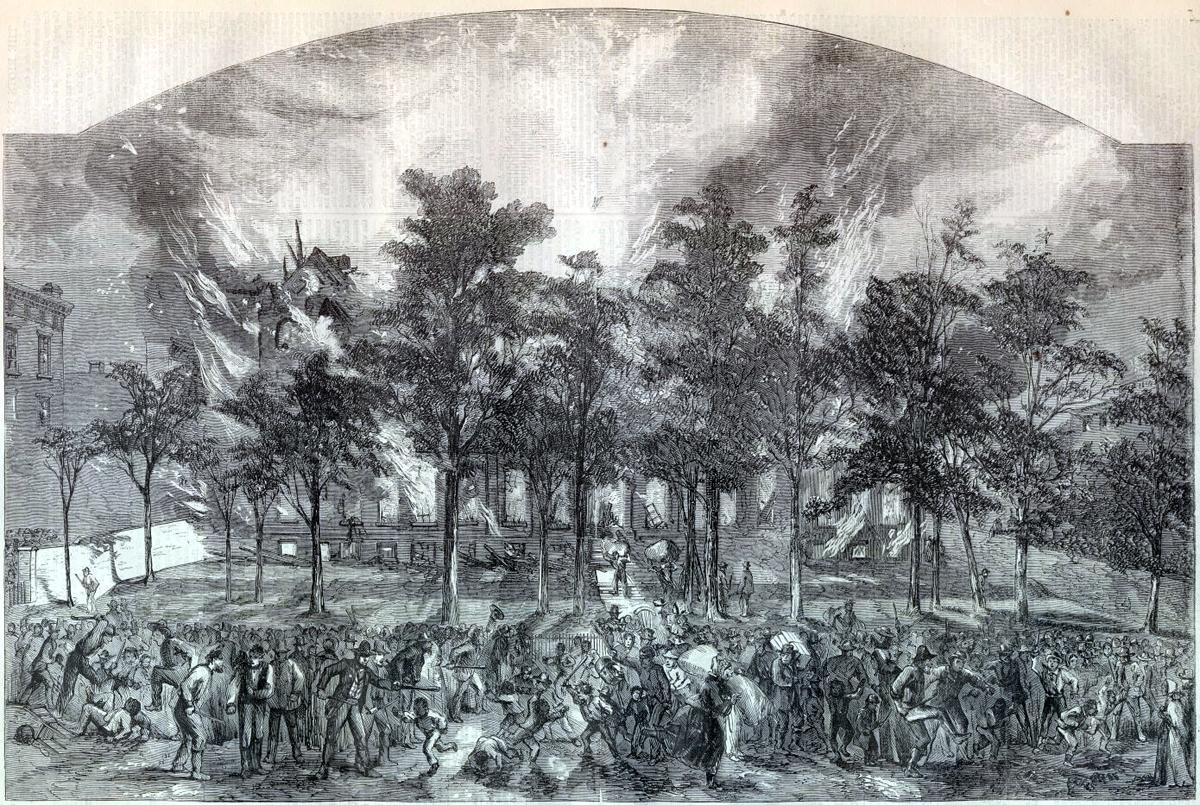
The Colored Orphan Asylum, looted and burned by the rioters in 1863

During the American Civil War (1861–1865), the city was affected by its history of strong commercial ties to the South; before the war, half of its exports were related to cotton, including textiles from upstate mills. Together with its growing immigrant population, which was angry about conscription, sympathies among residents were divided for both the Union and Confederacy at the outbreak of war. Tensions related to the war culminated in the Draft Riots of 1863 led by Irish Catholics, who attacked black neighborhood and abolitionist homes. Many blacks left the city and moved to Brooklyn. After the Civil War, the rate of immigration from Europe grew steeply, and New York became the first stop for millions seeking a new and better life in the United States, a role acknowledged by the dedication of the Statue of Liberty in 1886.

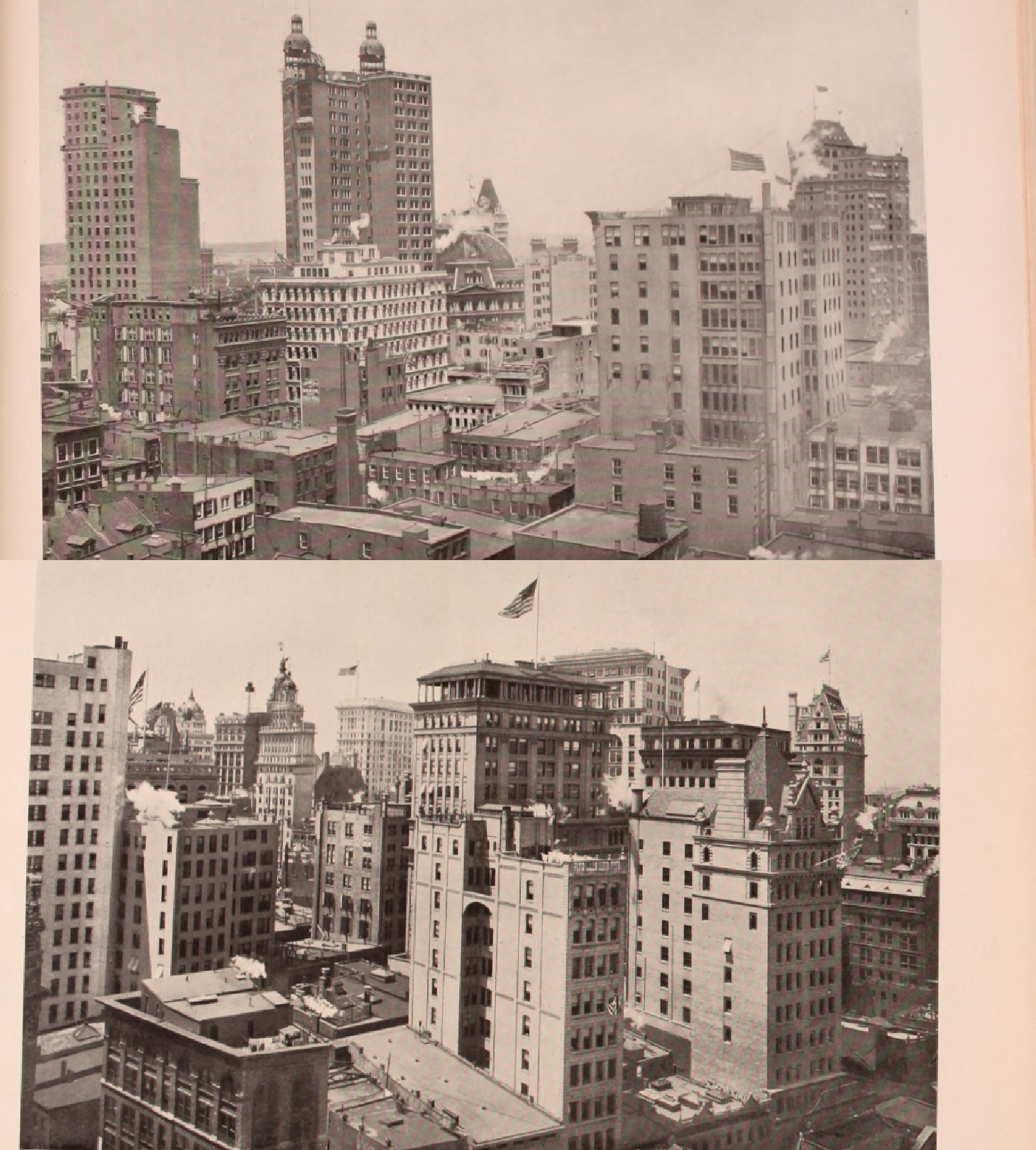
Lower Manhattan in the late 19th century (by D. Appleton)

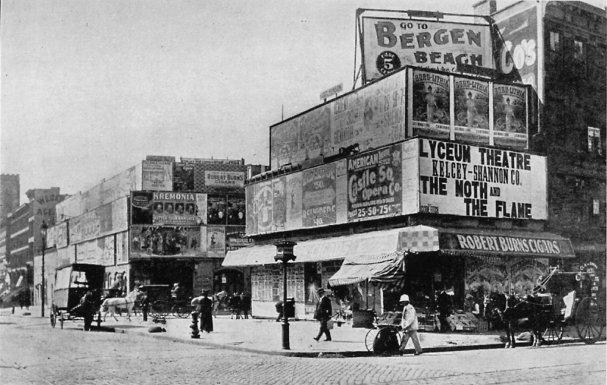
Broadway at 42nd St. in 1898

Tammany Hall gained its name from Delaware Chief Tamanend, known for the assistance and kindness he granted to early colonial settlers. From these actions, Chief Tamanend became commonly known as a patron saint of America, with the Tammany Society of New York adopting the names "Saint Tammany Society" in honor of Chief Tamamend, or the "Columbian Order", for Christopher Columbus. The organization structure of the Tammany Society was based in Indigenous culture and 45 societal practices. The leaders of the organization were called "Sachem" or "Sagamore", Algonquin names for a leader, and their meeting room was called the "Wigwam", from the Algonquin word for house. While the namesake for Tammany Hall is 46 not widely known, this is an organization that continues to give acknowledgement to the Indigenous peoples to which the land belonged, even if only in name.

In the late 19th century, early skyscrapers started to shape the city's skyline to accommodate its fast growth, churches such as Trinity Church were no longer the tallest structures in the city.

=== Early 20th century: 1898–1945 ===
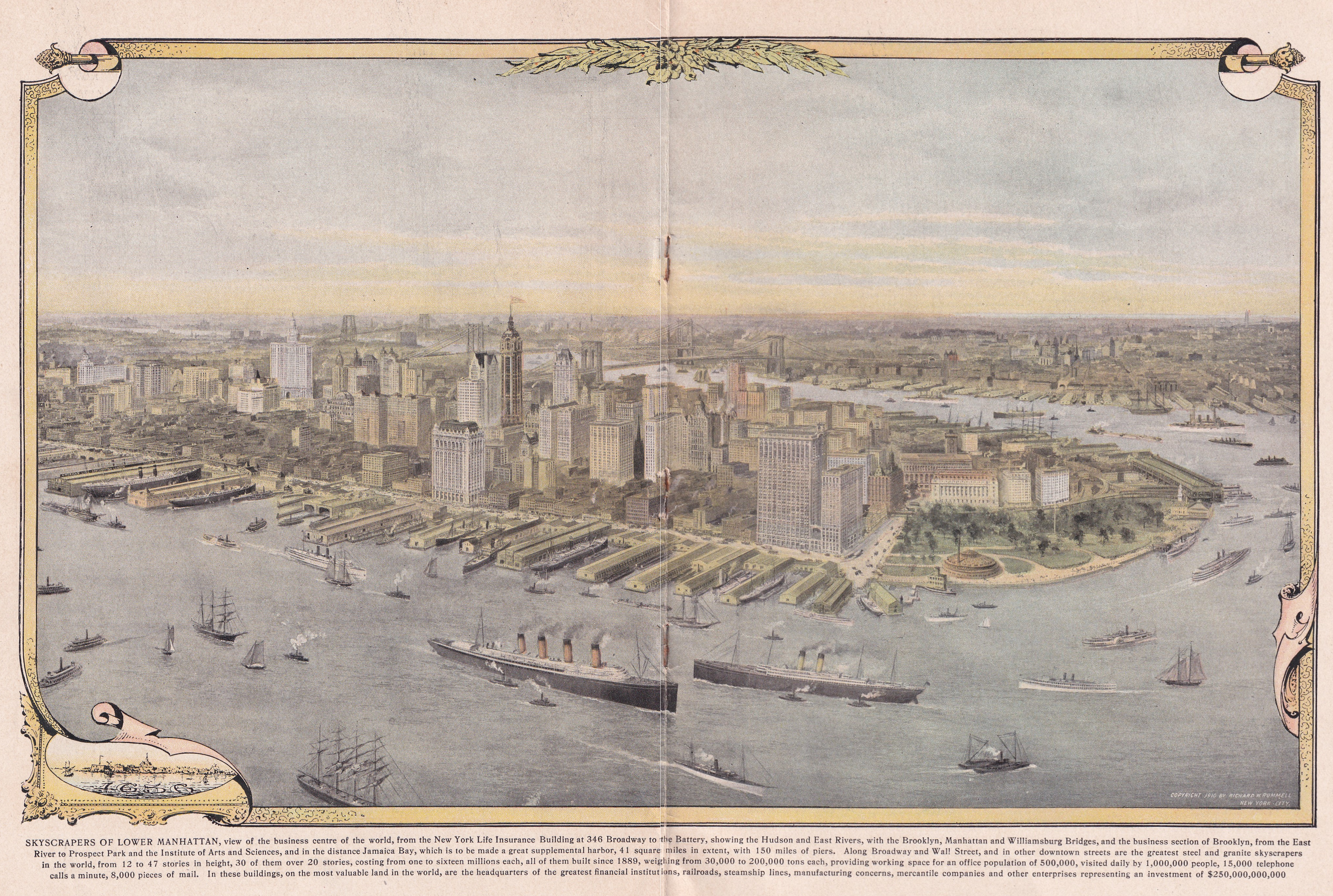
King's Color-graphs of New York City (1910)

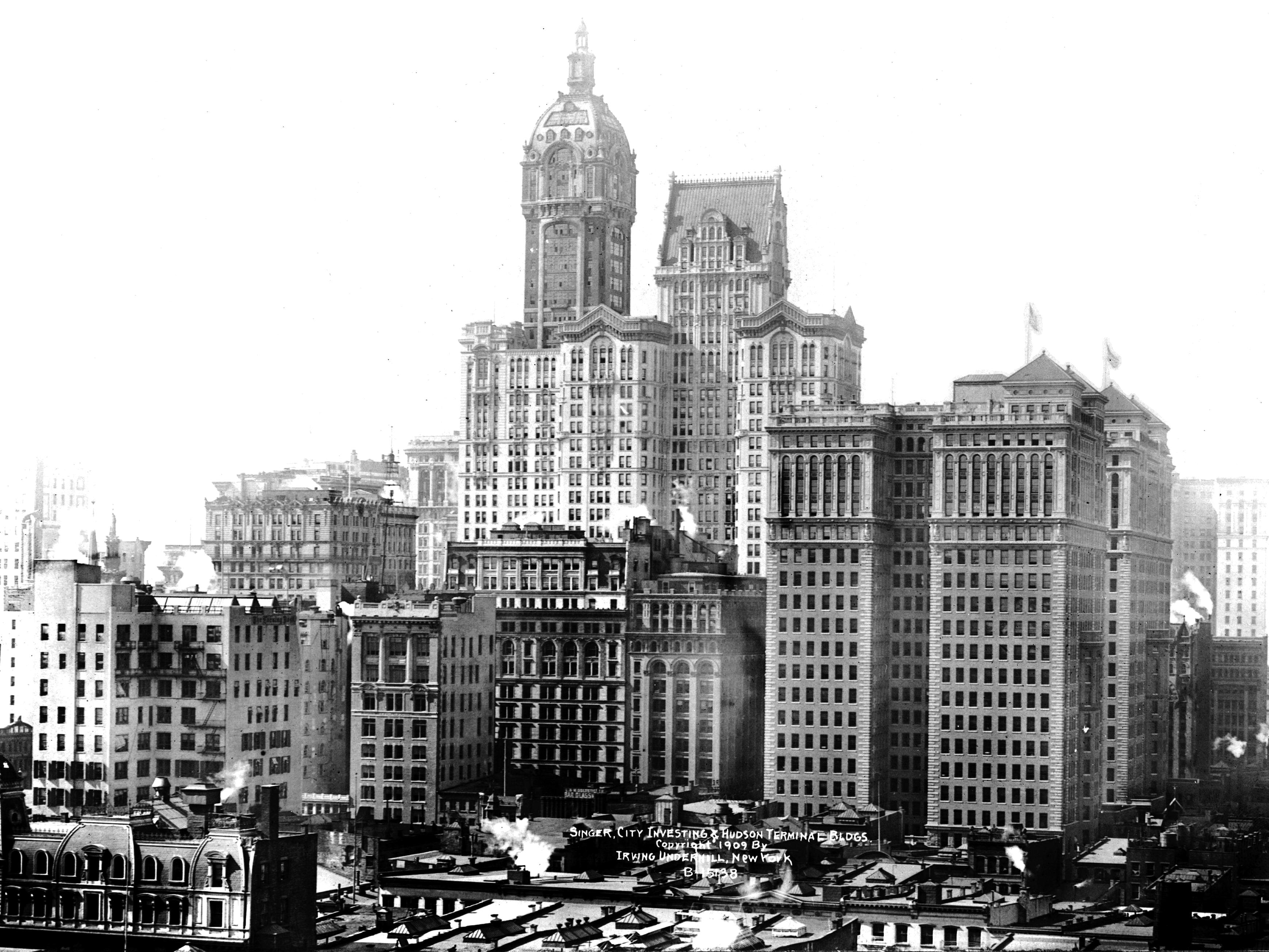
New York's Singer Building was the world's tallest building when completed in 1908. It was demolished in 1968.

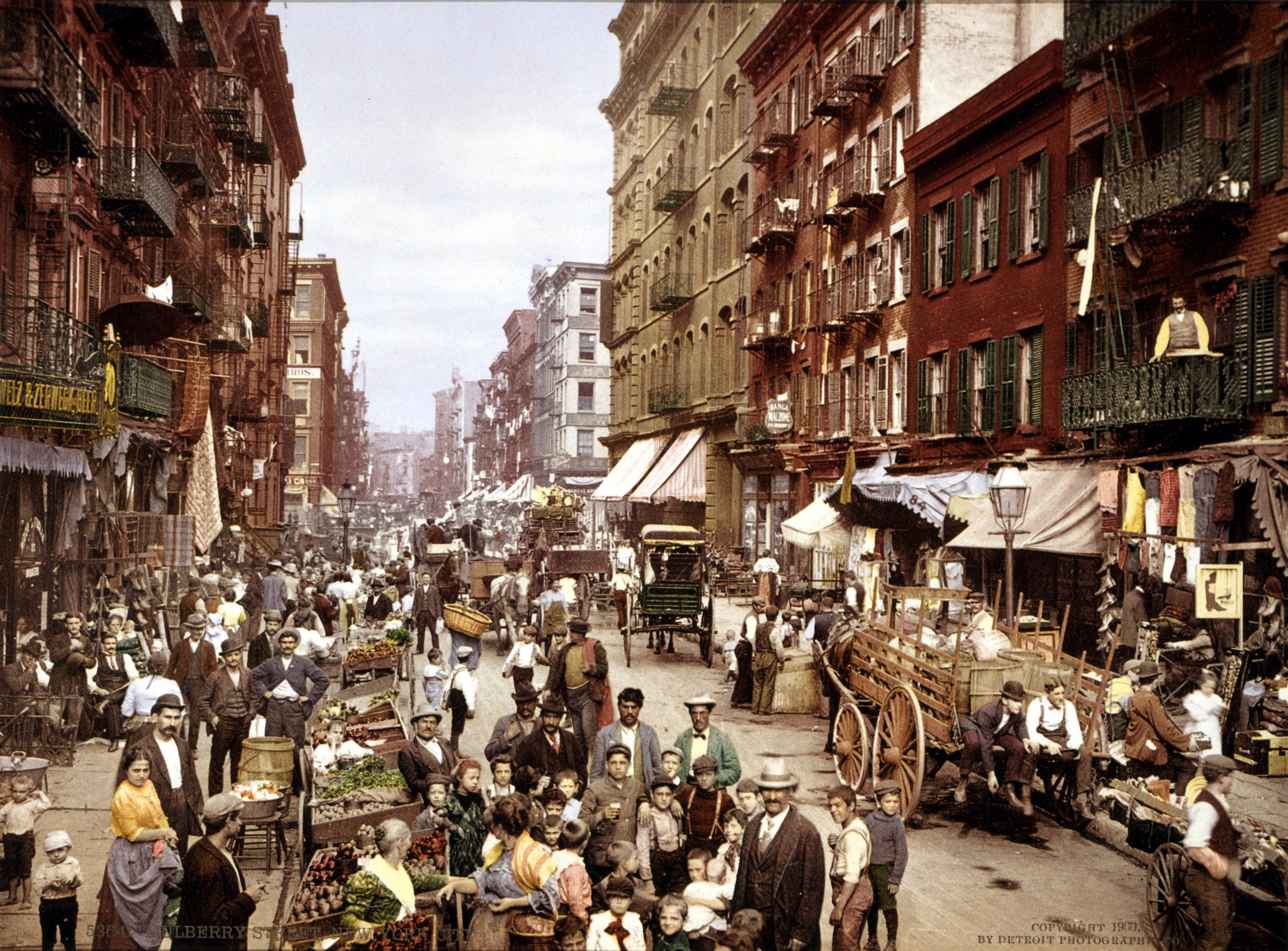
Mulberry Street, on the Lower East Side, circa 1900

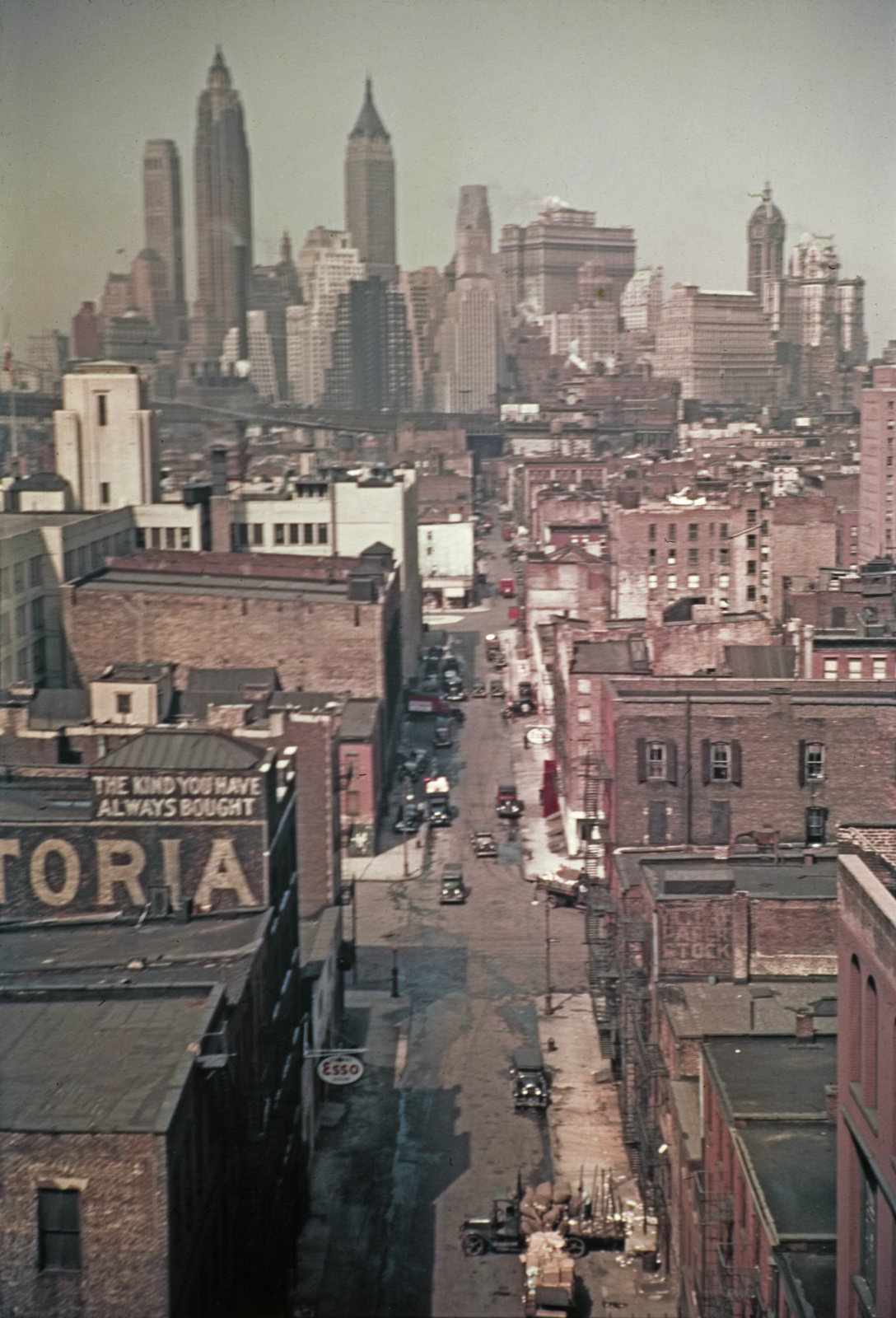
The Lower East Side and Lower Manhattan skyline in New York City photographed using Agfacolor process in 1938.

From 1890 to 1930, the largest cities, led by New York, were the focus of international attention. The skyscrapers and tourist attractions were widely publicized. Suburbs were emerging as bedroom communities for commuters to the central city. San Francisco dominated the West, Atlanta dominated the South, Boston dominated New England; Chicago dominated the Midwest United States. New York City dominated the entire nation in terms of communications, trade, finance, popular culture, and high culture. More than a fourth of the 300 largest corporations in 1920 were headquartered here.

In 1898, the modern City of New York was formed with the consolidation of Brooklyn (until then an independent city), Manhattan, and outlying areas. Manhattan and the Bronx were established as two separate boroughs and joined with three other boroughs created from parts of adjacent counties to form the new municipal government originally called "Greater New York". The Borough of Brooklyn incorporated the independent City of Brooklyn, recently joined to Manhattan by the Brooklyn Bridge; the Borough of Queens was created from western Queens County (with the remnant established as Nassau County in 1899); and the Borough of Richmond contained all of Richmond County. Municipal governments contained within the boroughs were abolished, and the county governmental functions were absorbed by the city or each borough. In 1914, the New York State Legislature created Bronx County, making five counties coterminous with the five boroughs.

The Bronx had a steady boom period during 1898–1929, with a population growth by a factor of six from 200,000 in 1900 to 1.3 million in 1930. The Great Depression created a surge of unemployment, especially among the working class, and a slow-down of growth.

On June 15, 1904, over 1,000 people, mostly German immigrant women and children, were killed when the excursion steamship General Slocum caught fire and sank. It is the city's worst maritime disaster. On March 25, 1911, the Triangle Shirtwaist Factory fire in Greenwich Village took the lives of 146 garment workers. In response, the city made great advancements in the fire department, building codes, and workplace regulations.

Throughout the first half of the 20th century, the city became a world center for industry, commerce, and communication, marking its rising influence with such events as the Hudson-Fulton Celebration of 1909. Interborough Rapid Transit (the first New York City Subway company) began operating in 1904, and the railroads operating out of Grand Central Terminal and Pennsylvania Station thrived.

From 1918 to 1920, New York City was affected by the largest rent strike wave in its history. Somewhere between several tens of thousands and hundreds of thousands of tenants went on strike across the city. A WW1 housing and coal shortage sparked the strikes. It became marked both by occasional violent scuffles and the Red Scare. It would lead to the passage of the first rent laws in the nation's history.

The skyscraper epitomized New York's success of the early 20th century; it was home to the tallest building between 1908 and 1974.

The city was a destination for internal migrants as well as immigrants. Through 1940, New York was a major destination for African Americans during the Great Migration from the rural American South. The Harlem Renaissance flourished during the 1920s and the era of Prohibition. New York's ever accelerating changes and rising crime and poverty rates were reduced after World War I disrupted trade routes, the Immigration Restriction Acts limited additional immigration after the war, and the Great Depression reduced the need for new labor. The combination ended the rule of the Gilded Age barons. As the city's demographics temporarily stabilized, labor unionization helped the working class gain new protections and middle-class affluence, the city's government and infrastructure underwent a dramatic overhaul under Fiorello La Guardia, and his controversial parks commissioner, Robert Moses, ended the blight of many tenement areas, expanded new parks, remade streets, and restricted and reorganized zoning controls.

For a while, New York ranked as the most populous city in the world, overtaking London in 1925, which had reigned for a century. During the difficult years of the Great Depression, the reformer Fiorello La Guardia was elected as mayor, and Tammany Hall fell after eighty years of political dominance.

Despite the effects of the Great Depression, some of the world's tallest skyscrapers were built during the 1930s. Art Deco architecture—such as the iconic Chrysler Building, Empire State Building, and 30 Rockefeller Plaza— came to define the city's skyline. The construction of the Rockefeller Center occurred in the 1930s and was the largest-ever private development project at the time. Both before and especially after World War II, vast areas of the city were also reshaped by the construction of bridges, parks and parkways coordinated by Robert Moses, the greatest proponent of automobile-centered modernist urbanism in America.

=== Post–World War II: 1946–1977 ===
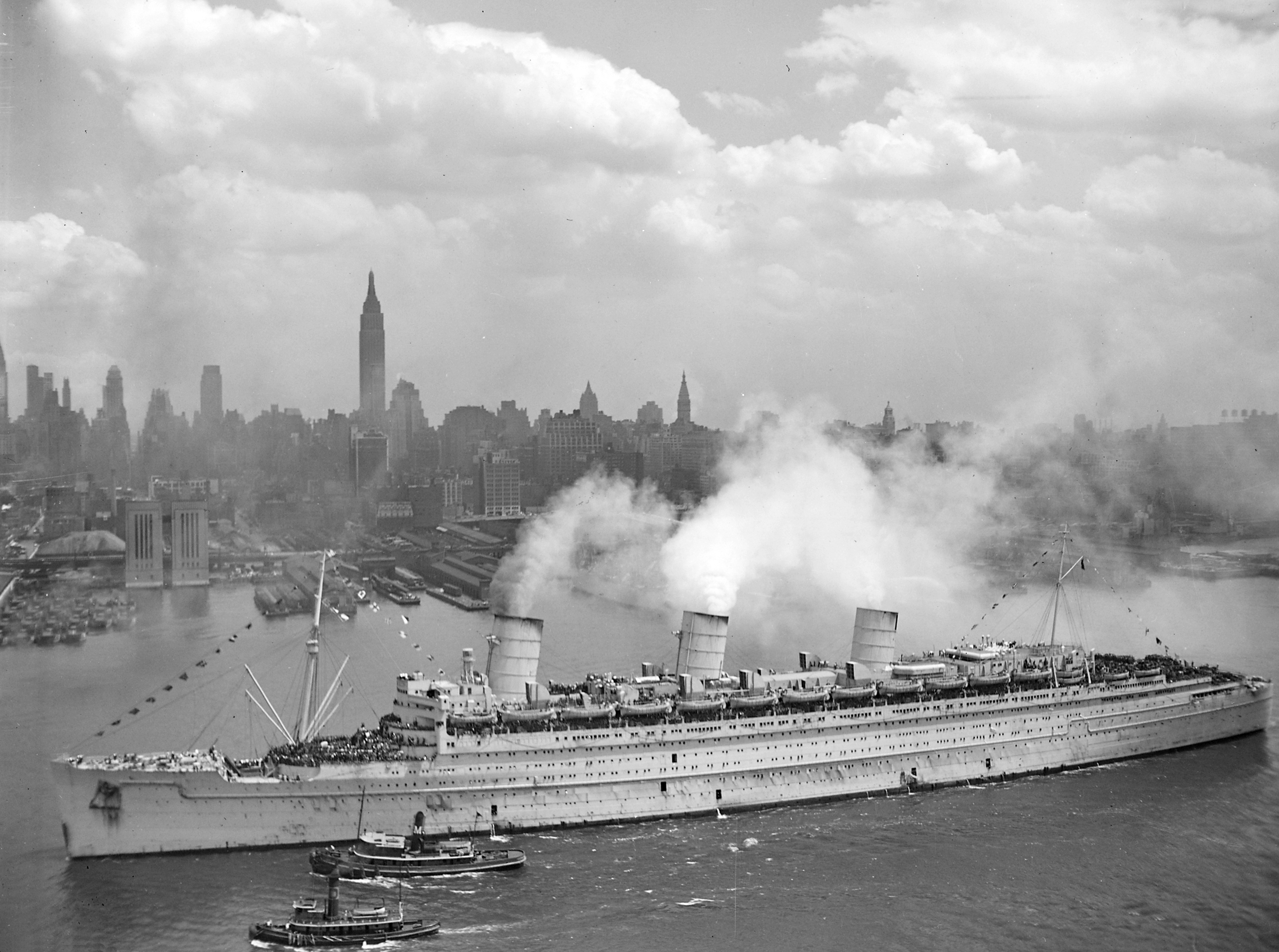
RMS Queen Mary arriving in New York Harbor with thousands of U.S. troops

Returning World War II veterans and immigrants from Europe created a postwar economic boom. Demands for new housing were aided by the G.I. Bill for veterans, stimulating the development of huge suburban tracts in eastern Queens and Nassau County. The city was extensively photographed during the post–war years by photographer Todd Webb.

New York emerged from the war as the leading city of the world, with Wall Street leading the United States ascendancy. In 1951, the United Nations relocated from its first headquarters in Flushing Meadows Park, Queens, to the East Side of Manhattan. During the late 1960s, the views of real estate developer and city leader Robert Moses began to fall out of favor as the anti-urban renewal views of Jane Jacobs gained popularity. Citizen rebellion stopped a plan to construct an expressway through Lower Manhattan.

After a short war boom, the Bronx declined from 1950 to 1985, going from predominantly moderate-income to mostly lower-income, with high rates of violent crime and poverty. The Bronx has experienced an economic and developmental resurgence starting in the late 1980s that continues into today.

The transition away from the industrial base toward a service economy picked up speed, while the jobs in the large shipbuilding and garment industries declined sharply. The ports converted to container ships, costing many traditional jobs among longshoremen. Many large corporations moved their headquarters to the suburbs or to distant cities. At the same time, there was enormous growth in services, especially finance, education, medicine, tourism, communications and law. New York remained the largest city and largest metropolitan area in the United States, and continued as its largest financial, commercial, information, and cultural center.

Like many major U.S. cities, New York suffered race riots, gang wars and some population decline in the late 1960s. Street activists and minority groups such as the Black Panthers and Young Lords organized rent strikes and garbage offensives, demanding improved city services for poor areas. They also set up free health clinics and other programs, as a guide for organizing and gaining "Power to the People." By the 1970s the city had gained a reputation as a crime-ridden relic of history. In 1975, the city government avoided bankruptcy only through a federal loan and debt restructuring by the Municipal Assistance Corporation, headed by Felix Rohatyn. The city was also forced to accept increased financial scrutiny by an agency of New York State. In 1977, the city was struck by the New York City blackout of 1977 and serial slayings by the Son of Sam. Ed Koch became mayor in 1978.

=== 1978–present ===
The 1980s began a rebirth of Wall Street, and the city reclaimed its role at the center of the worldwide financial industry. Unemployment and crime remained high, the latter reaching peak levels in some categories around the close of the decade and the beginning of the 1990s. Neighborhood restoration projects funded by the city and state had very good effects for New York, especially Bedford-Stuyvesant, Harlem, and The Bronx. The city later resumed its social and economic recovery, bolstered by the influx of Asians, Latin Americans, and U.S. citizens, and by new crime-fighting techniques on the part of the New York Police Department. In 1989, David Dinkins became the city's first Black mayor. He came out of the Gang of Four.

Rudy Giuliani became mayor in 1994. In the late 1990s, the city benefited from the nationwide fall of violent crime rates, the resurgence of the finance industry, and the growth of the "Silicon Alley", during the dot com boom, one of the factors in a decade of booming real estate values. New York was also able to attract more business and convert abandoned industrialized neighborhoods into arts or attractive residential neighborhoods; examples include the Meatpacking District and Chelsea (in Manhattan) and Williamsburg (in Brooklyn).

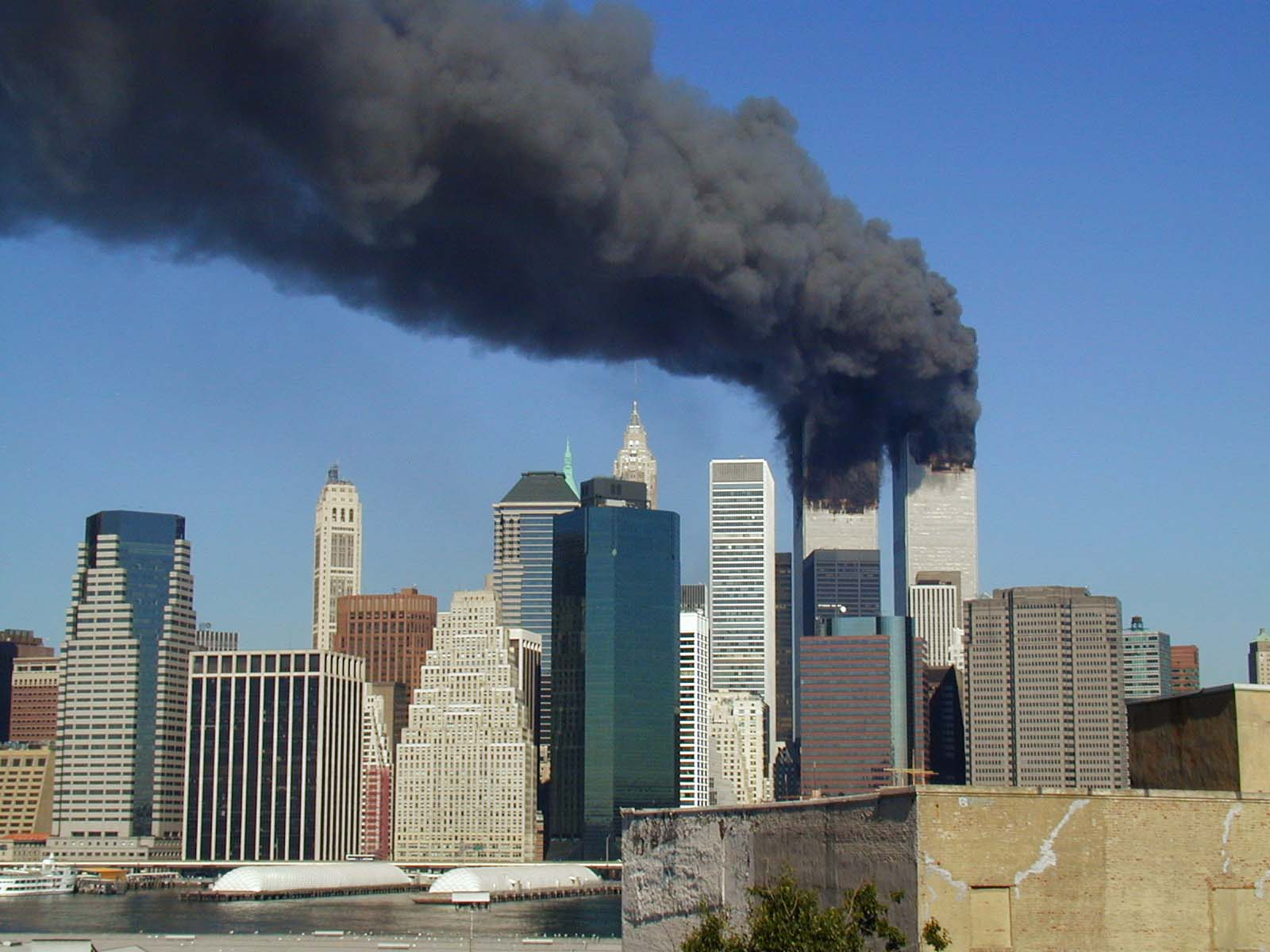
Lower Manhattan on September 11, 2001, after terrorists flew planes into the World Trade Center towers

New York's population reached an all-time high in the 2000 census; according to census estimates since 2000, the city has continued to grow, including rapid growth in the most urbanized borough, Manhattan. During this period, New York City was a site of the September 11 attacks of 2001; 2,606 people who were in the towers and in the surrounding area were killed by a terrorist attack on the World Trade Center, an event considered highly traumatic for the city but which did not stop the city's rapid regrowth. On November 3, 2014, One World Trade Center opened on the site of the attack.

Michael Bloomberg became mayor in 2002. The Occupy Wall Street protest movement happened in New York City in 2011. Hurricane Sandy brought a destructive storm surge to New York in the evening of October 29, 2012, flooding numerous streets, tunnels, and subway lines in Lower Manhattan. It flooded low-lying areas of Brooklyn, Queens, and Staten Island. Electrical power was lost in many parts of the city and its suburbs.

Bill de Blasio became mayor in 2014. Despite efforts to promote equity, the racial achievement gap in New York City's public schools widened during his time in office. While the administration invested in programs to address homelessness, the number of homeless individuals remained high and was a consistent point of criticism. De Blasio had a strained relationship with the city's police unions, particularly in the wake of protests against police brutality. His signature achievement was providing free, full-day pre-kindergarten to all of the city's four-year-olds. De Blasio set ambitious goals for creating and preserving affordable housing units through his "Housing New York" plan. De Blasio implemented various programs aimed at addressing inequalities in the public school system, including expanding access to computer science, AP classes, and college access programs in all high schools.

The city went into lockdown in March 2020 amidst the first wave of the COVID-19 pandemic. As of December 2021, New York City had experienced the most deaths of any locality in the coronavirus pandemic in New York state, which itself has the highest number of confirmed coronavirus cases of any state in the United States. During the first wave, one-third of total known U.S. cases were in New York City.

Eric Adams became mayor in 2022. In 2024, Adams became the first New York City mayor to be indicted on criminal charges. He has been federally charged with corruption and bribery.

Zohran Mamdani became the first Muslim and Asian American mayor of New York City in 2026. Mamdani won an upset victory in the 2025 Democratic mayoral primary against Governor Andrew Cuomo, and was elected in the 2025 mayoral race against Cuomo and Republican nominee Curtis Sliwa.

Modern Indigenous Demographics in New York City

New York City holds "the single largest concentration of Native people in the United States", with the city maintaining a strong "indigenous foundation". Currently, around 100,000 registered members of Indigenous communities live within New York City. Around 2% of New York City's population identifies as Indigenous American. Lenape people now primarily reside within the Delaware Tribe of Oklahoma, the Delaware Nation of Oklahoma, and the Stockbridge-Munsee Community of Wisconsin, within the United States and with the Munsee-Delaware Nation, Moravian of the Thames First Nation, and the Delaware First Nation of the Six Nations of the Grand River in Ontario in Canada as a result of the Lenape Diaspora caused by Dutch, British, and American colonization.

Across New York City, Indigenous landmarks still remain. These include Broadway, Astor Place, Bowling Green, and Greenwich Village, among others. These Indigenous landmarks were important in the development of modern Manhattan by Dutch and English colonists, being renamed before their continued modern use.

== See also ==
- American urban history
- Timeline of New York City
- African Americans in New York City
- History of education in New York City
- History of public health in New York City
- Here Grows New York – film history of city from 1609 to present
- Gentrification of New York City

Boroughs

- History of the Bronx
- History of Brooklyn
- History of Queens
- History of Staten Island
- History of Manhattan

Streets and thoroughfares

- History of Fifth Avenue
- History of Broadway
- History of Wall Street

Small islands

- Hart Island
- Rikers Island
- Randall's Island
- Liberty Island
- Governors Island
- City Island
- Roosevelt Island
- Ellis Island – New Jersey/NYC

Miscellany

- New-York Historical Society
- Museum of the City of New York
- New York: A Documentary Film
- New York City water supply system
- Timeline of New York City crimes and disasters
- Kenneth T. Jackson — historian
- List of newspapers in New York in the 18th century
