= Cloudland Canyon (band) =

American experimental/psychedelic rock band

- Origin: New York, United States
- Genres: experimental rock, psychedelic rock
- Years active: 2000–present
- Labels: Tee Pee, Holy Mountain, Kranky, Not Not Fun, The Great Pop Supplement, Sonic Cathedral, Light In The Attic

Cloudland Canyon is an experimental rock/psychedelic rock band originally from New York, USA.

Cloudland Canyon was formed in 2002 by Kip Uhlhorn and Simon Wojan (a German citizen). After several years of long-distance collaboration (and recording sessions held in the US and Germany, the first Cloudland Canyon release, Requiems Der Natur, 2002-2004 was released by Tee Pee in 2006 and was largely a collection of older works and experiments. Cloudland Canyon quickly set about releasing a number of other releases and touring that same year, most notably a single track collaboration 12"/LP entitled Exterminating Angel with Chicago musician Lichens in 2007 on Holy Mountain.

In 2007, the band was signed to Kranky and released their first proper album Silver Tongued Sisyphus. In 2008, the band released another collaborative 12" with Mythical Beast on Not Not Fun, as well as their second full-length, Lie in Light on Kranky. The latter was chosen as one of top 25 albums of the year 2008 by the Magnet magazine. Cloudland Canyon subsequently moved to Holy Mountain, where the band began their own imprint of Holy Mountain (Intercoastal Artists) for 2010's album Fin Eaves, which has become their best-received work to date, landing on numerous year-end lists. They went on tour with the Flaming Lips (who also asked the band to collaborate with them) as well as with Interpol and Bear in Heaven. Members of the Arcade Fire even name checked the band

Uhlhorn has also played in several other successful groups and bands during this time, including King Khan & the Shrines, Panthers (Dim Mak, Vice/Atlantic Records), Pharaohs (100% Silk, Stone's Throw, Intercoastal Artists), Eden Express (Holy Mountain), and Tav Falco's Panther Burns. He has also played guitar live and on albums by Rhys Chatham and Glenn Branca, including Chatham's Crimson Grail, which was staged at Lincoln Center. Cloudland Canyon's ranks have included close friend Jerry Fuchs (also drummer for !!!, LCD Soundsystem, Maserati, Turing Machine, Moby) who died in 2009. Most recently, Memphis drummer Ross Johnson (Tav Falco's Panther Burns, Alex Chilton) has joined the band.

Cloudland Canyon continues to release records with musical reference points in krautrock repetition and drone, shoegaze haze and even cosmic disco.

Recently, Uhlhorn and Cloudland Canyon have begun working with Sonic Boom (Pete Kember) formerly of the band Spacemen 3 and currently of Spectrum, and Experimental Audio Research. 2012 saw Cloudland Canyon collaborate with longtime friend Robert A.A. Lowe/Lichens on the score for the film Miss Lovely directed by Ashim Ahluwalia which won the "Un Certain Regard" prize at the 2012 Cannes Film Festival. The band also contributed music to visual artist Doug Aitken's iPad/iPhone app entitled “Altered Earth”. In 2013, Cloudland Canyon began work on a new album in the latter half of the year with Sonic Boom (whose production credits include MGMT, Panda Bear) producing and mixing the album which is set to be released in 2014.
