= Maserati (band) =

American rock band

- Origin: Athens, Georgia, United States
- Genres: Post-rock, space rock, psychedelic rock
- Years active: 2000–present
- Label: Temporary Residence Limited
- Members: Coley Dennis; Matt Cherry; Chris McNeal; Mike Albanese
- Past members: Jerry Fuchs; A.E. Paterra; Phil Horan; Josh McCauley; Tristan Wraight; Steve Scarborough

Maserati is a band formed in 2000 in Athens, Georgia. They are currently signed to Temporary Residence Limited.

== History ==
Coley Dennis, Matt Cherry, Steve Scarborough and Phil Horan began making music together in January 2000 and in June played their first show at the now-defunct Above Bookstore in Athens, Georgia. That October they recorded and self-released their debut album, 37:29:24. In 2001 the band signed with Kindercore Records and toured the US over the next several years. Their second album The Language of Cities was released in 2002 followed by Confines Of Heat (split with Gainesville, FL's The Mercury Program) in 2003 - both released by Kindercore. Shortly thereafter Athens-based Hello Sir Records released the Towers Were Wires 7" and a split CD with Cinemechanica and We Versus the Shark. Cherry left the group temporarily in 2003, replaced by Tristan Wraight. Following a 2004 Japan tour with MONO, Horan left the group and the band went on hiatus for a year.

In 2005, the band reconvened with Jerry Fuchs stepping in on drums and Cherry re-joining on guitar. Maserati toured the US and Europe throughout 2006 and 2007, playing with bands such as !!!, Battles, and Black Moth Super Rainbow. The band signed with Temporary Residence in 2007, releasing their third album Inventions for the New Season later that year followed by the Inventions Remixes 12" featuring remixes by Tim Goldsworthy and Justin Van Der Volgen. In 2008 Scarborough left the group and was replaced by bassist Chris McNeal (Some Soviet Station, Vincas). In early 2009 Temporary Residence released the Maserati/Zombi split LP, followed by the rarities collection Passages later that year. Throughout 2008 and 2009 the band wrote and recorded material for a new full-length between tours supporting both MONO and STS9.

On November 8, 2009, Fuchs died suddenly after falling down an elevator shaft in Williamsburg, Brooklyn. ABC reported that he "was trying to jump out of a broken elevator when a piece of his clothing caught on something". He was 34 years old.

Throughout the following year, Dennis, Cherry and McNeal worked to finish the album they had started recording with Fuchs (his drum tracks were recorded just three months before his death). On November 8, 2010 (exactly a year after Fuchs' death) Temporary Residence released the band's fourth full-length album Pyramid of the Sun along with the limited-run Pyramid of the Moon 12" containing an additional dance track as well as a remix by The Field. The band toured the US and Europe throughout 2010 and 2011 with A.E. Paterra filling-in on drums.

The band wrote most of the songs on 2012's Maserati VII initially with an Oberheim DMX drum machine but recruited Mike Albanese (Cinemechanica, Shannon Wright, Bit Brigade) to play many of the drum parts in the studio. The album features Steve Moore who both mixed the record and played synthesizers. The band toured Europe in 2013 and Asia in 2014 to support VII's release.

The band wrote, recorded and mixed its next album entirely at Albanese's studio in Athens, GA. Rehumanizer was subsequently released in November 2015 followed by a handful of live shows in the US and Europe. In 2016 Dennis moved permanently to Lausanne, Switzerland.

Throughout 2017 and 2019, the band continued to write new material, trading files and demos remotely and occasionally playing together weeks at a time in both the US and in Switzerland.

Their next album Enter the Mirror, recorded in Athens and mixed by John Congleton, was released in Spring 2020 in tandem with the band's twenty-year anniversary.

In April 2022, it was announced that Mason Brown was joining as a writing member in the band.

== Band members ==
Current

- Coley Dennis – guitars (2000–present)
- Matt Cherry – guitars (2000–present)
- Chris McNeal – bass (2008–present)
- Mike Albanese – drums (2012–present)

Former

- Steve Scarborough – bass (2000–2008)
- Phil Horan – drums (2000–2004)
- Jerry Fuchs – drums (2005–2009; died 2009)

Touring

- Tristan Wraight – guitars (2006–2007)
- Josh McCauley – guitars (2008–2009)
- A.E. Paterra – drums (2010–2011)

== Discography ==
- 37:29:24 (2000, self-released)
- The Language of Cities (2002, Kindercore)
- The Language of Cities + 2 - Japan release (2003, Human Highway)
- Maserati / The Mercury Program - Confines Of Heat EP+DVD (2003, Kindercore)
- Maserati / The Mercury Program - Confines of Heat LP (2003, Hello Sir)
- Towers Were Wires/Asymmetrical Threats 7" (2004, Hello Sir)
- Maserati / Cinemechanica / We Versus the Shark - Split EP (2004, Hello Sir)
- Inventions for the New Season (2007, Temporary Residence)
- Inventions Remixes 12" ( Temporary Residence, 2008)
- Split with Zombi (Temporary Residence, 2009)
- Passages (Temporary Residence, 2009)
- Pyramid of the Moon 12" (Temporary Residence, 2010)
- Pyramid of the Sun LP (Temporary Residence, 2010)
- Maserati VII (Temporary Residence, 2012)
- Rehumanizer (Temporary Residence, 2015)
- Enter the Mirror (Temporary Residence, 2020)
