= Inventions for the New Season =

Studio album by Maserati
- Released: 2007
- Genre: Post-rock
- Length: 46:51
- Label: Temporary Residence

Maserati chronology
The Language of Cities (2002)	Inventions for the New Season (2007)	Pyramid of the Sun (2010)

Professional ratings
Review scores
Source	Rating
AllMusic	4/5 stars
Pitchfork Media	4.4/10

Inventions for the New Season is an album by Maserati, released in 2007. The song "Show Me the Season" was featured in the trailer for Project Natal. The song "This Is a Sight We Had One Day from the High Mountain" was used in a series of tv spots for the second season of Star Wars: The Clone Wars.

== Track listing ==
1. "Inventions" (9:42)
2. "12/16" (5:43)
3. "Kalimera" (4:11)
4. "Synchronicity IV" (7:13)
5. "This Is a Sight We Had One Day from the High Mountain" (2:52)
6. "Show Me the Season" (9:21)
7. "Kalinichta" (1:46)
8. "The World Outside" (5:40)
