= Turing Machine (band) =

American instrumental rock band

- Origin: New York City, New York, United States
- Genres: Post-rock, instrumental rock, math rock
- Years active: 1998 – present
- Labels: Frenchkiss Records, Jade Tree Records
- Members: Scott de Simon
- Past members: Jerry Fuchs; Justin Chearno

Turing Machine is an American instrumental rock band formed in New York City, United States, in 1998 by Justin Chearno and Scott DeSimon, late of DC's noise-rockers Pitchblende and Gerhardt 'Jerry' Fuchs, who had moved to New York to play with Bitch Magnet guitarist Jon Fine's new band, Vineland. Their music has been described as "Angular instrumental indie rock," that has "influences as vast as vintage prog, Krautrock and post-punk."

On November 7, 2009, drummer Fuchs died in an elevator shaft accident. The last of Fuchs' studio work with Turing Machine was included posthumously in the 2012 album, What Is The Meaning of What. Some of the friends of the band such as Pat Mahoney of LCD Soundsystem and Brian Chase helped to complete the unfinished album after Fuchs' death. Chearno died in August 2024.

The name comes from the mathematical model of computation defined by Alan Turing with the same name (Turing machine).

== Discography ==
- A New Machine for Living (2000)
- Juncture (2003, appears on)
- Zwei (2004)
- What Is The Meaning of What (2012)
