= List of Siouxsie and the Banshees members =

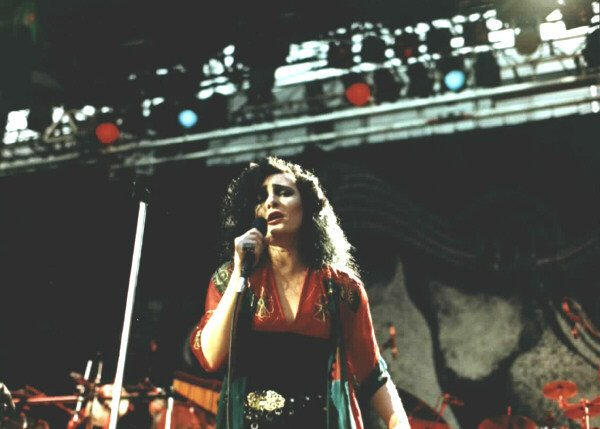
Siouxsie Sioux performing live with the Banshees at Lollapalooza in 1991.

Siouxsie and the Banshees were a British rock band. Formed in September 1976, the group originally consisted of vocalist Siouxsie Sioux, bassist Steven Severin, guitarist Marco Pirroni and drummer Sid Vicious. The first recording line-up featured John McKay and Kenny Morris in place of Pirroni and Vicious. Siouxsie and Severin were members throughout the band's entire lifetime, alongside drummer Budgie who joined in 1979, and a rotating cast of guitarists including John McGeoch and Robert Smith. The band broke up in 1996 but reformed for a tour in 2002 with a line-up of Siouxsie, Severin, Budgie, and guitarist Knox Chandler.

== History ==
Vocalist Siouxsie Sioux (real name Susan Ballion) and bassist Steven Severin (real name Steven Bailey) formed Siouxsie and the Banshees in September 1976, debuting with a line-up including guitarist Marco Pirroni and drummer Sid Vicious (real name John Ritchie). Two months after the performance, Pirroni and Vicious were replaced by Peter Fenton and Kenny Morris, respectively, although Fenton was sacked after a live show the following May due to stylistic differences with the other members. By July he had been replaced by John McKay, who also contributed saxophone to the group. The line-up of Siouxsie, McKay, Severin and Morris released two studio albums – 1978's The Scream and 1979's Join Hands – before McKay and Morris both left suddenly on the eve of the start of a UK tour in September 1979.

The tour resumed a few weeks later with the Cure frontman Robert Smith and the Slits drummer Budgie (real name Peter Clarke) substituting for the departed members. Budgie subsequently became a full-time member of the band, while John McGeoch joined as McKay's permanent replacement early the following year. He became an official member in July. McGeoch performed on Kaleidoscope, Juju and A Kiss in the Dreamhouse, before he was fired at the beginning of November 1982 due to problems with alcohol abuse which resulted in his hospitalisation. The vacated guitarist spot was again taken by Robert Smith. The Cure frontman became a full member of the Banshees, contributing to 1984's Hyæna, before leaving three weeks before its tour due to "nervous strain and exhaustion".

Smith was replaced by former Clock DVA guitarist John Valentine Carruthers, who performed on The Thorn and Tinderbox before leaving in February 1987 due to disagreements with the rest of the band. The band became a quintet in July 1987 when a new line-up was unveiled with Jon Klein on guitars alongside multi-instrumentalist Martin McCarrick on keyboards, cello and accordion. This line-up remained stable for almost eight years, before Klein was replaced by former Psychedelic Furs guitarist Knox Chandler for the tour in support of 1995's The Rapture. After a final run of live shows, Siouxsie and the Banshees disbanded in April 1996. Siouxsie, Severin, Budgie and Chandler reformed the Banshees for a final tour in 2002, which spawned the live release The Seven Year Itch.

== Members ==
Image	Name	Years active	Instruments	Release contributions
	Siouxsie Sioux (Susan Ballion)	1976–1996; 2002	vocals; guitar (occasional); keyboards (occasional); percussion (occasional) • melodica (1980) • vocoder (1981)	all Siouxsie and the Banshees releases
	Steven Severin (Steven Bailey)	1976–1996; 2002	bass; keyboards; guitar (occasional); backing vocals (occasional) • electric sitar, drum machine, programming (1980) • trumpet (1982)	all Siouxsie and the Banshees releases
	Sid Vicious (Simon John Ritchie)	1976 (1st show only) (died 1979)	drums	none
	Marco Pirroni	1976 (1st show only)	guitar	none
	Peter Fenton	1976–1977	guitar	none
	Kenny Morris	1977–1979 (died 2026)	drums; percussion	all Siouxsie and the Banshees releases from "Hong Kong Garden" (1978) to "Mittageisen" (1979); The Peel Sessions (1987); The Peel Sessions: The Second Session (1989); At the BBC (2009)
	John McKay	1977–1979	guitar; saxophone; xylophone (1978)	all Siouxsie and the Banshees releases from "Hong Kong Garden" (1978) to "Mittageisen" (1979); The Peel Sessions (1987); The Peel Sessions: The Second Session (1989); At the BBC (2009)
	Budgie (Peter Clarke)	1979–1996; 2002	drums; percussion; harmonica (occasional); keyboards (occasional); bass guitar (occasional); backing vocals (occasional) • marimba (1983-1984)	all Siouxsie and the Banshees releases from Kaleidoscope (1980) onwards, except The Peel Sessions EPs
	Robert Smith	1979 (touring substitute); 1982–1984	guitar; keyboards • percussion (1982)	"Dear Prudence" (1983); Nocturne (1983); Hyæna (1984); At the BBC (2009)
	John McGeoch	1980–1982 (died 2004)	guitar; keyboards; saxophone; backing vocals (occasional) • sitar (1980) • recorder (1982)	all Siouxsie and the Banshees releases from Kaleidoscope (1980) to A Kiss in the Dreamhouse (1982); At the BBC (2009)
	John Valentine Carruthers	1984–1987	guitar; keyboards	The Thorn (1984); Tinderbox (1986); Through the Looking Glass (1987); At the BBC (2009)
	Martin McCarrick	1987–1996	keyboards; accordion; cello; dulcimer; violin	all Siouxsie and the Banshees releases from Through the Looking Glass (1987) to "New Skin" (1995), except The Peel Sessions: The Second Session (1989); At the BBC (2009)
	Jon Klein	1987–1994	guitar	all Siouxsie and the Banshees releases from "Song from the Edge of the World" (1987) to The Rapture (1995), except The Peel Sessions: The Second Session (1989); At the BBC (2009)
	Knox Chandler	1995–1996; 2002	guitar	"New Skin" (1995); The Seven Year Itch (2003)

== Lineups ==
Period	Members	Releases
September 1976	Siouxsie Sioux – vocals; Marco Pirroni – guitar; Steven Severin – bass; Sid Vicious – drums	none – one live performance only
February 1977 – May 1977	Siouxsie Sioux – vocals; Peter Fenton – guitar; Steven Severin – bass; Kenny Morris – drums, percussion	none – live performances only
July 1977 – September 1979	Siouxsie Sioux – vocals, piano; John McKay – guitar, saxophone, xylophone; Steven Severin – bass, backing vocals, guitar, keyboards; Kenny Morris – drums, percussion	"Hong Kong Garden" (1978); The Scream (1978); "The Staircase (Mystery)" (1979); Join Hands (1979); "Mittageisen" (1979); The Peel Sessions (1987); The Peel Sessions: The Second Session (1989)
September – October 1979	Siouxsie Sioux – vocals; Steven Severin – bass; Robert Smith – guitar (substitute); Budgie – drums (substitute)	none – live performances only
Early 1980 – October 1982	Siouxsie Sioux – vocals, guitar, keyboards, percussion, melodica, vocoder; John McGeoch – guitar, keyboards, saxophone, backing vocals, recorder, sitar; Steven Severin – bass, keyboards, guitar, backing vocals, drum machine, programming; Budgie – drums, percussion, harmonica, bass, backing vocals	Kaleidoscope (1980); "Israel" (1980); Juju (1981); "Fireworks" (1982); A Kiss in the Dreamhouse (1982)
November 1982 – May 1984	Siouxsie Sioux – vocals, guitar, tambourine; Robert Smith – guitar, keyboards, percussion; Steven Severin – bass, keyboards, trumpet; Budgie – drums, percussion, marimba	"Dear Prudence" (1983); Nocturne (1983); Hyæna (1984)
June 1984 – February 1987	Siouxsie Sioux – vocals, percussion; John Valentine Carruthers – guitar, keyboards; Steven Severin – bass, keyboards; Budgie – drums, percussion	The Thorn (1984); Tinderbox (1986); Through the Looking Glass (1987)
Mid-1987 – December 1994	Siouxsie Sioux – vocals; Jon Klein – guitar; Steven Severin – bass, keyboards, backing vocals; Budgie – drums, percussion, harmonica, keyboards; Martin McCarrick – keyboards, strings	"Song from the Edge of the World" (1987); Peepshow (1988); Superstition (1991); "Face to Face" (1992); The Rapture (1995)
January 1995 – April 1996	Siouxsie Sioux – vocals; Knox Chandler – guitar; Steven Severin – bass, keyboards; Budgie – drums, percussion; Martin McCarrick – keyboards, strings	"New Skin" (1995)
Band inactive April 1996 – April 2002
April – August 2002	Siouxsie Sioux – vocals; Knox Chandler – guitar; Steven Severin – bass; Budgie – drums	The Seven Year Itch (2003)
