= Siouxsie and the Banshees discography =

- Studio albums: 11
- Extended plays: 1
- Live albums: 3
- Compilation albums: 4
- Singles: 30
- Video albums: 4
- Music videos: 28
- Other appearances: 2

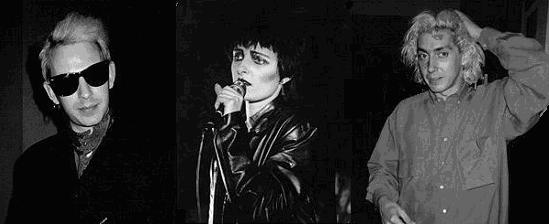

The discography of Siouxsie and the Banshees, an English rock band formed in 1976 and disbanded in 1996, consists of eleven studio albums, three live albums, four compilation albums, one extended play (EP), and thirty singles. This page lists albums, singles, and compilations by the band, alongside their chart positions, release date, and sales achievements. In the UK, the group has eight BPI-certified Silver albums and two Gold albums.

The band keeps on reissuing new editions regularly. In 2022, a 10 track compilation All Souls, including a selection of singles, album tracks and b-sides curated by Siouxsie, was released on black vinyl, and also on orange vinyl.

In 2023, The Rapture was reissued on double translucent turquoise vinyl.

In 2024, Through the Looking Glass was reissued on crystal clear vinyl with new artwork featuring a mirror effect sleeve, with a circular die cut centre section both front and back. A limited edition with an extra poster was also available.

In 2025 All Souls was released on CD in a limited edition (3000 copies) with an obi strip on 31 October.

On 20 November 2026, Downside Up, a box set collecting all the B-sides recorded by the band, was released on vinyl for the first time in a 5LP set with a 32 page booklet. 'Downside Up was reissued on a 3CD edition with a booklet. A limited edition of the vinyl box set with an extra print was also available on the band's UK and US websites.

This list does not include recordings by Siouxsie Sioux's second band, the Creatures, nor her solo work, nor Steven Severin's with the Glove, nor his in solo.

== Albums ==
=== Studio albums ===
List of studio albums, with selected chart positions and certifications
Title	Album details	Peak chart positions										Certifications
Title	Album details	UK	AUS	CAN	EUR	GER	NLD	NZ	SWE	SWI	US	Certifications
The Scream	Released: 13 November 1978; Label: Polydor; Formats: LP, 8-track, CS	12	63	—	—	—	—	—	—	—	—	BPI: Silver
Join Hands	Released: 7 September 1979; Label: Polydor; Formats: LP, CS	13	—	—	—	—	—	—	—	—	—	BPI: Silver
Kaleidoscope	Released: 8 August 1980; Label: Polydor; Formats: LP, CS	5	—	—	—	—	—	30	—	—	—	BPI: Silver
Juju	Released: 19 June 1981; Label: Polydor; Formats: LP, CS	7	—	—	—	—	—	29	—	—	—	BPI: Silver
A Kiss in the Dreamhouse	Released: 5 November 1982; Label: Polydor; Formats: LP, CS	11	—	—	—	—	—	19	47	—	—	BPI: Silver
Hyæna	Released: 8 June 1984; Label: Polydor, Geffen; Formats: LP, CS, CD	15	98	—	64	—	—	18	50	—	157	
Tinderbox	Released: 21 April 1986; Label: Polydor, Geffen; Formats: LP, CS, CD	13	97	—	50	—	51	34	32	—	88	
Through the Looking Glass	Released: 2 March 1987; Label: Polydor, Geffen; Formats: LP, CS, CD	15	—	—	28	59	62	46	23	29	188	BPI: Silver
Peepshow	Released: 6 September 1988; Label: Polydor, Geffen; Formats: LP, CS, CD	20	—	74	64	64	98	—	—	—	68	BPI: Silver
Superstition	Released: 11 June 1991; Label: Polydor, Geffen; Formats: LP, CD, CS	25	55	—	39	—	—	—	—	—	65	
The Rapture	Released: 14 February 1995; Label: Polydor, Geffen; Formats: LP, CD, CS	33	—	66	—	—	—	—	—	—	127	
"—" denotes a recording that did not chart or was not released in that territory.

=== Live albums ===
List of live albums, with selected chart positions and certifications
Title	Album details	Peak chart positions		Certifications
Title	Album details	UK	NZ	Certifications
Nocturne	Released: 25 November 1983; Label: Polydor, Geffen; Formats: 2×LP, CS	29	35	BPI: Silver
The Seven Year Itch	Released: June 2003; Label: Sanctuary; Formats: CD, 2×LP	—	—	
At the BBC	Released: 1 June 2009; Label: Universal International; Formats: 3-CD + 1-DVD box set, DL	140	—	
"—" denotes a recording that did not chart or was not released in that territory.

=== Compilation albums ===
List of compilation albums, with selected chart positions and certifications
Title	Album details	Peak chart positions		Certifications
Title	Album details	UK	NZ	Certifications
Once Upon a Time/The Singles	Released: December 1981; Label: Polydor; Formats: LP, CS	21	16	BPI: Gold
Twice Upon a Time – The Singles	Released: 5 October 1992; Label: Polydor, Geffen; Formats: CD, 2×LP, CS	26	—	
The Best of Siouxsie and the Banshees	Released: 12 November 2002; Label: Polydor/Geffen; Formats: CD	132	—	BPI: Gold
Downside Up	Released: 29 November 2004; Label: Universal; Formats: 4-CD box set, DL	—	—	
Voices on the Air: The Peel Sessions	Released: 23 October 2006; Label: Universal; Formats: CD, DL	—	—	
Spellbound: The Collection	Released: 12 January 2015; Label: Universal; Formats: CD, DL	—	—	
Classic Album Selection Volume One (6 CDs: The Scream, Join Hands, Kaleidoscope, Juju, A Kiss in the Dreamhouse, Nocturne)	Released: 29 January 2016; Label: Universal; Formats: 6-CD box set	—	—	
Classic Album Selection Volume Two (6 CDs: Hyæna, Tinderbox, Through the Looking Glass, Peepshow, Superstition, The Rapture)	Released: 22 April 2016; Label: Universal; Formats: 6-CD box set	—	—	
All Souls	Released: 21 October 2022 CD released: 31 October 2025; Label: Universal; Formats: LP, CD	—	—	
"—" denotes a recording that did not chart or was not released in that territory.

== Extended plays ==
List of extended plays, with selected chart positions
Title	EP details	Peak chart positions
Title	EP details	UK
The Thorn	Released: 19 October 1984; Label: Polydor; Formats: LP	47
The Peel Sessions	Released: 24 February 1987; Label: Strange Fruit; Formats: LP, CD, CS	97
The Peel Sessions: The Second Session	Released: 1988; Label: Strange Fruit; Formats: LP, CD, CS	—
The Peel Sessions (First & Second Sessions combined)	Released: 1989; Label: Strange Fruit; Formats: CD	—
"—" denotes a recording that did not chart or was not released in that territory.

== Singles ==
List of singles, with selected chart positions and certifications, showing year released and album name
Title	Year	Peak chart positions									Certifications	Album
Title	Year	UK	AUS	EUR	EUR Radio	IRE	NLD	NZ	US	US Dance	Certifications	Album
"Hong Kong Garden"	1978	7	38	—	—	10	—	—	—	—	BPI: Silver	Non-album singles
"The Staircase (Mystery)"	1979	24	—	—	—	—	—	—	—	—		Non-album singles
"Playground Twist"	1979	28	—	—	—	—	—	—	—	—		Join Hands
"Mittageisen"	1979	47	—	—	—	—	—	—	—	—		Non-album single
"Happy House"	1980	17	—	—	—	—	—	—	—	—		Kaleidoscope
"Christine"	1980	22	—	—	—	—	—	—	—	—		Kaleidoscope
"Israel"	1980	41	—	—	—	—	—	—	—	73		Non-album single
"Spellbound"	1981	22	—	—	—	—	—	47	—	73		Juju
"Arabian Knights"	1981	32	—	—	—	—	—	—	—	64		Juju
"Fireworks"	1982	22	—	—	—	—	—	—	—	—		Non-album single
"Slowdive"	1982	41	—	—	—	—	—	—	—	—		A Kiss in the Dreamhouse
"Melt!" / "Il Est Né Le Divin Enfant"	1982	49	—	—	—	—	—	—	—	—		A Kiss in the Dreamhouse
"Dear Prudence"	1983	3	44	—	—	10	—	—	—	—	BPI: Silver	Non-album single
"Swimming Horses"	1984	28	—	—	—	—	—	—	—	—		Hyæna
"Dazzle"	1984	33	—	—	—	—	—	—	—	—		Hyæna
"Overground"	1984	47	—	—	—	—	—	—	—	—		The Thorn
"Cities in Dust"	1985	21	—	57	—	22	37	—	—	17		Tinderbox
"Candyman"	1986	34	—	88	—	21	—	—	—	—		Tinderbox
"This Wheel's on Fire"	1987	14	—	55	—	13	—	—	—	—		Through the Looking Glass
"The Passenger"	1987	41	—	—	48	—	—	—	—	—		Through the Looking Glass
"Song from the Edge of the World"	1987	59	—	—	—	—	—	—	—	—		Non-album single
"Peek-a-Boo"	1988	16	149	54	50	18	—	—	53	14		Peepshow
"The Killing Jar"	1988	41	—	—	—	—	—	—	—	37		Peepshow
"The Last Beat of My Heart"	1988	44	—	—	—	—	—	—	—	—		Peepshow
"Kiss Them for Me"	1991	32	40	96	—	29	—	—	23	8		Superstition
"Shadowtime"	1991	57	148	—	—	—	—	—	—	—		Superstition
"Fear (of the Unknown)"	1991	—	—	—	—	—	—	—	—	6		Superstition
"Face to Face"	1992	21	184	75	—	—	—	—	—	—		Batman Returns (soundtrack)
"O Baby"	1994	34	—	—	22	—	—	—	125	—		The Rapture
"Stargazer"	1995	64	—	—	—	—	—	—	—	—		The Rapture
"—" denotes a recording that did not chart or was not released in that territory.

=== Limited fan club releases ===
Title	Year	Notes	Album
"Head Cut" / "Running Town"	1983	Both tracks recorded live in 1983 [The File fan club single only]	Non-album singles
"Dizzy" (version 1)	2002	One-track CD – sold at concerts in 2002	Non-album singles

== Other appearances: songs specifically recorded for movie soundtracks ==
Year	Title	Album
1992	"Face to Face"	Batman Returns
1995	"New Skin"	Showgirls

== Limited promotional edition with exclusive track ==
- 1992 4-Cut Sampler [including "Overground" (Live at the KROQ Acoustic Christmas Show – LA 21 December 1991)] [US Geffen Promo CD for Twice Upon a Time - The Singles]

== Videos ==
- 1981 Once Upon a Time/The Singles VHS
- 1983 Nocturne VHS (from two 1983 performances at the Royal Albert Hall)
- 1992 Twice Upon a Time – The Singles VHS

== DVDs ==
- 2003 The Seven Year Itch
- 2004 The Best of Siouxsie and the Banshees, Sound & Vision edition, (bonus DVD that includes music videos for all the featured songs on the main disc excluding "Dizzy").
- 2006 Nocturne (remastered version of the 1983 concerts, omitting "Paradise Place", "Dear Prudence", "Slowdive" and "Happy House")
- 2009 At the BBC (DVD featuring all live performances recorded by BBC Television, included in a 4 CD box set)

== Vinyl reissues ==
- 2014 "Hong Kong Garden" (double 7" also containing "Voices", "Hong Kong Garden" [2006's orchestral introduction] and "Voices" [1984's orchestral version])
- 2015 Join Hands (gatefold release with originally-intended artwork for Record Store Day)
- 2016 The Scream (picture disc with an extra print)
- 2018 Their 11 studio albums were repressed on 180 g black vinyl: Superstition and The Rapture were each pressed on double vinyl. There were also two limited editions: a gold vinyl reissue of Juju and a blue vinyl reissue of The Scream.
- 2019 A purple/black/white splatter vinyl reissue of Hyæna, was released in June.
- 2020 An edition of Once Upon A Time: The Singles on clear vinyl was released in December.
- 2021 A burgundy-coloured vinyl of Tinderbox was released in October.
- 2022 A new 10-track compilation All Souls, [including "Fireworks", "Supernatural Thing", "El Dia de los Muertos" and "Something Wicked (This Way Comes)" plus other songs such as "Spellbound"], was released on black vinyl, and also on orange vinyl.
- 2023 A clear and gold marbled vinyl reissue of A Kiss in the Dreamhouse was released for Record Store Day in April. A double turquoise vinyl of The Rapture was reissued in October.
- 2024 A double vinyl edition of Nocturne featuring new artwork and an extra poster was released for Record Store Day in April. A crystal clear vinyl of Though the Looking Glass with a new artwork featuring a mirror effect sleeve, was released in October.
- 2026 A vinyl box set of Downside Up (5 LPs) with an extra 32 page booklet will be released on 20 November.

== Other release ==
- 2014 It's a Wonderful Life [A Journey into Sound by Siouxsie Sioux and Steven Severin] (a 14-track CD compilation for Mojo magazine in November 2014; includes a selection of songs from movie soundtracks, TV soundtracks and more)

== Music videos ==
List of music videos, showing year released and directors
Title	Year	Director(s)
"Hong Kong Garden"	1978	Clive Richardson
"The Staircase (Mystery)"	1979	Clive Richardson
"Playground Twist"	1979	Clive Richardson
"Happy House"	1980	Clive Richardson
"Christine"	1980	Clive Richardson
"Red Light"	1980	Clive Richardson
"Israel"	1980	Clive Richardson
"Spellbound"	1981	Clive Richardson
"Arabian Knights"	1981	Clive Richardson
"Fireworks"	1982	Clive Richardson
"Slowdive"	1982	Clive Richardson
"Dear Prudence"	1983	Tim Pope
"Swimming Horses"	1984	Tim Pope
"Dazzle"	1984	Tim Pope
"Cities in Dust"	1985	Tim Pope
"Candyman"	1986	Clive Richardson
"This Wheel's on Fire"	1987	Clive Richardson
"The Passenger"	1987	Clive Richardson
"Song from the Edge of the World"	1987	Clive Richardson
"Peek-A-Boo"	1988	Peter Scammel
"The Killing Jar"	1988	Peter Scammel
"The Last Beat of My Heart"	1988	Peter Scammel
"Kiss Them For Me"	1991	Peter Scammel
"Shadowtime"	1991	Peter Scammel
"Fear (Of The Unknown)"	1991	Peter Scammel
"Face To Face"	1992	Neil Abramson
"O Baby"	1995	John Hillcoat
"Stargazer"	1995	John Hillcoat
