= The Peel Sessions (Siouxsie and the Banshees) =

The Siouxsie and the Banshees Peel sessions are the first two sessions recorded by English post-punk band Siouxsie and the Banshees for John Peel's radio show on BBC Radio 1 in November 1977 and February 1978. First released in 1987 and 1988, both sessions were remastered to be included on the Voices on the Air: The Peel Sessions CD compilation.

== Background ==
In early 1977, the band performed live tracks composed with guitarist Peter Fenton : their set consisted of "Psychic", "Scrapheap", "Bad Shape", "Love in a Void", "Carcass", plus a rendition of the "Captain Scarlet" TV theme and their own version of "The Lord's Prayer". In May when Fenton made the mistake of playing an impromptu solo during a concert at the Roxy in London, he was fired on the spot with singer Siouxsie Sioux having unplugged his amp. Soon a new guitarist John McKay - a friend of John Maybury and drummer Kenny Morris at London's Camberwell College of Arts, was hired for gigs from July. New songs including "Mirage", "Nicotine Stain" were composed with McKay.

In November, the band managed to convince John Peel and the BBC for the recording of their first Peel session. Peel would champion the band and very quickly suggest them to tape a second session in February 1978.

== Releases ==
=== The Peel Sessions EP (1987) ===
The Peel Sessions

EP by Siouxsie and the Banshees
- Released: 24 February 1987
- Recorded: 29 November 1977
- Genre: Punk, post-punk
- Label: Strange Fruit

Siouxsie and the Banshees chronology
The Peel Sessions (1987)	The Peel Sessions (The Second Session) (1989)

The first EP, The Peel Sessions, was released in 1987 by record label Strange Fruit. It features recordings made for John Peel's show broadcast on 5 December 1977, and was recorded at the BBC Studios in Maida Vale, London, England on 29 November 1977. None of the songs had been released prior to the broadcast.

The EP entered on the UK Singles Chart, peaking at number 95.

==== Track listing ====
Side A
No.	Title	Length
1.	"Love in a Void"	2:39
2.	"Mirage"	2:40

Side B
No.	Title	Length
1.	"Metal Postcard"	3:34
2.	"Suburban Relapse"	3:05

==== Personnel ====
Personnel taken from The Peel Sessions liner notes.

Siouxsie and the Banshees

- Siouxsie Sioux – vocals
- Steven Severin – bass guitar
- John McKay – guitar
- Kenny Morris – drums

Production

- Tony Wilson – production

=== The Peel Sessions The Second Session EP (1988) ===
The Peel Sessions (The Second Session)

EP by Siouxsie and the Banshees
- Released: 1988
- Recorded: 6 February 1978
- Genre: Post-punk
- Label: Strange Fruit

Siouxsie and the Banshees chronology
The Peel Sessions (1987)	The Peel Sessions (The Second Session) (1988)

The second EP, also titled The Peel Sessions, was released in 1988 by Strange Fruit. It features the recordings made for John Peel's show broadcast on 23 February 1978, and was recorded at the BBC Studios on 6 February 1978. None of the songs had been released prior to the broadcast. The version of "Hong Kong Garden" is the only early studio recording on which the oriental hook is played on glockenspiel. The session also includes a version of "Overground" featuring a Hammond organ motif.

==== Track listing ====
Side A
No.	Title	Length
1.	"Hong Kong Garden"	2:41
2.	"Overground"	3:10

Side B
No.	Title	Length
1.	"Carcass"	3:42
2.	"Helter Skelter"	3:30

==== Personnel ====
Personnel taken from The Peel Sessions (The Second Session) liner notes.

Siouxsie and the Banshees

- Siouxsie – lead vocals
- Steven Severin – bass guitar, vocals
- Kenny Morris – drums, vocals
- John McKay – guitar, vocals

Production

- Tony Wilson – production
