= Voices on the Air: The Peel Sessions =

Live album by Siouxsie and the Banshees
- Released: 23 October 2006
- Recorded: 1977–1986
- Genre: Punk rock Post-punk; Alternative rock
- Label: Universal
- Producer: Malcolm Brown (1-4), Tony Wilson (5-12), Dale Griffin (13-16), Mike Robinson (17-19)

Siouxsie and the Banshees live albums chronology
Seven Year Itch (2003)	Voices on the Air: The Peel Sessions (2006)	At The BBC (2009)

Professional ratings
Review scores
Source	Rating
AllMusic	4/5 stars
Stylus	A+

Voices on the Air: The Peel Sessions is a compilation released in 2006 by English alternative rock band Siouxsie and the Banshees, it was issued only on CD. It is composed of recordings made on John Peel's BBC Radio 1 show. The first three sessions date from the Banshees Mk1, the 1977-1979 era of guitarist John McKay and drummer Kenny Morris. The fourth session was captured during guitarist John McGeoch-era in 1981. The last session was done in 1986, with guitarist John Valentine Carruthers.

The artwork representing white lines on a blue monochrome, was first used on the back sleeve of the 1978 "Hong Kong Garden" single; it had been created for the band's first ever b-side "Voices".

The compilation received critical acclaim. In a review rated A, Stylus wrote: "what the Peel Sessions always seem to be about—highlighting the raw essence at the centre of any given song, harnessing it and bringing it out in ways that studio versions can’t quite manage". Reviewer Peter Parrish praised the last track of the 1981 session, saying: "Much like “Land’s End” from the concluding session, “Voodoo Dolly” provides an exceptional, smouldering broodfest, sustained over the five-minute mark and beyond." There was also "a cameo appearance from a Creatures tune [ Siouxsie and Budgie's second group], the percussion-heavy “But Not Them”." In a review rated 4 out of 5, AllMusic dubbed their first sessions, "a fiery statement of intent from what became one of the key bands of the next two decades".

The two first sessions had previously been released on two separate EPs The Peel Sessions in 1987 and 1988.

== Track listing ==
=== CD: Polydor / 984 294–0 (UK) ===
1. "Love in a Void" (2:39)
2. "Mirage" (2:40)
3. "Metal Postcard" (3:34)
4. "Suburban Relapse" (3:05)
5. "Hong Kong Garden" (2:41)
6. "Overground" (3:10)
7. "Carcass" (3:42)
8. "Helter Skelter" (3:30)
9. "Placebo Effect" (4:23)
10. "Playground Twist" (3:05)
11. "Regal Zone" (3:53)
12. "Poppy Day" (2:04)
13. "Halloween" (3:38)
14. "Voodoo Dolly" (6:30)
15. "But Not Them" (3:32)
16. "Into the Light" (4:21)
17. "Candyman" (3:46)
18. "Cannons" (3:19)
19. "Lands End" (6:18)
- tracks 1–4 recorded 29 November 1977
- tracks 5–8 recorded 6 February 1978
- tracks 9–12 recorded 9 April 1979
- tracks 13–16 recorded 10 February 1981
- tracks 17–19 recorded 28 January 1986
