= Love in a Void =

"Love In a Void"
- UK single double A-side label

Song by Siouxsie and the Banshees
- Released: September 1979
- Recorded: June 1979
- Studio: Air Studios, London
- Genre: Punk rock
- Length: 3:03
- Label: Polydor Records
- Songwriters: Siouxsie Sioux, Steven Severin, Kenny Morris, Peter Fenton
- Producers: Mike Stavrou and Nils Stevenson

"Love In a Void" is a song by the English rock band Siouxsie and the Banshees, written by singer Siouxsie Sioux, bassist Steven Severin, drummer Kenny Morris and guitarist Peter Fenton. Originally included as the B-side of the 1979 single "Mittageisen" in West Germany, it was later released as a double A-side single in September of the same year. It was also included on the band's 1981 ten track UK Gold certified compilation album Once Upon a Time/The Singles, and on the CD reissue of the album Join Hands.

The song was covered by metal band Darkthrone on the EP Too Old Too Cold in 2006. "Love in a Void" was also heavily sampled by rapper Akala in a version retitled "Love in my Eyes" on the album Freedom Lasso in 2007. The Banshees' studio version of "Love in a Void" was featured on the soundtrack of the 2016 film 20th Century Women.

Siouxsie and the Banshees' biographer Brian Johns wrote that "Love in a Void" was "their old stage favourite" back in the late 1970s.

== Composition and recording ==
Early demos indicate that the band composed the song during the first half of 1977 with guitarist Peter Fenton in the line-up. The lyric was written by Steven Severin.

When the band recorded their first John Peel session for BBC Radio 1 in late November 1977, at Maida Vale Studios with Fenton's replacement John McKay, the first song aired was "Love in a Void". Biographer Brian Johns noted that "Kenny Morris' drums were given the Glitter Band treatment on 'Love In a Void'". The Peel session recording would be later released as an EP in 1987 and then in 2006 on the compilation Voices on the Air: The Peel Sessions.

In June 1979, the band finally recorded the song in George Martin's plush AIR Studios, situated on Oxford Street in London, for Polydor. It was released as a double A-side 7-inch single in the UK in September. It was produced by band's manager Nils Stevenson and Mike Stavrou; the latter had engineered for one of the group's major influences, T. Rex, on the album Dandy in the Underworld.

The Banshees had already recorded for Polydor another song dating from the Fenton era, "Carcass", on their debut album The Scream (1978).

== Legacy ==
The band were filmed playing "Love in a Void" live in concert by director Derek Jarman; this featured in the 1978 film Jubilee. The song was credited in the end credits of the film, which was later released on VHS and DVD.

When the band decided to release a compilation album in late 1981, they included a version of "Love in a Void" in a slightly different mix. "Love in a Void" also featured in the boxset At the BBC.

The song was still popular among their audience many years after its initial release. When Rolling Stone reviewed a tour reunion concert in New York in 2002, journalist Robin Athman noted that one discontented attendee said, upon leaving the venue, "I can't believe they didn't play 'Love in a Void'." Stuart Braithwaite of Mogwai selected it among his essential punk favourites during a radioshow for ABC.

== Personnel ==
- Siouxsie Sioux – vocals
- Steven Severin – bass guitar
- Kenny Morris - drums
- John McKay – guitar

== Sources ==
- Johns, Brian (1989). Entranced: the Siouxsie and the Banshees story. Omnibus Press. ISBN 0-7119-1773-6.
- Paytress, Mark (2003). Siouxsie & the Banshees: The Authorised Biography. Sanctuary. ISBN 1-86074-375-7.
