= The Staircase (Mystery) =

Single by Siouxsie and the Banshees
- B-side: "20th Century Boy"
- Released: 23 March 1979
- Recorded: 1978
- Genre: Post-punk
- Length: 3:06
- Label: Polydor
- Songwriters: Siouxsie Sioux; John McKay; Steven Severin; Kenny Morris
- Producer: Nils Stevenson

Siouxsie and the Banshees singles chronology
"Hong Kong Garden" (1978)	"The Staircase (Mystery)" (1979)	"Playground Twist" (1979)

Music video
- "The Staircase (Mystery)" on YouTube

"The Staircase (Mystery)" is a song by English rock band Siouxsie and the Banshees, released as a stand-alone single on 23 March 1979 by Polydor Records. The track was written by Siouxsie Sioux, John McKay, Steven Severin and Kenny Morris, and was produced by Nils Stevenson.

The single's B-side is a cover of the 1973 T. Rex song "20th Century Boy".

== Release ==
"The Staircase (Mystery)" was released as the band's second single on 23 March 1979 by Polydor Records. It became the group's second top 40 entry, peaking at number 24 on the UK Singles Chart.

The track later surfaced on the singles compilation album Once Upon a Time/The Singles. When the band's debut album, The Scream, was remastered and reissued in 2005 with bonus material, "The Staircase (Mystery)" was included in the package.

== Reception ==
Melody Maker hailed the single and wrote: "The Banshees have been able to come up with a couple of slices of excellent music for their singles. 'The Staircase' hasn't anywhere near the commercial potential or immediacy of 'Hong Kong Garden', but nevertheless it's a great song. A sinister almost mesmerising tune, dominated by Siouxsie's unorthodox vocals – it grows and matures with each play."

Smash Hits said, "the 'mystery' of the song is solved if you speculate that the band were zonked out of their brains when they wrote it. This is not necessarily a criticism; just an observation. In fact both sides of the record are powerfully attractive."

== Track listing ==
All tracks produced by Nils Stevenson.

7-inch single
No.	Title	Writer(s)	Length
1.	"The Staircase (Mystery)"	Siouxsie Sioux; John McKay; Steven Severin; Kenny Morris	3:06
2.	"20th Century Boy"	Marc Bolan	1:57

== Personnel ==
Siouxsie and the Banshees

- Siouxsie Sioux – vocals
- Steven Severin – bass guitar
- John McKay – guitar
- Kenny Morris – drums

Technical

- Nils Stevenson – production

== Charts ==
Chart (1979)	Peak position
UK Singles (OCC)	24
