= Sixes and sevens =

Sixes and sevens may refer to:

- At sixes and sevens, an English phrase and idiom, common in the United Kingdom
- Sixes and Sevens, 1911 collection of short stories by O. Henry
- At Sixes and Sevens, Sirenia's debut album released in 2002
- Sixes & Sevens, a 2008 album by Adam Green
- Sixes and Sevens, a 2025 album by John McKay
- Sixes and Sevens, a solitaire card game similar to Contradance
