= Sixes and Sevens =

Studio album by John McKay
- Released: 9 May 2025
- Recorded: 1980–89
- Genre: Post-punk
- Length: 42:00
- Label: Tiny Global Productions

Singles from Sixes and Sevens
- 1. "Flare" Released: 7 February 2025; 2. "The Blessed West" Released: 21 March 2025; 3. "Vigilante" Released: 25 April 2025

Sixes and Sevens is the debut solo album by English musician John McKay, the first studio guitarist of Siouxsie and the Banshees. It was released on 9 May 2025 through Tiny Global Productions, on vinyl, CD and digital.

The songs were recorded in studio between 1980 and 1989, and then archived in McKay's vault, before being mastered in 2024. Upon release in the UK, Sixes and Sevens reached number 38 in the Albums Sales Chart and number 23 in the Vinyl Albums Chart.

== Background and recording ==
After his departure from Siouxsie and the Banshees in September 1979, John McKay was still a musician under contract with Polydor. The record company soon asked him to record some of the new songs he had composed at that time. The songs "The Blessed West", “Flare” and “Taken For Granted", were taped at the PolyGram Studios in 1980 with McKay on vocals and guitar, the first studio drummer of the Banshees Kenny Morris and bassist Mick Allen. In 1982, McKay worked with other musicians and hired drummer Graham Dowdall and bassist Matthew Seligman. In the mid-1980s, the band did a few concerts as Zor Gabor, with McKay's partner Linda Clark also on vocals.They recorded in studio regularly. A single "Tightrope" was released in 1987 on In Tape (a record label run by Marc Riley of the Fall). David Cunningham produced the songs "Sacred Measure" and "Tightrope". McKay did a last recording session in 1989. McKay kept all the original tapes in his vault and in the early 2020s, music journalist John Robb, then his second wife, Laurie, and friends, introduced him to the owner of the label, Tiny Global Productions. The recordings were mastered in 2024. The title of the album summed up how lost and confused he felt after his exit of the Banshees, he was at sixes and sevens.

== Release ==
In February 2025, McKay announced the release of eleven unheard songs for an archive release through Tiny Global Productions. The album was issued on vinyl, CD and digital on 9 May. Three singles, "Flare"; "The Blessed West" and "Vigilante" were digitally released.

== Touring 2025-2026 ==
McKay formed a band and toured under the moniker John McKay's Reactor in the UK in 2025. His band features singer Jen Brown, bassist Billy King and drummer Jola.

== Critical reception ==
Professional ratings
Review scores
Source	Rating
Classic Rock	8/10
Mojo	4/5 stars
Record Collector	4/5 stars
Uncut	7/10

Victoria Segal of Mojo gave the album four out of five stars review, stating it was a "fascinating" "trove of songs". Uncut hailed the record as "a surprising jolt" with "relentless" and "intriguing" songs. Simon Price of Record Collector praised the album, giving it four stars, saying it was an "unexpected treasure" offering an "insight into an alternate universe where the original Banshees never broke up". Chris Roberts of Classic Rock rated it 8 out of 10, saying it included "sharp songs" with a sound that is "ugly-beautiful, serrated-smooth", citing ""Zen And The Art Of Nonsense" as "a prescient pinnacle of angular guitars". Louder Than War praised it saying it was a "reminder of what’s possible when musicians treat culture as a site of struggle rather. [...] A call, perhaps, to make things harder again. To be challenging. To be ambitious." The Wire published a positive review and notably hailed "Sacred Measure" as "exceptional" where different elements "miraculously ... gel".

== Track listing ==
All tracks are written by John McKay (composer and lyricist) and Linda McKay (lyricist).

Sixes And Sevens track listing
No.	Title	Length
1.	"Zen and the Art of Nonsense"	04:33
2.	"Fun on the Floor"	02:45
3.	"The Blessed West"	03:02
4.	"Taken for Granted"	03:29
5.	"Looks Can Kill"	03:20
6.	"Sacred Measure"	05:18
7.	"Flare"	04:33
8.	"Black Five"	02:30
9.	"Vigilante"	02:17
10.	"Zor Gabor"	02:58
11.	"Tightrope"	07:17

== Personnel ==
- John McKay – vocals, guitar, saxophone

with

- Kenny Morris – drums°
- Mick Allen – bass°

°Morris and Allen played on three 1980 tracks “The Blessed West,” “Flare” and “Taken For Granted.”

- Linda Clark McKay – vocals
- Graham Dowdall – drums on the other tracks
- Matthew Seligman – bass on the other tracks

Additional musicians:

- Andy Diagram – trumpet on "Sacred Measure"
- Susie Mészáros – violin on "Tightrope"
- Ruth Phillips – cello on "Tightrope"

Production:

- David Cunningham – producer on "Sacred Measure" and "Tightrope"

== Charts ==
Chart performance for Sixes And Sevens
Chart (2025)	Peak position
Scottish Albums (Official Charts)	22
UK Independent Albums (Official Charts)	19
