= The Thorn (EP) =

EP by Siouxsie and the Banshees
- Released: 19 October 1984
- Recorded: August–September 1984
- Genre: Post-punk
- Labels: Polydor, Wonderland
- Producers: Siouxsie and the Banshees, Mike Hedges

Siouxsie and the Banshees chronology
Hyæna (1984)	The Thorn (1984)	Tinderbox (1986)

Singles from The Thorn
- 1. "Overground" Released: 2 November 1984

The Thorn is an EP recorded by British Post-punk band Siouxsie and the Banshees. It was released in October 1984 by Polydor and remastered in 2004 to be included on the Downside Up box set.

== Background, content and recording ==
The purpose of the EP was three-fold: Siouxsie stated that she wanted to induct new guitarist John Valentine Carruthers into the Banshees, to try out some string arrangements, and to simply re-record tracks that had evolved on tour. Some of the strings were played by musicians of the London Symphonic Orchestra (LSO), and a 27-piece orchestra called the "Chandos Players", a British early-music ensemble founded in 1981 and known for their performances of baroque music using period instruments.

The Thorn features four of the band's tracks recorded with orchestral instrumentation: "Overground" originally appeared on the Banshees' debut album The Scream; "Placebo Effect" was a song from their second album Join Hands, while "Voices" and "Red Over White" were previously released as B-sides from the singles "Hong Kong Garden" and "Israel", respectively. The recording took place in Bavaria, in Germany between August and September 1984.

== Release ==
The Thorn was released on 19 October 1984 by record label Polydor. The songs from the EP were later included on the fourth disc of Downside Up, a collection of the band's B-sides.

== Track listing ==
Side A
No.	Title	Length
1.	"Overground"	3:53
2.	"Voices (On the Air)"	5:26

Side B
No.	Title	Length
1.	"Placebo Effect"	4:37
2.	"Red Over White"	5:43

== Personnel ==
Siouxsie and the Banshees

- Siouxsie Sioux – vocals
- Steven Severin – bass
- Budgie – drums
- John Valentine Carruthers – guitar

Additional personnel

- The Chandos Players – orchestration
- Sam Artiss – conduction
- Gini Ball – strings on "Red Over White"
- Anne Stephenson – strings on "Red Over White"
- Martin McCarrick – string arrangements
- Bill McGee – string arrangements
- Gini Ball – string arrangements
- Anne Stephenson – string arrangements
