= Playground Twist =

Single by Siouxsie and the Banshees

from the album Join Hands
- B-side: "Pulled to Bits"
- Released: 29 June 1979
- Recorded: 1978
- Genre: Post-punk
- Length: 3:00
- Label: Polydor
- Songwriters: Susan Ballion, Kenny Morris, John McKay and Steven Severin
- Producers: Nils Stevenson, Mike Stavrou

Siouxsie and the Banshees singles chronology
"The Staircase (Mystery)" (1979)	"Playground Twist" (1979)	"Mittageisen" (1979)

Music video
- "Playground Twist" on YouTube

"Playground Twist" is a song by English post-punk band Siouxsie and the Banshees. It was released in 1979 as the sole single from the band's second album, Join Hands (1979).

== Production ==
The track was produced by the band's manager Nils Stevenson and Mike Stavrou, a recording engineer on T. Rex's final album, Dandy in the Underworld (1977)

== Critical reception ==
NME's Roy Carr hailed the single and wrote: "If Ingmar Bergman produced records, they might sound like this. The listener is immediately engulfed in a maelstrom of whirling sound punctuated by the ominous tolling of church bells, phased guitars, thundering percussion, a surreal alto sax and the wail of Siouxsie's voice. It demands to be played repeatedly at the threshold-of-pain volume to elicit its full nightmarish quality".

== Music video ==
The music video for "Playground Twist" shows the band performing on an indoor climbing frame with several children running from one end to another, climbing on the surrounding equipment, and even a few of them mimicking the saxophone solo with plastic toy instruments. At the end of the video, the children run toward Siouxsie and playfully pull her to the floor as she lip syncs the final word "drown", and the final shot shows them laughing and carrying on with her.

== Release and legacy ==
Released on 24 June 1979, the single became Siouxsie and the Banshees' third top 40 hit, entering into the UK Singles Chart at No.47 on 1 July 1979, and peaking at No. 28 on 15 July in the UK Singles Chart. The band performed the song live on Top of the Pops.

A live-version of the B-side, "Pulled to Bits", was included on the 1983 Nocturne live album and DVD. "Pulled to Bits" was covered by the Mars Volta in 2007 for their single "Wax Simulacra".
