= The Woman in the Dunes (album) =

Studio album by Steven Severin
- Released: August 8, 2000
- Genre: Rock
- Label: Phantom Records (RE PCD02 CO)

Steven Severin chronology
Maldoror (1999)	The Woman in the Dunes (2000)	UnisexDreamSalon (2001)

The Woman in the Dunes is a 2000 concept album by Steven Severin, formerly of Siouxsie and the Banshees. The album provides an alternative soundscape inspired by Hiroshi Teshigahara's 1964 film version of Japanese existentialist writer Kōbō Abe's novel The Woman in the Dunes. The original soundtrack to the Teshigahara film was provided by Japanese composer Toru Takemitsu.

== Track listing ==
All tracks composed by Steven Severin; except where indicated

1. "The Dawning" – 7:26
2. "Dance Sisyphus" – 8:50
3. "Dance of Fear" – 7:33
4. "Dance of Eros" – 12:49
5. "I Put a Spell in You" – (Screamin' Jay Hawkins) Steven Severin featuring Jarboe and Nick Pagan 3:24
6. "Dance of Ecstasy" – 8:21
