= Overground (song) =

1978 song by Siouxsie and the Banshees

Song by Siouxsie and the Banshees

from the album The Scream
- Released: 13 November 1978
- Recorded: August 1978
- Genre: Post-punk
- Label: Polydor
- Songwriter(s): Steven Severin; John McKay
- Producer(s): Siouxsie and the Banshees; Steve Lillywhite

"Overground"

Single by Siouxsie and the Banshees

from the album The Thorn
- B-side: "Placebo Effect"
- Released: 2 November 1984
- Recorded: 1984
- Genre: Post-punk, art rock
- Label: Polydor
- Songwriter(s): Steven Severin; John McKay
- Producer(s): Siouxsie and the Banshees; Mike Hedges

Siouxsie and the Banshees singles chronology
"Dazzle" (1984)	"Overground" (1984)	"Cities in Dust" (1985)

"Overground" is a song by English rock band Siouxsie and the Banshees. It was originally featured on their debut studio album, The Scream (1978). The band re-recorded the track with elaborate, lush orchestral instrumentation with a flamenco acoustic guitar for its inclusion on the four-track extended play The Thorn (1984). This version was released as a single the same year by record label Polydor.

== Music ==
This version taken from The Thorn EP was co-produced with Mike Hedges. "Just how far they've come is shown by the '84 reworking of 'Overground'", observed Dave Morrison in a review of Twice Upon a Time – The Singles, "where the teeth-grating abrasion of old gives way to a panoramic sound of martial drumming, strings and flamenco guitars".

The Thorn version of "Overground" was later included on the 2004 box set Downside Up.

== Release ==
The Thorn version of "Overground" was released as a single on 2 November 1984 by Polydor, with "Placebo Effect", a track first appearing on Join Hands album, as its B-side. It peaked at number 47 on the UK Singles Chart.
