= Mittageisen =

1979 single by Siouxsie and the Banshees

"Metal Postcard (Mittageissen)"

Song by Siouxsie and the Banshees

from the album The Scream
- Released: 13 November 1978
- Recorded: August 1978
- Studio: RAK, London
- Genre: Post-punk
- Length: 4:14
- Label: Polydor
- Songwriters: Siouxsie Sioux; John McKay
- Producers: Steve Lillywhite; Siouxsie and the Banshees

"Mittageisen"

Single by Siouxsie and the Banshees
- B-side: "Love in a Void"
- Released: 21 September 1979
- Recorded: June 1979
- Genre: Post-punk
- Length: 3:00
- Label: Polydor
- Songwriters: Siouxsie Sioux; John McKay; Kenny Morris; Steven Severin
- Producers: Nils Stevenson; Mike Stavrou

Siouxsie and the Banshees singles chronology
"Playground Twist" (1979)	"Mittageisen" (1979)	"Happy House" (1980)

"Mittageisen" is a song by English rock band Siouxsie and the Banshees. It originally appeared on the band's 1978 debut album The Scream as "Metal Postcard (Mittageissen)"; the track was re-recorded in 1979, this time with the lyrics sung in German, and released as a single in West Germany with "Love in a Void" on the b-side. That September "Mittageisen" was given a UK release by record label Polydor as a double A-side single.

== Content and sleeve ==
The title "Mittageisen" is a word play based on the German words "Mittagessen" (literally: "noon meal", i.e. lunch) and Eisen ("iron"). The title was inspired by antinazi German artist John Heartfield's photocollage Hurrah, die Butter ist Alle! ("Hurray, the Butter is Finished!"), which was also used as the single's cover art.

Heartfield's photocollage was initially used on the front page of the German magazine Arbeiter-Illustrierte-Zeitung (Workers Illustrated Journal), published on 19 December 1935. The artist was an early member of Club Dada, which started in 1916 as Cabaret Voltaire in Zürich. The picture with the title "Hurrah, die Butter ist Alle! / Hurray, the butter is finished!" shows a family who eats various pieces of metal. The trigger for it was the following quote from Hermann Göring: "Iron always made a nation strong, butter and lard only made the people fat".

== Writing and recording ==
"Mittageisen" was composed by Siouxsie Sioux and John McKay; the lyrics were translated into German by their manager Dave Woods and a woman named Renate. The single was dedicated to John Heartfield.

The double A-side, "Love in a Void", was penned by Severin and the music was mainly composed by previous Banshees guitarist Peter Fenton. The track was an early live favourite; it was also the first song of their first John Peel session, recorded in late November 1977. "Love in a Void" had not been recorded for Polydor until this release.

== Release ==
"Mittageisen" was released as a single in the UK by Polydor in September 1979. The record was promoted as a double A-side release at the time, but only "Mittageisen" charted on the UK Singles Chart, where it peaked at number 47. Nevertheless, "Love in a Void"—but not "Mittageisen"—was included on the band's 1981 singles compilation Once Upon a Time/The Singles, which compiled all their A-sides up to that time, and later on the 2006 remastered edition of Join Hands. Putative A-side "Mittageisen" later appeared on the band's B-side compilation Downside Up.

== Legacy ==
The Swiss band Mittageisen was named after this song.

The music of "Mittageisen" was heavily sampled by Massive Attack for "Superpredators (Metal Postcard)" in 1997 for the soundtrack to the film The Jackal. and on "Metal Banshee" a dub version of "Superpredators" included in the 2018 reissue of Mezzanine. Robert Smith of the Cure said: "I loved all their early singles, especially 'Metal Postcard'."

== Track listing ==
All tracks produced by Nils Stevenson and Mike Stavrou.

7-inch single
No.	Title	Writer(s)	Length
1.	"Mittageisen (Metal Postcard)"	Siouxsie Sioux; John McKay; Kenny Morris; Steven Severin	4:05
2.	"Love in a Void"	Sioux; Morris; Severin; Peter Fenton	2:30

== Personnel ==
Siouxsie and the Banshees

- Siouxsie Sioux
- John McKay
- Kenny Morris
- Steven Severin

Technical

- Nils Stevenson – production
- Mike Stavrou – production

== Charts ==
Chart (1979)	Peak position
UK Singles (OCC)	47
