= The Scream (album) =

Studio album by Siouxsie and the Banshees
- Released: 13 November 1978
- Recorded: August 1978
- Studios: RAK, London
- Genre: Post-punk
- Length: 39:04
- Label: Polydor
- Producers: Steve Lillywhite; Siouxsie and the Banshees

Siouxsie and the Banshees chronology
The Scream (1978)	Join Hands (1979)

The Scream is the debut studio album by British rock band Siouxsie and the Banshees, released on November 13, 1978, by Polydor Records. Prior to recording of the album, the band recorded two sessions for BBC radio, during which they had premiered the tracks "Metal Postcard" and "Overground". After taping their debut single, "Hong Kong Garden", the band returned to the studio with the same co-producer, Steve Lillywhite. The Scream was recorded in one week and mixed in three weeks at RAK.

The record was hailed as a landmark by reviewers and it is considered a pioneering work of post-punk. The music combines an angular and jagged guitar, a bass-led rhythm, with machine-like drums heavy on tom-toms. The sound has been described as claustrophobic, big with a lot of space. In the UK, The Scream reached number twelve on the Albums chart.

Besides post-punk, it profoundly impacted noise rock and alternative rock genres and rock guitar playing in general. Bands and musicians including Joy Division, U2, Killing Joke, Steve Albini of Big Black and the Jesus and Mary Chain have cited it as an influence.

== Background ==
In late 1977, Siouxsie and the Banshees received major press coverage but failed to secure a recording deal. In October 1977, Sounds reported that someone had sprayed the walls of 15 record companies with the words "Sign the Banshees: Do it now". The following year (1978) in June, the band signed with Polydor.

John McKay had become the band's guitarist in July 1977; music historian Clinton Heylin argued that the recruitment of McKay (along with the first steps of Magazine in late 1977 and the formation of PiL in mid-1978), marked the "true starting-point for English post-punk". Several songs off The Scream had already been recorded and broadcast on BBC Radio 1 for two John Peel sessions: "Mirage", "Metal Postcard" and "Suburban Relapse" premiered in November 1977, and "Overground" and "Carcass" were aired three months later in February 1978. When recording their first Peel session, Siouxsie Sioux and bassist Steven Severin had described their music as "cold, machine-like and passionate at the same time". Music journalist Vivien Goldman wrote: "Siouxsie and the Banshees sound like a 21st century industrial plant". Their first Peel session became one of the most requested in the show’s history.

== Recording, music and lyrics ==
The Scream was recorded in one week during August 1978, and mixed in three weeks with Steve Lillywhite co-producing. The group was in the studio while their debut single "Hong Kong Garden" was released. Lillywhite was recruited because he recorded the drums in a different way. He asked drummer Kenny Morris to play the bass drum and the snare drum first. Then he did the cymbals and the tom-toms later. Morris used cymbals sparingly: in the early days of the group, he didn't incorporate any in his playing. On "Metal Postcard", there is a "motorik austerity" in the rhythm patterns. Music journalist Kris Needs noted that Lillywhite used "deep echo" on drums. Joy Division's drummer Stephen Morris wrote in his autobiography that the Banshees used "the bass-led rhythm" and their drummer "Kenny Morris played mostly toms". Percussion was an important component of the music: future Banshees drummer Budgie remarked that Morris did "a lot of percussion overdubs" and "they are really part of the songs".

Music historian Simon Goddard described the music on The Scream as a "claustrophobic abyss of angst and angularity", saying it was part of a triptych of albums layering the foundations of post-punk. The opening cut, "Pure", had a spacious, atmospheric sound. Journalist Miranda Sawyer noted that Siouxsie's "vocals came from a distance", that "there was a lot of space" and that "the sound was big and slow". Music journalist Ian Birch wrote that "Pure" was an atmosphere piece; "a snarling, predatory bass stalks its ground before it's met by teeth-grinding guitar splinters, and the distant footfall of drums. Siouxsie's voice becomes an instrument." Siouxsie's way of singing was singular: musician Boz Boorer observed that "the whooping vocal wasn't just singing a tune, it would slide around." Kris Needs remarked that at the end of "Pure", it seeps out into "Jigsaw Feeling", a "song of disorientation and bewilderment" with a "huge, sometimes awe-inspiring sound". Another song, "Switch", was divided in three sections, one per character; "for the different people who swap jobs with terrible results - scientists, general practitioner and vicar". The music was "monochrome and minimal".

The "original... idea" was "a pure musical democracy" . The group didn't want any lead instrument, neither the voice nor the guitar "which usually dominated" the music. Every member of the band "occupied their own space, melodically and rhythmically". Severin didn't see "the bass as a supporting instrument": he always thought of it "as a driving instrument". Siouxsie wanted the Banshees' music to be "cinematic"; Bernard Herrmann's score to Alfred Hitchcock's Psycho inspired the music of "Suburban Relapse", where the guitars echo the knife-screeching violins of the famous shower scene. The group didn't want a guitar to sound like a guitar. They wanted "their music to be exciting, with a sense of fear, of uneasiness to it". The soundtrack of The Omen also inspired them.

McKay co-wrote most of the songs. Only "Carcass" dated from the band's time with Peter Fenton, their guitarist from January to May 1977.

J. G. Ballard and William S. Burroughs provided the reference points for the lyrics of The Scream. In a track such as "Suburban Relapse", the band wrote about suburbia, where they were born and raised. Severin emphasized: "That's why J.G. Ballard resonated so much with us, because all his near-future tales were set in this bizarre suburban wasteland. Suburbia is a place where you can imagine any kind of possibility, because there's space, not urban clutter".

== Title and sleeve ==
The title of the album was in part inspired by the 1968 film The Swimmer (starring Burt Lancaster), in which main character, Neddy Merrill, intended to swim home, using open-air pools. Climbing over garden fences, from pool to pool, his journey put him into a state of mental and physical exhaustion, and in the end, Goddard said, "all Neddy Merrill could think to do was scream, [...] as a scream of exhausted jubilance after a troubled, arduous journey".

The idea for the cover was Siouxsie's. Photographer Paul Wakefield met with her and the band to discuss the project. Wakefield later said:

The idea was to shoot disquieting and unnerving images underwater in a swimming pool – you can't scream underwater. I wanted to be able to completely control the lighting, and so an indoor pool was the only option. I scouted quite a few pools, but when I saw this pool in the YMCA in Central London, which was dark blue tiled with light blue lane stripes instead of the normal reverse colours, I knew it was the ideal location. I wanted to give it an eerie underwater night-time feel, and this setting was perfect. We used a number of 1000K and 2000K lights around the pool edge. I used schoolkids as models and they pretty well ran riot.

== Release ==
More than one month prior to its release, DJ John Peel broadcast the album on BBC radio 1 from an advance copy on a cassette, from the beginning to end, with no interruptions. When he finished playing it, he said, "that's the one boys and girls, that's the one."

The Scream was released on 13 November 1978. It was an almost instant commercial success, peaking at No. 12 on the UK Albums Chart. No singles were released to promote the album.

The Scream was reissued on CD in the UK on 27 October 2005 as part of Universal's Deluxe Edition series. The new edition featured a remastered version of the album on the first disc, while the second disc contained demo and live tracks together with the singles from that period. A single-disc edition of the album was also released with the two non-album singles "Kong Kong Garden" and "The Staircase (Mystery)" as bonus tracks.

A 180g black vinyl LP reissue of the original edition, mastered from the original ¼ inch tapes and cut half-speed at Abbey Road Studios by Miles Showell, was released in September 2018.

== Critical reception ==
Professional ratings
Review scores
Source	Rating
AllMusic	4/5 stars
Christgau's Record Guide	B+
Mojo (2005 deluxe edition)	4/5 stars
Q (2005 deluxe edition)	4/5 stars
Record Mirror	5/5 stars
Sounds	5/5 stars
Uncut (2005 deluxe edition)	5/5 stars

The Scream was named "the best debut album of the year" by Sounds. Reviewer Peter Silverton gave the album 5 stars out of 5, and the paper listed it at number 2 in its end-of-year best album list. Record Mirror also published a 5-star review, saying: The Scream "points to the future, real music for the new age. ... It is vital, it's moving. It's a ... landmark." Chris Westwood praised the cohesion between the words and the music: "The album's lyrical frame of mind is perfectly reflected in the work of [guitarist] McKay. [Bassist] Severin and [drummer] Morris; constantly shifting, restless, controlled aggression, they are as essential as Siouxsie." Melody Maker described the sound as "strong, abrasive, visceral and constantly inventive, with a thrust that makes the spaces equal partners to the notes", with the critic comparing the album's textures to that of Wire and Pere Ubu. ZigZag qualified it as a "magnificent record", with reviewer Kris Needs writing: "I can't think of another group who could have made an LP so uncompromising, powerful and disturbing, yet so captivating and enjoyable ... It is certainly a special classic to join milestones like [David Bowie's] Diamond Dogs, Roxy [Music]'s first and [Lou Reed's] Berlin. This is music of such strength and vision that you just can't not be moved by the time they swing into the final climactic passage of 'Switch', the closing track." Needs qualified the sound as "huge, sometimes awe-inspiring" and commented that Morris created "one of the best drum sounds I've ever heard – the deep echo and floor-shuddering mix accentuating his muted Glitter Band stomp". Critic Adam Sweeting began his review by saying, "This is a chilling, intense masterpiece". Sweeting noted that the musicians "have perfected a group sound which is powerful but streamlined", adding that "the words and music combine to produce coolly dazzling images".

Several journalists from NME also praised the record. Nick Kent first stated that the band sounded "like some unique hybrid of the Velvet Underground mated with much of the ingenuity of Tago Mago-era Can." He then focused his attention on the opening track, saying: "Pure" "takes the sound to its ultimate juncture, leaving spaces that say as much as the notes being played. Certainly, the traditional three-piece sound has never been used in a more unorthodox fashion with such stunning results." In December 1978, another critic from NME, Paul Morley, described the music on The Scream as "unlike anything in rock":

It is not, as some would say, chaotic – it is controlled. Each instrument operates within its own space, its own time, as if mocking the lines of other instruments. Known rock is inverted, leaving just traces of mimicry of rock's cliches – satire that often bursts with glorious justification into shaking celebration (as on "Helter Skelter"). It is easy to gain attention by doing something which is crudely obviously out of the ordinary, but the Banshees have avoided such futile superficialities: it is innovation, not revolution, not a destruction but new building. It has grown out of rock – Velvets, Station to Station, Bolan. And Siouxsie's staggering voice is dropped, clipped, snapped prominently above this audacious musical drama, emphasizing the dark colours and empty, naked moods.

However, in her review of the album, NME's Julie Burchill was unimpressed, stating that the Banshees sound was "a self-important threshing machine thrashing all stringed instruments down onto the same low level alongside that draggy sub-voice as it attempts futile eagle and dove swoops around the mono-beat. Their sound is certainly different from the normal guitar-bass-drums-voice consequence. But it's radically stodgy ... loud, heavy and levelling, the sound of suet pudding".

Kurt Loder gave a very favourable review in Rolling Stone, remarking that The Scream was a "striking debut album"; and that its "sound, stark though fully realized (thanks partly to a most simpatico co-producer, Steve Lillywhite), is lent added intellectual dimension by a series of disturbingly ambiguous lyrical images". The 2004 edition of The Rolling Stone Album Guide gave a 4 out 5 rating, with the comment: "Even if you can't figure out exactly what makes Siouxsie wail the way she does, The Scream creates a rich, claustrophobic maelstrom of crude sound and half-submerged feelings."

During a BBC radio show, David Bowie mentioned a concert of the group given after the release of their first album: "I saw you Siouxsie and you were really excellent ... I was clutching my copy of The Scream".

== Legacy ==
Record Mirror's Ronnie Gurr wrote "The Scream, a masterpiece that, for six months, I failed to recognise as such, was a harrowing listening experience." Since its release, The Scream has received a number of accolades from the music press. NME rated it at No. 58 in their "Writers All Time 100 Albums" list in 1985. Don Watson of the NME in 1986 described the album's music as "something that whipped the past into a great whirlpool of noise, pulling the future down". Uncut magazine placed it at No. 43 in their list of the 100 greatest debut albums. It was featured in the books 1001 Albums You Must Hear Before You Die, and Colin Larkin's All Time Top 1000 Albums. In 2006, music critic Garry Mulholland included it in his book Fear of Music about the 261 greatest albums since punk and disco. He praised Morris's "tribal rhythms and McKay"s abstract guitar". In 2007, Record Collector wrote that "it stands as one of the great debut albums from any era". In 2016, Les Inrockuptibles rated it as one of "The 100 Best British Albums" in a special issue. In 2017, Q included it in their list of "the debut albums that changed music" with "revolutionnary sounds".

The Scream placed the group among the pioneers of post-punk, as Robert Smith of the Cure contended:

When The Scream came out, I remember it was much slower than everybody thought. It was like the forerunner of the Joy Division sound. It was just big-sounding.

The Scream has been influential on a large number of genres and artists. Joy Division's Peter Hook, who saw the group in concert in Manchester in 1977, said about The Scream: "Siouxsie and the Banshees were one of our big influences ... The Banshees first LP was one of my favourite ever records, the way the guitarist and the drummer played was a really unusual way of playing." Joy Division's drummer Stephen Morris said: "[their] first drummer Kenny Morris played mostly toms" and "the sound of cymbals was forbidden", "the Banshees had that ... foreboding sound, sketching out the future from the dark of the past". Bono of U2 said: The Scream was "otherworldly", "it resonated with us". Geordie Walker of Killing Joke praised McKay's guitar playing and sound: "on The Scream, ... he came out with these chord structures that I found very refreshing. The guy's been ripped off so much, he started that flanged chord thing". The Cure's frontman said that he "loved" the band's early material, "especially "Metal Postcard", and "Overground".

Pat Smear of Germs said: "it is so weird and great... all the guitar playing on that first Banshees album really inspired me". Steve Albini of Big Black praised guitarist John McKay for the noise he created, stating that "The Scream is notable for a few things: only now people are trying to copy it, and even now nobody understands how that guitar player (you know, the one who's been replaced by everyone in England) got all that pointless noise to stick together as songs", and further adding, "good noise guitar is like an orgasm." Elsewhere, Albini recounted that he "admired and emulated ... Wire, Siouxsie and the Banshees, This Heat." Thurston Moore of Sonic Youth said that all of the records he owned in the mid-1970s "got kind of put into the basement. And they were supplanted by" the debut albums of bands like "Talking Heads and Siouxsie and the Banshees. It was a completely new world, a new identity of music that was an option for youth culture". Moore, who also included "Hong Kong Garden" in his 38 favorite songs of all time, stated about this album and the group: "Siouxsie and the Banshees, did they release a better record than The Scream?" While playing his favourite records on BBC Radio 6, Jim Reid of the Jesus and Mary Chain commented: "'Jigsaw Feeling' from The Scream album ... it was brilliant, amazing. That's a reason why I made music". When he included The Scream in a list he did for The Quietus of the 13 records that "chiselled out The Jesus And Mary Chain", Jim Reid praised McKay's playing saying, "The guitar just sounded incredible. It was like, how is he doing that?". The Jesus and Mary Chain's co-founder also remarked that "in 1978... there were a couple of bands that led the way, and the Banshees were one of those. This record... moves on, whereas hardly anybody else did." Morrissey said that The Scream was Siouxsie and the Banshees' best album, he selected "Mirage" to be played during intermission before all the concerts of his Kill Uncle and Your Arsenal tours. Morrissey's main composer, Boz Boorer, rated The Scream highly, ranking it second in his "Top Five Desert Island Album Selection", right after Electric Warrior by T. Rex. Boorer stated: "Another big influence on my playing is John McKay ... That first Siouxsie record was quite incredible sounding, and it started me in thinking that music didn't have to be any certain way—that there could be many different influences in music and it didn't have to be a single, strict avenue. That first Banshees album has a lot of jarring guitar that rubs against what you'd think was going to or maybe should happen over a part, and that changed my thinking quite a bit".

Massive Attack covered and sampled "Metal Postcard (Mittageisen)" on their song "Superpredators (Metal Postcard)" in 1997 for the soundtrack to the movie The Jackal: they also released "Metal Banshee", which was a different version sampling "Metal Postcard". Faith No More covered "Switch" in concert and cited this first Siouxsie and the Banshees' album as one of their influences.

Bobby Gillespie of Primal Scream said that he was inspired by their debut album: "They had a sound unlike any other band" and the songs were "a realisation that life is difficult, not normal pop song material. The Scream was the first record through which I experienced these themes, where the band's music mirrored the lyrics perfectly", with "a film noir atmosphere". He praised guitarist McKay for delivering "quicksilver notes of beautiful sonic violence". Gillespie also wrote: the band "were a new kind of rock", and McKay "reinvented rock guitar playing". Garbage lead singer Shirley Manson cited it as one of her all-time favourite records. Brett Anderson of Suede included The Scream on a list of albums titled "current fascinations". Marc Almond of Soft Cell also explained why the songs mattered to him: "The Scream made a real impression on me. I loved the way they turned these suburban things into nightmares—that was a great influence on early Soft Cell stuff". Tracey Thorn of Everything but the Girl remembered 1978 as an important music year. "Back then when I only had five or six records I'd listen to each of them over and over, knowing every beat, every word, every scratch. Elvis Costello's My Aim is True, The Scream by Siouxsie and the Banshees, The Jam's In the City, Moving Targets by Penetration, and Another Music in a Different Kitchen by Buzzcocks". Journalist David Cavanagh wrote in 2016: "The Scream - released on Polydor after Peel had repeatedly cajoled record labels to sign the band - was to influence the sound of early U2, the Cure, the Cocteau Twins and My Bloody Valentine. Each one of these bands has influenced at least four hundred others".

== Track listing ==
Side A
No.	Title	Lyrics	Music	Length
1.	"Pure"		Siouxsie Sioux, Steven Severin, John McKay, Kenny Morris	1:50
2.	"Jigsaw Feeling"	Severin	McKay, Severin	4:39
3.	"Overground"	Severin	McKay	3:50
4.	"Carcass"	Siouxsie, Severin	Siouxsie, Peter Fenton	3:49
5.	"Helter Skelter"	John Lennon, Paul McCartney	Lennon, McCartney	3:46

Side B
No.	Title	Lyrics	Music	Length
6.	"Mirage"	Severin	McKay	2:50
7.	"Metal Postcard (Mittageissen)"	Siouxsie	McKay	4:14
8.	"Nicotine Stain"	Siouxsie	Severin	2:58
9.	"Suburban Relapse"	Siouxsie	McKay	4:12
10.	"Switch"	Siouxsie	McKay	6:52

2006 CD remastered reissue bonus tracks
No.	Title	Lyrics	Music	Length
11.	"Hong Kong Garden" (7" A-side)	Siouxsie	Siouxsie, Severin, McKay, Morris	2:55
12.	"The Staircase (Mystery)" (7" A-side)	Siouxsie	Siouxsie, Severin, McKay, Morris	3:15

2005 CD remastered Deluxe Edition bonus disc
No.	Title	Lyrics	Music	Length
1.	"Make Up to Break Up" (Riverside session)	Siouxsie	Siouxsie, Severin, Fenton, Morris
2.	"Love in a Void" (John Peel Session 1)	Severin	Siouxsie, Severin, Fenton, Morris
3.	"Mirage" (John Peel Session 1)
4.	"Metal Postcard (Mittageisen)" (John Peel Session 1)
5.	"Suburban Relapse" (John Peel Session 1)
6.	"Hong Kong Garden" (John Peel Session 2)
7.	"Overground" (John Peel Session 2)
8.	"Carcass" (John Peel Session 2)
9.	"Helter Skelter" (John Peel Session 2)
10.	"Metal Postcard" (Pathway demo)
11.	"Suburban Relapse" (Pathway demo)
12.	"The Staircase (Mystery)" (Pathway demo)
13.	"Mirage" (Pathway demo)
14.	"Nicotine Stain" (Pathway demo)
15.	"Hong Kong Garden" (7" Single Version)
16.	"The Staircase (Mystery)" (7" Single Version)

Deluxe Edition bonus disc

- track 1 recorded in 1977
- tracks 2–5 recorded on 29 November 1977
- tracks 6–9 recorded in 6 February 1978
- tracks 10-14 recorded in June 1978

== Personnel ==
Siouxsie and the Banshees

- Siouxsie Sioux – vocals
- John McKay – guitar, saxophone, xylophone on "Hong Kong Garden"
- Steven Severin – bass guitar, synthesizer, keyboards, guitar
- Kenny Morris – drums, percussion

Technical

- Steve Lillywhite – production, mixing
- Siouxsie and the Banshees – production, design concept
- Paul Wakefield – photography

== Charts ==
Chart performance for The Scream
Chart (1978–1980)	Peak position
Australian Albums (Kent Music Report)	63
UK Albums (Official Charts)	12

== Certifications ==
Certifications for The Scream
Region	Certification	Certified units/sales
United Kingdom (BPI)	Silver	60,000^{^}
^{^} Shipments figures based on certification alone.
