= At the BBC (Siouxsie and the Banshees album) =

Box set by Siouxsie and the Banshees
- Released: 1 June 2009
- Recorded: November 1977 – May 1991
- Genre: Post-punk; alternative rock
- Label: Universal International

Siouxsie and the Banshees chronology
Voices on the Air: The Peel Sessions (2006)	At the BBC (2009)	All Souls (2022)

At the BBC is a live box set containing three CDs and a DVD by alternative rock band Siouxsie and the Banshees, released in June 2009 by record label Universal International.

The physical version is sold out; the boxset is hence only available on audio streaming and media services such as Amazon Prime Music, iTunes, Spotify and Deezer.

== Content ==
At the BBC consists of four discs containing 84 digitally remastered tracks of BBC sessions, live concert tracks and TV performances recorded between 1977 and 1991 split across three CDs and a DVD, as well has a hard-back book.

The DVD featured several live sessions filmed for The Old Grey Whistle Test and Oxford Road Show, and for the first time, a previously unreleased concert filmed in Warwick in March 1981, prior to their Juju album, with John McGeoch on guitar. Robert Smith was also featured on guitar on nine songs, including a TV session in 1979 and all the TV appearances from November 1982 through March 1984.

== Reception ==
Professional ratings
Review scores
Source	Rating
The List	4/5 stars
Mojo	4/5 stars
Record Collector	4/5 stars

Mojo wrote:

In a four-disc box 3 CDs cover their BBC sessions but it's the one vital DVD that reveals the Banshees' true nature. Make no mistake: post-punk started here. And that’s not the half of it. Between late 1977 and autumn '79, no British band could touch the Banshees. Their infamous, improvised August '76 debut at the 100 Club Punk Rock Festival had taken DIY to its literal extreme. A year later, they re-emerged with a John Peel session that was light years from numbskull punk. That debut, still shockingly artful and assured, heads off 55 songs recorded for BBC Radio which make up the first three discs here. A fourth parcels up 29 performances shot for BBC TV. From an ice cool arrival on Old Grey Whistle Test, to a saffron-flavoured farewell on Top of the Pops 13 years later, it chronicles the transformation of punk’s most militant iconoclasts into an alternative music colossus.

== Track listing ==
Disc one

1. "Love in a Void" (John Peel 29 November 1977)
2. "Mirage" (John Peel 29 November 1977)
3. "Metal Postcard" (John Peel 29 November 1977)
4. "Suburban Relapse" (John Peel 29 November 1977)
5. "Hong Kong Garden" (John Peel 6 February 78)
6. "Overground" (John Peel 6 February 78)
7. "Carcass" (John Peel 6 February 78)
8. "Helter Skelter" (John Peel 6 February 78)
9. "Placebo Effect" (John Peel 9 April 79)
10. "Playground Twist" (John Peel 9 April 79)
11. "Regal Zone" (John Peel 9 April 79)
12. "Poppy Day" (John Peel 9 April 79)
13. "Halloween" (John Peel 10 February 81)
14. "Voodoo Dolly" (John Peel 10 February 81)
15. "But Not Them" (John Peel 10 February 81)
16. "Into The Light" (John Peel 10 February 81)
17. "Arabian Knights" (Richard Skinner Show – Recorded 4 June 81. Transmitted 16 June 81)
18. "Red Over White" (Richard Skinner Show – Recorded 4 June 81. Transmitted 16 June 81)
19. "Headcut" (Richard Skinner Show – Recorded 4 June 81. Transmitted 16 June 81)
20. "Supernatural Thing" (Richard Skinner Show – Recorded 4 June 81. Transmitted 16 June 81)

Disc two

1. "Coal Mind" (Kid Jensen Show Recorded 13 May 82. Transmitted 24 May 82.)
2. "Green Fingers" (Kid Jensen Show – Recorded 13 May 82. Transmitted 24 May 82.)
3. "Painted Bird" (Kid Jensen Show – Recorded 13 May 82. Transmitted 24 May 82.)
4. "Cascade" (Kid Jensen Show – Recorded 13 May 82. Transmitted 24 May 82.)
5. "Candyman" (John Peel 10 February 86)
6. "Cannons" (John Peel 10 February 86)
7. "Lands End" (John Peel 10 February 86)
8. "Shooting Sun" (Janice Long Show – Recorded 11 January 87. Transmitted 2 February 87.)
9. "Song from the Edge of the World" (Janice Long Show – Recorded 11 January 87. Transmitted 2 February 87.)
10. "Little Johnny Jewel" (Janice Long Show – Recorded 11 January 87. Transmitted 2 February 87.)
11. "Something Blue" (Janice Long Show – Recorded 11 January 87. Transmitted 2 February 87.)
12. "Green Fingers" (Apollo Theatre, Oxford in Concert – Recorded 14 November 85. Transmitted 10 March 86.)
13. "Bring Me the Head of the Preacher Man" (Apollo Theatre, Oxford in Concert – Recorded 14 November 85. Transmitted 10 March 86.)
14. "Sweetest Chill" (Apollo Theatre, Oxford in Concert – Recorded 14 November 85. Transmitted 10 March 86.)
15. "Cannons" (Apollo Theatre, Oxford in Concert – Recorded 14 November 85. Transmitted 10 March 86.)
16. "Melt!" (Apollo Theatre, Oxford in Concert – Recorded 14 November 85. Transmitted 10 March 86.)
17. "Candyman" (Apollo Theatre, Oxford in Concert – Recorded 14 November 85. Transmitted 10 March 86.)
18. "Lands End" (Apollo Theatre, Oxford in Concert – Recorded 14 November 85. Transmitted 10 March 86.)

Disc three

1. "Night Shift" (Apollo Theatre, Oxford in Concert – Recorded 14 November 85. Transmitted 10 March 86.)
2. "92 Degrees" (Apollo Theatre, Oxford in Concert – Recorded 14 November 85. Transmitted 10 March 86.)
3. "Pulled to Bits" (Apollo Theatre, Oxford in Concert – Recorded 14 November 85. Transmitted 10 March 86.)
4. "Switch" (Apollo Theatre, Oxford in Concert – Recorded 14 November 85. Transmitted 10 March 86.)
5. "Happy House" (Apollo Theatre, Oxford in Concert – Recorded 14 November 85. Transmitted 10 March 86.)
6. "Cities in Dust" (Apollo Theatre, Oxford in Concert – Recorded 14 November 85. Transmitted 10 March 86.)
7. "The Last Beat of My Heart" (Royal Albert Hall, London – Recorded 21 September 88. Transmitted 14 October 88.)
8. "The Killing Jar" (Royal Albert Hall, London – Recorded 21 September 88. Transmitted 14 October 88.)
9. "Christine" (Royal Albert Hall, London – Recorded 21 September 88. Transmitted 14 October 88.)
10. "This Wheel's on Fire" (Royal Albert Hall, London – Recorded 21 September 88. Transmitted 14 October 88.)
11. "Something Blue" (Royal Albert Hall, London – Recorded 21 September 88. Transmitted 14 October 88.)
12. "Rawhead and Bloody Bones" (Royal Albert Hall, London – Recorded 21 September 88. Transmitted 14 October 88.)
13. "Carousel" (Royal Albert Hall, London – Recorded 21 September 88. Transmitted 14 October 88.)
14. "Rhapsody" (Royal Albert Hall, London – Recorded 21 September 88. Transmitted 14 October 88.)
15. "Skin" (Royal Albert Hall, London – Recorded 21 September 88. Transmitted 14 October 88.)
16. "Spellbound" (Royal Albert Hall, London – Recorded 21 September 88. Transmitted 14 October 88.)
17. "Hong Kong Garden" (Royal Albert Hall, London – Recorded 21 September 88. Transmitted 14 October 88.)

DVD

1. "Metal Postcard" (The Old Grey Whistle Test: 7 November 1978 Stereo)
2. "Jigsaw Feeling" (The Old Grey Whistle Test: 7 November 1978 Stereo)
3. "Playground Twist" (Top of the Pops: 12 July 1979 Stereo)
4. "Love in a Void" (Something Else 3 November 1979 Stereo)
5. "Regal Zone" (Something Else 3 November 1979 Stereo)
6. "Happy House" (Top of the Pops Date: 10 April 1980 Stereo)
7. "Israel" (Something Else: 15 December 1980 Stereo)
8. "Tenant" (Something Else: 15 December 1980 Stereo)
9. "Israel" (Rock Goes to College: 9 March 1981 Stereo)
10. "Spellbound" (Rock Goes to College: 9 March 1981 Stereo)
11. "Arabian Knights" (Rock Goes to College: 9 March 1981 Stereo)
12. "Halloween" (Rock Goes to College: 9 March 1981 Stereo)
13. "Night Shift" (Rock Goes to College: 9 March 1981 Stereo)
14. "But Not Them" (Rock Goes to College: 9 March 1981 Stereo)
15. "Voodoo Dolly" (Rock Goes to College: 9 March 1981 Stereo)
16. "Eve White/Eve Black" (Rock Goes to College: 9 March 1981 Stereo)
17. "Spellbound" (Top of the Pops 4 June 1981 Stereo)
18. "Fireworks" (Top of the Pops Date: 3 June 1982 Stereo)
19. "Melt!" (The Old Grey Whistle Test 12 November 1982)
20. "Painted Bird" (The Old Grey Whistle Test 12 November 1982)
21. "Melt!" (Oxford Road Show 3 December 1982 Stereo)
22. "Overground" (Oxford Road Show 3 December 1982 Stereo)
23. "Dear Prudence" (Top of the Pops 29 September 1983 Stereo)
24. "Dear Prudence" (Top of the pops 29 December 1983 Stereo)
25. "Swimming Horses" (Top of the Pops 29 March 1984 Stereo)
26. "Cities in Dust" (Whistle Test Date: 29 October 1985 Stereo)
27. "Lands End" (Whistle Test Date: 29 October 1985 Stereo)
28. "This Wheel's on Fire" (Top of the Pops 22 January 1987 Stereo)
29. "Peek-a-Boo" (Top of the Pops 28 July 1988 Stereo)
30. "Kiss Them for Me" (Top of the Pops 30 May 1991 Stereo)
