= Join Hands =

1979 studio album by Siouxsie and the Banshees

Studio album by Siouxsie and the Banshees
- Released: 7 September 1979
- Recorded: May–June 1979
- Studios: AIR, London
- Genre: Post-punk
- Length: 42:29
- Label: Polydor
- Producers: Nils Stevenson; Mike Stavrou

Siouxsie and the Banshees chronology
The Scream (1978)	Join Hands (1979)	Kaleidoscope (1980)

Originally-intended cover
- The vinyl reissue of the album in 2015 featured the originally-intended, John Maybury-designed sleeve with an edited image from a Holy Communion card.

Singles from Join Hands
- 1. "Playground Twist" Released: 24 June 1979

Join Hands is the second studio album by the English rock band Siouxsie and the Banshees, released on 7 September 1979 by Polydor Records.

Join Hands took the topic of the First World War as its lyrical inspiration. Musically, it is darker than the band's debut album The Scream: it sounds more claustrophobic and more haunting. It was the last album with the band's first recorded line-up, as guitarist John McKay and drummer Kenny Morris quit the group after a disagreement at the beginning of the British Join Hands tour, on the day of the album's release.

Upon its release, it was praised by the British press, including Melody Maker, Sounds, NME and Record Mirror. The record peaked at No. 13 on the UK Albums Chart. "Playground Twist" was the only single released from the album. Join Hands was reissued on vinyl in 2015, along with the very first artwork that the band had presented to Polydor in 1979.

== History, content and music ==
Join Hands was written over a period of six months. In 1979, the band watched news reports from Iran, including scenes of repression and curfews; it was one of the first times they had seen images of people being shot and killed on television. In England, the political situation was also unstable, with rubbish piling up in the streets of London. Siouxsie Sioux saw it as "a real time, everything in flux and uncertain but also festering underneath, and because this stuff from the past that was just left there rotting there and it needed to be acknowledged and then cleaned up, not just swept away still rotting". The band were inspired by these events. The theme of war emerged through the songs: rather than a pro-military message, the lyrics were meant to capture the spirit of what things were like at the time. Miranda Sawyer stated that Join Hands took "the very un-rock'n'roll topic of World War I as its inspiration".

The album's references to poppies represented the idea of "loss, of flesh and blood and hopelessness". The themes of the songs also included "child-like terror, attacks on social and spiritual conditioning] various kinds of death and torture, and loneliness". Some songs were also about families and nursing. For the critic Ronnie Gurr, "All lyrical options are left completely open".

The album opens with the sound of tolling bells before the beginning of "Poppy Day". The words were based on John McCrae's poem "In Flanders Fields", which was written in 1915 after the loss of a friend during a First World War battle. "Poppy Day", a short track with a long introduction building over what one journalist called "shards of John McKay's guitar" and a "strident militaristic backbeat", had been shaped after Steven Severin had observed the televised two minutes of silence in memory of the war dead on Sunday, 12 November 1978. "We wanted to write a song that would fittingly fill that gap", he stated. On the inner sleeve of the album, the mention "2 minutes of silence" was added next to the lyrics of the song.

"Regal Zone", featuring saxophone by McKay, also covers the subject of war and is about the conflict in Iran. "Placebo Effect" addresses the use of placebos in medicine, while "Icon" displays echoes of iconoclasm, with the destruction of paintings featuring religious images, or statues and symbols of old authoritarian regimes. "Premature Burial", "ostensibly inspired" by Edgar Allan Poe's short story of the same name, is the track from which the album title had been taken. It is, in Siouxsie's words, "an expression of claustrophobia, of being hemmed in both by society's and people's limitations". For the writer Mark Paytress, the line "We're all sisters and brothers" looked like a mockery of the Summer of Love. The song's conclusion features what sounds like "a formal choir backing for a retreating Red Army in its magnificent defeat".

Beginning the second side, "Playground Twist" is a "swirling mass of flanged guitars" with church bells; it includes a nursery rhyme section. The song "talks about adults who act like children and children who think they're adults". Siouxsie explained: "It's about the cruelty of children and that whole aspect of being thrown out into the playground in the winter in howling gales and left to fend for yourself. It's not the sort of thing you're supposed to write pop songs about". It was the band's third single in less than a year and "probably the best", according to the music historian Clinton Heylin. The single did not sound catchy, but it nevertheless entered the top 30. Severin later recalled the head of A&R at Polydor telling him he expected a commercial failure.

The lullaby "Mother / Oh Mein Papa" is an interpretation of the German song "O mein Papa" with words by Siouxsie. Phil Sutcliffe called it "a raw wound of a song offered by Siouxsie from her own life and surely shared and picked and scratched at by everyone who hears it". Over a music box, two voices sing simultaneous love and hatred for the same mother. The positive lyric is upfront and the negative one is in the background. The final track of the album is a studio recording of "The Lord's Prayer", the song that Siouxsie and the Banshees had famously played at their debut live performance at the 100 Club Punk Festival in September 1976. It was recorded in one take; after every session in the first week, they put down a version of "The Lord's Prayer". Before entering the studio, the band had recorded a John Peel session in early April in which they had premiered the tracks "Placebo Effect", "Playground Twist", "Regal Zone" and "Poppy Day". The band then went into AIR Studios on Oxford Street in London to record the album in May. By June, they had mixed it.

Join Hands was different from The Scream; it was darker, more experimental, less abrasive, with a new "claustrophobic" mood. McKay's guitar-playing generates a "barrage of sound" while Severin's "bass carries the tune". The recording took place under a strained atmosphere. McKay and Kenny Morris withdrew and became uncommunicative with the rest of the band and their manager and co-producer of the album, Nils Stevenson. Unlike the sessions for The Scream, the music was recorded without Siouxsie, as she added her vocals later. Morris did not take part in the mixing sessions, while Siouxsie was heavily involved. Commenting a few days before the album's release, Jon Savage wrote about the music: "The songs are delivered with the stifling intensity of inner violence in a locked room". Kris Needs remarked that Join Hands was, in retrospect, an ironic title for a record which split the group in two. The album reflected how the band felt at the time: "We were lonely and isolated and that comes across in the music", stated Siouxsie in 2003. She added: "Musically, Join Hands was an uncompromising album but it still sounds modern today".

== Cover artwork, release and tour ==
Initially, the group wanted to release an album cover using an edited image from a Holy Communion card, showing children joining hands. The image had been photocopied several times, so it had become distorted. The art direction was by John Maybury, a college friend of Morris. Their manager, Stevenson, was unable to determine who owned the copyright and advised that the band would be bankrupted if they were sued as a result. Polydor also became nervous about copyright infringement, so the artwork was pulled at the last minute; the record company's executives also disliked its religious nature. A UK tour had already been scheduled to coincide with the release of the album, so there was no possibility of delaying the release.

Stevenson suggested an alternative cover. He instructed the Polydor art department to design artwork using four statues from the Guards Memorial, from a photo session the band had recently done in front of the monument which commemorates the war dead of the First World War. Four of the soldier statues were cut out from the shot of the band. Siouxsie found the sleeve a workable solution, as she was drawn in by the imagery conjured up by the words for "In Flanders Fields", which inspired "Poppy Day". For her, it was the linchpin for the album. The poppy reproduced on the album cover is a symbol of Remembrance Sunday in the UK. The designer, Rob O'Connor, said about the layout: "The wreath of poppies was devised to help add colour and create a graphic device". An embossed sleeve was planned, with the four soldiers inked in the card, but was not used because the band did not receive the proofs in time. Morris and McKay blamed Stevenson, Siouxsie and Severin, although it was Polydor that refused the extra expense at the last minute. Nevertheless, Severin succeeded in pushing for a gatefold cover: "We wanted it all white because you were supposed to do it all black, and you were supposed to have blackmail lettering on it and so we had it nice and classic", he stated. Maybury's drawings of the band were used on the inner spread; it was the only part of the original design that survived.

Join Hands was issued on 7 September 1979 by Polydor Records. It reached No. 13 in the UK Albums Chart. At that time, the breach between McKay and Morris and the rest of the group had become important. A warm-up show in Ireland had caused problems for McKay; none of the ancillary equipment arrived at the venue, forcing him to play without all his effects pedals. Finally, after a brawl at a record shop, McKay and Morris abruptly left the band on the day of the album's release, just a few hours before a concert at the Capitol Theatre in Aberdeen. It was a spur-of-the-moment decision, but they never returned. Severin later remarked, "Is there another band that that's happened to? I don't think so".

A 2006 remastered edition included two bonus tracks: the non-album song "Love in a Void" and the previously unreleased instrumental "Infantry". The album, this time with the Maybury-designed sleeve, was reissued on vinyl for Record Store Day in April 2015. This edition had the original collection of tracks, but "Infantry" was made the album's closing track, as had been the original intent.

A 180g vinyl reissue of the album, remastered from the original ¼” tapes and cut half-speed at Abbey Road Studios by Miles Showell, was released in August 2018.

== Critical reception ==
Professional ratings
Review scores
Source	Rating
AllMusic	2/5 stars
NME	8/10
(The New) Rolling Stone Album Guide	2.5/5 stars
Sounds	4.5/5 stars
Spin Alternative Record Guide	4/10

Upon release, the album was well received by reviewers. Sounds reviewer Peter Silverton noted a change in the sound: "The mix is different to the last album. Now there's a clarity which frames Sue's voice like it was a thing of treasure". Silverton also wrote that some of the songs have "Siouxsie's voice double-tracked with devastating effect". Jon Savage, a Melody Maker reviewer, described the first track, "Poppy Day", as a "short, powerful evocation of the Great War graveyards in Flanders". He also wrote that "Placebo Effect" "has a stunning flanged guitar intro, chasing clinical lyrics covering some insertion or operation". About "Icon", Savage wrote: "The brilliantly reverbed guitar is a perfect foil for Siouxsie's soaring and, for once, emotional vocal." Savage noted that the five songs of the first side "rise and fall into another in a stunning segue". Similarly, Paul Morley wrote in NME that "Side one's five songs ... are all addictive Banshees mini-dramas". Ronnie Gurr, a Record Mirror reviewer, also hailed the record, saying: "Poppy Day establishes the band's perfect employ of atmospherics and sets the tone of all the tracks". "Mother" was compared to the soundtrack of an Alfred Hitchcock film, with Gurr noting that the "track features a musical box, echoes menacing guitar grumblings and Siouxsie providing vocals that would befit any of Hitchcock's best matricides". Gurr concluded that with "Severin's truly disturbing scratchings", Join Hands was a dangerous work that "should be heard". The Huddersfield Daily Examiner called Join Hands "a superb album of strength and poetry," and praised "that weird and wonderfully controlled voice of Siouxsie".

In a retrospective review published in 1989, Steve Lamacq wrote in NME that Join Hands was "a more absorbing, haunting LP" than the band's debut album but that the version of "The Lord's Prayer" was "out of place". The 2004 edition of The Rolling Stone Album Guide commented that the "brooding trance music" of their previous material "can slip into dankness" on Join Hands. AllMusic's David Cleary considered "Icon" the best track on the album, commenting that it "survives an unpromising beginning to open out into a faster main section with fuller vocal sound and gutsier guitar work", but Cleary panned the rest of Join Hands, describing it as "almost uniformly grim, with dragging tempos, bleak lyrics, long and wandering free-form structures, static and often unfocused harmony and thick, colorless arrangements". The Spin Alternative Record Guide noted the "more austere, droning and, frankly, dreary direction".

Music journalist David Quantick said: "One of my favourite albums is Siouxsie & The Banshees’ Join Hands, the last album they made before half the band walked out and Sioux and Severin were forced to reinvent themselves as a pop group. I like to imagine how things would have gone if McKay and Morris had stayed".

== Legacy ==
Join Hands is considered a post-punk album by Heylin and listed as such on AllMusic. According to Simon Reynolds, it is also seen as a precursor of the gothic rock genre due to several of its songs. Its "funereal" atmosphere "inspired a host of gothic impersonators", according to Mojo, but "none of whom matched the Banshees' run of singles".

AllMusic's David Cleary commented that "some of [Join Hands'] selections appear to strongly anticipate the work of Joy Division's second album, Closer, especially 'Placebo Effect', whose guitar sound was a clear inspiration for that of the Manchester band's song 'Colony'." In the 2007 film Control, the sleeve of Join Hands is shown in a scene where Ian Curtis's wife, Deborah, looks through her husband's record collection.

Join Hands was later namechecked by other critically acclaimed musicians. James Murphy, the leader of LCD Soundsystem, expressed an appreciation of the album stating the first records he bought were Join Hands, the Fall's Grotesque and the Birthday Party's "Nick the Stripper". "All three of those records are three of my favourite things I've ever heard", he said. In late 2008, Morrissey chose the track "Mother" in his playlist when he was interviewed for BBC Radio 2, and another former member of the Smiths, Johnny Marr, said he was a big admirer of second albums from several bands, including Siouxsie and the Banshees. Tim Burgess of the Charlatans stated: "'Playground Twist' is a manic masterpiece – incredible, the kind of atmosphere rarely generated on a record". Colin Newman of Wire was "mightily impressed" when he saw the band perform "The Lord's Prayer" at the 100 Club.

== Track listing ==
All lyrics are written by Siouxsie Sioux, except as noted; all music is composed by Siouxsie and the Banshees (Siouxsie, Steven Severin, John McKay, Kenny Morris), except as noted.

Side A
No.	Title	Lyrics	Length
1.	"Poppy Day"	John McCrae	2:04
2.	"Regal Zone"	Severin	3:47
3.	"Placebo Effect"		4:40
4.	"Icon"	Severin	5:27
5.	"Premature Burial"		5:58

Side B
No.	Title	Lyrics	Music	Length
1.	"Playground Twist"			3:01
2.	"Mother/Oh Mein Papa"	Siouxsie, Geoffrey Parsons, ("Oh Mein Papa") John Turner ("Oh Mein Papa")	Siouxsie and the Banshees, Paul Burkhard ("Oh Mein Papa")	3:22
3.	"The Lord's Prayer"	Traditional, Siouxsie		14:09

2006 CD remastered reissue bonus tracks
No.	Title	Lyrics	Music	Length
9.	"Love in a Void" (7" double A-side)	Severin	Siouxsie, Severin, Peter Fenton, Morris	2:35
10.	"Infantry" (previously unreleased track)			3:15

== Personnel ==
Siouxsie and the Banshees

- Siouxsie Sioux – vocals, piano
- John McKay – guitar, saxophone
- Steven Severin – bass guitar, backing vocals on 'Premature Burial'
- Kenny Morris – drums, percussion

Technical

- Mike Stavrou – production, engineering
- Nils Stevenson – production
- Ian Morais – engineering assistance
- Rob O'Connor – sleeve design
- Adrian Boot – sleeve photography
- John Maybury – sleeve illustration

== Charts ==
Chart performance for Join Hands
Chart (1979)	Peak position
UK Albums (Official Charts)	13

== Certifications ==
Certifications for Join Hands
Region	Certification	Certified units/sales
United Kingdom (BPI)	Silver	60,000^{^}
^{^} Shipments figures based on certification alone.

== Sources ==
- Johns, Brian (1989). Entranced: The Siouxsie and the Banshees Story. Omnibus Press. ISBN 0-7119-1773-6.
- Heylin, Clinton (2006). Babylon's Burning: From Punk to Grunge. Penguin Books. ISBN 0-14-102431-3.
- Paytress, Mark (2003). Siouxsie & the Banshees: The Authorised Biography. Sanctuary. ISBN 1-86074-375-7.
