= John McKay (guitarist) =

British guitarist

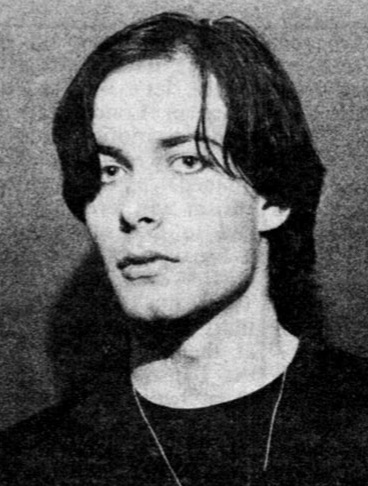
- McKay in 1979

Background information
- Born: 6 June 1958 (age 68)
- Origin: United Kingdom
- Genre: Post-punk
- Occupation: Musician
- Instruments: Guitar, saxophone
- Labels: Polydor; In-Tape; Tiny Global Productions
- Formerly of: Siouxsie and the Banshees; Zor Gabor
- Website: John McKay Official Website

John McKay (born 6 June 1958) is an English musician, songwriter and singer. He was the guitarist of Siouxsie and the Banshees, playing with the group from July 1977 until September 1979. He played a "jagged unorthodox chording", and created a "metal-shard roar" with his guitar. Q magazine included McKay's work on "Hong Kong Garden" in its list of the "100 Greatest Guitar Tracks Ever". He recorded two studio albums with the band, their debut album The Scream in 1978 and Join Hands in 1979.

McKay has been cited as an influence by guitarists such as Geordie Walker (of Killing Joke), Robert Smith (of the Cure), The Edge (of U2), Steve Albini (of Big Black), Thurston Moore (of Sonic Youth), Jim Reid (of the Jesus and Mary Chain) and Kevin Shields (of My Bloody Valentine). He has been qualified as the "innovator" by producer Steve Lillywhite.

After staying away from the music business for 35 years, he returned to the stage in the mid-2020s and released a solo album Sixes and Sevens (2025), a collection of unreleased material recorded in the 1980s.

== Life and career ==
=== Early years: Siouxsie and the Banshees ===
McKay grew up in Hemel Hempstead, a suburban town located 24 miles (39 km) north-west of London. On 2 July 1977, he joined the band Siouxsie and the Banshees, replacing guitarist Peter Fenton. McKay played his first concert with the band on 9 July at London's Vortex club. His first studio recording with the band was a session for John Peel on BBC radio in November 1977. McKay composed the tune of their first hit single, 1978's "Hong Kong Garden", as well as much of the material found on the band's first two albums, 1978's The Scream and 1979's Join Hands. He is a self-taught musician. Music historian Nick Kent wrote that McKay had "a bent for more adventurous guitar styles involving minor/diminished seventh chord work". Journalist Scott Calhoun wrote that "McKay made use of harmonics as means of artistic expression as well as way of creating textures related to new approaches in the use of the electric guitar". On certain tracks on The Scream such as "Jigsaw Feeling", he had a bell-like sound quality. He used two-note chords on several songs of Join Hands. McKay also played saxophone on the songs "Suburban Relapse", "Switch", "Regal Zone", "Playground Twist" and "Pulled to Bits". He left the band at the beginning of the Join Hands tour, a few hours before a concert in Aberdeen at the Capitol on 7 September 1979. He and drummer Kenny Morris chose to flee the town after having a dispute with Siouxsie Sioux and manager Nils Stevenson during a signing session at the Other Record Shop on Union Street. The band's co-founder Steven Severin stated at that time of the split that "As far as coming up with the tunes, it was John certainly. But when it came to matching the lyrics with the music then it was down to us. All arrangements were always a group effort." Kent wrote that Mckay "although a latecomer, immediately established himself as a vital ingredient in the shaping of the band's music. His guitar playing formed a dominant textural dimension to the Spartan overall sound, while his riffs and chord progressions provided the vital form around which the other three Banshees functioned."

=== Post-Banshees: Zor Gabor ===
McKay later led the band Zor Gabor which featured his partner Linda Clark on vocals: they started rehearsing in 1982. Graham Dowdall, who worked at the time with Nico, then joined them on drums and percussion. They recorded three songs, "Tightrope", "Amber" and "Vigilante" at studio Terminal 24 in November 1986, with Susie Mészáros on violin and Ruth Phillips on cello. "Tightrope" was released as a single in July 1987, on both 7-inch and 12-inch vinyl on the In Tape label. Melody Maker described it as a "string-driven thing that swoops and darts with perfect precision [...] investing that characteristic McKay guitar screech". "Tightrope" was reviewed "single of the week" in Sounds with this concluding line: "The important thing is, 'Tightrope' sounds pretty unique, very Zor Gabor."

McKay then worked in fashion, in Camden.

=== Solo: Sixes and Sevens (2025-present) ===
In February 2025, after a hiatus of more than three decades, McKay announced the release of Sixes and Sevens, his first solo album, on vinyl, CD and digital. Upon release in May, it received critical acclaim. Sixes and Sevens features eleven songs that McKay recorded after leaving the Banshees between 1980 and 1989. Kenny Morris and bassist Matthew Seligman of the Soft Boys, took part to the first recording session for three tracks. After the release of the album, he embarked on a UK tour with his band John McKay's Reactor featuring singer Jen Brown, bassist Billy King and drummer Jola.

== Style ==
He eschewed "conventional riffing and soloing in favour of solid, sheet-metal textures". Sounds described his "unmistakable guitar sound" as "tense, jagged, menacing".

== Guitars and effects ==
McKay used different audio effects, including fuzz (to create distortion) and flanger. Fellow guitarist John Valentine Carruthers said that McKay "had no conventional skill in guitar playing, like chords or lines. He must have had hands like a gorilla because he was playing chords like this (stretches hand right out). I've no idea what they were, and you couldn't tell by listening because they were going through fuzz and flangers." His guitars were a Hagström Semi Acoustic and a Gibson Les Paul. Mckay's effects included an MXR Flanger and the reverb from his Fender Twin Reverb amplifier.

== Legacy ==
He has been named as an influence by several post-punk, noise rock and alternative rock guitarists.

Geordie Walker of Killing Joke said: "The guy's been ripped off so much, he started that flanged chord thing". Walker praised McKay for his style on The Scream: "he came out with these chord structures that I found very refreshing". When asked "how did playing with the Banshees impact your guitar style" after the 1979's Join Hands tour, Robert Smith of the Cure stated: "It allowed me to experiment. I inherited an approach from John [McKay] which was just to have everything full up, really", using "phased/flanged distortion". Smith aspired to be like the Banshees: "the great thing about the Banshees was that they had this great wall of noise, which I'd never heard before."

In an article published in Matter magazine in 1984, Steve Albini of Big Black wrote an "all-time non-comprehensive good guitar list", and included McKay in the section titled "Noise" saying : "The Scream is notable for a couple of things: only now people are trying to copy it, and even now nobody understands how that guitar player got all that pointless noise to stick together as songs". Thurston Moore of Sonic Youth cited "Hong Kong Garden" as one of his 25 all-time favourite songs. Jim Reid of the Jesus and Mary Chain praised The Scream - era, saying: McKay "was a great guitar player, he was just so inspired." Kevin Shields of My Bloody Valentine cited the Banshees-MkI as one of his early influences, and he "saw the Banshees in Ireland in 1979", at one of McKay's last concerts with the group.

McKay is also revered by other musicians such as Johnny Marr of the Smiths and Boz Boorer (Morrissey's guitarist and composer). When asked "who do you regret not going to see live", Marr replied "Siouxsie and the Banshees mk 1". Marr cites McKay as one of the guitar players he admires. He considered Mckay as somebody "progressive". Boorer named him as a "big influence on my playing...That first Siouxsie record was quite incredible sounding, and it started me in thinking that music didn't have to be any certain way—that there could be many different influences in music and it didn't have to be a single, strict avenue. That first Banshees album has a lot of jarring guitar that rubs against what you'd think was going to or maybe should happen over a part".

In a live review published in 1979, music historian and archivist Jon Savage likened Joy Division's guitarist Bernard Sumner to McKay, saying that Sumner "was using a lot of distortion and noise in quite a melodic way. The only other person I could think of who was doing that then was John McKay from Siouxsie and the Banshees". Joy Division's bassist Peter Hook said about the Banshees' debut album: "the way the guitarist...played was a really unusual way of playing". The Edge cited Siouxsie and the Banshees Mk1 of 1977–1978 among the bands who inspired him for U2's early albums. Producer Steve Lillywhite who recorded The Scream and U2's debut album explained to journalist John Robb: "in terms of the guitar playing...John McKay came before all these people". "He was the innovator". He added: "You listen to the beginning of "Jigsaw Feeling" and it's like the beginning of 'I Will Follow'...almost identical". John McGeoch said that hearing "Hong Kong Garden" was one of "the most momentous moments in my life". Bobby Gillespie of Primal Scream described McKay's sound as "quicksilver notes of beautiful sonic violence", adding that he "reinvented rock guitar playing". Roddy Frame of Aztec Camera, paid homage to McKay in the lyrics of his song "Worlds In Worlds". When journalist Simon Reynolds interviewed Lydia Lunch saying there was this starkness of sound on certain Teenage Jesus and the Jerks songs that reminded him Siouxsie and the Banshees' circa The Scream, she replied "I loved the guitar work on their records". Pat Smear of Germs also known as guitarist with Nirvana stated that "all the guitar playing" of McKay "really inspired me".

John Frusciante considered that what the original Banshees line-up did, was a big step: "you see certain chord shapes that John McKay was doing which hadn't been done" before. When analyzing the band's career, Frusciante noted that McKay "definitely created the framework".

== Personal life ==
He married Linda Clark in 1989. She died in 2020 after being ill for many years. He married Laurie Vanian in January 2025.

== Discography ==
=== Solo ===
==== Album ====
- Sixes and Sevens (2025)

==== EP ====
- Additions (2025) (5 track CD, including "People Phobia")
