= Kenny Morris (drummer) =

British drummer (1957–2026)

- Morris in 1978

Background information
- Born: Kenneth Ian Morris; 1 February 1957
- Died: 15 January 2026 (aged 68) Cork, Ireland
- Genres: Post-punk (music); Experimental (film)
- Occupations: Musician; painter; visual artist; drawer; filmmaker
- Instruments: Drums; percussion
- Label: Polydor
- Formerly of: Siouxsie and the Banshees
- Website: Official website

Kenneth Ian Morris (1 February 1957 – 15 January 2026) was an English musician and painter. He was the first studio drummer of the band Siouxsie and the Banshees. Noted for playing mostly tom-toms and hardly using hi-hat, he is regarded as an influential drummer coming from the post-punk avant-garde.

He joined the band in February 1977. His first studio recording was in November 1977 when the group taped their first John Peel session for BBC radio. A self-taught musician, he played on the Banshees' debut album, The Scream (1978), and Join Hands (1979). He left the band at the beginning of the Join Hands tour, in September 1979.

He has been cited as an influence by drummers such as Stephen Morris of Joy Division and Kevin Haskins of Bauhaus. His machine-like drumming on "Metal Postcard" (1978) was sampled by Massive Attack in 1997.

== Life and career ==
=== Early years ===
Kenny Morris was born of Irish parents, on 1 February 1957. He grew up in Waltham Abbey, Essex: he was a child of the suburbs. He attended St Ignatius' College in Enfield, where he became a friend of future collaborator and film director John Maybury. Morris then attended Barnet College in London. He also studied fine art and film-making at North East London Polytechnic.

He attended the first live appearance of Siouxsie and the Banshees at the 100 Club in September 1976 and was impressed by their performance. At the time, he was enrolled at Camberwell School of Arts and Crafts, He briefly joined the band the Flowers of Romance with Sid Vicious, but after a few rehearsals, they split up before playing any concerts or making any recordings.

=== Siouxsie and the Banshees (1977–1979) ===
A self-taught musician, he joined Siouxsie and the Banshees, in February 1977. Morris's first studio recording was in November 1977 with the band's first John Peel session for BBC radio, which is retrospectively considered as one of the starting-points for English post-punk. Music journalist Kris Needs said: "Like as a rhythm machine for feet and guts Kenny Morris' drumming is unorthodox, primitive (in a tribal sense) and far removed from the clicking hi-hats of the fly-strength paradiddle merchants".

During the recording of the band's debut single, "Hong Kong Garden", producer Steve Lillywhite suggested he record the drums separately. Morris did the bass drum and snare drum first, adding the cymbals and tom-toms later. Lillywhite also added echo on the drums, adding significant space to the entire recording. Morris did a lot of percussion overdubs on the band's debut album, The Scream (1978), and Join Hands (1979). Record Mirror's Chris Westwood described him as an "enthusiastic experimentalist".

On 9 September 1979, he abruptly left the band with guitarist John McKay at the beginning of the Join Hands tour, a few hours before a concert scheduled in Aberdeen. "We disagreed over so many things and each time we were outnumbered by three to two". At the end there was almost no more communication with Siouxsie Sioux, bassist Steven Severin and their manager Nils Stevenson.

=== Solo recording, visual arts, writing (1980–2026) ===
After leaving the Banshees, Morris worked as a drummer with Helen Terry and other musicians for live stage sets. He also composed and produced "La Main Morte", which was released as a 12-inch solo single on Genesis P-Orridge's Temple Records in 1987. "La Main Morte" was a film soundtrack collaboration with Maybury, and featured spoken word vocals by Dorothée Lalanne and keyboards by Jean-Pierre Baudry. Morris also directed five short films.

In 1993, Morris moved from London to Ireland and, with a BA Honours degree in Fine Art, held several teaching posts. He ran an art gallery in Kildare Town in the late 1990s. He later resided in Cork, Ireland, where he practised and taught art. He sold his paintings online and via exhibitions in galleries.

In 2021, he revealed in an interview that he had written his memoir. He intended to release the book in 2026. In March 2024, there was an exhibition of his artworks in Dublin, titled "A Banshee Left Wailing". He had also decided to title his book with these same words.

== Style ==
Morris played mostly tom-toms, and hardly used cymbals and hi-hats. His drumming was described as "machine-like", sounding like a "rhythm machine", with "deep" echo. His drumming was also tribal.

== Legacy ==
NME wrote that Lillywhite's work with Morris "revolutionis[ed] the post-punk band's sound with an innovative approach to laying down the drums".

Morris has been cited as an influence by several drummers of the post-punk era. Stephen Morris of Joy Division praised him, saying: "Kenny Morris played mostly toms" on the Peel sessions with a "foreboding sound, sketching out the future from the dark of the past". Kevin Haskins of Bauhaus cited him as a primary influence, praising the way "he would use the tom tom drums rather than hi hats and cymbals".

Morris's drumming on "Metal Postcard (Mittageisen)" was extensively sampled by Massive Attack on "Superpredators" in 1997.

Post-punk music historian Jon Savage dubbed him "drummer extraordinaire".

== Death ==
Morris died, on 15 January 2026 in Cork after a short illness.
