= Siouxsie and the Banshees =

British rock band

- The band in 1979, left to right: Kenny Morris, Siouxsie Sioux, John McKay and Steven Severin

Background information
- Also known as: Janet and the Icebergs
- Origin: London, England
- Genres: Post-punk; alternative rock; gothic rock; new wave; alternative pop
- Works: Discography
- Years active: 1976–1996, 2002
- Labels: Polydor; Geffen; Sanctuary; Universal
- Spinoffs: The Creatures; The Glove
- Past members: Siouxsie Sioux; Steven Severin; Marco Pirroni; Sid Vicious; Kenny Morris; Peter Fenton; John McKay; Budgie; Robert Smith; John McGeoch; John Valentine Carruthers; Martin McCarrick; Jon Klein; Knox Chandler
- Website: siouxsieandthebanshees.co.uk

Siouxsie and the Banshees (/ˈsuzi ænd ðə ˈbænʃiz/ SU-zi-and-the-BAN-shees) were a British rock band formed in London in 1976 by vocalist Siouxsie Sioux and bassist Steven Severin. The Times called them "one of the most audacious and uncompromising musical adventurers of the post-punk era".

With guitarist John McKay and drummer Kenny Morris, they created "a form of post-punk discord full of daring rhythmic and sonic experimentation". Their debut album The Scream (1978) received widespread acclaim. Following membership changes, including the addition of guitarist John McGeoch and drummer Budgie, they changed their musical direction and became one of the most successful alternative pop groups of the 1980s. Their third album Kaleidoscope (1980) peaked at number 5 on the UK Albums Chart. With Juju (1981) which also reached the top 10, they became an influence on the emerging gothic scene.

The band made a breakthrough in North America with the multifaceted album Peepshow (1988), which received critical praise. With substantial support from alternative rock radio stations, they achieved a mainstream hit in the US in 1991 with the pop single "Kiss Them for Me". Siouxsie and the Banshees' other best-known songs include "Hong Kong Garden" (1978), "Happy House" (1980), "Spellbound" (1981), "Cities in Dust" (1985) and "Peek-a-Boo" (1988). During their career, Siouxsie and the Banshees released 11 studio albums and 30 singles. The band experienced several line-up changes, with Siouxsie and Severin being the only constant members. They disbanded in 1996.

The band were post-punk pioneers. They have been widely influential, both on contemporaries and later acts. They have been cited as an influence by bands such as Joy Division, the Cure, U2, Radiohead, and singers such as Tricky and Jeff Buckley.

== History ==
=== Formation (1976–1977) ===
Siouxsie Sioux and Steven Severin met at a Roxy Music concert in September 1975, at a time when glam rock had faded and there was nothing new coming through with which they could identify. From February 1976, Siouxsie, Severin and some friends began to follow an unsigned band, the Sex Pistols. Journalist Caroline Coon dubbed them the "Bromley Contingent", as most of them came from the Bromley area of south-east London, a label Severin came to despise. "There was no such thing, it was just a bunch of people drawn together by the way they felt and they looked". They were all inspired by the Sex Pistols and their uncompromising attitude. When they learned that one of the bands scheduled to play the 100 Club Punk Festival, organised by Sex Pistols manager Malcolm McLaren, was pulling out from the bill at the last minute, Siouxsie suggested that she and Severin play, even though they had no band name or additional members. Two days later, the pair appeared at the festival held in London on 20 September 1976. With two borrowed musicians at their side, Marco Pirroni on guitar and Sid Vicious on drums, their set consisted of a 20-minute improvisation based on "The Lord's Prayer".

The band intended to split up after the gig, but they were asked to play again. Over the next few months, Siouxsie and Severin recruited drummer Kenny Morris and guitarist Peter Fenton. After playing several gigs in early 1977, they realised that Fenton did not fit in because he was "a real rock guitarist"; he was fired on stage in mid-May. John McKay took his place in July. Their first live appearance on television took place in November on Granada Television (based in Manchester), on Tony Wilson's TV show So It Goes. In that month they also recorded their first John Peel session for BBC radio, in which they premiered a new song, "Metal Postcard"; this introduced a "motorik austerity" in the drum patterns, along with "space in the sound" and "serrated guitars". The band described their music as "cold, machine-like and passionate at the same time". When they appeared on the cover of Sounds magazine, Vivien Goldman wrote: "they sound like a 21st-century industrial plant".

=== The Scream and Join Hands (1978–1979) ===
The band sold-out venues in London in early 1978, but still had problems getting the right recording contract that could give them "complete artistic control". Polydor offered this guarantee and signed them in June. Their first single, "Hong Kong Garden", featuring a xylophone motif, reached the top 10 in the UK shortly after. An NME review hailed it as "a bright, vivid narrative, something like snapshots from the window of a speeding Japanese train, power charged by the most original, intoxicating guitar playing I heard in a long, long time".

The band released their debut album, The Scream, in November 1978. Nick Kent of NME said of the record: "Certainly, the traditional three-piece sound has never been used in a more unorthodox fashion with such stunning results".

The Banshees' second album, Join Hands, was released in 1979. In Melody Maker, Jon Savage described "Poppy Day" as "a short, powerful evocation of the Great War graveyards", and Record Mirror described the whole record as a dangerous work that "should be heard". The Banshees embarked on a major tour to promote the album. A few dates into the tour in September, Morris and McKay left an in-store signing after an argument and quit the band. In need of replacements to fulfil tour dates, the Banshees' manager called drummer Budgie, formerly with the Slits, and asked him to audition. Budgie was hired, but Siouxsie and Severin had no success auditioning guitarists. Robert Smith of the Cure offered his services in case they could not find a guitarist (his group were already the support band on the tour); having already seen too many "rock virtuosos", the band accepted his assistance. The tour resumed in September; after the last concert, Smith returned to the Cure.

=== Kaleidoscope, Juju and A Kiss in the Dreamhouse (1980–1982) ===
Budgie became a permanent member, and the band entered the studios to record the single "Happy House" with guitarist John McGeoch, then still a member of Magazine. Their third album, Kaleidoscope, released in 1980, saw the Banshees exploring new musical territories with the use of other instruments like synthesizers, sitars and drum machines. The group initially had a concept of making each song sound completely different, without regard to whether or not the material could be performed live. Melody Maker described the result as "a kaleidoscope of sound and imagery, new forms, and content, flashing before our eyes". Kaleidoscope was a commercial success, peaking at number 5 on the UK albums chart. This line-up, featuring McGeoch on guitar, toured the United States for the first time in support of the album in November 1980.

Siouxsie and the Banshees in 1981, left to right: Budgie, Siouxsie, Steven Severin and John McGeoch

For Juju (1981), the band took a different approach and practised the songs in concert first before recording them. Juju, according to Severin, became an unintentional concept album that "drew on darker elements". Sounds hailed it as "intriguing, intense, brooding and powerfully atmospheric". The album later peaked at number 7 on the UK albums chart and became one of their biggest sellers. McGeoch's guitar contributions on Juju were later praised by Johnny Marr of the Smiths.

During the 1981 accompanying tour, Siouxsie and Budgie secretly became a couple. At the same time, they debuted a drum-and-voice duo the Creatures, releasing their first EP, Wild Things.

The Banshees followed in 1982 with the psychedelic A Kiss in the Dreamhouse. The record, featuring strings on several numbers, was an intentional contrast to their previous work, with Severin later describing it as a "sexy album". The British press greeted it enthusiastically. Richard Cook finished his NME review with this sentence: "I promise...this music will take your breath away". At that time, McGeoch was struggling with alcohol problems, and was hospitalised on his return to a promotional trip from Madrid. The band fired him shortly thereafter. Severin asked Robert Smith to take over guitarist duties again; Smith accepted and rejoined the group in November 1982.

=== Hyæna, Tinderbox and Through the Looking Glass (1983–1987) ===
During 1983, the band members worked separately; Siouxsie and Budgie composed the first Creatures album, Feast, while Severin and Smith recorded as the Glove. Smith then insisted on documenting his time with the Banshees, so the group released a cover version of the Beatles' "Dear Prudence" in September 1983. It became their biggest UK hit, reaching number 3 on the Singles Chart. They also released a live double album and video, Nocturne, and completed their sixth studio album, Hyæna. Shortly before its release in May 1984, Smith left the group, citing health issues due to an overloaded schedule, being in two bands at once.

With ex-Clock DVA guitarist John Valentine Carruthers replacing Smith, the Banshees then reworked four numbers from their repertoire, augmented by a string section, for The Thorn EP. NME praised the project: "The power of a classical orchestra is the perfect foil for the band's grindingly insistent sounds". The new Banshees line-up spent much of 1985 working on a new record, Tinderbox. The group finished the song "Cities in Dust" before the album, so they rushed its release as a single prior to their longest tour of the UK. Tinderbox was released in April 1986. Sounds magazine said: "Tinderbox is a refreshing slant on the Banshees' disturbing perspective and restores their vivid shades to pop's pale palette". Due to the length of time spent working on Tinderbox, the group desired spontaneity and decided to record an album of cover songs, Through the Looking Glass (1987). Mojo magazine later praised their version of "Strange Fruit". After the album's release, the band realised Carruthers was no longer fitting in and decided to work on new material as a trio.

=== Peepshow (1988–1990) ===
Following a lengthy break, the band recruited multi-instrumentalist Martin McCarrick and guitarist Jon Klein. The quintet recorded a multifaceted album, Peepshow in 1988, with non-traditional rock instrumentation including cello and accordion. Q magazine praised the album in its 5-star review: "Peepshow takes place in some distorted fairground of the mind where weird and wonderful shapes loom". The first single, "Peek-a-Boo", was seen by critics as a "brave move" with horns and dance elements. Sounds wrote: "The snare gets slapped, Siouxsie's voice meanders all around your head and it all comes magically together". "Peek-a-Boo" was their first real breakthrough in the United States, peaking at number 52 on the Billboard Hot 100. After the tour, the band decided to take a break, with Siouxsie and Budgie recording as the Creatures and releasing their most critically acclaimed album, Boomerang, while Severin and McCarrick worked on material together.

=== Superstition, The Rapture and break-up (1991–1999) ===
In 1991, Siouxsie and the Banshees returned with the single "Kiss Them for Me", mixing strings over a dance rhythm laced with exotica. The group collaborated with the then unknown Indian tabla player Talvin Singh, who also sang during the bridge. The single received glowing reviews and later peaked at number 23 on the Billboard Hot 100, allowing them to reach a new audience. The album Superstition followed shortly afterwards, and the group toured the US as second headliners of the inaugural Lollapalooza tour. The following year, the Banshees were asked to compose "Face to Face" as a single for the film Batman Returns, at director Tim Burton's request.

In 1993, the Banshees recorded new songs based on string arrangements, and then played them in festivals abroad. On their return home, they hired former Velvet Underground member John Cale to produce the rest of the record. Released in 1995, The Rapture was described by Melody Maker as "a fascinating, transcontinental journey through danger and exotica". A few weeks after its release, Polydor dropped the band from its roster and Klein was replaced on the band's last tour in 1995 by ex-Psychedelic Furs guitarist Knox Chandler.

In April 1996, the Banshees disbanded after 20 years of working together. Siouxsie blamed the split on "the situation with Polydor" and "internal problems as well." She and Budgie announced that they would carry on recording as the Creatures. In 1999, they released the album Anima Animus.

=== Post-disbandment (2000s–present) ===
In 2002, Universal Music kicked off the band's remastered back catalogue by releasing The Best of Siouxsie and the Banshees. In April, Siouxsie, Severin, Budgie and Chandler reunited briefly for the Seven Year Itch tour, which spawned The Seven Year Itch live album and DVD. The day after their last concert in Tokyo, Japan, Siouxsie and Budgie stayed in town on their own and entered a recording studio as the Creatures. Their fourth and final studio album, Hái!, came out in 2003.

On 4 March 2004, McGeoch died in his sleep after an epileptic seizure, at the age of 48. Siouxsie and Budgie had talked about inviting him to guest with them on stage, before hearing the news. In November of the same year, Downside Up, a box set that collected all of the Banshees' B-sides and The Thorn EP, was released. The Times wrote in its review: "here is a group that never filled B-sides with inferior, throwaway tracks. Rather they saw them as an outlet for some of their most radical and challenging work".

In 2006, the band's first four records were remastered and compiled with previously unreleased bonus tracks. Several recordings made for the John Peel radio show from 1978 to 1986 were also compiled on the CD Voices on the Air: The Peel Sessions. AllMusic described the first session as "a fiery statement of intent" and qualified the other performances as "excellent". Eleven years after the split of the Banshees, Siouxsie released her debut solo album Mantaray in 2007. The second batch of the remasters, concerning the band's 1982–1986 era, was issued in April 2009. It included four other reissues (including A Kiss in the Dreamhouse from 1982). The At the BBC box set, containing a DVD with all of the band's UK live television performances and three CDs with in-concert recordings, was also released in June of the same year.

In 2014, their last four studio albums (1987's Through the Looking Glass, 1988's Peepshow, 1991's Superstition and 1995's The Rapture) were reissued on CD in remastered versions with bonus tracks. Siouxsie and Severin curated a compilation CD called It's a Wonderfull Life for the monthly magazine Mojo, issued in September with Siouxsie on the front cover. On this CD, the pair honoured several composers of film and classical music that had inspired them. In 2015, after releasing another compilation called Spellbound: The Collection, which included a selection of singles, album tracks and B-sides such as "Tattoo" and "Hong Kong Garden" (Strings Intro version), the band reissued 1979's Join Hands on vinyl for Record Store Day, with different cover artwork. A vinyl reissue series on Polydor of all of the band's albums, remastered from the original ¼" tapes in 2018 by Miles Showell and cut at half speed at Abbey Road Studios, began in August 2018. The eleven studio albums were reissued on black vinyl.

A 10 track compilation titled All Souls was released in 2022. The album's track list was curated by Siouxsie and features "Spellbound" (licensed for season four of series Stranger Things), "Fireworks", "Peek-a-Boo", plus album tracks and rarities. It was released on black vinyl, and orange vinyl. In 2023 The Rapture was reissued on double colored vinyl. In October 2024 Through the Looking Glass including "The Passenger", was reissued on crystal clear vinyl with new artwork featuring a mirror effect sleeve. In 2025, All Souls was released on CD in a limited edition with an obi strip, in the form of Japanese mini-LP replica in cardboard sleeve.

On 15 January 2026, Morris died at the age of 68 after a short illness. In July, Mojo magazine published in their Collector's Series, a Siouxsie and the Banshees special issue.

On 20 November 2026, Downside Up, a box set collecting all the B-sides recorded by the band, was released on vinyl for the first time in a 5 LP edition. Downside Up was also reissued in a 3 CD edition. The 49 B-sides were newly remastered at Abbey Road studio. A US version of the band's official website has also been launched to coincide with the news. Siouxsie also gave her first long interview in a decade for Uncut magazine, for which she appeared on the front cover of the November issue.

== Artistry ==
=== Musical style ===
Siouxsie and the Banshees are recognized as post-punk pioneers. They have been described as developing "a form of post-punk discord full of daring rhythmic and sonic experimentation". The Times wrote that "The Banshees stand proudly [... as] one of the most audacious and uncompromising musical adventurers of the post-punk era". With some of their darkest material, the band also helped spawn the gothic scene. The band is also considered a new wave act.

They were also one of the first alternative bands; music historian Peter Buckley pointed out that they were at "the very front of the alternative-rock scene". In 1988, "Peek-a-Boo" was the first track to top the US Modern Rock chart after Billboard launched this chart in the first week of September to list the most played songs on alternative and college radio stations. Simon Goddard wrote that the "Banshees – Mk II would become one of the biggest alternative pop groups of the 1980s". Spin described them as "alternative rockers" in 1991 when referring to their presence in the top 40 chart. Noting the band's participation in the first Lollapalooza festival, journalist Jim Gerr saw them as one of the "elements of the alternative rock community". Mojo retrospectively presented them as one of "alternative rock's iconic groups".

When commenting on the lyrics of the first two Banshees albums, Severin said that they were about "madness, and childhood, and escaping suburbia, which are themes that hadn't been dealt with at all in rock music or pop music before".

=== Influences ===
The band cited the Velvet Underground, the Beatles, Iggy Pop and the Stooges amongst their first influences. At their beginnings, they also shared a common interest for the "glamorous art rock" of David Bowie, Roxy Music and T. Rex. They also had "a love for Can, Kraftwerk and Neu!". The films of Alfred Hitchcock were also influential.

== Legacy ==
Siouxsie and the Banshees have impacted many genres including post-punk, new wave, synth pop, gothic rock, alternative music, shoegaze and trip hop. They have been cited as influential by a wide range of musicians such as Joy Division, the Cure, the Smiths, Depeche Mode, PJ Harvey, Radiohead, Jeff Buckley, Tricky and LCD Soundsystem.

Joy Division's Peter Hook, who saw the group in concert in Manchester in 1977, said: "Siouxsie and the Banshees were one of our big influences ... The Banshees first LP was one of my favourite ever records, the way the guitarist and the drummer played was a really unusual way of playing". Joy Division drummer Stephen Morris was influenced by the Banshees Mk1 from their 1977's John Peel session because their "first drummer Kenny Morris played mostly toms" and "the sound of cymbals was forbidden". He added, "The Banshees had that ... foreboding sound, sketching out the future from the dark of the past". Joy Division producer Martin Hannett saw a difference between the Banshees' first main line-up and the other bands of 1977: "Any harmonies you got were stark, to say the least, except for the odd exception, like Siouxsie. They were interesting". The Cure's leader, Robert Smith, declared in 2003: "Siouxsie and the Banshees and Wire were the two bands I really admired. They meant something." He also pinpointed what the 1979 Join Hands tour brought him musically. "On stage that first night with the Banshees, I was blown away by how powerful I felt playing that kind of music. It was so different to what we were doing with the Cure. Before that, I'd wanted us to be like the Buzzcocks or Elvis Costello, the punk Beatles. Being a Banshee really changed my attitude to what I was doing". Killing Joke cited the band in their influences: guitarist Geordie Walker praised "the Banshees on The Scream" for bringing "chord structures that I found very refreshing".

The two songwriters of the Smiths cited them; singer Morrissey said that "Siouxsie and the Banshees were excellent", and that "they were one of the great groups of the late 1970s, early 1980s". He also said in 1994: "If you study modern groups, those who gain press coverage and chart action, none of them are as good as Siouxsie and the Banshees at full pelt. That's not dusty nostalgia, that's fact". When asked "who do you regret not going to see live", guitarist Johnny Marr replied "Siouxsie and the Banshees mk 1. But mk 2 were even better". Marr remembered the Juju tour: "They were the best band around at that time". Marr also mentioned his liking for John McGeoch and his contribution to the single "Spellbound". He qualified it as "clever" with a "really good picky thing going on which is very un-rock'n'roll". Smiths' historian Goddard wrote that Marr "praise[d] the McGeoch-era Banshees as a significant inspiration". U2 cited Siouxsie and the Banshees as a major influence and selected "Christine" for a Mojo compilation. The Edge was the presenter of an award given to Siouxsie at the Mojo ceremony in 2005. In December 1981, Dave Gahan of Depeche Mode named the Banshees as one of his three favourite bands, along with Sparks and Roxy Music. Gahan later hailed the single "Candyman" at its release, saying, "She always sounds exciting. She sings with a lot of sex – that's what I like. This is a great Banshees record ..., I like their sound. I used to see them quite a lot when I was younger." Commenting on the original Banshees line-up and how they were different from other groups, Gahan said: "Siouxsie And The Banshees, whom I adored, sang much more abstract, artistic about frustration. Colder and darker". Jim Reid of the Jesus and Mary Chain selected "Jigsaw Feeling" from The Scream as being among his favourite songs. Jim Reid wrote that in 1978 bands were doing something new; "The Banshees were one of them and their first record is one of my favourites". Thurston Moore of Sonic Youth listed "Hong Kong Garden" in his top 25 all-time favourite songs, saying "it was a completely new world". Kevin Shields of My Bloody Valentine also mentioned them as being among his early influences.

The Banshees have been praised by other acts. Thom Yorke said that seeing Siouxsie on stage in concert in 1985 inspired him to become a performer at the center of the stage. Radiohead cited McGeoch-era Siouxsie records when mentioning the recording of the song "There There", and rehearsed Banshees' material prior to their 2008 tour. Jeff Buckley said during a press conference in Lyon, France in March 1995: "Siouxsie, I have much of her influence in my voice". Buckley covered "Killing Time" (from the Boomerang album) on various occasions. Buckley also owned all the Banshees' albums. When asked what were his influences, Buckley replied: "I grew up for the 1960s, early 1970s, 1980s, so I observed Joni Mitchell, I observed the Smiths and Siouxsie and the Banshees. That turns me on completely". Suede singer Brett Anderson named Juju as one of his favourite records. Red Hot Chili Peppers performed "Christine" in concert, and their guitarist John Frusciante cited the Banshees in interviews. Garbage singer Shirley Manson stated, "I learned how to sing listening to The Scream and Kaleidoscope". Siouxsie has also been praised by other female singers including PJ Harvey and Courtney Love. PJ Harvey has stated, "It's hard to beat Siouxsie Sioux, in terms of live performance. She is so exciting to watch, so full of energy and human raw quality", and selected Siouxsie's album Anima Animus in her top 10 albums of 1999. The band had a strong effect on two important trip hop acts: Tricky covered the 1983's proto-trip-hop song "Tattoo" to open his second album, Nearly God. The original version of "Tattoo" aided Tricky in the creation of his style. Massive Attack heavily sampled "Metal Postcard" on the song "Superpredators (Metal Postcard)", recorded prior to their Mezzanine album. Air's Jean-Benoît Dunckel cited the group as one of his three main influences. Billy Corgan of the Smashing Pumpkins cited the Banshees as an important influence on his music. Faith No More covered "Switch" in concert and cited The Scream as one of their influences.

The Banshees continue to influence younger musicians. Singer James Murphy was marked by certain Banshees albums during his childhood. His band LCD Soundsystem covered "Slowdive" as a B-side to the single "Disco Infiltrator". The Beta Band sampled "Painted Bird" on their track "Liquid Bird" from the Heroes to Zeros album. TV on the Radio said that they have always tried to make a song that begins like "Kiss Them for Me" where all of a sudden, there's an "element of surprise" with "a giant drum coming in". Santigold based one of her songs around the music of "Red Light". "'My Superman' is an interpolation of 'Red Light'". Indie folk group DeVotchKa covered the ballad "The Last Beat of My Heart" at the suggestion of Arcade Fire singer Win Butler; it was released on the Curse Your Little Heart EP. Gossip named the Banshees as one of their major influences during the promotion of their single "Heavy Cross". British indie band Bloc Party took inspiration from "Peek-a-Boo" and their singer Kele Okereke stated about that Banshees' single: "it sounded like nothing else on this planet. This is ... a pop song that they put out in the middle of their career ... to me it sounded like the most current but most futuristic bit of guitar-pop music I've heard". A Perfect Circle's Billy Howerdel said that the Banshees were "top three favorite bands for me". The Weeknd sampled different parts of "Happy House" for his song "House of Balloons", and also used the chorus of the initial version.

Barney Hoskyns of NME said that "Siouxsie and the Banshees are one of the great British bands of all time."

In 2022, guitarists John Frusciante, Johnny Marr, and Ed O'Brien gave interviews for a book about John McGeoch, particularly his work with the Banshees. The Light Pours Out Of Me: The Authorised Biography Of John McGeoch was published by Omnibus Press.

== Band members ==
Core members

- Siouxsie Sioux – lead vocals, occasional guitar, keyboards and percussion (1976–1996, 2002)
- Steven Severin – bass, keyboards (1976–1996, 2002)
- Budgie – drums, percussion, harmonica (1979–1996, 2002)

Other members

- Kenny Morris – drums, percussion (1977–1979; died 2026)
- Peter Fenton – guitar (1977)
- John McKay – guitar, saxophone (1977–1979)
- Robert Smith – guitar, keyboards (1982–1984, touring 1979)
- John McGeoch – guitar, keyboards (1980–1982; died 2004)
- John Valentine Carruthers – guitar, keyboards (1984–1987)
- Martin McCarrick – keyboards, cello, accordion, dulcimer (1987–1996)
- Jon Klein – guitar (1987–1994)
- Knox Chandler – guitar (1995–1996, 2002)

Live members

- Marco Pirroni – guitar (1976)
- Sid Vicious – drums (1976; died 1979)

== Discography ==
=== Studio albums ===
- The Scream (1978)
- Join Hands (1979)
- Kaleidoscope (1980)
- Juju (1981)
- A Kiss in the Dreamhouse (1982)
- Hyæna (1984)
- Tinderbox (1986)
- Through the Looking Glass (1987)
- Peepshow (1988)
- Superstition (1991)
- The Rapture (1995)
