= Steven Severin =

English musician

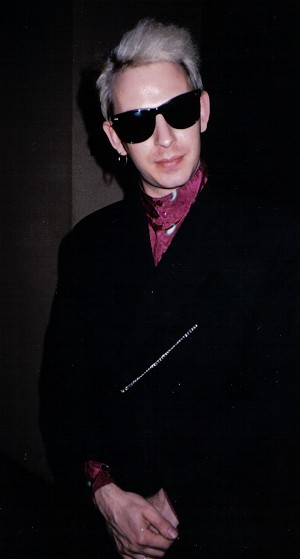
- Severin in 1986

Background information
- Born: Steven John Bailey; 25 September 1955 (age 71); Highgate, London, England
- Genres: Post-punk; gothic rock; alternative rock; new wave
- Occupations: Musician; songwriter; producer
- Instruments: Bass guitar; keyboards
- Years active: 1976–present
- Labels: Polydor; Geffen; RE: Subconscious Music
- Formerly of: Siouxsie and the Banshees; The Glove
- Website: stevenseverin.com

Steven John Bailey (born 25 September 1955), known as Steven Severin, is an English songwriter, composer, multi-instrumentalist and producer. He was the bassist of the rock band Siouxsie and the Banshees which he co-founded in 1976. He was also the co-founder of the short-lived band the Glove in 1983. He took the name "Severin" from the Leopold von Sacher-Masoch character who is mentioned in the Velvet Underground song "Venus in Furs". After the split of Siouxsie and the Banshees in 1996, Severin created his own label RE: and released several instrumental albums via his official website. In the late 2000s and the early 2010s, he performed live in solo, playing music over footage of silent films.

As of 2026 he continues to record and regularly release albums.

== Biography ==
He grew up in Archway and moved to Bromley at the age of 11. On a Sunday afternoon in 1971, he discovered German rock band Can thanks to a schoolfriend's elder brother who was in the army and was stationed in Hamburg. At 15, Severin saw Captain Beefheart & His Magic Band in concert in London which was a life changing experience.

His favourite writers when he was a teenager, were William Burroughs and Jean Genet amongst others: he said, "Since I was very young I’ve always felt the need to retreat into my head and scratch around the rim of my imagination to shut out the trivia and carelessness of the world outside".

=== Siouxsie and the Banshees ===
Severin — who was known as Steven Havoc when he joined the band in September 1976 — was the co-founder with Siouxsie Sioux of Siouxsie and the Banshees; he had also earlier considered "Steve Spunker" for his stage name. He was a full contributor to the band's musical output from the first release: the B-side "Voices" to the top 10 single "Hong Kong Garden" was a Severin lyric.

Although the entire band often was credited for songwriting, the lyrics were usually indicated as the work of only one or two members. Severin would contribute lyrics to many of the album tracks, singles and B-sides produced by the band. He also initially wrote many of the songs recorded by the band, composing earlier versions that the band would work together to perfect. In the same way he would add his input into potential tracks contributed by Siouxsie Sioux or others.

He recorded 11 studio albums with the group. Since their split in 1996, he has been supervising the entire back-catalogue, choosing extra tracks for reissues.

=== The Glove ===
Severin's work outside the Banshees, in this period, is however most known for the Glove, his side project with the Cure's (and then current Banshee guitarist) Robert Smith. Severin's first studio collaboration with Smith was to co-produce an early version of the Cure's song "Lament" for Flexipop magazine in August 1982. They then started to compose material later in 1982. Severin played bass with the Cure for a one-off live TV appearance on BBC's Riverside in January 1983, for a rendition of "Siamese Twins" with the strings players of the Venomettes.

Severin and Smith composed a second block of songs for the Glove in early 1983. Severin came up with the name, the title and the blue/yellow sleeve concept. This led to the release of the album Blue Sunshine and two attendant singles. The album reached number 35 in the UK albums chart in 1983 and the single "Like an Animal" peaked just outside the UK top 50. The next single from the album, "Punish Me with Kisses", only just made it into the top 100. Though Smith did sing on a few tracks, the featured vocalist is Jeanette Landray – a friend of Banshee drummer Budgie who was at the time involved in progressing a musical relationship with Siouxsie under the Creatures banner. The album is noted for its low-level musical interludes between tracks.

Musically close enough to the differing Cure and Banshee styles to attract large sections of both sets of fans, the more experimental nature and references to 1960's psychedelia and pop-art also attracted a more eclectic audience. The use of keyboards and synthesizers, as well as the inclusion of instrumental only tracks, were also an early pointer to Severin's post Banshee musical output.

=== Other artists and bands ===
During his tenure with Siouxsie and the Banshees, Severin was also involved in records by other bands, often with Banshees connections. Altered Images had toured as a support act for Siouxsie and the Banshees and Severin produced their first two singles "Dead Pop Stars" and "A Day's Wait". He also produced the majority of the album Happy Birthday (all 1981). The only track not produced by him was the title track (which also formed the intro and coda), which became the band's breakthrough hit. When the record company realised that "Happy Birthday" had a commercial potential, they asked Martin Rushent to re-record it at the last minute.

In 1982, he produced, and played bass on, the Lydia Lunch EP The Agony Is the Ecstasy and in 1983 co-wrote the song "Torment" with Marc Almond on the latter's LP Torment and Toreros (by Marc and the Mambas). In 1985, he produced an EP of the Flowerpot Men, titled Jo's so mean to Josephine which "has become a proto-techno classic". In the late 1980s, he played as musician and did some programming on an album written by singer Catharine Buchanan. Presenting... Catharine Buchanan, was issued in 2024 via Severin's website.

=== Solo work: 1989–present ===
Severin's post-Banshees output was the Visions of Ecstasy soundtrack, created for the Nigel Wingrove short film interpretation of the writings of Saint Teresa of Avila. This 1989 sensual fantasy film remained unreleased until 2012, as it has been refused a certificate on the grounds of blasphemy – the only film so banned by The British Board of Film Classification. The four parts written by Severin for the soundtrack, "Sphere", "Come Deliver Us", "Skin Crawl" and "Transverberation of the Heart", formed the basis of his first post-Banshees release. Almost 10 years after creating the Visions of Ecstasy soundtrack, Severin released an album entitled Visions, featuring four tracks derived from the original pieces written for the film, plus another five instrumentals. Severin completely reworked the soundtrack – originally eighteen minutes long – into a forty-five-minute ambient album. It was also the first release by Severin's RE: records label. The record also featured Banshees' cello player and keyboardist Martin McCarrick. Visions was first only available via his website and was then distributed by Cargo.

In 1999, Severin released Maldoror. The origins for this instrumental album were as far back as 1993, when Severin wrote some tracks for Brazilian Theatre Company "Os Satyros" production of Lautréamont's Chants of Maldoror. After losing and regaining contact with the group, Severin composed further pieces for the 1998 production Os Cantos des Maldoror. These pieces were collected together and released on CD. That same year, Severin had been invited to be musical director for the Canadian dance company "Holy Body Tattoo" on CIRCA – described as a 70-minute multimedia "celebration of the sensual forces of submission and control" – a postmodern deconstruction of the tango that interwove film footage by William Morrison and original music by Severin, Warren Ellis and cult cabaret trio The Tiger Lillies. The music from CIRCA was largely drawn from Martyn Jacques and company's album Circus Songs. Severin contributed keyboards and also produced this album for the Tiger Lillies.

Severin's third RE: release, The Woman in the Dunes was specially commissioned by Shakti and the Vasanta Mala dance company to accompany the stage production of the Kōbō Abe novel of the same name. It premiered at the ICA in the summer of 2000. The only vocal included is "I Put a Spell on You"; a version of the Screaming Jay Hawkins classic sung by Jarboe (ex Swans).

Severin returned to composing soundtracks, and in 2003 film director Robert Pratten approached Severin to compose the soundtrack for his first film, a British independent supernatural thriller called London Voodoo. The film contained four tracks that Severin collaborated on with his wife and songwriting partner Arban, under the name "Darling Hate". As a result of this new direction, Severin wound down his RE: label to concentrate on writing for film and television.

London Voodoo was followed by a soundtrack for The Purifiers, the second film feature by Richard Jobson, which premiered at the Edinburgh Film Festival in 2004. The tracks extensively used in the score were "Enter Into These Bonds" from Visions and "Prelude:Europa" from Maldoror.

In 2005, Severin released another album based on a soundtrack originally commissioned by the Indo/Japanese performer Shakti in August 2003 for her interpretation of the story of Beauty and the Beast. The album Beauty and the Beast is credited to Arban and Steven Severin. It was the first release on their Subconscious Music label. Though jointly credited, the 50-minute score was created in an original manner which owed much to the circumstances in producing it. As it was commissioned to accompany a dance production, the titles and timing of each individual part was already decided upon by Shakti, who also suggested the theme for each piece. Owing to other commitments upon their time, it was decided by Arban and Severin that each would work on alternating pieces individually. Arban Severin took responsibility for the odd-numbered tracks and Severin for the others. After a piece was substantially completed it was given over to the other partner to review and to make contributions. Only when both parties were satisfied was the track considered finished.

This method of working was renewed for the following project, the soundtrack for director Paul Burrow's psychological thriller "Nature Morte" (Still Life). This film score recording was released on 16 October 2006, again under the Subconscious Music label. In the mid-2000s, Severin left London and moved to Scotland to reside in Edinburgh.

In 2008, Severin started composing scores for silent films of the 1920s and 1930s, the first being Germaine Dulac’s The Seashell and the Clergyman: he also made scores for 6 short films and got in contact with Picturehouse, to play in their cinemas in the UK. The first "Music for Silents" show was done in May.

In 2009, Severin and Arban scored director Matthew Mishory's film Delphinium: A Childhood Portrait of Derek Jarman, a tribute to Steven's old friend Derek Jarman. The film has been permanently installed in the British Film Institute's National Film Archive, in the special collection Beautiful Things, "a major collection of over 100 films and television programmes that chronicle and explore queer representation and identities over the last century".

In 2010 Severin released his debut album for Cold Spring titled Blood of a Poet. The album is a recording of his soundtrack for a 1930 silent movie by Jean Cocteau which was screened alongside his live performance at Montreal's Fantasia festival. After the premiere of the tour performed at The Hollywood Silent Film Theatre in Los Angeles, a UK tour took place in autumn 2010.

In 2011, Severin and Arban renewed their collaboration with filmmaker Matthew Mishory, scoring his feature film Joshua Tree, 1951: A Portrait of James Dean: the film would be released a couple of years later. That year, Severin also composed a score to Theodor Dreyer's Vampyr; it was his second collaboration with the label Cold Spring. Vampyr was the longest score he ever attempted. It completed a trilogy that had started with The Seashell & The Clergyman then Blood of a Poet. He then went on tour in Europe in 2012.

After a hiatus of several years, he released in March 2017 via his website a 6-track album The Vril Harmonies, followed in April by another 8-track album Innocence and Blood and #002FA7 (International Klein Blue). In 2019, a 23 minute track titled 23 Wounds Of Julius Caesar (reincarnation) was dedicated to the memory of Jhon Balance (co-founder of the group Coil) and Peter Christopherson (of Throbbing Gristle).

In 2024, he released The Orphanage, which was "a new name for my compilation of homeless tracks. It incorporates Unisexdreamsalon and adds a further 8 previously unreleased, unheard tracks. [...] All good things". Other releases such as Black Matter for the King, The Bedlam Variations and Bunny Yeager is Missing followed.

His latest album Phases of the Black Out was out in November 2026.

== Influences ==
After first seeing Paul McCartney at an early age, the first bass player who impressed him was Jack Bruce. Then in the early 1970s, Can's Holger Czukay became his bass hero.

== Style ==
Severin played bass in an unusual way, hitting strings upside down with a guitar pick, from bottom to top. He commented: "It just came naturally. Moving slowly up and down seems so passive to me considering the music was so aggressive. It's also about the precision of every single note". Making Music noted that one of the band's most distinctive elements was a "thick heavy chordal bass style". Severin often played "three note chords and play triplets across them with the pick". When the band was a quartet, he and the guitarist tried to keep out of each other's way: "so that if John's playing down the bottom I'll play up the top... It's basically about filling the whole musical space, but we have three instruments to do that".

Severin stated that on the two first Banshees albums, "the bass had a sort of dynamic role, pushing and pumping". He then used different bass tunings. Consequently, there were a number of different bass guitars in the Banshees stage show, with different tunings. For certain songs, he tuned up two of the strings: "so I could use a simple shape and play the thing I wanted to play. Then it led on to all the shapes I played on a normally tuned guitar giving me a whole catalogue of new songs". In 1986, he explained he played A/C/D/A# instead of E/A/D/G.

Commenting his work as film composer, he said: " I dislike... signposts emotions... You just have to create a bed for the emotion that’s already there, to heighten it".

== Equipment ==
Severin used in concert the Fender Jazz bass. He also played on a Music Man StingRay, mainly in studio but not so much on stage, as "it tended not to be so thick-sounding".

He used Ampeg SVTs and a rack full of choruses, flangers, and octave dividers.

== Writing ==
In the late 1990s, Severin wrote several articles which were published in The Guardian and The Independent. In 2000, he published The Twelve Revelations; a collection of Severin's erotic prose/poetry, illustrated with line drawings by Catharyne Ward.

== Personal life ==
Severin is married and is the father of two children.

== Discography ==
For his works with Siouxsie and The Banshees, see Siouxsie and the Banshees discography.

=== Albums ===
- Visions (1998)
- Maldoror (1999)
- The Woman in the Dunes (2000)
- UnisexDreamSalon (2001)
- London Voodoo (Original Soundtrack) (2004)
- Beauty & The Beast (2005)
- Nature Morte (Original Soundtrack) (2006)
- Music for Silents (2008)
- Eros Plus Massacre (2009)
- Blood of a Poet (Cold Spring 2010)
- Vampyr (2012)
- The Vril Harmonies (2017)
- Innocence and Blood (2017)
- #002fa7 International Klein Blue (2017)
- 23 Wounds of Julius Caesar (reincarnation) (2019)
- The Telling (2021)
- Music for Film | Vol 1 (2024)
- Music for Film | Vol 2: The Ascent Of Money (2024)
- Codex Astra | Abrahadabra (2024) (recorded in 2009, remastered in 2024)
- Music for Film | Vol 3 (2024)
- Black Matter for the King (2024)
- The Bedlam Variations (2024)
- The Penthouse Needle Tapes (2025)
- Lúnasa Drone: Chronophagie (2026)
- Phases of the Black Out (2026)

=== Compilation ===
- The Orphanage (2024) (UnisexDreamSalon renamed and expanded with a selection of bonus tracks)

=== EPs ===
- SleeperCell (2010)
- Circles of Silver (2010)
- Hours of Gold (2010)
- Idols of Glass (2011)
- The Wand of Flame (2011)
- Bunny Yeager is Missing (2024)
- A Page of Madness, A Page Out of Order (2026)

=== Contributions ===
- Morbid Pleasures (2026) (a 12 disc Blu-ray box set): music recorded for two Georges Méliès shorts and the movies Eerie Tales and Sweeney Todd.
