= The Best of Siouxsie and the Banshees =

Greatest hits album by Siouxsie and the Banshees
- Released: 12 November 2002
- Recorded: 1978–1994
- Genres: Post-punk; alternative rock
- Length: 57:13 (Disc 1); 64:35 (Disc 2)
- Labels: Polydor Universal; Geffen (US)
- Producer: Various

Siouxsie and the Banshees compilations chronology
Twice Upon a Time – The Singles (1992)	The Best of Siouxsie and the Banshees (2002)	Downside Up (2004)

Professional ratings
Review scores
Source	Rating
AllMusic	3/5 stars

The Best of Siouxsie and the Banshees is a 2002 compilation by Siouxsie and the Banshees, released by Universal Music Group as the first reissue of the band's remastered back-catalogue. The most successful singles of the band were presented in a non-chronological order.

== Content ==
This best-of includes an unreleased track "Dizzy" (re-edited), only available on this CD; it was recorded in late 1994. The original version of "Dizzy" (version 1) was included on a one track CD sold at the Seven Year Itch concerts of 2002. "Dizzy" would later feature in the 2006 film Notes on a Scandal.

The Best of also includes for the first time the complete version of "This Wheel's on Fire" : the ending of the song is extended and does not fade out. Also, the Mark Saunders mix of "Stargazer" was used instead of the original album version.

The double CD edition also contains many remixes and an unreleased extended version of a non-album single from 1987, "Song from the Edge of the World". The bonus DVD includes music videos for all the featured songs on the main disc excluding "Dizzy".

== Release, reception and legacy ==
The Best of Siouxsie and the Banshees was released on 12 November 2002. It was issued in three editions; single disc, double CD and Sound & Vision double CD + DVD (the latter version was released in 2004 and re-issued on 1 October 2007).

When reviewing the compilation, Billboard talked about an "adventurous, sumptuous, and contagious pop".

Singer Spoek Mathambo selected the compilation in his 12 "favourite albums" list, explaining he discovered it during his formative years. "My friend gave me the Best Of album, and through college I just listened to it a lot: 'Israel', 'Dear Prudence', 'Hong Kong Garden', 'Peek-a-Boo'. [...] Siouxsie, for me, was very easy to listen to. Plus, the songs are super hooky".

== Track listing ==
Disc one
No.	Title	Album	Length
1.	"Dear Prudence"	Hyæna (US version, 1984)	3:48
2.	"Hong Kong Garden"	non-album single (1978)	2:52
3.	"Cities in Dust"	Tinderbox (1985)	4:06
4.	"Peek-a-Boo"	Peepshow (1988)	3:10
5.	"Happy House"	Kaleidoscope (1980)	3:48
6.	"Kiss Them for Me (7-inch edit)"	Superstition (1991)	4:37
7.	"Face to Face"	Batman Returns soundtrack (1992)	4:17
8.	"Dizzy (version 2)"	previously unreleased (1995)	3:10
9.	"Israel"	non-album single (1980)	4:54
10.	"Christine"	Kaleidoscope	3:00
11.	"Spellbound"	Juju (1981)	3:18
12.	"Stargazer (version mixed by Mark Saunders)"	The Rapture (1995)	3:14
13.	"Arabian Knights"	Juju	3:05
14.	"The Killing Jar (single version)"	Peepshow	4:04
15.	"This Wheel's on Fire (fade out-less version)"	Through The Looking Glass (1987)	5:17

Disc two

1. "Spellbound" (extended 12" #2 version)
2. "Song from the Edge of the World" (Columbus mix)
3. "Kiss Them for Me" (Kathak #2 mix)
4. "Peek-a-Boo" (Silver Dollar mix)
5. "The Killing Jar" (Lepidopteristic mix)
6. "Cities in Dust" (Eruption mix)
7. "Dazzle" (Glamour mix)
8. "Stargazer" (Mambo Sun remix)
9. "Face to Face" (Catatonic mix)

DVD

1. "Dear Prudence"
2. "Hong Kong Garden"
3. "Cities in Dust"
4. "Peek-a-Boo"
5. "Happy House"
6. "Kiss Them for Me"
7. "Face to Face"
8. "Israel"
9. "Christine"
10. "Spellbound"
11. "Stargazer"
12. "Arabian Knights"
13. "The Killing Jar"
14. "This Wheel's on Fire"

A 2 CD + 1 DVD Deluxe : sound & vision edition was released in June 2004 in a long box. It was re-issued in a digipack format in October 2007.
