= Downside Up =

Box set by Siouxsie and the Banshees
- Released: 29 November 2004
- Recorded: 1978–1994
- Genres: Post-punk; alternative rock
- Label: Polydor Universal
- Producer: Various

Siouxsie and the Banshees compilations chronology
The Best of Siouxsie and the Banshees (2002)	Downside Up (2004)	All Souls (2022)

2026 box set cover
- The 2026 box set sleeve

Professional ratings
Review scores
Source	Rating
AllMusic	3.5/5 stars
Record Collector	4/5 stars
Rock Sound	very favourable
Stylus	A
The Times	very favourable
Uncut	very favourable

Downside Up is a box set collecting all the B-sides from the catalogue of Siouxsie and the Banshees, first released on CD in 2004.

On 20 November 2026, Downside Up was released on vinyl for the first time in a 5LP box set, including a 32 page booklet with new liner notes by Siouxsie. The recordings were newly remastered at studio Abbey Road. Downside Up was also reissued on a 3CD edition with a booklet. Limited editions with an extra print were also available on the band's website for each set.

== Content ==
Most of these songs (only present on this box set) were classics of the band's live repertoire like "Pulled to Bits", "Eve White/Eve Black", "Red Over White", "I Promise", "Lullaby", "Something Blue", "El Día de los Muertos", "Return" and "B Side Ourselves".

== Release ==
The 2026 vinyl and CD editions reunited the band's 49 b-sides that were recorded in studio. The 2026 box sets omitted the two acoustic live versions of 1991 likewise The Thorn EP which will get a separate vinyl reissue.

== Reception ==
The Times wrote in its review of Downside Up: "Standouts include the spiky 'Drop Dead/Celebration', the sinister 'Eve White/Eve Black' and the chopped up industrial funk of 'Tattoo'". The reviewer rated the band as one of "the most audacious and uncompromising musical adventurers of the post-punk era". Stylus rated it A saying: "It’s a wonderfully eclectic mixture of fingers-down-a-blackboard avant-punk ('Voices (on the Air)', 'Eve White/Eve Black'), Creatures-esque tribal drum-worship ('Sunless'), majestic beauty ('Something Blue', 'Shooting Sun', 'Return'), amusing experimentation ('Slap Dash Snap', '(There's a) Planet in My Kitchen'), linguistic fun ('Mittageisen', 'Il est né, le divin Enfant', 'El Día de los Muertos') and, yes, playfully 'dark' tunes ('Something Wicked (This Way Comes)', 'Are You Still Dying, Darling?')."

Record Collector praised the box set for its "remarkable diversity, spontaneity and playfulness", saying that there are "No throwaway tracks". Murray Chalmers commented: "'Drop Dead/Celebration' is still a wonderful explosion of bile aimed at their absconded guitarist and drummer, while 'Slap Dash Snap' is prototype techno." He underlined the diversity of the material: "on more reflective tracks like 'Sea of Light' and 'Let Go' you feel that here is a group who could go anywhere". He stated that "By CD2 they are firing on all cylinders, a pop group thrillingly ahead of the pack, CD3 is immaculate", and considered the four tracks from The Thorn that end the box set as an "orchestrated EP of ferocious intensity". Rock Sound said: "Whilst most bands regard the B-side as an irrelevancy, a dumping ground for throwaway tracks not deemed good enough for proper release, Siouxsie and the Banshees always treated it with respect, an excuse to have fun and experiment." Neil Gardner praised "the sensual menace of 'Tattoo'". Uncut recognized Downside Up as "an exhaustive and fascinating collection from an astonishing group".

NME featured it in their list of "30 Killer B-Side And Rarities Albums You Might've Missed", in 2009 and wrote: "Manna from heaven for all Siouxsie and the Banshees obsessives, Downside Up is a four-CD box set of the band's B-sides and bonus material, including the spellbinding 'Tattoo' and 'Eve White/Eve Black'."

== Legacy ==
Tricky covered "Tattoo" as the opening number of his second solo album Nearly God (1996). The original version of "Tattoo" (1983), anticipated trip hop with its arrangements and production. In 1997, Massive Attack sampled "Mittageisen" on "Superpredators" for the soundtrack of The Jackal. Acts from other genres also selected some of these B-sides. Morrissey had "Eve White/Eve Black" played during intermission on his 1997's Maladjusted Tour. Shirley Manson of Garbage stated that "Drop Dead/Celebration" was one of her favourite tracks. Jenny Lee Lindberg of Warpaint mentioned her liking for "Umbrella", a song recorded in 1985.

== Track listing ==
=== 2004 box set ===
All songs by Siouxsie and the Banshees except*
All lyrics by Siouxsie Sioux except^

Disc one (1978–1982)

1. "Voices (on the Air)"^ (Lyric by Steven Severin) (Originally the b-side of "Hong Kong Garden")
2. "20th Century Boy"* (T. Rex cover) (Originally the b-side of "The Staircase (Mystery)")
3. "Pulled to Bits"^ (Lyric by Severin) (Originally the b-side of "Playground Twist")
4. "Mittageisen (Metal Postcard)" (Originally the A-side of "Mittageisen")
5. "Drop Dead/Celebration" (Originally the b-side of "Happy House")
6. "Eve White/Eve Black" (Originally the b-side of "Christine")
7. "Red Over White" (Originally the b-side of "Israel")
8. "Follow the Sun" (Originally the b-side of "Spellbound")
9. "Slap Dash Snap"^ (Lyric by Severin) (Originally the extra b-side of "Spellbound")
10. "Supernatural Thing"* (Ben E. King cover) (Originally the b-side of "Arabian Knights")
11. "Congo Conga" (Originally the extra b-side of "Arabian Knights")
12. "Coal Mind" (Originally the b-side of "Fireworks")
13. "We Fall" (Lyric by Severin) (Originally the extra b-side of "Fireworks")
14. "Cannibal Roses" (Originally the b-side of "Slowdive")
15. "Obsession II" (Originally the extra b-side of "Slowdive")
16. "A Sleeping Rain" (Originally the extra b-side of "Melt!")
17. "Il est né, le divin Enfant"* (traditional 18th century French carol) (Originally the b-side of "Melt!")

Disc two (1983–1987)

1. "Tattoo" (Originally the b-side of "Dear Prudence")
2. "(There's A) Planet in My Kitchen" (Originally the extra b-side of "Dear Prudence")
3. "Let Go" (Originally the b-side of "Swimming Horses")
4. "The Humming Wires" (Originally the extra b-side of "Swimming Horses")
5. "I Promise" (Originally the b-side of "Dazzle")
6. "Throw Them to the Lions"^ (Lyric by Severin) (Originally the extra b-side of "Dazzle")
7. "An Execution" (Originally the b-side of "Cities in Dust")
8. "The Quarterdrawing of the Dog" (Originally the extra b-side of"Cities in Dust")
9. "Lullaby"^ (Lyric by Severin) (Originally the b-side of "Candyman")
10. "Umbrella" (Originally the extra b-side of "Candyman")
11. "Shooting Sun" (Originally the b-side of "This Wheel's on Fire")
12. "Sleepwalking (On the High Wire)"^ (Lyric by Severin) (Originally the extra b-side of "This Wheel's on Fire")
13. "She Cracked"* (The Modern Lovers cover) (Originally the extra b-side of "This Wheel's on Fire" 1987 double-pack 7-inch)
14. "She's Cuckoo"^ (Lyric by Budgie) (Originally the b-side of "The Passenger")
15. "Something Blue" (Originally the extra b-side of "The Passenger")
16. "The Whole Price of Blood" (Originally the b-side of "Song from the Edge of the World")
17. "Mechanical Eyes" (Originally the extra b-side of "Song from the Edge of the World")

Disc three (1988–1995)

1. "False Face" (Originally the b-side of "Peek-a-Boo")
2. "Catwalk" (Originally the extra b-side of "Peek-a-Boo")
3. "Something Wicked (This Way Comes)" (Originally the b-side of "The Killing Jar")
4. "Are You Still Dying, Darling?" (Originally the extra b-side of "The Killing Jar")
5. "El Día de los Muertos" (Originally the b-side of "The Last Beat of My Heart")
6. "Sunless" (Originally the extra b-side of "The Last Beat of My Heart")
7. "Staring Back"^ (Lyric by Budgie) (Originally the extra b-side of "Kiss Them for Me")
8. "Return"^ (Lyric by Budgie and Siouxsie) (Originally the b-side of "Kiss Them for Me")
9. "Spiral Twist" (Originally the b-side of "Shadowtime")
10. "Sea of Light"^ (Lyric by Severin) (Originally the extra b-side of "Shadowtime")
11. "I Could Be Again" (Originally the b-side of "Face to Face")
12. "Hothead" (Originally the extra b-side of "Face to Face")
13. "B Side Ourselves" (Originally the b-side of "O Baby")
14. "Swimming Horses" (KROQ Acoustic Christmas, 1991) (Originally the extra b-side of "O Baby")
15. "All Tomorrow's Parties"* (Velvet Underground cover) (KROQ Acoustic Christmas, 1991) (Originally the extra b-side of "O Baby")
16. "Hang Me High"^ (Lyric by Budgie) (Originally the b-side of "Stargazer")
17. "Black Sun"^ (Lyric by Severin) (Originally the extra b-side of "Stargazer")

Disc Four The Thorn EP (1984)

1. "Overground"^ (Lyric by Severin) (Originally from The Thorn)
2. "Voices (on the Air)"^ (Lyric by Severin) (Originally from The Thorn)
3. "Placebo Effect" (Originally from The Thorn)
4. "Red Over White" (Originally from The Thorn)

Three songs were slightly re-edited for the purpose of the box set. "False Face" has a longer introduction with the first-sung line repeated. The first seconds of "Hang Me High" were edited out and "Black Sun" was given a remodelled ending.

For the B-sides recorded in 1983-84, guitarist Robert Smith recorded and co-composed only the track "There's a Planet in my Kitchen". The 1987 b-sides, "She's Cuckoo" and "Something Blue" were recorded as a trio: - guitarist John Valentine Carruthers had left the band by that time.

=== 2026 Vinyl edition ===
LP 1 (1978-1981)

A-side

1. Voices (On The Air)
2. 20th Century Boy
3. Pulled To Bits
4. Mittageisen (Metal Postcard)
5. Drop Dead / Celebration
6. Eve White / Eve Black

B-side

1. Red Over White
2. Follow The Sun
3. Slap Dash Snap
4. Supernatural Thing
5. Congo Conga

LP two (1982-1984)

A-side

1. Coal Mind
2. We Fall
3. Cannibal Roses
4. Obsession II
5. Il Est Né, Le Divin Enfant
6. A Sleeping Rain

B-side

1. Tattoo
2. (There's A) Planet In My Kitchen
3. Let Go
4. The Humming Wires

LP three (1984-1987)

A-side

1. I Promise
2. Throw Them To The Lions
3. An Execution
4. The Quarterdrawing Of The Dog

B-side

1. Lullaby
2. Umbrella
3. Shooting Sun
4. Sleepwalking (On The High Wire)
5. She Cracked

LP four (1987-1988)

A-side

1. She's Cuckoo
2. Something Blue
3. The Whole Price Of Blood
4. Mechanical Eyes
5. False Face

B-side

1. Catwalk
2. Something Wicked (This Way Comes) 4:21
3. Are You Still Dying, Darling? 4:45
4. El Dia De Los Muertos
5. Sunless

LP five (1991-1995)

A-side

1. Staring Back
2. Return
3. Spiral Twist
4. Sea Of Light

B-side

1. I Could Be Again
2. Hothead
3. B Side Ourselves
4. Hang Me High
5. Black Sun

All the songs are included in their original length.

=== 2026 CD box set ===
CD 1 (1978-1982)

1. Voices (On The Air)
2. 20th Century Boy
3. Pulled To Bits
4. Mittageisen (Metal Postcard)
5. Drop Dead / Celebration
6. Eve White / Eve Black
7. Red Over White
8. Follow The Sun
9. Slap Dash Snap
10. Supernatural Thing
11. Congo Conga
12. Coal Mind
13. We Fall
14. Cannibal Roses
15. Obsession II
16. Il Est Né, Le Divin Enfant
17. A Sleeping Rain

CD two (1983-1987)

1. Tattoo
2. (There's A) Planet In My Kitchen
3. Let Go
4. The Humming Wires
5. I Promise
6. Throw Them To The Lions
7. An Execution
8. The Quarterdrawing Of The Dog
9. Lullaby
10. Umbrella
11. Shooting Sun
12. Sleepwalking (On The High Wire)
13. She Cracked
14. She's Cuckoo
15. Something Blue
16. The Whole Price Of Blood
17. Mechanical Eyes

CD three (1988-1995)

1. False Face
2. Catwalk
3. Something Wicked (This Way Comes) 4:21
4. Are You Still Dying, Darling? 4:45
5. El Dia De Los Muertos
6. Sunless
7. Staring Back
8. Return
9. Spiral Twist
10. Sea Of Light
11. I Could Be Again
12. Hothead
13. B Side Ourselves
14. Hang Me High
15. Black Sun

All the songs are included in their original length.
