= Twice Upon a Time – The Singles =

Greatest hits album by Siouxsie and the Banshees
- Released: 5 October 1992
- Recorded: 1982–1992
- Genre: Post-punk; alternative rock
- Length: 76:00
- Label: Polydor; Geffen (US)
- Producer: Siouxsie & the Banshees; Mike Hedges; Stephen Hague

Siouxsie and the Banshees compilations chronology
Once Upon a Time/The Singles (1981)	Twice Upon a Time – The Singles (1992)	The Best of Siouxsie and the Banshees (2002)

Professional ratings
Review scores
Source	Rating
AllMusic	4.5/5 stars
Select	4/5

Twice Upon a Time – The Singles is the second singles compilation released by Siouxsie and the Banshees. It follows the same format as Once Upon a Time/The Singles, presenting the songs in chronological order. Twice picks up where Once left off (in 1982), and it includes several hits not included on regular Banshees studio albums. Instead of the studio version released as a single, "The Last Beat of My Heart" is presented as a live recording, from their performance at Lollapalooza in Seattle. Also appearing on CD for the first time here is "Face to Face", a song from the soundtrack of the film Batman Returns. "Fear (of the Unknown)" also appears as a "House of Fear" remix which is significantly different from the original version. The collection is missing the 1987 single "Song from the Edge of the World", which was included on a later hits collection.

== Reception ==
J. D. Considine of The Baltimore Sun wrote that the album "follows a more twisted path" than Once Upon a Time, chronicling "the band from cult-level acclaim to something resembling pop accessibility." Considine added that "the most amazing thing about this progression is how little the group alters its approach along the way."

A review of the album in The Advocate notes that the compilation demonstrates that the band that had made "consistently compelling music", and highlights "the group's knack for creating smart arrangements of non-Banshees music" such as on "Dear Prudence", "This Wheel's on Fire", and "The Passenger". In a 4 out of 5 review for Select, Dave Morrison noted that after 1982, the band "produced some of their best work in this period: superbly crafted vignettes of dark-hued psychedelic melodrama."

Writing for MusicHound in 1999, Doug Pullen recommended the compilation as the first Banshees album that listeners should consider since most of their studio albums sounded dated. He said that Twice Upon a Time "at least displays a clarity of vision and conviction that runs through the group's groovy gothic-art-punk rock".

== Track listing ==
All tracks by Siouxsie and the Banshees, except 4 by Lennon–McCartney, 10 by Bob Dylan-Rick Danko, 11 by James Osterberg-Ricky Gardiner, 12 by Harry Warren-Johnny Mercer-Siouxsie and the Banshees and 18 by Siouxsie and the Banshees-Danny Elfman.

1. "Fireworks"
2. "Slowdive"
3. "Melt!"
4. "Dear Prudence"
5. "Swimming Horses"
6. "Dazzle"
7. "Overground" (re-recorded version from The Thorn EP)
8. "Cities in Dust"
9. "Candyman"
10. "This Wheel's on Fire" (7-inch edit)
11. "The Passenger" (7-inch edit)
12. "Peek-a-Boo"
13. "The Killing Jar" (single version)
14. "The Last Beat of My Heart" (live at Lollapalooza, Seattle, 28 August 1991)
15. "Kiss Them for Me" (7-inch edit)
16. "Shadowtime" (single version)
17. "Fear (of the Unknown)" (House of Fear Mix by Junior Vasquez)
18. "Face to Face"

== Charts ==
Chart (1992)	Peak position
UK Albums Chart	26
