= All Souls (album) =

Compilation album by Siouxsie and the Banshees
- Released: 21 October 2022
- Length: 37:20
- Label: Universal
- Compiler: Siouxsie Sioux

Siouxsie and the Banshees chronology
At the BBC (2009)	All Souls (2022)

All Souls is a compilation album by British rock band Siouxsie and the Banshees, released on vinyl on 21 October 2022, and on CD with an obi strip on 31 October 2025. It is a collection of singles, album tracks, and B-sides. It was conceived by Siouxsie Sioux as a seasonal compilation "to celebrate the autumn equinox and its festivities".

== Background ==
In June 2022, vocalist Siouxsie Sioux assisted in the half-speed remastering of ten Siouxsie and the Banshees tracks at Abbey Road Studios by Miles Showell. The songs were compiled into the album for "autumnal celebration".

The track listing, chosen by Siouxsie, compiles songs referencing the occult, death and autumnal festivities, such as Day of the Dead/All Souls' Day (in "El Dia De Los Muertos", originally a B-side from "The Last Beat of My Heart" single) and Halloween (originally released on Juju).

The compilation includes other lesser known album tracks and B-sides, as well as "Fireworks", "Peek-a-Boo", and "Spellbound". This last song featured in the end credits of "The Piggyback", the finale of the fourth season of Stranger Things, earlier in the year.

The cover design was directed by Siouxsie and features a marigold, a symbol of the Mexican Day of the Dead festivities. Marigolds are also mentioned in the lyrics of "El Dia De Los Muertos".

== Release ==
All Souls was released on black vinyl, and limited orange vinyl, North American pressings were made in Canada while European copies were pressed in the Netherlands. All Souls was also released on streaming platforms. It was released on CD in a limited edition (3000 copies) with an obi on 31 October 2025.

== Critical reception ==
Professional ratings
Review scores
Source	Rating
Mojo	4/5 stars

Pat Gilbert from Mojo gave the album four stars out of five, calling the track selection "an uneven 10-track mix of hits, LP tracks and B-sides that don't so much make you feel especially spooked as marvel at the Banshees' many nuanced evolutions".

Spin wrote that "All Souls is a balance of hits and rarities that fans can enjoy all year" and that the album was "a great gift for both longtime Siouxsie fans and those of you who are just catching on to her about hearing 'Spellbound' in the fourth season of Stranger Things".

== Track listing ==
All lyrics are written by Siouxsie Sioux, except where noted.

All Souls track listing
No.	Title	Lyrics	Music	Length
1.	"Fireworks" (12" version; stand-alone single)	Steven Severin	Siouxsie, Severin, Budgie, John McGeoch	4:32
2.	"Halloween" (from Juju)	Severin	Siouxsie, Severin, Budgie, McGeoch	3:42
3.	"Supernatural Thing" (Ben E. King cover; B-side of "Arabian Knights")	Patrick Grant, Gwen Guthrie	Grant, Guthrie	4:24
4.	"El Dia De Los Muertos" (B-side of "The Last Beat of My Heart")		Siouxsie, Severin, Budgie	3:34
5.	"The Sweetest Chill" (from Tinderbox)		Siouxsie, Severin, Budgie	4:12
6.	"Spellbound" (from Juju)	Severin	Siouxsie, Severin, Budgie, McGeoch	3:17
7.	"Something Wicked (This Way Comes)" (B-side of "The Killing Jar")		Siouxsie, Severin, Budgie	4:22
8.	"Rawhead and Bloodybones" (from Peepshow)		Siouxsie, Severin, Budgie	2:31
9.	"We Hunger" (from Hyæna)		Siouxsie, Severin, Budgie, Robert Smith	3:31
10.	"Peek-a-Boo" (from Peepshow)		Siouxsie, Severin, Budgie, Harry Warren, Johnny Mercer	3:11
Total length:				37:20

== Charts ==
Chart performance for All Souls
Chart (2022)	Peak position
Belgian Albums (Ultratop Flanders)	114
Scottish Albums (Official Charts)	19
