= Once Upon a Time/The Singles =

Greatest hits album by Siouxsie and the Banshees
- Released: 4 December 1981
- Recorded: 1978–1981
- Genre: Post-punk
- Length: 32:37
- Label: Polydor (UK); PVC (original US release); Geffen (1984 US reissue)
- Producer: Siouxsie and the Banshees; Nigel Gray; Steve Lillywhite; Nils Stevenson; Mike Stavrou

Siouxsie and the Banshees compilations chronology
Once Upon a Time/The Singles (1981)	Twice Upon a Time – The Singles (1992)

Once Upon a Time/The Singles is a 1981 compilation album by Siouxsie and the Banshees featuring the band's UK single releases to that date. The album included several songs that had been released as singles yet had not appeared on any of the Banshees' four albums (but also with "Mirage", an album-only song from The Scream to fill up the first LP side). Once Upon a Time/The Singles spent twenty six weeks in the UK albums chart. The sleeve was designed by Stylorouge.

== Video compilation ==
A tie-in VHS video was released in the UK the same year on PolyGram's Spectrum label. Running for 30 minutes, it featured the videos to the eight singles, but replaced "Mirage" and "Love in a Void" with "Red Light".

== Critical reception ==
Professional ratings
Review scores
Source	Rating
AllMusic	4.5/5 stars
The Rolling Stone Album Guide	4/5 stars
The Village Voice	B+

AllMusic's Steve Huey called the compilation "a cohesive and essential overview of the band's edgy, influential peak". He added that despite the group's "challenging" music, "it's also accessible enough for eight of these singles to have charted in the British Top 50." In 1982, Mark Tremblay of the Calgary Herald wrote that "only 'Playground Twist' really excels from the first side", which features the band's singles prior to 1980. Tremblay said "Side two is more polished, less abrasive and generally has better rhythmic drive." In 2002, Q Magazine named Once Upon a Time/The Singles the 7th Greatest Album of All-Time by a Female Artist. In 2012, Rolling Stone ranked the album 44th on its "Women Who Rock: The 50 Greatest Albums of All Time" list.

== Track listing ==
1. "Hong Kong Garden" (Siouxsie Sioux, Steven Severin, John McKay and Kenny Morris)
2. "Mirage" (Siouxsie, Severin, McKay and Morris)
3. "The Staircase (Mystery)" (Siouxsie, Severin, McKay and Morris)
4. "Playground Twist" (Siouxsie, Severin, McKay and Morris)
5. "Love in a Void" (Siouxsie, Severin, Peter Fenton and Morris)
6. "Happy House" (Siouxsie and Severin)
7. "Christine" (Siouxsie and Severin)
8. "Israel" (Siouxsie, Severin, Budgie and John McGeoch)
9. "Spellbound" (Siouxsie, Severin, Budgie and McGeoch)
10. "Arabian Knights" (Siouxsie, Severin, Budgie and McGeoch)

== Charts ==
Chart performance for Once Upon a Time/The Singles
Chart (1982–1983)	Peak position
New Zealand Albums (RMNZ)	16
UK Albums (OCC)	21

== Certifications ==
Certifications for Once Upon a Time: The Singles
Region	Certification	Certified units/sales
United Kingdom (BPI)	Gold	100,000^{^}
^{^} Shipments figures based on certification alone.
