= Slow Dance (Jeremy Jay album) =

Studio album by Jeremy Jay
- Released: 2009
- Recorded: 24 March 2009
- Genre: Indie pop
- Label: K Records

Jeremy Jay chronology
A Place Where We Could Go (2008)	Slow Dance (2009)	Splash (2010)

Singles from Slow Dance
- 1. "We Were There" Released: 2009; 2. "Breaking the Ice" Released: 2009

Professional ratings
Review scores
Source	Rating
Allmusic	3.5/5 stars
The Fader	favourable
Les Inrockuptibles	favourable
Pitchfork Media	(7.7/10)
Spin	Very favourable
Tiny Mix Tapes	Very favourable

Slow Dance is the second album by Jeremy Jay, released by K Records.

The album received critical acclaim. In its review, Pitchfork wrote that Jay played a "garage-rock and frigid post-punk as a backdrop for romanticized pop fantasy". Critic Marc Hogan described the song "In this Lonely Town" as a "vivid scene" of a film. Spin hailed the album, saying "his quietly unsettling aura perfectly suits" the songs. Tiny Mix Tapes praised Slow Dance and wrote : "This is one of the smartest indie-pop albums in recent years". Les Inrockuptibles also praised the album.

The album was released on vinyl and CD. Two singles were taken from Slow Dance: "We Were There" and "Breaking the Ice". "We Were There" was first released on vinyl 7" inch with the B-side "Beautiful Dreamer". "Breaking the Ice" was then released on 7" inch vinyl with two extra tracks, "Winter Wonder" and "Words of Love".

== Track listing ==
1. We Were There
2. In This Lonely Town
3. Gallop
4. Canter Canter
5. Slow Dance
6. Winter Wonder
7. Will You Dance with Me?
8. Breaking the Ice
9. Slow Dance 2
10. Where Could We Go Tonight?

== Personnel ==
- Derek James – bass
- Jeremy Jay – synthesizer, guitar, piano, vocals, producer
- Ilya Malinsky – guitar, synth, drums
- Nick Pahl – drums
