= The Rapture (album) =

1995 studio album by Siouxsie and the Banshees

Studio album by Siouxsie and the Banshees
- Released: 16 January 1995
- Recorded: May 1993 and May 1994
- Studios: Studio du Manoir (Léon, France) and Wessex (London)
- Genres: Alternative rock; pop rock; art rock
- Length: 54:13
- Labels: Polydor; Geffen (US and Canada)
- Producers: Siouxsie and the Banshees; John Cale

Siouxsie and the Banshees chronology
Superstition (1991)	The Rapture (1995)	Downside Up (2004)

2023 Re-Release Vinyl Cover
- The vinyl reissue in 2023

Siouxsie Sioux chronology
Superstition (1991)	The Rapture (1995)	Anima Animus; The Creatures (1999)

Singles from The Rapture
- 1. "O Baby" Released: 28 December 1994; 2. "Stargazer" Released: 6 February 1995

The Rapture is the eleventh and final studio album by the British rock band Siouxsie and the Banshees. It was released on 16 January 1995 in the United Kingdom and on 14 February 1995 in the United States. The album was recorded in two block sessions. The songs with cello arrangements, including the title track as well as "Fall from Grace" and "Not Forgotten", were produced by the band in 1993, and John Cale produced the remaining songs in mid-1994.

In 2023, the album was reissued on double LP blue vinyl.

== Recording ==
After composing songs in Siouxsie Sioux and Budgie's house in Condom, France, in March and April 1993, the band went to Léon near Biarritz. They produced the first part of the album at Studio du Manoir in May. "The Double Life" was the last song that they recorded during that first block session. When Siouxsie heard the news that guitarist Mick Ronson had died, she asked Jon Klein to add a guitar solo on "The Double Life", in memory of Ronson, whereas the band usually didn't want solos.

In May 1994, they recorded the final songs in London, this time with producer and former Velvet Underground member John Cale, who had previously produced albums that the band liked such as Patti Smith's Horses and the first Modern Lovers album. Cale also mixed one track, "Fall from Grace", from the previous recording session.

== Release ==
In the UK, Polydor only released the album on both CD and cassette, whereas in the US, Geffen also released it on vinyl LP.

The album was remastered for CD in 2014 with three bonus tracks, including a previously unreleased song called "FGM", and "New Skin", a song recorded for the Showgirls soundtrack of the Paul Verhoeven film of the same name. "New Skin" has a slightly different mix and is longer than on the original Showgirls album. From then and on all further reissues, "Stargazer" has a different mix: the Mark Saunders mix was included instead of the original mix initially made by the band.

A double vinyl reissue of the album, half-speed mastered from the original ¼” tapes by Miles Showell at Abbey Road Studios, was released in December 2018.

In October 2023, The Rapture was reissued on double translucent turquoise vinyl.

== Critical reception ==
Professional ratings
Review scores
Source	Rating
AllMusic	4/5 stars
Select	4/5
Vox	7/10

Melody Maker wrote: "The Rapture is a fascinating, transcontinental journey through danger and exotica". Describing the arrangements, they added, "it's a vivid cornucopia of lush instrumentation, mandolins vying with cellos and bells, sweeping strings describing starlit oceans and sirens calling from jagged rocks, and attics that hide secret worlds". Steve Malins of Vox also liked the album. He said, "The title-track is a sublime melodrama recalling the experimentation of Peepshow and 1982's Kiss in the Dreamhouse", before concluding with this sentence, "The Rapture represents an intelligent twist on familiar Banshees obsessions". Liz Buckley of Sun Zoom Spark also praised it, writing, "How is a band that first formed almost two decades ago able to remain both vital and celebrated? Answer: Metamorphosis". Buckley also declared that "the album is able to excite the hairs on the back of your neck". Select gave it a rating of four out of five, hailing the band as "purveyors of scary pop par excellence". Matt Hall noted the ability of the group for "trotting out jolly tunes about mental breakdown, love bordering on obsession and severely dislocated relationships." The reviewer characterised The Rapture as a "fine little Russian doll of a record", and said, "Under the keyboard lines, swelling strings and OTT percussion, at the centre of every song is a nugget of disquiet that keeps you listening again and again." Writing in the 2004 edition of The Rolling Stone Album Guide, Mark Coleman and Mac Randall described The Rapture as "a lackluster affair". AllMusic retrospectively rated the album four out of five stars, saying: "The surprise is that it's a career highpoint" as "Siouxsie, Severin and Budgie rediscovered their chemistry". Reviewer Alex Ogg noted that "Despite nods to the band's past in the savage "Not Forgotten," the real gems are the sunny-side-up "O, Baby" (when did Siouxsie ever sound so genuinely happy?) and an 11-minute title-track that is as dazzling as anything they have ever performed." Ogg concluded: it is "a classic case of leaving the scene on a high note".

Andrew Weatherall included the track "The Double Life" in a two-hour mix he did and presented for BBC Radio 6 in April 2011.

== Track listing ==
All tracks produced by Siouxsie and the Banshees except tracks 1-2 and 7-8-9 produced by John Cale. Track 4 produced by Siouxsie and the Banshees and mixed by John Cale.

All music composed by Siouxsie and the Banshees, except bonus tracks "FGM" by Siouxsie Sioux/Jon Klein and "New Skin" by Siouxsie.

All lyrics are written by Siouxsie, except where noted.

No.	Title	Lyrics	Length
1.	"O Baby"		3:19
2.	"Tearing Apart"		3:21
3.	"Stargazer"		3:14
4.	"Fall from Grace"	Severin	3:43
5.	"Not Forgotten"		4:44
6.	"Sick Child"	Budgie	4:49
7.	"The Lonely One"		3:29
8.	"Falling Down"		2:53
9.	"Forever"		4:04
10.	"The Rapture"		11:30
11.	"The Double Life"	Severin	4:10
12.	"Love Out Me"		4:43

2014 CD remastered reissue bonus tracks
No.	Title	Length
13.	"O Baby" (Manhattan mix)	3:27
14.	"FGM" (Unreleased demo)	3:05
15.	"New Skin" (Unreleased Showgirls long version)	8:06

== Personnel ==
Siouxsie and the Banshees

- Siouxsie Sioux - vocals
- Steven Severin - electric bass and [uncredited] backing vocals on "The Lonely One"
- Budgie - drums and percussion
- Martin McCarrick - cello, keyboards and accordion
- Jon Klein – guitars

Additional personnel

- Renaud Pion - woodwind
- John Cale - producer and mixer
- Martin Brass - engineer
- Charlie Gray - engineer
- Knox Chandler - guitar on "New Skin"
- Gary Barnacle, Peter Thoms, Luke Tunney and John Thirkell [uncredited] - brass section on "New Skin"

== Charts ==
Chart performance for The Rapture
Chart (1995)	Peak position
Canada Top Albums/CDs (RPM)	66
Scottish Albums (Official Charts)	44
UK Albums (Official Charts)	33
US Billboard 200	127
