= A Place Where We Could Go =

Studio album by Jeremy Jay
- Released: 20 May 2008
- Genre: Indie pop
- Label: K Records

Jeremy Jay chronology
| Airwalker (2007) | A Place Where We Could Go (2008) | Slow Dance (2009) |

Professional ratings
Review scores
| Source | Rating |
|---|---|
| Allmusic | 4/5 stars |
| Pitchfork Media | (7.6/10) |

A Place Where We Could Go is the first album by Jeremy Jay, released by K Records. It was produced by K founder and former Beat Happening frontman Calvin Johnson. It was well received by Pitchfork. In his review, Marc Hogan compared him to David Bowie. Hogan also mentioned that Jay's spoken-sung vocals, recalled the solo work of Jonathan Richman, with a certain punk sensibility.

The album was released on vinyl and CD.

== Track listing ==
All tracks by Jeremy Jay

1. "Nite Nite" – 0:06
2. "Heavenly Creatures" – 4:10
3. "Beautiful Rebel" – 2:33
4. "The Living Dolls" – 2:54
5. "Escape to Aspen" – 2:19
6. "Till We Meet Again" – 2:40
7. "A Place Where We Could Go" – 2:43
8. "While the City Sleeps" – 3:08
9. "Hold Me in Your Arms Tonite" – 2:43
10. "Someone Cares" – 2:42

== Personnel ==
- Larissa James – photography
- Jeremy Jay – guitar, piano, vocals, producer
- Calvin Johnson – producer, engineer, mixing
- Chris Sutton – drums
- Nick Zwart – assistant engineer
