= Splash (Jeremy Jay album) =

Studio album by Jeremy Jay
- Released: 7 June 2010
- Genre: Indie pop
- Label: K Records

Jeremy Jay chronology
Slow Dance (2009)	Splash (2010)	Dream Diary (2011)

Singles from Splash
- 1. "Just Dial My Number" Released: 2010

Professional ratings
Review scores
Source	Rating
Allmusic	3.5/5 stars
NME	favourable
Pitchfork Media	(6.3/10)

Splash is the third album by Jeremy Jay, released by K Records. It was recorded during the summer of 2009 in London at Fortress Studio after six weeks of touring.

The album was released on vinyl and CD via the K Records website. "Just Dial My Number" was released on vinyl 7" inch 45 RPM.

== Track listing ==
All tracks by Jeremy Jay

1. As You Look Over The City
2. Just Dial My Number
3. Splash
4. It Happened Before Our Time
5. A Sliver Of A Chance
6. Something To Remember You By
7. This Is Our Time
8. Someday Somewhere
9. Why Is This Feeling So Wrong?

== Personnel ==
- Jeremy Jay – guitar, piano, vocals, producer
- Jet Marshall - guitar
- Tony Harewood - Bass
- Jacob Grace – Drums
