= Abandoned Apartments =

Studio album by Jeremy Jay
- Released: 21 January 2014
- Genre: Indie pop
- Label: K Records

Jeremy Jay chronology
Dream Diary (2011)	Abandoned Apartments (2014)

Singles from Abandoned Apartments
- 1. "Covered in Ivy b/w Situations Said" Released: 20 August 2013; 2. "Sentimental Expressway b/w Later That Night" Released: 1 October 2013

Professional ratings
Aggregate scores
Source	Rating
Metacritic	69/100
Review scores
Source	Rating
Allmusic	4/5 stars
Pitchfork Media	(5.5/10)
Tiny Mix Tapes	4/5 stars

Abandoned Apartments is the fifth album by Jeremy Jay, released by K Records. It was recorded over a long period of self-produced sessions. The album was released on vinyl and on CD.

"Graveyard Shift", the first track taken from the album, was described by Pitchfork as "comfortable [with] warm, long hypnotic stretches.

Two singles, each including an extra track, were taken from the album. "Covered in Ivy" b/w "Situations Said" was released on digital download in August 2013, followed a few months later by "Sentimental Expressway" b/w "Later that Night", also released on digital download.

== Track listing ==
All tracks by Jeremy Jay

1. Sentimental Expressway
2. Covered In Ivy
3. Graveyard Shift
4. The View From The Train Window
5. Red Primary Afternoon
6. Far & Near
7. When I Met You
8. Abandoned Apartments
9. You Said It Was Forever
10. I Was Waiting

== Personnel ==
- Jeremy Jay - guitar, piano, vocals, producer
- Jet Marshall - guitar
- Tony Harewood - bass
- Jacob Grace - drums
- Nick Pahl - bass
