= Dream Diary (album) =

Studio album by Jeremy Jay
- Released: 30 April 2011
- Genre: Indie pop
- Label: K Records

Jeremy Jay chronology
Splash (2009)	Dream Diary (2011)	Abandoned Apartments (2014)

Professional ratings
Review scores
Source	Rating
Pitchfork Media	(7.6/10)
Tiny Mix Tapes	4/5 marks

Dream Diary is the fourth album by Jeremy Jay, released by K Records. It was recorded at Stagg Street Studios in Los Angeles.

The album was well received by the critics. Pitchfork Media stated: "It appears to be the purest distillation of what Jay set out to do on day one". Tiny Mix Tapes hailed Dream Diary, saying : "Like Scott Walker in his early solo period, Jay is making accomplished and deeply interesting contemporary pop music while teasing the listener with seductive unfolding visions.

Dream Diary was released on vinyl and CD.

== Track listing ==
All tracks by Jeremy Jay

1. Out on the Highway
2. Caught in a Whirl
3. By the River's Edge
4. Secret Sounds
5. In the Times
6. Shayla
7. The Days of Casting Clouds Away
8. It's Just a Walk in the Park
9. Our Only Light's a Flashlight
10. Whispers of the Heart
11. The Dream Diary Kids
12. Wild Orchids
13. The Man on the Mountain

== Personnel ==
- Jeremy Jay – guitar, keyboards, vocals, producer
- Derek - Bass
- Michael – Drums
