= Fear (of the Unknown) =

Single by Siouxsie and the Banshees

from the album Superstition
- B-side: "Spiral Twist"; "I Could Be Again"
- Released: 26 November 1991
- Recorded: 1991
- Genre: Dance-rock, alternative rock
- Length: 4:10
- Label: Geffen
- Songwriters: Susan Ballion, Peter Edward Clarke and Steven Severin
- Producer: Stephen Hague

Siouxsie and the Banshees singles chronology
"Shadowtime" (1991)	"Fear (of the Unknown)" (1991)	"Face to Face" (1992)

Music video
- "Fear (of the Unknown)" on YouTube

"Fear (of the Unknown)" is a song written and recorded by English rock band Siouxsie and the Banshees and produced by Stephen Hague. It was a U.S. only single released in late 1991 as the second single from the band's 10th studio album, Superstition. It did not get any domestic release in the UK and was the only Siouxsie and the Banshees single not to be issued in their home country.

The track, in its original form, was an uptempo dance-oriented number with heavy percussion work by Banshees drummer Budgie. For its release as a single, "Fear (of the Unknown)" was drastically remixed by Junior Vasquez to accentuate its 4/4 rhythm and give it a house music feel. A 12-inch was released with several remixes. When included on the 1992 compilation album Twice Upon a Time – The Singles, the track listing featured the "House of Fear Mix", the one which had been used for the promo video.

The cover art is an homage to James Stewart's dream sequence in Alfred Hitchcock's film Vertigo. The promotional video was also an ode to the movie Vertigo with a scene referring to the sequence with the free fall. Two videos were released: one with the "House of Fear mix" and another one longer using the "House of Fear extended mix".

The song became the Banshees' biggest hit on the US Billboard magazine's Hot Dance/Disco chart, climbing to number 6, as it was heavily played by many DJs. "Fear (of the Unknown)" received moderate airplay on American alternative rock radio, peaking at number 12 on Billboard's Modern Rock Tracks chart.

== Track listing ==
=== 12″ vinyl ===
1. "Fear (of the Unknown)" (CHR Mix) *
2. "Fear (of the Unknown)" (House of Fear Extended Mix) *
3. "Fear (of the Unknown)" (LP Version)
4. "Fear (of the Unknown)" (Vertigo Mix) *
5. "Fear (of the Unknown)" (Urban Fear Mix) *
6. "Spiral Twist"

(* remixed by Junior Vasquez)

=== CD ===
1. "Fear (of the Unknown)" (LP Version)
2. "Spiral Twist"
3. "I Could Be Again"
4. "Fear (of the Unknown)" (Vertigo mix)

== Charts ==
Chart (1991)	Peak position
US Modern Rock Tracks	12
US Hot Dance/Disco	6
