= Interlude (Timi Yuro song) =

Single by Morrissey and Siouxsie
- Released: 8 August 1994
- Genre: Chamber pop
- Length: 3:49
- Label: Parlophone (UK)
- Songwriters: Georges Delerue; Hal Shaper
- Producer: Boz Boorer

Morrissey singles chronology
"Hold On to Your Friends" (1994)	"Interlude" (1994)	"Now My Heart Is Full" (1994)

Siouxsie singles chronology
"Face to Face" (1992)	"Interlude" (1994)	"O Baby" (1994)

Audio sample
- file; help

"Interlude" is a 1968 song written and composed by Georges Delerue and Hal Shaper and originally performed by American soul singer Timi Yuro. It is the title track for the 1968 film of the same name. In 1994, the song was covered in a duet by English singers Morrissey and Siouxsie Sioux and released as a single in August of that year by EMI. It was presented under the banner of "Morrissey & Siouxsie".

== Morrissey and Siouxsie version ==
=== Background and release ===
Morrissey first contacted Siouxsie in the early 1990s with a view to recording a duet with her. In early 1993, he sent her a tape with some potential songs he had selected. All were numbers initially sung by female singers like Nancy Sinatra and Dionne Warwick, (except Jobriath). Siouxsie picked this ballad and Morrissey agreed.

Melody Maker published a news item in May 1993, announcing that Morrissey and Siouxsie were "holding discussions at the moment, with a view to recording a duet to release as a single".

"Interlude" was recorded during a week-end off the recording sessions for Morrissey's Vauxhall and I album in July 1993 at Hook End Manor, and was produced by Morrissey guitarist and musical director Boz Boorer. The sessions went well and Boorer later described his collaboration with Siouxsie as "complete joy". String arrangement was hand written and conducted by Boorer. The strings section was played by a quartet made with members of My Life Story. Morrissey and Siouxsie each recorded a solo version of the entire track and the final result with their two voices together was created in the final mix from these two solo versions.

Soon after the recording, however, the two singers fell out with one another regarding the content of the video. Ultimately, the video shoot never took place and the whole project was put on ice for a few months. EMI then threatened to not promote it without the existence of a supporting video. Although it was a "winter" song, against all expectations, EMI finally released "Interlude" in the summer of 1994. In North America, due to the impossibility of an agreement between Sire (Morrissey's US record company) and Geffen (Siouxsie's), the record was only available on import in very limited quantities.

The song peaked at No. 25 on the UK Singles Chart in August 1994.

"Interlude" was later included on a compilation called Suedehead: The Best of Morrissey (1997). A previously unreleased version of the song, featuring only Morrissey's vocals, appeared on his 2011 Very Best Of compilation. Siouxsie's vocals only version has never been commercially released.

=== Sleeve ===
The single's sleeve is a cropped version of the photograph Girl Jiving in Southam St. by Roger Mayne, the model being Eileen Sheekey. Morrissey conceived the sleeve of the record and chose that photograph by Mayne. Mayne used to visit London's most humble streets on weekends and one of them was Southam Street. He visited 27 times taking a total of 1400 photos between the years 1956 to 1961. Eileen Sheekey was one of 11 daughters and one boy from the Sheekey family. Mayne took two pictures of Eileen while she was dancing; someone on the street had put on a song; she didn't like the first photo but the second photo she did like. Mayne himself said it is one of his favourite photos.

=== Critical reception ===
The single was retrospectively well received by MacKenzie Wilson of AllMusic, who considered the performers to be "one of the finest duos in modern rock." The track's production was also praised: "The flowing string arrangements on "Interlude" are breathtaking, and appropriate to the talents of both artists." Spin also praised the collaboration, saying : "Two heroes enterwine their voices - Siouxsie's torchily rich, Morrissey's expansively wobbly - for a song about romance that actually doesn't sound doomed".

This collaboration was included in Spin magazine's list of the top 10 "one-off team-ups" of all time.

=== Track listings ===
7" vinyl and cassette

1. "Interlude" (Georges Delerue / Hal Shaper)
2. "Interlude (Extended)"

12" vinyl and CD

1. "Interlude"
2. "Interlude (Extended)"
3. "Interlude (Instrumental)"

Country	Record label	Format	Catalogue number
UK	Parlophone	7" vinyl	R6365
UK	Parlophone	12" vinyl	12R6365
UK	Parlophone	Compact disc	CDR6365
UK	Parlophone	Cassette	TCR6365

== See also ==
- Morrissey discography
- Siouxsie and the Banshees discography
