= Superstition (Siouxsie and the Banshees album) =

1991 studio album by Siouxsie and the Banshees

Studio album by Siouxsie and the Banshees
- Released: 10 June 1991
- Recorded: December 1990 – April 1991
- Studio: RAK, London
- Genre: Alternative rock; art pop
- Length: 48:21
- Label: Polydor; Geffen (US)
- Producer: Stephen Hague

Siouxsie and the Banshees chronology
Peepshow (1988)	Superstition (1991)	The Rapture (1995)

Siouxsie Sioux chronology
Boomerang the Creatures (1989)	Superstition (1991)	The Rapture (1995)

Singles from Superstition
- 1. "Kiss Them for Me" Released: 13 May 1991; 2. "Shadowtime" Released: 1 July 1991; 3. "Fear (of the Unknown)" Released: 26 November 1991

Superstition is the tenth studio album by the English rock band Siouxsie and the Banshees, released on 10 June 1991 by Polydor Records. The lead single, "Kiss Them for Me", gave the band their first top 40 Billboard Hot 100 entry in the United States, peaking at No. 23, with the album peaking at No. 65 on the Billboard 200 chart. The band widened their musical influences with the arrival of musician Talvin Singh, who played tablas on the songs "Kiss Them for Me" and "Silver Waterfalls".

== Background and promotion ==
The band wrote the songs in a residential studio in Wales. The album was then recorded with producer Stephen Hague in London at RAK Studios. Hague used techniques that Siouxsie Sioux did not approve of later, such as computer-based production. She stated: "There are still songs I like on it, like 'Kiss Them for Me' and 'Drifter', but we were trying a different kind of working style, a different kind of discipline, during which I really built a strong case against computers." Steven Severin had a different perspective as he liked Hague's way of working, which was "all about honing and honing until you have something great".

In 1991, the band spent two months on the road, from July until August, in the United States as second headliners of the inaugural Lollapalooza tour. The last date took place in Seattle on 31 August. Two weeks later, the album reached its highest position at number 65 in the Billboard 200 for the week of 14 September; it spent 21 weeks total on that chart. It remained their best selling album in the US, with 358,000 sold copies as of 2004, according to Nielsen SoundScan.

== Release ==
Superstition was reissued in a remastered CD version with bonus tracks in October 2014. A 180 gram double-vinyl reissue of the original edition was half-speed mastered by Miles Showell at Abbey Road Studios and released in September 2018.

== Critical reception ==
Professional ratings
Review scores
Source	Rating
AllMusic	3/5 stars
Melody Maker	very favourable
Q	4/5 stars
Select	4/5

Upon release, Q rated the album four out of five stars, saying: "They pop it up with sweet string textures on the single 'Kiss Them for Me', bear down on the maritime metaphor of 'Drifter' with doomy foghorn and bells effects, give it the all but Twin Peaks dreamscape for 'Softly'." Melody Maker described "Kiss Them for Me" as "gorgeous, wicked and glamorous." In the same paper, reviewer Jon Wilde described Superstition as "a giant record about obsession, phobia, perspective and emotional tyranny." Wilde said that the song "The Ghost in You" was "a furiously pretty six note refrain that haunts long after the needle has returned to safety." In a four out of five review, Select said that "Kiss Them for Me" was a "passionately laidback" single, "exotic" and "funky", with "an underlying hush of electro pulsebeat" making it dancefloor friendly. In the same review, "Drifter" was compared to the soundtrack of a Sergio Leone film with a touch of "ethereal sensuality", and "Silver Waterfalls" was qualified as "gorgeous". The reviewer commented that the album ends with the "delicate" "Softly", with lyrics bare and tender enough to be almost like Scott Walker. Glyn Brown concluded: [It is] "ambitious".

Writing in the 2004 edition of The Rolling Stone Album Guide, Mark Coleman and Mac Randall said that Superstition shares Peepshow's integration of "synthesizers and a lighter pop touch with the Banshees' trademark howl." Unlike its predecessor, however, they added that the album benefits from the inclusion of a "great single", as "'Kiss Them for Me' weaves a bewitching electronic stitch through Siouxsie's familiar cloth."

== Legacy ==
St. Vincent selected "Kiss Them for Me" in the episode 32 of her own radio show Mixtape Delivery Service, on Beats 1 Radio Apple Music. Karin Dreijer of the Knife included and presented "Kiss Them for Me" in a 60-minute program they produced for Sveriges Radio in 2004. Dave Sitek of TV on the Radio was inspired by the song "Kiss Them for Me". Sitek stated: "I've always tried to make a song that begins like 'Kiss Them for Me'. I think songs like 'I Was a Lover' or 'Wash the Day Away' came from that element of surprise mode where all of a sudden this giant drum comes in and you're like, what the fuck?! That record was the first one where I was like, okay, even my friends're going to fall for this. I feel like that transition into that record was a relief for me. Really beautiful music was always considered too weird by the normal kids and that was the first example where I thought, we've got them, they're hooked! I watched people dance to that song, people who had never heard of any of the music that I listened to, they heard that music in a club and went crazy." Girlpool included "Kiss Them for Me" in a playlist they did for The Fader magazine titled "Fantasie", among songs that "transcend time".

== Track listing ==
All music composed by Siouxsie and the Banshees.

All lyrics are written by Siouxsie Sioux, except where noted.

Side one
No.	Title	Lyrics	Length
1.	"Kiss Them for Me"		4:37
2.	"Fear (of the Unknown)"		4:10
3.	"Cry"		3:33
4.	"Drifter"		4:43
5.	"Little Sister"	Steven Severin	3:21
6.	"Shadowtime"	Severin	4:28

Side two
No.	Title	Lyrics	Length
7.	"Silly Thing"		4:41
8.	"Got to Get Up"		3:17
9.	"Silver Waterfalls"	Budgie	4:24
10.	"Softly"		6:00
11.	"The Ghost in You"	Severin	5:01

2014 CD remastered reissue bonus tracks
No.	Title	Length
12.	"Face to Face"	4:25
13.	"Kiss Them for Me (Snapper Mix)"	6:24
14.	"Kiss Them for Me (Kathak #1 Mix)"	8:55

== Personnel ==
Siouxsie and the Banshees

- Siouxsie Sioux – vocals
- Steven Severin – bass and keyboards
- Budgie – drums, percussions and keyboards
- Martin McCarrick – keyboards, cello and dulcimer
- Jon Klein – guitars

Additional personnel

- Talvin Singh – percussion, tabla, tavil
- Stephen Hague – producer
- Mike "Spike" Drake – engineer
- Nigel Godrich – assistant engineer
- Abdul Kroz-Dressah – assistant engineer
- Will O'Sullivan – assistant engineer
- Nigel Vichi – design
- Siouxsie and the Banshees – design
- Donna Francesca – photography

== Charts ==
Chart performance for Superstition
Chart (1991)	Peak position
Australian Albums (ARIA)	55
European Albums (Music & Media)	39
UK Albums (OCC)	25
US Billboard 200	65
