= Jeremy Jay =

American singer-songwriter (born 1978)

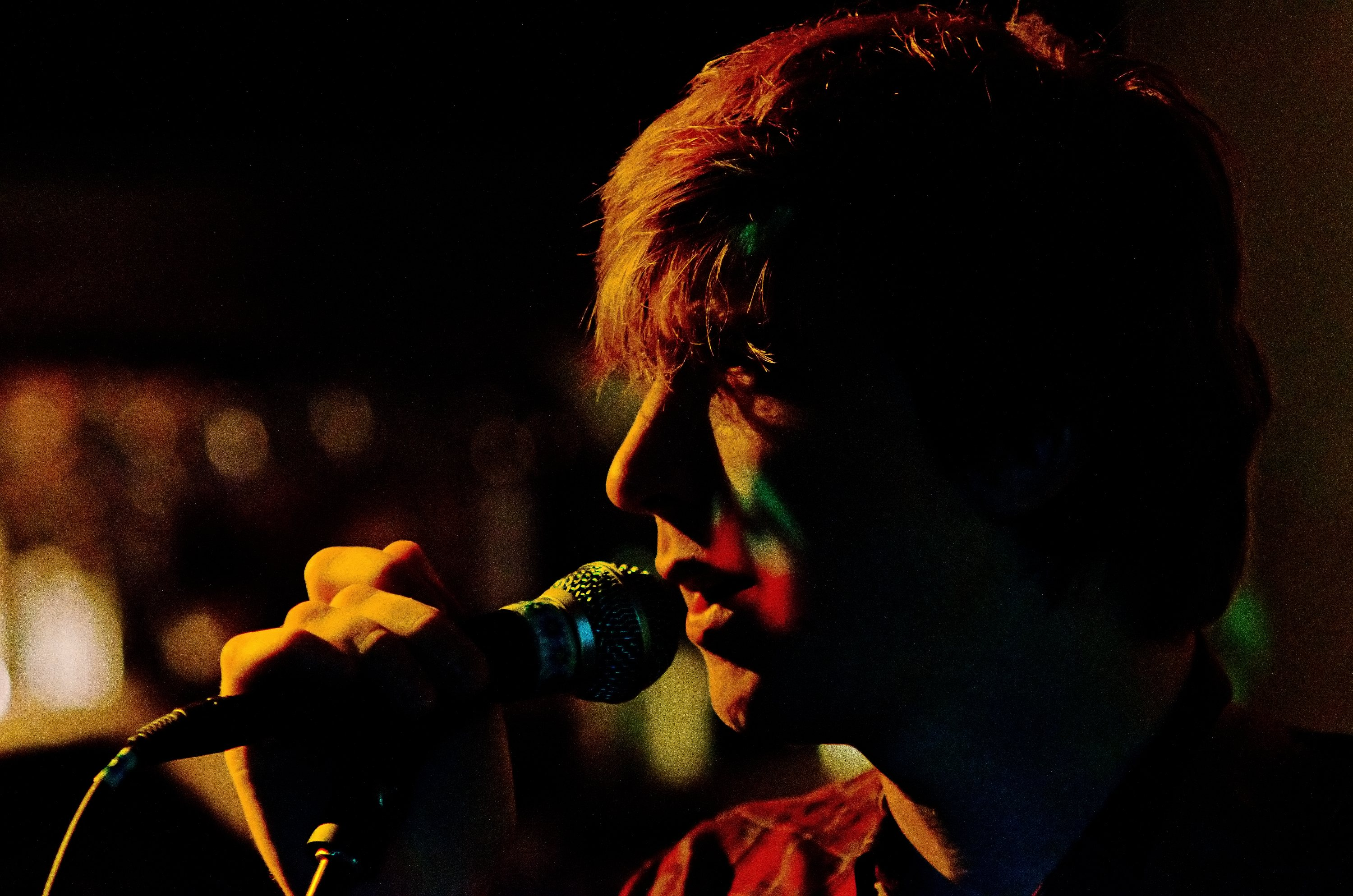
- Jeremy Jay performing live in Växjö in 2011

Background information
- Born: Jeremy Craig Shaules; January 1, 1978 (age 48); Chula Vista, California, U.S.
- Origin: Monterey, California, U.S.
- Genres: Indie pop
- Instruments: Vocals, guitar, piano
- Years active: 2007–present
- Labels: K Records; Mystery Section
- Website: Jeremy Jay official

Jeremy Craig Shaules, better known as Jeremy Jay, is an American alternative pop musician and singer-songwriter. He has released five studio albums, including his debut album A Place Where We Could Go in 2008 and Slow Dance in 2009.

== History ==
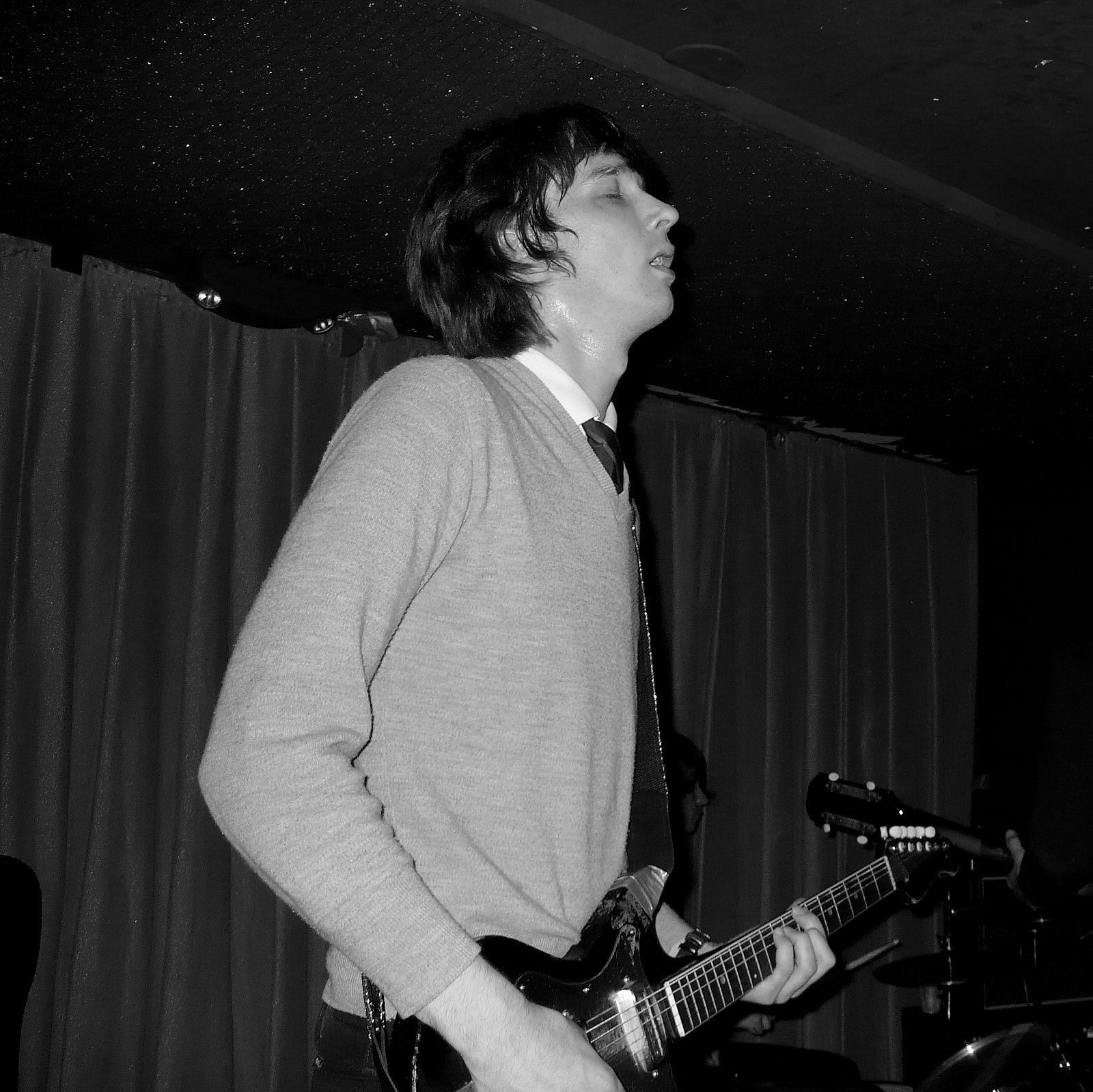
Jeremy Jay live at Edinburgh Castle, San Francisco 2007

Jay was born in Chula Vista, California on January 1, 1978, and moved to Harbor City, Los Angeles. Jeremy spoke only French with his American father until he was 13. When he was in the second grade, his father moved the family to Monterey, California where Jay lived until he was 18. In the sixth grade, his aunt gave him the sheet music for "La Bamba." He taught himself how to play the music on a school guitar where he was playing trumpet in the band. In 8th grade, he set up a recording studio in his garage to create music using a two track recorder. At the same time, he began writing his own music. At age 18 he moved to Portland, Oregon where he lived for four years and worked as a theater projectionist. In 2001, at age 23 he met Calvin Johnson, a musician, producer and founder of K Records. Johnson was interested Jay's self-produced maxi single, "Dreamland," only containing instrumental pieces. Jay moved to Los Angeles in 2005 and moved to Paris in 2009 with a record deal from the label Differant.

His first release on K Records, the Airwalker EP, appeared in 2007. It included a cover of the Siouxsie and the Banshees song "Lunar Camel" and a version of Blondie's "Angels on the Balcony". The EP was described by Pitchfork as a "cryptic, compelling short" with "half-crooned, half-spoken vocals into a bed of interlocking guitars, rigid beats, and analogue synths, creating an air of mystery out of disconnected images."

Jay's first full-length, A Place Where We Could Go, followed in 2008. It was recorded in Olympia, Washington at Dub Narcotic studios. Allmusic described his singing as a mix of Gene Vincent, Buddy Holly, Morrissey and Alan Vega.

A video for "Beautiful Rebel" directed by Austin Lovell was shot at the Griffith Park Observatory in Los Angeles. A video for "Heavenly Creatures" was directed by Bryce Kass of Daft Arts.

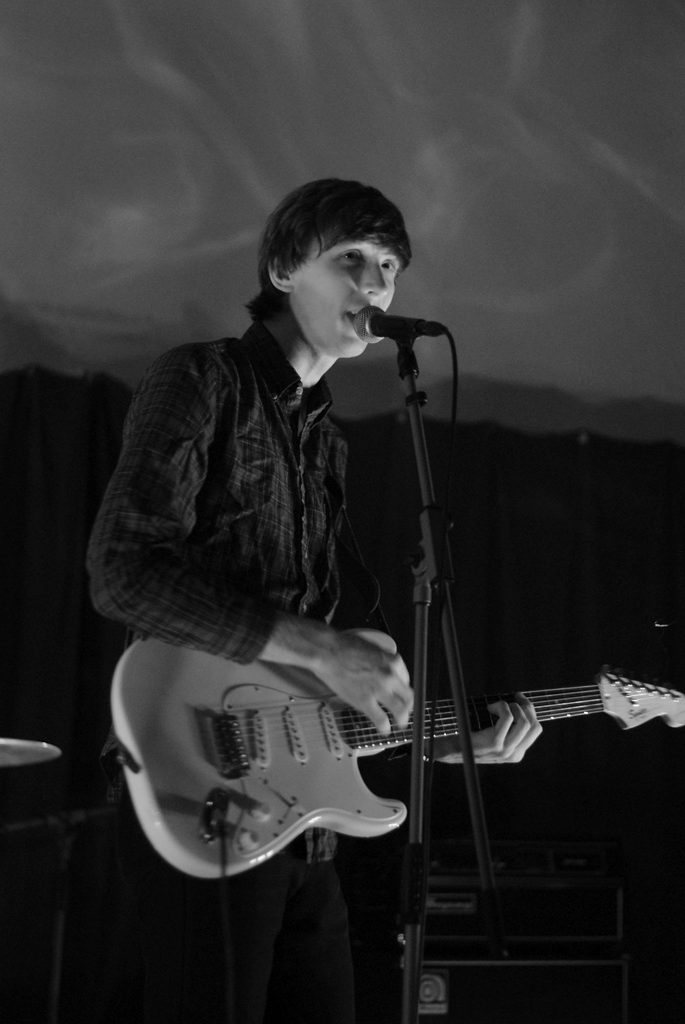
Onstage in Berlin, 2010

In 2009, Jay released Slow Dance, which was described by Pitchfork as "frail ingeniousness" with "a warm inviting space". To promote the release, he embarked on a tour throughout the year, including dates at the Primavera Festival. The Guardian wrote that Jay's "biggest asset" is songs that "appear to come unpremeditated from his heart" like Jonathan Richman. Critic James Robinson said "In a world where we've become suspicious of singer-songwriters, Jay gives us reason to keep the faith".

In 2010, Jay described his third album, Splash, as "Pavement meets Evol-era Sonic Youth played by Siouxsie Sioux." NME welcomed tracks like "As You Look over the City" and "Hologram Feather" and the "jaunty" single "Just Dial my Number". The cover image of Splash showed him at Jardin du Luxembourg in Paris. The record was released at the end of May. A tour was later cancelled due to health problems.

In the spring of 2011, Jay returned with the album Dream Diary, which was a mix of indie-pop and alt-rock. The result was compared to Scottish band Belle and Sebastian. Jay financed the album entirely on his own for the first time, to spend more time on the mixing.

In 2013, Jay composed the song "Ghost Tracks" for the soundtrack of the film Grand Central.

2014's Abandoned Apartments got a four-star review on Allmusic for its "dreamy surrealism and crisp-edged pop". Its title evokes a time when Jay was 20 years old and was looking for empty buildings in Portland to settle.

After releasing this album, Jay worked as a producer on Spanish singer Bigott's album, Pavement Tree. He then collaborated with other musicians. In November, he formed the band Dyspotian Violet with several musicians including bassist Frank Wright. They released three songs, including "The Mask", via SoundCloud.

The band then changed its name to Invisible Foxx. In March and April 2015, Jay recorded with them. In May, Invisible Foxx released their album online, Monitor Mixx, via Bandcamp:

After these collaborations, a few new tracks by Jay were released on digital download via Mystery at the end of that year.

In 2017, he performed at the Primavera Sound in Barcelona.

In May 2018, Jay released the album Demons via Spanish label "El Segell Del Primavera" : Demons featured ten tracks and was also issued on Vinyl LP.

== Discography ==
=== Albums ===
- A Place Where We Could Go (2008)
- Slow Dance (2009)
- Splash (2010)
- Dream Diary (2011)
- Abandoned Apartments (2014)
- Demons (2018)
- Dangerous Boys (2019)
- Devils Daughters (2021)

=== Singles and EPs ===
- "Dreamland" (EP), 22 May 2007
- Airwalker (EP), 2007
- "We were There" (7"), 4 September 2007
- "Love Everlasting" (vinyl, four songs), 20 January 2009
- "Breaking the Ice" (7"), 8 September 2009
- "Just Dial my Number" (7" 45 rpm on Sexbeat label), 2010
- "Into the Groove" (digital download), 11 October 2010
- "Covered in Ivy" b/w "Situations Said" (digital download), 20 August 2013
- "Sentimental Expressway" b/w "Later that Night" (digital download), 1 October 2013
- "Hallways and Splattered Paintings" b/w "Window Painted Black" (digital download), 7 August 2014
- "High Note" (digital download), 10-2-2015
- "Demons" (digital download), 7 April 2017

=== Other appearances ===
- "Prudence" (for the soundtrack of Belle Épine) (2010)
- "Ghost Tracks" (for the soundtrack of Grand Central) (2013)
