= Airwalker =

EP by Jeremy Jay
- Released: November 6, 2007
- Genre: Indie pop
- Length: 8
- Label: K Records

Jeremy Jay chronology
| Airwalker (2007) | A Place Where We Could Go (2008) |

Airwalker is the debut release by Jeremy Jay on K Records. The EP included two covers: "Lunar Camel" by Siouxsie and the Banshees and "Angels on the Balcony" by Blondie.

The 7 inch version contains two tracks while the CD version included six songs.

== Reception ==
Professional ratings
Review scores
| Source | Rating |
|---|---|
| AllMusic | 3.5/5 stars |
| Pitchfork | 7.5/10 |

AllMusic wrote, "The synth-pop bounce of the title track sounds like a vintage Orchestral Manoeuvres in the Dark single, and [Jay's] hiccuping vocals in the dramatic, piano-driven rocker 'We Stay Here' recall the likes of Mink DeVille and Suicide's Alan Vega... But the multi-instrumentalist Jay has a clever way with tuneful melodies and rich arrangements that makes Airwalker more substantial than most indie retro efforts."

== Track listing ==
1. "Lampost Scene" – 0:40
2. "Airwalker" – 3:35
3. "We Stay Here (In Our Secret World)" – 2:46
4. "Lunar Camel" – 2:11
5. "Angels on the Balcony" – 3:10
6. "Can We Disappear?" – 3:58

== Personnel ==
- Derek James – bass
- Larissa James – photography
- Jeremy Jay – synthesizer, guitar, piano, vocals, producer
- Ilya Malinsky – guitar
- Nick Pahl – drums
