= Israel (Siouxsie and the Banshees song) =

Single by Siouxsie and the Banshees
- B-side: "Red Over White"
- Released: 28 November 1980
- Recorded: 1980
- Genre: Post-punk
- Length: 4:54
- Label: Polydor
- Songwriters: Siouxsie Sioux; Steven Severin; John McGeoch; Peter Clarke
- Producers: Nigel Gray; Siouxsie and the Banshees

Siouxsie and the Banshees singles chronology
"Christine" (1980)	"Israel" (1980)	"Spellbound" (1981)

Music video
- "Israel" on YouTube

"Israel" is a song by British rock band Siouxsie and the Banshees, released as a stand-alone single in 1980 by Polydor Records.

While touring in Europe in autumn 1980, the band wanted to write a Christmas song to be released on time for December of that year. They composed it on the road, which was quite unusual for them. It was the first time that Siouxsie Sioux and Steven Severin composed a single with guitarist John McGeoch and drummer Budgie.

The song was co-produced by Nigel Gray: it prominently featured a 30-singer Welsh choir on backing vocals. It soon became a classic of their repertoire and was regularly performed during encores at each of their tours.

The song was a favourite of several artists including Air's composer Jean-Benoît Dunckel who selected it as one of his 10 all-time favourite songs, and the band Ride who selected it as a song of their intro tape on tour. Producer Howie B. (a frequent collaborator of Björk and Tricky in the 1990s) included it in a list of songs representing the music he listened to when he grew up in Glasgow.

== Release ==
"Israel" was released as a stand-alone single in between the albums Kaleidoscope (1980) and Juju (1981) on 28 November 1980 by record label Polydor. It peaked at No. 41 on the UK Singles Chart. It was the band's first single to be also released on a 12-inch although the track lengths on both sides of the 12-inch edition were the same as on the 7-inch.

Although it reached No. 73 on the US National Disco Action Top 100 chart as an import, "Israel" did not appear on a Siouxsie and the Banshees album until the release of the Once Upon a Time/The Singles compilation the following year, although some copies of the US release of Juju on PVC Records included a free copy of this single.

The song was remastered in 2002 for the compilation CD The Best of Siouxsie and the Banshees and was also featured as a bonus track on the 2006 Kaleidoscope reissue.

== Track listing ==
All tracks are written by Siouxsie Sioux, Steven Severin, John McGeoch and Peter Clarke. All tracks produced by Nigel Gray and Siouxsie and the Banshees.

7-inch and 12-inch single
No.	Title	Length
1.	"Israel"	4:54
2.	"Red Over White"	4:31

== Charts ==
Chart (1980)	Peak position
UK Singles (OCC)	41
Billboard US Hot Dance/Disco	73
