= O Baby =

Single by Siouxsie and the Banshees

from the album The Rapture
- B-side: B Side Ourselves; Swimming Horses (Live); All Tomorrow's Parties (Live)
- Released: 28 December 1994
- Recorded: 1994
- Genre: Pop rock; alternative rock
- Label: Polydor
- Songwriters: Siouxsie and the Banshees
- Producer: John Cale

Siouxsie and the Banshees singles chronology
"Face to Face" (1992)	"O Baby" (1994)	"Stargazer" (1995)

Music video
- "O Baby" on YouTube

Siouxsie Sioux singles chronology
""Interlude"; Morrissey & Siouxsie" (1994)	"O Baby" (1995)	"Stargazer" (1995)

"O Baby" is a song written and recorded by English rock band Siouxsie and the Banshees. It was produced by John Cale and released in December 1994, by Polydor Records, as the first single from the band's 11th studio album, The Rapture (1995).

== Background, music and video ==
The song is much different musically and lyrically than almost all of Siouxsie and the Banshees' previous releases. It is an up-tempo love song with a skipping rhythm, light guitar work and straightforward, cheerful lyrics by Siouxsie Sioux ("...the cracks in the ground grin up at me / Even the creases in my shoes smile up at me..."). The promotional video was shot in Flagstaff, Arizona at a beauty pageant with young girls: director John Hillcoat filmed it as a documentary.

The B-side, "B Side Ourselves", was performed by the band during all the shows of their 1995 tour. The extra tracks were live acoustic versions of "Swimming Horses" and "All Tomorrow's Parties" (composed by the Velvet Underground), both recorded in December 1991 at a concert organized by radio station KROQ.

"O Baby" was the last Siouxsie and the Banshees single to hit the top 40, peaking at number 34 in the UK Singles Chart. It was also their last entry on the U.S. Modern Rock Tracks chart, where it reached number 21. Crossing over from the alternative camp to daytime radio airplay, the song became a surprise hit on European radio, and topped the Polish Music chart [radio airplay] for three weeks - it was the most broadcast track on radio in Poland in February 1995.

== Critical reception ==
Cathi Unsworth from Melody Maker named 'O Baby' "the wonderful prelude" to Rapture, and described it as "deliciously pop". Pan-European magazine Music & Media commented, "With John Cale in the producer's seat and backed by brushed drums and African-styled guitars, Siouxsie has recaptured her magic touch which she lost so dramatically last time around." Music Week gave it a full score of five out of five, praising it as "a wonderful lilting pop song that is destined to be a very large hit. Brushed drums and a calypso-style melody drift under Siouxsie's distinctive vocals on this remarkable track."

== Track listing ==
- UK 7" single
1. "O Baby"
2. "B Side Ourselves"

Note: Also released on cassette

- UK CD single 1
1. "O Baby"
2. "B Side Ourselves"
3. "O Baby (Manhattan Mix)"
- UK CD single 2
1. "O Baby"
2. "Swimming Horses (Live)" (acoustic live version recorded at KROQ Radio on 21 December 1991)
3. "All Tomorrow's Parties (Live)" (acoustic live version recorded at KROQ Radio on 21 December 1991)

== Charts ==
Chart (1995)	Peak position
Europe (European Hit Radio)	22
Poland Airplay (Music & Media)	1
UK Singles (OCC)	34
US Modern Rock Tracks (Billboard)	21
