= Kaleidoscope (Siouxsie and the Banshees album) =

1980 studio album by Siouxsie and the Banshees

Studio album by Siouxsie and the Banshees
- Released: 1 August 1980
- Recorded: February–May 1980
- Studios: Coach (Monmouth); Surrey Sound (Leatherhead); Polydor (London)
- Genres: Post-punk; new wave; neo-psychedelia; electronic
- Length: 40:44
- Label: Polydor
- Producers: Nigel Gray; Siouxsie and the Banshees

Siouxsie and the Banshees chronology
Join Hands (1979)	Kaleidoscope (1980)	Juju (1981)

Singles from Kaleidoscope
- 1. "Happy House" Released: 7 March 1980; 2. "Christine" Released: 30 May 1980

Kaleidoscope is the third studio album by the British rock band Siouxsie and the Banshees, released on 1 August 1980 by Polydor Records. With the departure of John McKay and Kenny Morris and their replacement by two new musicians, Budgie on drums and John McGeoch on guitars, the band changed their musical direction and introduced new instruments such as synthesizers and drums machines depending on the tracks.

The album was preceded by the singles "Happy House" and "Christine". In the UK, Kaleidoscope became their most successful album to date, climbing to No. 5 in the albums chart.

== Background and music ==
Following the departure of McKay and Morris, the band regrouped and redirected their sound for their third record. Departing from their previous work, the Banshees incorporated synthesizers and drum machines for the first time. They particularly experimented in electronic music on a couple of tracks: the electro-rock minimalism of "Red Light" and the atmospheric, synth-based piece "Lunar Camel". The album also contained what could be described as a ballad, "Desert Kisses". Kaleidoscope marked the debut of guitarist John McGeoch and new drummer Budgie. Siouxsie Sioux saw it "like a new lease of life". The songs had been demoed at Warner Chappell studios with only a bass and a synthesizer played by Siouxsie and Steven Severin. After the 1979 tour, Siouxsie had been ordered to take one month of rest by doctors; she used this time to learn to play guitar and compose music for the first time.

When they recorded the final track of the album "Skin", Budgie asked co-producer Nigel Gray if he could add a second drum kit, as if "I was playing to myself a ‘call and answer'." During a session, the members experimented with swapping roles; Budgie equally played bass, and bassist Severin played guitar on "Tenant".

== Release ==
Kaleidoscope was released on 1 August 1980 by record label Polydor. The album peaked at No. 5 in the UK Albums Chart, the highest position the band has achieved to date. A 180-gram vinyl reissue of the album, remastered from the original ¼” tapes and cut at half-speed at Abbey Road Studios by Miles Showell, was released in December 2018.

== Critical reception ==
Professional ratings
Review scores
Source	Rating
AllMusic	4.5/5 stars
Record Mirror	4/5 stars

Melody Maker's Paolo Hewitt gave the album qualified praise, summarising it as "a kaleidoscope of sound and imagery, new forms, and content, flashing before our eyes". Singling out the tracks "Paradise Place" and "Skin", Hewitt called them "classic Banshee pieces. Hypnotic, relentless and incisive". Writing for ZigZag, Kris Needs hailed it as "probably the most varied, diverse and adventurous offering yet to shimmer under the Banshees' banner", praising the band's new musical direction: "Tracks veer from the lightest electronic backdrop pulse to surging soundwalls as mesmeric and powerful as anything they've done. But the subtlety evident in 'Happy House' and marvellous 'Christine' are the pointers to the main content of 'Kaleidoscope'". Needs noted that Siouxsie's voice "gained new strength and depth, but she's also widened beyond singing and writing to include synth, piano and a spot of guitar". Record Mirror praised it in a 4 out if 5 star review, saying: there is an "eerie quality" on almost all the album. The band's work on the singles "Happy House" and "Christine" was revered shortly after their release in Flexipop magazine by peers the Jam in their Current Favourite Records; singer-songwriter Paul Weller said that both songs used "some unusual sounds", while drummer Rick Buckler qualified them as "innovative".

In his retrospective review, David Cleary of AllMusic described Kaleidoscope as a "strong record" with "extraordinarily imaginative production values, featuring intricate synthesizer-flecked arrangements; psychedelic touches in "Christine", spaceship synthesizer swoops in "Tenant" and rhythmic camera clicks in "Red Light" all enliven their respective songs". Music journalist Gary Mulholland saw it as "a poppy sense of freedom" after the departure of McKay and Morris. The 2004 edition of The Rolling Stone Album Guide gave a 3 out 5 rating saying that with the change in personnel, Kaleidoscope refined "the Banshees' attack, diversifying the sound without losing its swirling impact". In 2020, Rolling Stone included Kaleidoscope in the top 40 of their "80 Greatest albums of 1980" list, praising McGeoch as "one of the Eighties' unsung guitar masters" and Siouxsie's "vocal charisma".

== Legacy ==
Kaleidoscope influenced several musicians including the Cure frontman Robert Smith, Johnny Marr of the Smiths, Thom Yorke and Ed O'Brien of Radiohead, Bobby Gillespie of Primal Scream, Red Hot Chili Peppers with John Frusciante, Tim Burgess of the Charlatans, Santigold and the Weeknd.

When Robert Smith described the Cure's album The Head on the Door to the press in 1985, he said: "It reminds me of the Kaleidoscope album, the idea of having lots of different sounding things, different colours". During a TV interview to promote The Head on the Door, Smith also included Kaleidoscope in his "five favourite albums". In a February 2008 interview on BBC Radio 2, Johnny Marr discussed McGeoch's contribution to "Happy House": "What it is about "Happy House" from a guitar playing point of view, is for a start it's modern. It's not got any of the sort of creaky old rock'n'roll aspects to it and it still sounded like the Banshees, almost more so. That's when I really began to become a fan of John McGeoch. It was an extra bonus for me that they'd got a great guitar player who had left another band and came in as a ringer and joined and not surprisingly, that to me was a very good scenario ". Thom Yorke selected "Happy House" as one of his milestones in an interview for the BBC in 2017. Radiohead stated in 2008 interviews that they had rehearsed "Happy House" before going on tour. O'Brien added: "We've been doing all this ... stuff, ... which is our youth, really. You know, when we were teenagers. They were very formative years, and those bands".

Red Hot Chili Peppers covered "Christine" in 2001 with John Frusciante on guitar. Bobby Gillespie was inspired by both "Happy House" and "Christine" because they were pop songs with dark subject matter. He stated: "That's the idea, yeah—to use the conventional way of constructing a pop song to communicate what I feel about the world and my take on relationships. It's a twist that makes it darker than it seems. When we were growing up, Siouxsie and the Banshees were doing this kind of stuff—they were getting in the charts with songs about mental hospitals! "Happy House"? That was nearly number fucking 10 in the charts! 'Christine, the strawberry girl, Christine, banana split lady'—they were writing about a girl with schizophrenia! They were getting in pop magazines and on TV; they were getting played on daytime radio. It's fucking subversive! They were outsiders bringing outsider subjects to the mainstream". Tim Burgess of the Charlatans said: "my favourite Banshees album is Kaleidoscope, because it's been the most played [...] or maybe because of one or a dozen other reasons, 'Happy House' and 'Clockface' are both in my top 100 songs of all time". Santigold took inspiration from the song "Red Light", explaining, "'My Superman' is an interpolation of a Siouxsie Sioux song, 'Red Light'... I love her song..." Santigold also later sampled "Lunar Camel", on her Top Ranking remix album. Jeremy Jay covered the same song on his Airwalker EP.

Kaleidoscope was also praised by the singer of Suede, Brett Anderson. Erasure's Andy Bell cited it as one of his favourites :"More commercial offering from Siouxsie was much more up my street – and consequently, as with all my favourite teen angst albums, I learnt all of the songs inside out and backwards". The Weeknd sampled and used the chorus of "Happy House" on the 2011 track "House of Balloons / Glass Table Girls", included on the Trilogy album.

== Cultural references ==
In the 2006 film Notes on a Scandal, the sleeve of Kaleidoscope is shown in one of the scenes: the character played by Cate Blanchett tells her lover that it is her favourite album, calling it "a masterpiece", and that listening to the album as a teenager made her feel "invincible".

== Track listing ==
=== Original release ===
All tracks written by Siouxsie and Steven Severin, except "Trophy" written by Siouxsie, Severin and John McGeoch. All lyrics by Siouxsie except "Christine" and "Red Light" by Severin.

Side one

1. "Happy House" – 3:53
2. "Tenant" – 3:43
3. "Trophy" – 3:20
4. "Hybrid" – 5:33
5. "Clockface" – 1:55
6. "Lunar Camel" – 3:03

Side two

1. "Christine" – 3:01
2. "Desert Kisses" – 4:16
3. "Red Light" – 3:23
4. "Paradise Place" – 4:36
5. "Skin" – 3:50

=== 2006 remastered reissue bonus tracks ===
12. "Christine" (demo version)
13. "Eve White/Eve Black" (demo version)
14. "Arabia (Lunar Camel)" (demo version)
15. "Sitting Room" (unreleased track)
16. "Paradise Place" (demo version)
17. "Desert Kisses" (demo version)
18. "Hybrid" (demo version)
19. "Happy House" (demo version)
20. "Israel" (7" A-Side)

== Personnel ==
Siouxsie and the Banshees

- Siouxsie Sioux – vocals, acoustic guitar (2), electric guitar (10), synthesizer (6), finger cymbals (8), camera (9), melodica (11), production
- Steven Severin – bass guitar (1, 3–8, 10, 11), electric guitar and electric sitar (2), synthesizer (5, 9), production
- Budgie – drums (1–5, 7–11), harmonica (1), bass guitar (2), percussion, production

Additional personnel

- John McGeoch – guitar (1, 3, 4, 7, 8), saxophone (3, 4), Farfisa organ (7), sitar and string synthesizer (8)
- Steve Jones – guitar (5, 10, 11)

Additional credits

- The Sirens (Severin, Budgie and McGeoch) – backing vocals (8)

Technical

- Nigel Gray – production
- Siouxsie and the Banshees – production
- Rob O'Connor – art direction
- Joe Lyons – sleeve photography
- Rose Harrison – illustrations
- Recorded at Surrey Sound, The Coach House, and Polydor Studios, January–May 1980

== Charts ==
Chart performance for Kaleidoscope
Chart (1980–1981)	Peak position
New Zealand Albums (RMNZ)	30
UK Albums (Official Charts)	5

== Certifications ==
Certifications for Kaleidoscope
Region	Certification	Certified units/sales
United Kingdom (BPI)	Silver	60,000^{^}
^{^} Shipments figures based on certification alone.

== Bibliography ==
- Sullivan-Burke, Rory (April 2022). The Light Pours Out of Me: The Authorised Biography of John McGeoch. Omnibus Press. ISBN 978-1913172664.
