= Tinderbox (Siouxsie and the Banshees album) =

1986 studio album by Siouxsie and the Banshees

Studio album by Siouxsie and the Banshees
- Released: 21 April 1986
- Recorded: May and August–September 1985
- Studios: Hansa by the Wall, West Berlin (Note: Except "Cities in Dust"); Matrix, London (Note: "Cities in Dust")
- Genres: Alternative rock; gothic rock; post-punk
- Length: 38:21
- Labels: Polydor; Geffen (US)
- Producers: Siouxsie and the Banshees

Siouxsie and the Banshees chronology
The Thorn (1984)	Tinderbox (1986)	Through the Looking Glass (1987)

Singles from Tinderbox
- 1. "Cities in Dust" Released: 18 October 1985; 2. "Candyman" Released: 28 February 1986

Tinderbox is the seventh studio album by the English rock band Siouxsie and the Banshees. It was released on 21 April 1986 by Wonderland and Polydor Records in the United Kingdom and by Geffen Records in the United States. It was the band's first full-length effort recorded with then-new guitarist John Valentine Carruthers; Carruthers had previously only added a few parts on the 1984 EP The Thorn. The first recording sessions for the album took place at Hansa by the Wall in West Berlin in May 1985.

Two songs were released as singles between late 1985 and early 1986, "Cities in Dust" and "Candyman". Tinderbox peaked at number 13 on the UK Albums Chart and at number 88 on the US Billboard 200.

PopMatters included it on their list of the "12 essential alternative rock albums from the 1980s", and alternative rock artists including Billy Howerdel of A Perfect Circle, Jean-Benoît Dunckel of Air and Rachel Goswell of Slowdive, have cited it as an inspiration.

== Background ==
The album was written to be presented live on stage in full like Juju was in 1981 on its subsequent tour. After rehearsing the songs for months and demoing them in late 1984, the band went abroad to West Berlin to record the new material in May 1985 (they had previously recorded in West Germany, in Bavaria, for The Thorn EP). The lead single, "Cities in Dust", was the only track that was entirely recorded at Matrix Studios in London in September. The rest of the vocal parts were done at AIR Studios in December.

At the beginning of the song "92°", there is a sample from the 1953 film It Came from Outer Space with the line: "Did you know ... that more murders are committed at 92 Fahrenheit than any other temperature? I read an article once. Lower temperatures, people are easygoing. Over 92, it's too hot to move. But just 92, people get irritable".

The sleeve reproduced a picture of a tornado, taken by Lucille Handberg near the town of Jasper, Minnesota, on 8 July 1927. Her photograph has become a classic image; it had previously been used on the covers of Miles Davis' Bitches Brew (1970) and Deep Purple's Stormbringer (1974).

The album's lyrics explore themes such as natural disasters and panic.

== Release ==
Tinderbox was released on 21 April 1986. A remastered compact disc was issued in 2009 with bonus tracks including an unreleased version of "Song from the Edge of the World" non-album single with Carruthers on guitars, and an unreleased song with lyrics by Steven Severin called "Starcrossed" recorded in May 1985. The B-sides of "Cities in Dust" and "Candyman", initially added as bonus tracks on the 1986 CD version of the album, were then included on the Downside Up B-sides box set.

A 180g vinyl reissue of the album, remastered from the original ¼” tapes and cut half-speed at Abbey Road Studios by Miles Showell, was released in August 2018.

== Critical reception ==
Professional ratings
Review scores
Source	Rating
AllMusic	4.5/5 stars

Sounds praised the album on its release. Kevin Murphy wrote, "Tinderbox romps and swoons with all the majesty of Dreamhouse", and added, "it's a refreshing slant on the Banshees' disturbing perspective and restores their vivid shades to pop's pale palette." Jon Savage also hailed the record in Spin magazine: "Its scope, ease, and assurance make it a good collection for the Banshees to relaunch themselves into the international market this spring. Carruthers fits in to the point that you wouldn't know there was a change, and Budgie's drumming is superb. Apart from the singles "Cities in Dust" and "Candyman" (which perpetuates the Banshees' sinister view of childhood), the sparks fly on the crystal clear "Cannons" and the unsettling "Parties Fall". Los Angeles Times praised the album saying, it was an "exciting" and "superb offering" with "its own charms". Depeche Mode's Dave Gahan hailed the single "Candyman" as "a great Banshees record".

AllMusic reviewer David Cleary retrospectively rated the record 4.5 out of 5 stars, applauding the band for "rocking drumming, drivingly aggressive yet fully textured guitar playing, and masterful, gutsy singing. The songs here are intense [...] in fact, there's a certain satisfying feel to the musically uniform wall of sound here. ... there are ... plenty of subtle, effective production touches to be found throughout." Writing in the 2004 edition of The Rolling Stone Album Guide, Mark Coleman and Mac Randall said that Carruthers was a worthy replacement for Robert Smith and Tinderbox matched Hyæna in quality. The writers added: "'Cities in Dust' sports a knockout chorus and Siouxsie's most confident vocals to date. If she's not exactly warm, well, she certainly sounds inflamed about something."

The Quietus also praised the album and said: "By removing the focus from the guitar, Siouxsie & The Banshees forged a sound that was totally their own. Rhythmic and percussive, the rock idiom of old was eschewed in favour of a sound that was wholly their own. "Cities in Dust", the first single from Tinderbox, found the band moving into more electronic climes as Severin's recently purchased DX-7 synth discovered new territories to explore." In 2011, Brett Anderson, the lead singer of Suede, included Tinderbox on a list of albums that he called "current fascinations".

== Legacy ==
PopMatters listed it among their "12 Essential Alternative Rock Albums from the 1980s", dubbing it "a bold and enchanting album that ought to be included in any record collection".

Billy Howerdel of A Perfect Circle rated Tinderbox as his all-time favourite album. Howerdel described it as "one of the spookiest records I've ever heard. Some of the songs on there have such a dense atmosphere. Sometimes when I'm stuck, I'll listen to that. It's like sometimes when you have no inspiration and you go out and look at the Moon, that's kind of what that record is for me ... that's always been a go-to for me". Rachel Goswell of Slowdive stated Tinderbox was part of the music that influenced her the most: "Tinderbox was the first Banshees album that I heard and I fell in love with this album wholeheartedly". Mentioning the song "92°", she said, "I couldn’t count the amount of times I played this record and sang this song in my bedroom dreaming of being in a band and that being my life". Jean-Benoît Dunckel of Air selected Tinderbox for his "5 albums forever" list, saying, "They played so well together; I saw them in concert and I never forgot that moment". Flea of Red Hot Chili Peppers stated: "Tinderbox is an immaculate album". Jenny Lee Lindberg of Warpaint cited the band among her influences, as well as the song "Umbrella", initially included in the track listing of the 1986 CD version. She said: "This is a song that my husband and I bonded over – we’d definitely heard it individually before, but one day we were just playing the album and that song stopped us in our tracks… played it on repeat for the whole night. I understand why some people can hear a little Siouxsie in what we do."

== Track listing ==
All tracks written by Siouxsie and the Banshees. All lyrics written by Siouxsie Sioux, except where noted.

Side one
No.	Title	Length
1.	"Candyman"	3:44
2.	"The Sweetest Chill"	4:07
3.	"This Unrest"	6:21
4.	"Cities in Dust"	3:51

Side two
No.	Title	Length
5.	"Cannons"	3:14
6.	"Partys Fall"	4:56
7.	"92°"	6:02
8.	"Lands End"	6:06
Total length:		38:21

1986 CD bonus tracks
No.	Title	Lyrics	Length
9.	"The Quarterdrawing of the Dog"		4:59
10.	"An Execution"		3:50
11.	"Lullaby"	Steven Severin	3:33
12.	"Umbrella"		4:12
13.	"Cities in Dust" (extended eruption version)		6:49
Total length:			61:44

2009 remastered CD reissue bonus tracks
No.	Title	Lyrics	Length
9.	"Cities in Dust" (extended eruption mix)		6:51
10.	"The Sweetest Chill" (extended Chris Kimsey mix)		5:57
11.	"Song from the Edge of the World" (JVC version)	Severin	4:05
12.	"Starcrossed Lovers" (demo)	Severin	4:07
Total length:			63:21

== Personnel ==
Credits adapted from the liner notes of Tinderbox.

=== Siouxsie and the Banshees ===
- Siouxsie and the Banshees – arrangements
- Siouxsie Sioux – vocals
- Steven Severin – electric bass, keyboards
- Budgie – drums, percussion
- John Valentine Carruthers – guitars, keyboards

=== Technical ===
- Siouxsie and the Banshees – production
- Steve Churchyard – mixing (AIR Studios, December 1985)
- Nick Robbins – mixing assistance
- Hugh Jones – recording (Hansa by the Wall, May 1985)
- Julian Standen – recording (Matrix, September 1985)

=== Artwork ===
- Lucille Handberg – cover photograph
- Joe Lyons – photography

== Charts ==
Chart performance for Tinderbox
Chart (1986)	Peak position
Australian Albums (Kent Music Report)	97
Dutch Albums (Album Top 100)	51
European Albums (Music & Media)	50
New Zealand Albums (RMNZ)	34
Swedish Albums (Sverigetopplistan)	32
UK Albums (Official Charts)	13
US Billboard 200	88
