= Red Light (Siouxsie and the Banshees song) =

1980 song by Siouxsie and the Banshees

Song by Siouxsie and the Banshees

from the album Kaleidoscope
- Released: 1 August 1980
- Recorded: 1980
- Genre: New wave, electro-rock
- Length: 3:23
- Label: Polydor
- Composers: Siouxsie Sioux, Steven Severin
- Lyricist: Steven Severin
- Producers: Nigel Gray; Siouxsie and the Banshees

Music video
- "Red Light" on YouTube

"Red Light" is a song by rock band Siouxsie and the Banshees. It is the ninth track from their 1980 album Kaleidoscope. It was co-produced with Nigel Gray.

== Writing, recording and video ==
The song was demoed by Siouxsie Sioux and Steven Severin at Warner Chappell studios. Severin wrote the lyric. He said: it was "originally a piece of automatic writing called "Exposure" (I was using "cutups" to invent words like "shutterslut")."

It was then recorded as a trio, with Severin on synthesisers, Siouxsie on vocals and Budgie on drums. The song featured the beat of "the Roland compu rhythm and a camera shutter motor rewind". Budgie related: "I wanted the drums to fade in over the electronica beat and evoke a smoky club atmosphere".

Although it was not released as the third single of Kaleidoscope, a promo video for the song was shot by Clive Richardson on the same day as the video for the single "Christine".

== Legacy ==
Santigold recorded an interpolation of the song on her track "My Superman" on her debut album Santogold. She stated: "I remember one of the first times I heard "Red Light" it was at a party, and I remember going up to the DJ and being like, "Who's this?". It was that good. I kind of stopped and was like ... wow".
