= Stargazer (Siouxsie and the Banshees song) =

1995 single by Siouxsie and the Banshees

Single by Siouxsie and the Banshees

from the album The Rapture
- B-side: "Hang Me High"; "Black Sun"
- Released: 6 February 1995
- Genre: Alternative rock, pop rock
- Label: Polydor
- Songwriters: Siouxsie and the Banshees
- Producers: Siouxsie and the Banshees

Siouxsie and the Banshees singles chronology
"O Baby" (1995)	"Stargazer" (1995)

Siouxsie Sioux singles chronology
"O Baby" (1995)	"Stargazer" (1995)	"Eraser Cut the Creatures" (1998)

Music video
- "Stargazer" on YouTube

"Stargazer" is a song written, produced, and performed by English rock band Siouxsie and the Banshees. It was released as the second single from the band's 11th studio album, The Rapture. It was the band's last single released, due to their disbandment the following year.

== Background and music ==
The track is an up-tempo, guitar-driven pop tune. It was slightly remixed by Mark Saunders for its single release, bringing the bass further forward in the mix. Club remixes were produced by Juno Reactor. Lyrically the song casts Siouxsie Sioux as a dreamer who looks up at the stars and wishes for a better life and to "escape this straitjacket of constraint".

"Stargazer" did not chart in the United States but peaked at No. 64 in the UK Singles Chart. As of 2026, it is the final single released by the band. Shortly after the release of this single, Siouxsie and the Banshees disbanded, leaving Siouxsie and Budgie to direct their priorities to their other group the Creatures.

The single remix version (which originally appeared on the CD single) was included on The Best of Siouxsie and the Banshees (2002), rather than the album version; it was the only track from The Rapture to be included. The Saunders mix was also used in the music video for the song, which was featured on the DVD in the deluxe sound & vision edition of The Best Of.

== Track listings ==
UK 7-inch and cassette single

1. "Stargazer"
2. "Hang Me High"

UK CD1 (glitter sleeve - limited edition fold out digipak)

1. "Stargazer"
2. "Hang Me High"
3. "Black Sun"

UK CD2

1. "Stargazer"
2. "Stargazer" (Mambo Sun Mix)*
3. "Stargazer" (Planet Queen Mix)*
4. "Stargazer" (Mark Saunders Mix)
- Remixed by Juno Reactor

== Charts ==
Chart (1995)	Peak position
UK Singles (OCC	64
