= Batman Returns (soundtrack) =

Batman Returns: Original Motion Picture Soundtrack

Soundtrack album by Danny Elfman
- Released: June 23, 1992
- Genre: Soundtrack
- Length: 69:55
- Label: Warner Bros.
- Producers: Danny Elfman and Steve Bartek

Danny Elfman chronology
Darkman (1990)	Batman Returns: Original Motion Picture Soundtrack (1992)	The Nightmare Before Christmas (1993)

Singles from Batman Returns
- 1. "Face to Face" Released: July 13, 1992

Professional ratings
Review scores
Source	Rating
AllMusic	3/5 stars
Filmtracks	3/5 stars
Musicfromthemovies	favorable
Soundtrack-Express	3/5 stars
SoundtrackNet	4.5/5 stars

Batman Returns: Original Motion Picture Soundtrack is the score album for the 1992 film Batman Returns by Danny Elfman. The soundtrack also includes "Face to Face", a song written by the band Siouxsie and the Banshees and Elfman, that was used to promote the movie.

== Track listing ==
No.	Title	Artist	Length
1.	"Birth of a Penguin, Part I"		2:27
2.	"Birth of a Penguin, Part II"		3:09
3.	"The Lair, Part I"		0:57
4.	"The Lair, Part II"		4:49
5.	"Selina Transforms, Part I"		1:11
6.	"Selina Transforms, Part II"		4:16
7.	"The Cemetery"		2:54
8.	"Cat Suite"		5:41
9.	"Batman Vs. the Circus"		2:35
10.	"The Rise and Fall from Grace, Part I"		1:41
11.	"The Rise and Fall from Grace, Part II"		4:08
12.	"Sore Spots"		2:15
13.	"Rooftops / Wild Ride, Part I"		4:19
14.	"Rooftops / Wild Ride, Part II"		3:34
15.	"The Children's Hour"		1:47
16.	"The Final Confrontation, Part I"		5:12
17.	"The Final Confrontation, Part II"		4:54
18.	"The Finale, Part I"		2:40
19.	"The Finale, Part II"		2:19
20.	"End Credits"		4:44
21.	"Face to Face"	Siouxsie and the Banshees	4:17
Total length:			69:58

The usage of multiple instances of "Part I" and "Part II" prompted confusion from consumers, and was heavily criticized by soundtrack critic site Filmtracks, who proposed a different tracklist.

=== Complete score ===
La-La Land Records released Danny Elfman's complete score to Batman Returns on November 30, 2010.

Disc one

No.	Title	Length
1.	"Birth of a Penguin / Main Title"	5:40
2.	"Penguin Spies*"	1:11
3.	"Shadow of Doom* / Clown Attack* / Introducing the Bat**"	5:03
4.	"Intro* / The Zoo** / The Lair"	6:02
5.	"Caught in the Act* / Uh-Oh Max*"	2:00
6.	"Kitty Party* / Selina Transforms**"	5:32
7.	"Penguin's Grand Deed*"	1:52
8.	"The List Begins*"	0:47
9.	"The Cemetery"	2:58
10.	"Catwoman Saves Joan* / The New Woman*"	2:05
11.	"Penguin's Surprise"	1:45
12.	"Bad, Bad Dog** / Batman vs. Circus / Selina's Shopping Spree**"	5:44
13.	"Cat Chase**"	2:14
14.	"Candidate Cobblepot*"	1:00
15.	"The Plan* / Kidnapping*"	2:34
16.	"Sore Spots / Batman's Closet*"	3:24
17.	"The Plot Unfolds*"	1:17
18.	"Roof Top Encounters**"	4:51
19.	"Batman's Wild Ride**"	4:21
20.	"Fall from Grace**"	4:19
21.	"Revealed* / Party Crasher*"	3:18
Total length:		67:57

Disc two

No.	Title	Artist	Length
1.	"Umbrella Source / The Children's Hour / War**"		7:55
2.	"Final Confrontation** / Finale"		9:17
3.	"A Shadow of Doubt** / End Credits**"		6:17
4.	"Face to Face"	Siouxsie and the Banshees	4:24

Alternative and album cues
No.	Title	Length
5.	"The Zoo (alternate)**"	1:02
6.	"The List Begins (alternate)*"	0:48
7.	"Cat Chase (alternate ending)**"	2:15
8.	"Roof Top Encounters (original)**"	4:51
9.	"Fall From Grace (alternate ending)**"	4:20
10.	"The Lair, Part I"	0:58
11.	"The Lair, Part II"	4:53
12.	"Selina Transforms, Part I"	1:12
13.	"Selina Transforms, Part II"	4:17
14.	"Batman vs. The Circus"	2:37
15.	"Cat Suite"	5:45
16.	"A Shadow of Doubt (alternate)** / End Credits (alternate)"	7:08

Bonus Track
No.	Title	Length
17.	"Super Freak"	3:23
Total length:		71:20

(*) Previously unreleased
(**) Contains previously unreleased material

== Chart positions ==
Chart (1992)	Peak position
U.S. Billboard 200	61
