= Song from the Edge of the World =

Single by Siouxsie and the Banshees
- B-side: "The Whole Price of Blood"; "Mechanical Eyes"
- Released: 13 July 1987
- Recorded: 1987
- Genre: Alternative rock
- Label: Polydor; Geffen (US)
- Songwriters: Susan Ballion; Peter Edward Clarke; Steven Severin
- Producer: Mike Thorne

Siouxsie and the Banshees singles chronology
"The Passenger" (1987)	"Song from the Edge of the World" (1987)	"Peek-a-Boo" (1988)

Music video
- "Song from the Edge of the World" on YouTube

"Song from the Edge of the World" is a song written and performed by the English rock band Siouxsie and the Banshees. It was released as a stand-alone single in 1987. The song had been premiered live in the UK during an appearance at the WOMAD Festival in July 1986. The song was recorded with new members Martin McCarrick on keyboards and Jon Klein on guitar.

== Music and background ==
The track is an uptempo number with strong percussion performed by drummer Budgie. The song had already been demoed during the Tinderbox-era with guitarist John Valentine Carruthers but not released at the time. In January 1987, the group had also recorded it during a radio session at the BBC for Janice Long.

The single version was recorded in late May and early June 1987 with two new members, guitarist Jon Klein and keyboardist Martin McCarrick.

The single had not appeared on any album and was not included on any greatest hits collections until 2002's The Best of Siouxsie and the Banshees, albeit only on the bonus disc of the limited edition of the album, and in its 12-inch "Columbus Mix" version. The original 7" version made its CD debut as a bonus track on the 2014 reissue of Through The Looking Glass.

Siouxsie Sioux later explained that she hadn't been satisfied with the work of producer Mike Thorne during the recording sessions. Finally it was the sound engineer who managed to find the right production for Siouxsie's voice. This was one of the reasons the band decided not to include it on their 1992 Twice Upon a Time - The Singles compilation. The early studio version performed with Carruthers was included on the remastered CD version of Tinderbox.

"Song from the Edge of the World" peaked at No. 59 in the UK Singles Chart.

B-side "The Whole Price of Blood" was originally intended for Hyæna and composed as a "sister piece" to Swimming Horses. The final release repurposes percussion and sitar provided by Budgie and Robert Smith during the original demo session in 1983.
