= Candyman (Siouxsie and the Banshees song) =

Single by Siouxsie and the Banshees

from the album Tinderbox
- B-side: "Lullaby"; "Umbrella"
- Released: 28 February 1986
- Recorded: May 1985
- Genre: Alternative rock; Gothic rock
- Label: Polydor
- Songwriters: Susan Ballion, Peter Edward Clarke and Steven Severin
- Producers: Siouxsie and the Banshees

Siouxsie and the Banshees singles chronology
"Cities in Dust" (1985)	"Candyman" (1986)	"This Wheel's on Fire" (1987)

Music video
- "Candyman" on YouTube

"Candyman" is a song written and produced by British rock band Siouxsie and the Banshees. It was released as the second single from their seventh studio album Tinderbox (1986). The song became the band's 13th top 40 hit, peaking at number 34 in the UK Singles Chart.

The song is about child abuse. Musically, it is a guitar-based number with distinctive use of arpeggios by John Valentine Carruthers. Melody Maker hailed the single upon its release, saying it was "thrilling". [...] "Big and brash and clashing, its many parts combine to form one spirited, unpredictable yet wholly co-ordinated outburst while Siouxsie's voice, in confident control, bounces up and down and around the repeating motifs, and unexpected twist of arrangements."
