= Marc Hogan =

American music journalist

- Born: October 3, 1981 (age 44); U.S.
- Education: Northwestern University
- Occupation: Journalist
- Known for: Writing for Pitchfork
- Spouse: Angela Hogan
- Children: Frank and Lucy Hogan

Marc Hogan (born October 3, 1981) is an American journalist. He is most known for his time as a senior staff writer at Pitchfork.

== Career ==
Hogan was a music critic at Pitchfork from 2004 to 2024. He has contributed to a number of other publications, including SPIN, the Financial Times, eMusic.com editorial site Wondering Sound, NPR Music, Billboard, Salon, BusinessWeek.com, Paste, Playboy.com, and the Chicago Tribune, and he has discussed his work on NPR, the BBC, Sound Opinions, WNYC, ABC World News Webcast, and CNBC. He also contributed to the book The Pitchfork 500: Our Guide to the Greatest Songs From Punk to the Present.

In 2005, The New York Times columnist David Carr wrote of one of his Pitchfork album reviews that "the writer, Marc Hogan ... in his rave goes over the top and stays there to very nice effect." Slate cited his reviews in a 2006 piece titled "Die, Pitchfork, Die!: The indie music site that everyone loves to hate."

Hogan was among the first to report on the cassette revival (in a 2010 article for Pitchfork) and broke the story of Will Ferrell challenging Metallica's Lars Ulrich to a drum battle (in a 2014 article for SPIN). In 2012, New York Times columnist Maureen Dowd quoted his SPIN coverage of Nicki Minaj.

In a 2017 article for Pitchfork, Hogan published graphic excerpts from the deposition of a woman whom rapper XXXTentacion was charged with beating, strangling and imprisoning while she was pregnant. Also that year, American music critic Robert Christgau cited "reviewer-turned-staff-writer Marc Hogan, an experienced investigative reporter with a grasp of basic political reality." Christgau wrote, "I say give Hogan a column that would spur him to dig up as much such stuff as he can."

He is a two-time Da Capo Best Music Writing "notable" mention.

In January 2024, Hogan was laid off from Pitchfork following magazine owner Condé Nast announcing that the website would be folded in with GQ magazine. He has since contributed to The New York Times, NPR, and The Financial Times.

== Personal life ==
Based in Des Moines, Iowa, Hogan has lived in California, Tennessee, Arizona, Massachusetts, Illinois, and New York. He graduated from the Medill School of Journalism at Northwestern University.
