= The Last Beat of My Heart =

Single by Siouxsie and the Banshees

from the album Peepshow
- B-side: El Dia de Los Muertos; Sunless
- Released: 21 November 1988
- Recorded: 1988
- Genre: Alternative rock, art rock
- Label: Polydor
- Songwriters: Susan Ballion, Peter Edward Clarke and Steven Severin
- Producers: Mike Hedges; Siouxsie and the Banshees

Siouxsie and the Banshees singles chronology
"The Killing Jar" (1988)	"The Last Beat of My Heart" (1988)	"Kiss Them for Me" (1991)

Music video
- "The Last Beat of My Heart" on YouTube

Siouxsie singles chronology
"The Killing Jar" (1988)	"The Last Beat of My Heart" (1988)	""Standing There"; The Creatures" (1989)

"The Last Beat of My Heart" is a song written, produced and recorded by English rock band Siouxsie and the Banshees. It was released in late 1988 as the third and final single from the band's ninth studio album, Peepshow. In 2021, Spin rated it in their list of "the 50 best alt-rock love songs", for its "slow-climbing swell of accordion and muted tom-tom thump", qualifying it as a "perfect marriage of words and atmosphere".

== Music and legacy ==
The song is a ballad with strings and accordion. Siouxsie's vocals addressed a lover who is leaving a relationship, as she asked for him to return to her. She declared her desire to be "close to you til the last beat of my heart".

Several musicians later praised the song. The Decemberists qualified it as one of their favourite Siouxsie and the Banshees songs. Arcade Fire singer Win Butler suggested the band DeVotchKa to cover it and they recorded a version on their 2006 EP Curse Your Little Heart. The Flowers of Hell released a version on their 2012 album Odes, on which they covered their influences.

"The Last Beat of My Heart" reached number 44 in the UK Singles Chart in December 1988. Upon its inclusion on the 1992 compilation album Twice Upon a Time - The Singles, a live version of the song from 1991 recorded on the last date of the Lollapalooza festival replaced the single version. A live video of that version was also filmed by a production company on the same day and uploaded on YouTube in 2007.
