= Face to Face (Siouxsie and the Banshees song) =

Song by Siouxsie and the Banshees

Single by Siouxsie and the Banshees

from the album Batman Returns
- B-side: "I Could Be Again"; "Hothead"
- Released: 13 July 1992
- Recorded: 1992
- Genre: Alternative rock; dark pop
- Length: 4:17
- Label: Polydor; Warner Bros. (US)
- Songwriters: Siouxsie and the Banshees; Danny Elfman
- Producer: Stephen Hague

Siouxsie and the Banshees singles chronology
"Fear (of the Unknown)" (1991)	"Face to Face" (1992)	"O Baby" (1995)

Music video
- "Face to Face" on YouTube

Siouxsie Sioux singles chronology
"Fear (of the Unknown)" (1991)	"Face to Face" (1992)	""Interlude"; Morrissey & Siouxsie" (1994)

"Face to Face" is a song recorded by English rock band Siouxsie and the Banshees. It was composed by the group along with Danny Elfman and was produced by Stephen Hague. The track was featured in the 1992 film Batman Returns and is included on its soundtrack. The director of the film, Tim Burton, asked the band to compose the main song of the movie. Upon its release in July 1992, the song entered the singles charts in the UK and in Europe.

In the US, tension between people working at the film studio division of Warner Bros. and the executives of Warner Bros. Records label occurred, and the song was ultimately released a few weeks after the film opening date, and only on cassette. Geffen, the band's US record company, did not get the license to release the song.

== Music and background ==
The song featured strings that build to a dramatic conclusion. Lyrically, the song makes indirect references to the film's characters Bruce Wayne/Batman played by Michael Keaton, and Selina Kyle/Catwoman played by Michelle Pfeiffer. "Face to Face" was heard in the film during a ballroom scene in which the characters dance together, not realising that, as their alter-egos (Batman and Catwoman), they are enemies. The lyrics reflected the characters' conflict ("...Cheek to cheek / the bitter sweet / commit your crime / in your deadly time / It's too divine / I want to bend / I want this bliss / but something says I must resist..."). At one point, lead singer Siouxsie Sioux can be heard purring like a cat, a reference to Catwoman. Tim Burton requested the Banshees to write the song of the film: "I've always been a fan – Siouxsie is one of very few women who can create a realistic primal cat sound".

The recording sessions took place at Real World studios in Bath, southwest of England. The strings were then recorded in Los Angeles with Danny Elfman, who composed and supervised the score for Batman Returns. In the film, the song can be heard in one scene and during the end credits.

== Release ==
In the US, the song was first included on the Batman Returns movie soundtrack album, which was released by Warner Bros. Records on 23 June 1992. Due to contractual problems, the song was then released on its own a couple of weeks later in the US, but only on cassette by Warner Bros, which had owned the copyright for the Batman Returns soundtrack. Consequently, Geffen, the band's US record company, didn't have the license and was not allowed to release the song on any other format. Outside the US, Polydor found an agreement with Warner Bros to release the song as a single, on vinyl, 7-inch and 12-inch, and on cassette and CD. 808 State remixed the song, issued as "Face to Face (Catatonic Mix)".

"Face to Face" peaked at No. 21 in the UK Singles Chart. It also performed well on American alternative rock radios, where the single peaked at No. 7 on the U.S. Billboard Modern Rock Tracks chart.

The track later appeared on the band 1992's compilation album Twice Upon a Time - The Singles and was remastered in 2002 for The Best of Siouxsie and the Banshees.

== Critical reception ==
At the time of its release as a single, the Stud Brothers wrote in Melody Maker: "It's a slow, heavily orchestral & sensuously tense piece with Siouxsie first tapt, then cracked and finally spiralling off into the ether".

== Promotional video ==
Two versions of the music video picturing Siouxsie surrounded with cats were made: the video broadcast on music channels also included a few shots from the movie with Michelle Pfeiffer as Catwoman. Burton initially wanted to direct the video but had to cancel after Warner Bros. asked for a new sequence to change the end of the movie. Burton's assistant Neil Abramson stepped in and "followed Burton's plan to match the video to the film".

== Track listing ==
UK 7" single

1. "Face to Face"
2. "I Could Be Again"
- also released on cassette

UK 12" picture disc single

1. "Face to Face" (Catatonic Mix) *
2. "I Could Be Again"
3. "Hothead"

UK CD single (Available as a limited edition foldout digipak)

1. "Face to Face"
2. "I Could Be Again"
3. "Hothead"
4. "Face to Face" (Catatonic Mix) *

(* Mixed by 808 State)

US cassette single

1. "Face to Face"
2. "Sea of Light"

== Charts ==
Chart (1992)	Peak position
Australia (ARIA)	184
Sweden (Sverigetopplistan)	23
UK Singles (OCC)	21
UK Airplay (Music Week)	33
US Modern Rock Tracks (Billboard)	7
