= Christine (Siouxsie and the Banshees song) =

Single by Siouxsie and the Banshees

from the album Kaleidoscope
- B-side: "Eve White, Eve Black"
- Released: 30 May 1980
- Recorded: 1980
- Genre: Post-punk
- Length: 3:00
- Label: Polydor
- Songwriters: Siouxsie Sioux; Steven Severin
- Producers: Nigel Gray; Siouxsie and the Banshees

Siouxsie and the Banshees singles chronology
"Happy House" (1980)	"Christine" (1980)	"Israel" (1981)

Official video
- "Christine" on YouTube

"Christine" is a song by English rock band Siouxsie and the Banshees, written by Siouxsie Sioux and Steven Severin. It was released in 1980 by Polydor as the second single from the then-unreleased third album, Kaleidoscope. The title of said album also comes from a lyric in "Christine".

== Content, music video and release ==
"Christine" marked a change in musical direction for the band, with new guitarist John McGeoch. The song begins with a distinctive riff played on an acoustic guitar. The post-chorus instrumentation includes electronic organ. The close of the song utilizes a strong flanging effect. The lyrics were inspired by the book The Three Faces of Eve which related the story of Christine Sizemore, a woman who reportedly had 22 different personalities.

The B-side, "Eve White/Eve Black", continues with the theme. Bassist Steven Severin stated in the liner notes for Downside Up: "Again a companion piece to the A side 'Christine'. Eve White and Eve Black were two of Christine Sizemore's more extraordinary personalities, constantly at war."

The band shot a music video for the song with director Clive Richardson, another music video was filmed on the same set for the song "Red Light". Neither featured McGeoch as he was not an artist signed on Polydor yet.

"Christine" was released as a single on 30 May 1980. It peaked at number 22 in the UK Singles Chart.

== Cover versions ==
The song was covered by Red Hot Chili Peppers with John Frusciante on guitar at their V2001 Festival performance, and by Simple Minds on the deluxe edition of their Graffiti Soul album in 2009.

== Track listing ==
Side A
No.	Title	Length
1.	"Christine"	2:57

Side B
No.	Title	Length
1.	"Eve White / Eve Black"	3:04
