= Shadowtime =

Single by Siouxsie and the Banshees

from the album Superstition
- B-side: Spiral Twist; Sea of Light
- Released: 1 July 1991
- Recorded: 1991
- Genre: Pop rock; alternative rock
- Label: Polydor
- Songwriters: Siouxsie and the Banshees (Susan Ballion, Peter Edward Clarke and Steven Severin)
- Producer: Stephen Hague

Siouxsie and the Banshees singles chronology
"Kiss Them for Me" (1991)	"Shadowtime" (1991)	"Fear (of the Unknown)" (1991)

Music video
- "Shadowtime" on YouTube

"Shadowtime" is a song written and recorded by English rock band Siouxsie and the Banshees and produced by Stephen Hague. It was released in July 1991 by Polydor Records as the second single from the band's 10th studio album, Superstition (1991).

== Music and reception ==
The song is an up-tempo, pop-oriented tune that received moderate airplay on alternative rock radios in the US in 1991. "Shadowtime" was remixed slightly for its single version, giving it a fuller, synthesized sound and adding some background vocals by Siouxsie Sioux.

Bassist Steven Severin said that "Shadowtime" was a kind of tribute to Roxy Music's For Your Pleasure.

"Shadowtime" reached number 57 in the UK Singles Chart. In the United States, it spent six weeks on the Modern Rock Tracks chart, peaking at number 13 for the week of 12 October 1991.

== Charts ==
Chart (1991)	Peak position
Australia (ARIA)	148
UK Singles (OCC)	57
UK Airplay (Music Week)	34
US Modern Rock Tracks (Billboard)	13
