= The Killing Jar (song) =

Single by Siouxsie and the Banshees

from the album Peepshow
- B-side: "Something Wicked (This Way Comes)"; "Are You Still Dying Darling?"
- Released: September 1988
- Genre: Alternative rock
- Label: Polydor; Geffen (US)
- Songwriters: Susan Ballion; Peter Edward Clarke; Steven Severin
- Producers: Mike Hedges; Siouxsie and the Banshees

Siouxsie and the Banshees singles chronology
"Peek-a-Boo" (1988)	"The Killing Jar" (1988)	"The Last Beat of My Heart" (1988)

Music video
- "The Killing Jar" on YouTube

"The Killing Jar" is a song written, produced and recorded by English rock band Siouxsie and the Banshees. It was released in 1988 as the second single from the band's ninth studio album, Peepshow.

== Composition and reception ==
The song is an uptempo number which reflects the pop music direction Siouxsie and the Banshees were taking at the time. The track contains alternative rock elements and the band's trademark cryptic lyrical content. According to Siouxsie, the song was inspired by a technique used by butterfly collectors to retain the beauty of the animals. "The Killing Jar" was remixed slightly for its radio version, most notably in the song's introduction and percussion throughout. The single version of "The Killing Jar" was featured on the Banshees' 1992 compilation Twice Upon a Time: The Singles.

Following the American success of their previous single, "Peek-a-Boo", which reached No. 1 on the US Billboard Modern Rock Tracks chart, "The Killing Jar" nearly matched the feat, peaking at No. 2. The single also reached No. 41 on the UK Singles Chart.

== Charts ==
Chart (1988–1989)	Peak position
UK Singles (Official Charts)	41
US Dance Club Play (Billboard)	37
US Modern Rock Tracks (Billboard)	2
