= Cities in Dust =

Single by Siouxsie and the Banshees

from the album Tinderbox
- B-side: "An Execution", "The Quarterdrawing of the Dog"
- Released: October 18, 1985
- Recorded: September 1985
- Length: 4:06
- Label: Polydor; Geffen (US)
- Songwriters: Susan Ballion; Peter Edward Clarke; Steven Severin
- Producers: Siouxsie and the Banshees

Siouxsie and the Banshees singles chronology
"Overground" (1984)	"Cities in Dust" (1985)	"Candyman" (1986)

Music video
- "Cities In Dust" on YouTube

"Cities in Dust" is a song by English rock band Siouxsie and the Banshees from their album Tinderbox (1986). It was released on 18 October 1985 as the album's lead single.

== Background and composition ==
"Cities in Dust" is a dance-rock, and dance-pop song. The lyrics describe the city of Pompeii, destroyed by the volcanic eruption of Mount Vesuvius in 79 AD. Imagery describing the volcano and its magma chamber, the condition of the victims of the eruption, and the subsequent discovery and excavation of the city comprises the bulk of the lyrics. The lyrics mention a shrine to Lares Familiares.

== Release ==
"Cities in Dust" peaked at No. 21 on the UK Singles Chart in November 1985. In the US, Geffen released the single in early 1986 and included a remix of the song by Bob Rock on the A side of the vinyl and also on the 12 inch vinyl as an additional track. Although not Siouxsie and the Banshees' first song to enter the US Billboard Hot Dance/Disco chart, it was their first significant success, climbing to No. 17.

== Critical reception ==
Spin hailed the group for creating "this intoxicating wonderful commercial dance record without losing their edge". Reviewer John Leland said, "In a month of good dance rock records, this is the best", and noted that it was "full bodied, dense, with layers of chugging funk guitars, toy piano, and various electronic things". He concluded with praise for Siouxsie's performance: "It's rare these days to find a full production job that draws its identity from the voice". NME praised it as a "massively confident burst of pop", recapturing "the wondrous hypnotic pop of the Banshees' greatest singles era".

In 2011, singer Brett Anderson of Suede cited "Cities in Dust" as one of his favourite songs.

== Cover versions ==
Pato Fu recorded a version on their album Daqui Pro Futuro (2007). A cover by electronic artist Junkie XL was released as a single in 2008, and included on the Booming Back at You album, the soundtrack for the racing video game Burnout Paradise and the compilation album OMFGG – Original Music Featured on Gossip Girl No. 1.

A cover version by The Everlove was used in the trailers for the 2012 video game Transformers: Fall of Cybertron; that cover was also featured in a 2014 trailer for the fourth season of the HBO series Game of Thrones. In 2016, the Japanese goth rock band The Mortal, formed by BUCK-TICK frontman Atsushi Sakurai, covered the song in a Japanese re-written version for their EP Spirit in 2015. Garbage recorded a rendition of the song, for the vinyl EP Witness to Your Love, released in April 2023.

== In popular culture ==
Siouxsie and the Banshees are seen performing the song in the 1986 movie Out of Bounds, and the song appears on the soundtrack album. The song was featured in the 1997 film Grosse Pointe Blank, the 2017 spy film Atomic Blonde and its soundtrack, and the 2018 second season of the Netflix teen drama series 13 Reasons Why and its soundtrack.

The song has been used in two TV series produced by Amy Sherman-Palladino - episode four of the third season of Gilmore Girls and the final credits of episode nine of the second season of The Marvelous Mrs. Maisel. It also appears at the beginning of the eighth episode of the third season of Glow. Scenes from the promo video are seen in the Brazilian film Califórnia.

== Charts ==
Chart (1985)	Peak position
Ireland (IRMA)	22
Netherlands (Single Top 100)	37
UK Singles (Official Charts)	21
US Dance Club Songs (Billboard)	17
