= Peepshow (album) =

1988 studio album by Siouxsie and the Banshees

Studio album by Siouxsie and the Banshees
- Released: 5 September 1988
- Recorded: January–June 1988
- Studios: Marcus, London
- Genres: Alternative rock; folk rock
- Length: 42:41
- Labels: Polydor; Geffen (US)
- Producers: Mike Hedges; Siouxsie and the Banshees

Siouxsie and the Banshees chronology
Through the Looking Glass (1987)	Peepshow (1988)	Superstition (1991)

Siouxsie Sioux chronology
Through the Looking Glass (1987)	Peepshow (1988)	Boomerang; The Creatures (1989)

Singles from Peepshow
- 1. "Peek-a-Boo" Released: 18 July 1988; 2. "The Killing Jar" Released: 19 September 1988; 3. "The Last Beat of My Heart" Released: 21 November 1988

Peepshow is the ninth studio album by the English rock band Siouxsie and the Banshees, released in the United Kingdom on 5 September 1988 by Polydor Records. It was their first record as a quintet. With the arrival of multi-instrumentalist Martin McCarrick and guitarist Jon Klein, the group recorded a multifaceted album with a variety of influences. Peepshow included three singles "Peek-a-Boo", "The Killing Jar" and "The Last Beat of My Heart".

Upon release, the album was critically acclaimed: praise centred around the unpredictability of the orchestrations and new nuances in Siouxsie Sioux's voice. The record was a commercial success, peaking at No. 20 in the UK, and No. 68 on the US Billboard 200 chart in the week of 3 December 1988. It spent a total of 20 weeks on that chart. "Peek-a-Boo" became the band's first American hit and reached number 53 on the Billboard Hot 100 chart. "Peek-a-Boo" also reached number one on the Billboard Alternative Songs chart and "the Killing Jar" got the number two spot.

It is the subject of the 2018 book Peepshow by Samantha Bennett, part of the 33⅓ series.

== Music ==
Music journalist Parke Puterbaugh described "Peek-a-Boo" as a "collage of sound that incorporates a backward percussion track" with the voice bouncing from channel to channel. "The Killing Jar" opens with "a faint splash of reggae" and then the music dissolves into a trancelike drone in the style of Brian Eno. "Scarecrow" has a "Middle-Eastern feel" and the first side rushes to a climax in "Burn-Up", with cello and drums "simulating a train's mounting momentum". On "Rhapsody", Siouxsie Sioux sang in high register as a soprano.

== Release ==
The record was a commercial success, peaking at No. 20 in the UK, and No. 68 on the US Billboard 200 chart in the week of 3 December 1988. It spent a total of 20 weeks on that chart.

The lead single "Peek-a-Boo" reached number one on the Billboard Alternative Songs chart and "the Killing Jar" got the number two spot.

The album was remastered and reissued on CD with bonus tracks in October 2014. A 180g vinyl reissue, remastered from the original ¼” tapes and cut half-speed at Abbey Road Studios by Miles Showell, was released in December 2018.

== Critical reception ==
Professional ratings
Review scores
Source	Rating
AllMusic	4.5/5 stars
Q	5/5 stars
Record Mirror	4.5/5 stars

Upon release, the album was critically acclaimed. Q wrote in its 5 out of 5 star review: "Peepshow takes place in some distorted fairground of the mind where weird and wonderful shapes loom." Reviewer Mark Cooper hailed "Martin McCarrick's accordion that pokes its way into Peek A Boo ... a carny piece of musical imagination". He noted that "the rest of the record bursts with similar acts of imagination", saying: "full honours go to the aforementioned McCarrick for all manner of shrewd decorations and drummer Budgie for endlessly inventive rhythm work that manages to pinpoint the tension inherent in each song without ever lapsing into an obvious beat". Melody Maker highly praised its first single, "Peek-a-Boo", and called it "quite the most astounding British record" of 1988, and "a brightly unexpected mixture of black steel and pop disturbance." The paper also praised the band for the ballad "The Last Beat of My Heart". Chris Roberts said: "The infinite pinnacle is their one joint effort, the bravura hymn "The Last Beat of My Heart"". As Martin McCarrick's accordion and Budgie's directly intelligent rhythms underlie its pathos, this elegy is translated by Sioux with capital beatitude. It's the Banshees' most courageous arabesque in some time." Record Mirror also particularly enjoyed that song when reviewing the album: "The highlight is the restrained 'The Last Beat of My Heart', where Siouxsie's voice explores new ground as she caresses a haunting melody." Reviewer Kevin Murphy concluded by saying: "Brimming with confidence ..., Peepshow is the Banshees' finest hour." NME noted a change of approach in the musical direction: "Peepshow is the best Banshees record since A Kiss in the Dreamhouse because it's the Banshees deciding to be a pop band rather than a rock group".

In the US, Spin published a glowing review of the album in their November issue. Discussing "Peek-a-Boo", critic Tony Fletcher said that its "mood fell in perfectly with their beloved London's summer fascination with the sparsity and confusion that call Acid House, Psychedelic and how!" He described the music of "Peek-a-Boo" as "a crazed assortment of fairground accordions, abrupt horns, distant to-and-fro vocals-exotic, erotic, a dancefloor winner for sure and all of three minutes short." Fletcher also hailed the other tracks, noting "an almost lilting reggae feel to the beginning of "Killing Jar", a fragile, waif-like Siouxsie backed only by translucent guitar and a keyboard bass on the brief "Rawhead and Bloodybones", and a delightful, majestic ballad the likes of which it had been a safe assumption was beyond their reach on "The Last Beat of My Heart". [...] As Peepshow ends with the drawn-out "Rhapsody", Siouxsie's operatic flings seem to be a celebration of her reawakened capacity to thrill." Fletcher concluded: "She and the band sound as confident, abandoned and excited as when they started". In Stereo Review, the album was published in the column "Best of the Month". Reviewer Parke Puterbaugh wrote that the record was "a fascinating plunge into the subconscious" and was "Dream-like" and "hypnotic", further emphasizing, "Peepshow brims with nonlinear logic, compulsive rhythms, and icy, crystalline textures." The critic concluded his review, qualifying it as an "utterly unconventional and thoroughly intoxicating album" ... "a transcendent feat: They are not playing music, the music is playing them".

Peepshow was listed by Q magazine as one of the top 50 albums of 1988. The readers of Best music magazine rated it the 6th best album of the year.

=== Retrospective ===
AllMusic published a four-and-a-half -out-of-five-star review writing: "showcasing the band's [...] ability to always provide an accomplished variety of sound and approach while still recognizably maintaining a uniquely Banshees style -- Peepshow is the sound of a band reenergized". The 2004 edition of The Rolling Stone Album Guide gave Peepshow a rating of 2.5 stars out of five, saying that the album mixes "synthesizers and a lighter pop touch with the Banshees' trademark howl", but the combination "lacks spark". In contrast a 2014 review in The Daily Telegraph praised the record, saying that "lush, folk-rock orchestration produced perfect pop".

== Legacy ==
Bloc Party later praised "Peek-a-Boo", which their singer Kele Okereke described: "It sounded like nothing else on this planet. This is just a pop song [...], but to me it sounded like the most current but most futuristic bit of guitar-pop music I've heard." DeVotchKa later covered "The Last Beat of My Heart" at the suggestion of Arcade Fire singer Win Butler. Colin Meloy of The Decemberists also mentioned "The Last Beat of My Heart" as one of his favorite Siouxsie and the Banshees songs. Peepshow was also one of the albums Nic Offer of the band !!! ("Chk Chk Chk"), listened to the most during his formative years. Emel Mathlouthi recorded a rendition of "Rhapsody" as a one-off for French Television, saying that the lyrics were close to her.

== Track listing ==
All lyrics are written by Siouxsie Sioux, except where noted; all music is composed by Siouxsie and the Banshees.

Side one
No.	Title	Lyrics	Length
1.	"Peek-a-Boo"		3:12
2.	"The Killing Jar"	Steven Severin	4:04
3.	"Scarecrow"	Severin	5:06
4.	"Carousel"		4:26
5.	"Burn-Up"		4:32

Side two
No.	Title	Lyrics	Length
6.	"Ornaments of Gold"		3:50
7.	"Turn to Stone"	Severin	4:05
8.	"Rawhead and Bloodybones"		2:29
9.	"The Last Beat of My Heart"	Severin/Siouxsie	4:30
10.	"Rhapsody"	Severin	6:23

2014 CD remastered reissue bonus tracks
No.	Title	Lyrics	Length
11.	"El Dia De Los Muertos" (Espiritu Mix)	Siouxsie	5:36
12.	"The Killing Jar" (Lepidopteristic Mix)		8:06
13.	"The Last Beat of My Heart" (Live Seattle Lollapalooza, 1991)		5:32

== Personnel ==
Siouxsie and the Banshees

- Siouxsie Sioux – vocals
- Steven Severin – electric bass
- Budgie – drums, percussion and harmonica
- Martin McCarrick – cello, keyboards, accordion
- Jon Klein – guitar

Additional personnel

- Mike Hedges – producer, engineer

== Charts ==
Chart performance for Peepshow
Chart (1988)	Peak position
Canada Top Albums/CDs (RPM)	74
Dutch Albums (Album Top 100)	98
European Albums (Music & Media)	64
German Albums (Offizielle Top 100)	64
UK Albums (Official Charts)	20
US Billboard 200	68

== Certifications ==
Certifications for Peepshow
Region	Certification	Certified units/sales
United Kingdom (BPI)	Silver	60,000^{^}
^{^} Shipments figures based on certification alone.

== Bibliography ==
- Bennett, Samantha (October 2018). Siouxsie and the Banshees' Peepshow (33 1/3). Bloomsbury Publishing. ISBN 978-1501321863.
