= Kiss Them for Me (song) =

Single by Siouxsie and the Banshees

from the album Superstition
- B-side: "Staring Back"; "Return"
- Released: 13 May 1991
- Recorded: 1991
- Genre: Dance-pop; alternative pop
- Length: 4:37
- Label: Polydor; Geffen (US)
- Songwriters: Susan Ballion, Peter Edward Clarke, Martin McCarrick and Steven Severin
- Producer: Stephen Hague

Siouxsie and the Banshees singles chronology
"The Last Beat of My Heart" (1988)	"Kiss Them for Me" (1991)	"Shadowtime" (1991)

Music video
- "Kiss Them for Me" on YouTube

Siouxsie Sioux singles chronology
""Fury Eyes"; The Creatures" (1990)	"Kiss Them for Me" (1991)	""Shadowtime"; Siouxsie and the banshees" (1991)

"Kiss Them for Me" is a song written and recorded by English rock band Siouxsie and the Banshees. It was produced by Stephen Hague. It was released in 1991 as the first single from the band's 10th studio album, Superstition.

Upon its release, the single received enthusiastic reviews. "Kiss Them for Me" became their most successful single in the US peaking at number 23 in the Billboard Hot 100. Billboard also ranked it as the second most-played song of the year on American alternative music radio.

== Background and recording ==
The song presented a change in musical direction for Siouxsie and the Banshees, adopting a much more straightforward pop-oriented feel than previous post-punk and gothic rock efforts, due in part to Hague's production work. Siouxsie Sioux's cryptic lyrics were an ode to American actress Jayne Mansfield. The lyrics refer to Mansfield in several ways: her catchword "divoon" (a creative respelling of “divine”, indicating luxuriance); referring to her heart-shaped swimming pool and her love of champagne and parties; and to the car crash that killed her in 1967. Kiss Them for Me was a 1957 film starring Mansfield and Cary Grant.

A mid-tempo dance-pop track, it was influenced by South Asian music. Twenty-year old tabla player Talvin Singh took part in the sessions, and also sang during the bridge. This was first of Singh’s many collaborations with pop artists. The song's drum beat was taken from a Roland TR-909 drum machine beat that had previously been used on Schoolly D's 1985 single “P.S.K. What Does It Mean?"

== Critical reception ==
Melody Maker wrote a rave review, calling it "sublime", but noting that some listeners would be "horrified by its baggy backbeat and sheer unashamed danceability. It doesn't just groove, [...] It floats almost imperceptibly to its ecstatic climax, each sweet verse and saccharin chorus a tantalising hint of what's to come. And when it comes, by Christ your knees give way".

PopMatters retrospectively included it in their list of "The 20 Most Memorable Songs of 1991".

== Release ==
"Kiss Them for Me" was released on 13 May 1991, and was Siouxsie and the Banshees' biggest hit in the United States. It became their second and last entry on the Billboard Hot 100 and their first single to hit the top 40, peaking at No. 23 in the week of 19 October. It also became the band's second chart-topper on the U.S. Modern Rock Tracks chart, spending five weeks at No. 1 during the summer of 1991. "Kiss Them for Me" was the first Banshees song to hit the top 10 on the US US Hot Dance/Disco chart, peaking at No. 8. In the US it also spent several months on heavy rotation on MTV.

In the UK, "Kiss Them for Me" peaked at No. 32 in the UK Singles Chart, the band's 16th top 40 single. The "Snapper Mix" includes a spoken sample of Jayne Mansfield from the movie Will Success Spoil Rock Hunter?, while the "Kathak Mix", remixed by producer Youth, features spoken samples of Robert Anton Wilson in the introduction. In the UK, two different 12-inch records were released. The first included the "Snapper Mix" of "Kiss Them for Me" with the non-album B-sides "Staring Back" and "Return". The second version contained three different versions of "Kiss Them for Me" by Youth: the "Kathak Mix" on the A-side and the "Loveappella Mix" and "Ambient Mix" on the B-side.

In September 2023, for the 35th anniversary of Modern Rock Tracks (which by then had been renamed to Alternative Airplay), Billboard published a list of the top 100 most successful songs in the chart's history; "Kiss Them for Me" was ranked at number 54.

== Cover versions and legacy ==
The song was covered by Diane Birch, School of Seven Bells in 2010 and Anna Nalick in 2011. It was occasionally used as background music on the CBC Radio One program Q and was used in the Daria episode "Ill". "Kiss Them for Me" was the last song played on the MTV program 120 Minutes.

== Track listing ==
US CD maxi single (GEFDS-21650) on Geffen Records

1. "Kiss Them for Me (7" Version)" – 4:29
2. "Staring Back" – 3:16
3. "Return" – 5:02
4. "Kiss Them for Me (Kathak Mix)" – 8:56

Tracks 2 and 3 were produced by Siouxsie and the Banshees and engineered by Charles Gray

UK 7" vinyl single (SHE 19) on Polydor Records

1. "Kiss Them for Me" – 4:29
2. "Return" – 5:02

EU 12" vinyl single (SHEX 19) on Polydor Records

1. "Kiss Them For Me (Snapper Mix)" – 6:21
2. "Staring Back" – 3:16
3. "Return" – 5:02

UK 12" vinyl single (SHEXR 19) on Polydor Records

1. "Kiss Them For Me (Kathak Mix)" – 8:56
2. "Kiss Them For Me (Loveappella Mix)" – 4:00
3. "Kiss Them For Me (Ambient Mix)" – 5:20

UK CD single (SHECD 19) on Polydor Records

1. "Kiss Them for Me (7" Version)" – 4:29
2. "Kiss Them For Me (12" Snapper Mix Version)" – 6:21
3. "Staring Back" – 3:16
4. "Return" – 5:02

== Charts ==
=== Weekly charts ===
Weekly chart performance for "Kiss Them for Me"
Chart (1991)	Peak position
Australia (ARIA)	40
UK Singles (Official Charts)	32
US Billboard Hot 100	23
US Alternative Airplay (Billboard)	1
US Dance Club Songs (Billboard)	8
US Dance Singles Sales (Billboard)	19

=== Year-end charts ===
Year-end chart performance for "Kiss Them for Me"
Chart (1991)	Position
US Alternative Airplay (Billboard)	2

== See also ==
- Number one modern rock hits of 1991
