= Happy House =

Single by Siouxsie and the Banshees

from the album Kaleidoscope
- B-side: "Drop Dead/Celebration"
- Released: 7 March 1980
- Recorded: 1980
- Genre: Post-punk
- Length: 3:48
- Label: Polydor
- Songwriters: Siouxsie Sioux, Steven Severin
- Producers: Nigel Gray; Siouxsie and the Banshees

Siouxsie and the Banshees singles chronology
"Mittageisen" (1979)	"Happy House" (1980)	"Christine" (1980)

Music video
- "Happy House" in 4:3 aspect ratio on Dailymotion

Music video
- "Happy House" in 16:9 aspect ratio on YouTube

"Happy House" is a song written by Siouxsie Sioux and Steven Severin and recorded by their band Siouxsie and the Banshees. It was released as a single in March 1980 by record label Polydor, then later included on the band's third album, Kaleidoscope. "Happy House" was the group's first record made with guitarist John McGeoch and drummer Budgie.

== Background and recording ==
"Happy House" marked a change in musical direction for Siouxsie and the Banshees due to the arrival of two new musicians: drummer Budgie, previously of the Slits, and guitarist John McGeoch, though still a member of Magazine at this time.

Budgie, who was interested in African polyrhythms, used a reggae vibe on the song, while McGeoch played both atmospheric and edgy guitars. Siouxsie stated that the band almost invented a new sound with this single: It was "Banshees – phase two".

When asked if "Happy House" was a cynical song, Siouxsie replied: "It is sarcastic. In a way, like television, all the media, it is like adverts, the perfect family whereas it is more common that husbands beat their wives. There are mental families really but the projection is everyone smiling, blond hair, sunshine, eating butter without being fat and everyone perfect".

== Release ==
"Happy House" was released on 7 March 1980 by record label Polydor as the first single from the band's third studio album, Kaleidoscope. The single became the band's second top 20 hit, peaking at number 17 in the UK Singles Chart.

== Music video ==
The video is set in a studio "cartoon house" made to look "fun and happy", reflecting the sarcastic lyrics. Siouxsie explores the house, dressed in a Harlequin outfit while the band supports her, playing their instruments in the living room. Despite the very distinctive guitar riff (played by McGeoch) that is arguably the centrepiece of the song, McGeoch does not feature in the video. Instead Siouxsie occasionally mimics playing the riff with a ukulele, with Severin on bass and Budgie on drums playing along in the background.

== Legacy ==
The song was later used or sampled by several acts. The Italian dance act Cappella had a hit single in 1993 with the Eurodance song "U Got 2 Know", which used the distinctive riff from "Happy House". In 2000, electronic rock band Mindless Self Indulgence sampled the opening riff on their single "Bitches", from the album Frankenstein Girls Will Seem Strangely Sexy. In 2011, the Weeknd sampled several elements of the original version in his song "House of Balloons" from the mixtape album of the same name. When he performed at the Super Bowl halftime show in February 2021, the Weeknd included "House of Balloons" in his setlist, doing "eerie military marches to a Siouxsie and the Banshees sample". It featured in the 2021 film Last Night in Soho in a Halloween party scene, and appears on the film's soundtrack.
