= Peek-a-Boo (Siouxsie and the Banshees song) =

1988 single by Siouxsie and the Banshees

Single by Siouxsie and the Banshees

from the album Peepshow
- B-side: "False Face"; "Catwalk"
- Released: 18 July 1988
- Genre: Dance-rock, alternative rock
- Length: 3:10
- Label: Polydor; Geffen
- Songwriters: Susan Ballion; Peter Edward Clarke; Steven Severin; Harry Warren; Johnny Mercer
- Producers: Mike Hedges; Siouxsie and the Banshees

Siouxsie and the Banshees singles chronology
"Song from the Edge of the World" (1987)	"Peek-a-Boo" (1988)	"The Killing Jar" (1988)

Music video
- "Peek-a-Boo" on YouTube

"Peek-a-Boo" is a song by the English rock band Siouxsie and the Banshees, released in July 1988. It was the first single from their 1988 album Peepshow. It peaked at number 16 in the UK Singles chart. In the United States, "Peek-a-Boo" became Siouxsie and the Banshees' first single to appear on the Billboard Hot 100, ultimately peaking at number 53.

It has been praised by critics and PopMatters rated it at number 18 of their "The 100 Greatest Alternative Singles of the '80s" list.

== Background, recording, music and release ==
The song's peculiar sound is due to its experimental recording which was based on a sample. The song was built on a loop in reverse of a brass part with drums which the group previously arranged a year before for a cover of John Cale's "Gun". The band selected different parts of that tape when played backwards, editing them and re-recording on top of it, adding a different melody plus accordion, a one-note bass and jarring guitar. Drummer Budgie also added another beat. Once the instrumental parts were finished, Siouxsie sang her lyrics over it. The lyric track was further manipulated by Siouxsie's use of a different microphone for each line of the song. It took the band a year to arrive at this result. When initially composed to be an extra track for 1987's "The Passenger" single, the band realized that the song was too good to be relegated to B-side status and deserved better exposure. The song was described as "quirky dance-rock".

"Peek-a-Boo" was one of Siouxsie and the Banshees' most recognisable and popular singles; it was also the group's first to chart in the US Billboard Hot 100, reaching the No. 53 in the week of 3 December. The song was very popular on alternative rock radio and received heavy play on MTV. In September 1988, Billboard magazine premiered a new Modern Rock Tracks chart, which measured radio airplay on US modern rock stations; "Peek-a-Boo" was the chart's first No. 1 song. In the UK, "Peek-a-Boo" became their fifth Top 20 UK hit, peaking at No. 16 on the UK Singles Chart. In Canada, the song reached No. 29 on the RPM Retail Sales chart.

A minor controversy ensued after the single's release, as the lines to the chorus ("...Golly jeepers/Where'd you get those weepers?/Peepshow, creepshow/Where did you get those eyes?...") were found to be too similar to the lyrics in the 1938 song "Jeepers Creepers". To remedy the situation and to avoid legal action, the band gave co-songwriting credit on "Peek-a-Boo" to Harry Warren and Johnny Mercer.

== Critical reception ==
Melody Maker described the song as "a brightly unexpected mixture of black steel and pop disturbance" and qualified its genre as "thirties hip hop". "Peek-a-Boo" was rated "Single of the Week" in both Sounds and NME. Sounds wrote that it was a "brave move", "playful and mysterious". NME described it as "oriental marching band hip hop" with "catchy accordion." They concluded: "If this nation was served by anything approaching a decent pop radio station, 'Peek A Boo' would be a huge hit."

PopMatters retrospectively placed it at No. 18 on their list "The 100 Greatest Alternative Singles of the '80s", saying that its instrumentation was "inventive" with "ingenious vocal phasing".

== Legacy ==
Bloc Party praised "Peek-a-Boo" and their singer Kele Okereke said: "It sounded like nothing else on this planet. [...] to me it sounded like the most current but most futuristic bit of guitar-pop music I've heard."

Rap artist Sir Mix-a-Lot used elements of the song's themes about sex work for the track "The (Peek-a-Boo) Game" on his second studio album Seminar (1989); while initial pressings featured actual samples from the song, repressings removed the samples.

"Peek-a-Boo" was covered in 2010 by the Australian indie rock singer Bertie Blackman. The song was made available as downloadable content for the Rock Band platform on 20 April 2010. A cover version of the song by Echo 3 was used in the horror film Jeepers Creepers (2001). The music video was watched and commented on by Beavis and Butt-Head.

== Charts ==
Chart (1988)	Peak position
Canada Retail Singles (RPM)	29
Europe (Eurochart Hot 100)	54
Ireland (IRMA)	18
UK Singles (Official Charts)	16
US Billboard Hot 100	53
US 12-inch Singles Sales (Billboard)	26
US Dance Club Play (Billboard)	14
US Modern Rock Tracks (Billboard)	1

== See also ==
- List of Billboard Modern Rock Tracks number ones of the 1980s
