= The Creatures discography =

Band discography

- Studio albums: 4
- Extended plays: 2
- Live albums: 3
- Compilation albums: 3
- Singles: 8
- Music videos: 9
- Exclusive releases: 8

The discography of the Creatures, an English alternative band formed by Siouxsie Sioux and Budgie, consists of four studio albums, three live albums, three compilation albums, two extended plays and eight singles. This page lists albums, singles and compilations by the Creatures, alongside their chart positions and release dates in the United Kingdom.

Their back catalogue has long been out of print physically. The compilation CD A Bestiary Of (which reunites all their early material recorded between 1981 and 1983) is available on all the digital platforms. Their second album Boomerang is available on iTunes and other media players whereas their third and fourth albums released on Sioux Records are not available on any official digital platform except Spotify.

== Albums ==
=== Studio albums ===
List of studio albums, with selected details and chart positions
Title	Album details	Peak chart positions		
Title	Album details	UK	NZ	US
Feast	Released: 20 May 1983; Label: Polydor	17	28	—
Boomerang	Released: 6 November 1989; Label: Polydor, Geffen	—	—	197
Anima Animus	Released: 15 February 1999; Label: Sioux Records, Instinct Records	79	—	—
Hái!	Released: 20 October 2003; Label: Sioux Records, Instinct Records	153	—	—

=== Live albums ===
List of live albums, with selected details
Title	Album details
Zulu	CD available only via website, recorded live on 12 September 1998 at University of London. Includes: "Turn It On", "Take Mine", "Tattoo", "Pluto Drive", "Miss the Girl", "Guillotine", "I Was Me", "B-Side Ourselves", "Exterminating Angel", "The Vamp/Witchcraft/Standing There", "Killing Time", "Right Now", "The Passenger"; First live album (limited edition of 3,000 copies with box set, postcards, stamps and badges); Released: 6 July 1999; Label: Sioux Records
Sequins in the Sun	CD available only via website, recorded live on 26 June 1999 at the Glastonbury festival. Includes: "All She Could Ask For", "Disconnected", "Turn It On", "Take Mine", "Pinned Down", "Guillotine", "2nd Floor", "Pluto Drive/Nightclubbing", "Prettiest Thing", "Exterminating Angel"; Second live album (limited edition of 3,000 copies with postcards), [(and also) on a numbered jewel case version released in Germany]; Released: October 2000; Label: Sioux Records
Utrecht Tivoli 06/03/90	CD available only via website, recorded live on 3 March 1990 at the Tivoli in Utrecht. Includes: "Thumb", "Standing There", "Manchild", "You!", "Untiedundone", "Fury Eyes", "But Not Them", "Mad Eyed Screamer", "Willow", "Pity", "Miss the Girl", "Venus Sands", "Strolling Wolf", "Simoom", "Pluto Drive", "A Strutting Rooster", "So Unreal", "Right Now", "Sky Train"; Third live album (limited edition of 3,000 copies with box set, postcards and badges); Released: 20 February 2006; Label: Sioux Records

=== Compilation albums ===
List of compilation albums, with selected details
Title	Album details
A Bestiary Of	Released: 27 October 1997; Label: Polydor/PolyGram
Hybrids	Released: 2 November 1999; Label: Sioux Records, Instinct Records
U.S. Retrace	Released: 9 May 2000; Label: Sioux Records, Instinct Records

== Extended plays ==
List of extended plays, with selected details and chart positions
Title	EP details	Peak positions
Title	EP details	UK
Wild Things	Released: 29 September 1981; Label: Polydor	24
Eraser Cut	Released: 3 August 1998; Label: Sioux Records	—

== Singles ==
List of singles, with selected chart positions
Year	Single	Peak chart positions		Album
Year	Single	UK	US Alt.	Album
1983	"Miss the Girl"	21	—	Feast
1983	"Right Now"	14	—	Non-album song
1989	"Standing There"	53	4	Boomerang
1990	"Fury Eyes"	81	12	Boomerang
1998	"2nd Floor"	93	—	Anima Animus
1999	"Say"	72	—	Anima Animus
1999	"Prettiest Thing"	87	—	Anima Animus
2003	"Godzilla!"	53	—	Hái!

== Other appearances ==
Year	Track	Album
1998	"I'm Here... Another Planet (Juno Reactor Mix)"	Lost in Space (Original Motion Picture Soundtrack)

== Exclusive releases ==
From 1998 through 2001, the Creatures rewarded members of their official fan club, Gifthorse, with special releases featuring exclusive content, such as recordings of Christmas songs, original material and live content. Other special releases were made available in limited quantities directly on their website, the last one being Hái! (Náma) in 2004.

Year	Release details
1998	"Sad Cunt" "Sad Cunt (Chix 'N' Dix Mix)" "2nd Floor (Siouxsie, Budgie and Warne's Club Mix)" (only on the CD single version): 7" single (3000 copies), and later on CD (2000 copies).; Released: May 1998 (single) 2000 (CD single); Label: Sioux Records
1999	"Exterminating Angel (4 Obscure Objects of Desire) " "Exordium (One Night in France)" "Interim (NYC & Paris)" "Remake (The James Hardway)" "Remodel (From the Album Anima Animus)": Limited edition CD single, initial copies available in hand-painted version signed by Siouxsie and Budgie, second edition with normal sleeve (1,000 copies each); Released: February 1999; Label: Sioux Records
1999	Something Old Something New Something Borrowed Now Buy Zulu: Limited edition three-track CD recorded live in September 1998 in London (2,000 copies) Includes: "But Not Them", "Pinned Down" and "Venus in Furs"; Released: 12 April 1999; Label: Sioux Records
2000	"Take Mine"/"Sad Cunt": 7" inch single; Released: 19 June 2000; Label: Sub Pop
2000	"Murdering Mouth (Live)"; Live version recorded in September 1998 in London: First one-track CD single (2,000 copies). Gifthorse fan club issue.; Released: 2000; Label: Sioux Records
2000	"Rocket Ship": Second one-track CD single (2,000 copies). Gifthorse fan club issue.; Released: 2000; Label: Sioux Records
2001	"Red Wrapping Paper"; A Christmas song composed by Siouxsie and Budgie: Third one-track CD single (2,000 copies). Gifthorse fan club issue.; Released: December 2001; Label: Sioux Records
2004	Hái! (Náma); The unedited drum sessions of Budgie with Leonard Eto recorded in Tokyo for Hái! in 2002: Limited edition CD (3,000 copies); Released: July 2004; Label: Sioux Records
2004	"Attack of the Super Vixens"; Single titled An Evening with Siouxsie Tour 2004 featuring "Attack of the Super Vixens" on a-side with an etched b-side.: Limited edition 7" inch single; Released: September 2004; Label: Sioux Records

== Music videos ==
List of music videos, showing year released and directors
Title	Year	Director(s)
"Mad Eyed Screamer"	1981	Clive Richardson
"Miss the Girl"	1983	Tim Pope
"Right Now"	1983	Tim Pope
"Standing There"	1989	Peter Scammel
"Fury Eyes"	1990	Peter Scammel
"2nd Floor"	1998	Victor Boullet
"Say"	1999	Mike Olley
"Prettiest Thing"	1999	unknown
"Godzilla!"	2003	unknown
