= Dreamshow =

Video by Siouxsie
- Released: 13 September 2005 (UK); 3 April 2007 (U.S.)
- Recorded: October 2004
- Genre: Alternative rock
- Length: 143 minutes
- Label: Rhino/WEA

Siouxsie chronology
Dreamshow (2005)	Finale: The Last Mantaray & More Show (2009)

Dreamshow is a live DVD by Siouxsie, released in 2005. It was filmed at the Royal Festival Hall in London on 16 October 2004. The songs are performed on stage with the Millennia Ensemble orchestra. The setlist incorporates music from her bands Siouxsie and the Banshees and the Creatures.

Budgie, drummer and composer in the two bands, was the musical director on this tour; he re-orchestrated the songs with Siouxsie. As stated in the interviews present in the bonus of the DVD, this concert represents a musical achievement for Siouxsie and Budgie as they had always wanted to perform on stage with Leonard Eto, a Japanese Taiko drummer previously of the Kodo Drummers. Siouxsie added that this show was a dream come true as they also played with a fifteen-piece orchestra including two percussionists, a brass section and a string section. Budgie concluded the interview stating that the collaboration with Eto and an orchestra, was two dreams over two nights: "it can't be better than that". This was the last time he played with Siouxsie as the couple would split up in 2006.

Upon its release, the DVD was a commercial success reaching the number one position on the UK music DVD chart.

== Track listing ==
1. "Say Yes!" (from The Creatures' Hái!)
2. "Around the World" (from The Creatures' Hái!)
3. "Seven Tears" (from The Creatures' Hái!)
4. "Godzilla!" (from The Creatures' Hái!)
5. "Standing There" (from The Creatures' Boomerang)
6. "Miss the Girl" (from The Creatures' A Bestiary Of)
7. "Dear Prudence" (from Siouxsie and the Banshees' The Best of)
8. "Christine" (from Siouxsie and the Banshees' Kaleidoscope)
9. "Killing Time" (from The Creatures' Boomerang)
10. "Obsession" (from Siouxsie and the Banshees' A Kiss in the Dreamhouse)
11. "Shooting Sun" (from Siouxsie and the Banshees' Downside Up)
12. "Kiss Them for Me" (from Siouxsie and the Banshees' Superstition)
13. "The Rapture" (from Siouxsie and the Banshees' The Rapture)
14. "But Not Them" (from The Creatures' A Bestiary Of)
15. "Weathercade" (from The Creatures' A Bestiary Of)
16. "Prettiest Thing" (from The Creatures' Anima Animus)
17. "Take Mine" (from The Creatures' Anima Animus)
18. "Pinned Down" (from The Creatures' Eraser Cut)
19. "Trust in Me" (from Siouxsie and the Banshees' Through the Looking Glass)
20. "Another Planet" (from The Creatures' Anima Animus)
21. "2nd Floor" (from The Creatures' Anima Animus)
22. "Happy House" (from Siouxsie and the Banshees' Kaleidoscope)
23. "Not Forgotten" (from Siouxsie and the Banshees' The Rapture)
24. "Face to Face" (from Siouxsie and the Banshees' The Best of)
25. "Cities in Dust" (from Siouxsie and the Banshees' Tinderbox)
26. "Spellbound" (from Siouxsie and the Banshees' Juju)
27. "Peek-a-Boo" (from Siouxsie and the Banshees' Peepshow)

== Bonus ==
- "Hong Kong Garden" and four other songs performed at the "100 club" in London two weeks before the Dreamshows.
- Rehearsals at the Depot
- Soundchecks featuring "Further Nearer"
- interviews with Siouxsie and Budgie

== Band ==
- Voice: Siouxsie
- Drums: Budgie
- Japanese Taiko Drums: Leonard Eto
- Guitars: Knox Chandler
- Keyboards: Kristopher Pooley
- Backing vocals: Ananda and Rehana Ellis
- Strings, brass and percussion: The Millenia Ensemble°
- Cello on "The Rapture" and "Not Forgotten", accordion on "Peek-a-Boo": Martin McCarrick

°Arranged by conductor Sally Herbert

=== Sound ===
Mixed by William Shapland, except bonus tracks by Monty Lee Wilke

=== Film Production ===
Produced by Sophie Coolbaugh for Demon Music Group (Demon Vision label).
