= Hybrids (album) =

Remix album by The Creatures
- Released: 2 November 1999
- Studio: France; England
- Genre: Alternative
- Label: Sioux Records, Hydrogen Dukebox, Instinct Records (US)
- Producer: The Creatures, Steve Lyon, Warne Livesey

The Creatures chronology
Anima Animus (1999)	Hybrids (1999)	U.S. Retrace (2000)

Hybrids is a 1999 remix album by the Creatures (a.k.a. singer Siouxsie Sioux and percussionist Budgie). The tracks included are remixes of their songs released between 1998 and early 1999.

Most of the songs are extended mixes. Several mixes had been previously issued on 12" promo singles and CD singles, but most of them were previously unreleased. Hybrids was released on both double-LP vinyl and CD. The album was also released on Spotify.

The Independent on Sunday noted that all the remixes were created by other artists: "This is the pick of a crop that includes Howie B., Witchman and the Beloved, plus newer artists such as Icarus or Dr Psyche. While there are some chunky beats and catchy loops, it's better suited to home listening rather than the dancefloor".

Q's Victoria Segal said: "So Howie B takes a knife to the sexually watchful 'Prettiest Thing'; Black Dog unbolt the beats of 'Guillotine' into disjunctive abstraction, and Witchman has his evil way with 'Say'. Twice. Running its finger along the cutting edge, Hybrids is a bravely bloody genetic experiment."

== Track listing ==
=== UK CD (Duke D66 CDL) and US CD (INS-433-2) ===
1. "Prettiest Thing (Hormonal Mix)" by Howie B.
2. "Exterminating Angel (Nu Skool Mix)" by Dr Psyche
3. "Slipping Away (Tick Tock Mix)" by Chamber
4. "Say (Radio Friendly Mix)" by Witchman
5. "Pinned Down (By Icarus)"
6. "Guillotine (Bitten by the Black Dog)"
7. "All She Could Ask For (Dope mix)" by Justice & Endemic Void
8. "2nd Floor (Strawberry Cocktail Mix)" by Vito Bonito
9. "Disconnected (Beloved in a Void)" by the Beloved
10. "Turn It On (Black Smoker Mix)" by Omnivore
11. "Say (4 × 4 Mix)" by Witchman
12. "Prettiest Thing (Waking Dream Mix)" by Superchumbo

=== LP ===
1. "Disconnected (Beloved in a Void)"
2. "Exterminating Angel (Nu Skool Mix)"
3. "Slipping Away (Tick Tock Mix)"
4. "All She Could Ask For (Justice & Endemic's Void Dope Remix)"
5. "Pinned Down (By Icarus)"
6. "Guillotine (Bitten by the Black Dog)"
7. "Say (Very Long Mix)"
8. "Turn It On (Black Smoker Mix)"
