= Nocturne (Siouxsie and the Banshees album) =

Live album by Siouxsie and the Banshees
- Released: 25 November 1983
- Recorded: 30 September and 1 October 1983
- Venue: Royal Albert Hall, London
- Genre: Post-punk
- Length: 76:47
- Label: Polydor
- Producer: Siouxsie and the Banshees, Mike Hedges

Siouxsie and the Banshees live chronology
| Nocturne (1983) | Seven Year Itch (2003) |

Siouxsie and the Banshees chronology
| A Kiss in the Dreamhouse (1982) | Nocturne (1983) | Hyæna (1984) |

Nocturne is a live double album and video by English rock band Siouxsie and the Banshees, released on 25 November 1983 by Polydor Records. Co-produced by Mike Hedges, Nocturne features performances recorded at two shows at the Royal Albert Hall in London, on 30 September and 1 October 1983, featuring Robert Smith (of the Cure) on guitar.

Most of the material is from 1981's Juju and 1982's A Kiss in the Dreamhouse. It also features a few B-sides ("Pulled to Bits" and "Eve White/Eve Black") as well as a live version of the Beatles' "Dear Prudence", a song the Banshees had recorded in the studio in Stockholm earlier that year and issued as a single in September.

The music heard in the introduction before "Israel" is an excerpt from The Rite of Spring, composed in 1913 by Igor Stravinsky.

== Background and release ==
The Banshees had already performed live with Robert Smith on guitar in September and October 1979, when he and his band the Cure served as tour support for the Banshees. A friendship had started at the time between the members of the Cure and the Banshees. In late 1982, when guitarist John McGeoch left the Banshees prior to the A Kiss in the Dreamhouse tour, Steven Severin asked Smith to join them for the British and European tour. In 1983, the band toured in Japan for the second time in less than a year and also visited Australia and New Zealand. With the September 1983 release of the "Dear Prudence" single, Smith became an official member of the Banshees; a few weeks later, they recorded Nocturne in London.

The album was released in late November 1983. A video version of Nocturne was released on VHS the same year and was remastered for a DVD reissue in 2006. DVD bonus features included the Play at Home TV special from 1983, the "Dear Prudence" music video and performances from The Old Grey Whistle Test. The album was remastered for a cd reissue in 2009. In 2024, it was reissued on double vinyl with a different artwork for Record Store Day.

== Critical reception ==
Professional ratings
Review scores
| Source | Rating |
|---|---|
| AllMusic | 3/5 stars |

David Cleary of AllMusic retrospectively said that Nocturne "serves as an excellent, no-nonsense introduction to the band's music for neophytes, while fans of the group will appreciate the tight, gutsy, stripped-down performances", also describing it as "top-notch". In 2013, the album was included in The Quietus' list of its writers' 40 favourite live albums. Julian Marszalek wrote: "Nocturne stands as both a representation of where they were at that point in their career and their status as an incredible live band. Be it Budgie's precise and muscular rhythms, Steven Severin's flanged bass, Siouxsie's commanding presence or Robert Smith's interpretation of other guitarists' material, the performance is magnificent and convincing throughout. By cherry picking their finest material, Nocturne was – and still is – a kind of alternate Greatest Hits that acts as a gateway to their kaleidoscopic world". Total Guitar wrote that "Nocturne successfully reproduces the sound of the Banshees at their creative peak aided by then touring guitarist Robert Smith, who adds lysergic colour to the shimmering Melt! and a muscular rendition of Nighshift".

== Legacy ==
Steve Mason of the Beta Band listed Nocturne as one of his 14 favourite albums. He praised the guitars and the drums on the record: "Robert Smith's live playing on this is [...] superb. It's psychedelic [...], the sounds that he gets are unbelievable – I've never heard anyone get those sounds out of a guitar. [...] Budgie's drumming on this record is incredible. He's solid as a rock but really inventive and really tribal in places". Mason considered that "As a Banshees compilation album, it's a brilliant selection of what they've done". He explained he ended up sampling "a massive chunk" of Smith's guitar playing on "Painted Bird" for the Beta Band, and their song "Liquid Bird" – on their album Heroes to Zeros.

"Pulled to Bits" was covered by the Mars Volta as the flip side of their 2008 single "Wax Simulacra".

== Track listing ==
All songs by Siouxsie and the Banshees except 3, 11, and 15 by Siouxsie Sioux and Steven Severin and 2 and 14 by Lennon–McCartney.

1. "Israel" (6:45) (Single)
2. "Dear Prudence" (3:55) (Single)
3. "Paradise Place" (4:28) (from Kaleidoscope)
4. "Melt!" (3:48) (from A Kiss in the Dreamhouse)
5. "Cascade" (4:35) (from A Kiss in the Dreamhouse)
6. "Pulled to Bits" (4:03) (the b-side of "Playground Twist")
7. "Night Shift" (6:27) (from Juju)
8. "Sin in My Heart" (3:31) (from Juju)
9. "Slowdive" (4:18) (from A Kiss in the Dreamhouse)
10. "Painted Bird" (3:56) (from A Kiss in the Dreamhouse)
11. "Happy House" (4:39) (from Kaleidoscope)
12. "Switch" (6:35) (from The Scream)
13. "Spellbound" (4:31) (from Juju)
14. "Helter Skelter" (3:42) (from The Scream)
15. "Eve White/Eve Black" (2:48) (the b-side of "Christine")
16. "Voodoo Dolly" (8:42) (from Juju)

== DVD ==
1. "Israel"
2. "Cascade"
3. "Melt!"
4. "Pulled to Bits"
5. "Night Shift"
6. "Sin in My Heart"
7. "Painted Bird"
8. "Switch"
9. "Eve White/Eve Black"
10. "Voodoo Dolly"
11. "Spellbound"
12. "Helter Skelter"

=== DVD Bonus ===
1. Bonus 1: Play at Home (a 45-minute show broadcast on Channel 4, also featuring the Creatures and the Glove)
2. Bonus 2: Old Grey Whistle Test
3. Bonus 3: "Dear Prudence" (promotional film)

== Personnel ==
Siouxsie and the Banshees

- Siouxsie Sioux - vocals, guitar on "Sin in My Heart" and "Paradise Place"
- Steven Severin - bass guitar
- Budgie - drums, percussion
- Robert Smith - guitar

Technical

- Mike Hedges - producer
- Siouxsie and the Banshees - producers
- Paul Crowder, Tim Summerhayes - recording
- Chris Ludwinski - tape operator
- Da Gama, Siouxsie and the Banshees - design

== Charts ==
Chart performance for Nocturne
| Chart (1983–1984) | Peak position |
|---|---|
| New Zealand Albums (RMNZ) | 35 |
| UK Albums (Official Charts) | 29 |

== Certifications ==
Certifications for Nocturne
| Region | Certification | Certified units/sales |
|---|---|---|
| United Kingdom (BPI) | Silver | 60,000^{^} |
^{^} Shipments figures based on certification alone.
