= Fireworks (Siouxsie and the Banshees song) =

Single by Siouxsie and the Banshees
- B-side: "Coal Mind", "We Fall"
- Released: 21 May 1982
- Recorded: 1982
- Genre: Post-punk art rock
- Label: Polydor
- Songwriters: Susan Ballion, Peter Edward Clarke, John McGeoch and Steven Severin
- Producers: Siouxsie and the Banshees

Siouxsie and the Banshees singles chronology
"Arabian Knights" (1981)	"Fireworks" (1982)	"Slowdive" (1982)

Music video
- "Fireworks" on YouTube

"Fireworks" is a song by British post-punk band Siouxsie and the Banshees, released as a stand-alone single in 1982 by record label Polydor in between the albums Juju (1981) and A Kiss in the Dreamhouse (1982).

== History and release ==
"Fireworks" was released on 21 May 1982 by Polydor Records. It peaked at number 22 in the UK Singles Chart. Recorded in spring 1982, it was the first collaboration of the group with sound engineer Mike Hedges, who would become their co-producer on several records. Hedges had previously worked with Siouxsie and Budgie on the Creatures' debut EP, 1981's Wild Things. "Fireworks" was the first song for which the group incorporated strings arrangements.

The single was the opening track of the 1992 compilation Twice Upon a Time - The Singles and also appeared on the 2009 remastered version of A Kiss in the Dreamhouse. An early studio version produced by Nigel Gray, was included in the bonus tracks of the remastered CD version of Juju.

== Track listing ==
7"

Side A
No.	Title	Length
1.	"Fireworks"	3:37

Side B
No.	Title	Length
1.	"Coal Mind"	3:39

12"

Side A
No.	Title	Length
1.	"Fireworks"	4:33

Side B
No.	Title	Length
1.	"Coal Mind"	3:39
2.	"We Fall"	3:32
