= Hyæna =

1984 studio album by Siouxsie and the Banshees

Studio album by Siouxsie and the Banshees
- Released: 8 June 1984
- Recorded: June 1983 – February 1984
- Studios: Europa Film, Stockholm; Angel, London; Eel Pie, London; Power Plant, London
- Genres: Post-punk; neo psychedelia; art pop
- Length: 44:15
- Labels: Polydor; Geffen (US)
- Producers: Siouxsie and the Banshees; Mike Hedges

Siouxsie and the Banshees chronology
Nocturne (1983)	Hyæna (1984)	The Thorn (1984)

Siouxsie Sioux chronology
Feast; The Creatures (1983)	Hyæna (1984)	The Thorn (1984)

Singles from Hyæna
- 1. "Swimming Horses" Released: 16 March 1984; 2. "Dazzle" Released: 25 May 1984

Hyæna is the sixth studio album by the English rock band Siouxsie and the Banshees, released on 8 June 1984 by Polydor Records. The opening track, "Dazzle", featured strings played by musicians of the London Symphonic Orchestra (LSO), a 27-piece orchestra called the "Chandos Players"; it was scored from a tune that Siouxsie Sioux had composed on piano. Hyæna is the only studio album that guitarist Robert Smith of the Cure composed and recorded with Siouxsie and the Banshees.

In the United States, Hyæna was the first Banshees studio album to be released on Geffen Records, which also signed to reissue the rest of the band's catalogue. Before that, "Dear Prudence" had become the band's highest-peaking single in the UK, reaching number 3 in September of the previous year. The song, initially released as a stand-alone single in Europe, was issued in North America in May 1984. Consequently, it was finally added to the track listing of the US album version. Hyæna was the first Siouxsie and the Banshees album to enter the Billboard 200 in the US.

Hyæna was reissued on CD in a remastered, expanded edition in 2009. A 180-gram vinyl reissue of the album, remastered from the original 1/4-inch tapes and cut half-speed at Abbey Road Studios by Miles Showell, was released in December 2018.

== Critical reception and legacy ==
Professional ratings
Review scores
Source	Rating
AllMusic	4.5/5 stars
Record Mirror	4/5 stars

Upon release, Melody Maker wrote a favourable review: "Parts of it are so wistfully carefree that it's impossible not to credit Robert Smith as the talisman – his irreverence seems to course through everything. 'Take Me Back' is the Banshees rollicking like some primitive jazz combo drunk on the Good Lord's wine. On 'Belladonna', Smith's liquid guitar relaxes Sioux to the extent that she drops a few masks to reveal her vulnerability. When the siren sings 'daylight devours your unguarded hours', she's illuminating her own predicament so acutely it surely can't be coincidence. 'Dazzle', too, is naively daring: Siouxsie's voice, framed alone against the firmament of strings. ... You can get impressed, wrapped up and lost in this'". Record Mirror also praised it in a 4 out of 5 star review, saying: the record "contains some of the most melodic utterings from the band."

In his retrospective review for AllMusic, Stephen Cook gave Hyæna a 4.5 out of 5-star rating and wrote: "The emphasis here is on layered arrangements and pop tunes disguised as art-house production numbers ("Dazzle"); tasteful horn and keyboard parts expand the group's guitar-dominated sound and provide Siouxsie with an airy and dreamlike backdrop in which to fully display her considerable vocal talents". The Rolling Stone Album Guide gave a 3 out of 5 rating saying that Smith brought a "surprisingly disciplined influence" to the band, which they recognised in the album's "best cuts: the liquid-mercury 'Dazzle', the sparse 'Swimming Horses', and a lushly appointed cover of the Beatles' 'Dear Prudence'".

When the album was reissued, The Quietus praised it saying: "[It was] their most experimental work, Smith's presence is keenly felt on the disciplined execution of the grandiose 'Dazzle' or the starkly seductive 'Swimming Horses'. But the real treasures were buried deep within the album. The lysergic Spaghetti Western twang of 'Bring Me the Head of the Preacher Man' is evocative in its execution while the densely epic 'Blow the House Down' finds Smith indelibly stamping his mark on the track courtesy of some his [sic] finest guitar work".

Hyæna was namechecked by Brett Anderson, the singer of Suede. James Dean Bradfield of Manic Street Preachers hired producer Hedges because he loved the sound on lead single "Swimming Horses". Bradfield stated: "Swimming Horses' by the Banshees – what a fucking record that is! ... I remember thinking 'You really care about that record. I'm gonna have to chase that record down." He also mentioned the importance of the drums: "I loved ... Banshees records ... where everything starts with the drums". Stuart Braithwaite of Mogwai selected "Dazzle" when curating a collection of "cinematic music" for BBC radio, saying "this record is so kind of epic and huge".

== Track listing ==
All music is composed by Siouxsie and the Banshees (Siouxsie Sioux, Steven Severin, Budgie and Robert Smith) except "Belladonna" (Siouxsie, Severin and Budgie).

All lyrics are written by Siouxsie Sioux, except where noted.

Side one
No.	Title	Lyrics	Length
1.	"Dazzle"		5:30
2.	"We Hunger"		3:31
3.	"Take Me Back"		3:03
4.	"Belladonna"	Steven Severin	4:30
5.	"Swimming Horses"		4:06

Side two
No.	Title	Lyrics	Length
6.	"Bring Me the Head of the Preacher Man"	Severin	4:37
7.	"Running Town"		4:04
8.	"Pointing Bone"	Severin	3:49
9.	"Blow the House Down"		6:59

US version
No.	Title	Lyrics	Music	Length
1.	"Dazzle"
2.	"We Hunger"
3.	"Take Me Back"
4.	"Belladonna"
5.	"Swimming Horses"
6.	"Dear Prudence"	Lennon–McCartney	Lennon–McCartney
7.	"Bring Me the Head of the Preacher Man"
8.	"Running Town"
9.	"Pointing Bone"
10.	"Blow the House Down"

2009 CD remastered issue bonus tracks
No.	Title	Lyrics	Music	Length
10.	"Dear Prudence"	Lennon–McCartney	Lennon–McCartney
11.	"Dazzle" (12" Glamour mix)
12.	"Baby Piano (Part 1)"
13.	"Baby Piano (Part 2)"

The two "Baby Piano" instrumental tracks are, respectively, a short piano demo of "Dazzle" and the string backing to the album version of the song.

== Personnel ==
Siouxsie and the Banshees

- Siouxsie Sioux – vocals
- Steven Severin – electric bass, keyboards
- Budgie – drums, percussion, marimba
- Robert Smith – guitars, keyboards

Additional personnel

- Robin Canter – woodwind
- The Chandos Players – strings
- Mike Hedges – production, engineering
- David Kemp – engineering assistance
- Frank Barretta – engineering assistance
- Siouxsie and the Banshees – production
- Maria Penn - paintings

== Charts ==
Chart performance for Hyæna
Chart (1984)	Peak position
Australian Albums (Kent Music Report)	98
European Albums (Music & Media)	64
New Zealand Albums (RMNZ)	18
Swedish Albums (Sverigetopplistan)	50
UK Albums (Official Charts)	15
US Billboard 200	157
