= U.S. Retrace =

Compilation album by The Creatures
- Released: 9 May 2000
- Genre: Alternative rock
- Length: 36:03
- Label: Sioux Records; Instinct Records

The Creatures chronology
Anima Animus (1999)	U.S. Retrace (2000)	Hái! (2003)

U.S. Retrace is a compilation album by British act the Creatures, consisting of Siouxsie Sioux and musician Budgie formerly of Siouxsie and the Banshees. It collected out-of-print material from several CD singles as well as the 1998 Eraser Cut EP. The title is an anagram of the group's name.

"All She Could Ask For" first appeared on promotional cassettes of Anima Animus as the closing track of the album, but was not included in the final track listing when the record was released. The band, however, decided to open all of their 1999 concerts by performing this atmospheric number.

U.S. Retrace was only intended as a U.S. CD release, as Instinct Records had not made any CD single available in that country. The album was also released on Spotify.

== Track listing ==
All songs written by Siouxsie Sioux and Budgie

1. "Pinned Down" (from the Eraser Cut EP)
2. "Guillotine" (from the Eraser Cut EP)
3. "Turn It On" (Bound 'N' Gagged Mix) (from the "2nd Floor" CD single)
4. "All She Could Ask For" (from the "Say" CD single)
5. "Broken" (from the "Say" CD single)
6. "Turn It On" (Emperor Sly's Elemental Mix) (from the "Prettiest Thing" CD single)
7. "Thank You" (from the Eraser Cut EP)
8. "Slipping Away" (from the Eraser Cut EP)
