= Eraser Cut =

EP by The Creatures
- Released: 3 August 1998
- Recorded: 1996
- Genre: Alternative rock
- Label: Sioux Records
- Producer: The Creatures

The Creatures chronology
A Bestiary Of (1997)	Eraser Cut (1998)	Anima Animus (1999)

Siouxsie Sioux singles chronology
"Stargazer; Siouxsie and the Banshees" (1995)	"Eraser Cut" (1998)	"2nd Floor" (1998)

Eraser Cut is an EP by the Creatures, consisting of singer Siouxsie Sioux and drummer Budgie formerly of Siouxsie and the Banshees. It contains four unreleased songs taken from the Anima Animus recording sessions which took place in 1995–1996. This EP was later included on the compilation U.S. Retrace.

After the last Banshees tour, the Creatures reconvened in autumn 1995. In April 1996, when the Banshees officially called it a day, Siouxsie and Budgie announced that the Creatures were now their full-time effort. This EP was the first release of the Creatures since 1989's Boomerang. Eraser Cut was released in August 1998 on both 10-inch vinyl and CD. Prior to that, a stand-alone single "Sad Cunt" had been issued in a limited edition a few months earlier in May and given away at two Creatures concerts in London.

== Track listing ==
All songs written and composed by Siouxsie and Budgie.

1. "Pinned Down"
2. "Guillotine"
3. "Thank You"
4. "Slipping Away"
