= Melt! (Siouxsie and the Banshees song) =

"Melt!"/"Il est né, le divin Enfant"

Single by Siouxsie and the Banshees

from the album A Kiss in the Dreamhouse
- B-side: "A Sleeping Rain"
- Released: 26 November 1982
- Recorded: 1982
- Genre: Post-punk
- Label: Polydor
- Songwriters: Susan Ballion, Peter Edward Clarke, John McGeoch and Steven Severin
- Producers: Siouxsie and the Banshees

Siouxsie and the Banshees singles chronology
| "Slowdive" (1982) | "Melt!"/"Il est né, le divin Enfant" (1982) | "Dear Prudence" (1983) |

Siouxsie Sioux singles chronology
| ""Slowdive"; Siouxsie and the Banshees" (1982) | "Melt!" (1982) | ""Miss the Girl"; The Creatures" (1983) |

"Melt!" is a song by English post-punk band Siouxsie and the Banshees. It was released in 1982 by record label Polydor as a double A-sided single with the song "Il Est Né, Le Divin Enfant" and is the second and final single from the band's fifth studio album, A Kiss in the Dreamhouse ("Il est né, le divin Enfant" does not appear on that album).

== Content ==
The sensual lyrics of "Melt!" compare an intense sexual interlude with a lover to dying. Its lyrics can also allude to a S&M encounter ("...Handcuffed in lace, blood and sperm / Swimming in poison / Gasping in the fragrance / Sweat carves a screenplay / Of discipline and devotion...").

Dave Morrison of Select observed that "The Baudelairean imagery of 'Melt' evokes claustrophobic scents of opium, sex and sickly flowers, and lapses into morbidity with lines like, 'You are the melting man and, as you melt, you are beheaded'".

"Il est né, le divin Enfant" was an adaptation of a traditional French Christmas carol. This track was exclusive to this single, and remained unreleased on LP or CD for many years until the appearance of the Siouxsie and the Banshees box set Downside Up in 2004.

== Release ==
"Melt!" was released on 26 November 1982 as a double A-sided single by record label Polydor. The single peaked at number 49 in the UK Singles Chart.

== Track listing ==
7"

Side A
| No. | Title | Length |
|---|---|---|
| 1. | "Melt!" | 3:47 |

Side B
| No. | Title | Length |
|---|---|---|
| 1. | "Il Est Né Le Divin Enfant" | 2:32 |

12"

Side A
| No. | Title | Length |
|---|---|---|
| 1. | "Melt!" | 3:47 |

Side B
| No. | Title | Length |
|---|---|---|
| 1. | "A Sleeping Rain" | 4:20 |
| 2. | "Il est né, le divin enfant" | 2:32 |
