= Dazzle (song) =

Single by Siouxsie and the Banshees

from the album Hyæna
- B-side: "I Promise"; "Throw Them to the Lions"
- Released: 25 May 1984
- Recorded: June 1983 – March 1984
- Genre: Post-punk, art rock
- Length: 5:31; 3:38 (7" / Video Version)
- Label: Polydor
- Songwriters: Susan Ballion, Peter Edward Clarke, Robert Smith and Steven Severin
- Producers: Siouxsie and the Banshees; Mike Hedges

Siouxsie and the Banshees singles chronology
"Swimming Horses" (1984)	"Dazzle" (1984)	"Overground" (1984)

Music video
- "Dazzle" on YouTube

"Dazzle" is a song by the English post-punk band Siouxsie and the Banshees. It was released on 25 May 1984 by Polydor Records as the second single from their sixth studio album, Hyæna.

== Content ==
The song begins with a gradual fade-in of an orchestral string section and progresses to a drum-driven, majestic anthem. The lyrics "swallowing diamonds/A cutting throat" were derived from the final scene of Marathon Man where Laurence Olivier puts diamonds in his mouth. Siouxsie's vocals are accentuated by expansive reverb effects.

The string section piece that opens the track was actually called "Baby Piano" (a rough piano demo and the finished string section version were both included as bonus tracks on the 2009 reissue of Hyæna). The strings arrangements were scored by Martin McCarrick who would become an official member of the Banshees in 1987. A section of the London Symphony Orchestra then recorded it.

== Release ==
"Dazzle" was released in a shorter and slightly different radio edit version on 25 May 1984 by Polydor Records as the second single from the band's sixth studio album, Hyæna. It climbed to number 33 on the UK Singles Chart and was Siouxsie and the Banshees' 11th top 40 UK hit.
