= A Kiss in the Dreamhouse =

1982 studio album by Siouxsie and the Banshees

Studio album by Siouxsie and the Banshees
- Released: 5 November 1982
- Recorded: May–August 1982
- Studios: Playground, Camden Town and Abbey Road, England
- Genres: Post-punk; neo-psychedelia
- Length: 37:45
- Labels: Polydor; Geffen (Note: US rerelease)
- Producers: Siouxsie and the Banshees

Siouxsie and the Banshees chronology
Juju (1981)	A Kiss in the Dreamhouse (1982)	Nocturne (1983)

Siouxsie Sioux chronology
Wild Things; The Creatures (1981)	A Kiss in the Dreamhouse (1982)	Feast; The Creatures (1983)

Singles from A Kiss in the Dreamhouse
- 1. "Slowdive" Released: 1 October 1982; 2. "Melt!" Released: 26 November 1982

A Kiss in the Dreamhouse is the fifth studio album by the British rock band Siouxsie and the Banshees, released on 5 November 1982 by Polydor Records. The album was produced by the band, with engineering by Mike Hedges. The record marked a change of musical direction, as the group used strings for the first time and experimented in the studio. Guitarist John McGeoch played more instruments, including recorder and piano. For Julian Marszalek of The Quietus, the release proved the Banshees to be "one of the great British psychedelic bands."

Both a critical and commercial success, A Kiss in the Dreamhouse peaked at No. 11 on the UK Albums Chart. A 180g vinyl LP reissue of the album, remastered from the original ¼" tapes and cut half-speed at Abbey Road Studios by Miles Showell, was released in September 2018.

== Background, production and music ==
The band held back from writing after the success of 1981's Juju. During the spring of 1982, they went on tour in Scandinavia with three tracks completed: "Cascade", "Painted Bird" and "Green Fingers". When they returned to the studio in July, the group embarked on a week of improvisation sparked off by a tape-looped section of the orchestral version of "Fireworks", a non-album single they had released in May. Other numbers followed easily. Siouxsie Sioux didn't want to use synthesizers for the arrangements:

"Fireworks" indicated the direction we wanted for the album. We wanted strings ... John [McGeoch] wanted a machine but Steven [Severin] and I said it had to be real strings. They give a real, earthy, rich sound. You could hear the strings spitting and breathing and wheezing. Me and Steven have always wanted our music to be performed by the Royal Philharmonic Orchestra. We've always thought our songs would suit orchestration. Real strings have a very physical sound".

A Kiss in the Dreamhouse was the first album on which the Banshees really exploited the possibilities of the studio. They allowed themselves to be inspired by sounds. Engineer Mike Hedges, who was interested in vocals, put different effects on Siouxsie's voice and multi-layered it. Hedges also encouraged them to fiddle with effects; if the band came up with something off-the-wall, he'd want to top it.

According to the band, A Kiss in the Dreamhouse was probably their most experimental work. The album contains recorders, chimes, tubular bells, loops and many vocal overdubs. Consequence of Sound described the album as the band's "own form of neo-psychedelic rock."

The personal dynamics associated with the period in which A Kiss in the Dreamhouse was recorded were often less than healthy. The band's recently fired manager and Siouxsie's former partner, Nils Stevenson, had become obsessive in response to her developing relationship with Budgie. The band spent long hours in the studio, fuelled by drink and drugs. According to Uncut writer Garry Mulholland, the "stunningly beautiful music" of Dreamhouse was "a product of addiction, stress, old, sick love and new, dangerous love, money woes and a darkness that would eventually claim three lives".

== Title and artwork ==
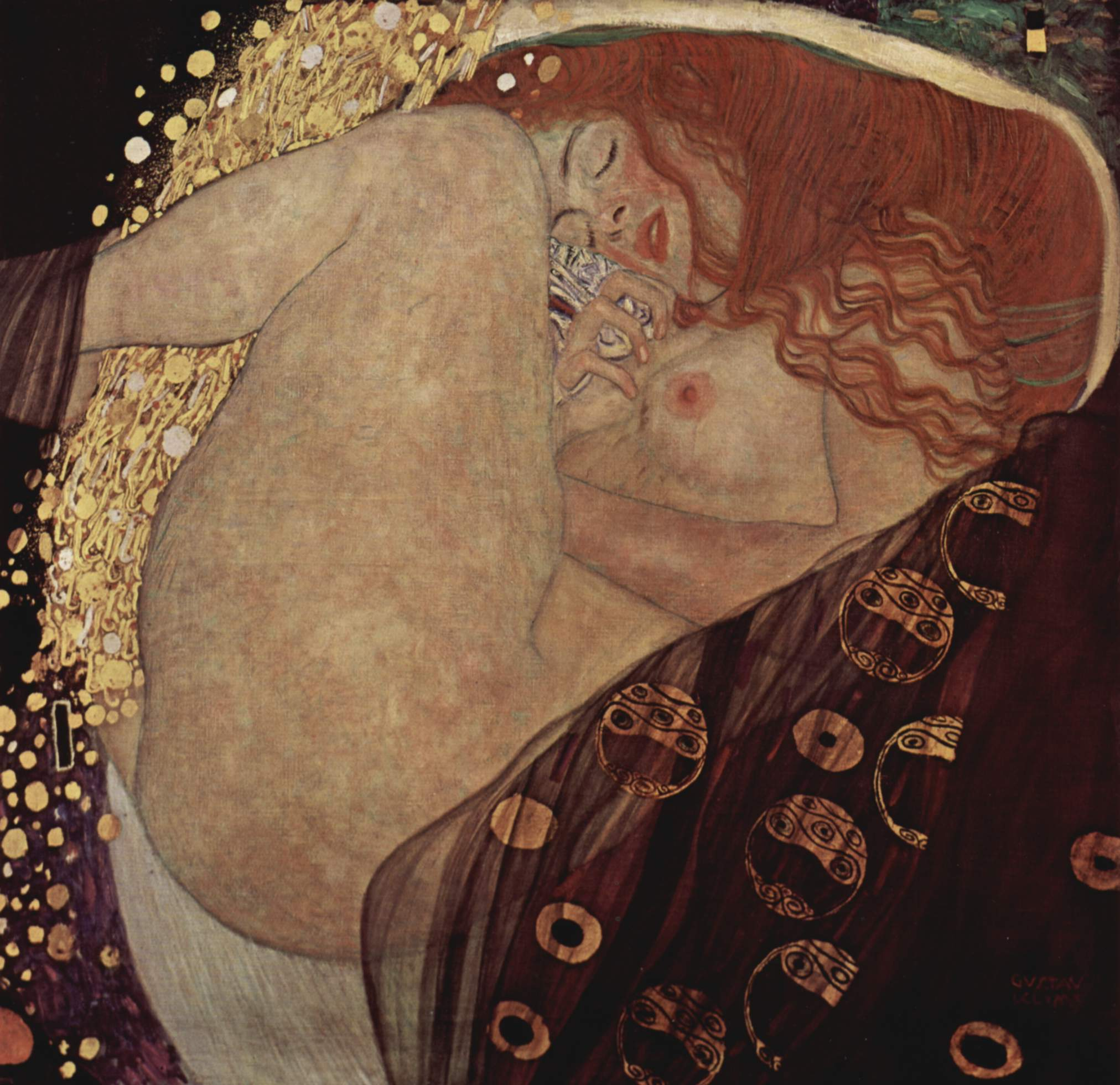
Danaë (1907) by Gustav Klimt. The artwork was based on Klimt's work.

The title of the album came to Severin after watching a programme about Hollywood prostitutes in the 1940s who had cosmetic surgery to look like stars, so they could get more clients. The "Dreamhouse" was a brothel in Los Angeles that actually existed where people could meet perfect replicas of the stars of the time, women like Mae West.

The quote in the inner sleeve, "Nellie the Elephant packed his trunk and said goodbye to the circus", referred to longtime former manager Nils Stevenson (nicknamed "Nellie"), who was fired before the recording of the album.

The album's artwork was inspired by the paintings of Gustav Klimt. As the Banshees achieved the richness they desired, they wanted "a really colourful sleeve with lots of gold and deep colours because we felt the music was very rich".

== Critical reception ==
Professional ratings
Review scores
Source	Rating
AllMusic	3/5 stars
The Rolling Stone Album Guide	3/5 stars
Uncut	5/5 stars

The UK music press was unanimous in its praise for the album on its release. NME's Richard Cook considered it innovative: "A Kiss in the Dreamhouse is a feat of imagination scarcely ever recorded. It's breathtaking. Somehow, a bold assurance of intention has met with a hunger for experimenting with sound to expand an already formidable group of songs into pure, open-minded ambiguity. The flesh of the song will balloon out or contort into unimaginable patterns; indecipherable echoes volley between the walls of the recording; glassy, splintered tones pierce the luxuriant sheen of the mix. Repeated listens trick the sense of balance; tremendous risks are taken." Cook finished his review by saying, "I promise. This music will take your breath away." Another journalist of the NME Paul Du Noyer wrote that A Kiss in the Dreamhouse was "a real departure from rock tradition" and "maybe even their best [album]".

Melody Maker's Steve Sutherland also welcomed the new musical direction: "The Banshees achieve an awesome, effective new pop without so much as a theory or qualm. Dreamhouse is an intoxicating achievement". Critic David Cleary of AllMusic would later describe the single "Slowdive" as "a violin-colored dance beat number", with "a catchy melodic hook away from being the real thing", and positively assessed the album, saying, "This fine platter is well worth purchasing". The Rolling Stone Album Guide opined that the album "hurls the Banshees back into the simmering postpsychedelic pea soup, with only marginally captivating results."

Music historian Garry Mulholland included it in his book Fear of Music: The Greatest 261 Albums Since Punk and Disco. He qualified it "a beautiful creative peak". In their 2009 review of the album reissue, The Quietus wrote: "The result was their most colourful and – ahem – kaleidoscopic collection yet". Critic Julian Marszalek commented that the album's music is "fundamentally pop, yet unafraid to revel in a quirkiness born of altered states. A deliberate shift from the overt darkness of its predecessor, Juju". Marszalek qualified the work of guitarist McGeoch as "a seamless beauty", and wrote that "Siouxsie's voice achieves a sense of strength and maturity". The journalist concluded the review by noting that "Siouxsie and the Banshees weren't afraid to stretch themselves. Here was a band that dared to challenge itself as much as their listeners".

== Legacy ==
Several bands later covered and sampled songs from this album. LCD Soundsystem released a version of "Slowdive" as the B-side to their single "Disco Infiltrator"; it was also included on their Introns compilation in 2006. The Beta Band sampled the live Nocturne version of "Painted Bird" on their track "Liquid Bird", issued on their 2003 album Heroes to Zeros.

== Track listing ==
All lyrics are written by Siouxsie Sioux, except where noted; all music is composed by Siouxsie and the Banshees (Siouxsie, Steven Severin, John McGeoch, Budgie).

Side one
No.	Title	Lyrics	Length
1.	"Cascade"	Severin	4:25
2.	"Green Fingers"		3:33
3.	"Obsession"		3:51
4.	"She's a Carnival"	Severin	3:39
5.	"Circle"		5:22

Side two
No.	Title	Lyrics	Length
6.	"Melt!"	Severin	3:47
7.	"Painted Bird"		4:15
8.	"Cocoon"		4:29
9.	"Slowdive"		4:24

2009 CD remastered reissue bonus tracks
No.	Title	Lyrics	Length
10.	"Fireworks" (12" version)	Severin	4:32
11.	"Slowdive" (12" version)		5:49
12.	"Painted Bird" (Workhouse demo)		3:49
13.	"Cascade" (Workhouse demo)	Severin	4:32

== Personnel ==
=== Siouxsie and the Banshees ===
- Siouxsie Sioux – vocals, bells on "Obsession", production
- Steven Severin – bass guitar, six-string bass guitar on "Slowdive", organ on "Painted Bird", production
- John McGeoch – guitar, keyboards on "Cocoon", "Circle" and "Cascade", recorder on "Green Fingers", production
- Budgie – drums, percussion, harmonica on "Slowdive", production

=== Additional personnel ===
- Caroline Lavelle – cello on "Obsession"
- Alison Briggs – cello on "Obsession"
- Anne Stephenson – violin on "Obsession" and "Slowdive"
- Virginia Hewes – violin on "Obsession" and "Slowdive"

=== Production and artwork ===
- Mike Hedges – engineering
- Rocking Russian – sleeve design
- Michael Kostiff – sleeve photography and set

== Charts ==
Chart performance for A Kiss in the Dreamhouse
Chart (1982–1983)	Peak position
New Zealand Albums (RMNZ)	19
Swedish Albums (Sverigetopplistan)	47
UK Albums (Official Charts)	11

== Certifications ==
Certifications for A Kiss in the Dreamhouse
Region	Certification	Certified units/sales
United Kingdom (BPI)	Silver	60,000^{^}
^{^} Shipments figures based on certification alone.
