= Dear Prudence =

1968 song by the Beatles

- Cover of the Northern Songs sheet music

Song by the Beatles

from the album The Beatles
- Released: 22 November 1968
- Recorded: 28–30 August 1968
- Studio: Trident, London
- Genre: Psychedelic rock
- Length: 3:56
- Label: Apple
- Songwriter: Lennon–McCartney
- Producer: George Martin

"Dear Prudence" is a song by the English rock band the Beatles from their 1968 double album The Beatles (also known as "the White Album"). The song was written by John Lennon and credited to the Lennon–McCartney partnership. Written in Rishikesh during the group's trip to India in early 1968, it was inspired by actress Mia Farrow's sister, Prudence Farrow, who became obsessive about meditating while practising with Maharishi Mahesh Yogi. Her designated partners on the meditation course, Lennon and George Harrison, attempted to coax Farrow out of her seclusion, which led to Lennon writing the song.

Lennon wrote "Dear Prudence" using a finger-picking guitar technique that he learned from singer-songwriter Donovan. Its lyrics are simple and innocent and celebrate the beauty of nature. The Beatles recorded the song at Trident Studios in late August 1968 as a three-piece after Ringo Starr temporarily left the group out of protest at McCartney's criticism of his drumming on "Back in the U.S.S.R." and the tensions that typified the sessions for the White Album. The final recording also features contributions from Mal Evans and Jackie Lomax. A demo for the song, recorded at George Harrison's Kinfauns home before the album's sessions, was released on the 2018 Super Deluxe edition of the White Album.

Critics have praised "Dear Prudence" for its lyrics and the band's performance. Lennon later selected it as one of his favourite songs by the Beatles. It has been covered by many artists, including Siouxsie and the Banshees (whose version was a top-five hit in the UK in 1983), the Jerry Garcia Band and Ramsey Lewis.

== Background and inspiration ==
The inspiration and ostensible subject of the song is Prudence Farrow, the sister of actress Mia Farrow, both of whom were present when the Beatles went to India to study with Maharishi Mahesh Yogi at his ashram in Rishikesh, in the foothills of the Himalayas. Farrow came to Transcendental Meditation and the Maharishi's teachings as a result of a highly disturbing experience with the hallucinogenic drug LSD. Whilst in Rishikesh in early 1968, Farrow became intensely serious about meditating, refusing to venture out of her bungalow for days on end. Of all the Beatles, Farrow felt closest to John Lennon and George Harrison, who were assigned by the Maharishi to act as her "team buddies".

Lennon and Harrison took the responsibility seriously, having similarly experimented with LSD before discovering meditation. The two musicians were asked to coax Farrow out of her seclusion to ensure she socialised with the other students on the course. As a result, Lennon wrote the song "Dear Prudence". In his lyrics, Lennon asks Farrow to "open up your eyes" and "see the sunny skies", reminding her that she is "part of everything". Singer-songwriter Donovan remembered that "we were diving deep inside ourselves, not just for 20 minutes in the morning and the evening, but we had days of it ... deep exploration of the deep psyche ... So Prudence was in deep, and this [song] was John's way of saying, ‘Are you OK in there?’"

According to author and journalist Mark Paytress, Lennon was less "charitably disposed" when commenting on the song after he had grown disaffected with the Maharishi and Transcendental Meditation. In a 1980 interview, he said of "Dear Prudence":

A song about Mia Farrow's sister, who seemed to go slightly barmy, meditating too long, and couldn't come out of the little hut that we were livin' in. They selected me and George to try and bring her out because she would trust us. If she'd been in the West, they would have put her away ... She'd been locked in for three weeks and was trying to reach God quicker than anybody else. That was the competition in Maharishi's camp: who was going to get cosmic first. What I didn't know was I was already cosmic. (Laughs.)

According to Farrow: "I would always rush straight back to my room after lectures and meals so I could meditate. John, George and Paul [McCartney] would all want to sit around jamming and having a good time and I'd be flying into my room. They were all serious about what they were doing, but they just weren't as fanatical as me." Farrow did not hear "Dear Prudence" before the Beatles recorded the track, although she has said that, before leaving Rishikesh, Harrison told her that they had written a song about her.

== Composition ==
Lennon wrote "Dear Prudence" using a guitar finger-picking technique that he learned from Donovan, who had followed the Beatles out to Rishikesh to study Transcendental Meditation. The technique, known as clawhammer picking, was later described by Donovan as "the Carter Family finger style". Donovan recalled that Lennon asked him to demonstrate the technique one morning as they sat playing guitar under a jacaranda tree; Lennon, a "fast learner", subsequently mastered it in just two days. Author Steve Turner comments that the Beatles' songwriting in Rishikesh reflected the simplicity of their environment, with the lyrics' frequent references to "birds, flowers, clouds, the sun, and the wind", while Paytress finds Lennon's songs particularly evocative of "the 'slow-motion' sensibility of life on the ashram".

"Dear Prudence" features a descending chromatic bass-line similar to that of Lennon's 1967 composition "Lucy in the Sky with Diamonds". The song is in the key of D major, with the arpeggio effect being achieved on guitar through the detuning of the sixth string down to a low D. On the Beatles' recording, the song begins quietly and builds in intensity through the subtle introduction of the rhythm section. Musicologist Walter Everett comments that, together with "Across the Universe", the song's "peaceful aura" and "ringing dronelike guitars" make it Lennon's most "Indian"-sounding composition.

The lyrics are simple and innocent and celebrate the beauty of nature, particularly in the lines: "The sun is up, the sky is blue / It's beautiful, and so are you." Author Mark Hertsgaard finds "Dear Prudence" typical of Lennon's work in that it "transcends its origins" to provide a wider message. He says that the lyrics further an idea first espoused by Lennon in "Nowhere Man" in 1965, namely: "Don't hide from life, you have reason to smile, wake up and play your part in the grand scheme of things."

According to music critic Kenneth Womack, "Prudence" serves as one of the many literary figures the Beatles created for the White Album, along with Sexy Sadie (representing the Maharishi), Bungalow Bill, Rocky Raccoon and other characters named in the titles of the songs they wrote while in Rishikesh. He likens the collection of these figures in the context of the double album to Impressionistic art, whereby the diverse elements are brought together to form a unifying song cycle. Music critic Tim Riley acknowledges the inspiration of Farrow on Lennon's lyric but says that "ultimately it's a song about sexual awakening, the heady euphoria of natural pleasures wooed by a sublime musical arc."

== Recording ==
=== Esher demo ===
"Dear Prudence" was one of the 27 songs demoed by the Beatles in late May 1968 in preparation for recording the White Album. Performed solo by Lennon on acoustic guitar, the song was taped at Harrison's house, Kinfauns, in Esher, Surrey. Lennon concluded the performance with a brief spoken commentary during which he says that the song is about "[a girl] who attended a meditation course in Rishikesh". In Hertsgaard's description of the recording, after McCartney interjects with "Cuckoo!", Lennon adds sarcastically: "Who was to know that she would go completely berserk, under the care of Maharishi Mahesh Yogi?" In his book Revolution: The Making of the Beatles' White Album, David Quantick writes that the "cynicism" in Lennon's delivery reflects his disillusion with the Maharishi in light of rumours alleging that their teacher had made sexual advances towards Mia Farrow. He adds that Lennon now reinterpreted Prudence's episode "in an anti-Maharishi light" and "Dear Prudence" was therefore "quite divorced from its original purpose". (Note: Quantick also highlights the significance of Lennon then going on to play the song's "damning flipside", "Sexy Sadie". The latter opens with Lennon, addressing the Maharishi, singing: "Sexy Sadie, what have you done? / You made a fool of everyone.")

=== Studio recording ===
The Beatles formally recorded the song at Trident Studios in London from 28 to 30 August. This period was marked by tension and hostility within the group, which had led to Ringo Starr temporarily leaving the band during the recent sessions for McCartney's song "Back in the U.S.S.R." On 28 August, the three remaining Beatles completed the basic track for "Dear Prudence", comprising various guitar parts by Lennon and Harrison, including Lennon's finger-picked electric rhythm part, and McCartney on drums in place of Starr. Using eight-track recording equipment – which gave them more options than the four-track equipment they usually worked with at EMI Studios – the band were able to perfect and re-record their parts as they developed the song. Everett writes that this freedom "allow[ed] a cleaner additive layering in the increasingly thick vocal and instrumental arrangement", and that the recording also benefited sonically from Lennon's new Fender Twin Reverb guitar amplifier.

On 29 August, McCartney overdubbed bass guitar and Lennon sang his lead vocal, doubled for effect, to which McCartney and Harrison added harmony vocals. The other contributions were handclaps and percussion, including Harrison and McCartney on tambourines, and more backing vocals. For these additions, the Beatles were joined by Mal Evans, Apple Records artist Jackie Lomax, and McCartney's cousin John McCartney. The performance originally ended with the backing singers all cheering and applauding, although this was cut from the released recording. (Note: The idea was instead used for the ending of "The Continuing Story of Bungalow Bill", a song in which Lennon conveyed his dismay at how two of the meditators in Rishikesh took a break from the course to go tiger hunting in the jungle.) The following day, McCartney added piano over the end portion of the song and, according to Beatles historian Mark Lewisohn, a brief snippet of flugelhorn. Music journalist Robert Fontenot says that although some commentators list this sound as a flugelhorn, it is in fact Harrison's lead guitar, played on his Gibson Les Paul. (Note: Author John Winn lists only guitars, bass, drums, piano and percussion as the instrumentation on the track. Referring to alternative mixes available on bootleg compilations, he and author Richie Unterberger state that flugelhorn, and a drum roll, are heard only after the applause in the discarded ending to the song.) Over the fourth verse and ending, the song's musical arrangement includes an extended drum fill by McCartney, which author Jonathan Gould describes as a "ten-bar drum solo", and an ascending countermelody played in two octaves by Harrison. In the opinion of author Ian MacDonald, the "richest ingredient" in the arrangement is Harrison's "Indian"-style guitar parts.

== Reception and legacy ==
Apple Records released The Beatles on 22 November 1968, with "Dear Prudence" sequenced as the second track on side one of the double LP. Its introduction was cross-faded with the sounds of a jet aircraft landing which conclude the previous track, "Back in the U.S.S.R." On the Beatles' 1967–1970 compilation 2023 edition, the crossfade is cut off, and the track begins abruptly after the start of the original recording, the song starts cleanly, with no jet aircraft landing effects. In a contemporary review of the album, Record Mirror's writer said: "A shock to my mind was the second track opening with the old folk clawhammer pick done on an open tuned electric guitar. John sings 'Dear Prudence' as instrumentation fades in and out from wistful quiet to booming intensity."

Writing more recently in The Beatles Diary, Peter Doggett commented that it was "strange" that the Beatles chose to begin the album with two songs recorded without Starr. He also said that, in expanding the narrative to encompass a "pantheistic vision of the world's beauty", Lennon's song served as "one of the few positive statements" he offered from his visit to Rishikesh. Tim Riley views it as a "key Beatles song about nature" and praises the band's ensemble playing. He says that, while Lennon regularly wrote about childhood and nature, "nowhere else does he sound as composed as he does here, as infatuated with the innocence he's singing about ... It counts amongst Lennon's finest songs." David Quantick writes that, given Lennon's falling out with the Maharishi in April 1968, the lyric to "Dear Prudence" instead became "an invitation to tune in or drop out". He detects an eeriness in the track that would have fitted with the implications evident in the phrase A Doll's House, which was the intended title for The Beatles.

Julian Lennon named "Dear Prudence" as one of his favourite songs written by his father. Lennon is said to have selected it as one of his favourite songs by the Beatles. In 1987, his original handwritten lyrics of the song, containing 14 lines and some "doodles" in the margin, sold at auction for US$19,500. In the Rutles' 1978 parody of the Beatles' history, All You Need Is Cash, the song was parodied as "Let's Be Natural". In 2010, Rolling Stone ranked "Dear Prudence" at number 63 on the magazine's list of "The Beatles' 100 Greatest Songs". In a similar list compiled by Mojo in 2006, the song appeared at number 44. (Note: Donovan wrote in his commentary in the magazine: "of course it has that quality of soothing but also a sense of disquiet. It was 1968 and nothing seemed straightforward any more.")

Farrow has said she was "flattered" by the Beatles' gesture in creating "Dear Prudence" for her, adding: "It was a beautiful thing to have done." In a 2013 interview, she said she had been relieved to listen to it for the first time and discover that, unlike Lennon's "negative" sentiments about his Rishikesh experience in the White Album tracks "Sexy Sadie" and "The Continuing Story of Bungalow Bill", the song was generous in spirit. Farrow titled her 2015 autobiography after the track and, as of 2013, ran the Dear Prudence Foundation, raising funds to help educate people in meditation. Asked what she thought of "Dear Prudence" in an interview with Rolling Stone in 2015, Farrow said: "It epitomized what the Sixties were about in many ways. What it's saying is very beautiful; it's very positive. I think it's an important song. I thought it was one of their least popular and more obscure songs. I feel that it does capture that essence of the course, that slightly exotic part of being in India where we went through that silence and meditation."

== Cover versions ==
=== Siouxsie and the Banshees version ===
"Dear Prudence"

Single by Siouxsie and the Banshees

from the album Hyæna
- B-side: "Tattoo"; "There's a Planet in My Kitchen" (12-inch only)
- Released: 23 September 1983
- Recorded: July 1983
- Studio: Europafilm, Stockholm; Angel, London
- Genre: Psychedelic rock
- Length: 3:48
- Label: Polydor (UK), Geffen (US)
- Songwriter: Lennon–McCartney
- Producers: Siouxsie and the Banshees, Mike Hedges

Siouxsie and the Banshees singles chronology
"Melt! / Il Est Ne Le Divin Enfant" (1982)	"Dear Prudence" (1983)	"Swimming Horses" (1984)

Music video
- "Dear Prudence" on YouTube

Siouxsie Sioux singles chronology
""Right Now"; The Creatures" (1983)	"Dear Prudence" (1983)	""Swimming Horses"; Siouxsie and the Banshees" (1984)

English post-punk band Siouxsie and the Banshees released a cover version of "Dear Prudence" as a single in 1983. It was added only to the US album version of Hyæna. The single had been recorded at a tumultuous time for the band; guitarist John McGeoch had left the band due to his purported alcoholism and had temporarily been replaced by Cure frontman Robert Smith. Siouxsie Sioux explained, "It was an insane period for us, extremely busy. We were just being totally hyperactive. I think it took its toll maybe a year or so later. John had been hospitalised for stress and overworking, so he was suffering a bit. Robert stepped in, for the second time, as he did in '79, so the show was still going on, and the touring was all pretty intense and crazy. We went on to record Hyæna together, and then he imploded as well. He just couldn't cope with it."

The band had already recorded a version of "Helter Skelter" on their 1978 album The Scream. Siouxsie came up with the idea of doing another Beatles cover while they were touring Scandinavia and listening to the Beatles' music. According to drummer Budgie, they were all big fans of the White Album except for Smith, and they settled on "Dear Prudence" because it was the one song he knew. Bassist Steven Severin recalled that the track particularly appealed to him because "John Lennon's version sounds a bit unfinished". (Note: Severin said Budgie had initially wanted to cover "Glass Onion" but "It was so obvious to me that 'Dear Prudence' was the one.") They recorded the song at a studio in Stockholm in July 1983 and completed it at Angel Recording Studios in north London, where Smith's sister Janet added a harpsichord part.

This version of the song became the band's biggest British hit, peaking at number 3 on the UK Singles Chart. The success came as a surprise to Siouxsie, who later said, "It was a surprise, but it didn't really sink in until we'd finished the touring and we were back home for the winter. Then we thought, 'Blimey! We got to number three!'" The single was kept from the top of the charts by Culture Club's "Karma Chameleon", much to the chagrin of the band. In the wake of the single's success, the band performed the track on the Christmas Top of the Pops show. Siouxsie said of this performance, "I don't remember much about doing it except for I was wearing a new leather dress that a friend had made for me, and stripy tights."

Tim Riley cites the fact that Siouxsie and the Banshees would choose to record a song by the Beatles as evidence of the latter's "pervasive influence", and he describes this version as "a surprisingly effective distortion of the Beatles' elegiac original". Further to his view on the "spookiness" evident in the Beatles' 1968 recording, Quantick says that its "ambience [was] so at odds with the floaty hippie vibe of India" that this characteristic "goes a long way toward explaining why the 1980s punk/psychedelic/Goth band Siouxsie and the Banshees were able to cover the song so successfully, bringing out its buried but implicit sun-blinded sense of menace". "Dear Prudence" was the group's first single released on Geffen Records in the United States.

=== Other versions ===
Jerry Garcia, a member of the Grateful Dead, is said to have called the song "one of his all-time personal favorites". The Jerry Garcia Band covered it in extended, improvised versions at concerts between 1979 and Garcia's death in 1995. The song was recorded for their 1991 album Jerry Garcia Band.

Among the other artists who have recorded "Dear Prudence" are Ramsey Lewis, for his 1968 album Mother Nature's Son; Doug Parkinson in Focus, who had a top-five hit in Australia with the song; Gábor Szabó; the Five Stairsteps (#66/49 in USA, #65 in Canada); Katfish, whose version peaked at number 53 on the US Billboard Hot 100; and Leslie West in 1976. In addition, Sean Lennon included the song on his 1991 Japanese CD release Happy Birthday, John, and Alanis Morissette performed it on the 2001 Lennon tribute Come Together: A Night for John Lennon's Words and Music. Brad Mehldau recorded a jazz version on his 2002 album Largo. Guitarist Tom Gamble arranged the song for solo guitar in 2021, which was featured as part of the John Lennon 80th Birthday celebrations on the official John Lennon website.

"Dear Prudence" was also performed by Joe Anderson, Evan Rachel Wood, Jim Sturgess and Dana Fuchs for the soundtrack to Julie Taymor's 2007 film Across the Universe. The song was used in commercial advertising by the US wireless phone company Cellular South in a TV commercial during 2008.

== Personnel ==
According to Walter Everett except where noted:

The Beatles

- John Lennon – double-tracked lead vocal, backing vocal, rhythm guitars
- Paul McCartney – harmony and backing vocals, flugelhorn, drums, bass guitar, piano, tambourine, handclaps
- George Harrison – harmony and backing vocals, rhythm guitar, lead guitars, tambourine, handclaps
- Ringo Starr – backing vocals, handclaps

Additional contributors

- Mal Evans, Jackie Lomax, John McCartney – backing vocals, handclaps, unspecified percussion

== Sources ==
- Babiuk, Andy (2002). Beatles Gear. San Francisco, CA: Backbeat Books. ISBN 0-87930-731-5.
- Everett, Walter (1999). The Beatles as Musicians: Revolver Through the Anthology. New York, NY: Oxford University Press. ISBN 0-19-512941-5.
- Gould, Jonathan (2007). Can't Buy Me Love: The Beatles, Britain and America. London: Piatkus. ISBN 978-0-7499-2988-6. Archived from the original on 21 January 2023.
- Hertsgaard, Mark (1996). A Day in the Life: The Music and Artistry of the Beatles. London: Pan Books. ISBN 0-330-33891-9.
- Leitch, Donovan (2005). The Autobiography of Donovan: The Hurdy Gurdy Man. New York, NY: St. Martin's Press. ISBN 978-0-312-35252-3.
- Lewisohn, Mark (2005) [1988]. The Complete Beatles Recording Sessions: The Official Story of the Abbey Road Years 1962–1970. London: Bounty Books. ISBN 978-0-7537-2545-0.
- MacDonald, Ian (2005). Revolution in the Head: The Beatles' Records and the Sixties (2nd rev. edn). Chicago, IL: Chicago Review Press. ISBN 978-1-55652-733-3.
- Miles, Barry (2001). The Beatles Diary Volume 1: The Beatles Years. London: Omnibus Press. ISBN 0-7119-8308-9.
- Paytress, Mark (2003a). "A Passage to India". Mojo Special Limited Edition: 1000 Days of Revolution (The Beatles' Final Years – Jan 1, 1968 to Sept 27, 1970). London: Emap. pp. 10–17.
- Paytress, Mark (2003b). Siouxsie & the Banshees: The Authorised Biography. London: Sanctuary. ISBN 1-86074-375-7. Archived from the original on 16 February 2024.
- Pedler, Dominic (2003). The Songwriting Secrets of the Beatles. London: Omnibus Press. ISBN 978-0-7119-8167-6.
- Quantick, David (2002). Revolution: The Making of the Beatles' White Album. Chicago, IL: A Cappella Books. ISBN 1-55652-470-6.
- Riley, Tim (2002) [1988]. Tell Me Why – The Beatles: Album by Album, Song by Song, the Sixties and After. Cambridge, MA: Da Capo Press. ISBN 978-0-306-81120-3.
- Riley, Tim (2011). Lennon: The Man, the Myth, the Music – The Definitive Life. London: Random House. ISBN 978-0-7535-4020-6.
- Sheff, David (2000) [1981]. All We Are Saying: The Last Major Interview with John Lennon and Yoko Ono. New York, NY: St. Martin's Press. ISBN 0-312-25464-4.
- Spignesi, Stephen; Lewis, Michael (2009). 100 Best Beatles Songs: A Passionate Fan's Guide. New York, NY: Black Dog & Leventhal. ISBN 978-1-57912-842-5.
- Turner, Steve (2006). The Gospel According to the Beatles. Louisville, KY: Westminster John Knox Press. ISBN 978-0-664-22983-2.
- Unterberger, Richie (2006). The Unreleased Beatles: Music & Film. San Francisco, CA: Backbeat Books. ISBN 978-0-87930-892-6.
- Winn, John C. (2009). That Magic Feeling: The Beatles' Recorded Legacy, Volume Two, 1966–1970. New York, NY: Three Rivers Press. ISBN 978-0-307-45239-9.
- Womack, Kenneth (2007). Long and Winding Roads: The Evolving Artistry of the Beatles. New York, NY: Continuum. ISBN 978-0-8264-1746-6.
- Womack, Kenneth (2014). The Beatles Encyclopedia: Everything Fab Four. Santa Barbara, CA: ABC-CLIO. ISBN 978-0-313-39171-2.
