= Miss the Girl =

Single by The Creatures

from the album Feast
- B-side: "Hot Springs in the Snow"
- Released: 15 April 1983
- Recorded: 1983
- Genre: Art pop; exotica
- Label: Polydor
- Songwriter: The Creatures
- Producers: The Creatures, Mike Hedges

The Creatures singles chronology
"Wild Things" (1981)	"Miss the Girl" (1983)	"Right Now" (1983)

Music video
- "Miss the Girl" on Dailymotion

Siouxsie singles chronology
""Melt!"; Siouxsie and the Banshees" (1982)	"Miss the Girl" (1983)	""Right Now"; The Creatures" (1983)

"Miss the Girl" is the debut single recorded by English band the Creatures (Siouxsie Sioux and drummer Budgie). It was co-produced by Mike Hedges and was released as the sole single from the critically acclaimed Feast album. It was remastered in 1997 for A Bestiary Of. The song was allegedly inspired by the 1973 novel Crash, a story about car-crash fetishists by J. G. Ballard.

The main instruments used were marimba and percussion, giving the song a distinctive and original sound. The video directed by Tim Pope on a set made of spiky metal elements, wasn't shown. The BBC banned it due to its "BDSM overtones".

The single peaked at No. 21 on the UK Singles Chart. "Miss the Girl" was the very first record released on Wonderland, a label created in 1983 by the members of Siouxsie and the Banshees.
