= Hái! =

Studio album by the Creatures
- Released: 20 October 2003
- Recorded: 2002–2003
- Studios: Gok Sound (Tokyo); Maison Néko (France)
- Genres: Experimental rock; exotica; art punk
- Length: 50:24
- Labels: Sioux Records; Instinct Records
- Producer: the Creatures

The Creatures chronology
U.S. Retrace (2000)	Hái! (2003)

Siouxsie Sioux chronology
Anima Animus; The Creatures (1999)	Hái! (2003)	Mantaray (2007)

Singles from Hai!
- 1. "Godzilla!" Released: October 13, 2003

Hái! is the fourth and final studio album by British duo the Creatures, composed of vocalist Siouxsie Sioux and percussionist Budgie. It was released on 20 October 2003.

The album was recorded in two parts: the drums were recorded by Budgie and Kodo drummer Leonard Eto in Tokyo in August 2002 and the rest of the recording was done in Europe. During their stay in Japan, the band was inspired and "touched by the delicate snowfall imagery of Akira Kurosawa's Ikiru (1952), absorbing the vibrancy of Tokyo's Roppongi district, and spiritualised by the ancient Shinto shrines and tranquil shores of Lake Ashi."

Hái! was hailed by critics for its "Anglo-Japanese beauty" upon its release in 2003.

== Background ==
In April 2002, Budgie was touring the U.S. with the Banshees, and while in Chicago, met Japanese producer Hoppy Kamiyama, known for his work with Leonard Eto, previously of the Kodo Drummers. Budgie and Siouxsie had long wanted to collaborate with Eto, but had never contacted him. After an exchange of emails with Eto, the Creatures booked a studio in Tokyo and invited him to join them for a session on 19 August 2002. They approached the session in the same way as they conceived Feast: "Turn up and see what happens!". "The Creatures are primal: it's our guts, our deepest instincts coming through" commented Budgie. During that first recording session, Siouxsie took notes and stockpiled ideas for the songs. In the days that followed the session, the duo visited Roppongi district, the Shinto shrines and Lake Ashi, and shot images with a DV camera (that footage would later appear in a documentary included as a DVD in a limited edition of Hái!).

The results of the Tokyo session with Budgie and Eto on drums and percussion became the backbone of Hái!. In France, 11 tracks were edited from the initial 90-minute tape. Siouxsie and Budgie then developed the songs over a period of several months. During this time, Budgie learned sound engineering and recorded the album. Siouxsie approached Hái! like a vinyl release, with an A-side and a B-side; noting that this method was "so we could have an extroverted side and an introverted and calmer one". In August 2003, they announced the release of Hái! for October, preceded by the single "Godzilla!".

== Release and alternative versions ==
The single "Godzilla!", released one week before Hái!, included "Attack of the Supervixens", a non-album B-side inspired by Russ Meyer's film Supervixens.

The album was released on both double-LP and CD. Initially, two extended CD versions were also issued, one including a bonus DVD containing video footage shot by Budgie and Siouxsie in Japan plus the video of "2nd Floor", and another with a CD bonus featuring the instrumental version of the album. A third edition called Hái! (Nama), containing the unedited drum sessions recorded in Tokyo for Hái!, was later issued in July 2004 via the band's website. Hái! (Náma) included 11 instrumentals, featuring musician Hoppy Kamiyama on "tape (Kaoss Pad)".

The standard CD of Hái! was also re-released in 2004 with two bonus tracks: "The Temple of Dawn" and "Attack of the Supervixens" (originally the B-sides of the "Godzilla!" CD single).

The album was also released on Spotify.

== Critical reception ==
Professional ratings
Review scores
Source	Rating
The Independent	very favourable
Mojo	4/5 stars
Time Out	very favourable

Hái! received critical acclaim. Mojo praised the album at the time of its release and rated it 4 stars: "Hái! boasts more than a few moments of jasmine-scented intimacy, where Sioux's inimitable Banshee yelp does daintily nuanced dances to Budgie's intricate marimba manipulations. A robust return". Time Out considered it as a "spine-tingling achievement". Reviewer Peter Watts described it as "mesmeric", saying: "Siouxsie's voice is the dominant instrument here, snaking and curling around the bouncing drumming backdrop, elegiac and inhuman as she chants, purrs and whispers her way around the album". Watts also hailed the song "Tourniquet" as tense, sensual and spellbinding. The Independent wrote that Hái! was "an album of dense atmospherics, frenetic rhythms and, of course, Siouxsie's visceral wailing." Fiona Sturges qualified it as "imaginative, raw and energetic". NME liked the album for its "strangely skilful stuff", and Uncut praised it for its "fearsome drumming". Simon Price wrote: "It's as dense as its predecessors, built from layer upon layer of xylophones, bells and steel pipes from Budgie and 'taiko' drummer Leonard Eto. Imagine the marching band from Fleetwood Mac's Tusk let loose on the marching powder in which the Mac themselves had been indulging, while Sioux coos like a 1940s siren over the top, and you're some way to imagining this Anglo-Japanese beauty."

== Track listing ==
All tracks are written by Siouxsie and Budgie.

No.	Title	Length
1.	"Say Yes!"	4:05
2.	"Around the World"	3:39
3.	"Seven Tears"	7:00
4.	"Godzilla!"	4:00
5.	"Imagoró"	4:04
6.	"Tourniquet"	9:19
7.	"Further Nearer"	5:55
8.	"City Island"	6:06
9.	"Tantara!"	6:14

== Personnel ==
The Creatures

- Siouxsie – words, vocal melodies, arrangements
- Budgie – drums, percussion, marimba, piano, lute (Yueh Ch'in), synthesizer

with

- Leonard Eto – Japanese taiko drums

Additional personnel

- Hoppy Kamiyama – "tape (chaos-tapes)" on "Imagoró" and "City Island"

Production

- the Creatures
- "Spontaneous drum-duet improvisations" recorded by Yoshiaki Kondoh
- Drum performances, edited, additional recordings, engineered and album mixed by Budgie

Cover image

- The Shinto Bride by Kimiko Yoshida (2002)

Sleeve design

- DED Associates

== Charts ==
Chart performance for Hái!
Chart (2003)	Peak position
UK Albums Chart	153
