= Los Angeles (Lol Tolhurst, Budgie, and Jacknife Lee album) =

2023 studio album

Studio album by Lol Tolhurst, Budgie, and Jacknife Lee
- Released: 3 November 2023
- Studios: Jacknife Lee's home studio, Topanga, California
- Genres: Art-rock, electronic
- Length: 54:42
- Label: PIAS
- Producer: Jacknife Lee

Jacknife Lee chronology
Bamanan (with Rokia Koné) (2022)	Los Angeles (2023)

Singles from Los Angeles
- 1. "Los Angeles" Released: 24 July 2023; 2. "Ghosted at Home" Released: 13 September 2023; 3. "We Got to Move" Released: 18 October 2023

Los Angeles is a collaborative studio album by Lol Tolhurst, Budgie, and Jacknife Lee. The album was released by PIAS Recordings on 3 November 2023. Tolhurst and Budgie, the drummers of the Cure and Siouxsie and the Banshees, respectively, wrote and composed the album with producer Lee in Los Angeles. Multiple guest musicians contributed, including vocalists James Murphy, Bobby Gillespie and Isaac Brock, and guitarist the Edge. The album is the solo debut of both Tolhurst and Budgie. Reviews were largely positive.

== Background and recording ==
Tolhurst and Budgie first met when their respective bands toured together in 1979. The two had previously collaborated on the post-punk-centric podcast Curious Creatures starting in 2021.

The project began life as a trio with Bauhaus drummer Kevin Haskins, with Tolhurst half-jokingly describing the project at that stage as "like the Three Tenors, but with drummers". Work on the album beginning at Mötley Crüe drummer Tommy Lee's home studio along with a singer. Thinking the project sounded too much like their typical output, and not liking the mixing work at the time, they scrapped what they had. It was at that point that Haskins left the project, having to go on tour with Bauhaus, and Tolhurst described the duo as "not desolate, but a little despairing." Tolhurst confided in his neighbor Jacknife Lee, playing the demos for him during a chance meeting at the 2019 Topanga Canyon Blues Festival, where Lee suggested they start over at his home studio in Topanga, California. The group experimented with their usual drums, guitars, and synths, as well as found sounds and an AI voice machine. U2 guitarist the Edge joined during these sessions, playing in a style akin to his work with Jah Wobble and Can's Holger Czukay.

The album was incomplete when the COVID-19 pandemic hit, leaving the band uncertain what to do with the material they had, briefly considering releasing it as an instrumental album. After LCD Soundsystem frontman James Murphy offered to sing on the album, it was decided to bring on guest vocalists for the whole record. The guest musicians on the album all wrote lyrics for their respective tracks, except for "Train with No Station" which has lyrics written by Tolhurst and his son Gray. Guests were encouraged to interpret the material given to them, unrestricted outside of the group's general idea of the record's style and themes. Out of those lyrics came the common theme of Los Angeles, from which the album name was chosen.

== Release ==
The album was announced on 24 July 2023, with a release date of 3 November set by PIAS Recordings. The announcement for the release came along with the album's lead single and title track, featuring vocals by James Murphy. The song also came with a music video, directed by John Liwag, which was shot in black-and-white and features skateboarders including Mason Silva, punk cheerleaders led by Sydney Love, and Lee lip syncing to Murphy's vocals.

The second single, "Ghosted at Home" featuring Bobby Gillespie, was released on 13 September. The third single, "We Got to Move" featuring Isaac Brock of Modest Mouse, was released on 18 October, with a music video directed by Daniel Rashid and featuring Fred Armisen. Budgie called the song one of the album's "more existential" and said it was an homage to Koyaanisqatsi.

== Themes ==
According to Tolhurst, the album centers its title subject, the city of Los Angeles. Having lived in the city for about 30 years at the time of the album's announcement, Tolhurst described finding a supportive community in the city despite its tendency to "destroy" those who move there. Tolhurst first moved to the city at a low point in his life after he had left the Cure, and Budgie after his divorce from bandmate Siouxsie Sioux. Tolhurst described being able to "put myself back together again with the help of everybody here", and Budgie called the city "a place of recovery and redemption." Negative aspects of the city are also brought up, such as Lonnie Holley's discussion of institutional racism, Arrow de Wilde's depiction of "lascivious Hollywood cynicism", and Murphy describing the city as one that "eats its children".

Tolhurst also described the album as a process of "reclaiming our art", saying that being a drummer in a band is "a bit like being a shop assistant. People don't always look at you as a person, they look at you as an adjunct to the whoever is making a sound with their mouth at the front."

== Style ==
The music has been described as art-rock, electronic, and "rhythmically intricate", also involving genres such as industrial, post-punk, and glam rock. It is noted as being significantly different from Tolhurst and Budgie's prior output.

== Live ==
In 2024, Tolhurst and Budgie announced that they would perform live in the United States in May and June, including a set on May 11 at the Cruel World Festival in Los Angeles and a tour supporting the Miki Berenyi Trio. On August 22, 2024, Tolhurst and Budgie performed a live set for the Seattle radio station KEXP, including four songs from Los Angeles and a cover of the Cure song "A Forest".

== Reception ==
Professional ratings
Aggregate scores
Source	Rating
Metacritic	76/100
Review scores
Source	Rating
Hot Press	8/10
Mojo	4/5 stars
MusicOMH	8/10
Record Collector	4/5 stars
Under the Radar	7.5/10 stars

Los Angeles received a score of 76 out of 100 on review aggregator Metacritic based on eight critics' reviews, indicating "generally favorable" reception. Mojo's Victoria Segal wrote that, "Despite its state-of-the-dystopian-nation restlessness, however, Los Angeles already feels like a destination record, Lee, Tolhurst and Budgie putting their decades of world-building expertise to excellent use." Hot Press praised the album, saying it was "an impressive indie-electro extravaganza that could almost be a companion piece to Screamadelica or Sound of Silver."

Record Collector qualified it as a "thrilling" album, noting: "Rhythm is clearly the foundation block, with each track able to go someplace interesting thanks to the dynamic chassis control", with "collaborators bringing a unique character to each song." MusicOMH praised it saying, "Los Angeles never seems to run out of steam, and there more than enough excellent moments to hope that a second volume may be in the offering." Under the Radar praised it, saying: "Los Angeles is a rollercoaster of twisting and churning tempos [...] done with a tuneful ear and is highly entertaining".

=== Year-end lists ===
Los Angeles on year-end lists
Publication	#	Ref.
Louder Than War	4	
New Noise Magazine	25	

== Track listing ==
All music is composed by Budgie, Jacknife Lee, and Lol Tolhurst.

Los Angeles track listing
No.	Title	Lyrics	Length
1.	"This Is What It Is (To Be Free)" (featuring Bobby Gillespie)	Gillespie; Jacknife Lee	4:44
2.	"Los Angeles" (featuring James Murphy)	Murphy	6:24
3.	"Uh Oh" (featuring Arrow de Wilde and Mark Bowen)	de Wilde	3:44
4.	"Ghosted at Home" (featuring Bobby Gillespie)	Gillespie	4:34
5.	"Train with No Station" (featuring the Edge)	Lol Tolhurst; Gray Tolhurst	3:32
6.	"Bodies" (featuring Lonnie Holley and Mary Lattimore)	Holley	5:23
7.	"Everything and Nothing"		3:40
8.	"Travel Channel" (featuring Pan Amsterdam)	Pan Amsterdam	3:05
9.	"Country of the Blind" (featuring Bobby Gillespie)	Gillespie	4:33
10.	"The Past (Being Eaten)"		1:28
11.	"We Got to Move" (featuring Isaac Brock)	Brock	3:42
12.	"Noche Oscura" (featuring the Edge)		4:44
13.	"Skins" (featuring James Murphy)	Murphy	5:09
Total length:			54:42

== Charts ==
Chart performance for Los Angeles
Chart (2023)	Peak position
Scottish Albums (Official Charts)	41
UK Album Downloads (Official Charts)	58
UK Independent Albums (Official Charts)	16
