= Fury Eyes =

Single by The Creatures

from the album Boomerang
- B-side: "Abstinence (Short)", "Abstinence (Long)", "Fury Eyes (20/20 Remix)"
- Released: 19 February 1990
- Recorded: May 1989
- Genre: Alternative music
- Label: Polydor, Geffen
- Songwriter: The Creatures
- Producers: The Creatures, Mike Hedges

The Creatures singles chronology
"Standing There" (1989)	"Fury Eyes" (1990)	"2nd Floor" (1998)

Music video
- "Fury Eyes" on Dailymotion

Siouxsie singles chronology
"Standing There" (1989)	"Fury Eyes" (1990)	"Kiss Them for Me" (1991)

"Fury Eyes" is a song recorded by English band the Creatures (aka singer Siouxsie Sioux and drummer Budgie). The song was co-produced by Mike Hedges. It was remixed by Pascal Gabriel for release as the second single of the critically acclaimed Boomerang album.

The song was inspired by the 1988 novel In the Eyes of Mr Fury by Philip Ridley. The single was released prior to the duo's first ever European tour. The cover and artwork were created by Anton Corbijn and Area. The photo session took place in Andalucía, Spain in May 1989.

The song was also popular on US alternative radio, reaching number 12 on the Billboard Modern Rock Tracks chart on 17 March 1990.

== Track listing ==
- US Maxi Single
1. "Fury Eyes" (7" Remix) – 3:06
2. "Fury Eyes" (20/20 Mix) – 5:32
3. "Fury Eyes" (Dub Mix) – 3:39
4. "Abstinence" – 3:47
5. "Standing There" (Andalucian Mix) – 10:09
6. "Divided" – 2:49
