= Slowdive (song) =

Single by Siouxsie and the Banshees

from the album A Kiss in the Dreamhouse
- B-side: "Cannibal Roses"; "Obsession II"
- Released: 1 October 1982
- Recorded: 1982
- Genre: Dance-rock; post-punk; psychedelic pop
- Length: 3:42
- Label: Polydor
- Songwriters: Susan Ballion, Peter Edward Clarke, John McGeoch and Steven Severin
- Producers: Siouxsie and the Banshees

Siouxsie and the Banshees singles chronology
"Fireworks" (1982)	"Slowdive" (1982)	"Melt!" (1982)

Music video
- "Slowdive" on YouTube

"Slowdive" is a song by English post-punk band Siouxsie and the Banshees. It was released in 1982 by record label Polydor as the first single from the band's fifth studio album, A Kiss in the Dreamhouse.

== Music ==
The song (and the album) was representative of Siouxsie and the Banshees' more elaborate and experimental musical direction at the time. The overtones of the song were accentuated by a string section, including violins and a cello. AllMusic later described "Slowdive" as "a violin-colored dance beat number" with "a catchy melodic hook". The Guardian's music critic Dave Simpson deemed it one of the band's very best recordings, noting that it "sounds like the lid being slowly released on a pressure cooker, as the band emerge from the black and flit from suspense to sensuality. They change course again musically, too, switching from brooding rock to psychedelic pop". Rolling Stone noted the influence of German rock in the drums beats: "Siouxsie hits the dance floor in "Slowdive", tapping into the krautrock power groove of bands like Can".

== Release ==
"Slowdive" was released on 1 October 1982 by record label Polydor. The song just missed becoming a top 40 hit, peaking at number 41 in the UK Singles Chart.

The song's release on 12" vinyl included an extended version (which would be released on the expanded, remastered edition of A Kiss in the Dreamhouse in 2009) and an instrumental version of the third track on Dreamhouse, "Obsession", titled "Obsession II".

== Legacy ==
The title of the song inspired the name of the band Slowdive, as that was later confirmed by the musicians in interviews.

"Slowdive" was covered by LCD Soundsystem in January 2005 for an XFM radio session and was also released as the B-side of their "Disco Infiltrator" single. “Slowdive” was a consistent part of LCD Soundsystem's live set in 2005, serving as the show closer.

== Track listing ==
7" single

Side A
No.	Title	Length
1.	"Slowdive"	3:42

Side B
No.	Title	Length
1.	"Cannibal Roses"	4:30

12" single

Side A
No.	Title	Length
1.	"Slowdive (Extended)"	5:45

Side B
No.	Title	Length
1.	"Obsession II"	3:53
2.	"Cannibal Roses"	4:30

== Personnel ==
Siouxsie and the Banshees

- Siouxsie Sioux – vocals
- Steven Severin – six-string bass guitar
- John McGeoch – guitar
- Budgie – drums, percussion, harmonica

Additional personnel

- Anne Stephenson – violin
- Virginia Hewes – violin
