= Standing There =

Single by the Creatures

from the album Boomerang
- B-side: "Divided"; "Solar Choir"
- Released: 2 October 1989
- Recorded: May 1989
- Genre: Alternative rock, exotica
- Label: Polydor; Geffen
- Songwriter(s): The Creatures
- Producer(s): The Creatures; Mike Hedges

The Creatures singles chronology
"Right Now" (1983)	"Standing There" (1989)	"Fury Eyes" (1989)

Music video
- "Standing There" on Dailymotion

Siouxsie singles chronology
""The Last Beat of My Heart"; Siouxsie and the Banshees" (1988)	"Standing There" (1989)	""Fury Eyes"; The Creatures" (1990)

"Standing There" is a song recorded by English band the Creatures (also known as singer Siouxsie Sioux and drummer Budgie). It was co-produced by Mike Hedges and featured Gary Barnacle on saxophone and Peter Thoms on trombone.

It was the lead single of Boomerang, the second album by the Creatures. Melody Maker wrote:

"Standing There", the stampeding first single from the "Boomerang" album, deals with this self-same battle of the sexes but deliberately brings it all back home.

— Steve Sutherland

The lyrics are about a strong issue. Budgie commented: "It's about the direct contact you get on the street, it's not just verbal abuse anymore. You see them up ahead and wonder, 'Should I cross over the road or turn around and go back?' They're making you think about regular things, you're walking round with your guard up all the time. You'll always get it if you look a bit different, they go 'Are you a boy or a girl, darling?' I used to get beaten up and pushed through shop windows in Liverpool in 1977, and nothing's changed".

The first B-side, "Divided", was not included on the album. However, additional B-side "Solar Choir" was added to the CD release.

In the US, the song was played a lot on the alternative radio stations; it peaked at number 4 on the Billboard Modern Rock Tracks chart in January 1990.
