= Godzilla! =

2003 single by The Creatures

Single by The Creatures

from the album Hái!
- B-side: "The Temple of Dawn", "Attack of the Super Vixens"
- Released: 13 October 2003
- Recorded: 2003
- Genre: Alternative
- Label: Sioux Records
- Songwriter: The Creatures
- Producer: The Creatures

The Creatures singles chronology
| "Prettiest Thing" (1999) | "Godzilla!" (2003) |

Music video
- "Godzilla!" on YouTube

Siouxsie singles chronology
| "Prettiest Thing" (1999) | "Godzilla!" (2003) | "Into a Swan" (2007) |

"Godzilla!" is a song recorded by English band the Creatures, consisting of singer Siouxsie Sioux and drummer Budgie. It was produced by the duo and was the lead single from their fourth and final album, Hái!.

The single was released on three separate CDs. CD 1 included "Godzilla! (Radio Edit)" and two B-sides, "The Temple of Dawn" and "Attack of the Super Vixens." CD 2 was a VCD and included videos for "Godzilla!" and "Godzilla! (Instrumental)". CD 3 included "Godzilla! (Budgie's Tokyo First Mix)", "Godzilla! (Instrumental)" and "Godzilla! (Tokyo Session)."

"Godzilla!" entered the UK Singles Chart in October 2003, ranking 53rd.
