= A Bestiary Of =

Compilation album by The Creatures
- Released: 27 October 1997
- Recorded: May 1981; January 1983; June 1983
- Genre: Alternative, exotica
- Label: Polydor

The Creatures chronology
Boomerang (1990)	A Bestiary Of (1997)	Anima Animus (1999)

Professional ratings
Review scores
Source	Rating
Allmusic	4.5/5 stars

A Bestiary Of is a compilation album by the Creatures (a.k.a. singer Siouxsie and musician Budgie), issued on CD in 1997. It compiled remastered recordings made by the band between 1981 and 1983, including the Wild Things EP, the Feast album, the B-side of "Miss the Girl" and the "Right Now" single (backed by "Weathercade"). The compilation album was also released on Spotify.

== Track listing ==
All tracks by Siouxsie and Budgie except "Right Now" written by Herbie Mann and Carl Sigman

No.	Title	Original Album	Length
1.	"Mad Eyed Screamer"	Wild Things EP
2.	"So Unreal"	Wild Things EP
3.	"But Not Them"	Wild Things EP
4.	"Wild Thing"	Wild Things EP
5.	"Thumb"	Wild Things EP
6.	"Morning Dawning"	Feast
7.	"Inoa'ole"	Feast
8.	"Ice House"	Feast
9.	"Dancing on Glass"	Feast
10.	"Gecko"	Feast
11.	"Sky Train"	Feast
12.	"Festival of Colours"	Feast
13.	"Miss the Girl"	Feast
14.	"A Strutting Rooster"	Feast
15.	"Flesh"	Feast
16.	"Hot Springs in the Snow"	B-side of "Miss the Girl" single
17.	"Weathercade"	B-side of "Right Now" single
18.	"Right Now"	A-side single
