= Feast (The Creatures album) =

Studio album by the Creatures
- Released: May 1983
- Recorded: January 1983
- Studio: Sea-West Studios, Oahu, Hawaii
- Genre: Post-punk, exotica, art pop
- Length: 35:46
- Label: Polydor
- Producer: The Creatures; Mike Hedges

The Creatures chronology
Wild Things (1981)	Feast (1983)	Boomerang (1989)

Siouxsie Sioux chronology
A Kiss in the Dreamhouse; Siouxsie and the Banshees (1982)	Feast (1983)	Hyæna; Siouxsie and the Banshees (1984)

Singles from Feast
- 1. "Miss the Girl" Released: 15 April 1983

Feast is the debut studio album by British duo the Creatures, composed of Siouxsie Sioux and musician Budgie, then-members of the band Siouxsie and the Banshees. It reached No. 17 in the UK Albums Chart and the single "Miss the Girl" peaked at No. 21. With their first album, the band embraced exotica, including "waves crashing on beaches", "found-sound effects from nature" and local Hawaiian chanters. Critic Ned Raggett described it as "a lush, tropical experience".

== Recording and music ==
Siouxsie and Budgie decided where to record the album by randomly placing a pin on a map of the world; the result was the U.S. state of Hawaii. Several songs are about their experiences in that region, including "Festival of Colours" and "A Strutting Rooster". The main percussion instruments are a marimba and a metallophone.

Budgie used an item called a waterphone for the recording. waterphone. He described it as "a huge metal bottle with a fat bottom and thin top. It's made out of copper and around the circumference are different lengths of copper welded onto the body. You fill it with water and play it with a violin bow."

Mark Brennan of Melody Maker said that the album's opening track "Morning Dawning" "begins with the sound of complicity: waves rushing against a beach, waves that are ... the languid laps of dawn – a soundtrack for the netherland that are souvenirs between memories of dark and anticipations of light, the state between lingering in the past and launching into the future".

The song title "Inoa ʻOle" is Hawaiian for "no name". "Ice House" was inspired by an obscure television play, while single "Miss the Girl" was inspired by the J. G. Ballard novel Crash. "Dancing on Glass" was based on an Indian musical; during the studio session, the sounds of broken glass were created by Siouxsie and Budgie dancing on broken mirrors while wearing tough shoes.

== Release ==
Feast was released by Polydor Records on 15 May 1983, two years after the Wild Things EP. Feast was also the first album released on Wonderland, a label created in 1983 by the members of Siouxsie and the Banshees. There wasn't any domestic release in North America bar copies distributed on import.

The album was entirely remastered in 1997 and reissued as part of the A Bestiary Of CD compilation, which was also released on Spotify.

== Critical reception ==
Professional ratings
Review scores
Source	Rating
AllMusic	4/5 stars
Record Mirror	4/5 stars

Feast was released to critical acclaim. Paul Prayag of Record Mirror praised the album, awarding it a score of 4 out of 5 and writing: "Siouxsie and Budgie are wandering deeper and deeper into a jungle that looks like having no easily definable boundaries". Melody Maker described Feast as "an album of filtered brilliance, fertile, sensual and erotic; an album that, in its desperate naivety, attempts to articulate that moment when the monsoon ends, when the smell and the heat conspire in a perfumed mist and life sprouts instantly, green and luxurious". Reviewer Mark Brennan said it was "breathlessly exotic and breathtakingly erotic". NME also hailed it: "The Creatures have assembled a multifarious sonic boom that is as various and kaleidoscopic as can be imagined. The humours of Sioux's frosty larynx are nakedly outlined against skins of sometimes fabulous quality. The drum sound on 'Ice House' must be one of the greatest on record".

== Track listing ==
All tracks are written by The Creatures except where noted.

No.	Title	Writer(s)	Length
1.	"Morning Dawning"		4:02
2.	"Inoa ʻOle"		3:49
3.	"Ice House"		2:46
4.	"Dancing on Glass"		2:16
5.	"Gecko"		3:50
6.	"Sky Train"		3:15
7.	"Festival of Colours"		3:33
8.	"Miss the Girl"		2:35
9.	"A Strutting Rooster"	Traditional; arranged by The Creatures	5:04
10.	"Flesh"		4:26

== Personnel ==
The Creatures

- Siouxsie Sioux – vocals
- Budgie – drums, percussion

with:

- The Lamalani Hula Academy Hawaiian Chanters – choir on "Morning Dawning", "Inoa 'Ole" and "A Strutting Rooster"

Technical

- The Creatures – recording
- Rob O'Connor, The Creatures – sleeve design
- Gil Gilbert – photography

"Sea noises courtesy of Sunset Beach. Jungle noises courtesy of Rick and Donna's back garden. Broken glass courtesy of the night before."
