= Right Now (Herbie Mann song) =

1962 song by Herbie Mann and Carl Sigman

"Right Now" is an uptempo 1962 jazz/pop song with music by Herbie Mann and lyrics by Carl Sigman. As a jazz instrumental, it was the title track of Right Now, a 1962 bossa nova-style album by Mann. Later that same year, with lyrics by Sigman, the song was popularized by jazz singer Mel Tormé on his album Comin' Home Baby!, and was the B-side of the single featuring the title track.

It was later covered in a variety of pop styles, including recordings by Siouxsie Sioux and her second band the Creatures, who scored a top 15 hit in the UK Singles Chart in 1983.

== The Creatures version ==
"Right Now"

Single by the Creatures

from the album A Bestiary Of
- B-side: "Weathercade"; "Festival of Colours"
- Released: July 8, 1983
- Recorded: 1983
- Genre: Alternative, pop
- Label: Polydor
- Composer: Herbie Mann
- Lyricist: Carl Sigman
- Producer: The Creatures

The Creatures singles chronology
"Miss the Girl" (1983)	"Right Now" (1983)	"Standing There" (1989)

Siouxsie singles chronology
"Miss the Girl" (1983)	"Right Now" (1983)	"Dear Prudence"" (1983)

Music video
- "Right Now" on YouTube

The Creatures (a.k.a. singer Siouxsie Sioux and drummer Budgie) recorded a cover version of "Right Now" in 1983. Produced by the duo, it was released as a single by Polydor Records on 8 July 1983. Their version, recorded in '60s style with a brass section (Gary Barnacle on saxophone, Peter Thoms on trombone and Luke Tunney on trumpet) and timpani, later peaked at No. 14 in the UK Singles Chart, leading to an appearance on BBC's Top of the Pops.

The Creatures' version started with a distinct introduction, with Siouxsie clicking her fingers to mark the tempo. She also added the "palala pam pam" that she sings before the arrival of the congas. These special arrangements were not present in the initial version by Mel Tormé; they were created by the Creatures.

The Creatures' single was praised by contemporary critics. It was single of the week in the Melody Maker'. Reviewer Paul Colbert wrote, "The Creatures slipped through an unlocked back window, ransacked the place and left with the best ideas in a fast car. Like all the greatest criminal minds they strike without a warning and only they know the plan. We have to piece the clues into a cover story. From the earliest seconds of 'Right Now' you know you're on shifting ground. Siouxsie baba da baping away to the noise of her own fingers clicking until Budgie barges in with congas on speed. Christ which way is this going? The one direction you don't expect is a vagrant big band coughing out drunken bursts of brass in a Starlight Room of its own making. Budgie and Siouxsie - the Fred and Ginger of the wayward world".

Number One's Paul Bursche shared the same point of view, writing, "A big blast of '60s swing laced with a deft '80s touch sung by none other than the graceful - Siouxsie? Releasing a cover version of Mel Tormé's classic is about the most alternative thing the Creatures could have done. And it works. The siren really sounds great as layer after layer of multi-tracked voice get going. And wait for the video. A gold plated hit for sure".

The video, featuring Siouxsie covered in golden powder, was directed by Tim Pope.

The Creatures' version of "Right Now" was later included on the band's 1997 compilation album A Bestiary Of. It was also featured in the film My Best Friend's Birthday (1987), which was Quentin Tarentino's first short film.
