= Boomerang (The Creatures album) =

Studio album by the Creatures
- Released: 6 November 1989
- Recorded: May 1989
- Genres: Alternative music, art pop, exotica
- Length: 56:33 (on CD)
- Labels: Polydor; Geffen (U.S.)
- Producers: the Creatures; Mike Hedges

The Creatures chronology
Feast (1983)	Boomerang (1989)	A Bestiary Of (1997)

Siouxsie Sioux chronology
Peepshow; Siouxsie and the Banshees (1988)	Boomerang (1989)	Superstition; Siouxsie and the Banshees (1991)

Singles from Boomerang
- 1. "Standing There" Released: 10 October 1989; 2. "Fury Eyes" Released: 19 February 1990

Boomerang is the second studio album by British duo the Creatures (a.k.a. singer Siouxsie Sioux and musician Budgie). It was recorded in Spain, in Jerez de la Frontera, in Andalusia, with Mike Hedges as co-producer. It features brass arrangements including trumpet, trombone and saxophone.

Boomerang received widespread critical acclaim from music critics, who praised Siouxsie's vocals and the choice of a wide range of musical styles on the album, including blues, jazz and flamenco. The album was praised by Jeff Buckley, who covered the song "Killing Time". In 2024, Uncut magazine rated Boomerang at number 184 in their list of "the 500 Greatest Albums of the 1980s".

== Background, recording and music ==
The album was recorded in a ranch in the province of Cádiz in Andalusia with producer Mike Hedges, one year after Peepshow. All the instruments and the voices were done in Spain, bar the brass arrangements that were recorded later in London with Peter Thoms on trombone, Gary Barnacle on saxophone and Enrico Tomasso on trumpet. Budgie conceived the brass arrangements with trombonist Peter Thoms and saxophonist Gary Barnacle, they had previously worked with a horns section six years earlier on the "Right Now" single. "Pluto Drive" is the only song entirely recorded at their return in England.

Critics remarked on the musical diversity on the record through fourteen songs. "Manchild" features a "flamenco rhythmic inflexion and savannah sunset trumpets", while the trumpet-tinged "Strolling Wolf" is an "Iberian-inspired piece". Blues and jazz elements are also featured on the album, such as on the bluesy "Killing Time" and "Willow". In a different style, "Pluto Drive" "marries a sassy low R&B base to futuristic ambient sound", with electronic loops. "Pity" is a lullaby, with Budgie playing Jamaican steel drums.

== Lyrics ==
Budgie explained the song "Manchild": "It's a story based in Colombia before the drugs cartel, it's about a small child caught up in a feud, this vendetta between his village and another rival village. In a minor way it is all about drug trafficking, but ends with the stronger village wiping out the whole male population of the other village until there was just one boy left called Nelsito. It was understood that he would live till he was at least 18 before he was assassinated, but he was shot on the way to school."

He also commented on "Willow": "It's kind of about how my mother died as it was a black area and I hadn't realised what had happened until I saw my brother. He told me what went on with the family and I never really knew until a year afterwards, and I wrote it down directly after that".

== Artwork and release ==
While being in Spain, photographer Anton Corbijn joined the band to shoot several pictures for the CD album booklet and the sleeves of the two singles. It was the first time Corbijn took photographs of musicians in colour, using filters: he then designed the artwork for Boomerang with Area.

Boomerang was released on CD, vinyl and cassette formats by both Polydor Records and Geffen Records. The album was later released on Spotify.

== Critical reception ==
Professional ratings
Review scores
Source	Rating
AllMusic	4.5/5 stars
NME	8/10
Record Mirror	4/5 stars

The album was released to critical acclaim. NME's Roger Morton qualified it as "a rich and unsettling landscape of exotica", praising "the pre-eminence of Budgie's Spanish-tribal-jazz drumming". In a review titled "Welcome Return", Simon Reynolds of Melody Maker stated that "Boomerang abounds with scarcely anticipated brilliance", qualifying it as "inventive and invigorated music". Boomerang was the album of the month in Best. They wrote: "With a lot of varied percussion and bursts of languorous brass, the Creatures weave a captivating album with baroque breaths. A mixture of strength and grace, moist heat interspersed with refreshing flashes, Latin-tropical emanations tamed by a rigid English phlegm." Libération praised it saying: "the use of space sometimes reaches perfection” on this record in which “we discover in Siouxsie a warmth, a feeling all in curves with a dark suavity, that we didn't suspect".

In a retrospective review, AllMusic hailed Siouxsie's performance, saying: "Sioux's singing is some of her best both in and out of the Banshees, still retaining the shadowed mystery that she makes her own while drawing on an interesting range of styles".

== Legacy ==
Jeff Buckley covered "Killing Time" several times between 1992 and 1995. He recorded a rendition for radio station WFMU, and also performed it at his first major London concert at the Astoria after the release of Grace.

== In popular culture ==
In 2008, "Standing There" was used by two dancers in the jazz category in the US television show So You Think You Can Dance. In 2012, "You!" was chosen in season 9 of the same TV show.

== Track listing ==
All songs written and composed by Siouxsie Sioux and Budgie.

1. "Standing There" – 3:06
2. "Manchild" – 3:50
3. "You!" – 4:03
4. "Pity" – 3:39
5. "Killing Time" – 3:26
6. "Willow" – 2:06
7. "Pluto Drive" – 4:40
8. "Solar Choir" * – 2:52
9. "Speeding" * – 4:12
10. "Fury Eyes" – 2:10
11. "Fruitman" – 2:46
12. "Untiedundone" – 3:41
13. "Simoom" – 3:43
14. "Strolling Wolf" – 4:27
15. "Venus Sands" – 5:03
16. "Morriña" – 2:49
- "Solar Choir" and "Speeding" were not included on the vinyl issue of the album: they were extra-tracks on the CD.
- "Speeding" was the only extra-track on cassette copies of Boomerang.

== Personnel ==
The Creatures

- Siouxsie Sioux – voice, instruments
- Budgie – drums, percussion, other instruments

with:

- Peter Thoms – trombone
- Gary Barnacle – saxophone
- Enrico Tomasso – trumpet on "Manchild"
- Martin McCarrick – accordion on "Speeding"
- Antonio Partida, Domingo Ortega, Eva Ruiz-Verdijo, Innia Ortega, Nuria Fernandez, Rafael Cancelo – flamenco performers on "Manchild"

Technical

- Mike "Spike" Drake – engineer
- Anton Corbijn – sleeve, cover photography

== Charts ==
Chart performance for Boomerang
Chart (1989)	Peak position
US Billboard 200	197
