= Say (The Creatures song) =

Single by the Creatures

from the album Anima Animus
- B-side: "Broken", "All She Could Ask For"
- Released: 15 March 1999
- Recorded: 1998
- Genre: Alternative rock, trip-hop
- Label: Sioux Records
- Songwriter: The Creatures
- Producers: The Creatures, Steve Levine

The Creatures singles chronology
"2nd Floor" (1998)	"Say" (1999)	"Prettiest Thing" (1999)

Music video
- "Say" on YouTube

"Say" is a song recorded by the English band the Creatures (aka singer Siouxsie Sioux and drummer Budgie). It was co-produced by Steve Levine. The song is about Siouxsie's friend Billy Mackenzie (of the band the Associates) who took his life in 1997. The production and the arrangements contain trip-hop elements.

It was the second single taken from their third album, Anima Animus. It was released in both vinyl and CD formats. The 7" vinyl edition featured "Say" backed by "All She Could Ask For". Of the two CD editions, CD1 included both tracks from the 7" plus "Broken", while CD2 featured "Say (Witchman's Radio Friendly Mix)", "All She Could Ask For (Justice & Endemic Void's Dope Remix)" and "Say (Witchman's Very Long Remix)".

The single entered the UK singles chart at No. 72 in March 1999.
