= Anima Animus =

Studio album by the Creatures
- Released: 15 February 1999
- Recorded: 1995–1997
- Studios: House of Créatures (France); Eel Pie Barge, Eden, House of Levine and Roundhouse (London)
- Genres: Alternative rock; electronica; trip-hop
- Length: 42:01
- Labels: Sioux Records; Instinct (US); PIAS (Benelux and France); Creative Vibes (Australia and New Zealand)
- Producers: the Creatures; Steve Lyon; Steve Levine; Warne Livesey

The Creatures chronology
Eraser Cut (1998)	Anima Animus (1999)	U.S. Retrace (2000)

Siouxsie Sioux chronology
The Rapture; Siouxsie and the Banshees (1995)	Anima Animus (1999)	Hái! (2003)

Singles from Anima Animus
- 1. "2nd Floor" Released: 5 October 1998; 2. "Say" Released: 15 March 1999; 3. "Prettiest Thing" Released: 6 September 1999

Anima Animus is the third studio album by British duo the Creatures, consisting of Siouxsie Sioux and musician Budgie, released on 15 February 1999.

Recorded in France and England, the album was a departure from previous Creatures works. While still retaining a percussive element, the music had a more urban sound; the band had moved from "drum'n'voice" to "drum'n'bass", with an arrow of other instruments around. Upon release, the record was well received by critics.

Anima Animus was later praised by peer PJ Harvey, who selected it as one of her Top 10 Albums of 1999.

== History, music and lyrics ==
The pair began developing ideas for the songs in 1995. "Exterminating Angel" was composed that autumn in France. Siouxsie and Budgie had purchased a lot of equipment and decided to work at their house near Toulouse. The original title of the album was Gifthorse, then Mount Venus, before the duo changed their minds to finally opt for Anima Animus, which was a reference to Carl Jung's concept of anima and animus ("the woman inside the man, the man inside the woman").

In 1996, no major label was interested in the demos, as they were judged as too avant-garde and not commercial enough. Siouxsie and Budgie then decided to finance the project themselves and began recording on their own. They produced the album with the assistance of Steve Lyon, Steve Levine and Warne Livesey. Four songs ("2nd Floor", "Another Planet", "Say" and "I Was Me") were recorded in England. While staying in London, they met Doug Hart, who owned an independent label, Hydrogen Records. With his help, the Creatures set up their own label called Sioux Records and became an independent act. The album was finally mixed in New York. The portraits of Siouxsie and Budgie for the sleeves were designed and conceived by French artists Pierre et Gilles in Paris in 1997.

Lucy O'Brien described "2nd Floor" as "a driving, thumping dancefloor thing that exudes a brooding glamour". Siouxsie said that the song was about the state a person was after having too many Vodka Gimlets. "It's when you still want more, when you want the party to continue and it's beyond being sensible. I remember times when I was the one person left in a place, and the euphoria that goes along with it. '2nd Floor' was my idea of what a private drinking bar would be, that was open all the time." She also stated that "There's something very religious about bars. They're like altars. The lighting. The colour of the bottles. Having a drink. It's like Santa's Grotto time." "Say" is stylistically akin to trip-hop, while the closing track, "Don't Go to Sleep Without Me" is a "ghostly lullaby". From Budgie's perspective, a couple of Banshees' B-sides (“Red Over White,” “Tattoo ”) were "built around pulsating drum-and-bass rhythms and offer a common thread sonically" to what they were doing during the Anima Animus era.

The Los Angeles Times noted that Siouxsie liked to unravel "tangled emotions and the fragile workings of the mind". She stated: “I use words as a way of internalizing--or admitting to--certain frailties . . . of being human,” “whether it’s a song about a friend’s suicide (‘Say’), one inspired by an episode of The Twilight Zone (‘I Was Me’) or about otherworldly romantic fantasies (‘Another Planet’), they’re concerned with discovering more about ourselves . . . and ultimately, facing our fears.

== Release ==
The first single, "2nd Floor", was issued in late 1998, shortly after the four-track EP Eraser Cut. The second single, "Say", featured two unreleased B-sides: the acoustic "Broken" and the atmospheric "All She Could Ask For". The latter song opened their 1999 concerts. All of this extra material was later included on the U.S. Retrace compilation.

Anima Animus was released on both CD and double 10-inch vinyl record. The album was also released on Spotify.

== Critical reception ==
Professional ratings
Review scores
Source	Rating
The Times	8/10
Uncut	4/5 stars

The album was well received by critics. The Times gave it 8 out of 10 and wrote: "Siouxsie, has rarely been in better voice. The opening track, "2nd Floor" is a fantastically knowing melodrama, riding a techno pulse, while the ominous, epic "Exterminating Angel" pursues its prey in lamplit streets. It's entrancing, hypnotic and inventive". The Sunday Times praised it in glowing terms: "Siouxsie's voice has lost none of its ability to seduce and unsettle. The sound is percussive, defined by Budgie's supple rhythm work. "Exterminating Angel" is exquisitely menacing, while the sinuous "Another Planet" grows to a shuddering climax." Uncut reviewer Chris Roberts rated the album 4 out of 5, saying: "Sioux's always been at her best as a harsh declaimer [...] but there are phases where she whispers, breathes, reaches for vulnerability", before concluding "The Creatures have jettisoned comfort and are phoning home from a new end zone. Anima Animus crackles." The Los Angeles Times praised it for its "eerie, disturbing" tunes as “Disconnected,” “2nd Floor” and “Exterminating Angel". Journalist John Roos noted: "the assortment of polyrhythms, trance-inducing synthesizer parts, edgy guitar lines and eerie vocal chants create an alluring sound that is both recognizable and forward-leaning."

== Track listing ==
All songs written and composed by Siouxsie and Budgie.

1. "2nd Floor"
2. "Disconnected"
3. "Turn It On"
4. "Take Mine"
5. "Say"
6. "I Was Me"
7. "Prettiest Thing"
8. "Exterminating Angel"
9. "Another Planet"
10. "Don't Go to Sleep Without Me"

^ The Japanese CD edition includes the two b-sides of the cd-single "Say" as bonus tracks, which are "All She Could Ask For" and "Broken".

== Personnel ==
The Creatures

- Siouxsie Sioux – vocals, drone, koto, zither and toy piano
- Budgie – drums, percussion, marimba, synthesizer, guitar and organ

Augmented with

- Knox Chandler – guitar
- Polly Chilcott – cello on "I Was Me"

Production

- the Creatures with
- Steve Lyon on tracks 2, 3, 4, 7, 8 and 10
- Warne Livesey on "2nd Floor" and "Another PLanet"
- Steve Levine on "Say" and "I Was Me"

Additional production

- Ian Caple on "Prettiest Thing"
- Juno Reactor on "Exterminating Angel"
- Warne Livesey on "Say"

Photography

- Pierre et Gilles

Design

- DED Associates

== Charts ==
Chart performance for Anima Animus
Chart (1999)	Peak position
UK Albums Chart	79
