= Wild Things (EP) =

EP by The Creatures
- Released: 25 September 1981
- Recorded: 25–27 May 1981
- Studio: London
- Genres: Post-punk, art rock
- Label: Polydor
- Producers: Siouxsie and Budgie

The Creatures chronology
Wild Things (1981)	Feast (1983)

Music video
- "Mad Eyed Screamer" on Dailymotion

Siouxsie chronology
Juju; Siouxsie and the Banshees (1981)	Wild Things (1981)	A Kiss in the Dreamhouse; Siouxsie and the Banshees (1982)

Professional ratings
Review scores
Source	Rating
AllMusic	link

Wild Things is the first release by British duo the Creatures (singer Siouxsie Sioux and drummer Budgie). It was issued on 25 September 1981 by Polydor Records as two 7" single records in a "double-album" style card cover, and is usually referred to as an EP. It peaked on the UK Singles Chart at No. 24, and the pair performed "Mad Eyed Screamer" on Top of the Pops. The EP was entirely remastered in 1997 and reissued as part of the A Bestiary Of CD compilation – which was also released on Spotify.

== History ==
The initial idea for Wild Things, and the Creatures, came about during the rehearsal sessions for the Siouxsie and the Banshees album Juju. While bassist Steven Severin and guitarist John McGeoch took a break, Siouxsie and drummer Budgie created the song "But Not Them". Deciding that it was complete as a drum-and-voice piece, they left it as it was, and later recorded it with four more tracks to accompany it. Budgie used marimba as an instrument. The session was produced by Siouxsie and Budgie and engineered by Mike Hedges. The result was the Wild Things EP (so named by Severin, who upon hearing it, said it sounded like something the creatures in the book Where the Wild Things Are would have danced to on their island). The only cover version on the EP was the Troggs' "Wild Thing"; Siouxsie added extra angry lyrics to the original; "Wild thing, I think I hate you/but I wanna know for sure/so come on, hit me hard/I hate you". "So Unreal" drew inspiration from the novel The Stepford Wives by Ira Levin, and "Mad Eyed Screamer" from local characters met in Hyde Park, London. The duo incorporated the songs "But Not Them", "So Unreal" and "Thumb" into Banshees concerts for many years afterwards.

The erotic sleeve art featuring Siouxsie and Budgie half-naked under a shower was inspired by the pictures of Man Ray; the artwork caused some controversy. Another shoot, inspired by John Everett Millais's painting Ophelia, featured the singer naked under many flowers and shallow water.

== Critical reception ==
Record Mirror called it "a surprise and a triumph... Several Siouxsie voices over Budgie's quite magnificent drums and percussion make up the entire fabric of the thing, but it never sounds sparse."

== Legacy ==
Singer Kate Jackson of the Long Blondes rated "So Unreal" as one of her favourite tracks, saying: "Siouxsie [has got] sharp lyrics and staccato vocals. Budgie is one of the most interesting drummers in the world. He uses drum sounds melodically as well as rhythmically which makes this drum/vocal duo work. You can hear their passion for each other in these recordings, they are so alive, despite being so minimal".

David Cheal of the Financial Times wrote about the Creatures' rendition of "Wild Thing": "Perhaps the most striking of those 7,500-odd licensed recordings [of 'Wild Thing'] is [the Creatures version] on which Siouxsie's chilly multitracked vocals (at one point she chants, 'Wild thing, I think I hate you') are accompanied only by Budgie's tribal-sounding drums. It's a version that taps into the earthy, elemental spirit of the song, channelling those few minutes back in 1964 when Chip Taylor lost himself in the darkness of a New York studio".

In 2021, their rendition of "Wild Thing" was included in the end credits of the episode one "I Exist", in the Netflix series Brand New Cherry Flavor.

== Track listing ==
All songs written and composed by Siouxsie and Budgie, except track 4 composed by Chip Taylor.

1. "Mad Eyed Screamer"
2. "So Unreal"
3. "But Not Them"
4. "Wild Thing"
5. "Thumb"

== Sources ==
- The Creatures Biography Thecreatures.com. Biography written by drummer Budgie, April 2000.
- Paytress, Mark. Siouxsie & the Banshees: The Authorised Biography. Sanctuary, 2003. ISBN 1-86074-375-7
