= Prettiest Thing =

Single by The Creatures

from the album Anima Animus
- B-side: "Turn It On", "Guillotine"
- Released: 30 August 1999
- Recorded: 1999
- Label: Sioux Records
- Songwriter: The Creatures
- Producers: The Creatures, Ian Caple

The Creatures singles chronology
"Say" (1999)	"Prettiest Thing" (1999)	"Godzilla!" (2003)

Music video
- "Prettiest Thing" on YouTube

"Prettiest Thing" is a song by English band the Creatures (aka singer Siouxsie Sioux and drummer Budgie). released as the third single from their album Anima Animus, and co-produced by Ian Caple.

It was released in both vinyl and CD formats. The 10" vinyl contained "Prettiest Thing (Howie B's Hormonal Mix)" on side A and "Prettiest Thing (Subsonic Legacy Remix)" on side B. Of the two CD editions, CD1 included both remixes and an edit of the album version, while CD2 featured "Prettiest Thing (Superchumbo's Waking Dream Mix)", "Turn It On (Emperor Sly's Elemental Mix)" and "Guillotine (Bitten by the Black Dog)".

Uncut's Chris Roberts described "Prettiest Thing" as "a malevolent mini-movie".
