= 2nd Floor (The Creatures song) =

1998 single by The Creatures

Single by The Creatures

from the album Anima Animus
- B-side: "Turn It On (Bound & Gagged Mix)", "2nd Floor (Girl Eats Boy Mix)"
- Released: 5 October 1998
- Recorded: 1997
- Genre: Dance rock, alternative rock
- Label: Sioux Records
- Songwriter: The Creatures
- Producers: The Creatures, Warne Livesey

The Creatures singles chronology
"Fury Eyes" (1990)	"2nd Floor" (1998)	"Say" (1999)

Music video
- "2nd Floor" on YouTube

Siouxsie singles chronology
"Stargazer; Siouxsie and the Banshees" (1995)	"2nd Floor" (1998)	"Say" (1999)

"2nd Floor" is a song recorded by English band the Creatures (a.k.a. singer Siouxsie Sioux and drummer Budgie). It was co-produced by Warne Livesey.

"2nd Floor" was released in October 1998 as the lead single of Anima Animus (1999), the third Creatures album.

== History ==
In 1997, two hundred and fifty promo copies pressed on 12-inch, distributed in a plain sleeve, with no text on the vinyl picture label, were sent to DJs in the UK: the vinyl included two versions of the song.

Prior to the official release of "2nd Floor" in October 1998, the band had already issued a stand-alone single, "Sad Cunt", in a limited edition in May 1998 and the Eraser Cut EP in August.

"2nd Floor" was released on two formats. The 7" vinyl edition included "2nd Floor" and "Turn It On (Bound 'N' Gagged Mix)". The CD single included those two tracks as well as "2nd Floor (Girl Eats Boy's Remix)". A 12" edition was issued in the U.S. in 1999.

A "Siouxsie, Budgie And Warne's Club Mix" of the song was later included as an extra-track on the CD-single edition of "Sad Cunt".
