= The Creatures =

English band

- The Creatures in 1989. Left to right: Siouxsie Sioux and Budgie

Background information
- Origin: London, England
- Genres: Post-punk; exotica; art rock; art pop; alternative rock; experimental; avant-garde
- Years active: 1981–2005
- Labels: Polydor, Geffen, Sioux Records, Instinct Records, PIAS
- Spinoff of: Siouxsie and the Banshees
- Past members: Siouxsie Sioux; Budgie
- Website: Official site

The Creatures were an English band formed in 1981 by vocalist Siouxsie Sioux and drummer Budgie, both members of the group Siouxsie and the Banshees. Their music, initially based on drums and voice, evolved over the years. The Creatures released their first EP Wild Things in 1981. On their debut album Feast (1983) including a UK top 25 single "Miss the Girl", the band embraced exotica while keeping percussion as the main instrument. On their second album Boomerang (1989) which was widely critically acclaimed, the duo married their music with blues and jazz; Uncut magazine would later rank Boomerang at number 184 in their list of "the 500 Greatest Albums of the 1980s". In the late 1990s, they developed a more urban sound on Anima Animus; The Times then described their music as "adventurous art rock built around Siouxsie's extraordinary voice and drummer Budgie's battery of percussion". For their last album Hái! (2003), they returned to their roots while turning to east, with an ode to Japanese minimalism. They disbanded in 2005.

Their music was praised by Jeff Buckley, PJ Harvey, Anohni, and name-checked by Neil Hannon of the Divine Comedy.

== History ==
=== Formation, Wild Things and Feast (1981–1983) ===
Singer Siouxsie Sioux and drummer Budgie created the Creatures in 1981 while rehearsing for Banshees' Juju album. During one session, they discovered by accident that the combination of just voice and drums suited the track "But Not Them". A studio session was organized with the aim of recording five songs. Budgie played marimba and metallophone for the first time; these percussion instruments would then become an integral part in the band's music. The project was released in the form of an EP titled Wild Things. The title track was a reworking of a hit by the Troggs; the other numbers were Creatures compositions. The EP reached No. 24 in the UK Singles Chart and the pair performed "Mad-Eyed Screamer" on Top of the Pops.

In 1983, the Creatures released their first full-length album, Feast. The band had decided where to record the album by randomly placing a pin on a map of the world. The result was Hawaii, which led to the Lamalani Hula Academy Hawaiian Chanters being featured on some tracks. Musically, the album was steeped in exotica and tropical backdrops. During the week of its release, the band were on the front cover of both Melody Maker and NME. Melody Maker described Feast as "an album of filtered brilliance, fertile, sensual and erotic", while NME said, "The humours of Sioux's frosty larynx are nakedly outlined against skins of sometimes fabulous quality". The album reached No. 17 in the UK Albums Chart. The single "Miss the Girl" which peaked at number 21 in the UK chart, took its inspiration from the book Crash by J. G. Ballard. Shortly after its exit from the charts, a follow-up, "Right Now", was recorded, a song that was initially performed by Mel Tormé. The Creatures revamped it by adding a brass section, and it became their most successful single, reaching the top 15.

=== Boomerang (1989–1990) ===
The Creatures reconvened six years later. Siouxsie and Budgie went to a stone barn in Jerez, Andalucia, Spain to record Boomerang, an album which blended their music with blues, jazz, flamenco and electronica. Brass arrangements featured on some tracks and Anton Corbijn took colour pictures for the sleeve. The record received widespread critical acclaim. NME wrote: "It's a rich and unsettling landscape of exotica". One of the bluesier songs on Boomerang, "Killing Time", was later covered live by Jeff Buckley. On 4 December 1989, the band performed live "Standing There" and "You!" with a brass section for UK TV Channel 4's "Big World Cafe". The Creatures then rehearsed with other musicians to play a rearranged version of "Pluto Drive" with Budgie exceptionally on keyboards, for UK TV Show "One Hour with Jonathan Ross".

In the US, the single "Standing There" was popular on alternative radio stations, reaching No. 4 on the Billboard Modern Rock Tracks chart, staying in the top 10 for 14 weeks. "Fury Eyes" was remixed by Pascal Gabriel for a single release: "Fury Eyes" also received a lot of radio airplay on US alternative radio and reached number 12 on the Billboard Alternative Chart. During February and March 1990, the Creatures toured for the first time in the UK, Europe and the US: they chose to appear as a duo on stage helped with technology and sequencers.

=== Collaboration with John Cale and Eraser Cut EP (1996–1998) ===
When Siouxsie and the Banshees ended in 1996, the Creatures had already begun composing new material. At the same time, the long-out-of-print Wild Things EP and Feast album were remastered and re-released through the compilation A Bestiary Of.

In February 1998, former Velvet Underground member John Cale, then organizing the "With a Little Help from My Friends" festival at the Paradiso in Amsterdam, contacted the Creatures for a collaboration. The concert, shown on Dutch national television, featured an unreleased Creatures song, "Murdering Mouth", composed for the event and sung in duet with Cale. That night, the Creatures also premiered a live orchestra version of "I Was Me" with Cale on viola. In May, Siouxsie and Budgie appeared on British Television show "Later With Jools Holland" with two bass players of Band of Susans on their side to perform live two other songs "Disconnected" and "Prettiest Thing" from the forthcoming album.

During that period, Siouxsie and Budgie created their own label, Sioux Records, and became an independent act. A stand-alone single, "Sad Cunt", was offered to attendees of two warm-up concerts in London in May prior to the North American tour. From June to August, the pair toured the United States as a double bill with John Cale, playing yet unreleased material: Siouxsie and Cale also sang several songs together each night. The LA Times reviewed the tour as an "inventive, spirited show", saying: "Cale and the Creatures’ inspired performance struck a perfect balance". An EP, Eraser Cut (an anagram of "Creatures"), then came out; Time Out described the songs as "short, sharp, percussive and infectiously atmospheric". In October, they promoted the single "2nd Floor" with a video mostly shot in black and white.

=== Anima Animus (1999–2002) ===
Early in 1999, the Creatures released Anima Animus, their first studio album in just under a decade. Its urban sound with the introduction of bass, treated guitars, and synthesizers laced with electronica, was a departure from Boomerang's organic atmosphere. The Times wrote about Anima Animus: "It's entrancing, hypnotic and inventive", and peer PJ Harvey later selected it in her 10 favourite albums released in 1999. Other singles from the album were "Say" (dedicated to Billy Mackenzie) and "Prettiest Thing". The song "Another Planet" was included on the soundtrack to the film Lost in Space in a version radically reworked by Juno Reactor. Two live albums, Zulu (recorded in London in September 1998) and Sequins in the Sun (recorded at the Glastonbury festival in June 1999), were released on limited editions via the Creatures website.

In June, the Creatures appeared on Marc Almond's Open All Night; Siouxsie duetted with Almond and Budgie added percussion on the track "Threat of Love". In late 1999, the remix album Hybrids was issued, featuring remixes by other acts including the Beloved. In 2000, a compilation of unreleased Anima Animus-era tracks was released as U.S. Retrace. It featured the B-side "All She Could Ask For", which was the opening number for all their concerts during that period. Three one-track CDs – "Murdering Mouth" (live), "Rocket Ship" and "Red Wrapping Paper" – were distributed to fan club members.

=== Hái! and break-up (2003–2004) ===
Siouxsie and Budgie returned with a full-length album, Hái!, in 2003. The drum sessions were recorded in Japan less than 24 hours after the Banshees had completed their Seven Year Itch reunion tour. Budgie first worked with the Japanese taiko drummer Leonard Eto (previously of the Kodo Drummers): their spontaneous drum duet formed the basis of the album. The rest of the sessions were done in France over a period of several months. The single "Godzilla!" was described as "spookily brilliant" by NME, and reviews were favourable for Hái!. The opening track "Say Yes" was used during the trailer for the 2004 season of The Sopranos.

In 2004, Siouxsie toured for the first time billed as a solo act, but with Budgie still as drummer and musical arranger. The setlists combined Banshees and Creatures songs. A live DVD called Dreamshow documented the second and last London concert performed with Eto and the Millennia Ensemble at the Royal Festival Hall on 16 October 2004. Released in August 2005, this DVD reached No. 1 in the UK music DVD chart.

Dreamshow was the last release by the pair, as Siouxsie announced publicly during a 2007 interview with The Sunday Times that she and Budgie had divorced.

The Creatures' discography is available on Digital on the streaming platform Spotify: this concerns A Bestiary of, Boomerang, Anima Animus, U.S Retrace and Hái!.

== Discography ==
Studio albums

- Feast (1983)
- Boomerang (1989)
- Anima Animus (1999)
- Hái! (2003)

== Sources ==
- Budgie. The Creatures Biography. The Creatures.com April 2000
- Paytress, Mark (2003). Siouxsie & the Banshees: The Authorised Biography. Sanctuary. ISBN 1-86074-375-7.
