= Budgie (musician) =

English drummer

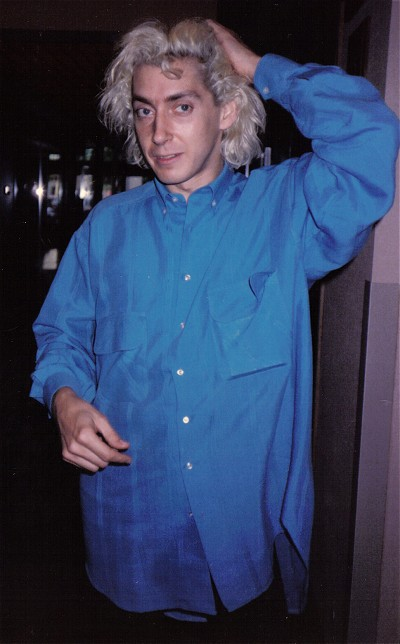
- Budgie in 1986

Background information
- Also known as: Blister, Budgie
- Born: Peter Edward Clarke; 21 August 1957 (age 69)
- Origin: St Helens, Lancashire, England
- Occupations: Musician, songwriter
- Instruments: Drums; percussion; guitar; keyboards; bass; harmonica; vocals
- Years active: 1977–present
- Labels: Polydor; Geffen; Sioux Records
- Formerly of: The Spitfire Boys; Big in Japan; Pink Military; The Slits; Siouxsie and the Banshees; The Creatures; Juno Reactor
- Spouse: Siouxsie Sioux (m. 1991; div. 2006)
- Website: Official site Curiouscreaturespodcast.com; Lol Tolhurst x Budgie x Jacknife Lee

Peter Edward Clarke (born 21 August 1957), known as Budgie, is an English drummer best known for his work in Siouxsie and the Banshees. He is also the co-founder of the Creatures.

He was the drummer of the Slits in 1979. He was then a member of Siouxsie and the Banshees from 1979 to 1996 and a member of the Creatures from 1981 to 2004. Budgie worked with other musicians including John Cale, Leonard Eto (formerly of the Kodo Drummers), John Grant and Anohni with Hercules and Love Affair. In 2023, he released the album Los Angeles, in collaboration with Lol Tolhurst and Jacknife Lee.

Spin rated him one of "the 100 Greatest Drummers of Alternative Music".

== Career ==
Budgie grew up in St Helens in the north west of England. He then lived in Liverpool in the 1970s, studying at an art school while being part of the local music scene. He rehearsed with other musicians at Eric's Club when there was no concert billed for the evening. He debuted as a drummer with the Spitfire Boys and Big in Japan before playing with the Slits on the 1979 album Cut. Years later in 2010, Slits singer Ari Up commented:

Budgie could play anything. [...] Sting loved the Slits album Cut and what he said about it was that the drumming, he was fanatic about the drums. A lot of people at the time were raving about the drums. They knew that he had a lot of technique but he had a sensitivity, you know, and a variation about him. He could go from reggae to punk to funk to jazz, you know, all over the place, but still very steady.

In September 1979, he joined Siouxsie and the Banshees on their Join Hands tour. Initially he was intended to be a temporary replacement for Kenny Morris, who had left the band two days into a tour, but Budgie remained with the group. He first performed with guitarist John McGeoch on the album Kaleidoscope: Budgie became a permanent member of the band until they split up in 1996. He released nine studio albums with the Banshees. In 1981, he formed a second group with Siouxsie Sioux, named the Creatures. Their music was based more on drums and percussion, with marimba and metallophone. The 1981 Wild Things EP and 1983 full-length Feast were their first releases.

On subsequent Creatures albums, Budgie also played keyboards, guitars and harmonica. He conceived brass arrangements with Peter Thoms on 1983 single "Right Now" and 1989's Boomerang album. Within the Banshees, he wrote the lyrics of several songs, including "She's Cuckoo", "Silver Waterfalls", "Staring Back", "Sick Child", "Hang Me High" and "Return" (the latter was co-written with Siouxsie). He also read the text on the 1992 b-side "Hothead". For the Creatures, he wrote the lyrics for several Boomerang-era songs, including "Willow", "Morriña" and "Pluto Drive" (the latter was co-written with Siouxsie).

In August 2002, Budgie first collaborated with Japanese taiko player Leonard Eto (formerly of the Kodo Drummers), recording spontaneous drum-duet improvisations in Tokyo for the fourth Creatures album, Hái!. The drum performances were then edited, and the rest of the sessions took place in France. Budgie was the sound engineer of the album, and he mixed it near Toulouse before its release in 2003. After recording four studio albums as the Creatures, Budgie's final performance with Siouxsie (featuring Eto and the Millennia Ensemble) was filmed in 2004 at the Royal Festival Hall in London for the DVD Dreamshow. This was Budgie's last concert and collaboration with Siouxsie.

=== Other projects including Los Angeles ===
Outside the Banshees and Creatures, Budgie played drums and harmonica for a Annie Hogan song called "Vixo", featuring Nick Cave on lead vocals which was recorded in October 1983: the track was released in 1985 on the 12" inch vinyl "Annie Hogan – Plays Kickabye". Budgie also worked with the Indigo Girls in 1992 on Rites of Passage, and briefly toured with them. That year, he was also a guest on Thomas Dolby's album Astronauts & Heretics playing drums on a few tracks. In 1994, Budgie recorded percussion on Hector Zazou's Chansons des mers froides, including a song for Jane Siberry. He later played drums for former Velvet Underground member John Cale on a US 1998 tour with The Creatures. Budgie played two sets each night, one with Cale and one with The Creatures. In 2009, he toured Europe with Juno Reactor and moved to Berlin. Later that year, he also recorded drums for Jessie Evans' Is It Fire? album.

In 2010, he teamed up with two other drummers, Eto and Mabi, plus multi-instrumentalist Knox Chandler and guitarist Sugizo, for a programme called "The Butterfly Effect: East-West Percussive Parade." It was described as a "drumming extravaganza, featuring Western kit, Japanese taiko and African drums, that will launch the musicians into a new sonic galaxy!". The programme's world première took place in Hong Kong in November 2010 as part of the New Vision Arts Festival. "The Butterfly Effect" featured improvised solos and ensemble works as well as new pieces and arrangements specially created for the festival, inspired by the pace, rhythm and character of Hong Kong.

He served as the drummer for Efterklang on their worldwide tour in 2012. They were accompanied by an orchestra. The premiere at the Opera House in Sydney was praised by Time Out. His last concert with Efterklang took place in Brussels in November. The Piramidia Concert, a live album recorded in Copenhagen, was issued in 2013.

Budgie and Eto performed live material from Hái! in Tokyo, 11 years after conceiving the drum parts in that city. The concert took place at the Studio Coast as part of Juno Reactor's set. He also played drums for CocoRosie at several shows.

He played drums on John Grant's third solo album, 2015's Grey Tickles, Black Pressure, playing in November with Grant on the accompanying tour. He performed again with Grant in the UK in 2015 at the latter's March concerts. That year, he also played with tabla player Talvin Singh for the first time since their collaboration on the Siouxsie and the Banshees' 1991-92 Superstition tour: Singh and Budgie gave a one-off performance at the "100 Years of Beat" festival in Berlin.

He recorded percussion for Peaches for her cover version of Marc Bolan's "Solid Gold Easy Action" in 2020.

In October 2021, Budgie and Lol Tolhurst launched the Curious Creatures podcast, in which they talk about "post punk’s enduring legacy and contemporary relevance". The second season of the Curious Creatures podcast started in March 2022, with a new episode uploaded every week.

On a suggestion of Anohni who admired the percussion work on the Creatures' records, Budgie contributed to Hercules and Love Affair's album In Amber: they contacted him "to derail some of the arrangements for more impact". In Amber was released in June 2022 on vinyl. The lead single "Poisonous Storytelling" featured a collaboration with Anohni on lead vocal.

He featured on Thomas Truax's album Dream Catching Songs: the track "A Wonderful Kind Of Strange" was out in 2022.

Budgie teamed up with Tolhurst and Jacknife Lee in the early 2020s and they released the album Los Angeles in 2023. They recorded it with guest musicians and singers including LCD Soundsystem frontman James Murphy, U2 guitarist the Edge, Primal Scream vocalist Bobby Gillespie, and Modest Mouse singer Isaac Brock. Mojo praised it as "thrilling", saying that "Los Angeles lands with a visceral impact, rich texturing and smart distortions adding a destabilising wobble". The album was issued on vinyl, CD and digital. Budgie and Tolhurst toured in the US in spring 2024.

== Legacy ==
NME readers voted Budgie the best drummer of 1983. Spin rated him at No. 28 in their list of "The 100 Greatest Drummers of Alternative Music", writing: "Post-punk introduced a lot of amazing drummers, but none more influential than Budgie. With the Banshees, Budgie didn't just play rhythms—he played hooks and leads, brilliant parts that set the songs on fire. His tom-tom-intensive approach, [was] enlightened by his awareness of world music". Spin considered his "most booming moment" to be "Into the Light", from 1981's Juju, saying: "Budgie drums up a marvel of kinetic syncopation and invention".

Stewart Copeland of the Police included the Banshees' 1981 singles collection on a list of albums with "fun drumming". He described Budgie's playing as "very economical and offbeat", adding, "Budgie didn’t play your standard hi-hat–kick–snare; there were a lot of tom-toms and a big throb." Ari Up of the Slits felt that he was "a very sensitive drummer", saying, "He could go from reggae to punk to funk to jazz [...] but still very steady." Music journalist David Cavanagh commented that "Terry Chambers was, along with Budgie of Siouxsie and the Banshees, the outstanding English drummer of the post-punk era". Ian McCulloch said drummer Pete de Freitas of Echo and the Bunnymen "loved [Budgie's] drumming". Taylor Hawkins of the Foo Fighters said: "I discovered Juju in my early 20s:... The way Budgie played drums was so influential – the tribal thing he was doing was so innovative." Jamie Miller of Bad Religion cited Budgie as his favourite drummer for having "a signature feel" and the Banshees as his favourite band.

== Personal life ==
Budgie married Siouxsie in May 1991. In 2007, the pair publicly announced their divorce. Budgie has since remarried and he is the father of two children: a daughter born in 2012 and a son born in 2014.

== Discography ==
With Lol Tolhurst and Jacknife Lee

- Los Angeles (2023)

== Bibliography ==
- Budgie, The Absence: Memoirs of a Banshee Drummer. White Rabbit. 2025.
