= Dave Gahan discography =

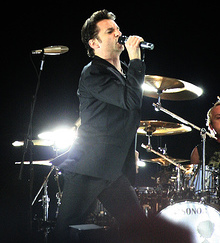
- Gahan performing with Depeche Mode at the O_{2} Wireless Festival in June 2006
- Studio albums: 5
- Extended plays: 1
- Live albums: 2
- Compilation albums: 1
- Singles: 13
- Video albums: 1
- Music videos: 7

The discography of English singer Dave Gahan consists of three studio albums, one live album, one compilation album, one extended play, 13 singles (including five as a featured artist), one video album and seven music videos. Gahan debuted in 1980 as lead singer of the electronic music band Depeche Mode. The group achieved worldwide success, producing 14 top-10 singles in the United Kingdom and selling over 100 million records worldwide.

Gahan released his solo debut album Paper Monsters in June 2003. The album, which was composed with Gahan's close friend Knox Chandler, peaked at number 36 on the UK Albums Chart, as well as number five in Germany and Sweden. The album spawned three singles, all of which reached the top 40 of the UK Singles Chart. Live Monsters, a live video album, and its companion album Soundtrack to Live Monsters were released the following year. His second studio album, Hourglass, was released in October 2007, reaching number 50 in the United Kingdom and number two in Germany. The album's lead single, "Kingdom", reached number one on the Billboard Hot Dance Club Play chart in the United States.

== Albums ==
=== Studio albums ===
List of studio albums, with selected chart positions
Title	Details	Peak chart positions									
Title	Details	UK	AUT	DEN	FRA	GER	ITA	SPA	SWE	SWI	US
Paper Monsters	Released: 2 June 2003; Label: Mute; Formats: CD, CD+DVD, LP, cassette, digital download	36	43	11	21	5	10	61	5	10	127
Hourglass	Released: 22 October 2007; Label: Mute; Formats: CD, CD+DVD, LP, digital download	50	15	16	18	2	8	18	24	5	120
The Light the Dead See (with Soulsavers)	Released: 21 May 2012; Label: V2; Formats: CD, LP, digital download	69	49	—	120	12	—	—	—	30	—
Angels & Ghosts (with Soulsavers)	Released: 23 October 2015; Label: Columbia; Formats: CD, LP, digital download	27	18	—	33	5	7	46	54	5	—
Imposter (with Soulsavers)	Released: 12 November 2021; Label: Columbia; Formats: CD, LP, digital download	65	11	—	151	12	27	—	—	9	—
"—" denotes a recording that did not chart or was not released in that territory.

=== Live albums ===
Title	Detais
Soundtrack to Live Monsters (Note: Soundtrack to Live Monsters and Live from SoHo were released exclusively through iTunes.)	Released: 1 March 2004; Label: Mute; Format: Digital download

=== Compilation albums ===
Title	Detais
Hourglass: Remixes	Released: 11 March 2008; Label: Mute; Formats: LP+CD, digital download

== Extended plays ==
=== As lead artist ===
Title	Detais
Live from SoHo	Released: 17 December 2007; Label: Mute; Format: Digital download

=== As featured artist ===
Title	Detais
Manuscript	Released: 16 December 2022; Main artist: Kurt Uenala; Label: HFN Music; Format: Digital download

== Singles ==
=== As lead artist ===
List of singles as lead artist, with selected chart positions, showing year released and album name
Title	Year	Peak chart positions										Album
Title	Year	UK	AUT	DEN	FRA	GER	IRE	ITA	SPA	SWE	SWI	Album
"Dirty Sticky Floors"	2003	18	—	5	57	6	40	7	—	18	81	Paper Monsters
"I Need You"	2003	27	—	15	—	23	—	35	55	11	—	Paper Monsters
"Bottle Living" / "Hold On"	2003	36	—	—	—	19	—	—	—	—	—	Paper Monsters
"A Little Piece" (live) (Note: "A Little Piece" (live) was released as a digital download through Gahan's official website.)	2004	—	—	—	—	—	—	—	—	—	—	Soundtrack to Live Monsters
"Kingdom" (Note: "Kingdom" also appears on Lost Boys: The Tribe (Music from and Inspired by the Motion Picture) (2008).)	2007	44	41	3	—	10	—	4	1	37	—	Hourglass
"Saw Something" / "Deeper and Deeper"	2008	—	—	—	—	23	—	—	2	—	—	Hourglass
"All of This and Nothing" (with Soulsavers)	2015	—	—	—	166	—	—	—	—	—	—	Angels & Ghosts
"Shine" (with Soulsavers)	2015	—	—	—	—	—	—	—	—	—	—	Angels & Ghosts
"Metal Heart" (with Soulsavers)	2021	—	—	—	—	—	—	—	—	—	—	Imposter
"—" denotes a recording that did not chart or was not released in that territory.

=== As featured artist ===
Title	Year	Album
"Low Guns" (SixToes featuring Dave Gahan)	2013	The Morning After
"Cat People (Putting Out Fire)" (Martyn LeNoble and Christian Eigner featuring Mark Lanegan and Dave Gahan)	2016	Non-album single
"Where I Wait" (Null + Void featuring Dave Gahan)	2017	Cryosleep
"Ocean" (Goldfrapp featuring Dave Gahan)	2018	Silver Eye
"Shock Collar" (Humanist featuring Dave Gahan)	2020	Humanist
"Stop Speaking" (Jennylee featuring Dave Gahan)	2022	Heart Tax
"Does That Hurt?" (OLI featuring Dave Gahan)	2022	Non-album single
"Brother" (Humanist featuring Dave Gahan)	2024	On The Edge Of A Lost And Lonely World

== Guest appearances ==
List of non-single guest appearances, with other performing artists, showing year released and album name
Title	Year	Other artist(s)	Album
"A Song for Europe"	1997	various	Dream Home Heartaches: Remaking/Remodeling Roxy Music
"Reload"	2003	Junkie XL	Radio JXL: A Broadcast from the Computer Hell Cabin
"Nostalgia"	2008	Mirror	Mirror
"Visitors"	2009	FrYars	Dark Young Hearts
All tracks, except "La Ribera" and "Point Sur Pt. 1".	2012	Soulsavers	The Light the Dead See
"Nothing Else Matters"	2021	various	The Metallica Blacklist
"Chains" (with Kurt Uenala)	2023	various	The Raveonettes Presents: Rip It Off
"Mother Of Earth"	2023	various	The Jeffrey Lee Pierce Sessions Project
"Dolphins" (with Chrissie Hynde)	2025	Chrissie Hynde & Pals	Duets Special

== Videography ==
=== Video albums ===
Title	Detais
Live Monsters	Released: 1 March 2004; Label: Mute; Format: DVD

=== Music videos ===
List of music videos, showing year released and directors
Title	Year	Director(s)
"Dirty Sticky Floors"	2003	Arni and Kinski
"Dirty Sticky Floors" (BRAT's web version)	2003	Arni, Kinski and Daniel Barassi
"I Need You"	2003	Arni and Kinski
"I Need You" (BRAT's web version)	2003	Arni, Kinski and Daniel Barassi
"Bottle Living"	2003	Uwe Flade
"Kingdom"	2007	Jaron Albertin
"Saw Something"	2007	Barney Clay

== See also ==
- Depeche Mode discography
