= City School (Vancouver) =

Canadian public alternative school

Coordinates: 49.289913°N 123.136074°W

Information
- School type: Alternative school
- Established: 7 September 1971
- Closed: 2024

City School was Vancouver's longest-running public alternative school at the time of its cancellation in 2024. It was created as "a non-graded, continuous progress school in which students take responsibility for their own learning and which tries to use the city as its classroom."

== Founding philosophy ==
In 1970, the Director of Instruction for secondary schools in Vancouver was Alfred Clinton. He wrote "A Proposal for an Ungraded Continuous Progress School (City School)" and in it referenced the Metropolitan Learning Center in Portland, Oregon as well as the now extinct Parkway Program in Philadelphia as "similar projects."

Other philosophical influences were A. S. Neill's Summerhill School in Suffolk, England, and the S.E.E.D. (Shared Experience Exploration and Discovery) School founded in Toronto, Ontario in 1968.

Clinton's vision closely paralleled the project-based learning methods now being adopted by innovative educators in many schools. "This approach will be radically different from that practised in conventional classrooms... For example, rather than engaging in systematic study of the various disciplines, the student will focus on the solution of problems more relevant to his needs.". Rules and regulations would be few: "Students will be asked to work together congenially, to follow agreed procedures of daily accountability in developing and working out their individual programs, to record and evaluate their learning experience and to attend on a regular basis."

As per Clinton's proposal, City School opened its first set of doors at 550 West 10th Avenue on September 7, 1971. Some ninety students were enrolled in Grades 4 to 10 in the initial year, with a faculty of four teachers and a staff assistant.

Marilyn J. Reid studied the progress of this education experiment in its first year and reported to the Vancouver Board of School Trustees, "At the core of City School is the involvement on an equal (in most instances) basis of everyone, students and teachers alike. Students have votes of equal status in matters of policy, organization, discipline and rules. This 'democracy' extends to the choice of subjects offered. If a student wants to pursue a particular interest with other students and staff, he is expected to initiate the activity himself."

She wrote: "The objectives of City School are:

1. To provide the basic subject skills based on individual aims.
2. To encourage involvement by parents and community.
3. To provide for the exploration of areas of interest not normally available in schools.
4. To develop individuality in goal setting and in self-concept.
5. To provide each individual with success.
6. To develop social concepts in a variety of situations.
7. To explore the community and become practically involved.
8. To develop the ability to think."

Reid surveyed students and parents on a School Sentiment Index and in her summary, noted, "Many students and parents felt that one of the school's greatest handicaps was the inadequacy of its buildings and equipment. The facilities were designed for children at the primary level and are, not surprisingly, unsuitable in some ways for older children."

== First move ==
After three years the school outgrew these facilities and moved to Vancouver's downtown core. The Sir William Dawson elementary school was designed by Edward Evans Blackmore and built in 1913 at 935 Helmcken Street. It closed in 1972. Its address in the 1970s was 901 Helmcken Street. City School occupied the main floor and shared the building with Ideal School and a class for new Canadians.

By the 1974-75 school year, nearly 200 students were registered in Grades 4 to 12, with one part-time and six full-time teachers.

== Using the city as a classroom ==
With more appropriate facilities - classrooms, seminar rooms, kitchen, art room, darkroom - and proximity to much that was going on downtown and beyond, the school hit its stride and began to pique media interest. Kay Alsop wrote a feature article for The Province newspaper in 1976.

"It was something new in the way of an alternative school; geared, not to academic dropouts, but to students who found regimentation irksome and stifling. And it's become so flexible in structure that timetables, as such, would be incongruous." Students were pictured studying rock formations with a UBC professor, looking at chicken foetuses in a genetics class, and loading the school van for a camping trip. Alsop listed many of the field trips the school had taken in British Columbia's Lower Mainland and beyond: geology road trips to Prince George and Banff, an exchange to Quebec. Early excursions are remembered in a film made on the occasion of a City School reunion in 1996.

These extended science trips and exchanges began a tradition that carried on. In ensuing decades, City School groups took multiple road trips with a geology focus, to B.C.'s Interior and to Dinosaur Park and Drumheller in Alberta. Exchanges, with the support of Open House Canada (later Exchanges Canada) took students to Prince Edward Island, Quebec, Saskatchewan and the Northwest Territories. Biology field studies at the Marine Sciences Centre at Bamfield, B.C. were regular events as were camping trips to various provincial parks (Alice Lake, Porpoise Bay, Golden Ears, Montague Harbour, Newcastle Island).

Closer to home, students took advantage of libraries, art galleries, museums, public lectures, law courts, university classes, film festivals, and myriad other resources to learn outside the walls of the school building. This custom continued.

== Move to Strathcona ==
In 1976 the school board decided to decommission the former Dawson School and move its tenant programs out. The entire block, which had also contained the original King George Secondary School, was later redeveloped as the Wall Centre.

Just as Ideal School fought its relocation to classrooms in Lord Byng Secondary, City School parents, students and staff strongly protested their move to a 1940 parish school building in Vancouver's historic Strathcona neighbourhood some three kilometres east of the downtown core. During the Christmas holiday closure in December 1976, the school's belongings were transferred.

In January 1977, the students and staff, wearing black armbands, walked from their boarded-up building to their "new" leased premises in the former Sacred Heart School at 884 East Pender Street. Minor modifications had been made to create a darkroom and kitchen, but the floor plan was essentially a corridor running the length of the building, with classrooms off both sides.

The forced move and the struggle that preceded it led to many students and all the teachers leaving City School at the end of that school year. The remaining students and their families were committed to maintaining the school's philosophy and traditions through further staff changes and the prospect of another move.

== Return to the downtown core ==
Declining enrolment in Vancouver's only downtown high school, coupled with a disinclination on the part of the school board to pay rent, led to City School's relocation from Strathcona to the West End. In September 1980 it opened its fourth set of doors, in what had been the cafeteria on the ground floor of King George Secondary, at 1755 Barclay Street.

Though smaller than the Sacred Heart building, the physical space had a better layout, and the downtown location was much more popular with students and families. The elementary grades were abandoned at this point, and a long period of stability ensued, with little staff change for a decade.

Constraints on the "student-centred education" model of the early 1970s came, over time, in the form of provincially mandated final exams, and demands for accountability and conformity from district administrators. Schedules and classes became more structured, but opportunities for enrichment always trumped the formal timetable.

== An incubator for the arts ==
City School's high school program attracted a wide variety of young people seeking an alternative to the mainstream school culture. Their reasons for attending were as diverse as their perceptions of what City School was about; some didn't find what they needed there but many more did.

From the mid-1970s to the present, City School has nurtured more than its fair share of musicians, writers and visual artists. Alumni were or are to be found performing with bands (Econoline Crush, Uzume Taiko, Slow, ©/Copyright, Brilliant Orange, Flash Bastard, Power Ballad, The Winks, Nü Sensae, Petroleum By-Product, Thee Ahs, Mary Sweeney, The Bank Dogs, Blue Reef, Rossi Gang) and as independent artists. Embryo writers, poets, journalists, composers, film makers, photographers, painters and glass artists explored and developed their talents there.

== Another move ==
Another funding and space crunch mandated a downsizing of City School once again, and it moved to a smaller area within the King George building in 1996. Now almost a "one-room schoolhouse," it continued to offer a uniquely personalized school experience to students in their last three years of high school for the next eighteen years.

A 40th year reunion was held in May, 2011, and alumni attended from every year of City School's sometimes tenuous existence.

== Community fights back against budget cut ==
Funding for Vancouver public schools has been inadequate for years; City School took its share of cuts and fought successfully against others. Staffing was cut in 2002, and threatened again in 2010. In 2014, strong protest from former students, parents and staff, as well as those about to be most affected by the threatened cut, made no difference to the school board's decision decrease the number of City School's teachers.

== Coming full circle ==
It was clear that the current model would not be sustainable with the new student-teacher ratio. The school community's response was a return to the personalized, inquiry-based education of its founding philosophy: self-designed learning programs, projects, expert mentors, individual in-depth studies, group undertakings using the resources of the greater community of the Lower Mainland, and classes only if necessary.

== Another change ==
As of September, 2020, City School was reinvented as a Senior District Alternative Program, offering its unique approach to a maximum of 22 students in Grade 11 and 12.

== The end ==
Vancouver School District funding for the school was withdrawn, resulting in City School's closure after 53 years.

A celebration of life took place in June 2024, attended by students and staff from the first day of school - in 1971 - to the last.

== Notable alumni ==
- Thomas Anselmi, musician, music promoter
- Fiona Forbes, television producer and host
- Taras Grescoe, author
- Ill-esha, electronic music artist and producer, DJ
- Genevieve Vincent, composer; winner of BMI Award for her score of The Broken Hearts Gallery
