= Mirror (multimedia project) =

- Origin: Vancouver, British Columbia, Canada
- Genres: Punk; alternative rock; ambient
- Years active: 2003–present
- Website: www.mirror.fm

Mirror is a multimedia project created by Canadian singer-songwriter Thomas Anselmi, former singer for Copyright and Slow. Formed in 2003, the project is based in Los Angeles, California, and Vancouver, British Columbia, Canada.

== Album ==
The Mirror album was released in 2009. It differs from Anselmi's prior punk and alt rock styles, containing semi-orchestral and cinematic elements. Anselmi says he was influenced by the soundtracks of David Lynch films and by the aesthetics of pop music and television variety shows, particularly German Schlager.

The album was produced by former Grapes of Wrath band member, Vincent Jones. Anselmi and Jones were able to secure Depeche Mode singer Dave Gahan for the lead track, "Nostalgia". Additional performers and collaborators include singer Laure-Elaine, actress Frances Lawson, actor Joe Dallesandro, painter/actor Ronan Boyle, synthesist Phil Western, pianist Mike Garson, guitarist Knox Chandler, media artist and musician Haig Armen, and film director Sean Starke.

== Video ==
A video for the opening track, "Nostalgia", was filmed on location in Poland and the Czech Republic. It combines archival footage with a live action performance by Gahan. The video was directed by Sean Starke.

The second video is "Greetings From Nowhere". It stars Frances Lawson performing the album's second song, "Nowhere". It was directed by Thomas Anselmi and Sean Starke, and filmed at the Salton Sea, California. The video contains a monologue not available on the album.
