= Live Monsters (video) =

2004 video by Dave Gahan

Video by Dave Gahan
- Released: 1 March 2004
- Recorded: 5 July 2003
- Venue: Olympia (Paris)
- Genre: Rock; pop; alternative rock
- Label: Mute Films; Rhino Home Video
- Director: Fabien Raymond
- Producer: Dave Gahan

Professional ratings
Review scores
Source	Rating
AllMusic	4.5/5 stars

Live Monsters is a live DVD by English singer Dave Gahan. It was released by Mute Films on 1 March 2004. The DVD was filmed on 5 July 2003 at the Paris Olympia during Gahan's Paper Monsters tour.

Gahan's backup band for the project included keyboardist Vincent Jones.

== Track listing ==
All tracks are written by Dave Gahan and Knox Chandler, except where noted.

No.	Title	Writer(s)	Length
1.	"Hidden Houses"
2.	"Hold On"
3.	"Dirty Sticky Floors"
4.	"A Question of Time"	Martin Gore
5.	"Bitter Apple"
6.	"Black and Blue Again"
7.	"Stay"
8.	"A Little Piece"
9.	"Walking in My Shoes"	Gore
10.	"I Need You"
11.	"Bottle Living"
12.	"Personal Jesus"	Gore
13.	"Goodbye"
14.	"I Feel You"	Gore
15.	"Never Let Me Down Again"	Gore

Bonus material
No.	Title	Length
16.	"Dirty Sticky Floors" (acoustic set from radio promotion appearance)
17.	"Bitter Apple" (acoustic set from radio promotion appearance)
18.	"Black and Blue Again" (acoustic set from radio promotion appearance)
19.	"Live Monsters – A short film"

== Musicians ==
- Dave Gahan – lead vocals; harmonica on "Bottle Living", and "Black and Blue Again"
- Knox Chandler – guitar
- Victor Indrizzo – drums, backing vocals
- Vincent Jones – keyboards, backing vocals
- Martyn LeNoble – bass, backing vocals; double bass on "Stay", and "Black and Blue Again"

== Soundtrack to Live Monsters ==
Soundtrack to Live Monsters

Live album by Dave Gahan
- Released: 7 March 2004
- Recorded: 5 July 2003
- Venue: Olympia (Paris)
- Genre: Rock; pop; alternative rock; pop rock
- Label: Mute
- Producer: Dave Gahan

Dave Gahan chronology
Soundtrack to Live Monsters (2004)	Live from SoHo (2007)

Singles from Soundtrack to Live Monsters
- 1. "A Little Piece" Released: 9 February 2004

Soundtrack to Live Monsters is the first live album by Dave Gahan. It was released exclusively on iTunes by Mute Records on 7 March 2004.

=== Track listing ===
1. "Hidden Houses"
2. "Hold On"
3. "Dirty Sticky Floors"
4. "Bitter Apple"
5. "Black and Blue Again"
6. "Stay"
7. "A Little Piece"
8. "I Need You"
9. "Bottle Living"
10. "Goodbye"

== Charts ==
Chart performance for Live Monsters
Chart (2004)	Peak position
German Albums (Offizielle Top 100)	46
