= 60 Minutes (disambiguation) =

60 Minutes is an American news television program which premiered on CBS in 1968.

60 Minutes or Sixty Minutes may also refer to:

- Hour
- 60 Minutes II, also known as 60 Minutes Wednesday and 60 Minutes, a second edition of the CBS News program which ran from 1999 to 2005
- 60 Minutes (Australian TV program), a news program, based on the American program of the same title, that premiered in 1979
- 60 Minutes (New Zealand TV programme), a newsmagazine program, based on the American program of the same title, that premiered in 1989
- Sixty Minutes (British TV programme), a short-lived evening news programme which ran on BBC from 1983 until 1984

== See also ==
- 60 Minute Man (architecture)
- Hour (disambiguation)
- "Rixty Minutes", 2014 episode of Rick and Morty
