= Graham Finn =

Irish musician and producer

Graham Finn is an Irish musician and producer.

Finn started his career with the Cork indie rock group Emperor of Ice Cream, before forming the trip-hop/drum-and-bass group Bass Odyssey in the late 1990s. Bass Odyssey provided the theme song ("Twilight") for the RTÉ television programme No Disco, and also contributed a track ("Remote Control Soul") to the soundtrack of the film Deep Blue Sea.

Finn reached #3 in the Irish singles chart in 2000, contributing the music for Brendan O'Connor's comedy single "Who's in the House?", which the collective had recorded under the name Father Brian and the Fun Loving Cardinals.

Finn now lives in New York. He contributed to Dave Gahan's solo album Hourglass in 2007. He has also worked with Northern Irish singer-songwriter Dan Donnelly in the New York-based group Sonovagun.
