= Hourglass: Remixes =

Remix album by Dave Gahan
- Released: 11 March 2008 (North America)
- Recorded: 2007–2008
- Genre: Rock; alternative dance; electronic; house
- Length: 54:32
- Label: Mute; Virgin
- Producer: Dave Gahan; Andrew Phillpott; Christian Eigner

Dave Gahan chronology
Live from SoHo (2007)	Hourglass: Remixes (2008)	The Light the Dead See (2012)

Hourglass: Remixes is a remix album by English singer Dave Gahan. It was released by Mute Records on 11 March 2008 in North America.

== Track listing ==
Vinyl album

1. "Deeper & Deeper" (Juan Maclean Club mix)
2. "Kingdom" (Booka Shade Club remix)
3. "Love Will Leave" (Kap10Kurt mix)
4. "Use You" (Maps remix)
5. "Deeper & Deeper" (T. Raumschmiere remix extended)
6. "Kingdom" (Digitalism remix)
7. "Saw Something" (Onur Ozer)
8. "Deeper & Deeper" (Sebastien Leger remix)

Bonus CD

1. "Deeper & Deeper" (Juan Maclean Club mix)
2. "Kingdom" (Booka Shade Club remix)
3. "Love Will Leave" (Kap10Kurt mix)
4. "Use You" (Maps remix)
5. "Deeper & Deeper" (T. Raumschmiere remix extended)
6. "Kingdom" (Digitalism remix)
7. "Saw Something" (Onur Ozer)
8. "Deeper & Deeper" (Sebastien Leger remix)
9. "Kingdom" (Rosario's Big Room vocal)
10. "Saw Something" (Skreamix)
11. "Deeper & Deeper" (SHRUBBN!! FX instrumental)
