= Hourglass (disambiguation) =

An hourglass is one of the oldest devices for measuring time.

Hourglass or hour glass may also refer to:

- Hourglass shape

== Music ==
- Hour Glass (band), a 1960s rock band featuring Duane and Gregg Allman

=== Albums ===
- Hourglass (America album), 1994
- Hourglass (Dave Gahan album), 2007
  - Hourglass: Remixes, by Dave Gahan, 2008
- Hourglass (Fayray album), 2004
- Hour Glass (Hour Glass album), 1967
- Hourglass (James Taylor album), 1997
- Hourglass (Kate Rusby album), 1997
- Hourglass (Mako album), 2016
- Hourglass: The Anthology, a box set by Lamb of God, 2010
- Hourglass, by Athenaeum, 2002
- Hourglass, by Glass Harp, 2003
- The Hourglass, an EP by Leæther Strip packaged with their album The Giant Minutes to the Dawn, 2007
- Hourglass, Song by Clique Productions, 2023

=== Songs ===
- "Hourglass" (Clannad song), 1989
- "Hourglass" (Disclosure song), 2015
- "Hourglass" (Squeeze song), 1987
- "Hourglass", by At The Drive-In from In/Casino/Out, 1998
- "Hourglass", by Catfish and the Bottlemen from The Balcony, 2014
- "Hourglass", by Erra from Drift, 2016
- "Hourglass", by Lamb of God from Ashes of the Wake, 2004
- "Hourglass", by Liquid Tension Experiment from Liquid Tension Experiment 2, 1999
- "Hourglass", by Live Alien Broadcast, 1999
- "Hourglass", by Local Natives from Time Will Wait for No One, 2023
- "Hourglass", by Motionless in White from Graveyard Shift, 2017
- "Hourglass", by Of Mice & Men from Another Miracle, 2025
- "Hourglass", by P-Model from Karkador, 1985
- "Hourglass", by A Perfect Circle from Eat the Elephant, 2018
- "Hourglass", by Queensrÿche from Condition Hüman, 2015
- "The Hourglass", by Savatage from The Wake of Magellan, 1998

== Arts and entertainment ==
- "Hourglass" (Smallville), an episode of the American television series Smallville
- Hour Glass (TV series), a 1946–1947 television variety show
- Hourglass (film), a 1984 Soviet melodrama film
- The Hour-Glass, a 1905 painting by Evelyn De Morgan
- Hourglass, a 1995 film directed by C. Thomas Howell
- "Hourglass", a 2004 episode from season 3 of Alias
- Das Stundenglas, a 1990 German text adventure game

== Books ==
- Hourglass (Gray novel), a 2010 novel by Claudia Gray
- Hourglass (Kiš novel), a 1972 novel by Danilo Kiš
- The Hourglass, a supervillain character from the 2008 film, Superhero Movie

== Space ==
- Engraved Hourglass Nebula, a planetary nebula
- Hourglass Nebula, part of the Lagoon Nebula
- Hourglass Sea, an early name for Syrtis Major Planum, a feature of Mars

== Fashion ==
- Hourglass corset, a type of undergarment
- Hourglass figure, a description of a female body shape
- The Hour Glass (company), luxury watch company

== Zoology ==
- Hourglass dolphin (Lagenorynchus cruciger), a small dolphin found in Antarctic and sub-Antarctic waters
- Hourglass toad or Cross toad (Leptophryne borbonica), a species of toad native to southeast Asia

== Other ==
- Hourglass (newspaper), a free monthly British newspaper published by Extinction Rebellion
- Hourglass Device, a United States military award, attached to the Armed Forces Reserve Medal
- Hourglass Field, a landing field outside San Diego, California, United States
- Hourglass formation, a type of formation in modern western square dance
- Hourglass model, to explain the phylotypic stage in evolutionary developmental biology
- The translation of שְׁעוֹן הַחוֹל (pronounced Sha'on HaḤol) the project name for the Egypt–Israel barrier

== See also ==
- Sandglass (disambiguation)
