= Where It Goes =

Studio album by Lori Carson
- Released: 1995
- Studio: Power Station
- Length: 44:14
- Label: Restless
- Producer: Anton Fier

Lori Carson chronology
Shelter (1990)	Where It Goes (1995)	Everything I Touch Runs Wild (1997)

Where It Goes is the second solo album by the American musician Lori Carson, released in 1995. Carson supported the album with a solo acoustic tour as well as a tour with the Golden Palominos, of which she was a member. "You Won't Fall" was included on the soundtrack to the film Stealing Beauty.

== Production ==
Recorded at Power Station, in New York City, the album was produced by Anton Fier; Carson had considered working with him on her DGC Records debut. Unlike their work on Golden Palominos albums, Carson and Fier chose spare arrangements and instrumentation. Most of the songs are about the dissolution of a romantic relationship.

== Critical reception ==
Professional ratings
Review scores
Source	Rating
AllMusic	4/5 stars
The Atlanta Journal-Constitution	4/4 stars
Rolling Stone	3.5/5 stars
The Virgin Encyclopedia of Nineties Music	3/5 stars

Trouser Press wrote that the album "is grave and serious, sung with aching intensity and arranged with drawing-room sophistication." The Sun Sentinel noted that "Carson has pared down the music to low acoustic levels so that her delicate voice and vision pierce through... It's a beautiful downer." The Washington Post deemed Where It Goes "polished and pretty, if a bit commonplace." Rolling Stone said that "this is an intimate late-night album of amatory post-mortems, with elegant ballads and art songs surveying the debris with a sharp, unforgiving eye." LA Weekly determined that Carson's voice is "rather small but blessedly free of soul-and-fire affectation." The Atlanta Journal-Constitution called the songs "internal landscapes as soundtracks to a larger consciousness". The Rocket labeled Carson's soprano "the voice of a slightly disturbed and weary angel".

== Track listing ==
No.	Title	Length
1.	"Down Here"	4:18
2.	"Waking to the Dream of You"	4:27
3.	"You Won't Fall"	4:37
4.	"Petal"	5:46
5.	"Twisting My Words"	4:12
6.	"Where It Goes"	3:06
7.	"Through the Cracks"	4:21
8.	"Fell into the Loneliness"	4:02
9.	"Anyday"	5:24
10.	"Christmas"	4:01
Total length:		44:14
