= Hotel at the Waldorf =

Boutique hotel in Vancouver, Canada

Coordinates: 49.28151°N 123.07436°W

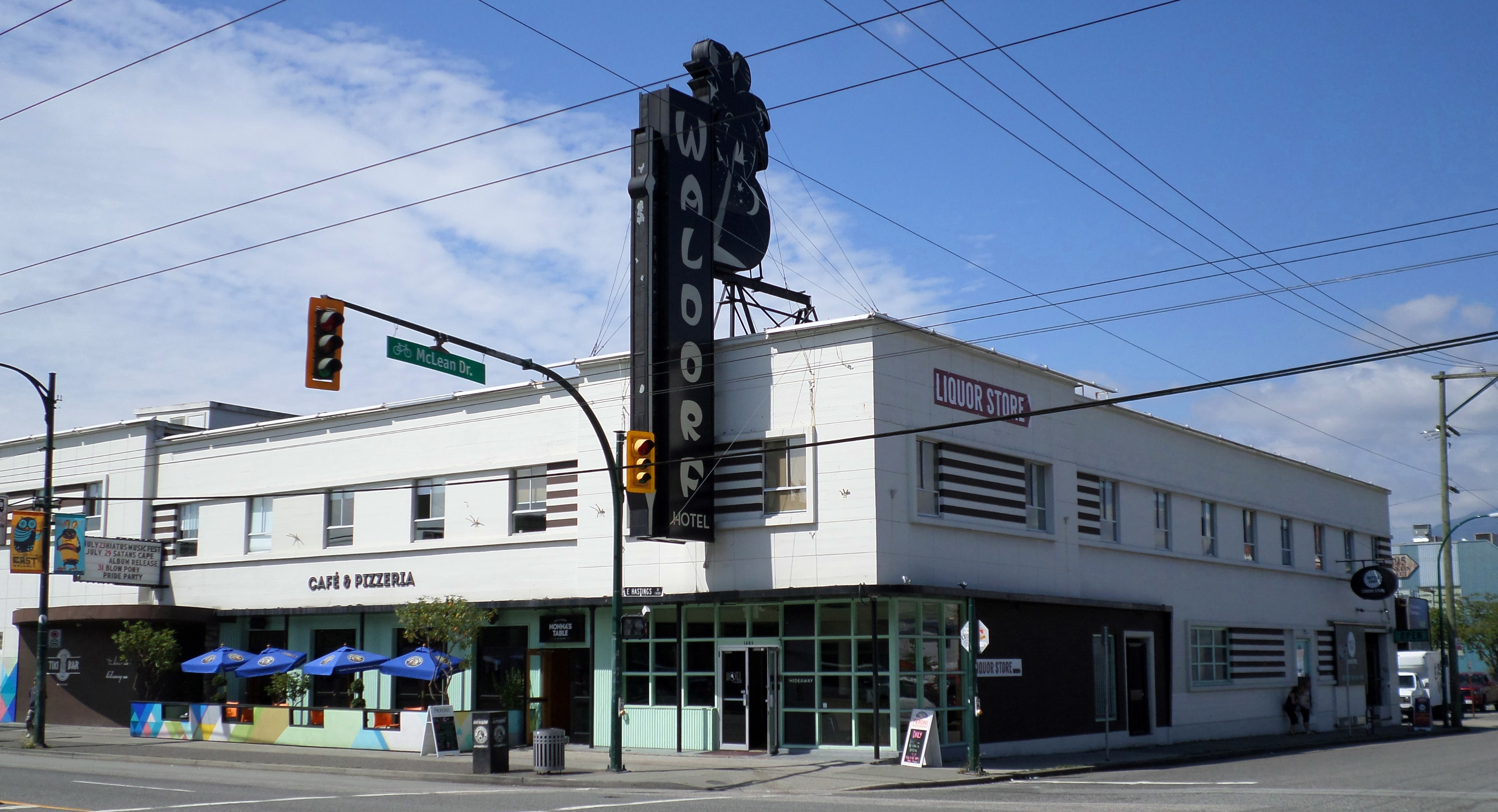
The Waldorf hotel in August 2016

The Hotel at the Waldorf is a boutique hotel in Vancouver, British Columbia, Canada. The hotel was established in 1947 and was one of the most renowned tiki-themed hotels in North America. In 2010, Thomas Anselmi and Ernesto Gomez took over operations and the hotel was renovated into a boutique hotel. The building was home to one of Vancouver's most popular music venues until January 2013 when it was sold to Solterra with plans to rezone the property and make way for condominiums. There was a public outcry to save the land, building and cultural institution that included a petition that received 23,000 signatures. In response, Vancouver mayor Gregor Robertson issued a public statement decrying the loss, which critics denounced as a "sentimental bid for hipster votes."
