= Everything I Touch Runs Wild =

Studio album by Lori Carson
- Released: March 25, 1997
- Genres: Alternative rock, trip-hop
- Length: 47:53
- Label: Restless
- Producer: Lori Carson

Lori Carson chronology
Where It Goes (1995)	Everything I Touch Runs Wild (1997)	Stars (1999)

Singles from Everything I Touch Runs Wild
- 1. "Something's Got Me"; 2. "I Saw The Light"

Everything I Touch Runs Wild is the third solo album by American singer-songwriter Lori Carson. It was released on March 25, 1997, by Restless Records.

== Recording and production ==
It was self-produced by Carson, and recorded at her Sixth Avenue apartment in New York City. Additional sessions took place at the Power Station, Greenpoint Studio and the Knitting Factory. Carson reflected in a November 1997 interview, "I think there were challenges not because of producing it per se, but because I was doing it in my apartment. There were challenges of being able to hear things well and to set everything up so that it sounded good. There are definitely problems on the lower end on my record. Recording the bass in my apartment probably was not a good idea. There are mistakes because I didn't know any better. That said, I don't regret any part of the process. I even like the aspects of it that are more fucked up." Regarding the choice of album art, Carson stated, "I decided to do it in a moment of rebelliousness. I just didn't want people to look at the cover and say, 'Oh yeah, here's another quiet, introspective folk singer.'"

== Reception ==
Professional ratings
Review scores
Source	Rating
AllMusic	4.5/5 stars
Entertainment Weekly	A−
Los Angeles Times	3/4 stars

AllMusic's Greg Prato praised the album, stating "the underrated singer/songwriter Lori Carson offers her barest, most personal compositions yet. One reason for this direction was due in part to recording the entire album in her own apartment, as well as to Carson producing it herself. By combining her soothing, gentle vocals with an acoustic backing, the results are often both irresistibly sweet and engaging." In his April 1997 review, Entertainment Weekly's Rob Brunner wrote, "She never raises her voice, but on her third solo album, the ex-Golden Palomino achieves an emotional depth that rivals most from-the-gut belters. Singers who mistake volume for passion (think Alanis) can learn from Carson." The Tampa Bay Times remarked that the album was "the best summation yet of her sensual ways", while Sara Scribner of the Los Angeles Times labelled it "Sultry, smooth, intoxicating and disturbed." Richard Harrington of The Washington Post wrote in his review, "'Something's Got Me' sucks the listener in like an emotional undertow and the songs that follow emerge from the same slipstream of melancholy."

The Dallas Observer and Nashville Scene included it on their best albums of 1997 lists.

== Track listing ==
All tracks are written by Lori Carson, except where noted.

No.	Title	Writer(s)	Length
1.	"Something's Got Me"		5:30
2.	"Make a Little Luck"		4:17
3.	"Black Thumb"		4:54
4.	"Snow Come Down"		4:34
5.	"Whole Heart"		5:30
6.	"Fade"		4:38
7.	"Souvenir"	Carson, Knox Chandler	4:26
8.	"Train"		5:14
9.	"Greener"		3:21
10.	"I Saw the Light"	Todd Rundgren	3:50
11.	"Something's Got Me (Original)"		5:00

=== Bonus remix disc ===
No.	Title	Writer(s)	Length
12.	"Something's Got Me (Curse of the Voodoo Swamp Mix (Extended Version))"		6:15
13.	"Something's Got Me (Think Slink Mix)"		3:21
14.	"I Saw the Light (Homegrown Fantasy Mix)"	Rundgren	3:50
15.	"Something's Got Me (Instant Drip Hop Mix)"		6:16
Total length:			73:24
