= Sandglass =

A sandglass is a device for measuring time, including:

- Hourglass
- Marine sandglass
- Egg timer

It can also refer to:

- Sandglass (TV series), a 1995 Korean drama series

== See also ==
- Hourglass (disambiguation)
- Sandglaz, a task management app and competitor of Astrid and Wunderlist
