= Hour (disambiguation) =

An hour is a unit of measurement of time.

(The) Hour(s) may also refer to:

== Measurement ==
- Hour angle, the measurement of angle in units of hours
  - Right ascension, the astronomical unit of measure of angle
- light hour or hour, distance equivalent to that travelled by light in vacuum in one hour

=== Time ===
- Decimal hour, an alternate form of hour time
- Carnegie Unit and Student Hour or credit-hours, a measurement of completed coursework at a college or university.
- man-hour or hour, a measurement of work done by people
- hour unit in time-based currency
- hour meter or hours, a device of measuring hours of usage
- hour hand or hour, a arm on a clock
- Chinese hour in traditional Chinese timekeeping

== Religion ==
- Canonical hours or liturgical hours, divisions of the day in Christianity
  - Book of Hours, a printed book or often a manuscript containing prayers for such hours (e.g., the "Hours of Catherine of Cleves")
- Day of Resurrection, the Day of Judgement in Islam, also known as "The Hour"
- Horae (Hours), deities in Greek mythology, goddesses of the seasons
- Relative hour in Judaism, a variable length hour by splitting daylight and nighttime into 12 hour segments each

== Art, entertainment, and media ==
- The Hours (engraving), by Francesco Bartolozzi, based on a painting by Maria Cosway

=== Literature ===
- The Hours (novel), a 1998 novel by Michael Cunningham
- Mrs Dalloway, a novel by Virginia Woolf that had the working title "The Hours"

==== Periodicals ====
- The Hour (newspaper), a daily newspaper by in Norwalk, Connecticut, U.S.
- Hour Community, a weekly entertainment newspaper published in Montreal, earlier known as Hour

=== Television ===
- Hour Magazine, a 1980–1988 syndicated talk show hosted by Gary Collins
- The Hour (2009 TV programme), a 2009–2011 Scottish early evening lifestyle television programme, broadcast on STV
- The Hour (2011 TV series), a 2011–2012 British television drama series set in 1956 that aired on BBC
- George Stroumboulopoulos Tonight, a 2005–2014 Canadian late-night talk show known from 2005 to 2010 as The Hour

=== Films ===
- The Hours (film), a 2002 drama film directed by Stephen Daldry
- Hours (2013 film), a 2013 thriller film

=== Music ===
- The Hours (opera), 2022 opera by Kevin Puts

==== Bands ====
- The Hours (band), an English rock band
- Band of the Hour, a marching band of University of Miami in Coral Gables, Florida, USA

==== Albums ====
- Hours (David Bowie album), a 1999 album by British musician David Bowie
- Hours (Funeral for a Friend album), a 2005 album by Welsh rock band Funeral for a Friend
- The Hours (soundtrack), the soundtrack composed by Philip Glass to the film of the same name
- Humanity: Hour I, 2007 album by the Scorpions

==== Songs ====
- "Hours", a song by TV on the Radio from the album Return to Cookie Mountain
- "The Hours", a song by Beach House from the album Bloom
- "The Hours", a song by Handsome Boy Modeling School from the album White People
- "Hour I", 2007 song by the Scorpions off the eponymous album Humanity: Hour I

== Places ==
- Hours, Pyrénées-Atlantiques, a commune in France
- Hour, a part of the Walloon municipality of Houyet in Belgium
- Hour, Iran

== Sports ==
- Hour record, the hour-long bicycle race
- One hour run, the athletics event

== See also ==
- Hourglass (disambiguation)
- H-Hour
