= Bottle Living / Hold On =

"Bottle Living" / "Hold On"

Single by Dave Gahan

from the album Paper Monsters
- Released: 27 October 2003
- Recorded: 2003
- Studio: Electric Lady (New York City)
- Genre: Rock
- Length: 3:31 ("Bottle Living"), 3:52 ("Hold On")
- Label: Mute
- Songwriter(s): Dave Gahan; Knox Chandler
- Producer(s): Ken Thomas

Dave Gahan singles chronology
"I Need You" (2003)	"Bottle Living" / "Hold On" (2003)	"A Little Piece" (live) (2004)

"Bottle Living" / "Hold On" are two songs by English singer Dave Gahan, released on 27 October 2003 as a double A-side single from his debut studio album, Paper Monsters (2003), serving as the album's third and final single. The single release of "Hold On" is a "radio mix" and has a slightly faster pace and more prominent rhythm track than that of the more placid album version of the song.

The UK limited-edition CD maxi single contains a remixed version of "Hidden Houses", another album track, as a B-side.

== Track listings ==
- UK CD single (CDMUTE310)
1. "Bottle Living" (album version) – 3:32
2. "Hold On" (radio mix) – 3:52
3. "Bottle Living" (Tomcraft vocal mix) – 7:47
- UK limited-edition CD single (LCDMUTE310)
1. "Bottle Living" (Machine Head lyric mix) – 6:04
2. "Bottle Living" (T. Raumschmiere vocal mix) – 5:19
3. "Hidden Houses" (Alexander Kowalski remix) – 5:15
- UK DVD single (DVDMUTE310)
1. "Bottle Living" (video) – 3:32
2. "Bottle Living" (Tomcraft dub mix) – 7:48
3. "Bottle Living" (Machine Head synth mix) – 6:29
- US CD maxi single (42671-2)
1. "Bottle Living" (album version) – 3:32
2. "Bottle Living" (Tomcraft vocal mix) – 7:47
3. "Bottle Living" (Machine Head lyric mix) – 6:04
4. "Bottle Living" (T. Raumschmiere vocal mix) – 5:19
5. "Hidden Houses" (Alexander Kowalski remix) – 5:15
6. "Hold On" (radio mix) – 3:52
- German limited-edition 3-inch CD single (CDMUTE310P)
1. "Bottle Living" (album version) – 3:32
2. "Hold On" (radio mix) – 3:52

== Charts ==
Weekly chart performance for "Bottle Living" / "Hold On"
Chart (2003)	Peak position
Germany (GfK)	19
Hungary (Single Top 40)	4
Scotland (OCC)	48
UK Singles (OCC)	36
US Dance Singles Sales (Billboard)	13

== Release history ==
Region	Date	Label
United Kingdom	27 October 2003	Mute
Germany	3 November 2003	Mute
United States	4 November 2003	Reprise
