= The Seven Year Itch (Siouxsie and the Banshees album) =

Live album by Siouxsie and the Banshees
- Released: 19 May 2003
- Recorded: 9–10 July 2002
- Venue: Shepherd's Bush Empire, London
- Genre: Post-punk
- Label: Sanctuary
- Producer: Siouxsie and the Banshees

Siouxsie and the Banshees chronology
The Best of Siouxsie and the Banshees (2002)	The Seven Year Itch (2003)	Downside Up (2004)

Professional ratings
Review scores
Source	Rating
AllMusic	4.5/5 stars
The Guardian	4/5 stars
The Rolling Stone Album Guide	4/5 stars
Uncut	4/5 stars

The Seven Year Itch is a live album by Siouxsie and the Banshees, composed of performances recorded at London's Shepherd's Bush Empire on 9 and 10 July 2002 and released by Sanctuary Records in 2003 (on CD, double-LP vinyl, VHS and DVD formats).

== Background, content and release ==
Years after the breakup of the Banshees, the three core members (Siouxsie Sioux, Steven Severin and Budgie) plus final Banshees guitarist Knox Chandler reunited for an abbreviated tour of the US and UK in 2002. The title referred to the fact that Siouxsie and the Banshees had not played together in seven years before embarking on this final tour of their career. It was also a nod to Billy Wilder's film The Seven Year Itch.

Seven Year Itch was the band's second live album, the first being 1983's Nocturne. For the performances, Siouxsie and the Banshees concentrated not on radio hits, but on both popular and obscure B-sides and album tracks, many pulled from their early albums. The album also featured a one-off rendition of the Beatles' "Blue Jay Way", played in memory of George Harrison, who died in November 2001.

The CD and double-LP vinyl mainly featured live versions recorded on the first night on 9 July 2002, while the DVD only captured the second night on 10 July.

== Track listing ==
1. "Pure"
2. "Jigsaw Feeling"
3. "Metal Postcard (Mittageisen)"
4. "Red Light"
5. "Lullaby"
6. "Lands End"
7. "I Could Be Again"
8. "Icon"
9. "Night Shift"
10. "Voodoo Dolly"
11. "Trust in Me"
12. "Blue Jay Way"
13. "Monitor"
14. "Peek-a-Boo"

== DVD ==
1. "Pure"
2. "Jigsaw Feeling"
3. "Metal Postcard"
4. "Red Light"
5. "Happy House"
6. "Christine"
7. "Lullaby"
8. "Lands End"
9. "Cities in Dust"
10. "I Could Be Again"
11. "Icon"
12. "Night Shift"
13. "Voodoo Dolly"
14. "Spellbound"
15. "Blue Jay Way"
16. "Monitor"
17. "Peek-a-Boo"

=== DVD Bonus ===
1. Backstage Budgie
2. Getting Ready to Scratch (soundchecks and more)

== Personnel ==
Siouxsie and the Banshees

- Siouxsie Sioux - vocals
- Steven Severin - bass
- Budgie - drums
- Knox Chandler - guitar
