= I Need You (Dave Gahan song) =

Single by Dave Gahan

from the album Paper Monsters
- B-side: "Closer"; "Breathe"
- Released: 18 August 2003
- Recorded: 2003
- Studio: Electric Lady (New York City)
- Genre: Rock; synth-pop
- Length: 4:45
- Label: Mute
- Songwriters: Dave Gahan; Knox Chandler
- Producer: Ken Thomas

Dave Gahan singles chronology
"Dirty Sticky Floors" (2003)	"I Need You" (2003)	"Bottle Living" / "Hold On" (2003)

"I Need You" is a song by English singer Dave Gahan from his debut studio album, Paper Monsters (2003). It was released on 18 August 2003 as the album's second single, reaching number 27 on the UK Singles Chart. The song was completely remixed by Alan Moulder for its single release, with new vocals and a new musical structure, being quicker and cleaner than the album version.

== Track listings ==
- UK CD single (CDMUTE301)
1. "I Need You" (radio mix) – 3:40
2. "Closer" – 4:05
3. "Breathe" – 4:50
- UK limited-edition CD single (LCDMUTE301)
1. "I Need You" (Ladytron detoxxMixx) – 4:00
2. "I Need You" (Gabriel & Dresden Unplugged mix) – 9:39
3. "I Need You" (Jay's Summerdub) – 6:17
- UK DVD single (DVDMUTE301)
1. "Black and Blue Again" (acoustic) (video) – 5:00
2. "I Need You" (Ladytron detoxxMixx – instrumental) – 3:59
3. "Dirty Sticky Floors" (Lexicon Avenue Dirty Sticky dub) – 8:31
- UK 12-inch single (12MUTE301) – released 1 September 2003

A. "I Need You" (Gabriel & Dresden Unplugged mix) – 10:15
AA. "I Need You" (Gabriel & Dresden Plugged dub) – 10:16

- UK limited-edition 12-inch single (L12MUTE301) – released 1 September 2003

A. "I Need You" (Jay's Summerdub) – 6:16
AA1. "I Need You" (Ladytron detoxxMixx) – 3:59
AA2. "I Need You" (Ladytron detoxxMixx – instrumental) – 3:59

- US CD single (42643–2)
1. "I Need You" (radio mix) – 3:33
2. "Closer" – 4:08
3. "Breathe" – 4:56
4. "I Need You" (Ladytron detoxxMixx) – 4:01
5. "I Need You" (Jay's Summerdub) – 6:25
6. "I Need You" (Gabriel & Dresden Unplugged mix) – 10:13
- US 12-inch single (0–42643)

A. "I Need You" (Gabriel & Dresden Unplugged mix) – 10:13
B1. "I Need You" (Ladytron detoxxMixx) – 4:01
B2. "I Need You" (Jay's Summerdub) – 6:25
C. "I Need You" (Gabriel & Dresden Plugged dub) – 10:13
D1. "Dirty Sticky Floors" (Lexicon Avenue Dirty Sticky dub) – 8:39
D2. "I Need You" (Ladytron detoxxMixx instrumental) – 3:59

== Credits and personnel ==
- Design – Four5One*Creative*
- Engineer [Mix] – Jack Clark
- Engineer [Recording] – Jonathan Adler
- Mixed by – Ken Thomas
- Photography By, Artwork [Dave Gahan Logo] – Anton Corbijn
- Programmed By – Jon Collyer
- Programmed By [Additional] – Knox Chandler
- Written-By – Dave Gahan, Knox Chandler

== Charts ==
Chart (2003)	Peak position
Belgium Dance (Ultratop Flanders)	30
Belgium Dance (Ultratop Wallonia)	30
Denmark (Tracklisten)	15
Germany (GfK)	23
Hungary (Single Top 40)	2
Italy (FIMI)	35
Scotland Singles (OCC)	32
Spain (Promusicae)	11
Sweden (Sverigetopplistan)	55
UK Singles (OCC)	27
US Dance Club Songs (Billboard)	5
US Dance Singles Sales (Billboard)	8

== Release history ==
Region	Date	Label
United Kingdom	18 August 2003	Mute
United States	19 August 2003	Reprise
