= Kingdom (Dave Gahan song) =

Single by Dave Gahan

from the album Hourglass
- B-side: "Tomorrow"
- Released: 8 October 2007
- Recorded: 2007
- Studio: 11th Floor (New York City)
- Genre: Industrial rock; electroclash
- Length: 4:34
- Label: Mute
- Songwriters: Dave Gahan; Christian Eigner; Andrew Phillpott
- Producers: Dave Gahan; Christian Eigner; Andrew Phillpott

Dave Gahan singles chronology
"A Little Piece" (live) (2004)	"Kingdom" (2007)	"Saw Something" / "Deeper and Deeper" (2008)

Alternative cover
- 12-inch single and limited-edition CD maxi single cover

Music video
- "Kingdom" on YouTube

"Kingdom" is a song by Depeche Mode vocalist Dave Gahan from his second solo studio album, Hourglass (2007). The song was released on 8 October 2007 as the album's lead single. The single version removed the third stanza of the first verse, the instrumental part preceding the second chorus, and most of the bridge at the end.

== Airplay ==
The song received increasing airplay on US alternative rock radio throughout the month of September 2007 and became one of the 100 most played modern rock songs in the US in mid-September. Major support came from WEQX (Albany, New York) and KNRK (Portland, Oregon). In late September 2007, Alt Nation (Sirius Satellite Radio), Ethel (XM Satellite Radio), and KDLD (Los Angeles) offered airplay to the song. By late September, the song was receiving airplay from 21 US modern rock stations. By mid-October, the number had grown to 29 stations and the song had become one of the 75-most-played. In the UK, however, a week after release on CD, the single peaked at number 44, meaning that it charted lower than any of Gahan's CD-format singles from his debut album, Paper Monsters. More success was achieved in mainland Europe, however, with the song reaching the top 10 in Germany and Italy, and the top position in Spain. The song was also featured in the episode "The Ringer" of the CBS series Moonlight, which first aired on 10 November 2007, and was also included in the soundtrack album for the 2008 film Lost Boys: The Tribe.

=== Promotion ===
Jaron Albertin directed the video for "Kingdom". The single was played on radio stations from 27 August 2007, the day the track was available for digital download from iTunes. Clips of the song were first broadcast on Gahan's YouTube channel during his second web greeting on 21 August 2007.

== Track listings ==
- European CD single

(CDMUTE393; released 8 October 2007)

1. "Kingdom" (single version) – 3:30
2. "Tomorrow" – 5:13
- European limited-edition enhanced CD maxi single

(LCDMUTE393; released 8 October 2007)

1. "Kingdom" (single version) – 3:33
2. "Kingdom" (Digitalism remix) – 5:37
3. "Kingdom" (Booka Shade club mix) – 7:40
4. "Kingdom" (K10K extended mix) – 6:35
5. "Kingdom" (music video)
- European limited-edition 7-inch picture disc

(MUTE393; released 8 October 2007)

A. "Kingdom" (single version) – 3:30
B. "Tomorrow" – 5:13

- European 12-inch single

(12MUTE393; released 29 October 2007)

A1. "Kingdom" (Digitalism remix) – 5:36
A2. "Kingdom" (Digitalism dub)
AA1. "Kingdom" (Booka Shade club mix) – 7:39
AA2. "Kingdom" (Booka Shade dub mix)

- European limited-edition 12-inch single

(L12MUTE393; released 26 November 2007)

A. "Kingdom" (Ralphi + Jody's extended vocal) – 9:44
B. "Kingdom" (Rosario's Big Room vocal) – 8:25

- Digital single

(Released 27 August 2007)

1. "Kingdom" (single version) – 3:33
- Digital single

(Released 8 October 2007)

1. "Kingdom" (studio session) – 4:50
- Digital EP

(Released 8 October 2007)

1. "Kingdom" (single version) – 3:33
2. "Kingdom" (Digitalism remix) – 5:36
3. "Kingdom" (Booka Shade club mix) – 7:39
4. "Kingdom" (K10K extended mix) – 6:36

== Charts ==
=== Weekly charts ===
Weekly chart performance for "Kingdom"
Chart (2007–2008)	Peak position
Austria (Ö3 Austria Top 40)	41
Belgium (Ultratop 50 Flanders)	9
Belgium (Ultratop 50 Wallonia)	16
Denmark (Tracklisten)	3
Germany (GfK)	10
Global Dance Tracks (Billboard)	36
Italy (FIMI)	4
Scotland (OCC)	15
Spain (PROMUSICAE)	1
Sweden (Sverigetopplistan)	37
UK Singles (OCC)	44
US Dance Club Songs (Billboard)	1

=== Year-end charts ===
Year-end chart performance for "Kingdom"
Chart (2008)	Position
US Dance Club Songs (Billboard)	10

== See also ==
- List of number-one dance singles of 2008 (U.S.)
