= Lori Carson =

American singer-songwriter

- Born: Lori E. Carson; March 2, 1958 (age 68); Queens, New York City
- Genres: Alternative country; contemporary folk; trip hop; ambient; jazz
- Occupations: Musician; singer-songwriter
- Instruments: Vocals; guitar
- Years active: 1990–present
- Labels: Geffen/DGC; Restless; Rykodisc; One Little Indian; Meta
- Formerly of: The Golden Palominos
- Website: lclifeandmusic.com

Lori E. Carson (born March 2, 1958) is an American singer-songwriter whose albums include Shelter (1990), Where it Goes (1995), Everything I Touch Runs Wild (1997) and Another Year (2012). A former member of the seminal band The Golden Palominos, she has contributed to soundtracks including Bernardo Bertolucci's Stealing Beauty, Kathryn Bigelow's Strange Days, and Keith Gordon's Waking the Dead.

Her debut novel, The Original 1982, was published by William Morrow/HarperCollins in June 2013.

After a long hiatus, In November of 2025 Lori released an EP, Sing to the Ghosts, available only on her website and on Bandcamp.

== Career history ==
Carson began performing in the mid-eighties at Folk City, The Bitter End, and other clubs on or around Bleecker Street. She was signed to a development deal with Manhattan Records in 1987, and to a recording contract with Geffen Records in 1988.

Shelter, produced by Hal Willner, was released in 1990 to excellent reviews. It featured a duet with Gregg Allman. In support of the record, Carson toured as part of a trio (Rachelle Garnier on accordion and Paul Pimsler on guitar) opening for Joe Jackson in Canada and the U.S. In 1991, she was dropped from the label.

Playing a show in New York City later that year, Carson was approached by drummer/producer Anton Fier to collaborate on a new project that became 1992's This is How it Feels by The Golden Palominos. Pure by the Palominos was released the following year and featured Carson's song "Little Suicides".

Carson signed to Restless records in 1994, and Where It Goes (produced by Fier) was released in 1995. She toured extensively in support of the record, often accompanied by Paul Pimsler and cellist Jane Scarpantoni. She opened for Counting Crows as a soloist, facing their hit-hungry audiences with only an acoustic guitar. On tour in Asia, she learned that Bernardo Bertolucci wanted to license "You Won't Fall" for his film Stealing Beauty. She received an offer to co-write a song for Kathryn Bigelow's Strange Days with composer Graeme Revell.

Everything I Touch Runs Wild was released in 1997. Recorded in her New York City apartment, the record received great press. It made many top ten lists nationally and was named Record of the Year by the Long Island Village Voice.

In 1998, Carson moved from New York City to Seattle and recorded Stars with Layng Martine III and Joe Ferla as co-producers. Released in 1999, it was her last record for Restless.

House in the Weeds, a lo-fi, limited edition of only two thousand copies, was made available in 2001. Rykodisc released Stolen Beauty, a compilation of Carson's film and TV contributions that year as well.

In 2002 Janet Rienstra of Meta Records asked Carson to compose a song-cycle that would work in the context of yoga or meditation. The Finest Thing was the result. Released by Meta in 2004, it was featured by NPR that summer on Echoes. One Little Indian picked it up for release in Europe in 2005.

Carson's most recent record is Another Year (Blue Kitchen Music/ United for Opportunity, 2012). In June 2013 her debut novel, The Original 1982, was published by William Morrow/HarperCollins. In 2016 Carson cofounded the small press 3 a.m. analog to publish "fiction and creative nonfiction of musicians and songwriters" including Jesse Harris, Matt Keating (musician), and Sylvie Simmons.

== Personal life ==
Carson was born in Queens, New York and grew up in Bethpage. She has a younger brother and sister. Her mother, Edith, was a schoolteacher. Her father, Marvin, now deceased, was an engineer who went to work on Wall Street.

Carson graduated from Plainedge High School in North Massapequa, was a Fine Arts major at FIT in New York City, and attended Hunter College.

She was briefly romantically involved with her Golden Palominos bandmate Anton Fier in the 1990s.

== Discography ==
- 1990 – Shelter (DGC – Geffen)
- 1992 – This Is How It Feels – Golden Palominos (Restless Records)
- 1993 – Pure – The Golden Palominos (Restless)
- 1995 – Where It Goes (Restless)
- 1995 – Strange Days (soundtrack) – "Fall in the Light" with Graeme Revell
- 1996 – Myths of The World (compilation – Rienstra/Laswell)
- 1997 – Everything I Touch Runs Wild (Restless)
- 1999 – Intonarumori – All That Future (with Bernie Worrell) – Bill Laswell/Material (Palm)
- 1999 – Stars (Restless)
- 2001 – House in the Weeds (self-released)
- 2001 – Stolen Beauty (compilation – Rykodisc)
- 2001 – Crazy/Beautiful – "I Want to Believe You" with Paul Haslinger (soundtrack)
- 2001 – The Bellwether Project – Slang
- 2002 – More Talk About Tonight – Slang
- 2003 – Strong Currents – "In the Middle of the Night" with Hector Zazou (compilation)
- 2004 – The Finest Thing (Meta Records)
- 2012 – Another Year (Blue Kitchen/United for Opportunity)
- 2025 - Sing to the Ghosts (self-released)

== Soundtrack appearances ==
- Strange Days – 1995
- Stealing Beauty – 1996
- Keys to Tulsa – 1997
- Grind – 1997
- Niagara, Niagara – 1997
- Broken Vessels – 1998
- Simply Irresistible – 1999
- Waking the Dead – 2000
- Crazy/Beautiful – 2001
- Blue Car – 2002
- Pizza My Heart – 2005
