= Thomas Anselmi =

- Origin: Vancouver, British Columbia, Canada
- Genres: Punk; alternative rock
- Years active: 1985–present
- Member of: Mirror; Slow
- Formerly of: Copyright

Thomas Anselmi was the lead singer with Canadian bands Slow, Copyright (a.k.a. ©), and Mirror. He was one of the partners at The Waldorf Hotel before its closure in 2013.

== Slow ==
Thomas Anselmi was the lead singer of Slow, a Vancouver-based, Canadian punk rock band. The band also featured guitarists Ziggy Sigmund and Christian Thorvaldson, bassist Stephen Hamm and drummer Terry Russell. They recorded and released their debut single, "I Broke the Circle", in 1985 on Zulu Records, and followed up with the EP Against the Glass in 1986.

Slow were involved in a controversial incident which both marred the Expo 86 festivities and effectively ended the band's career. On the opening night of the Festival of Independent Recording Artists, several people who were not attending the concert wandered into the pavilion, witnessed the band's live show which included some partial nudity, and rushed out to complain to Expo management. The officials turned off the power, ending the band's set. Anselmi expressed his displeasure by mooning the audience, and Hamm quickly followed suit, also exposing himself frontally.

The band were detained by the Vancouver police, who considered charging them with indecent exposure. Expo officials initially cancelled the evening's concert, citing security concerns. Some of the fans in attendance got onstage and refused to leave the venue, others began to riot, and yet another group stormed BCTV's onsite studios, where they protested the concert's cancellation so loudly and persistently that the station had to pull its 11:00 p.m. newscast. The following day, Expo announced the cancellation of the whole concert festival. The band subsequently split up.

== Copyright ==
Following the demise of Slow, Anselmi teamed up with Thorvaldson to form the alt rock band © with new bassist Eric Marxsen and drummer Pete Bourne in 1988. Initially, the band spelled its name as the symbol ©, pronounced as "Circle C". Under that name, they released a self-titled debut album on Geffen Records in 1991. That album sold poorly, and the band was dropped from Geffen. After a few years of struggling to continue in the music industry, they were signed to BMG Music, releasing their second album Love Story in 1996 under the name Copyright. The album The Hidden World followed in 2001.

== Mirror ==
After the demise of Copyright, Anselmi spent time in Berlin before settling in Los Angeles. His next project was a multimedia project called Mirror. He spent three years assembling Mirror's self-titled debut album, working in tandem on a multi-media live show. The album was produced by former Grapes of Wrath band member Vincent Jones and released in 2009.

== The Waldorf Hotel ==
In 2010, with Ernesto Gomez, Anselmi leased and renovated The Waldorf Hotel in Vancouver, British Columbia, Canada. He began organizing and promoting events at the venue, including Douglas Coupland, Stan Douglas, Grimes, and Skrillex; the hotel was dubbed "the new cultural headquarters" for the city. In January 2013, following a dispute with the landlord, the building was sold to the Solterra Group with plans to rezone the property and make way for condominiums. The loss of the Waldorf Hotel was described as a "gutting" of Vancouver's arts scene and there was a public outcry to save the land, building and cultural institution that included a petition that received 23,000 signatures. In response, Mayor Gregor Robertson issued a public statement decrying the loss. In March 2013, Anselmi formed the Arrival Agency to continue his event planning work. He then opened the Fox Cabaret, and in 2017 was hired to program events for the newly reopening Railway Club.
