= Dirty Sticky Floors =

Single by Dave Gahan

from the album Paper Monsters
- B-side: "Stand Up"; "Maybe"
- Released: 26 May 2003
- Recorded: 2003
- Studio: Electric Lady (New York City)
- Genre: Rock
- Length: 3:32
- Label: Mute
- Songwriter(s): Dave Gahan; Knox Chandler
- Producer(s): Ken Thomas

Dave Gahan singles chronology
"Dirty Sticky Floors" (2003)	"I Need You" (2003)

"Dirty Sticky Floors" is a song by English singer Dave Gahan from his debut studio album, Paper Monsters (2003). It was released on 26 May 2003 as the album's lead single. The song reached number 18 on the UK Singles Chart and number five on Billboard's Hot Dance Club Play chart. The song was slightly remixed in two different forms for its single release and an extended version for the music video.

== Background ==
In a VH1 interview a week after the single's release, Gahan told Jim Macnie that the song, which poked fun at his addiction, "is all about the so-called glamorous side of rock-'n'-roll, and ending up on some dirty, sticky floor every single night; some god-awful toilet in some club or—most of the time—my own dirty, sticky floor in my own bathroom."

== Track listings ==
- UK CD single (CDMUTE294)
1. "Dirty Sticky Floors" (radio mix, by Alan Moulder) – 3:16
2. "Stand Up" – 5:29
3. "Maybe" – 4:52
- UK limited-edition CD single (LCDMUTE294)
1. "Dirty Sticky Floors" (Junkie XL vocal remix edit) – 7:36
2. "Dirty Sticky Floors" (Lexicon Avenue vocal mix edit) – 6:10
3. "Dirty Sticky Floors" (The Passengerz Dirty club mix edit) – 6:11

Note: The first pressings of the limited-edition CD single incorrectly lists tracks 2 and 3 as being "Stand Up" (Lexicon Avenue vocal mix edit) and "Maybe" (The Passengerz Dirty club mix edit) on the sleeve.

- UK DVD single (DVDMUTE294)
1. "Dirty Sticky Floors" (video) – 3:32
2. "Dirty Sticky Floors" (Junkie XL dub edit) – 7:45
3. "Black and Blue Again" (acoustic) – 4:51
- UK 12-inch single (12MUTE294) – released 9 June 2003

A. "Dirty Sticky Floors" (Junkie XL vocal remix) – 10:48
AA. "Dirty Sticky Floors" (Junkie XL dub) – 12:15

- UK limited-edition 12-inch single (L12MUTE294) – released 9 June 2003

A. "Dirty Sticky Floors" (Lexicon Avenue vocal mix) – 10:31
AA. "Dirty Sticky Floors" (Silencer remix) – 6:38

- US CD maxi single (42620-2)
1. "Dirty Sticky Floors" (radio mix, by Alan Moulder) – 3:14
2. "Dirty Sticky Floors" (Junkie XL vocal remix) – 10:44
3. "Dirty Sticky Floors" (The Passengerz Dirty club remix) – 7:25
4. "Dirty Sticky Floors" (Lexicon Avenue vocal mix) – 10:31
5. "Dirty Sticky Floors" (Silencer remix) – 6:38
6. "Stand Up" – 5:28
7. "Maybe" – 4:52
- US double 12-inch single (0-42620)

A. "Dirty Sticky Floors" (Junkie XL vocal remix) – 10:43
B1. "Dirty Sticky Floors" (The Passengerz Dirty club remix) – 7:24
B2. "Dirty Sticky Floors" (Silencer remix) – 6:43
C. "Dirty Sticky Floors" (Junkie XL dub) – 12:14
D. "Dirty Sticky Floors" (Lexicon Avenue vocal mix) – 10:28

== Credits and personnel ==
- Jack Clark – mix engineering
- Jonathan Adler – recording engineering
- Mike Marsh – mastering
- Ken Thomas – mixing
- Jon Collyer – programming
- Knox Chandler – additional programming

== Charts ==
Chart (2003)	Peak position
Belgium Dance (Ultratop Flanders)	29
Belgium (Ultratip Bubbling Under Wallonia)	7
Belgium Dance (Ultratop Wallonia)	29
Denmark (Tracklisten)	5
Europe (Eurochart Hot 100 Singles)	14
France (SNEP)	57
Germany (GfK)	6
Hungary (Single Top 40)	2
Ireland (IRMA)	40
Italy (FIMI)	7
Scotland (OCC)	26
Sweden (Sverigetopplistan)	18
Switzerland (Schweizer Hitparade)	81
UK Singles (OCC)	18
US Dance Club Songs (Billboard)	3
US Dance Singles Sales (Billboard)	7
