= Saw Something / Deeper and Deeper =

"Saw Something" / "Deeper and Deeper"

Single by Dave Gahan

from the album Hourglass
- B-side: "Love Will Leave"
- Released: 14 January 2008 (CD); 10 December 2007 (digital downlad)
- Recorded: 2007
- Genre: Alternative rock; electropop
- Length: 5:14 ("Saw Something"), 4:34 ("Deeper and Deeper")
- Label: Mute
- Songwriter(s): Dave Gahan; Andrew Phillpott; Christian Eigner
- Producer(s): Dave Gahan; Andrew Phillpott; Christian Eigner

Dave Gahan singles chronology
"Kingdom" (2007)	"Saw Something" / "Deeper and Deeper" (2008)	"All of This and Nothing" (2015)

"Saw Something" / "Deeper and Deeper" are songs performed by Depeche Mode's singer Dave Gahan, co-written and co-produced by Gahan, Andrew Phillpott, and Christian Eigner for Gahan's second solo album Hourglass (2007), released as a double A-side single on 14 January 2008. "Saw Something" features the Red Hot Chili Peppers' member John Frusciante's guitar playing. The song was used in the trailer of the 2009 film Obsessed and the film Claustrum.

== Track listings ==
The European CD and LCD differ only in packaging, the CD being a jewel case and the LCD being card case.

- European CD single – CD MUTE 398/LCD MUTE 398; released 14 January 2008
1. "Saw Something" (single version)
2. "Deeper and Deeper" (Shrubbn!! single version)
3. "Love Will Leave" (Das Shadow's rework)
4. "Deeper and Deeper" (Juan MacLean club mix)
- European 7-inch picture disc – MUTE 398; released 14 January 2008
1. "Saw Something" (single version)
2. "Deeper and Deeper" (Shrubbn!! single version)
- European 12-inch single – 12 MUTE 398; released 14 January 2008
1. "Saw Something" (single version)
2. "Deeper and Deeper" (Juan MacLean dub)
3. "Deeper and Deeper" (Shrubbn!! single version)
4. "Love Will Leave" (Kap10kurt remix)
- Digital download – released 10 December 2007
1. "Saw Something" (single version)
2. "Deeper and Deeper" (Shrubbn!! single version)

== Charts ==
Weekly chart performance for "Saw Something" / "Deeper and Deeper"
Chart (2008)	Peak position
Germany (GfK)	23
Spain (PROMUSICAE)	2
UK Singles (OCC)	103
