= Hourglass (Dave Gahan album) =

Studio album by Dave Gahan
- Released: 17 October 2007
- Recorded: Spring 2007
- Studio: 11th Floor (New York City)
- Length: 48:38
- Label: Mute
- Producers: Dave Gahan; Christian Eigner; Andrew Phillpott

Dave Gahan chronology
Paper Monsters (2003)	Hourglass (2007)	The Light the Dead See (2012)

Singles from Hourglass
- 1. "Kingdom" Released: 8 October 2007; 2. "Saw Something" / "Deeper and Deeper" Released: 14 January 2008

Hourglass is the second solo studio album by English singer Dave Gahan, released on 17 October 2007 by Mute Records. It received generally favourable reviews; most critics complimented its electronica sound, while some criticised it for sounding too similar to Gahan's group Depeche Mode.

== Critical reception ==
Professional ratings
Aggregate scores
Source	Rating
Metacritic	64/100
Review scores
Source	Rating
AllMusic	3.5/5 stars
The A.V. Club	B−
BBC	Positive
The Guardian	4/5 stars
MusicOMH	4.5/5 stars
Now	2/5
Pitchfork	5.7/10
PopMatters	6/10
Rolling Stone	3/5 stars
Uncut	3/5 stars

At Metacritic, which assigns a normalised rating out of 100 to reviews from mainstream critics, the album received an average score of 64, based on 18 critical reviews, which indicates "generally favorable reviews".

Ben Hogwood of musicOMH wrote, "Gahan, it seems, is progressing into a well-rounded, mature songwriter who plays to all his strengths, and in particular the cracked voice, and its ability to move from a confidential whisper to a rabble-rousing bellow. These songs show him in a newly redemptive prime and will satisfy both short and long term devotees".

David Jeffries of AllMusic praised the album and felt it was "a more electronic, better built, and altogether better deal than Monsters, thanks mostly to the singer and-don't-you-forget-to-mention songwriter's better sense of self." "Hourglass doesn't have any overly urgent need to shake off Depeche Mode comparisons. Instead, it surrounds Gahan's serviceable writing skills with the dark electronic soundscapes he's obviously comfortable with." only criticising "Cringe-worthy couplets like "Miracle's "I don't believe in Jesus/But I'm praying anyway." find Gahan writing in the style of Gore and coming up short."

Marc Hawthorne of The A.V Club observed "Dave Gahan's second solo disc should find love from anyone who can recite from memory the albums after Songs Of Faith And Devotion. Everyone else will be indifferent. That doesn't mean it deserves to be ignored—two decades removed from his band's creative peak, Gahan has actually made one of the year's best-sounding electronic releases," concluding, "But when all is said and done, Hourglass simply lacks the exciting moments that got him here. A major exception is "A Little Lie," whose hook is like a mechanized version of the sax in The Psychedelic Furs' "Dumb Waiters." But trapped down at track nine, it feels like an anomaly."

Al Spicer of BBC praised Gahan's vocals saying, "Covering the emotional gamut from tearful regret to sated melancholy - at times with more reverb than strictly necessary - Dave’s voice is the album’s strongest, most memorable facet; the perfect vehicle with which to acknowledge one’s sins, invoke divine protection and beseech forgiveness. Gahan’s control and masterful delivery show that years of the rock star lifestyle left no lasting damage: if anything, the slight rasp of maturity lends an air of authentic experience that his work with Depeche Mode only hinted at."

Caroline Sullivan of The Guardian gave a 4 star rating saying "Dave Gahan's second solo outing is reliably bleak, probing the murk of his post-heroin-addiction mind as you'd expect, but achieving a kind of magnificence, too. A return from Paper Monsters' grungy guitars to uncompromising electronica works very well, elevating Gahan's morose thoughts into frigid symphonies. His remarkable voice fills in occasional gaps in the songwriting (the most nagging being a lack of hooks that contrasts unfavourably with the chorus-laden tunes of Depeche Mode's Martin Gore) and induces goosebumps, too."

Benjamin Boles of Now was more negative in his review saying "Depeche Mode frontman David Gahan's second solo disc is closer to the electro-pop vibe of his better known project than that of his first solo outing, for which DM fans will likely be grateful. Unfortunately, he's not as good a songwriter as Martin Gore, and this has a shortage of decent hooks." calling it "a bit of a mopefest" and saying "Some songs start out peppy and intriguing, but his moaning over top sucks all the life out of the groove."concluding, "Hardcore Depeche Mode fans will likely find more to like, but it's hard to imagine any but the most rabid really loving it."

== Track listing ==
All tracks are written by Dave Gahan, Christian Eigner and Andrew Phillpott.

1. "Saw Something" – 5:14
2. "Kingdom" – 4:34
3. "Deeper and Deeper" – 4:34
4. "21 Days" – 4:35
5. "Miracles" – 4:38
6. "Use You" – 4:48
7. "Insoluble" – 4:57
8. "Endless" – 5:47
9. "A Little Lie" – 4:53
10. "Down" – 4:34

=== Bonus tracks ===
All bonus tracks appear on the iTunes edition of Hourglass.

11. "Kingdom" (Digitalism Remix) – 5:36
12. "Use You" (K10K Remix) – 6:03
13. "Deeper and Deeper" (SHRUBBN!! Dub) – 4:43

=== DVD ===
1. "Hourglass – A Short Film" – 17:52
2. "Kingdom" (promotional video) – 4:33
3. "Hourglass – The Studio Sessions" – 20:03
  1. "Saw Something"
  2. "Miracles"
  3. "Kingdom"
  4. "A Little Lie"
  5. "Endless"

== Personnel ==
Credits adapted from the liner notes of Hourglass.

=== Musicians ===
- Dave Gahan – vocals
- John Frusciante – guitar solo (track 1)
- Graham Finn – bass (track 2); guitar (track 4)
- Tony Hoffer – guitar (track 9)
- Niko Stoessl – additional guitar (tracks 2, 6); backing vocals (track 6)
- Kevin Murphy – cello on "Saw Something" (track 1)
- Jenni Muldaur – backing vocals (track 10)
- Karl Ritter – Dobro (track 10)

=== Technical ===
- Dave Gahan – production
- Christian Eigner – production
- Andrew Phillpott – production
- Tony Hoffer – mixing (Note: Mixed at Chung King Studios (New York City)) (all tracks); engineering (track 9)
- Andy Marcinkowski – mixing assistance (all tracks); engineering (track 9)
- Ryan Hewitt – recording (track 1)
- Niko Stoessl – additional editing (tracks 2, 6)
- Kurt Uenala (K10K) – additional editing, additional engineering
- Stephen Marcussen – mastering (Note: Mastered at Marcussen Mastering (Hollywood, California))

=== Artwork ===
- Dave Gahan – design
- Tom Hingston Studio – design
- Anton Corbijn – photography, Hourglass logo design

== Charts ==
Chart performance for Hourglass
Chart (2007)	Peak position
Austrian Albums (Ö3 Austria)	15
Belgian Albums (Ultratop Flanders)	50
Belgian Albums (Ultratop Wallonia)	6
Czech Albums (ČNS IFPI)	9
Danish Albums (Hitlisten)	16
French Albums (SNEP)	18
German Albums (Offizielle Top 100)	2
Hungarian Albums (MAHASZ)	11
Irish Albums (IRMA)	73
Italian Albums (FIMI)	8
Polish Albums (ZPAV)	7
Scottish Albums (Official Charts)	85
Spanish Albums (Promusicae)	18
Swedish Albums (Sverigetopplistan)	24
Swiss Albums (Schweizer Hitparade)	5
UK Albums (Official Charts)	50
US Billboard 200	120
US Top Dance Albums (Billboard)	1

== Certifications and sales ==
Certifications for Hourglass
Region	Certification	Certified units/sales
Poland (ZPAV)	Gold	10,000^{*}
Russia (NFPF)	Gold	10,000^{*}
United States	—	8,000
^{*} Sales figures based on certification alone.

== Release history ==
Release dates and formats for Hourglass
Region	Date	Format	Edition	Label	Cat. no.	Ref.
Japan	17 October 2007	CD	Standard	Toshiba EMI	TOCP-66717	
Europe	22 October 2007	CD	Standard	Mute	CDSTUMM288	
Europe	22 October 2007	LP + CD	Standard	Mute	STUMM288	
Europe	22 October 2007	CD + DVD	Limited	Mute	LCDSTUMM288	
North America	23 October 2007	CD	Standard	Virgin	5099950872121	
North America	23 October 2007	LP + CD	Standard	Virgin	5099950872213	
North America	23 October 2007	CD + DVD	Limited	Virgin	5099950872329	
