= Paper Monsters =

Studio album by Dave Gahan
- Released: 2 June 2003
- Recorded: 2003
- Studio: Electric Lady (New York City)
- Genres: Rock; electronica
- Length: 48:07
- Label: Mute
- Producer: Ken Thomas

Dave Gahan chronology
Paper Monsters (2003)	Hourglass (2007)

Singles from Paper Monsters
- 1. "Dirty Sticky Floors" Released: 26 May 2003; 2. "I Need You" Released: 18 August 2003; 3. "Bottle Living" / "Hold On" Released: 27 October 2003

Paper Monsters is the debut solo studio album by English singer Dave Gahan. It was released on 2 June 2003 in the United Kingdom by Mute Records and the following day in North America by Reprise Records.

== Background and release ==
The album was produced by Ken Thomas, known for his work with Icelandic band Sigur Rós. Upon its debut, critical reception was generally mixed; while many complimented the album's personal subject matter, others described it as lacking depth. Paper Monsters debuted at number 36 on the UK Albums Chart, while reaching the top 10 in Germany, Sweden and Switzerland. In North America, the album was released on 3 June 2003. In March 2004, Gahan released the live video album Live Monsters, containing footage from his concert on 5 July 2003 at the Olympia in Paris.

Gahan first played with the idea of releasing a solo album after the release of Depeche Mode's Exciter in 2001, but approached the project slowly. It was not until he began writing music with friend and musician Knox Chandler that he gained the self-confidence he needed to begin to consider working on an album of his own material.

=== Singles ===
The album spawned three singles. "Dirty Sticky Floors", the lead single from the album, became Gahan's most successful solo release, reaching number 18 on the UK Singles Chart and the top 10 in Germany and Italy. Its remixes were also promoted in US dance clubs, and peaked within the top five of the Billboard Hot Dance Music/Club Play chart.

The second single, "I Need You", was a ballad based around a synth and drum arrangement, which reached number 27 in the UK and number five on the US dance chart.

The third and final single was "Bottle Living" / "Hold On", a double A-side, meaning that two songs were released on the same single. The single continued the album's string of top-40 singles, reaching number 36 in the UK.

== Critical reception ==
Professional ratings
Aggregate scores
Source	Rating
Metacritic	67/100
Review scores
Source	Rating
AllMusic	3/5 stars
BBC Music	Positive
Blender	3/5 stars
Counterculture	4/5 stars
Entertainment.ie	4/5 stars
The Guardian	3/5 stars
Laut.de	3/5 stars
Pitchfork	6.9/10
Slant Magazine	3.5/5 stars
Uncut	3/5 stars

Paper Monsters received generally positive reviews from music critics. At Metacritic, which assigns a normalised rating out of 100 to reviews from mainstream publications, the album received an average score of 79, based on nine reviews.

In a review for BBC Music, Kate Lawrence called Paper Monsters "an assured debut" with "surprising depth". She was impressed by Gahan's vocals on the track "Hidden Houses", which she called "deliciously devilish and angelic in equal measure" and said that it "demonstrates a vocal range rarely seen in the Mode back catalogue". Slant Magazine echoed Lawrence's review for BBC Music, calling the album a "competent solo debut" with "murky rock grooves and throaty vocals".

However, Pitchfork reviewer Michael Idov was less impressed with the album and wrote that its personal subject matter made for a "faintly embarrassing listen". Idov criticised Gahan's lyrics stating that his "vocal can still elevate the dumbest lyric to the level of a cathartic mantra, a skill that comes handy in the absence of Martin Gore". AllMusic reviewer Don Kline called Paper Monsters "a mix of swampy blues-injected rock, slick urban electronica, and atmospheric balladry" and gave it three out of five stars. He also stated that "although it doesn't stray too far from the Depeche Mode, Gahan does manage to put his own stamp on the songs".

== Track listing ==
All tracks are written by Dave Gahan and Knox Chandler.

No.	Title	Length
1.	"Dirty Sticky Floors"	3:32
2.	"Hold On"	4:17
3.	"A Little Piece"	5:10
4.	"Bottle Living"	3:31
5.	"Black and Blue Again"	5:41
6.	"Stay"	4:17
7.	"I Need You"	4:45
8.	"Bitter Apple"	5:59
9.	"Hidden Houses"	5:01
10.	"Goodbye"	5:54
Total length:		48:07

=== Limited edition bonus DVD ===
1. A Short Film
2. "Dirty Sticky Floors" music video
3. Exclusive B-roll footage from the "Dirty Sticky Floors" video shoot
4. "Hold On" (exclusive New York acoustic performance)
5. "A Little Piece" (exclusive New York acoustic performance)
6. Exclusive B-roll footage from the New York acoustic performance
7. Photo gallery

== Personnel ==
Credits adapted from the liner notes of Paper Monsters.

=== Musicians ===
- Dave Gahan – vocals, keyboards, Fender Rhodes, harmonica, glockenspiel
- Knox Chandler – guitars, dulcimer, cellos, basses, keyboards, sampler, vibraphone, programming, all string arrangements
- Victor Indrizzo – drums (tracks 3, 5, 9)
- Paul Garisto – drums (tracks 4, 9, 10)
- Doug Petty – piano (tracks 3, 6)
- Dee Lewis – backing vocals (track 1)
- Jane Scarpantoni – cello
- Antoine Silverman, Maxim Moston, Joan Wasser – violins (tracks 3, 5)
- David Gold – viola (tracks 3, 5)
- Jolyon Thomas – tambourine, tom (track 6)
- John Collyer – programming

=== Technical ===
- Ken Thomas – production, mixing
- Jonathan Adler – recording engineering
- Jack Clark – mix engineering
- Mike Marsh – mastering

=== Artwork ===
- Anton Corbijn – photography, art direction
- Four5One Creative – design

== Charts ==
=== Weekly charts ===
Weekly chart performance for Paper Monsters
Chart (2003)	Peak position
Austrian Albums (Ö3 Austria)	43
Belgian Albums (Ultratop Flanders)	31
Belgian Albums (Ultratop Wallonia)	9
Czech Albums (ČNS IFPI)	2
Danish Albums (Hitlisten)	11
European Albums (Music & Media)	10
Finnish Albums (Suomen virallinen lista)	26
French Albums (SNEP)	21
German Albums (Offizielle Top 100)	5
Greek International Albums (IFPI)	15
Hungarian Albums (MAHASZ)	9
Italian Albums (FIMI)	10
Polish Albums (ZPAV)	23
Scottish Albums (Official Charts)	45
Spanish Albums (AFYVE)	61
Swedish Albums (Sverigetopplistan)	5
Swiss Albums (Schweizer Hitparade)	10
UK Albums (Official Charts)	36
US Billboard 200	127

=== Year-end charts ===
Year-end chart performance for Paper Monsters
Chart (2003)	Position
German Albums (Offizielle Top 100)	73

== Certifications and sales ==
Certifications and sales for Paper Monsters
Region	Certification	Certified units/sales
Germany	—	100,000
Russia (NFPF)	Gold	10,000^{*}
United States	—	39,000
Summaries
Worldwide	—	350,000
^{*} Sales figures based on certification alone.

== Release history ==
Release history for Paper Monsters
Region	Date	Edition	Label	Catalogue
United Kingdom	2 June 2003	Standard	Mute	CDSTUMM216
United Kingdom	2 June 2003	Limited (CD+DVD)	Mute	LCDSTUMM 216
North America	3 June 2003	Standard	Reprise	48471
North America	3 June 2003	Limited (CD+DVD)	Reprise	48492
