= Copyright (band) =

Canadian alternative rock band

- Origin: Canada
- Genre: Alternative rock
- Years active: 1987–2001
- Label: BMG Music
- Past members: Thomas Anselmi; Christian Thorvaldson; Eric Marxsen; Pete Bourne

Copyright, originally spelled ©, was a Canadian alternative rock band, active in the 1990s and early 2000s.

== History ==
The band was launched by vocalist Thomas Anselmi and guitarist Christian Thorvaldson, former members of the short-lived and controversial band Slow, with new bassist Eric Marxsen and drummer Pete Bourne. The band was formed in 1987, when Anselmi and Thorvaldson settled on that name after having collaborated under the short-lived band names Mo and Christian Thorvaldson's Freeze-Dried Dog since the demise of Slow.

Initially, the band spelled its name as the symbol ©, pronounced as "Circle C". Under that name, they released a self-titled debut album via Geffen Records in 1991. That album sold poorly, and the band was dropped from Geffen.

After a few years of struggling to continue in the music industry, they were signed to BMG Music, releasing their second album Love Story in 1996 under the name Copyright. The singles "Transfiguration" and "Radio" were released from that album. Love Story was a shortlisted Juno Award nominee for Best Alternative Album at the Juno Awards of 1998.

The album The Hidden World followed in 2001, with the song "Rock Machine" being released as a single. The band disbanded not long after.
