= Dave Gahan =

English singer (born 1962)

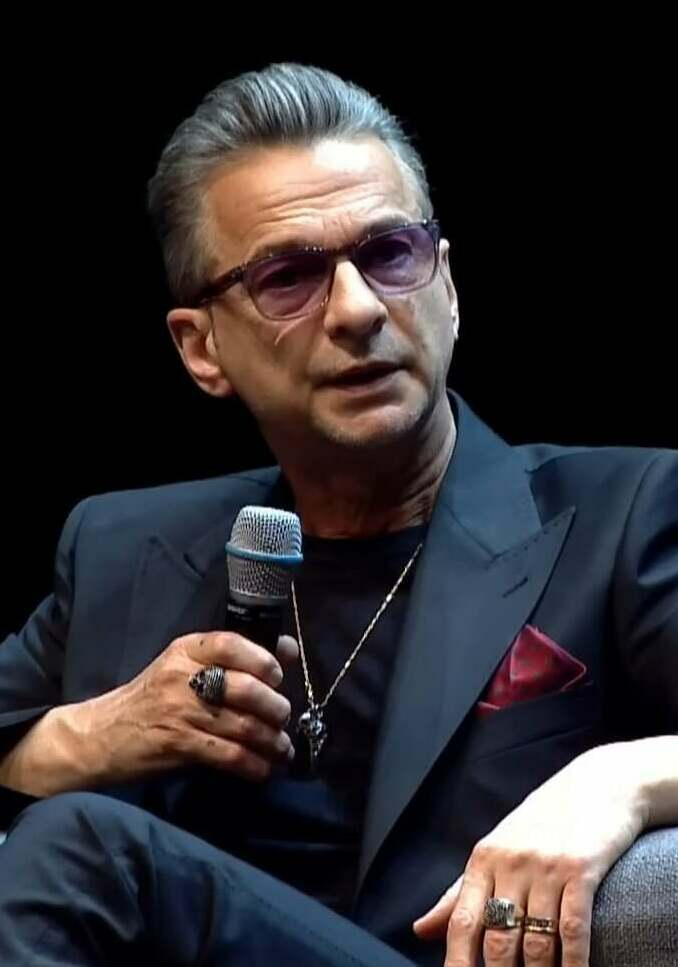
- Dave Gahan with Depeche Mode in 2022

Background information
- Born: David Callcott; 9 May 1962 (age 64); Epping, Essex, England
- Genres: Synth-pop; electronic; new wave; alternative rock; alternative dance
- Occupation: Singer
- Works: Solo; Depeche Mode
- Years active: 1980–present
- Member of: Depeche Mode
- Website: davegahan.com

David Gahan (/ɡɑːn/ GAHN; né Callcott; born 9 May 1962) is an English singer best known as the co-founder and lead singer of electronic music band Depeche Mode since their formation in 1980. Noted for his commanding stage presence and unique baritone voice, Gahan was ranked at No. 73 on Q magazine's list of the "100 Greatest Singers" and No. 27 on its list of the "100 Greatest Frontmen". As a member of Depeche Mode, he was inducted into the Rock and Roll Hall of Fame in 2020.

Gahan's solo albums include Paper Monsters (2003) and Hourglass (2007). He also contributed lyrics and sang lead vocals on the Soulsavers albums The Light the Dead See (2012), Angels & Ghosts (2015) and Imposter (2021).

== Early life ==
Gahan was born David Callcott on 9 May 1962 in Epping, Essex, the son of working-class parents. His mother, Sylvia, was a conductor on London buses, while his father, Len Callcott, was a bus driver of Malaysian descent. When he was six months old, his father left the family; his parents divorced two years later. His mother moved him and his older sister Sue (born 1960) to Basildon, Essex, after marrying her second husband, Shell Oil administrator Jack Gahan; Jack adopted Susan and David. Gahan has two younger half-brothers named Peter (born 1966) and Phil (born 1967). While growing up, he and his sister were under the impression that their adoptive father was their biological father.

When Gahan was nine years old, Jack Gahan died. Later, Gahan met his biological father, Len Callcott. In a 1987 interview, Gahan recalled this experience: "I'll never forget that day. When I came home from school, there was this stranger in my mum's house. My mother introduced him to me as my real dad. I remember I said that was impossible because my father was dead. How was I supposed to know who that man was? From that day on, Len often visited the house, until one year later he disappeared again, forever this time."

While attending Barstable School in Basildon, Gahan started skipping school, getting into trouble with the police, and was suspended from school before ending up in juvenile court three times for offences ranging from joyriding and graffiti to criminal damage and theft. He enjoyed the thrill of stealing cars, driving them, and then setting them on fire. He said of this time in his life, "I was pretty wild. I loved the excitement of nicking a motor, screeching off and being chased by the police. Hiding behind the wall with your heart beating gives you a real kick – 'will they get you?'"

During his final year of school, Gahan applied for a job as an apprentice fitter with North Thames Gas. His probation officer told him to be honest during the interview, leading him to tell the interviewer that he had a criminal record but claim he was a "reformed character," which resulted in him being refused the job. He then trashed his probation officer's office in retaliation, for which he was ordered to spend every Saturday for several weeks at an attendance centre in Romford for one year. He recalled, "You had to work. I remember doing boxing, stuff like that. You had to have your hair cut. It was every weekend, so you were deprived of your weekend and it seemed like forever. I was told very clearly that my next thing was detention centre. To be honest, music saved me."

== Career ==
=== Depeche Mode (1980–present) ===
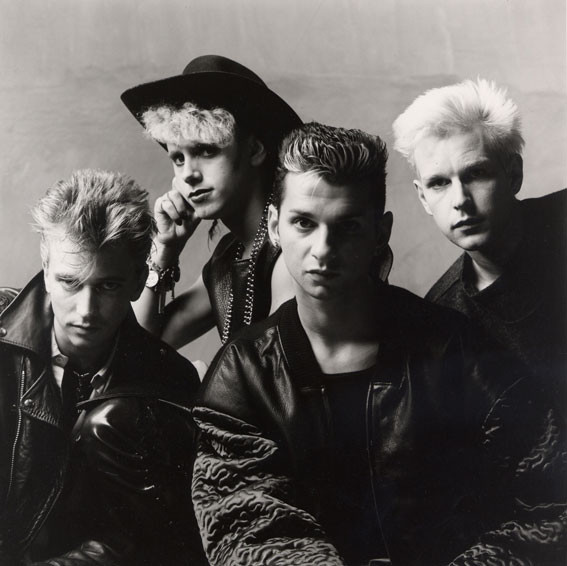
Gahan (centre-right) as member of Depeche Mode, 1985

In March 1980, Martin Gore, Andy Fletcher, and Vince Clarke formed the band Composition of Sound, with Clarke on vocals and guitar, Gore on keyboards and Fletcher on bass. Clarke and Fletcher soon switched to synthesizers. The same year, Gahan joined the band after Clarke heard him perform David Bowie's "'Heroes'". The band was soon renamed Depeche Mode, a name suggested by Gahan after he had come across a fashion magazine called Dépêche-mode. A new wave/synth-pop pioneer of the early 1980s, Depeche Mode have released 15 studio albums, four greatest hits compilations and two remix albums. The band has achieved global sales in excess of 100 million records. Four of the band's singles have reached number one on Billboard's Alternative Songs chart: "Enjoy the Silence" (1990), "Policy of Truth" (1990), "I Feel You" (1993), and "Walking in My Shoes" (1993).

In a 2003 interview, Gahan shared that "During the making of Exciter, sometimes I felt a bit frustrated that there was a lack of experimentation." This led him, in 2004, to tell his bandmates that he wanted to write half of the songs on their next album, and there was "no way" he could be involved in the band without contributing as a songwriter. Eventually, there was a compromise, and three of Gahan's songs appeared on 2005's Playing the Angel: "Suffer Well" (nominated for a Grammy award), "I Want It All" and "Nothing's Impossible". "Suffer Well" was released as a single in 2006, reaching No. 12 in the UK. Gahan also wrote the lyrics to the B-side "Oh Well", although the music was written by Martin Gore. It was their first writing collaboration.

Gahan's persona onstage is influenced by Dave Vanian, frontman of the Damned. He has also credited Bowie, James Brown, Elvis Presley and Prince as influences.

=== Solo albums and collaborations (2003–present) ===
In 2003, Gahan released his first solo album, Paper Monsters (which he co-wrote with guitarist and friend Knox Chandler), followed by the Paper Monsters Tour (including a performance at 2003's Glastonbury Festival), singing both his new solo tracks and Depeche Mode fan favourites. The album was a moderate success. The first single "Dirty Sticky Floors" hit the Top 20 in the UK singles chart. The album became a Top 10 hit on the European album chart and a Top 40 hit in the UK Albums Chart.

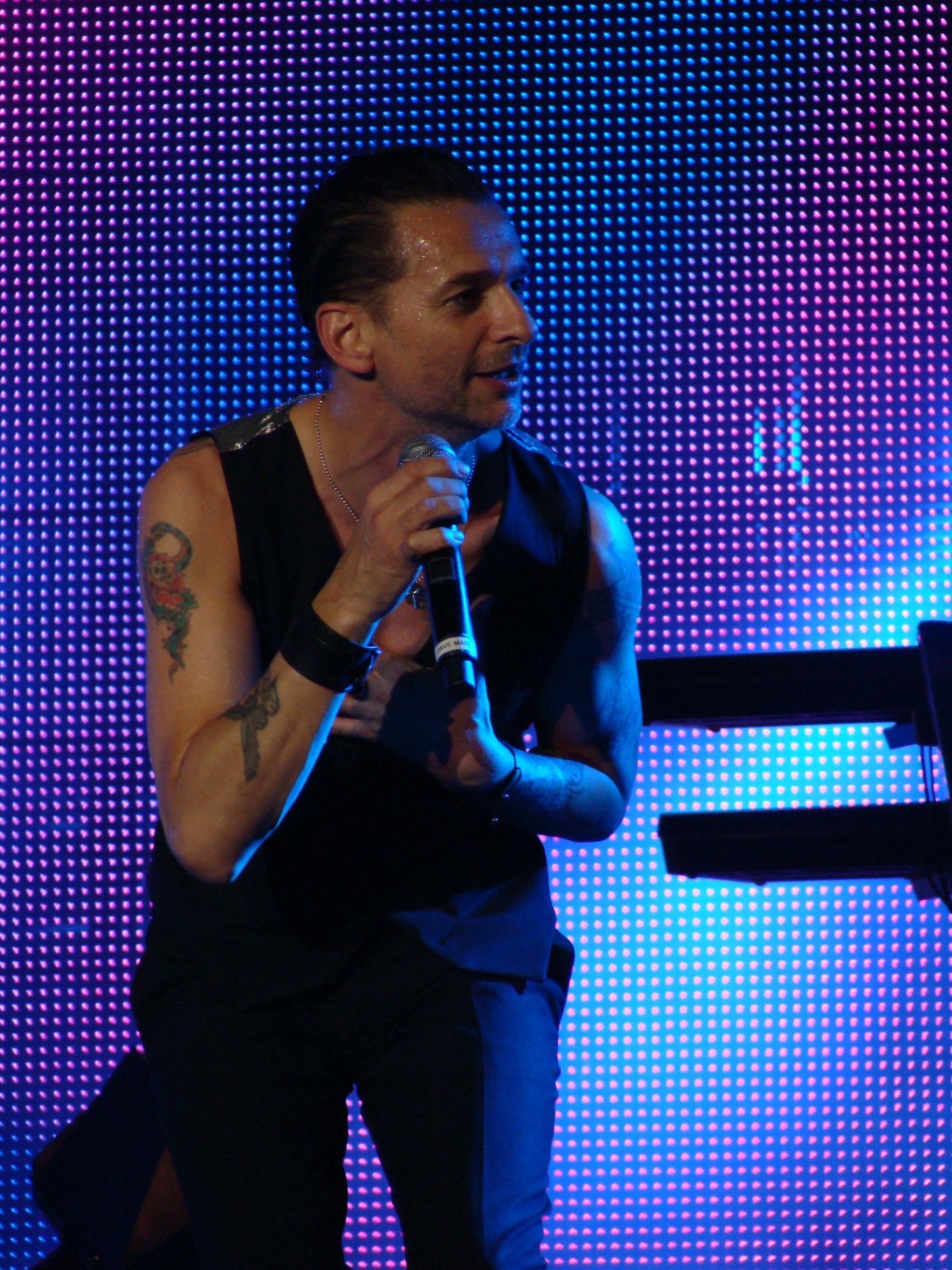
Gahan with Depeche Mode in 2009

In 2007, Gahan announced he was working on a new album via a video greeting for Depeche Mode's official website recorded at the 2007 MusiCares Charity event on 11 May. The album, entitled Hourglass, was accompanied working by Andrew Phillpott and Christian Eigner. The material was recorded at Gahan's 11th Floor Studios in New York City. According to Gahan, Hourglass is more electronic-sounding than Paper Monsters. The album made the UK Top 50, the French Top 20 and narrowly missed going to No. 1 in Germany. The first single to be pulled from Hourglass was "Kingdom".

In July 2007, Side-Line magazine revealed that Gahan had been working with Thomas Anselmi on a project called Mirror, which was produced by Vincent Jones. Along with Jones, who played with Gahan's touring band and mixed the live DVD Live Monsters, Mirror featured another Gahan collaborator, Knox Chandler (Siouxsie & the Banshees, the Psychedelic Furs), as well as piano by Bowie favourite Mike Garson, and a monologue by Warhol superstar Joe Dallesandro. Gahan sang vocals on the track "Nostalgia". The song was released in October 2008, and the album released via download at the start of 2009. He also appeared in the accompanying video for the song.

Gahan also contributed vocals to a track called "Visitors", after walking in while producer and ex-Clor guitarist Luke Smith was working on the song in his New York studio. The song was released under the artist name of frYars.

Gahan is the lead singer and lyricist on Soulsavers' fourth studio album The Light the Dead See. The album was released on 21 May 2012.

Gahan sings and plays harmonica on "Low Guns", the first single from the 2014 album The Morning After by English band SixToes. The single was released on 18 November 2013. The SixToes remix of "Jezebel" was released on the special edition of Sounds of the Universe in 2009. Members of SixToes also collaborated with Soulsavers, on the album The Light the Dead See.

In 2015, Gahan collaborated again with Soulsavers as the main singer on the album Angels & Ghosts. The lead single from the album titled "All of This and Nothing" was released digitally 11 September 2015.

In 2017, Gahan featured on Null + Void's song "Where I Wait" from the album Cryosleep where the song features three times in different remixes.

In 2018, a remix of the Goldfrapp single "Ocean" featuring guest vocals from Gahan was released as a digital download on 21 May 2018. Regarding the collaboration, the Goldfrapp issued a statement: "Working with Dave Gahan on the new version of 'Ocean' had been a real honor for us as a band."

In 2021, Gahan contributed a cover of the Metallica song "Nothing Else Matters" to the charity tribute album The Metallica Blacklist and did guest vocals on a single from Jenny Lee Lindberg. On November 12, 2021, Gahan released an album of covers called Imposter with Soulsavers.

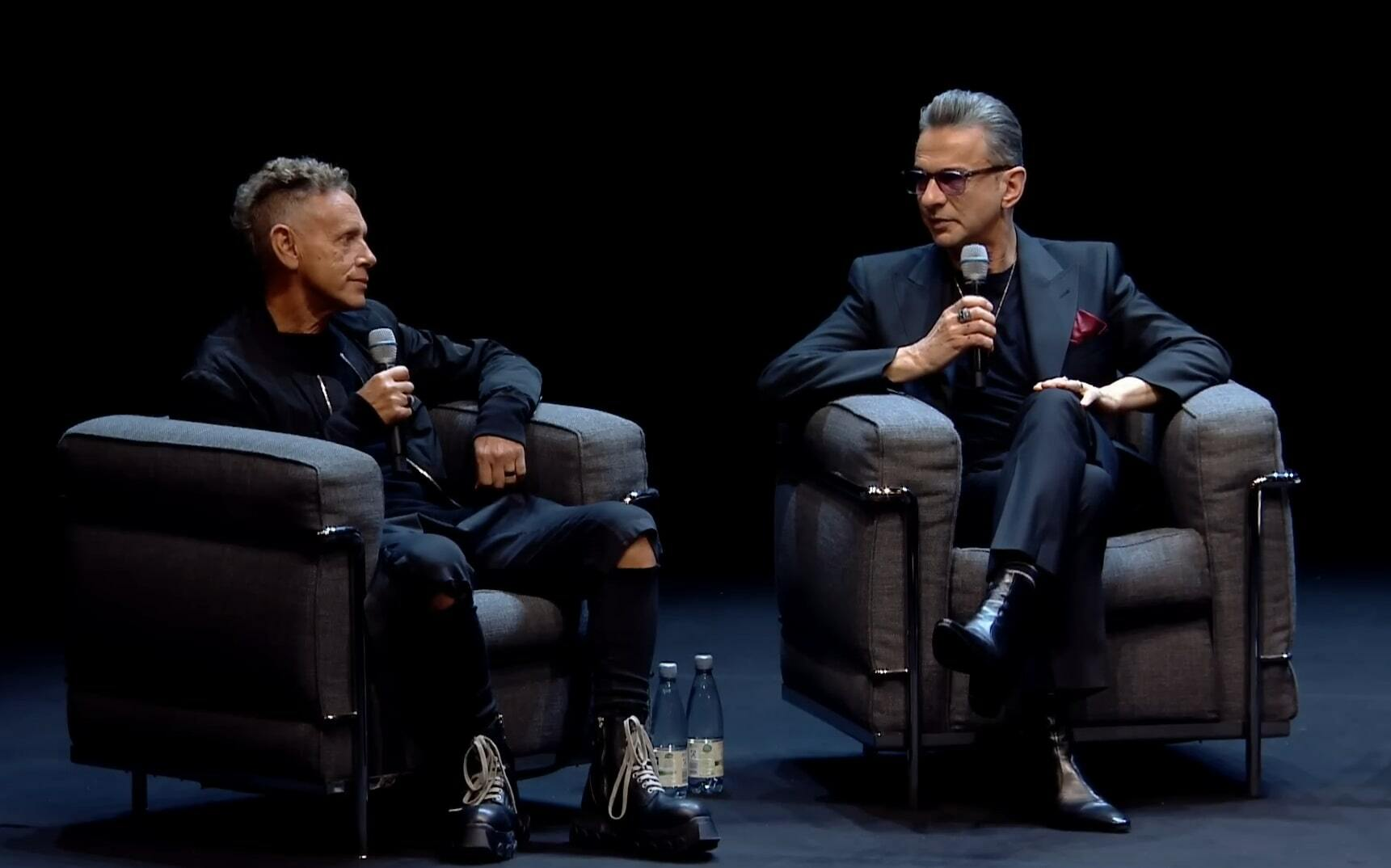
Gahan (right) with bandmate Martin Gore (left) at a press conference for their album Memento Mori in 2022

In 2023, Gahan contributed a cover of "Mother of Earth" by the Gun Club to the fourth installment in the Jeffrey Lee Pierce Sessions Project series of tribute albums, titled The Task Has Overwhelmed Us.

== Personal life ==
Gahan is married to his third wife, Greek-American actress and filmmaker Jennifer Sklias. Gahan and Sklias have a daughter, Stella Rose (born in 1999), who is also a singer. Gahan also adopted Sklias's son from a previous relationship. Gahan has a son named Jack from his first marriage to Joanne Fox. His second marriage, to former Depeche Mode publicist Teresa Conroy, lasted for four years.

Gahan converted to the Greek Orthodox Church before marrying Sklias. In a 2008 interview, he said, "When it comes to religion, it's very confusing and always has been for thousands of years and probably will be for thousands of years more. I don't know what it is I believe in, but I know that I feel a sense of some kind of higher power, for lack of better words."

In a 1997 interview, Gahan referred to himself as "classically ADD".

=== Health issues ===
Gahan is a recovering heroin addict and has had multiple health concerns throughout his career. During his roughest years in Los Angeles, he survived four brushes with death and earned the nickname "The Cat" from local paramedics.

In October 1993, Gahan suffered a minor drug-induced heart attack during a performance in New Orleans, leaving the rest of Depeche Mode to improvise an encore without him.

In August 1995, Gahan attempted suicide by cutting his wrists, later explaining it as a "cry for help" and stating that he had "made sure there were people who might find [him]".

In May 1996, Gahan overdosed on a speedball at the Sunset Marquis Hotel in Los Angeles, which resulted in his heart stopping for two minutes until he was revived by paramedics. He said he had an out-of-body experience: "All I saw and all I felt at first was complete darkness. I've never been in a space that was blacker, and I remember feeling that whatever it was I was doing, it was really wrong. Then the next thing I remember was seeing myself on the floor, on the steps outside my hotel bathroom, and there was a lot of activity going on around me. In some ways it was very liberating. Then I came to and a cop was handcuffing me. It certainly wasn't a place I'd like to visit again." Several months later, after facing drug charges, he checked himself into rehab.

In May 2009, shortly before Depeche Mode were due onstage in Athens during their Tour of the Universe, Gahan became ill in his dressing room. He was rushed to hospital, where it was suspected he was suffering from a bout of gastroenteritis. A scan revealed a malignant tumour in his bladder, which was removed. Several shows were postponed and he underwent cancer treatments during the remaining three months of the tour.

In July 2009, Gahan suffered a torn calf muscle while performing in Bilbao, resulting in two further show cancellations. After a two-week break, he and Depeche Mode returned to the tour for their North American leg. While performing in Seattle the following month, Gahan strained his vocal cords and doctors ordered him to undertake complete vocal rest, resulting in two more cancelled shows.

In May 2011, Gahan was honoured at the seventh annual MusiCares MAP Fund Benefit Concert for more than a decade of sobriety.

== Discography ==
=== Studio albums ===
- Paper Monsters (2003)
- Hourglass (2007)

=== with Soulsavers ===
- The Light the Dead See (2012)
- Angels & Ghosts (2015)
- Imposter (2021)

=== with Depeche Mode ===
- Speak & Spell (1981)
- A Broken Frame (1982)
- Construction Time Again (1983)
- Some Great Reward (1984)
- Black Celebration (1986)
- Music for the Masses (1987)
- Violator (1990)
- Songs of Faith and Devotion (1993)
- Ultra (1997)
- Exciter (2001)
- Playing the Angel (2005)
- Sounds of the Universe (2009)
- Delta Machine (2013)
- Spirit (2017)
- Memento Mori (2023)
