= Knox Chandler =

American musician

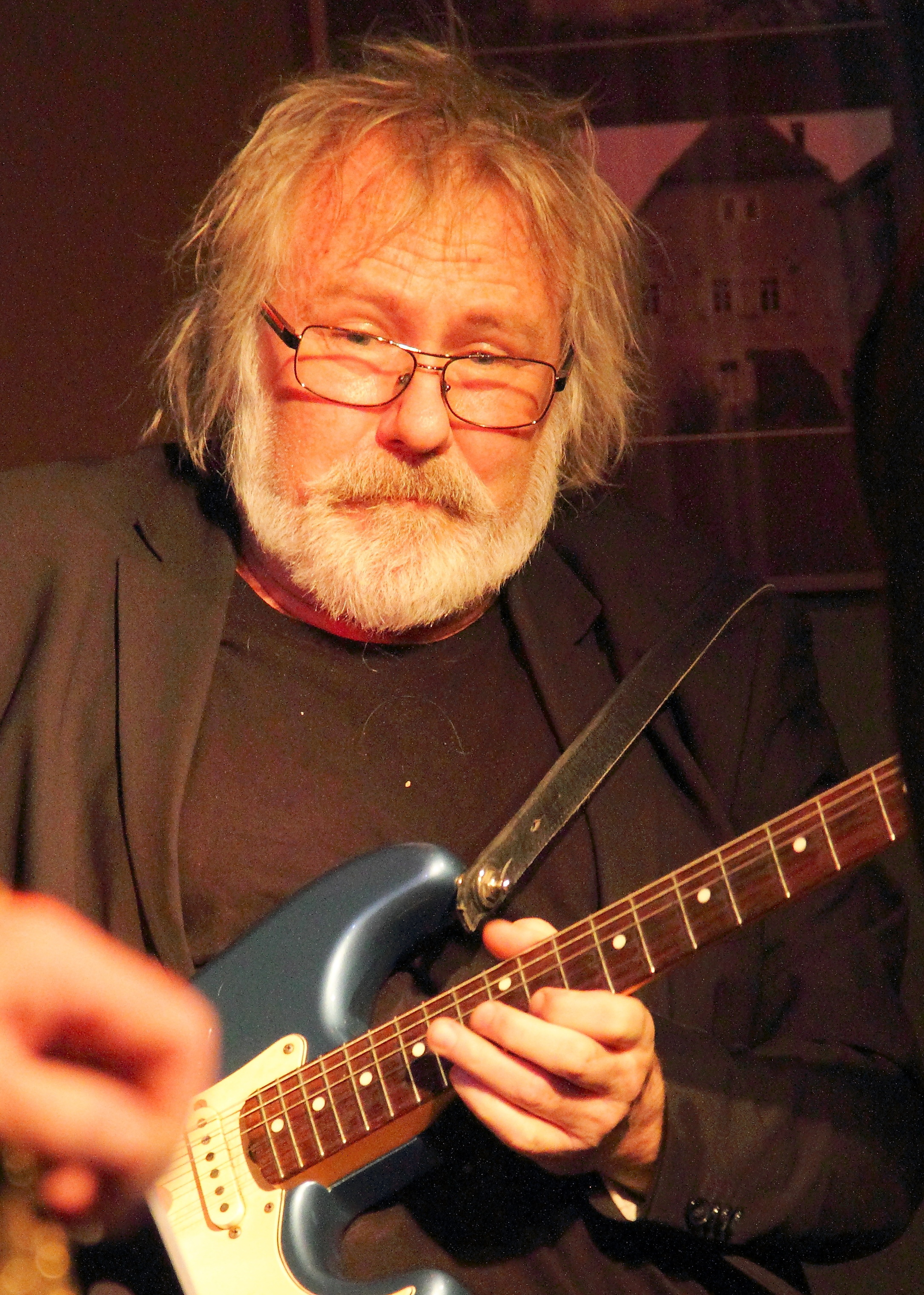
- Chandler in 2018

Background information
- Born: July 20, 1958 (age 67); Louisville, Kentucky, U.S.
- Occupation: Musician
- Instruments: Guitar; cello; bass

Knox Chandler (born July 20, 1958) is an American musician. He is primarily a guitarist, but he also plays cello, bass, and other instruments. He has also worked as a session musician.

== Education ==
Chandler attended the Hammonasset School in Madison, CT and graduated from Bard College, in Annandale-On-Hudson, NY. He obtained a post-graduate certificate from the University of Sussex England from the British Irish Modern Music Institute (BIMM).

== Career ==
Chandler's career was launched in New York City's post punk and new wave era of the early 1980s. Aside from his career as an instrumentalist, he writes string arrangements and compositional collaborations.

Artists and bands Chandler has worked include Depeche Mode on their album Exciter providing string arrangements, Lori Carson, The Golden Palominos, the Psychedelic Furs, Ultra Vivid Scene, the Creatures, R.E.M., Siouxsie and the Banshees, and Cyndi Lauper.

=== Collaborations ===
Chandler collaborated with Dave Gahan, of Depeche Mode, on his solo album Paper Monsters, and played guitar during Gahan's 2003 Paper Monsters Tour in support of the album.

He has also toured and collaborated with Eric Mingus, Bobby Previte; Chris Palmaro; Mars Williams; Maggie Estep; and works with Mingus, Previte and Williams.

== Personal life ==
In 2012, Chandler moved to Berlin and continued to tour with various musicians as well as becoming head of the guitar department at the British Irish Modern Music Institute (BIMM).

== Discography ==
Artist	Record	Label	Year	Role
Gary Windo	Deepwater	Antilles/Island	1988	Producer, Composer, Guitar
The Psychedelic Furs	Book of Days	Columbia	1989	Guitar
The Psychedelic Furs	World Outside	Columbia	1991	Guitar, Cello
The Ancients	The Ancients	Mission Recording Company	1991	Cello
R.E.M	Automatic for the People	Warner	1992	Cello
Darden Smith	Little Victories	Chaos	1993	Guitar
Paula Cole	Harbinger	Imago	1994	Cello
Various	Dangerous Inventions	Futurist	1994	Guitar, Composer
Lee Aaron	Emotional Rain	A&M	1994	Guitar
David Wilcox	Big Horizon	A&M	1994	Guitar
Love Spit Love	Love Spit Love	Imago	1994	Composer
Blind Light	Absence of Time	Alida	1994	Guitar
Maggie Estep	No More Mister Nice Girl	Imago	1994	Cello
Monday Michiru	Groovement	Kitty Records	1994	Guitar
The Golden Palominos	Pure	Restless Records	1994	Guitar
Siouxsie and the Banshees	Showgirls (film)	Interscope	1994	Guitar
Gawk	Gawd	Invisible	1995	Guitar
Aceilux	Forbidden Fruit	Videoarts Music Inc.	1995	Guitar
Hal Hartley	Amateur Soundtrack	Matador	1995	Cello
Lori Carson	Where It Goes	Restless Records	1995	Guitar/Cello
Susan Werner	Last of the Good Straight Girls	Private Music	1995	Guitar/Cello
Stina Nordenstam & Anton Fier	The Photographers Wife(film)	East West	1996	Guitar
The Golden Palominos	Dead Inside	Restless Records	1996	Composer/Guitar
Parlor James	Dreadful Sorry	Discovery Records	1996	Guitar
Various: Divination	Distill	Sub Meta	1996	Guitar
Lori Carson	Everything I Touch Runs Wild =	Restless Records	1997	Guitar
Edgar Allan Poe	Closed on the Account of Rabies	Mercury	1997	Guitar
Maggie Estep	Love is Dog From Hell	Mouth Almighty Records	1997	Guitar, Bass, Cello, Producer, Composer
The Psychedelic Furs	The Radio One Sessions	Strange Fruit	1997	Guitar
Rule 62	Rule 62	Maverick	1997	Cello
Various Spaces: A Journey into Ambient Worlds	Blind Light	Rountrip Records	1997	Guitar
Willy Porter	Falling Forward	Six Degrees Records	1999	Cello, Guitar, Loops
Bree Sharp	A Cheap and Evil Girl	Trauma Records	1999	Bass
The Creatures	Anima Animus	Instinct Records	1999	Guitar, Bass, Mouth Harp
Natalie Merchant	Lilith Fair, Volume 2	Arista Recorda	1999	Guitar
Miu Sakamoto	Dawn Pink	WEA	1999	Guitar
Dar Williams	The Green World	Razor and Tie	2000	Cello
Darden Smith	Extra Dry	Valley Entertainment Inc.	2000	Guitar
Puracane	Things You Should Leave Alone	Ubiquity	2000	Guitar
Anika Moa	Thinking Room	Atlantic	2001	Bass, Mandolin
Professional Murder Music	Professional Murder Music	Geffen	2001	Cello
Amanda Thorpe	Mass	Cropduster	2001	Guitar
Depeche Mode	Exciter	Reprise/Mute	2001	Cello, String Arrangement
Siouxsie and the Banshees	The Seven Year Itch	Sanctuary	2003	Guitar
Okuda Tamir	E	SME Records.	2002	Guitar
Darden Smith	Sunflower	Dualtone	2002	Guitar, Cello
Cyndi Lauper	Shine	Oglio Records	2002	Guitar, Cello, String Arrangement
Jesse Malin	The Fine Art of Self Destruction	Artemis Records	2003	Cello
Anton Fier	Dreamspeed/Blind Light 1992–1994	Tzadik	2003	Guitar
Lori Carson	Stolen Beauty	Restless Records	2003	Guitar, Bass, Composer
Dave Gahan	Paper Monsters	Reprise/Mut	2003	Guitar, Bass, Cello, Dulcimer, Keyboards, Composer, Programming
Slang	More Talk About Tonight	Terminus Records	2004	Composer, Guitar
Siouxsie Sioux	Dreamshow	Rhino Records	2005	Guitar, Bass, Cello
Sarah Blasko	What the Sea Wants, the Sea Will Have	Low Altitude Records	2007	Guitar
Dave Gahan	Live Monsters	Mute	2007	Guitar
Emma Pollack	Watch The Fireworks	4AD	2007	Guitar
Joy Askew	The Pirate of Eel Pie	Red Parlor records	2008	Guitar
Cyndi Lauper	Bring Ya to the Brink	Epic	2008	Guitar
London/Sklamberg	Tsuker-zis	Tzadik	2009	Guitar
Barbara Sukowa and the XPatsys	Devouring Time	Winter & Winter	2010	Guitar
Alan Abrahams	Portable	!K7 records	2016	Guitar, Bass
Porter Nickerson	Bonfire To Ash	Weasel Records	2016	Guitar
Rita Redshoes	Her	Universal	2016	String Arrangements, Guitar
Tau	Tau Tau Tau	Drones of Praise	2016	Guitar
Various	I Never Metaguitar Four	Clean Feed	2017	Composer, Guitar
Robot	Vedgdbol	Impression Recordings	2017	Guitar
Lissie	Castles	Lionboy Records	2018	Guitar
Jesper Munk	Favorite Stranger	Warner	2018	Guitar
Them There	Love is An Elevator	Sony	2018	Guitar, String Arrangements
Herbert Gronemeyer	Tumult	Grönland Records	2018	Guitar
Tau and the Drones of Praise		Drones of Praise	2019	Guitar
Mars Williams Albert Tyler	Xmas Live Show in Krakow	Not Two Records	2019	Guitar
Robot	Wedding Address	Impression Recordings	2020	Guitar
Peaches	AngelHeaded Hipster (TRex)	BMG	2020	Guitar
Pure Reason Revolution	Eupnea	Inside Out Music	2020	String Arrangement
Kenichi and the Sun	White Fire	Radical Amazement	2021	Guitar
Peter Freeman	K3CS	Zoar Records	2022	Guitar
