= Introns (album) =

Remix album by LCD Soundsystem
- Released: 13 March 2006
- Genre: Dance-punk
- Length: 65:20
- Label: DFA Records
- Producer: The DFA

LCD Soundsystem chronology
LCD Soundsystem (2005)	Introns (2006)	45:33 (2006)

Introns is a remix album by the American rock band LCD Soundsystem, released in March 2006 through DFA as a digital download. It is a compilation of B-sides and remixes from the band's eponymous debut album and associated singles. The cover image shows James Murphy's record collection.

Three of the tracks are from a session recorded for London radio station XFM. The session version of "Slowdive", a Siouxsie and the Banshees cover, was originally on the "Disco Infiltrator" single.

== Track listing ==
All tracks are written by James Murphy, except for track 5, written by Siouxsie and the Banshees.

No.	Title	Writer(s)	Length
1.	"Yr City's a Sucker"		5:30
2.	"Daft Punk Is Playing at My House" (Soulwax Shibuya Mix)		6:34
3.	"Disco Infiltrator" (FK's Infiltrated Vocal)		7:47
4.	"Disco Infiltrator" (FK's Infiltrated Dub)		7:20
5.	"Slowdive" (XFM Session)	Susan Ballion; Peter Edward Clarke; John McGeoch; Steven Severin	4:12
6.	"Tribulations" (Tiga's Out of the Trance Closet Mix)		7:05
7.	"Tribulations" (Lindstrøm Mix)		7:54
8.	"On Repeat" (XFM Session)		6:48
9.	"Thrills" (XFM Session)		3:31
10.	"Too Much Love" (Rub 'n' Tug Mix)		8:30
