= Le Tour Eiffel =

EP by Siouxsie
- Released: 10 December 2007
- Recorded: 29 September 2007
- Genre: Alternative rock
- Length: 16:03
- Label: W14

Le Tour Eiffel is a live EP by Siouxsie, released in December 2007 on iTunes and also available on Amazon Digital Music. It is a digital download only release.

The songs were recorded in Paris on the first floor of Eiffel Tower ("La Tour Eiffel" in French) on 29 September 2007, during a private concert in front of 250-crowd of guests and competition winners. The ep contains live versions of three songs from her Mantaray album: "About to Happen", "If It Doesn't Kill You", "Here Comes That Day" plus a cover version of the Doors' "Hello, I Love You". The live versions were later available on vinyl and cd on the b-sides of "About to Happen".

== Track listing ==
1. "About to Happen" (Live In Paris)
2. "If It Doesn't Kill You" (Live In Paris)
3. "Here Comes That Day" (Live In Paris)
4. "Hello, I Love You" (Live In Paris)

== Personnel ==
- Steve Evans – guitar
- Charlie Jones – bass and upright bass
- Robert Brian – drums
- Ted Benham – percussion
- Amanda Kramer – keyboards, synth
- Gabriele Nicotra - sound engineer
