= Finale: The Last Mantaray & More Show =

Video by Siouxsie
- Released: 18 May 2009 (UK)
- Recorded: 29 September 2008
- Genre: Alternative rock
- Label: Fremantle Media Enterprises
- Director: Harvey Bertram-Brown

Siouxsie chronology
Dreamshow (2005)	Finale: The Last Mantaray & More Show (2009)

Finale: The Last Mantaray & More Show is a live DVD by Siouxsie, released in 2009. It is the last show of the Mantaray and More Tour, which took place on 29 September 2008 at London's KOKO in Camden. Siouxsie said: "We were thinking of filming in South America but that got pulled right at the last minute". That's when she decided they had got to have a document of the show, the band and how she was feeling onstage, "because all the concerts had been going so well". "So I decided to put in a one off show at Koko and film it".

The DVD includes music from her bands Siouxsie and the Banshees and the Creatures, and songs from her critically acclaimed Mantaray album.

It also features two cover versions only performed on the tour, the Doors's "Hello, I Love You" and Nancy Sinatra's "These Boots Are Made for Walkin'", plus a rendition of Basement Jaxx's "Cish Cash", which Siouxsie co-composed and sang in 2003.

Siouxsie began the concert telling the audience a Bette Davis line from the film All About Eve: "Fasten up your seatbelts, it's going to be a bumpy night". She hadn't played at Koko since 1977, it was before she was signed; the venue was called the "Music Machine" back then. The intro tape heard at the beginning of the DVD - which had also been used at all the concerts of the tour, was an excerpt of the soundtrack for the movie For a Few Dollars More composed by Ennio Morricone for the scenes with the watch.

== Track listing ==
1. "They Follow You" (from Siouxsie's Mantaray)
2. "About to Happen" (from Siouxsie's Mantaray)
3. "Hong Kong Garden" (from Siouxsie and the Banshees' The Best of)
4. "Dear Prudence" (from Siouxsie and the Banshees' The Best of)
5. "Right Now" (from the Creatures' A Bestiary of)
6. "Sea of Tranquility" (from Siouxsie's Mantaray)
7. "Christine" (from Siouxsie and the Banshees' Kaleidoscope)
8. "Happy House" (from Siouxsie and the Banshees' Kaleidoscope)
9. "One Mile Below" (from Siouxsie's Mantaray)
10. "Into a Swan" (from Siouxsie's Mantaray)
11. "Israel" (from Siouxsie and the Banshees' The Best of)
12. "Arabian Knights" (from Siouxsie and the Banshees' Juju)
13. "Here Comes That Day" (from Siouxsie's Mantaray)
14. "Hello, I Love You"
15. "If It Doesn't Kill You" (from Siouxsie's Mantaray)
16. "Night Shift" (from Siouxsie and the Banshees' Juju)
17. "Loveless" (from Siouxsie's Mantaray)
18. "These Boots Are Made for Walkin'"
19. "Spellbound" (from Siouxsie and the Banshees' Juju)
20. "Nicotine Stain" (from Siouxsie and the Banshees' The Scream)
21. "Cish Cash"
22. "Swansway/Reprise"

== Bonus ==
A 30-minute interview with Siouxsie

== Band members ==
- Steve Evans - guitar
- Robert Brian - drums
- Ted Benham - percussion
- Amanda Kramer - keyboards/synth
- Joe Short - bass

== Crew members ==
- Sue Collier - tour manager
- Neil Iceton - sound engineer
- Gabriele Nicotra - sound engineer
- Daniel Hawkes - stage manager
