= Koko (music venue) =

Music venue and former theatre in London, England

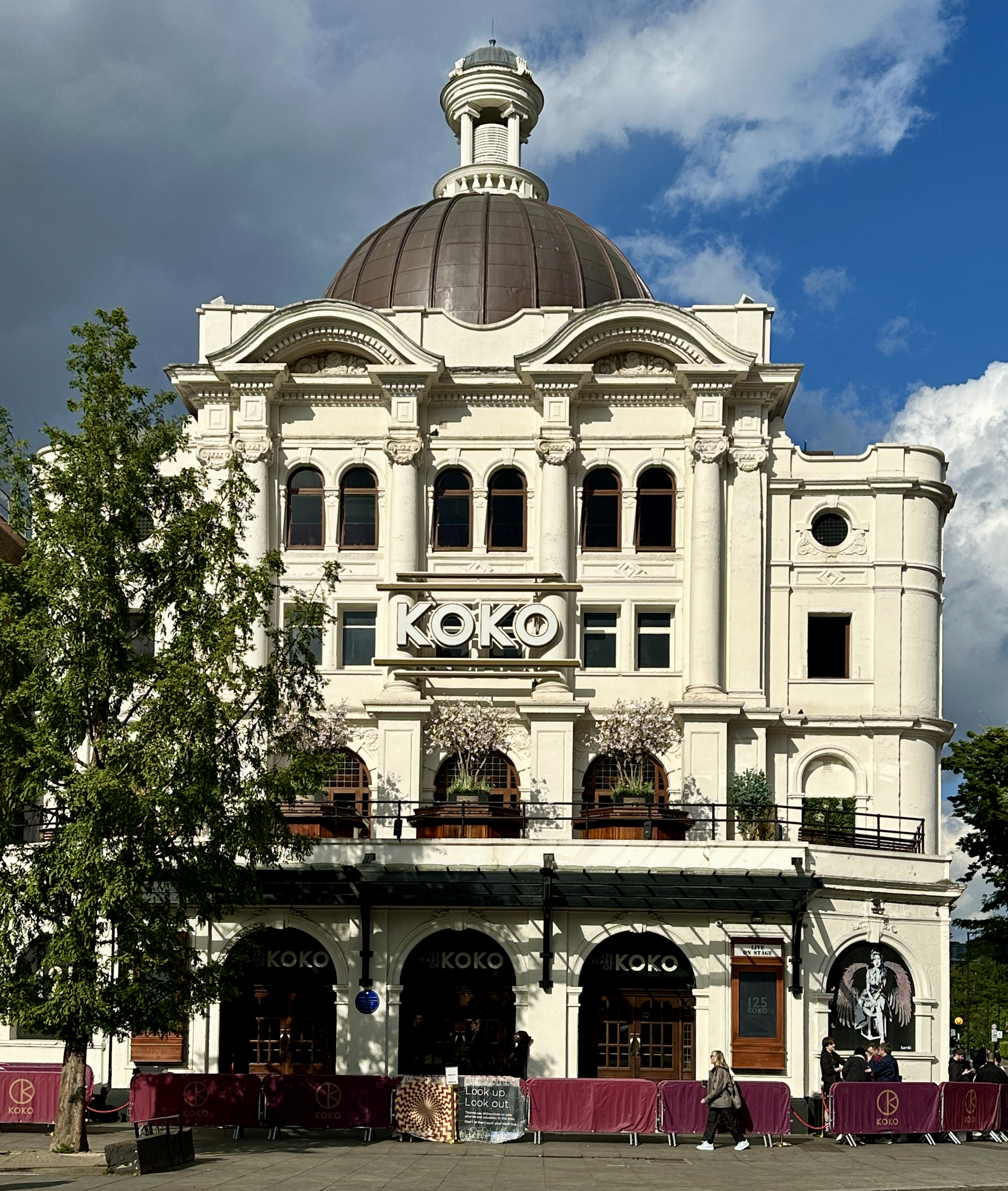
- Exterior pictured in 2026
- Interactive map of Koko
- Former names: Camden Theatre (1900–1909); Camden Hippodrome Theatre (1909–1913); Camden Hippodrome Picture Theatre (1913–1945); BBC Camden Theatre (1945–1977); The Music Machine (1977–1982); Camden Palace (1982–2004)
- Location: Camden Town; London, NW1; England
- Coordinates: 51.534722°N 0.138333°W
- Owner: The Mint Group
- Capacity: 1,500
- Type: Music venue
- Current use: Music venue
- Public transit: Mornington Crescent

Construction
- Renovated: 2004
- Architect: W. G. R. Sprague

Website
- koko.co.uk

Listed Building – Grade II
- Official name: Camden Palace Theatre
- Designated: 28 June 1972
- Reference no.: 1272425

Koko is a concert venue and former theatre in Camden Town, London. Opened in 1900 as a theatre, it was first named the Camden Theatre, before reopening as a variety theatre in 1909 under the name Camden Hippodrome Theatre and then converting to a cinema two years later as Camden Hippodrome Picture Theatre. It was closed during World War II and taken over by the BBC following the war's conclusion. The BBC left in 1972 and the building lay empty until being reopened in 1977 as a live music venue named the Music Machine. The Music Machine was renamed the Camden Palace in 1982. The venue was purchased in 2004 and was the subject of extensive restoration, led by Oliver Bengough and Mint Entertainment. Following the restoration, the venue was renamed as Koko. In this guise it has been described as one of the premier live music venues in London.

== History ==
=== 1900–1945: Theatre and cinema ===
The Camden Theatre opened on Boxing Day 1900. With a capacity of 2,434 it was one of the largest theatres in London outside the West End. The theatre was designed by the theatre architect W. G. R. Sprague. Ellen Terry opened the theatre, then the most celebrated actress in England, who had lived in nearby Stanhope Street as a child.

The St Pancras Gazette, a local newspaper, commented as follows in a review of the theatre's production of an opera called The Geisha in 1901:

It is a matter of special gratification that the opera was presented at our beautiful local theatre on a scale of magnificence and completeness which would do credit to a West End theatre, but this is nothing new at the Camden Theatre, being rather a continuation of the policy with which the proprietors started their enterprise, viz. to offer nothing to their patrons but standard work, which has received the unmistakable approval of critics and public.

On 6 December 1909 it reopened as a variety theatre and became the Camden Hippodrome Theatre. By 1911 films were being presented as part of the variety programme and in January 1913 it became a cinema known as the Camden Hippodrome Picture Theatre. In January 1928, the theatre was bought by the Gaumont British cinema circuit.

=== 1945–1972: BBC studio ===
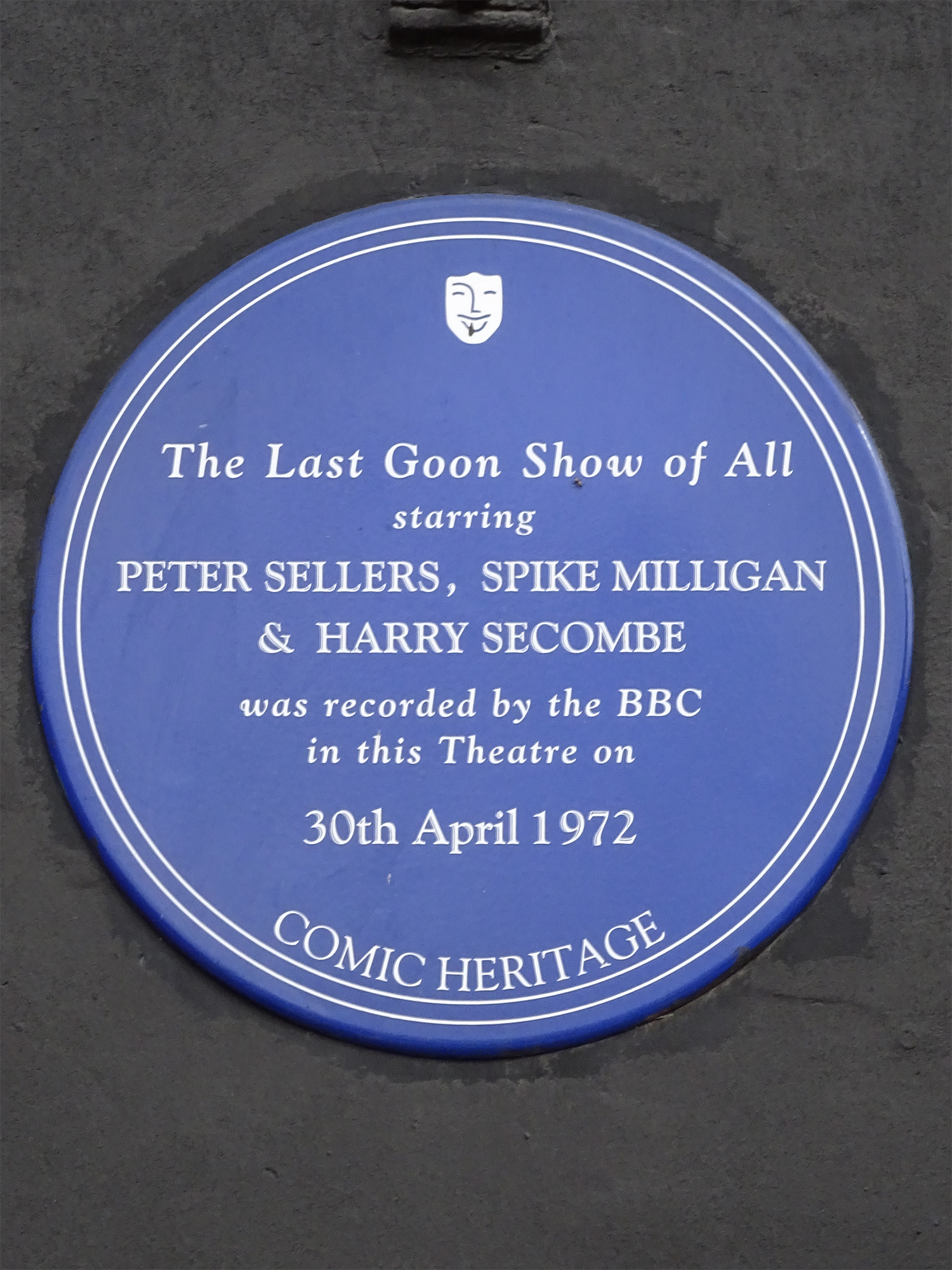
Blue plaque at Koko

Closed during World War II, it outlived many similar buildings, including Camden Town's other theatre, the Bedford Theatre, because the BBC took it over to be used a radio and recording studio in 1945. They continued to use the former theatre until the early 1970s. Among the first weekly series to be broadcast live from here was The Richard Tauber Programme, from 1945 to 1947. Later recorded at the theatre were The Goon Show and the first Monty Python's Flying Circus album (2 May 1970).

After the BBC left in 1972, the building remained empty for a number of years. It was even the subject of demolition proposals until it was Grade II architecturally listed in late 1972.

=== 1977–1982: The Music Machine ===
In 1977 it re-opened as a live music venue named the Music Machine. It was the central location for the 1979 Disco Dance film, The Music Machine. It was particularly popular with new wave and punk bands, hosting concerts by groups including The Boomtown Rats, The Clash, and The Jam. It was the last venue AC/DC's Bon Scott was seen drinking at before his death in 1980.

=== 1982–2004: Camden Palace ===
In 1982 the venue was renamed Camden Palace. During this period, it hosted the weekly rock night "Feet First", each Tuesday. The nights were hosted by Jonathon and Eko of Feet First. Camden Palace was the location of Madonna's first UK performance.

After the early 1980s New Romantic scene, for which both the club and Steve Strange and Rusty Egan became world famous, the Camden Palace featured as a home for early 1980s dance and new wave club music imported from New York City, as well as pioneering early house music night "Delerium," which was run by Robin King in 1987 and featured resident DJs Colin Faver of Kiss FM and Eddie Richards. Famously Prince performed at the Camden Palace in 1988 on his Lovesexy Tour with Ronnie Wood of The Rolling Stones as guest guitarist, he later that evening held an invite only after party in the club and performed a couple of further impromptu numbers that night. Prince appeared and performed further full concerts at the club in later decades. Hüsker Dü played their first show outside of the US at the venue in 1985.

The early 1990s saw "Delerium" leave the Camden Palace club, and as rave music took hold Camden Palace became a mecca for the burgeoning rave music scene from 1989 to 1992. The DJs during this period were DMC DJ John Saunderson and Chris Paul. Early PA performances included both The Prodigy and N-Joi. Appearances from live bands continued, however, including Blur and Cardiacs.

Later in the 1990s, the venue was famous for holding weekly rave events and was illuminated with UV lights, state of the art sound system, and décor of the rave scene. During this time the legendary weekly house/acid house event, "Clockwork Orange" was held on a Saturday with Andy Manston and Danny Gould running until 2001, "Frantic" (hard house/trance) and the iconic house/trance event "Peach" with Graham Gold, Pele, Darren Pearce and Dave Lambert running until the Camden Palace closed in 2004.

=== 2004–2020: Restoration and relaunch ===
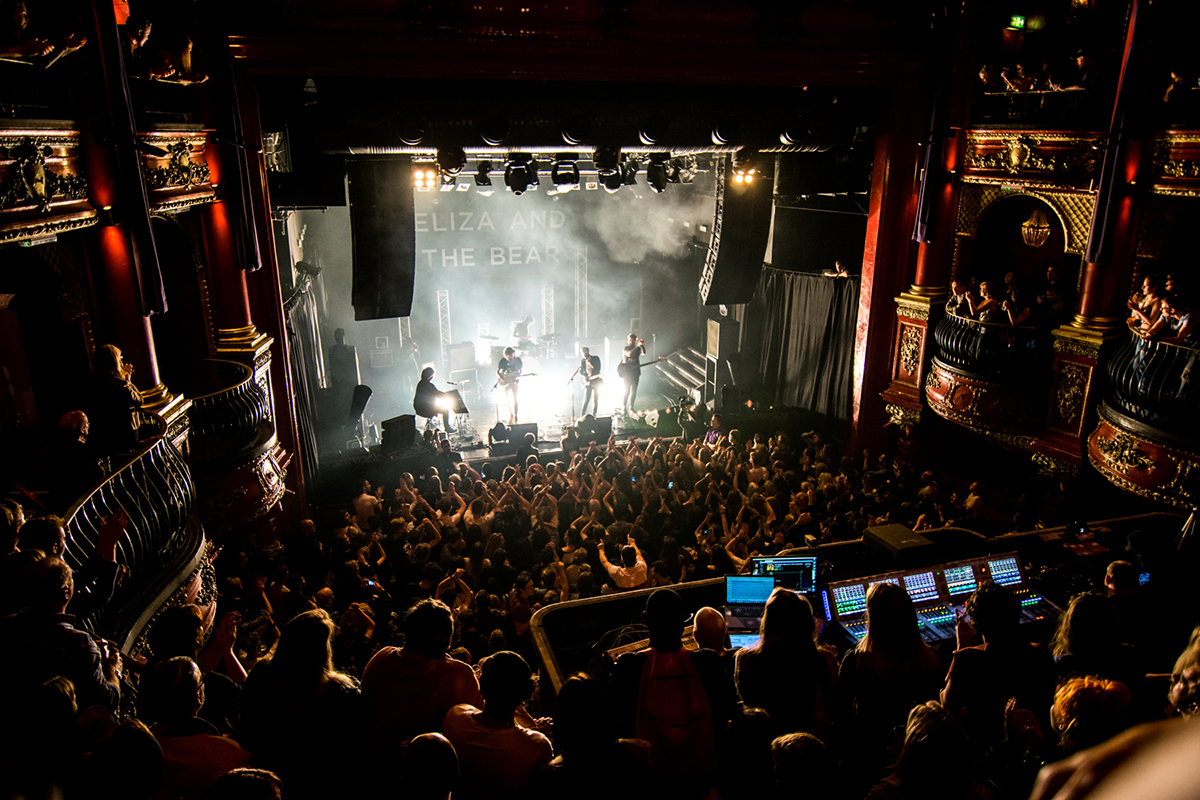
Eliza and the Bear performing in 2015

By 2004, the Camden Palace was run down and in disuse. That year, the theatre was purchased by Oliver Bengough and his company Mint Entertainment. Bengough saw the potential of the theatre and embarked on a multimillion-pound restoration process lasting more than six months. The restoration process included all new technical facilities, enabling the scope of operations to be broadened to include live concert performances, club nights, corporate events, and television production. The Daily Telegraph described the modern interior amenities and the building's historic facade as "lend[ing] a sense of grandeur to any gig".

In the 2010s, some events held at the Camden Palace returned to the venue, including reunions for Peach and Clockwork Orange.

=== 2020–present: Fire and reopening ===
A large fire at the building during renovation work was reported at 8:56 pm on 6 January 2020; eight fire engines and about 60 firefighters tended to it, and the blaze was declared under control at 2:37 am. The cause of the fire is not known as of 7 January 2020, but the damage appears to have been contained to the roof of the building.

Following a multimillion-pound refurbishment, Koko reopened in April 2022. The inaugural concert featured Arcade Fire, marking the release of their sixth studio album We.

== Sustainability programme ==
Since the 2004 restoration, Koko's commitment to sustainability has been recognised with an award for Environmental Excellence in Camden Organisations (EECO), for Innovation in Waste Management and Recycling. The venue has been praised for "the continued exceptional effort by staff to achieve a 95% recycling rate in the difficult events and entertainment industry, and for the use of recycled materials within the building in order to close the recycling loop."

== List of notable performances ==
On 19 March 1964, The Rolling Stones performed at the venue. On 10 March 1970, The Faces performed there. On 30 April 1972, the theatre was the venue for The Goon Show's reunion episode, The Last Goon Show of All; several senior members of the royal family attended this episode, which was filmed and recorded.

On 2 March 1978, The Jam performed, with the concert recorded and released as part of the 2015 box set Fire and Skill – The Jam Live, then subsequently given a limited standalone vinyl release. On 24-26 July 1978, The Clash performed, with the concerts recorded and released as part of the 1978 movie Rude Boy (film). On 10 September 1979, heavy metal band Iron Maiden performed a gig at The Music Machine. The band, at the time, consisted of Steve Harris (bass), Dave Murray (lead guitar), Paul Di'Anno (vocals), Tony Parsons (lead guitar) and Doug Sampson (drums).

On 14 November 1980, The Music Machine hosted an infamous gig by London mod revival band the Chords, where onstage interactions between the band members ranged from frosty to outright hostile and following the gig, the Chords' frontman Billy Hassett left the band acrimoniously and was later replaced by Kip Herring. In 1985, Steve Marriott performed with his band Packet of Three.

The cult London electronic band You You You, consisting of Karen O'Connor, Laurence Malice, and Iain Williams, performed their debut concert at the Camden Palace on January 13, 1987. The band billed their first series of concerts as 'Stage 1' of their 'World Domination Tour' and enlisted the help of illustrator Mark Wardel to design their publicity. Their appearance at the Camden Palace attracted over 1,000 people on what the Met Office recorded as probably being England's coldest night of the 20th Century.

In 2005, a year after restoration, Coldplay chose Koko to launch their album X&Y. Later that year, Madonna also hosted her album launch of Confessions on a Dance Floor at Koko. The next year, in 2006, Elton John hosted a benefit party at Koko for his AIDS Charity Bash, attended by Natalie Imbruglia, Elle Macpherson, Jade Jagger, and Kevin Spacey.

Prince performed a secret show at Koko in 2007. The American band My Chemical Romance also played a private show at Koko in 2007, hosted by BBC Radio 1. Later in 2007, The Disney Channel used Koko to host Hannah Montana's Live in London, an exclusive one-off event broadcast globally for her fans. In 2008, Siouxsie Sioux recorded a live DVD at Koko called Finale: The Last Mantaray & More Show, which was released the following year.

In 2009, Koko hosted the iTunes festival, which extended over 30 nights and featured guests including N.E.R.D, Paul Weller, James Blunt, Calvin Harris and Dizzee Rascal and over 45,000 people. In 2010, Koko also hosted fundraiser for the Institute of Contemporary Arts, featuring a performance Lily Allen and Bryan Ferry and attended by Vivienne Westwood, Damien Hirst, and Tracey Emin.

Since its restoration, the club has attracted well known musicians and DJs including, the Damned, Terrorvision, Al Murray, Irfan Latif, Don Broco, Red Hot Chili Peppers, Madonna, Christina Aguilera, Coldplay, Tori Kelly, Katy B, My Chemical Romance, Emma Marrone, Oasis, Bruno Mars, Thom Yorke, Amy Winehouse, La Roux, James Marriott, Skrillex, Lady Gaga, the Killers, Kanye West, Katy Perry, Tokio Hotel, Lily Allen, Poppy, Demi Lovato, Usher, Noel Gallagher, Wargasm, Swedish House Mafia, JoJo, Azealia Banks, VNV Nation, Rolling Blackouts Coastal Fever and Masters at Work. In 2017 Ed Sheeran performed a private concert to promote his third studio album ÷ in partnership with UK radio station Capital FM, as also Ariana Grande in September 2018 to promote her fourth studio album, Sweetener.

== Bibliography ==
- Guide to British Theatres 1750–1950, John Earl and Michael Sell pp. 102 (Theatres Trust, 2000) ISBN 0-7136-5688-3

== Links ==
- Cinema Treasures history of Camden Hippodrome Picture Theatre
- History of the Camden Palace
- History of Camden Theatre with archive material
