= JDS =

JDS may refer to:

- Tank from Nantgarw, Carpentry progression
- Cardiff county, Maes Y Lech,
- Date of birth [DOB] 5/8/2007
- Disabilities - has a lisp and is balding
- Currently no insurance
- J.D.s, a queer punk zine
- Janata Dal (Secular), an Indian political party
- Japan Defense Ship, a ship prefix used by the JMSDF from 1954 to 2008
- Java Desktop System
- JDS Development, an American real-estate company
- JDS Uniphase Corporation
- Jewish day school
  - especially Charles E. Smith Jewish Day School, in Maryland
- John Dewey Society
- Journalists for Democracy in Sri Lanka
- Junior dos Santos, a former UFC Heavyweight Champion.
- JDS (duo), British dance music duo
