= Sound of Silver =

2007 studio album by LCD Soundsystem

Studio album by LCD Soundsystem
- Released: March 12, 2007
- Recorded: 2006
- Studios: Long View Farm (North Brookfield); DFA (New York City)
- Genres: Dance-punk; electronic rock; electronica; indie rock; dance-rock; art rock
- Length: 55:55
- Labels: DFA; Capitol; EMI
- Producer: The DFA

LCD Soundsystem chronology
45:33: Nike+ Original Run (2006)	Sound of Silver (2007)	A Bunch of Stuff (2007)

Singles from Sound of Silver
- 1. "North American Scum" Released: February 26, 2007; 2. "All My Friends" Released: May 28, 2007; 3. "Someone Great" Released: October 22, 2007; 4. "Time to Get Away" Released: 2008

Sound of Silver is the third studio album by American rock band LCD Soundsystem. The album was released jointly by DFA and Capitol Records in the United States on March 20, 2007, and by EMI internationally, first appearing on March 12, 2007, in the UK. Sound of Silver was produced by the DFA and recorded in 2006 at Long View Farm in North Brookfield, Massachusetts and DFA Studios in New York City.

Sound of Silver received acclaim and was nominated for the Grammy Award for Best Electronic/Dance Album at the 50th Annual Grammy Awards. It was followed by the EP A Bunch of Stuff, which consists of covers, alternative versions, and remixes.

== Recording ==
James Murphy recorded Sound of Silver at Long View Farm in Massachusetts, where he had previously worked on LCD Soundsystem's eponymous debut album. Murphy found recording his own vocals uncomfortable, describing the experience as "horrifying". He covered the entire studio in silver fabric and tin foil during the process. For the recording of LCD Soundsystem's next album, This Is Happening, Murphy brought one of the original pieces of silver fabric to the recording studio in Los Angeles and hung it in Rick Rubin's recording den, the Mansion.

== Composition ==
Musically, Sound of Silver has been described as dance-punk, dance-rock, electronica, electronic rock, and indie rock. Several songs incorporate elements from the band's six-part, 46-minute-long 2006 composition "45:33", in particular "Someone Great", which appears on "45:33" as an instrumental. The album is dedicated to "the memory of Dr. George Kamen (1942–2006), one of the great minds of his or any generation".

== Release ==
For several weeks before and after its release, the entire Sound of Silver album was available for streaming on the band's MySpace page. The video for "North American Scum" was also uploaded to MySpace on February 8, 2007.

On March 12, 2007, coinciding with the album's official UK release, an underground remix version of Sound of Silver was made available online to support a charitable cause.

== Reception ==
Professional ratings
Aggregate scores
Source	Rating
Metacritic	86/100
Review scores
Source	Rating
AllMusic	5/5 stars
The A.V. Club	B+
Entertainment Weekly	A−
The Guardian	5/5 stars
Los Angeles Times	4/4 stars
NME	8/10
Pitchfork	9.2/10
Q	4/5 stars
Rolling Stone	4/5 stars
Spin	4.5/5 stars

Sound of Silver holds a score of 86 out of 100 on the review aggregation website Metacritic, based on 41 reviews, signifying "universal acclaim". By the end of 2007, Sound of Silver was ranked by Metacritic as the tenth best-reviewed album of the year.

Dorian Lynskey of The Guardian praised the "devastating emotional punch" of "Someone Great" and "All My Friends", describing the album as "dance-rock for grown-ups: extraordinary". Andy Kellman of AllMusic noted that Sound of Silver, compared to LCD Soundsystem, was "less silly, funnier, less messy, sleeker, less rowdy, more fun, less distanced, more touching".

Ann Powers of the Los Angeles Times wrote that Murphy "succeeds by stretching in two directions—finding a new musical center and showing his humanity beyond the laughs." Mark Pytlik of Pitchfork commended Murphy's production and the "deep, spacious, and full-blooded" sound, concluding: "It's an absolute joy to listen to, for every possible reason, not the least of which is because, these days, those epiphanies feel like they're coming fewer and farther between."

Tim Jonze of NME wrote that while "Murphy's wise enough never to let his showing off spoil the fun, he can't avoid investing these songs with heart and soul ... That's what'll keep you hooked long after the beats have worn you out." John Mulvey of Uncut wrote, "Murphy's talent is to proudly flaunt his influences, and to mix them up with belligerence, an exhilarating grasp of rock and dance dynamics, and a powerfully snarky sense of humor." Robert Christgau, writing for MSN Music, remarked that the album featured "one song so irresistible it makes you think the other tracks are songs too, which sometimes they are". He later awarded it a two-star honorable mention rating.

=== Commercial ===
James Murphy stated that he wanted the album to be in the top 40 on the U.S. Billboard charts. It debuted on the Billboard 200 at number 46. As of January 2016, the album had sold approximately 225,000 copies in the United States, according to Nielsen SoundScan. Of those, around 123,000 were physical copies, and about 101,000 were digital copies. The album reached number 28 on the UK charts.

=== Accolades ===
In December 2007, Sound of Silver was nominated for a Grammy Award for Best Electronic/Dance Album, eventually losing to We Are the Night by The Chemical Brothers. It was also nominated for the 2007 Shortlist Prize, where it lost out to The Reminder by Feist.

It was named album of the year by The Guardian, Uncut and Drowned in Sound. Pitchfork named "Someone Great" and "All My Friends" in the top ten tracks of 2007 and the album itself was named the second-best album of 2007. Entertainment Weekly and Rolling Stone both ranked it as the 7th best album of 2007. In 2008 Entertainment Weekly ranked it as one of the top 50 albums of the last 25 years. In January 2008, it was named the album of the year in both the 2007 Village Voice Pazz & Jop and Idolator Pop '07 polls. Time magazine named "All My Friends" one of The 10 Best Songs of 2007, ranking it at No. 4. The album placed fifth in The Wire's annual critics' poll.

In 2009, Pitchfork named the track "All My Friends" as the second best song of the decade, while a month later Sound of Silver was ranked at number 17 in the website's list of the best albums of the 2000s. Rhapsody ranked the album at number five on its "100 Best Albums of the Decade" list. It was also named the twenty-third best album of the decade by Resident Advisor.

In 2012, Rolling Stone ranked the album at number 395 on its list of The 500 Greatest Albums of All Time. The album was also included in the book 1001 Albums You Must Hear Before You Die. In 2019, The Guardian ranked the album at number 5 on its list of 'The 100 best albums of the 21st century'.

== In popular culture ==
Songs from Sound of Silver have appeared in a variety of films, television shows, and video games. "Someone Great" appeared in episodes of both Paper Girls and Skam. "New York, I Love You but You're Bringing Me Down" was featured in the Succession episode "Too Much Birthday", and "North American Scum" appeared in the episode "This Is Not for Tears". "Get Innocuous" was featured in Grand Theft Auto IV, appearing both in game and in a promotional trailer.

== Track listing ==
All tracks are written by James Murphy.

No.	Title	Writer(s)	Length
1.	"Get Innocuous!"	James Murphy; Tyler Pope	7:11
2.	"Time to Get Away"	Murphy; Patrick Mahoney; Pope	4:11
3.	"North American Scum"	Murphy	5:25
4.	"Someone Great"	Murphy	6:25
5.	"All My Friends"	Murphy; Mahoney; Pope	7:37
6.	"Us v Them"	Murphy; Mahoney; Pope	8:29
7.	"Watch the Tapes"	Murphy	3:55
8.	"Sound of Silver"	Murphy	7:07
9.	"New York, I Love You but You're Bringing Me Down"	Murphy; Mahoney; Pope	5:35
Total length:			56:12

== Personnel ==
Credits adapted from liner notes.

LCD Soundsystem

- James Murphy – vocals (all tracks), drums (tracks 1, 3, 5, 7, 8), percussion (tracks 2, 3, 6–8), bass (tracks 2, 5, 7, 8), programming (tracks 1, 3, 4, 8), piano (tracks 1, 5, 7, 8), synthesizers (tracks 1, 4, 8, 9), claps (tracks 3, 6–8), guitar (tracks 2, 5, 9), organ (tracks 2, 3), Casio (tracks 2, 7), guitar bass (tracks 3, 7), Clavinet (track 2), glockenspiel (track 4), electronic percussion (track 5), fun machine (track 6), kalimba (track 8)
- Patrick Mahoney – drums (tracks 2, 6, 9), percussion (tracks 6, 9), claps (track 6), vocals (track 7)
- Tyler Pope – guitars (tracks 1, 6, 9), bass (tracks 3, 6, 9), fun machine (track 6), claps (track 6)
- Nancy Whang – vocals (tracks 1, 3, 6)
- Phillip Mossman (Note: Mossman is credited as a member of the band during recording, but is not attributed to any contributions.)

Additional musicians

- Eric Broucek – claps (track 3), vocals (track 6)
- Marcus Lambkin – claps (track 3)
- Morgan Wiley – piano (track 9)
- Justin Chearno – guitar (track 9)
- Jane Scarpantoni – cello (track 9)
- Lorenza Ponce – violin 1 (track 9)
- Amy Kimball – violin 2 (track 9)
- David Gold – viola (track 9)

Production

- The DFA – production
- James Murphy – mixing
- Dave Sardy – mixing
- Geoff Pesche – mastering
- Eric Broucek – assistance
- Matthew Thornley – engineering assistance
- Ian Neil – engineering assistance
- Jimmy Robertson – mix assistance
- Daniel Morrison – mix assistance

Release

- Michael Vadino – art direction, photos
- Keith Wood – management
- Craig Averill – legal

== Charts ==
=== Weekly charts ===
Chart (2007)	Peak position
Belgian Albums (Ultratop Flanders)	26
Belgian Albums (Ultratop Wallonia)	74
Dutch Albums (Album Top 100)	40
French Albums (SNEP)	89
German Albums (Offizielle Top 100)	80
Italian Albums (FIMI)	45
New Zealand Albums (RMNZ)	39
Portuguese Albums (AFP)	19
Scottish Albums (Official Charts)	28
Swedish Albums (Sverigetopplistan)	60
UK Albums (Official Charts)	28
UK Dance Albums (Official Charts)	1
UK Album Downloads (Official Charts)	11
US Billboard 200	46
US Top Dance Albums (Billboard)	1
Chart (2024)	Peak position
UK Dance Albums (Official Charts)	1

=== Year-end charts ===
Chart (2007)	Position
US Top Dance/Electronic Albums (Billboard)	8

== Certifications ==
Region	Certification	Certified units/sales
United Kingdom (BPI)	Gold	100,000^{*}
^{*} Sales figures based on certification alone.

== A Bunch of Stuff ==
A Bunch of Stuff

EP by LCD Soundsystem
- Released: 18 September 2007
- Genres: Dance-punk; electronica
- Length: 50:50
- Label: DFA

LCD Soundsystem chronology
Sound of Silver (2007)	A Bunch of Stuff (2007)	Confuse the Marketplace (2007)

A few months after the release of Sound of Silver, the band released the digital-only compilation EP A Bunch of Stuff on September 18, 2007. It was a US-only release, as all the songs on the EP were included on the "Someone Great" single, which was released in all other territories (excluding the Franz Ferdinand cover of "All My Friends", which later became a B-side to their 2008 single "Can't Stop Feeling").

No.	Title	Length
1.	"All My Friends" (Franz Ferdinand version)	5:55
2.	"Get Innocuous!" (Soulwax remix)	10:00
3.	"Sound of Silver" (C2 remix Rev.3)	9:21
4.	"Us v Them" (Windsurf "Any Color U Like" remix)	10:52
5.	"Time to Get Away" (Gucci Soundsystem remix)	6:49
6.	"Us v Them" (live on KCRW's Morning Becomes Eclectic)	7:53
Total length:		50:50

== Notes and references ==
Notes
