= Live at the 100 Club =

Live at the 100 Club may refer to:

- Live at the 100 Club, a 2006 EP by The Automatic
- Live at the 100 Club, a 1976 album by The Damned
- Live at the 100 Club, a 1977 album by The Jam
- Live at the 100 Club, a 2014 album by The Pretty Things
