= Love Crime (disambiguation) =

Love Crime is a 2010 French psychological suspense thriller directed by Alain Corneau.

Love Crime or Love Crimes may also refer to:

- "Love Crime" (song), 2015 song by Siouxsie
- Love Crimes (album), 2000 debut album by American R&B duo Ruff Endz
- "Love Crime", a song by Westlife from World of Our Own
- Love Crimes, 2016 album by American Armenian DJ Super Sako
- Love Crimes (film), 1992 thriller film directed by Lizzie Borden
- "Love Crimes", a song by Hayden Thorpe from Diviner

== See also ==
- "If Love Was a Crime", song by Bulgarian singer Poli Genova
- "Love Is a Crime", song by American pop singer Anastacia
- Love Crimes of Kabul, 2011 documentary film following select cases of inmates at Badam Bagh women's prison in Kabul, Afghanistan
