= Graham Gold =

British DJ (born 1954)

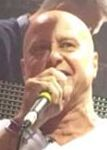
- Gold at the Peach Camden 2014 Reunion
- Born: Graham Gold; 5 July 1954 (age 71); London, England
- Occupations: Record producer, songwriter, disc jockey, television presenter, entrepreneur
- Years active: 1975–present
- Title: DJ Graham Gold
- Website: grahamgold.com

Graham Gold (born 5 July 1954) is a British DJ. Gold is primarily known as a DJ whose sets were broadcast live Friday nights on Kiss and distributed on the Universal Music TV label. These weekly live broadcasts were considered revolutionary in the industry. Gold's popular weekly show played a major role in Kiss FM growing into a radio powerhouse. Gold was ranked No. 83 by Dash Berlin in Dash's "Most Popular DJs in the World of All Time." He is the father of Trance producer Ben Gold.

== Early years ==
At age 15, Gold started as a DJ at a mobile disco with friend named Duncan Uren, called the Funky Road Show. In 1975 Gold opened a night club, called Champers located at the Railway Hotel in Greenford. In Gold 1978 joined Royalty team in Southgate, London and also worked as a DJ on Southgate, London hospital's radio station. From 1980 to 1989 Gold worked as a DJ at Gullivers located in Mayfair. Gold was also a DJ on JFM, which was part of Pirate radio in the United Kingdom and also played Radio London Soul Night Out.

== KISS FM years ==
On 1 September 1990, Kiss went on air and Gold played his first show on the station on launch day. Gold was assigned the breakfast show and chart show. In 1993 when Judge Jules and Danny Rampling left for BBC Radio 1, Gold inherited their show and began his run at what later became the famous Friday night show. Gold's weekly shows would end on KISS FM in 2003.

== Rise to fame as DJ ==
In 1993, Peach nightclub was opened at Camden Palace Theatre by Kiss owners, and Gold was hired to DJ at the nightclub and also be the front-man. Peach and Kiss provided the platform that would launch him internationally, and eventually Gold was 8 times listed in DJ Magazine's Top 100 Poll and sold 700,000 albums, seven of which gold. Gold has played at Glastonbury Festival, Homelands, Gatecrasher, Godskitchen, Passion, Slinky, Impulz, Earthdance, World Electronic Music Festival, Summadayze, Pacha Group, Es Paradis, Ku (now called Privilege Ibiza), Full Moon Party, and Street Parade. Gold's residency at Peach would end in 2004 when Camden Palace Theatre was purchased by Oliver Bengough who terminated Peach's lease, and thereby ending Gold's 11-year run as its DJ and front-man. On 4 May 2014, Gold headlined the Peach Camden Palace Reunion, which was held at Camden Palace Theatre.

== Commercial and TV endeavours ==
In addition to working both as a live and radio DJ, Gold also works as a commercial voice over artist and has done work for ITV, BBC, and Sky Television. Gold in 1995 also ran a dance record label, also called Peach, for Pete Waterman. Gold was also a presenter on the ITV show called BPM.

== Residency in Thailand ==
Gold presently lives in Ko Pha-ngan, Thailand. Gold plays regularly at various venues in Thailand, including the Full Moon Party, CULTUREONE in Bangkok, and globally. Gold also has a regular radio program called Trancedayze, which is syndicated by various radio programs. Gold plays in Ko Pha-ngan at various venues including Merkaba Beach Club.

== Discography ==
=== Singles and EPs ===
- The Lost City (12"), Moonlite, 1997
- Peak Time (3 versions), good:as, 1998
- How Do You Feel (12"), good:as, 1999
- Fresh & Green / Too Blue (12"), good:as, 2001
- High Lady (2 versions), good:as, 2002
- The Ending / Double A (3 versions), Relative Records, 2003
- Graham Gold vs. B'Jammin – Golden Sun, Relative Records, 2003
- Nightdive (3 versions), Relative Records, 2004
- The Rest Of Us / The Beacon (12"), Relative Records, 2005
- Culebra (2 versions), Relative Records, 2006
- Moving On / Glorified (12", Promo, Ltd), Flux Delux, 2007
- Maze* vs. Graham Gold – Joy (12"), Not On Label, Unknown, DJ Mixes
- Graham Gold / Graeme Park – Kissmix 96 (2xCD, Comp, Mixed), Universal Music TV (aka PolyGram TV), 1996
- Graham Gold & Tony De Vit – Kiss Mix 97 (2xCD, Mixed), Universal Music TV (aka PolyGram TV), 1997
- Full of Beans (2xCD, Comp, Mixed), Urban Collective, 1997
- Alex P & Brandon Block / Graham Gold – Kiss Mix 98 (2xCD, Comp, Mixed), Universal Music TV (aka PolyGram TV), 1998
- Golden Showers (2xCD, Comp, Mixed), Dance The Potato Bop / Tigger, 1999
- Room at the Top > AudioV2/1999 CD, Comp, Mixed) Tilllate Magazine, formerly M8, 1999
- House Mix (CD Comp mix)

1999. Fast Car Magazine

- The Taste of Peach (CD, Mixed) Tilllate Magazine, formerly M8, 2002
- GG02 (CD, Comp, Mixed) Trust The DJ, 2003

=== Miscellaneous ===
- Living in the Now File, MP3, 320, Discover Digital, 2010
- Tristan (14) vs Graham Gold – Silver & Gold, Relative Records
