= Darren Pearce =

British dance music disc jockey

- Genres: trance music, breakbeat
- Occupation(s): disc jockey, record producer
- Labels: React Music, FFRR

Darren Pearce is a British electronic dance music disc jockey and record producer. Active from the 1990s, he has been a resident DJ at several London club nights and has UK chart success for both his mixing and as part of the music duos Gems for Jem and JDS.

== Biography ==
Pearce started his career performing at events he setup himself, gradually getting bookings from promoters, until he was noticed by Graham Gold and became resident DJ at club night Peach where he stayed for 11 years. He was also resident DJ at a number of other London club nights, including Sunny Side Up, and Trinity. Pearce released music under the name Bass Construction, with the 1990 record "The E.P." which included the techno breakbeat track "Check How We Jam". He was also a member of the group Massivo, which had a top 25 hit in July 1990 with a cover of "Lovin' You".

In 1991, with Steve McCutcheon, Pearce remixed and reissued the Frances Nero single "Footsteps Following Me". Pearce and McCutcheon also joined forces to form the duo Gems for Jem. Their single "Lifting Me Higher", sampling "High Energy", topped the UK Dance Chart in May 1995. By 1998 he was considered one of the "top 10 [DJs] in London".

Partnering with Julian Napolitano, Pearce formed the house and breakbeat music duo JDS, active from the mid-1990s. Their track "Nine Ways" was a club anthem in 1997, and peaked at number 4 on the UK Dance Chart that same year, with Pearce also contributing the breakbeat remix. In May 1998, the JDS single "London Town" peaked at number 49 on the UK Singles Chart. In 2000 Muzik magazine stated their release "Destiny Calls" was one of the "most memorable dancefloor moments of the millennium", and in 2001, a JDS remix of earlier hit "Nine Ways" was released, peaking at number 47 on the UK Singles Chart. In 2005 the duo released the album The Adventures of the Purple Funky Monkey, as well as the single "Purple Funky Monkey", which brought humour into the typically "austere" electronic music scene. By 2007, the duo were becoming known as one of the "hottest breakbeat production teams in the world".

In 1999, Pearce entered the DJ Mag list of the world's top 100 DJs, at number 61. His album Sunnyside Up: Chapter 1, mixed with John 00 Fleming, peaked at number 79 in the UK Compilation Chart in June the same year. Pearce mixed several of the Reactivate trance music compilation album series, including volumes 16 and 18 which peaked at numbers 29 and 58 on the UK Compilation Chart in 2000 and 2001 respectively.

As of 2015, Pearce continues to release music, with his single "Bullshit Man", released on Absolution Digital, garnering a 9* review in Mixmag as "the perfect bridge track between hard dance and hardstyle".

== Discography ==
Mix albums
Title	Mixed by	Year	Peak UK Comp
Sunnyside Up: Chapter 1	Darren Pearce & John 00 Fleming	1999	79
Reactivate 15 - Harry The Hammerhead's Pounding Trance Jawbreakers	Darren Pearce	1999	37
Reactivate 16	Darren Pearce	2000	29
Reactivate 17	Darren Pearce	2000	32
Golden	Darren Pearce	2000	
Reactivate 18	Darren Pearce	2001	58

Selected Singles
Title	Artist/Alias	Year	Peak UK singles	Peak UK dance
"Check How We Jam"	Bass Construction	1990		
"Lovin' You"	Massivo (with Steve McCutcheon, Jon Jules, Tracy Ackerman)	1990	25	
"Footsteps Following Me"	Frances Nero (Steve McCutcheon & Darren Pearce mix)	1991	17	
"Dance With Power"	Bass Construction	1992	100	
"Lifting Me Higher"	Gems for Jem (with Steve McCutcheon)	1994	28	1
"Nine Ways"	JDS (with Julian Napolitano)	1997	61	4
"London Town"	JDS (with Julian Napolitano)	1998	49	10
"Destiny Calls"	JDS (with Julian Napolitano)	2000		
"Nine Ways"	JDS (with Julian Napolitano)	2001	47	2
"Bullshit Man"	Darren Pearce	2015		
