= Massivo =

English rave band

- Origin: London, England
- Genres: Dance music
- Years active: 1990–91
- Label: Debut Edge Records

Massivo was a short-lived electronic music group who had a top 30 hit single in the UK in 1990.

== History ==
The group was made up of Steve McCutcheon, Jon Jules, and Darren Pearce with Tracy Ackerman - who had worked with McCutcheon's father Les in Shakatak and This Year's Blonde - on lead vocals and being given a specific credit.

The group's only hit single was a cover of the Minnie Riperton hit "Lovin' You", which peaked at no. 25 in the UK singles charts in July 1990, and spent nearly three months in the top 75. The group performed the song on Top of the Pops the week before it peaked. The song "bubbled under" in Australia, only reaching no. 151.

Massivo released at least two other singles ("Kingdom of Love" with Jackie Rawe and "Take My Hand") but never made the charts again.
