= Tribulations (song) =

Single by LCD Soundsystem

from the album LCD Soundsystem
- Released: 27 September 2005
- Genre: Electropop
- Length: 4:59 (album version); 3:52 (radio edit)
- Label: DFA
- Songwriter(s): James Murphy
- Producer(s): The DFA

LCD Soundsystem singles chronology
"Disco Infiltrator" (2005)	"Tribulations" (2005)	"45:33" (2006)

"Tribulations" is a 2005 song by LCD Soundsystem. It is the seventh single from the band's eponymous debut album. The single's cover was designed by Michael Vadino for DFA Design.

== Use in popular culture ==
The song is featured in the opening theme to the Sound Opinions radio show, the 2005 video game Project Gotham Racing 3, the 2006 video game Driver: Parallel Lines, and The Office episode "Night Out". It is additionally a playable song in Dance Dance Revolution: Hottest Party 2.

== Music video ==
The video for "Tribulations" was first aired in August 2005. It was directed by Dougal Wilson and produced by Colonel Blimp. It features James Murphy walking around through various screens, sometimes walking out of a screen into the real setting just to walk back into the next screen.

== Track listing ==
=== CD ===
1. "Tribulations" (Edit) – 3:52
2. "Tribulations" (Tiga's Out of the Trance Closet Mix) – 6:02

=== 7" ===
A. "Tribulations" (Edit) – 3:52
B. "Tribulations" (Shallow Version) – 4:45

=== 12" ===
A1. "Tribulations" (Album Version) – 5:01
A2. "Tribulations" (Tiga's Out of the Trance Closet Mix) – 6:02
B. "Tribulations" (Lindstrom Mix) – 7:56
