= North American Scum =

Single by LCD Soundsystem

from the album Sound of Silver
- B-side: "Hippie Priest Bum-Out"; Remixes
- Released: February 26, 2007
- Recorded: 2006
- Genre: Synth-rock
- Length: 5:26 (album version); 3:46 (radio edit)
- Label: DFA
- Songwriter: James Murphy
- Producer: The DFA

LCD Soundsystem singles chronology
"45:33" (2006)	"North American Scum" (2007)	"All My Friends" (2007)

"North American Scum" is a song by American rock band LCD Soundsystem. It was released as the lead single from their second studio album, Sound of Silver, on February 26, 2007 as a digital download and on other formats on March 5, 2007. It peaked at number 24 on the Belgian Flanders Tip chart and number 40 on the UK Singles Chart. The song was also frequently used to open up The Ron and Fez Show on XM Satellite Radio and was also featured in the 2008 film Step Brothers as well as the video games Saints Row 2, Top Spin 4, and Grand Theft Auto VI.

== Music video ==
The music video for "North American Scum" was directed by Benjamin Dickinson. It features James Murphy initially in a photo shoot, then entering space via a door, planting a DFA Records flag on the moon and engaging Pat Mahoney in a fight on the moon being cheered on by Tyler Pope and Nancy Whang, and finally leaving space through another door where he meets himself, Mahoney and Whang in a room filled with leaves.

== Madison Square Garden performance ==
During the band's farewell performance on April 2, 2011 at Madison Square Garden, the band was joined onstage for "North American Scum" by several members of Arcade Fire, who sang backing vocals.

== Track listing ==
=== 7" ===
A. "North American Scum"
B. "Hippie Priest Bum-Out"

=== 12" ===
A1. "North American Scum"
A2. "North American Scum" (Kris Menace Remix)
B. "North American Scum" (Onastic Dub Mix by James Murphy and Eric Broucek)

=== CD ===
1. "North American Scum"
2. "North American Scum" (Kris Menace Remix)
3. "North American Scum" (Onastic Dub Mix by James Murphy and Eric Broucek)
4. "Hippie Priest Bum-Out"
5. "North American Scum" (Video)

== Charts ==
Chart (2007)	Peak position
Belgium (Ultratip Bubbling Under Flanders)	24
UK Singles (Official Charts)	40
