= Daphna Ziman =

Daphna Edwards Ziman is an Israeli American philanthropist, author, film producer, and director. She was the president of the television network Cinémoi. She was married to Richard Ziman.

Ziman was a top fundraiser for the 2008 Hillary Clinton presidential campaign.

In 2016, Ziman listed her Beverly Hills home for $40 million.

She authored the novel The Gray Zone which features a protagonist who was orphaned as a child.
