= Live at the 100 Club (The Jam album) =

Live album by The Jam
- Released: 2015
- Recorded: 11 September 1977
- Genre: Punk rock
- Label: Polydor

Live at the 100 Club is a live album by The Jam, recorded on 11 September 1977 at London's 100 Club. The album was released in 2015 on CD as part of the box set Fire and Skill – The Jam Live, and in 2016 as a double album on vinyl.

== Track listing ==
First disc

No.	Title	Length
1.	"I've Changed My Address"
2.	"Carnaby Street"
3.	"The Modern World"
4.	"Time for Truth"
5.	"So Sad About Us"
6.	"In the Street Today"
7.	"Standards"
8.	"All Around the World"
9.	"London Traffic"
10.	"Heatwave"
11.	"London Girl"

Second disc

No.	Title	Length
1.	"Sweet Soul Music"
2.	"Bricks and Mortar"
3.	"In the City"
4.	"Art School"
5.	"Back in My Arms Again"
6.	"Slow Down"
7.	"In the Midnight Hour"
8.	"Sounds from the Street"
9.	"Takin' My Love"
10.	"In the City"

== Personnel ==
The Jam

- Paul Weller – vocals, lead guitar, bass guitar, keyboards, backing vocals
- Rick Buckler – drums, percussion
- Bruce Foxton – vocals, bass guitar, rhythm guitar, backing vocals
