= All My Friends (LCD Soundsystem song) =

2007 song by LCD Soundsystem

- Digital release cover art

Single by LCD Soundsystem

from the album Sound of Silver
- B-side: "Freak Out / Starry Eyes"; "No Love Lost"; Franz Ferdinand version; John Cale version; Harvey Mix
- Released: May 28, 2007
- Recorded: 2006
- Genre: Dance-rock; krautrock
- Length: 7:38 (album version); 4:27 (video edit); 4:11 (short edit)
- Label: DFA; EMI
- Songwriters: Pat Mahoney; James Murphy; Tyler Pope
- Producer: The DFA

LCD Soundsystem singles chronology
"North American Scum" (2007)	"All My Friends" (2007)	"Someone Great" (2007)

Alternative cover
- Cover art for the CD release

"All My Friends" is a song by American rock band LCD Soundsystem. It was released as the second single from their second studio album Sound of Silver on May 28, 2007 and was written by Pat Mahoney, James Murphy, and Tyler Pope. The song received acclaim from critics and has appeared on many year-end and all time lists. It peaked at #41 on the UK Singles Chart. B-sides for the single include covers of the song by Scottish indie rock band Franz Ferdinand and former Velvet Underground member John Cale. The song was featured in the trailer for the 2024 movie IF.

== Reception ==
"All My Friends" was named the #1 song of 2007 by Pitchfork. In 2009, Pitchfork listed the song at #2 of their Top 500 Tracks of the 2000s.

It was selected by Guardian Unlimited readers as the best single of 2007. Time magazine named "All My Friends" one of The 10 Best Songs of 2007, ranking it at #4. Rolling Stone ranked "All My Friends" as the 41st best song of the 2000s. In October 2011, NME placed it at number 118 on its list "150 Best Tracks of the Past 15 Years". Rolling Stone went on to place the song at number 87 on its 2021 list of the 500 Greatest Songs of all time.

== Music video ==
The music video for "All My Friends" features a single shot of James Murphy wearing face paint and singing into the camera. As the video progresses, keyboardist Nancy Whang and drummer Pat Mahoney are seen reflected in mirrors behind Murphy. The video was directed by Tom Kuntz.

== Composition ==
"All My Friends" is built on a repetitive piano melody in the key of A major, gradually increasing in volume and dynamics through the duration of the song.

== Track listing ==
=== 7" Part One ===
Side A
No.	Title	Length
1.	"All My Friends" (Franz Ferdinand version)	6:06

Side B
No.	Title	Length
1.	"All My Friends" (Edit)	5:59

=== 7" Part Two ===
Side A
No.	Title	Length
1.	"All My Friends" (John Cale version)	7:38

Side B
No.	Title	Length
1.	"All My Friends"	7:38

=== 12" ===
Side A
No.	Title	Length
1.	"All My Friends" (Harvey mix)	7:02
2.	"All My Friends"	7:38

Side B
No.	Title	Length
1.	"Freak Out / Starry Eyes"	12:20

=== CD ===
No.	Title	Length
1.	"All My Friends" (Edit)	5:59
2.	"All My Friends" (Franz Ferdinand version)	6:06
3.	"Freak Out / Starry Eyes"	12:20
4.	"All My Friends" (Video)	4:27

=== iTunes EP ===
Digital download
No.	Title	Length
1.	"All My Friends"	7:42
2.	"All My Friends" (John Cale version)	7:38
3.	"No Love Lost"	3:40
4.	"Freak Out / Starry Eyes"	12:22

== Charts ==
Chart (2007)	Peak position
UK Singles (Official Charts)	41

== Personnel ==
- James Murphy – vocals, drums, bass guitar, piano, guitars, keyboards, electric percussion

== Certifications ==
Certifications for "All My Friends"
Region	Certification	Certified units/sales
New Zealand (RMNZ)	Gold	15,000^{‡}
United Kingdom (BPI)	Silver	200,000^{‡}
^{‡} Sales+streaming figures based on certification alone.

== Franz Ferdinand version ==
"All My Friends"

Song by Franz Ferdinand

from the album A Bunch of Stuff
- A-side: "Can't Stop Feeling"
- Recorded: 2007
- Genre: Post-punk revival; alternative rock
- Length: 5:56
- Label: Domino
- Songwriters: Pat Mahoney; James Murphy; Tyler Pope
- Producer: Erol Alkan

Scottish indie rock band Franz Ferdinand covered the song as part of the LCD Soundsystem EP A Bunch of Stuff, which was released on September 18, 2007. Their version also appears on the first 7" and CD formats of the original song and as the b-side to their single "Can't Stop Feeling". A music video for the cover was also made, which was directed by Anna McCarthy, the sister of band member Nick McCarthy.

=== Track listing ===
7" vinyl

- Domino – RUG331

Side A
No.	Title	Length
1.	"Can't Stop Feeling"	3:03

Side B
No.	Title	Length
1.	"All My Friends"	5:56

== Other versions ==
- In 2011, American electronic musician Baths performed a cover of the song for The A.V. Club's A.V. Undercover web series.
- In 2011, Canadian indie rock band Tokyo Police Club covered the song for a collaboration with Polaroid.
- Australian alternative rock band Gang of Youths covered the song at the Triple J radio station.
