= 45:33 Remixes =

Remix album by LCD Soundsystem
- Released: September 14, 2009
- Genres: Dance-punk; electronica
- Label: DFA

LCD Soundsystem chronology
Confuse the Marketplace (2007)	45:33 Remixes (2009)	This Is Happening (2010)

45:33 Remixes is an album by LCD Soundsystem consisting entirely of remixes of their 2006 release 45:33. It was released as a series of 12" singles and a CD compilation on September 14, 2009.

== Critical reception ==
Professional ratings
Review scores
Source	Rating
Pitchfork	(5.1/10.0)

== Track listing ==
=== CD Compilation ===
1. "45:33" Part 1 (Runaway Remix)
2. "45:33" Part 2 (Prince Language Remix)
3. "45:33" Part 3/4 (Prins Thomas Diskomiks Remix)
4. "45:33" Part 4 (Theo Parrish's Space Cadet Remix)
5. "45:33" Part 4 (Trus' Me Remix)
6. "45:33" Part 4 (Padded Cell Remix)
7. "45:33" Part 5 (Pilooski Remix)
8. "45:33" Part 6 (Riley Reinhold Remix)

=== Vinyl singles ===
1. "45:33" (Prins Thomas Diskomiks Remix)/"45:33" (Runaway Remix)
2. "45:33" (Riley Reinhold Remix)/"45:33" (Trus' Me Remix)
3. "45:33" (Pilooski Remix)/"45:33" (Theo Parrish's Space Cadet Remix)
4. "45:33" (Padded Cell Remix)/"45:33" (Prince Language Remix)
