= Love Crime (song) =

Single by Siouxsie

from the album Hannibal Season 3 – Volume 2 (Original Television Soundtrack)
- Released: 4 December 2015
- Recorded: 2015
- Genre: Alternative rock
- Length: 4:59
- Label: Hunger
- Songwriters: Siouxsie Sioux; Brian Reitzell
- Producer: Brian Reitzell

Siouxsie singles chronology
"About to Happen" (2008)	"Love Crime" (2015)

"Love Crime" is a song by Siouxsie. Her first release in eight years, it was featured in the finale of the TV series Hannibal, broadcast in August 2015.

== Background ==
Series creator Bryan Fuller, who had contacted her in November 2014, described the song (composed by Siouxsie with Brian Reitzell) as "epic". Reitzell had previously worked for Siouxsie in 2006 for the Marie Antoinette soundtrack when he re-orchestrated the introduction of Siouxsie and the Banshees's debut single "Hong Kong Garden" with strings players for Sofia Coppola's film.

On recording the song, Siouxsie has stated:

"Since those wonderful shows at The Royal Festival Hall in 2013, it's been a frustrating stop start to feed my soul and make some new music. Then along came a tasty morsel from Brian Reitzell working on the soundtrack for the final Hannibal series. I was already a huge fan and before I knew it, I was taking a nibble out of Hannibal and getting stuck in. Thank you Hannibal – at long last my appetite is back again."

== Releases ==
Two different versions of the song were released. "Love Crime (Amuse-Bouche Version)" was made available for digital download on 4 December 2015.

The song became available for streaming in 2022.
