= Cinémoi =

- Broadcast area: United States
- Headquarters: Los Angeles

Programming
- Language: English
- Picture format: 16:9, 576i (SDTV)

Ownership
- Owner: MVM
- Key people: Daphna Ziman, Roderick Sherwood III

History
- Launched: February 23, 2009; 17 years ago

Links
- Website: www.cinemoi.tv

Cinémoi is a television network focusing on film, fashion and international style.

== History ==
Cinémoi was founded in 2009 by Oliver Bengough of Mint Entertainment. British broadcaster Jonathan Ross joined Cinémoi in December 2010, becoming the channel's creative director and minority shareholder.

Olly Bengough and Cinémoi formed a joint venture with Daphna Edwards Ziman and Rod Sherwood of Multi Vision Media (MVM) to launch Cinémoi in North America on September 17, 2012, broadcasting to over 20 million households, as the first network on DirecTV dedicated to film, fashion, and lifestyle. However, it was dropped by DirecTV in July 2013.

Subsequently, Cinémoi began broadcasting on Verizon/FiOS on January 27, 2014. It also is available in the United States on Frontier Communications, Sling TV, Samsung TV, Apple TV, Apple iOS, Google Play and Xfinity.

In August 2024, Cinémoi filed for Chapter 11 bankruptcy protection with over $10 million in debt. On January 17, 2025, Cinémoi converted their Chapter 11 case to a Chapter 7 bankruptcy liquidation.

== Programming ==
Cinémoi premium programming includes live and prerecorded content with a focus on acclaimed international film, film festivals, and fashion, covering an array of global events, including the Cannes Film Festival, Paris, New York, Milan and London fashion weeks and the exclusive broadcast of the CinéFashion Film Awards.

=== United States ===
Cinémoi North America offers daily afternoon and evening movies — ranging from CinéCouture, CinéDirectors, CinéGreen, CinéIcons and CinéStars. Some of the films that have aired on the U.S. channel are Alegria, featuring Oscar-winner Frank Langella; Contempt, starring Brigitte Bardot and Jack Palance; Dangerous Beauty with Jacqueline Bisset and Naomi Watts; Yann Arthus-Bertrand's Earth from Above; Fellini: I’m A Born Liar, directed by Damian Pettigrew; Five Easy Pieces, starring Jack Nicholson; Gilda and Lady from Shanghai, featuring Rita Hayworth; Redacted, directed by Brian De Palma; Roman Polanski's Repulsion starring Catherine Deneuve; and Two Lovers, with a cast headed by Gwyneth Paltrow and Joaquin Phoenix.

In addition, the U.K. late night talk show, the Jonathan Ross Show, debuted on Cinémoi N. America on December 24, 2012. Guests have included David Beckham, Sandra Bullock, Eminem, Gordon Ramsay, Justin Timberlake, and Oprah Winfrey.

Also, beginning in the Fall 2015 Cinémoi began broadcasting three dramatic series: Falcon, based on the bestselling novels of crime writer Robert Wilson; Lucan, the true story of an aristocrat living a dark life beneath a polished public image; and Underbelly: Razor, set in the crime culture of Sydney, Australia during the roaring ’20s and ’30s.

=== Production ===
On July 27, 2014, Cinémoi produced its 1st International Fashion Film Awards show (IFFAs) at the Saban Theatre in Beverly Hills. Hosted by Jonathan Ross and actress/singer Jordin Sparks, the ceremony honored the best fashion film shorts from around the world and the talent who created and starred in them. Joan and Melissa Rivers were among the icons recognized that year, for the way their E! show, Live From The Red Carpet, changed the way in which fashion is seen and packaged on television. The IFFAs also featured several live performances, including Cirque du Soleil’s avant-garde Couture Runway Presentation filled with fashion from their shows in Las Vegas, and the World Premiere of the single “Miss Incredible” by singer/songwriter Mark Ballas, of Dancing with the Stars. Presenters included Lance Bass, Tyson Beckford, and Kristin Cavallari. And the show was a ‘Finalist Award Winner’ in the 2015 New York Festival's World's Best TV & Films Competition.

The 2nd IFFAs took place on October 25, 2015, also at the Saban, and were hosted by ABC's Dancing With the Stars champion Cheryl Burke and former star of E!’s Fashion Police, George Kotsiopoulous. The Supremes were presented the Timeless Icon Award, and founding member Mary Wilson accepted on behalf of the group before singing “I am Changing” and “You Can’t Hurry Love.” Additionally, there was a tribute to the 20th anniversary of the pop culture film, Clueless, a “Next Generation” Icon award given to X Factor contestant singer-songwriter Eden xo, and the ‘Stylist of the Year’ honor went to Johnny Wujek, the stylist behind Katy Perry, and a past judge on America’s Next Top Model.

== See also ==
- List of French-language television channels
