= Siouxsie Sioux =

British singer (born 1957)

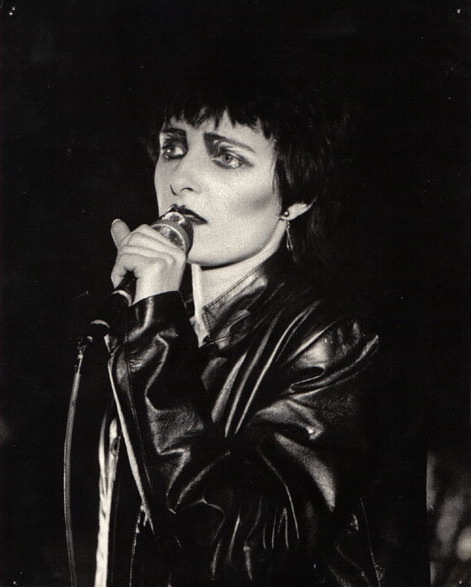
- Siouxsie Sioux performing in 1980

Background information
- Born: Susan Janet Ballion; 27 May 1957 (age 69); Southwark, London, England
- Genres: Post-punk; new wave; gothic rock; alternative rock
- Occupations: Singer; songwriter; musician; record producer
- Instruments: Vocals; guitar; keyboards; percussion
- Years active: 1976–present
- Labels: Polydor; Geffen; Sioux Records; Sanctuary; W14; Universal; Decca
- Formerly of: Siouxsie and the Banshees; The Creatures
- Spouse: Budgie (m. 1991; div. 2006)
- Website: siouxsie.com

Susan Janet Ballion (born 27 May 1957), known as Siouxsie Sioux (/ˌsuːzi ˈsuː/, soo-zee-SOO), is an English singer and songwriter. She came to prominence as the vocalist and main lyricist of the rock band Siouxsie and the Banshees. They released 11 studio albums from 1978 to 1995, and had several UK top twenty singles including "Hong Kong Garden" (1978), "Happy House" (1980) and "Peek-a-Boo" (1988), plus a top 25 single in the US Billboard Hot 100 with "Kiss Them for Me" (1991).

Siouxsie also formed a second group, the Creatures, in 1981. With the Creatures, she released four studio albums, and achieved a UK top-twenty single "Right Now" (1983). In the mid-2000s, she has continued as a solo artist, using the name Siouxsie, and released the critically acclaimed album Mantaray (2007).

AllMusic named Siouxsie as "one of the most influential British singers of the rock era". Her songs have been covered by Jeff Buckley ("Killing Time"), Tricky ("Tattoo") and LCD Soundsystem ("Slowdive") and sampled by Massive Attack ("Metal Postcard") and the Weeknd ("Happy House"). In 2011, she was awarded for Outstanding Contribution to Music at the Q Awards and in 2012, she received the Inspiration Award at the Ivor Novello Awards.

== Biography ==
=== Early life (1957–1976) ===
Siouxsie was born Susan Janet Ballion on 27 May 1957 at Guy's Hospital in Southwark, England. Her older sister and brother were born while the family lived in the Belgian Congo. Her parents met there and worked for a few years. Her mother, Elizabeth, was of Scottish and English descent and was a secretary who spoke both French and English. Her father, Marc, was a bacteriologist who milked venom from snakes, and came from Wallonia, the French-speaking part of Belgium. In the mid-1950s, before Siouxsie's birth, the family moved to England.

The Ballions lived in a suburban district in Chislehurst, Kent. Siouxsie was an isolated child, being unable to invite friends to her house because of her alcoholic, unemployed father. Despite his issues, Siouxsie regarded him as intelligent and well-read, and sympathised with his inability to fit in with a "rigid, middle-class society". During moments of sobriety, her father shared with her his love for books. Siouxsie was aware that her family was different. Her mother was in control of the household and did everything. "She didn't really have the choice. I grew up thinking it normal that women went out to work, mended fuses or mowed the lawn". Siouxsie saw her mother as a strong woman; "she kept the family together". However, the Ballions were not involved in the local community and Siouxsie, aware that her family's house differed from the neighbours', would later state that "the suburbs inspired intense hatred."

At the age of nine, she and a friend were sexually assaulted by a neighbour. The assault was reported to the police but the incident was quickly swept under the carpet by her family, and was not spoken of again. The incident and the way it was treated led Siouxsie to distrust adults. Years later, she stated:

I grew up having no faith in adults as responsible people. And being the youngest in the family I was isolated – I had no one to confide in. So I invented my own world, my own reality. It was my own way of defending myself – protecting myself from the outside world. The only way I could deal with how to survive was to get some strong armour.

Her father died of alcoholism-related illness when Siouxsie was 14 years old, resulting in a decline in her health. Siouxsie lost a great deal of weight and failed to attend school. After several misdiagnoses, she was operated on and survived a bout of ulcerative colitis. During the weeks of recovery in mid-1972, she watched television in the hospital and saw David Bowie on Top of the Pops.

At 17, she left school. During this period she began visiting the local gay discos frequented by her sister's friends. She later introduced her own friends to that scene. In November 1975, the Sex Pistols performed at the local art college in Chislehurst. Siouxsie did not attend, but one of her friends told her they sounded like the Stooges, and that singer Johnny Rotten had threatened students attending the gig. In February 1976, Siouxsie and her friend Steven Severin went to see the Sex Pistols play in London. After chatting with members of the band, Siouxsie and Severin decided to follow them regularly. In the following months, journalist Caroline Coon coined the term "Bromley Contingent" to describe this group of eccentric teenagers devoted to the Sex Pistols.

Siouxsie became well known in the London club scene for her glam, fetish- and bondage-inspired attire, which later became part of punk fashion. She would also heavily influence the later development of gothic fashion with her signature cat-eye makeup, deep red lipstick, spiky dyed-black hair, and black clothing. In early September 1976, the Bromley Contingent followed the Sex Pistols to France, where Siouxsie was beaten up for wearing a cupless bra and a black armband with a swastika on it. She claimed her intent was to shock the older generation, not to make a political statement. She later wrote the song "Metal Postcard (Mittageisen)" (in memory of the anti-Nazi artist John Heartfield).

Following the DIY ethos and the idea that the people in the audience could be the people on stage, Siouxsie and Severin decided to form a band. When a support slot at the 100 Club Punk Festival (organised by Malcolm McLaren) opened up, they decided to make an attempt at performing, although at that time they did not know how to play any songs. On 20 September 1976, the band improvised 20 minutes of music while Siouxsie sang the "Lord's Prayer".

For critic Jon Savage, Siouxsie was "unlike any female singer before or since, commanding yet aloof, entirely modern". Viv Albertine from the Slits said:

Siouxsie just appeared fully made, fully in control, utterly confident. It totally blew me away. There she was doing something that I dared to dream but she took it and did it and it wiped the rest of the festival for me, that was it. I can't even remember everything else about it except that one performance.

One of Siouxsie's first public appearances was with the Sex Pistols on Bill Grundy's television show, on Thames Television in December 1976. Standing next to the band, Siouxsie made fun of the presenter when he asked her how she was doing. She responded: "I've always wanted to meet you, Bill." Grundy, who later claimed he was drunk, suggested a meeting after the show, which provoked guitarist Steve Jones to respond with a series of expletives inappropriate for prime-time television. This episode created a media furore on the front covers of several tabloids, including the Daily Mirror, which published the headline "Siouxsie's a Punk Shocker". The event had a major impact on the Sex Pistols' subsequent career, and they became a household name overnight.

Aware of the press surrounding both herself and the Sex Pistols, Siouxsie began to distance herself from the scene and stopped seeing the Sex Pistols after the 15 December 1976 gig at Notre Dame Hall. From then, she focused her energy on her own band, Siouxsie and the Banshees.

=== Siouxsie and the Banshees, and the Creatures (1977–2003) ===
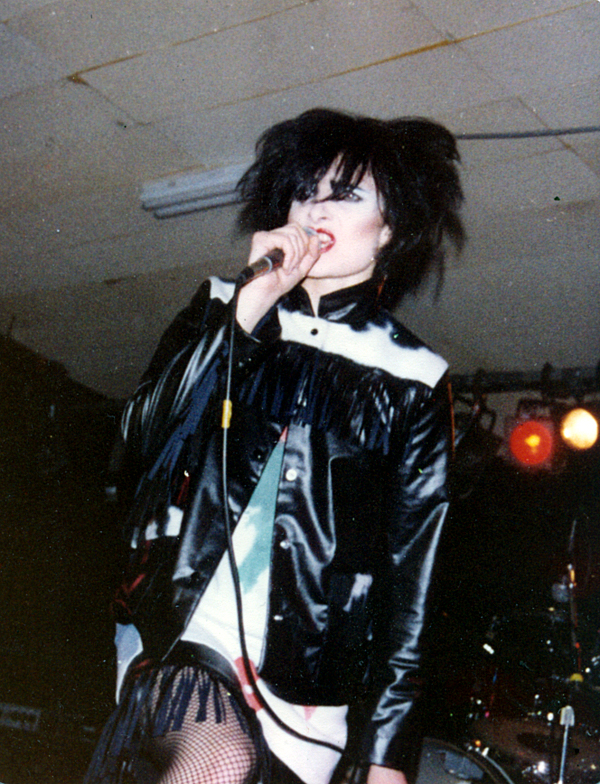
Siouxsie Sioux in November 1980 in New York

In 1977, Siouxsie and the Banshees toured the UK, with Severin on bass, Kenny Morris on drums and John McKay on guitar. One year later, their first single, "Hong Kong Garden" reached number 7 in the UK Singles Chart. With its oriental-inflected xylophone motif, Melody Maker deemed it "a glorious debut [...] All the elements come together with remarkable effect. The song is strident and powerful with tantalising oriental guitar riffs plus words and vocals that are the result of anger, disdain and isolation. No-one will be singled out because everyone is part and parcel of the whole. It might even be a hit".

Their debut album, The Scream (1978), was one of the first post-punk records released. It received 5-star reviews in Sounds and Record Mirror. The latter said that the record "points to the future, real music for the new age". The music was different from the single; it was angular, dark and jagged. The Scream was retrospectively praised by Don Watson in NME as one of the best debut albums of all time. Join Hands followed in 1979, with war as the lyrical theme.

The 1980 album Kaleidoscope marked the arrival of John McGeoch, considered "one of the most innovative and influential guitarists" by The Guardian, and drummer Budgie. The hit single "Happy House" was qualified as "great Pop" with "liquid guitar" and other songs like "Red Light" were layered with electronic sounds. Kaleidoscope widened Siouxsie's audience, reaching the top 5 in the UK Albums Chart. Juju followed in 1981, reaching number 7; the singles "Spellbound" and "Arabian Knights" were described as "pop marvels" by The Guardian. During recording sessions for Juju, Siouxsie and Budgie formed a second band the Creatures, a duo characterized by a stripped-down sound focused on vocals and drums; their first record, the EP Wild Things, was a commercial success. Record Mirror reviewed it as an "astonishingly successful exercise. Several Siouxsie voices over Budgie's quite magnificent drums and percussion make up the entire fabric but it never sounds sparse... A surprise and a triumph."

In 1982, the Siouxsie and the Banshees' album A Kiss in the Dreamhouse was widely acclaimed by critics. Richard Cook of NME depicted it as "a feat of imagination scarcely ever recorded". The single "Slowdive" was "a violin-colored dance beat number". They included strings for the first time on several songs. The recording sessions took their toll, and McGeoch was forced to quit the band.

In 1983, Siouxsie went to Hawaii to record the Creatures' first album, Feast, which included the hit single "Miss the Girl". It was her first incursion into exotica, incorporating sounds of waves, local Hawaiian choirs and local percussion. Later that year, Siouxsie and Budgie released "Right Now", a song from Mel Tormé's repertoire that the Creatures re-orchestrated with brass arrangements; "Right Now" soon became a top 20 hit single in the UK. Then, with the Banshees (including guitarist Robert Smith of the Cure), she covered the Beatles' "Dear Prudence", which reached number 3 on the UK Singles Chart. Two albums followed with Smith: Nocturne, recorded live in London in 1983, and 1984's Hyæna. In 1985, the single "Cities in Dust" was recorded with sequencers; it climbed to number 21 in the UK charts. Entertainment Weekly noted that it was the first of a handful of Alternative rock radio hits in the US. 1986's Tinderbox and the 1987 covers album Through the Looking Glass both reached the top 15 in the UK.

In 1988, the single "Peek-a-Boo" marked a musical departure from her previous work, anticipating hip-hop-inspired rock with the use of samples. NME called it an "oriental marching band hip hop with farting horns and catchy accordion" and Melody Maker "a brightly unexpected mixture of black steel and pop disturbance". The multifaceted album, Peepshow, received a five star review in Q magazine. The ballad "The Last Beat of My Heart" issued as a single, saw her using accordion and strings.

Siouxsie then went to Andalusia in Spain to record the second Creatures album, Boomerang (1989). The album integrated flamenco, jazz and blues with brass arrangements. The first single was "Standing There". NME called Boomerang "a rich and unsettling landscape of exotica". Anton Corbijn visited the group during the recording near Jerez de la Frontera, and Siouxsie convinced him to take photographs in colour, unlike his prior work which was in black-and-white: the photos used for the promotion showed Siouxsie and Budgie in fields surrounded with sunflowers. In 1990, she toured for the first time with the Creatures, in Europe and North America.

On 1991's dance-oriented "Kiss Them for Me" single, Siouxsie and the Banshees used South Asian instrumentation; twenty year old Indian tabla player Talvin Singh (who was later Björk's percussionist on her 1993 Debut album) took part in the session and provided vocals for the bridge. With "Kiss Them for Me", the Banshees scored a hit on the US Billboard Hot 100 peaking at number 23. After the release of Superstition which received enthusiastic reviews, the group co-headlined the first Lollapalooza tour.

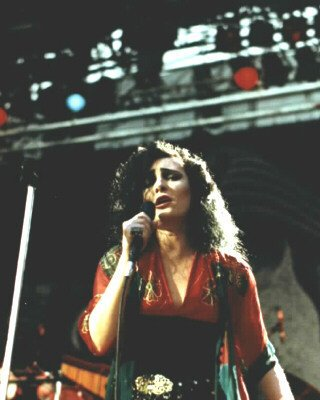
Siouxsie at the first Lollapalooza in Irvine, California, 1991

In 1992, film director Tim Burton requested that she write a song for Batman Returns, and the Banshees composed the single "Face to Face".

In the mid-1990s, Siouxsie started to do one-off collaborations with other artists. Suede invited her to a benefit concert for the Red Hot Organization. With guitarist Bernard Butler, she performed a version of Lou Reed's "Caroline Says". Spin reviewed it as "haughty and stately". Morrissey, ex-lead singer of the Smiths, recorded a duet with Siouxsie in 1994: they both sang on the single "Interlude", a track that was initially performed by Timi Yuro, a female torch singer of the 1960s. "Interlude" was released under the banner "Morrissey and Siouxsie".

The last Banshees studio album, The Rapture, was released in 1995; it was written partly near Toulouse, France where she had recently moved. After the accompanying tour, the Banshees announced their split during a press conference called "20 Minutes into 20 Years". The Creatures became her only band. At the same time, she released the song "The Lighthouse" on French producer Hector Zazou's album Chansons des mers froides (which translates to Songs from the Cold Seas), with jazz trumpetist Mark Isham. Siouxsie and Zazou adapted the poem "Flannan Isle" by English poet Wilfrid Wilson Gibson.

In February 1998 former Velvet Underground member John Cale invited her to a festival called "With a Little Help From My Friends" at the Paradiso in Amsterdam. The concert was shown on Dutch national television and featured an unreleased Creatures composition, "Murdering Mouth", sung as a duet with Cale. The two toured the US from June until August, performing "Murdering Mouth", and Cale's "Gun" together as the encores of a Creatures and Cale double bill.

The following year, Siouxsie and Budgie released Anima Animus, the first Creatures album since the split of the Banshees. It included the singles "2nd Floor", "Say" and "Prettiest Thing". The material had an urban sound, blending art rock and electronica. Anima Animus was described by The Times as "hypnotic and inventive". Also in 1999, Siouxsie collaborated with Marc Almond on the track "Threat of Love".

In 2002, she did a short reunion tour with the Banshees titled The Seven Year Itch. That same year, Universal released The Best of Siouxsie and the Banshees as the first reissue of her back catalogue.

In 2003, Siouxsie and Budgie released the last Creatures album, Hái!, which was in part recorded in Japan, collaborating with taiko player Leonard Eto (previously of the Kodo Drummers). Peter Wratts wrote in Time Out: "Her voice is the dominant instrument here, snaking and curling around the bouncing drumming backdrop, elegiac and inhuman as she chants, purrs and whispers her way around the album". He called the record a "spine-tingling achievement". Hái! was preceded by the single "Godzilla!". That year, Siouxsie was featured on the track "Cish Cash" by Basement Jaxx, from their album Kish Kash, which won Best Electronic/Dance Album at the Grammy Awards.

=== Solo (2004–present) ===
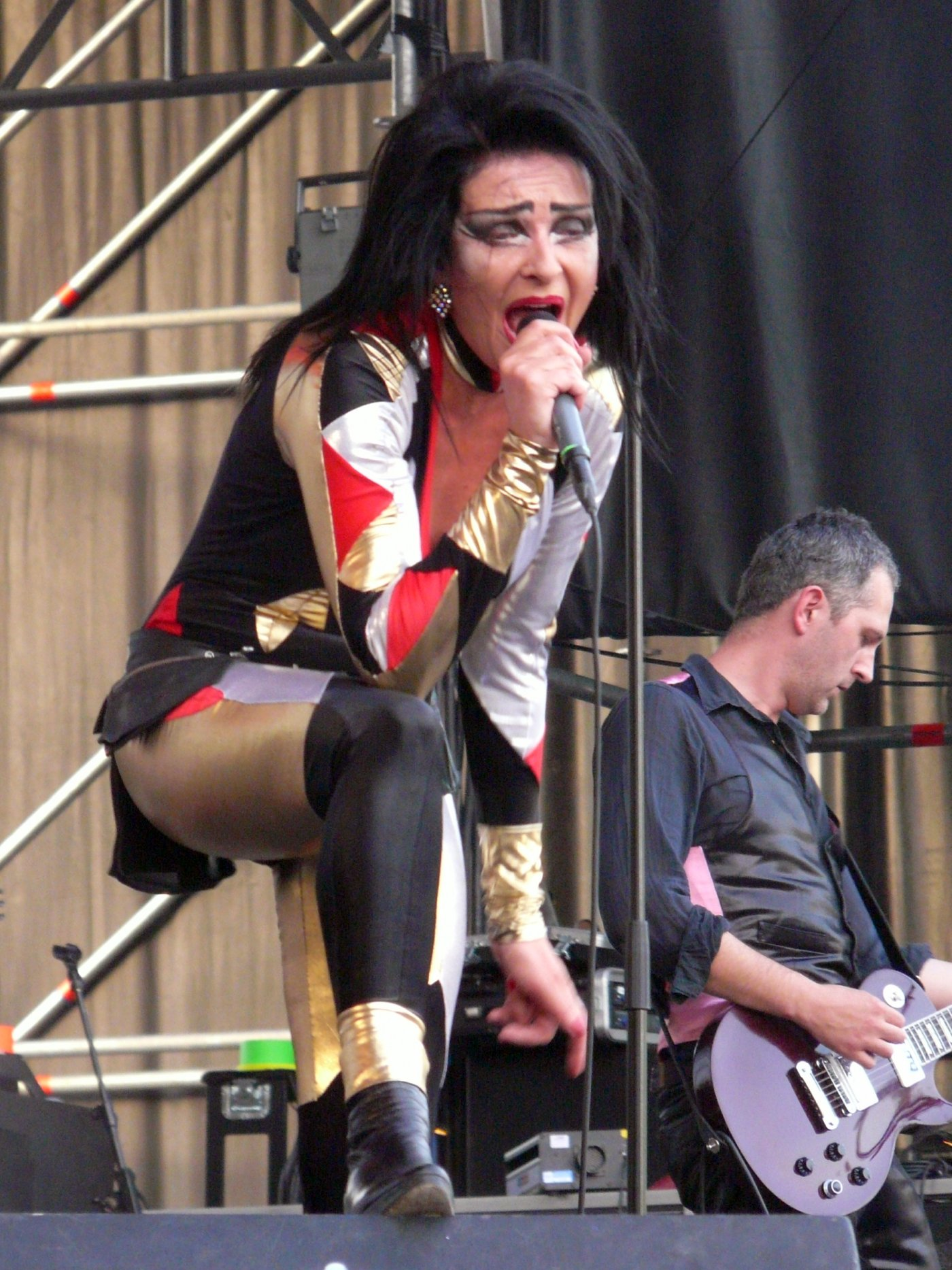
Siouxsie at the Saturday Night Fiber, Madrid 2008

In 2004 Siouxsie toured for the first time as a solo act, playing Banshees and Creatures songs. A live DVD called Dreamshow was recorded at the last London concert, in which she and her musicians were accompanied by a 16-piece orchestra, the Millennia Ensemble. Released in August 2005, Deamshow reached number 1 in the UK music DVD chart.

Her debut solo album, Mantaray, was released in September 2007. Pitchfork wrote, "She really is pop", before finishing the review by declaring, "It's a success". Mojo stated: "a thirst for sonic adventure radiates from each track". Mantaray included three singles: "Into a Swan", "Here Comes That Day" and "About to Happen". In 2008, Siouxsie recorded vocals for the track "Careless Love" on The Edge of Love soundtrack by composer Angelo Badalamenti. She performed it with another Badalamenti number, "Who Will Take My Dreams Away", at the annual edition of the World Soundtrack Awards. After a year of touring, the singer played the last show of her tour in London in September 2008. A live DVD of this performance, Finale: The Last Mantaray & More Show, was released in 2009.

In June 2013, after a hiatus of five years, Siouxsie played two nights at the Royal Festival Hall in London during Yoko Ono's Meltdown festival. She performed 1980's Kaleidoscope album live in its entirety, along with other works from her back catalogue, and her performance was praised by the press. She also appeared at Ono's Double Fantasy concert, to sing the final song, "Walking on Thin Ice". In October 2014, she and fellow Banshee Steven Severin compiled a CD titled It's a Wonderfull Life for the November 2014 issue of Mojo magazine, in which she appeared on the cover. The disc included 15 tracks that inspired the Banshees.

"Love Crime", her first song in eight years, was featured in the finale of the TV series Hannibal in August 2015. Series creator Bryan Fuller called it "epic".

In 2022, Mantaray was remastered at Abbey Road Studios to mark its 15th anniversary. Mantaray, featuring a different artwork, was reissued on black vinyl, and CD. Siouxsie returned to the stage in 2023 with a series of live dates. She headlined the Cruel World Festival in Pasadena, California in May, and the Release Athens 2023 festival in June. Her performance in Madrid at the Noches del Botánico was praised by Time Out.

In 2024, she collaborated with Iggy Pop for a duet which was a new rendition of "The Passenger" recorded for an advert.

In November 2026, Siouxsie appears on the front cover of the monthly magazine, Uncut. She gave her first long interview in a decade for the release of Downside Up, a box set collecting all the B-sides recorded by the Banshees between 1978 and 1995, available on vinyl for the first time in a 5LP edition, and also repressed on CD.

== Songwriting ==
Journalist Paul Morley noted that Siouxsie's songs topics dealt with "mental illness, medical terrors, surreal diseases, depraved urges, sinister intensity, unearthly energy, sexual abuse, childhood disturbances, sordid mysteries, unbearable nervous anxiety, fairytale fears, urban discontent and the bleak dignity of solitude". Many of her songs are about damage; her childhood marked her profoundly. She said, "Damaged lives, damaged souls, damaged relationships. Most of the damage I sing about first happened when I was younger and I am still feeding off it and working it out. Early experiences are what create a lifetime of damage. The songs you write can help you fix the damage. And just the environment you are in is so important and can waste potential and corrupt something. For me, there was neglect. An alcoholic father who is not there because the most important thing for him is just to get alcohol and your mother is trying to compensate for the non-existent second parent so she's never there because she's working all the time and when she is around she's stressed out. Being isolated and not having anyone to connect with, there was just no physical touching back then".

== Legacy ==
Her voice is, in its own right, the common thread through all of it. There is no one who sings like that. And I think there are a lot of people who were influenced by it, but even if you try and sing like her, you can't do that. You can't throw your voice like that. You can't throw harmony like that. That is a very distinct voice. Her technique is a thread between the really far-out stuff and opera and pop music. It's distinct. It's all her own.

— Dave Sitek of TV on the Radio

Siouxsie has influenced artists of many genres. She had a strong impact on two trip-hop acts. Tricky covered 1983's proto trip-hop "Tattoo", to open his second album Nearly God, and Massive Attack sampled "Metal Postcard (Mittageisen)" on their song "Superpredators (Metal Postcard)" for the soundtrack to the film The Jackal.

Other acts have covered Siouxsie's songs. Jeff Buckley performed "Killing Time" several times; he first recorded it during a radio session for WFMU in 1992. LCD Soundsystem recorded a cover of "Slowdive" for the B-side of "Disco Infiltrator", which was also released on Introns. Santigold based her track "My Superman" on the music of "Red Light". In 2003, the Beta Band sampled "Painted Bird" on a track titled "Liquid Bird" on their Heroes to Zeros album. Red Hot Chili Peppers performed "Christine" at the V2001 festival and introduced it to their British audience as "your national anthem". "Christine" was also revisited by Simple Minds. Indie folk group DeVotchKa covered "The Last Beat of My Heart" at the suggestion of Arcade Fire singer Win Butler in 2007. The Weeknd sampled "Happy House" on the 2011 song "House of Balloons", which he later performed at the 2021 Super Bowl LV halftime show.

Morrissey said that "Siouxsie and the Banshees were excellent. They were one of the great groups of the late 70s, early 80s". In 1994, discussing modern bands, he also stated: "None of them are as good as Siouxsie and the Banshees at full pelt. That's not dusty nostalgia, that's fact". Another member of the Smiths, Johnny Marr, stated : "Siouxsie is one of the best singers ever to come out of this country". Marr also declared: "Really my generation was all about a guy called John McGeoch, from Siouxsie and the Banshees. He was a great player". Marr praised McGeoch for his work on Siouxsie's single "Spellbound". Marr qualified it as "clever" with "really good picky thing going on which is very un-rock'n'roll". Radiohead also cited McGeoch-era Siouxsie records when mentioning the recording of "There There". Their singer, Thom Yorke, said: "The band that really changed my life was R.E.M. and Siouxsie and the Banshees ...". "My favourite show I ever saw then was Siouxsie and she was absolutely amazing. ... She's totally in command of the whole audience". Yorke added that she "made an especially big impression in concert, she was really sexy but absolutely terrifying." Sonic Youth singer and guitarist Thurston Moore named "Hong Kong Garden" as one of his 25 all-time favourite songs, and declared: "she possesses one of the great voices of our generation".

Siouxsie has been named as an influence by other bands ranging from contemporaries Joy Division, U2, and the Cure, to later acts like the Jesus and Mary Chain. and TV on the Radio. Joy Division co-founder Peter Hook said that The Scream inspired them for the "really unusual way of playing" of the guitarist and the drummer and cited the Banshees as "one of our big influences". U2 frontman Bono named her as an influence in the band's 2006 autobiography U2 by U2. He was inspired by her way of singing. "I still think that I sing like Siouxsie from The Banshees on the first two U2 albums". With his band, he selected "Christine" for a compilation made for Mojo's readers. U2 guitarist the Edge also was the presenter of an award given to Siouxsie at a Mojo ceremony in 2005. The Cure's Robert Smith related what the Join Hands tour brought him musically: "When we supported The Banshees in 1979, we suddenly became aware of how limited our palette was. I felt constrained, so when the opportunity arose to play with them I jumped at it and juggled the two bands for a while. It taught me a lot – they had fantastic rhythm sections and this made me think, 'Why can't I have this?'." For Smith's record The Head on the Door in 1985, he stated: "It reminds me of the Kaleidoscope album, the idea of having lots of different sounding things, different colours". Dave Sitek of TV on the Radio hailed the poppiest Siouxsie songs, citing their arrangements: "I've always tried to make a song that begins like "Kiss Them for Me". I think songs like "I Was a Lover" or "Wash the Day Away" came from that element of surprise mode where all of a sudden this giant drum comes in and you're like, what the fuck?! That record was the first one where I was like, okay, even my friends're going to fall for this. I feel like that transition into that record was a relief for me. Really beautiful music was always considered too weird by the normal kids and that was the first example where I thought, we've got them, they're hooked! I watched people dance to that song, people who had never heard of any of the music that I listened to, they heard that music in a club and went crazy". Dave Gahan of Depeche Mode said about her: "She always sounds exciting. She sings with a lot of sex–that's what I like". Mark Lanegan stated that he would have liked to collaborate with her: "In my wildest dreams I would love to sing with Siouxsie". She is also revered by Damon Albarn and Dave Grohl. Omar Rodríguez-López of the Mars Volta mentioned his liking for "the very textural side of Siouxsie". Santigold said, "I keep a Rolodex of the women that vocally inspire me. There aren't that many, but she's definitely one of them. I remember one of the first times I heard 'Red Light' it was at a party, and I remember going up to the DJ and being like, 'Who's this?'. It was that good. I kind of stopped and was like ... wow. There's not a tremendous amount of women who are bold and forward thinking as artists. I feel like her music, at the time especially, was pretty unique in the way that it sort of matched her style. The freedom of experimenting with this dark place that doesn't have a place often in modern music".

Siouxsie has inspired many female singers. When asked if there was any figure who connected with her when she was just a listener, PJ Harvey replied: "It's hard to beat Siouxsie Sioux, in terms of live performance. She is so exciting to watch, so full of energy and human raw quality". Harvey also selected in her top 10 favourite albums of 1999, the Anima Animus album by Siouxsie's second band the Creatures. Sinéad O'Connor said that when she started, Siouxsie was one of her main influences. Tracey Thorn of Everything but the Girl wrote in her autobiography that Siouxsie was one of her heroines. Thorn paid homage to Siouxsie in the lyrics of her 2007 song "Hands Up to the Ceiling". Elizabeth Fraser of Cocteau Twins used to have a Siouxsie tattoo on her arm, and mentioned her liking for "Metal Postcard" to the members of Massive Attack in 1998. Sharleen Spiteri of Texas grew up listening to tracks such as "Hong Kong Garden" and was hooked by the Asian vibe present in the song; she stated that Texas' single "In Our Lifetime" was "our tribute to Hong Kong Garden". Garbage singer Shirley Manson cited her as an influence: "I learned how to sing listening to The Scream and Kaleidoscope". Manson also declared that Siouxsie embodied everything she wanted to be as a young woman. Manson would later write the foreword to Siouxsie & The Banshees: The Authorised Biography. Beth Ditto, of Gossip cited her as one of their influences for their 2009 album Music for Men. Ana Matronic of Scissor Sisters named Siouxsie as a source of inspiration and the Banshees as her favourite band. Siouxsie was also hailed by Romy Madley Croft of the xx, Kim Deal of the Pixies and the Breeders, and also by Josephine Wiggs of the Breeders, and namechecked by Karin Dreijer Andersson of the Knife. Kate Jackson of the Long Blondes said that Siouxsie was a part of her musical background, thanks to her "sharp lyrics" on Creatures' tracks like "So Unreal". Rachel Goswell mentioned her as a major influence: "From a singing point of view, I was inspired by Siouxsie Sioux, who I just adored. She's amazing. I've never seen anyone else quite like her"; her band Slowdive was named on a suggestion of Goswell, inspired by the Banshees' single of the same name. Lush were initially named "the Baby Machines", which the band culled from the lyrics of "Arabian Knights". Courtney Love of Hole wrote Siouxsie in her favourite records' list when she was a teenager in her diary. While talking about another band, Love also stated: "They are amazing. ... It's kind of very Siouxsie Sioux". Kim Gordon of Sonic Youth said: "Initially I was really inspired by ... Siouxsie, Patti Smith". FKA twigs named her as a main influence: "Every bit of music that I made sounded like a pastiche of Siouxsie ... but through that I discovered myself". Róisín Murphy named Siouxsie when asked who were her biggest influences.

Other musicians who have stated their admiration for Siouxsie's work include Charli XCX, Hayley Williams of Paramore, Dolores O'Riordan of the Cranberries, Jennifer Charles of Elysian Fields, Ebony Bones, Grimes, Toni Halliday of Curve, Kathleen Hanna of Bikini Kill, Cat Power, Gillian Gilbert of New Order, Amy Ray of the Indigo Girls, Alison Goldfrapp, Sarah Cracknell of Saint Etienne, Florence Welch of Florence + the Machine, Chelsea Wolfe, Brody Dalle of the Distillers, Kristin Kontrol of the Dum Dum Girls, Kim Wilde, Joan As Police Woman, Girlpool, Liz Phair, Billie Ray Martin, An Pierlé, Uffie, Lauren Mayberry of Chvrches, Meshell Ndegeocello, St. Vincent, Anohni, Jehnny Beth of Savages, Jenny Lee Lindberg of Warpaint, Bananarama, Sharon Van Etten, Olivia Rodrigo, and Nabihah Iqbal.

In 2022, Sky Arts ranked her at number 14 in Britain's top 50 most influential artists of the last 50 years. In 2023, The Times called her "one of British pop's most charismatic and original artists".

== Personal life ==
Siouxsie married bandmate Budgie in May 1991. The following year, they moved to the southwest of France.

In an interview with The Sunday Times in August 2007, she announced that she and Budgie had divorced. In an interview with The Independent, she said:

I've never particularly said I'm hetero or I'm a lesbian. I know there are people who are definitely one way, but not really me. I suppose if I am attracted to men then they usually have more feminine qualities.

In 2015, she left Condom, Gers in France and she moved back to London. In 2023, she teamed up with PETA to protest against animal testing. In a letter to Japanese conglomerate Ajinomoto, she urged the company to stop testing on animals, which she characterized as uncompassionate and based on "bad science".

== Awards and nominations ==
Award	Year	Nominee(s)	Category	Result	Ref.
Ivor Novello Awards	2012	Herself	The Ivors Inspiration Award	Won	
MTV Video Music Awards	1989	"Peek-a-Boo"	Best Post-Modern Video	Nominated	
NME Awards	1980	Herself	Best Female Singer	Won	
NME Awards	1981	Herself	Best Female Singer	Won	
NME Awards	1982	Herself	Best Female Singer	Won	

== Discography ==
=== Studio albums ===
Year	Album details	Peak chart positions	
Year	Album details	UK	FRA
2007	Mantaray: Release date: 10 September 2007; Label: Universal Records	39	132

=== Solo singles ===
Year	Single	Peak positions	Album
Year	Single	UK	Album
2007	"Into a Swan"	59	Mantaray
2007	"Here Comes That Day"	93	Mantaray
2008	"About to Happen"	154	Mantaray
2015	"Love Crime"	—	Single only

=== Collaborative singles ===
Year	Single	Artist	Peak positions	Album
Year	Single	Artist	UK	Album
1994	"Interlude"	Morrissey & Siouxsie	25	Non-album single

=== DVD ===
- 2005 Dreamshow No. 1 UK
- 2009 Finale: The Last Mantaray & More Show No. 4 UK

=== Collaborations with other artists ===
==== In studio ====
- Morrissey: "Interlude" (single recorded in duet) (1994)
- Hector Zazou: "The Lighthouse" (song recorded as guest on the Chansons des mers froides/Songs from the Cold Seas album) (1995)
- Marc Almond: "Threat of Love" (song recorded in duet for the Open All Night album) (1999)
- Basement Jaxx: "Cish Cash" (song recorded as guest on the Kish Kash album) (2003)
- Angelo Badalamenti: "Careless Love" (song recorded as guest for The Edge of Love film soundtrack) (2008)

==== Live ====
- Suede: "Caroline Says" (written by Lou Reed, performed on 30 July 1993 at a Red Hot & AIDS Benefit concert)
- John Cale: "Murdering Mouth" (a Siouxsie song; performed live as a duet in 1998 during The Creatures/John Cale's US double bill, No How Tour)
- Yoko Ono: "Walking on Thin Ice" (duet performed on 23 June 2013 in London)
