= Journalists for Democracy in Sri Lanka =

Journalists for Democracy in Sri Lanka (JDS; Sinhala: ශ්‍රී ලංකාවේ ප්‍රජාතන්ත්‍රවාදය සඳහා වන මාධ්‍යවේදීන්ගේ සංවිධානය, romanized: śrī laṁkāvē prajātantravādaya san̆dahā vana mādhyavēdīngē saṁvidhānaya) is a group of journalists, human rights workers and other activists exiled from Sri Lanka based in Germany. It has reports on human rights and press freedom violations in Sri Lanka and provided videos of war crimes in Sri Lanka. When the United Nations Human Rights Council investigated war crimes in Sri Lanka in 2013, the Sri Lanka Broadcasting Corporation began censoring Tamil-language BBC broadcasts. JDS spoke out assertively against the government's move.
