= Oliver Bengough =

British entrepreneur and media mogul (born 1975)

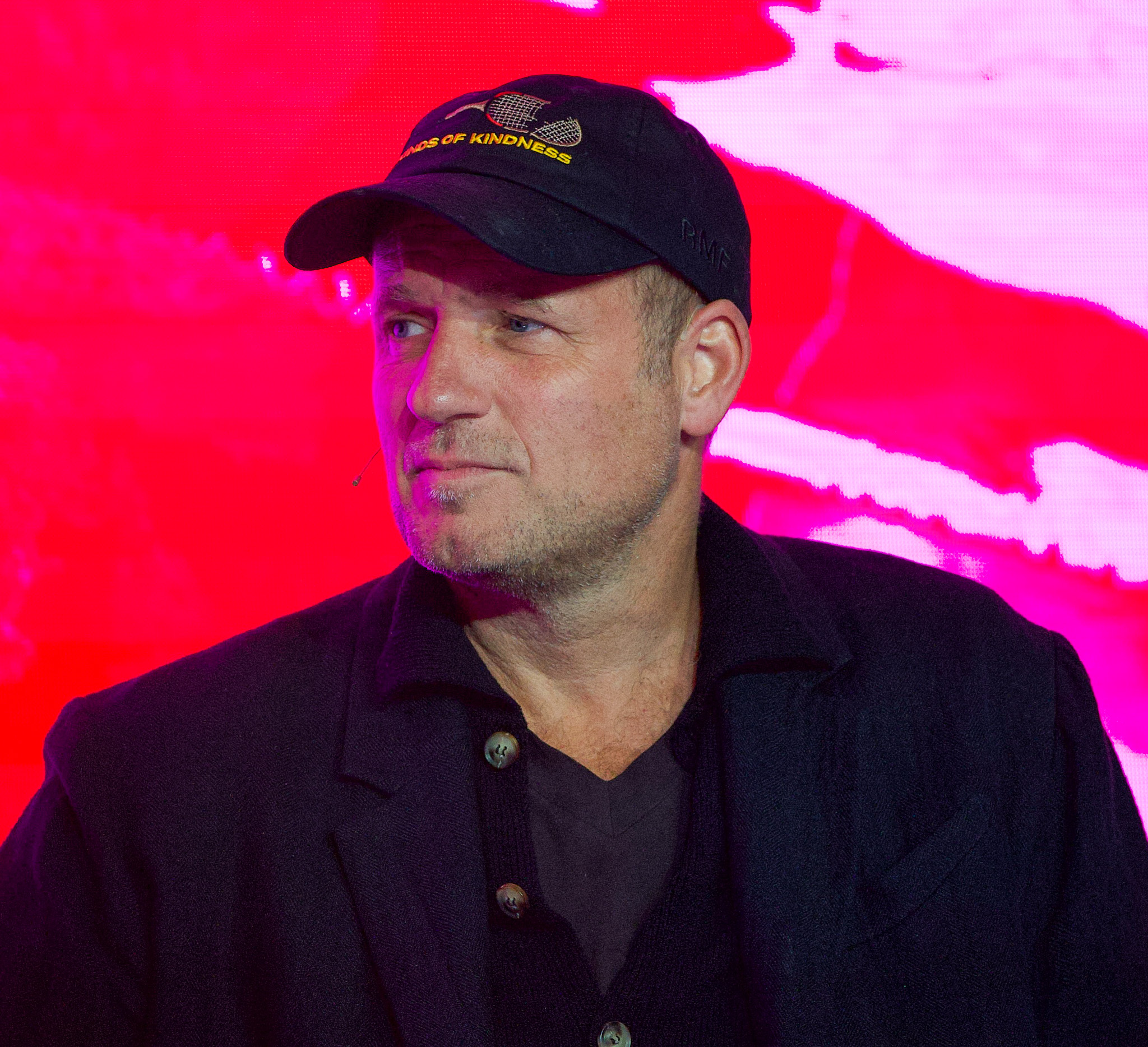
- Occupation: Entrepreneur

Oliver (Olly) Bengough (born February 1975) is a British entrepreneur and media mogul. He is best known for his transformation of the KOKO music venue in London, and as the founder of the broadcasting channel Cinémoi.

== Career ==
Bengough opened his first bar “Lunasa” in 2000 at the age of 23. A year later, in 2001, Bengough founded the Mint Group, under which he would go on to launch five other venues across London.

In 2003, Bengough collaborated with Groove Armada to expand the Lovebox Music Festival from a small monthly club night, to a festival handling over 50,000 people per weekend.

=== The House of KOKO ===
In 2022, Bengough opened The House of KOKO, following a three-year, £70-million overhaul of KOKO's backstage area.

The House of KOKO named by Tatler magazine 'London’s most thrilling new members’ club, is a private members club in Camden Town, London.

=== KOKO ===
In 2004, Bengough was introduced to a former theatre named Camden Palace that was at the time run down. Bengough embarked on a multimillion-pound restoration process of the venue, which took more than six months to complete. The restoration process included all new technical facilities, enabling the scope of operations to be broadened to include live concert performances, club nights, corporate events and television production. Reopened under the new name of KOKO, the club has hosted a number of high-profile events since and is a popular venue in London. The venue was closed in March 2019 for a major refurbishment. It was due to reopen in spring 2020, but a fire in January of that year caused damage to the roof of the building, pushing back plans to reopen it.

=== Cinémoi ===
In 2009, Bengough founded Cinémoi, a global television network focusing on film, fashion and international style. Cinémoi launched a North American version on DirecTV in 2012, broadcasting to over 20 million households.
