= Mantaray (album) =

Studio album by Siouxsie
- Released: 10 September 2007
- Recorded: 2006–2007
- Studios: Riverside Studio and Stone Room, Bath, Somerset, UK
- Genres: Alternative rock; pop
- Length: 41:00
- Labels: W14 Music/Universal; Decca (US)
- Producers: Steve Evans; Charlie Jones

Siouxsie chronology
Hái! The Creatures (2003)	Mantaray (2007)

2023 re-release cover

Singles from Mantaray
- 1. "Into a Swan" Released: 3 September 2007; 2. "Here Comes That Day" Released: 29 October 2007; 3. "About to Happen" Released: 10 March 2008

Mantaray is the debut solo album by English singer Siouxsie. It was released on 10 September 2007 by W14 Music on Universal. After her first solo tour in 2004, Siouxsie wanted to collaborate with other musicians. She met Steve Evans and Charlie Jones, both of them arranged the songs and produced the record. Upon release, Mantaray was well received by critics, with praise focused on Siouxsie's voice and the different compositional styles.

In July 2023, a remastered version of Mantaray was reissued on black vinyl, and CD.

== Background ==
After the success of her first solo release, the live DVD Dreamshow, which reached the No. 1 position in the UK chart in August 2005, Siouxsie received instrumental demos from several composers. "Loveless" was the first one she got from Kookie, followed by "Into a Swan". Universal soon offered her a new record deal on the label W14, which was about to be created by John Williams - he had already previously worked with her for Peepshow and Boomerang. Commenting on the news on her website in July 2006, Siouxsie stated, "At least I didn't have to get someone spray-painting my name on the front of the Universal building"! It was a reference to a famous episode which took place in early 1978 in London when record companies had been tagged one morning with the command, "Sign the Banshees, do it now".

== Recording and music ==
Mantaray was co-produced by Steve Evans (who had previously worked with Robert Plant) and Charlie Jones (who had collaborated with Plant as well as with Goldfrapp). The drums were performed by Clive Deamer, who had previously played with both Plant, and Portishead. Evans and Jones together composed the music for the tracks "About to Happen", "If It Doesn't Kill You", "Sea of Tranquility", "They Follow You" and "Heaven and Alchemy". Siouxsie worked in a different environment with a touch of fear as she didn't know what to expect.

It was the first time that she worked with producers who also physically played on the record, which made a "huge difference". Instead of recording the album in one block session, she commuted from France to Bath in England where was located the producers' studio. She made several trips from the end of 2006 to May 2007, concentrating on two or three tracks at the time. This working method provided a useful overview, as she stated: "Sometimes when you're so involved in a project day in day out, you can lose sight of the goal or the object. It puts a different discipline to it". She used technology as a tool, listening to the recording process of the music from home. Siouxsie's only instruction to her two composers was "to treat every song as a potential single".

Mantaray includes a variety of musical styles. She said: "it has probably got the Siouxsie from seven years old to now, a life painting of where I started and where I am up to now". "If it Doesn't Kill You" was one of the oldest lyrics she wrote, and the original music was different before she first met Jones. He was drawn to the title and in Siouxsie's words, "he made it one of those classic songs that could be associated with James Bond. It's quite cinematic." "Sea of Tranquility" existed as a lyric on its own and was her idea of writing a sci-fi murder mystery. Jones and Evans "took it somewhere with that whole bossa nova thing" and the title of the album comes from a line of it. A manta ray is described as "a ghost of a roar from the sea floor" in that song. In an interview for The Telegraph, she further explained: "Because the sounds on the album are so diverse, we needed an abstract title. Rays symbolise something from deep space and a long, long time ago." "The deep ocean also inspired [1964 TV series] Stingray and science fiction. Which takes us on to space - those wings. Deep ocean and space are almost reversible worlds."

The songs were written in collaboration with several musicians. However "One Mile Below" was composed solely by Siouxsie, for the first time since the 1995 song "New Skin".

== Release and promotion ==
Mantaray was released in the UK on 10 September 2007 on W14 Music, a Universal sublabel. A U.S. release followed on 2 October on Decca Records. In addition to the standard jewel case and a tri-fold Digipak, Mantaray was also released on vinyl in both countries. The album was preceded by its first single, "Into a Swan", released one week earlier on 3 September. Upon release, Mantaray hit No. 39 in the UK Albums Chart.

"Here Comes That Day" was released as second single on 29 October and was followed by the album's third and last single, "About to Happen", on 10 March 2008. Mantaray was supported by a year long world tour and TV appearances. The last show of the tour was filmed and released on the Finale: The Last Mantaray & More Show DVD in 2009.

In 2022, Mantaray was remastered at Abbey Road Studios to mark its 15th anniversary. The remastered version featuring different artwork, was released on streaming and download platforms in December. A reissue on black vinyl and CD was out in July 2023.

== Critical reception ==
Professional ratings
Review scores
Source	Rating
AllMusic	3.5/5 stars
bbc.co.uk	favourable
The Guardian	3/5 stars
Metro	4/5 stars
Q	3/5 stars
Pitchfork	7.3/10
Slant Magazine	4/5 stars
Spin	3.5/5 stars
The Times	4/5 stars
Uncut	3/5 stars

Mantaray received positive reviews from music critics. Nitsuh Abebe of Pitchfork wrote, "She really is pop" before finishing the review with the declaration, "It's a success". Concerning the quality of the songs, journalist Charlotte Heathcote noted, "Impressively, there's not a let-down track on the album and a perfectionist attention to detail sees synths, strings, wind and percussion used to creative, compelling effect". Mojo also praised the songs and the arrangements, saying that "a thirst for sonic adventure radiates from each track". Simon Price in The Independent shared the same point of view, stating that "Mantaray is a bracing and beautiful blast of ice". In a review rated 4 stars out of 5, The Times observed that her "steely-toned voice is as beguiling as ever". Similarly, The Telegraph critic Andrew Perry noted, "She sounds imperious, passionate". Q's Gary Mulholland published a positive review and said, "Siouxsie voice is as rich and sensual as ever, and lyrical references to rebirth abound". Uncut wrote, "Fortunately [...] she's still the uncompromising outsider at heart". In a review rated 4 out of 5 stars, Metro commented that the 10 songs of her first solo album "do add further depth to her repertoire". Slant Magazine qualified Mantaray's sound as "distinctly modern", stating that "it's Siouxsie voice—trembling and echoing all at once—that reaffirms the album's urgency".

=== Retrospective appraisal ===
In 2023, The Times named it a "must-have reissue". Reviewer Dan Cairns praised the music, writing: "its mix of lush, Bernard Herrmann-like strings, Bond-theme melodrama... make a fitting soundbed for that imperious, distinctive voice".

== Track listing ==
Mantaray track listing
No.	Title	Writer(s)	Length
1.	"Into a Swan"	Siouxsie, Kookie^{1}, Brion James	4:13
2.	"About to Happen"	Siouxsie, Noko, Charlie Jones, Steve Evans	2:50
3.	"Here Comes That Day"	Siouxsie, Noko, Kookie, Howard Gray	4:03
4.	"Loveless"	Siouxsie, Kookie, James	4:25
5.	"If It Doesn't Kill You"	Siouxsie, Jones, Evans	4:32
6.	"One Mile Below"	Siouxsie	3:01
7.	"Drone Zone"	Siouxsie, Steve Hilton	3:22
8.	"Sea of Tranquility"	Siouxsie, Jones, Evans	5:13
9.	"They Follow You"	Siouxsie, Jones, Evans, Graham Crabb	5:03
10.	"Heaven and Alchemy"	Siouxsie, Jones, Evans	4:19

== Personnel ==
- Siouxsie Sioux – vocals
- Steve Evans – guitar, programming, ukulele
- Charlie Jones – bass guitar, upright bass, Rhodes piano, synths, piano, autoharp
- Clive Deamer – drums
- Hossam Ramzy – darbuka
- Ken Dewar – percussion
- Noko – guitars, keyboards, programming
- Phil Andrews – guitar, keyboards, programming
- Terry Edwards – saxophone, trumpet, flugelhorn
- Ted Benham – hammered dulcimer, xylophone
- Davide Rossi – strings
- Tom Dalgety – engineer

== Charts ==
2007 chart performance for Mantaray
Chart (2007)	Peak position
French Albums Chart	132
UK Albums Chart	39

2023 chart performance for Mantaray
Chart (2023)	Peak position
Scottish Albums (Official Charts)	10
UK Independent Albums (Official Charts)	5
