= Into a Swan =

Single by Siouxsie

from the album Mantaray
- B-side: "Swansway"; "Into a Swan (Reprise)"
- Released: 3 September 2007
- Recorded: 2007
- Genre: Alternative rock
- Length: 4:13
- Label: W14
- Songwriters: Siouxsie; Kookie (Kim Hoglund); Brion James
- Producers: Steve Evans; Charlie Jones

Siouxsie singles chronology
"Godzilla!" (2003 the Creatures)	"Into a Swan" (2007)	"Here Comes That Day" (2007)

Music video
- "Into a Swan" on YouTube

"Into a Swan" is the debut solo single by Siouxsie for her debut solo album Mantaray. It was released in the UK on W14 on 3 September 2007 and promoted with a video featuring Siouxsie transforming into a black swan.

== Background and music ==
After the Creatures's final album Hái! in 2003, she collaborated with Basement Jaxx on the title track of their album Kish Kash. Soon, she received tapes from other composers: "Into a Swan" was one of the first songs written after the end of her marriage.

The single was Siouxsie's first solo record. Egyptian percussionist Hossam Ramzy who had previously worked with Robert Plant on No Quarter, took part to the recording sessions and played darbuka. The song was seen as a statement of identity and transformation by critics. Siouxsie said it was about "Recognizing that feeling that I suppose gets you from I guess adolescent when you get your first feeling of confidence of stepping out on your own and I think it is just getting that confidence to move forwards and continue". It is a motivation.

== Release, video, promotion and pop culture ==
Aside from the digital download, "Into a Swan" was released as a series of 7-inch vinyl singles as well as CD singles, as well as B-sides as "Swansway" and a reprise version of "Into a Swan". A 12-inch single with remixes by Andrew Weatherall and Mekon were released on 1 October. The music video featuring Siouxsie transforming into a black swan, leaked to the Internet via YouTube in June 2007. It was later available to stream on Siouxsie's official website. Upon release, "Into a Swan" hit number 59 on the UK Singles Chart. In 2008, the song was featured in the opening credits of the film Alien Raiders. In 2026, the song was used in the TV series Lucky.

== Formats and track listings ==
CD single and digital download

1. "Into a Swan"
2. "Swansway"
3. "Into a Swan (Reprise)"

7-inch vinyl 1

1. "Into a Swan"
2. "Swansway"

7-inch vinyl 2

1. "Into a Swan"
2. "Into a Swan (Reprise)"

12-inch single

1. "Into a Swan (Weatherall Remix)"
2. "Into a Swan (Mekon Remix)"
