= JDS (duo) =

British dance music duo

- Genres: breakbeat
- Years active: c. 1997 to c. 2008
- Labels: FFRR, TCR
- Members: Darren Pearce, Julian Napolitano

JDS is a British electronic dance music duo. Mainly active between 1997 and 2008, they are known for their breakbeat productions including club anthem "Nine Ways" and several UK chart hits.

== History ==
Julian Napolitano and Darren Pearce formed the breakbeat duo JDS circa the mid-1990s. Their track "Nine Ways" was a club and Ibiza anthem in 1997, and peaked at number 4 on the UK Dance Chart that same year, with Pearce also contributing the breakbeat remix. In May 1998, the JDS single "London Town" peaked at number 49 on the UK Singles Chart. In the year 2000 Muzik magazine stated their release "Destiny Calls" was one of the "most memorable dancefloor moments of the millennium", and in 2001, a JDS remix of earlier hit "Nine Ways" was released, peaking at number 47 on the UK Singles Chart.

In 2005 the duo released the album The Adventures of the Purple Funky Monkey, a breakbeat record which had elements of several other genres including "hip-hop, funk, electro, house, punk and rock" or, as put by The Independent more circumspectly, the "epitome of the magpie tendency". It received a positive 4* review in DMC World magazine, and other DJs such as Fatboy Slim and Laurent Garnier incorporated tracks in their live sets. They also released the single "Purple Funky Monkey", partly through the goal of bringing humour into the typically "austere" electronic music scene. By 2007, the duo were becoming known as one of the "hottest breakbeat production teams in the world".

== Members ==
- Darren Pearce
- Julian Napolitano

== Discography ==
Singles
Title	Year	Peak UK singles	Peak UK dance	Peak Finland
"Nine Ways"	1997	61	4	
"London Town"	1998	49	10	
"Oriental"	1999			
"Destiny Calls"	2000			
"Nine Ways"	2001	47	2	14
"Punk of Funk"	2003		37	
"Don't Be Alone"/"Blackout"	2004		13	
"Disco Rockers"	2004		33	
"Purple Funky Monkey"	2005			
"Jump Around"/"Detonate"	2005		26	
"You Got Me"	2008		30	

Albums
Title	Year
The Adventures of the Purple Funky Monkey	2005
