= Fire and Skill – The Jam Live =

Fire And Skill – The Jam Live

Live album by The Jam
- Released: 2015
- Recorded: 1977–1982
- Label: Polydor

Fire And Skill – The Jam Live is a six-disc collection of live performances by The Jam, released in 2015, and incorporating six previously unreleased live concerts by the band between 1977 and 1982. The title of the collection refers to a motto inscribed on Paul Weller's guitar amplifier. New Noise magazine described the collection as "massively brilliant (and brilliantly massive)" and notes that the selection of performances demonstrates the development of The Jam "from punks to New Mod devotees". AllMusic's reviewer Stephen Thomas Erlewine gave the collection a 4-star rating, citing as highlights the concerts recorded in Newcastle in October 1980 and at Hammersmith Palais in December 1981.
