= Hong Kong Garden (song) =

Single by Siouxsie and the Banshees
- B-side: "Voices"
- Released: 18 August 1978
- Recorded: 1978
- Studio: Fallout Shelter (London)
- Genre: Post-punk; new wave
- Length: 2:52
- Label: Polydor
- Songwriters: John McKay; Kenny Morris; Siouxsie Sioux; Steven Severin
- Producers: Nils Stevenson; Steve Lillywhite

Siouxsie and the Banshees singles chronology
"Hong Kong Garden" (1978)	"The Staircase (Mystery)" (1979)

Music video
- "Hong Kong Garden" on YouTube

"Hong Kong Garden" is the debut single by the English rock band Siouxsie and the Banshees. It was released as a single on 18 August 1978 by Polydor Records, reaching number 7 on the UK Singles Chart.

The Independent stated that the song was "arguably the most important of the early post-punk hits" and considered the track as one of the "10 best new wave singles" of 1978. In 2005, Q placed it in its list of the "100 Greatest Guitar Tracks Ever".

== Background ==
The first version, titled "People Phobia", was composed by guitarist John McKay in 1977. The band first heard it on a tour bus.

The song was named after the Hong Kong Garden Chinese take-away which stood at 101 High Street in Chislehurst throughout the 1970s and 80s. In a 2009 interview, Siouxsie Sioux was quoted as explaining the lyrics with reference to the racist activities of skinheads visiting the take-away:

I'll never forget, there was a Chinese restaurant in Chislehurst called the Hong Kong Garden. Me and my friend were really upset that we used to go there and like, occasionally when the skinheads would turn up it would really turn really ugly. These gits would just go in en masse and just terrorise these Chinese people who were working there. We'd try and say 'Leave them alone', you know. It was a kind of tribute.

She also stated:

I remember wishing that I could be like Emma Peel from The Avengers and kick all the skinheads' heads in, because they used to mercilessly torment these people for being foreigners. It made me feel so helpless, hopeless and ill.

== Recording ==
The band's label, Polydor Records, booked a big recording studio in London, Olympic Studios, in July 1978 to record the song with the help of American producer Bruce Albertine, who was more into soul music. The result was not convincing; the band hated it. Their manager, Nils Stevenson, quickly decided to call another sound engineer, Steve Lillywhite, who had a musical approach closer to theirs. Lillywhite was in London at that time recording with Johnny Thunders. The group and Lillywhite chose to work in a more intimate place and opted for a smaller studio, the Fallout Shelter located in the basement of Island Records.

Lillywhite re-recorded the song in two days: "Hong Kong Garden" would be his first hit record as a producer. He was hired because of his ability to get a certain sound on drums. Lillywhite told Banshees drummer Kenny Morris to not record all the drums at the same time. Morris did the bass drum and the snare drum first. Then he did the cymbals and the tom-toms later. Lillywhite also added echo on the drums, adding significant space to the entire recording. NME retrospectively said that Lillywhite's work "revolutionis[ed] the post-punk band's sound with an innovative approach to laying down the drums".

== Release and reception ==
"Hong Kong Garden" was released on 18 August 1978 by Polydor Records. It reached number 7 on the UK Singles Chart, and became one of the first post-punk hits.

The record was featured as "Single of the Week" in NME, Melody Maker, Sounds and Record Mirror. The song was described by Paul Rambali of NME as "a bright, vivid narrative, something like snapshots from the window of a speeding Japanese train, power charged by the most original, intoxicating guitar playing heard in a long, long time". Melody Maker underlined: "The elements come together with remarkable effects. The song is strident and powerful with tantalising oriental guitar riffs". Sounds hailed the song as "constructed in the time-honoured tradition of all good singles – catchy, original arrangement coupled with an irresistible sing-along chorus". Record Mirror described the effect the record had as "accessibility incarnated [...] I'm playing it every third record. I love every second". One year after its first broadcast on a John Peel session, critic Ian Birch reviewed the Cure's song "Killing an Arab" in early 1979, saying: "As 'Hong Kong Garden' used a simple Oriental-styled riff to striking effect, so ['Killing An] Arab' conjures up edginess through a Moorish-flavour guitar pattern".

=== Reissue ===
In April 2014, "Hong Kong Garden" was reissued on double 7-inch vinyl with new artwork and an eight-page booklet, overseen by Siouxsie and Steven Severin. The first disc featured the original B-side "Voices". The second disc included the 2006 version of "Hong Kong Garden" with the orchestral introduction (reworked for the soundtrack to the film Marie Antoinette), backed with the 1984 version of "Voices" from The Thorn EP.

== Legacy ==
Sonic Youth vocalist and guitarist Thurston Moore named "Hong Kong Garden" as one of his all-time favourite songs. Uffie covered "Hong Kong Garden" on her debut album, mentioning it was one of her favorite songs.

== Other versions ==
On the first studio version recorded by the BBC in February 1978, the "Oriental" hook was played on a pixiphone, a toy glockenspiel with metallic bars; this version was later issued on both Voices on the Air: The Peel Sessions and At the BBC.

On the second version recorded for Polydor in June 1978, the instrument used was a xylophone, an instrument with wooden bars. This Polydor version was released as a stand-alone single. When Siouxsie and the Banshees' debut album The Scream came out later in the year, "Hong Kong Garden" was not included. It later surfaced on the singles compilation album Once Upon a Time/The Singles. In 2002, the song was remastered for release on The Best of Siouxsie and the Banshees.

In 2006, a reworked version of "Hong Kong Garden" was included on the soundtrack to Sofia Coppola's film Marie Antoinette, augmented by a new orchestral string introduction arranged by Brian Reitzell.

== Track listings ==
All tracks are written by John McKay, Kenny Morris, Siouxsie Sioux and Steven Severin.

7-inch single
No.	Title	Producer(s)	Length
1.	"Hong Kong Garden"	Nils Stevenson; Steve Lillywhite	2:52
2.	"Voices"	Stevenson; Bruce Albertine	5:33

2014 limited-edition 7-inch single
No.	Title	Producer(s)	Length
1.	"Hong Kong Garden"	Stevenson; Lillywhite	2:52
2.	"Voices"	Stevenson; Albertine	5:33
3.	"Hong Kong Garden" (Marie Antoinette strings version)		3:12
4.	"Voices (On the Air)" (The Thorn version)	Siouxsie and the Banshees; Mike Hedges	5:25

== Charts ==
Chart (1978)	Peak position
Australia (Kent Music Report)	38
Ireland (IRMA)	10
UK Singles (Official Charts)	7
