= Here Comes That Day =

Single by Siouxsie

from the album Mantaray
- Released: 29 October 2007
- Recorded: 2007
- Genre: Pop rock
- Length: 4:03
- Label: W14
- Songwriters: Siouxsie; Noko (Norman Fisher Jones); Kookie (Kim Hoglund); Howard Gray
- Producers: Steve Evans; Charlie Jones

Siouxsie singles chronology
"Into a Swan" (2007)	"Here Comes That Day" (2007)	"About to Happen" (2008)

Music video
- "Here Comes That Day" on YouTube

"Here Comes That Day" is a song co-written and recorded by Siouxsie, for her 2007 solo album Mantaray. It was released as the album's second single in the UK on 29 October 2007. It was critically acclaimed upon release.

== Music, release, critical reception and pop culture ==
The song was described by music critics as "pop noir", a "Shirley Bassey-strut", a "brass-festooned swagger", a "moody and sultry jazz-tinged number" and a "brassy, withering put-down of some unfortunate, sniveling weasel, whose duplicity is exposed in no short order".

The single received critical acclaim. MusicOMH named "Here Comes That Day" as one of several tracks on Mantaray which should be an "instant hit". The Guardian rated it as one of the singles of the week, describing it as "60s pop, replete with severe and sexy vocals", it "aches with a lifetime of insight and colour, yet still manages to sound refreshing and original". Manchester Evening News wrote that it was "the best [James] Bond theme that never was. Brassy and theatrical", "it strongly recalls and indeed surpasses classic Shirley Bassey". Walesonline rated it as one of the 3 best singles of 2007 saying, it was the "standout highlight" from Mantaray with "dramatic blasts of brass and killer beats."

"Here Comes That Day" was named "Single of the Week" on BBC Radio 2 on 15 September 2007. Due to its popularity, the track entered the UK Singles Chart prior to the official release date, peaking at number 93, but failed to remain in the top 100 following the full release of the single, and fell to number 103.

The video of "Here Comes That Day" was shot in Paris on the first floor of Eiffel Tower (La Tour Eiffel) on 29 September 2007, during a private concert, a few weeks before the opening date of "The Mantaray And More Tour".

The song was used in the TV series The Iris Affair (2025) for the opening-credits music.

== Track list ==
=== 7" vinyl ===
1. "Here Comes That Day"
2. "Here Comes That Day (Instrumental)"

=== CD single ===
1. "Here Comes That Day"
2. "Here Comes That Day (FlyKKiller Remix)"
3. "Here Comes That Day (Freelance Hellraiser Fuzzy Kerbox Remix)"

=== 12" single ===
1. "Here Comes That Day (Freelance Hellraiser Fuzzy Kerbox Remix)"
2. "Here Comes That Day (Evans & Jones Remix)"
