= LCD Soundsystem (album) =

Studio album by LCD Soundsystem
- Released: January 24, 2005
- Recorded: 2002–2004
- Studios: Long View Farm (North Brookfield); Plantain Recording House (New York City)
- Genres: Dance-punk; electronica; indie rock
- Length: 47:08 (standard version); 100:29 (double-disc version)
- Labels: DFA; Capitol; EMI
- Producer: The DFA

LCD Soundsystem studio albums chronology
LCD Soundsystem (2005)	45:33: Nike+ Original Run (2006)

Singles from LCD Soundsystem
- 1. "Movement" Released: November 8, 2004; 2. "Daft Punk Is Playing at My House" Released: February 21, 2005; 3. "Disco Infiltrator" Released: June 6, 2005; 4. "Tribulations" Released: September 27, 2005

LCD Soundsystem is the debut studio album by the American rock band of the same name. It was released on January 24, 2005, jointly through DFA and Capitol Records in the United States and EMI elsewhere. The album was produced by the DFA, a production group composed of LCD Soundsystem member James Murphy and former Unkle member Tim Goldsworthy. Musically, the album encompasses genres that range from dance-punk to electronica and indie rock to dance music.

Upon its release, the album was critically acclaimed by music critics. Commercially, the album peaked within the top 10 of both the US Top Dance Albums and Belgian Albums Chart. It was also nominated for the 2006 Grammy Award for Best Electronic/Dance Album. Eight singles were released to promote the album, including the band's breakout "Daft Punk Is Playing at My House", which reached number one on the UK Dance Chart in March 2005, and was nominated in the Best Dance Recording category at the 2006 Grammys.

== Critical reception ==
Professional ratings
Aggregate scores
Source	Rating
Metacritic	86/100
Review scores
Source	Rating
AllMusic	4.5/5 stars
Blender	5/5 stars
Entertainment Weekly	A−
The Guardian	3/5 stars
NME	8/10
Pitchfork	8.2/10
Q	4/5 stars
Rolling Stone	4/5 stars
Spin	B+
Uncut	5/5 stars

LCD Soundsystem received widespread acclaim from music critics. At Metacritic, which assigns a normalised rating out of 100 to reviews from mainstream critics, the album received an average score of 86, based on 35 reviews. Andy Kellman of AllMusic wrote that LCD Soundsystem "has few weak spots and unfolds smoothly as you listen to it from beginning to end." In his review for Rolling Stone, Barry Walters said that the album showed that LCD Soundsystem were "both underground hitmakers and bona fide album artists." Drowned in Sound critic Gareth Dobson called it "a disparate yet cohesive collection of songs" and said that "the majority of LCD Soundsystem is an excellent thump into 2005."

Simon Reynolds, writing in Blender, wrote that the album's "influences meld to form a seductive — if clearly deeply conflicted — self." While expressing disappointment that the album did not fully meet the expectations set by the band's early singles and lacked "very many surprises here, either in the bank of sounds Murphy pulls out, or in how he uses them", Dominique Leone of Pitchfork went on to award LCD Soundsystem the website's "Best New Music" accolade, though still concluding that it contained "plenty of good-not-great stuff" and was "a tad unfocused". Assigning the album a one-star honorable mention rating, Robert Christgau of The Village Voice noted Murphy's alternation between "dance guy or rock guy, optimist or cynic".

PopMatters' Matt Cibula praised the inclusion of the second disc of previously released material, but stated that "the real gems are to be found on the new stuff" and called LCD Soundsystem "a great record." Rob Ortenzi of Alternative Press described LCD Soundsystem as "an album that will survive the fleeting tastes of cosmopolitan hipsters" and stated that "in two records' time, Murphy will be as respected as The Sugarhill Gang, Brian Eno and Suicide." No Ripcord's Ben Bollig said that the album had "all the makings of a modern classic" and that "LCD Soundsystem is knowing and knowledgeable, inspired and inspirational. Intellectual without being snotty, encyclopaedic yet accessible, it takes the seemingly stalled electro model and kick-starts it into outer space."

=== Accolades ===
Online music magazine Pitchfork placed LCD Soundsystem at number 113 on their list of top 200 albums of the 2000s. It was also named the fifth best album of the decade by Resident Advisor. No Ripcord placed it at number 63 on their list of the Top 100 Albums of 2000–2009.

== Track listing ==
All tracks are written by James Murphy, except where noted.

Disc one
No.	Title	Length
1.	"Daft Punk Is Playing at My House"	5:16
2.	"Too Much Love"	5:42
3.	"Tribulations"	4:59
4.	"Movement"	3:04
5.	"Never as Tired as When I'm Waking Up"	4:49
6.	"On Repeat"	8:01
7.	"Thrills"	3:42
8.	"Disco Infiltrator"	4:56
9.	"Great Release"	6:35
Total length:		47:08

Disc two (Note: Disc 2 features previously released singles and their B-sides.)
No.	Title	Writer(s)	Length
1.	"Losing My Edge"		7:51
2.	"Beat Connection"	Murphy; Tim Goldsworthy	8:08
3.	"Give It Up"		3:55
4.	"Tired"	Murphy; Pat Mahoney	3:34
5.	"Yeah" (Crass version)	Murphy; Goldsworthy	9:21
6.	"Yeah" (Pretentious version)	Murphy; Goldsworthy	11:06
7.	"Yr City's a Sucker" (Full version)		9:22
Total length:			53:21

== Personnel ==
All credits for LCD Soundsystem are adapted from the album's liner notes; specific credits taken from Tidal.

Musicians

- James Murphy – most sounds; vocals, songwriting (all); drums, programming (1, 2, 4–6, 9–12, 14–16); bass (1, 2, 5, 6, 9–16); percussion (1, 4–6, 9, 11, 12, 14–16); organ (1, 2); claps (1); synthesizer (2, 4–6, 9–12, 14–16); guitar (4, 13, 16); mixing (4); production (5, 6, 9–11, 14, 15); piano (16)
- Tim Goldsworthy – other sounds; synthesizer, programming (5, 6, 9, 11, 14, 15); songwriting (11, 14, 15)
- Eric Broucek – other sounds, assistance; claps (1, 8, 16); percussion (2, 16); guitar, production (16)
- Tyler Pope – other sounds; bass (2, 4–6, 9, 14, 15)
- Nancy Whang – other sounds; additional vocals (2, 5, 6, 9–11, 14, 15)
- Patrick Mahoney – other sounds; drums, percussion, synthesizer, keyboards, backing vocals, songwriting (13)
- Mandy Coon – other sounds; background vocals (8)
- Marcus Lambkin – percussion (2)
- Alex Epton – synthesizer (10)

Production

- The DFA – production (all); mixing (except 4)
- Matt Thornley – production (2)
- Andy Wallace – mixing
- Alan Douches – mastering
- Ian Hatton – engineering and programming assistance
- Mike Lapierre – engineering and programming assistance
- Steve Sisco – engineering and programming assistance
- Josh Wilbur – engineering and programming assistance
- John O'Mahony – engineering and programming assistance
- Michael Vadino – art direction and design
- James Murphy – art direction and design

== Charts ==
As of January 2016, the album has sold about 147,000 copies in United States, according to Nielsen SoundScan. About 91,400 of those are physical copies, and about 55,100 of those are digital copies.

=== Weekly charts ===
Chart (2005)	Peak position
Belgian Albums (Ultratop Flanders)	6
Belgian Albums (Ultratop Wallonia)	47
Dutch Albums (Album Top 100)	28
Finnish Albums (Suomen virallinen lista)	40
French Albums (SNEP)	51
Italian Albums (FIMI)	50
Norwegian Albums (VG-lista)	18
Scottish Albums (Official Charts)	21
Swedish Albums (Sverigetopplistan)	41
UK Albums (Official Charts)	20
US Top Dance Albums (Billboard)	6
Chart (2007)	Peak position
UK Dance Albums (Official Charts)	5

=== Year-end charts ===
Chart (2005)	Position
Belgian Albums (Ultratop Flanders)	90
US Top Dance/Electronic Albums (Billboard)	20

== Certifications ==
Region	Certification	Certified units/sales
United Kingdom (BPI)	Gold	100,000^{^}
^{^} Shipments figures based on certification alone.
