= About to Happen =

Single by Siouxsie

from the album Mantaray
- Released: 10 March 2008
- Recorded: 2007
- Genre: Alternative rock
- Length: 2:50
- Label: W14
- Songwriters: Siouxsie; Noko (Norman Fisher Jones); Charlie Jones; Steve Evans
- Producers: Steve Evans; Charlie Jones

Siouxsie singles chronology
"Here Comes That Day" (2007)	"About to Happen" (2008)	"Love Crime" (2015)

"About to Happen" is a song by Siouxsie. It was written by Siouxsie, Noko, Charlie Jones and Steve Evans for her album Mantaray. The song was released in the UK on 10 March 2008 as the third and final single from the album. It was promoted by a live performance of the song on Jonathan Ross' TV show in the UK.

"About to Happen" was released in several formats, including two 7" vinyl records and a CD single. B-sides included live recordings from Siouxsie's show at the Eiffel Tower in 2007.

The single peaked on the UK Singles Chart at number 154.

== Track listing ==
=== CD single ===
1. "About to Happen"
2. "Here Comes That Day (Live)"
3. "Hello, I Love You (Live)"

=== 7-inch vinyl 1 ===
1. "About to Happen (Radio Edit)"
2. "About to Happen (Live from Le Tour Eiffel, Paris, France)"

=== 7-inch vinyl 2 ===
1. "About to Happen (Radio Edit)"
2. "If It Doesn't Kill You (Live from Le Tour Eiffel, Paris, France)"
