= 45:33 =

Studio album by LCD Soundsystem

45:33: Nike+ Original Run

Studio album by LCD Soundsystem
- Released: October 17, 2006
- Recorded: July – September 2006
- Studio: DFA (New York City)
- Genres: Progressive electronic; disco; funk; synth-pop
- Length: 45:58
- Label: Nike+ Sport Music
- Producers: Eric Broucek; The DFA

LCD Soundsystem studio albums chronology
LCD Soundsystem (2005)	45:33: Nike+ Original Run (2006)	Sound of Silver (2007)

"45:33" is a six-part composition by American rock band LCD Soundsystem. Commissioned by Nike, it was released digitally as a one-track studio album on October 17, 2006, as part of the Nike+ Original Run series. Initially, it was available exclusively through the Nike Music Store on iTunes. New York–based creative lifestyle marketing and public relations agency Cornerstone helped the musical efforts and coordinated the track. A CD re-release with three bonus tracks was issued by DFA Records on November 12, 2007, with the "45:33" composition also receiving a vinyl release. An eight track remix CD entitled 45:33 Remixes was released September 2009.

== Background and composition ==
The composition was recorded between July and September 2006 at DFA Studios in New York City. The publicity for "45:33" described it as being designed to accompany jogging workouts, "to reward and push at good intervals of a run." An early statement detailed that the composition had been refined after several runs on the treadmill. James Murphy later admitted that this was entirely a lie on his part, and that he does not actually jog. He stated that he wanted to make a long-form record like E2-E4 by Manuel Göttsching and used the opportunity provided by Nike to do so. The artwork of "45:33" also resembles that of Göttsching's work.

Parts of "45:33" were later used on the album Sound of Silver, in particular the track "Someone Great", which appears on "45:33" as an instrumental section later distinguished as track 3. The complete track was also released for registered Nike+ users in late March 2007 as a gift of appreciation when Nike+ logged its 10 millionth mile. The composition was available to be sold by Nike via iTunes for six months. The actual length of the composition is slightly longer than 45:33; the title is instead a reference to the two common vinyl speeds, 45 and 33 RPM. The composition has been described musically as progressive electronic, disco, funk, and synth-pop.

For the last series of concerts at Terminal 5 and Madison Square Garden, LCD Soundsystem performed "45:33" in full during the second set, with "Sound of Silver" replacing Part 3. Part 3 was saved until their performance of "Someone Great". On the digital release of the concert, the 45:33 tracks were titled: "45:33 Intro", "You Can't Hide / Shame On You", "Out In Space" and "Ships Talking".

== Re-release ==
45:33
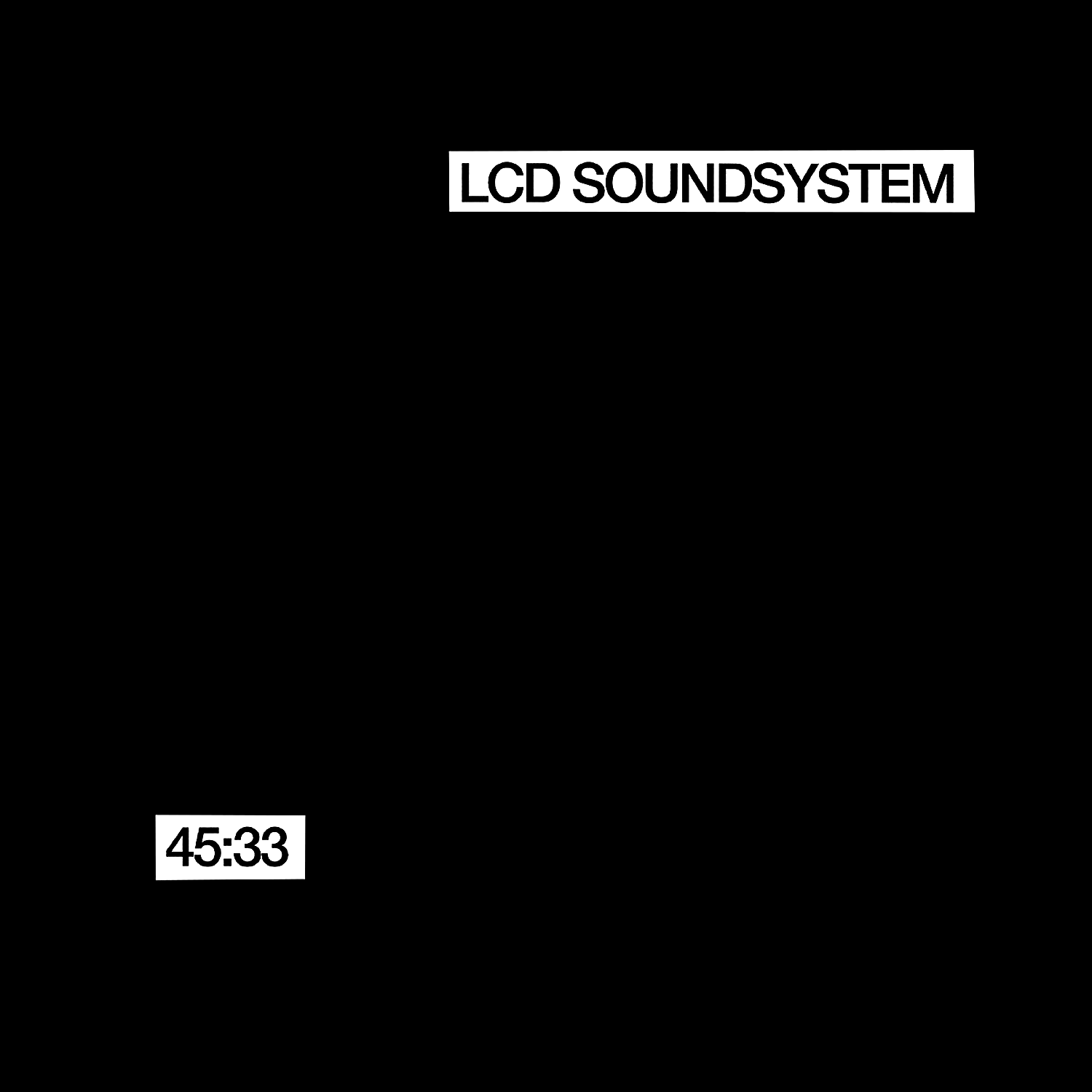

Compilation album by LCD Soundsystem
- Released: November 12, 2007
- Recorded: July – September 2006
- Studio: DFA (New York City)
- Genres: Electronica; dance-punk; disco; funk; synth-pop
- Length: 71:02
- Labels: DFA; EMI
- Producers: Eric Broucek; The DFA

LCD Soundsystem chronology
A Bunch of Stuff (2007)	45:33 (2007)	45:33 Remixes (2009)

DFA Records announced that "45:33" would be re-released on November 12, 2007. It was made available on CD and vinyl through DFA and EMI. The re-release featured three bonus tracks, "Freak Out/Starry Eyes", James Murphy and Eric Broucek's dub remix of "North American Scum", and "Hippie Priest Bum-out", all of which were B-sides from European versions of Sound of Silver singles. These three tracks would also be made available together separately on the Confuse the Marketplace EP, released on December 11, 2007. "45:33" was re-released as a limited edition white-label vinyl on May 26, 2015.

== Critical reception ==
Professional ratings
Aggregate scores
Source	Rating
Metacritic	86/100
Review scores
Source	Rating
AllMusic	4/5 stars
Alternative Press	4.5/5 stars
The A.V. Club	A
Entertainment Weekly	A
The Guardian	4/5 stars
The Irish Times	4/5 stars
NME	7/10
Pitchfork	8.0/10
Stylus Magazine	A−
Uncut	4/5 stars

"45:33" received critical acclaim. On the review aggregator website Metacritic, which assigns a weighted average out of 100 points, the album received an average critic score of 86, based on 25 reviews, indicating "universal acclaim". Manuel Göttsching was, however, critical of the composition, despite it being inspired by his own work, stating: "Musically, there is nothing related to E2-E4 – it's just a 'megamix' of his work."

== Track listing ==
=== iTunes release ===
45:33: Nike+ Original Run
No.	Title	Length
1.	"45:33"	45:58

=== Re-release ===
Note: The first six tracks are listed simply as "45:33".

No.	Title	Alternate title	Length
1.	"45:33" (part 1)	"Intro"	2:51
2.	"45:33" (part 2)	"You Can't Hide (Shame on You)"	6:31
3.	"45:33" (part 3)	"Someone Great (Instrumental)"	8:30
4.	"45:33" (part 4)	"Out in Space"	10:42
5.	"45:33" (part 5)	"Ships Talking"	9:18
6.	"45:33" (part 6)	"Outro"	8:13
7.	"Freak Out/Starry Eyes"		12:22
8.	"North American Scum" (Onanistic Dub by James Murphy and Eric Broucek)		8:57
9.	"Hippie Priest Bum-out"		4:28

== Personnel ==
- James Murphy – drums, percussion, drum programming, handclaps, bass guitar, guitar, vocals, glockenspiel, clavinet, organ, synthesizer, vocoder
- Nancy Whang – vocals (on re-release tracks 7/8/9)

Additional personnel

- Alex Frankel – Wurlitzer piano
- Eric Broucek – programming
- Jason Disu;– trombone
- Carter Yasutake;– trumpet
- Terra Deva;– vocals

== Charts ==
Chart (2006–2007)	Peak position
Belgian Albums (Ultratop Flanders)	68
UK Albums (OCC)	128
US Top Dance Albums (Billboard)	7
US Digital Albums (Billboard) 45:33: Nike+ Original Run	20
