= Disco Infiltrator =

Single by LCD Soundsystem

from the album LCD Soundsystem
- B-side: "Slowdive"
- Released: June 6, 2005
- Genre: Alternative dance
- Length: 4:55
- Label: DFA Records
- Songwriter: James Murphy

LCD Soundsystem singles chronology
"Daft Punk Is Playing at My House" (2005)	"Disco Infiltrator" (2005)	"Tribulations" (2005)

"Disco Infiltrator" is a song from the eponymous debut album by LCD Soundsystem. It was released on 6 June 2005 as the debut's sixth single. The song was written by LCD Soundsystem's frontman James Murphy and produced by Murphy and Tim Goldsworthy as The DFA. It contains a sample from Kraftwerk's "Home Computer".

The B-side of the 7" release is a cover version of Siouxsie and the Banshees' "Slowdive" from their 1982 album, A Kiss in the Dreamhouse. The cover was recorded during a live in-studio performance for XFM London.

== Track listing ==
7" (dfaemi7 2145)
No.	Title	Length
1.	"Disco Infiltrator" (Radio Edit)	3:39
2.	"Slowdive" (XFM Session)	4:04

CD (dfaemi 2145cd)
No.	Title	Length
1.	"Disco Infiltrator" (Album Version)	4:59
2.	"Slowdive" (XFM Session)	4:04

== Personnel ==
All credits for the Disco Infiltrator adapted from the single's liner notes.

LCD Soundsystem

- James Murphy – vocals (all); all instruments (1)
- Patrick Mahoney – drums (2)
- Philip Mossman – guitar (2)
- Tyler Pope – bass (2)
- Nancy Whang – synthesizer (2)

Additional musicians

- Eric Broucek – production assistant, handclaps (1)
- Nancy Coon – background vocals (1)

Production

- The DFA – production (all); mixing (1)
- Andy Wallace – mixing (1)
- Rob Carmichael – design
- DFA Design – design
