= Franz Ferdinand discography =

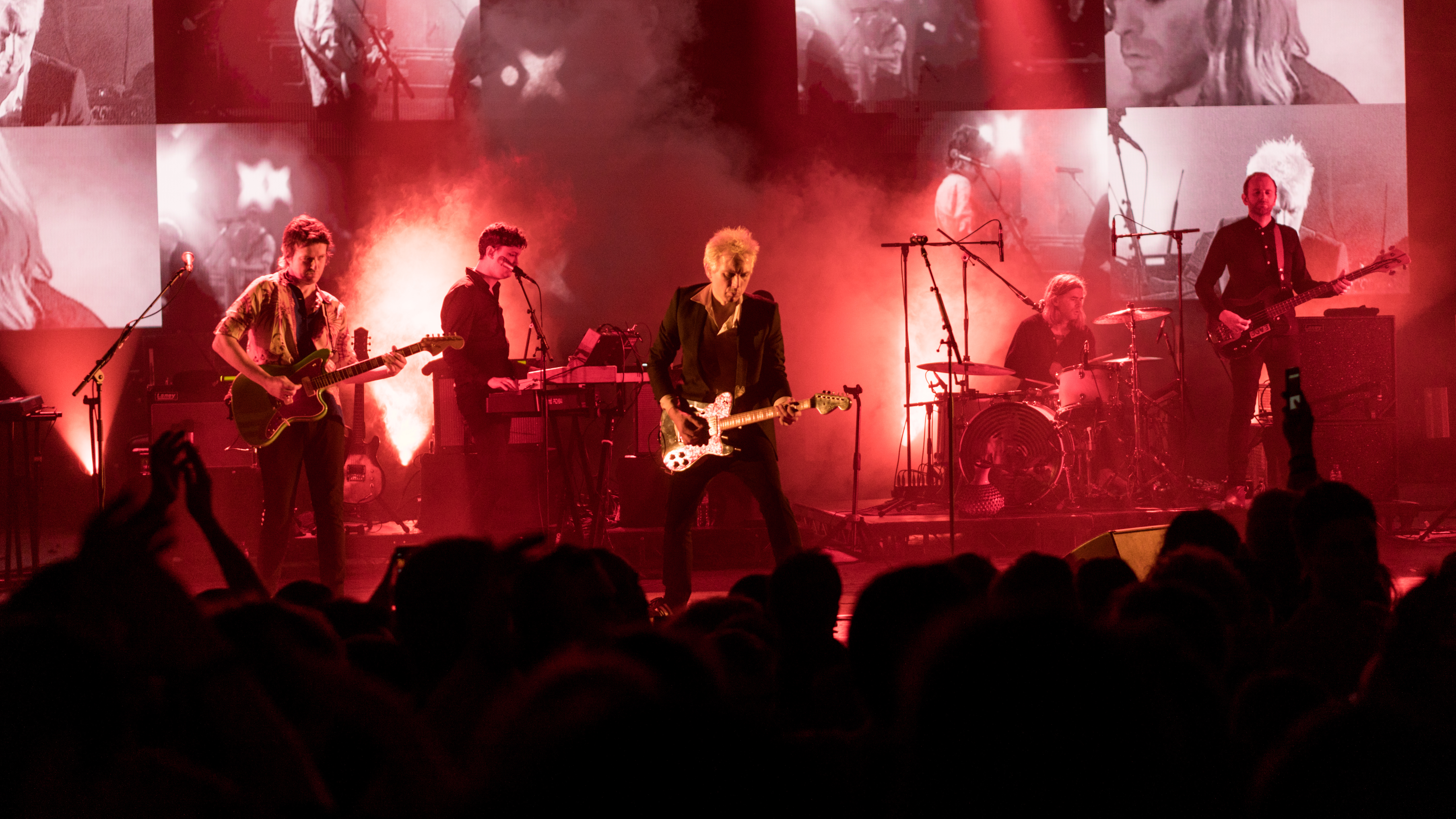
- Franz Ferdinand performing live in 2018
- Studio albums: 6
- Extended plays: 7
- Live albums: 3
- Compilation albums: 2
- Singles: 29
- Video albums: 1
- Music videos: 33
- Remix albums: 1
- Promotional singles: 5

The discography of Franz Ferdinand, a Scottish indie rock band, consists of six studio albums, one remix album, two compilation albums, three live albums, one video album, six extended plays, 29 singles, four promotional singles and 33 music videos.

The band first experienced major chart success with their second single, "Take Me Out", which peaked at number three on the UK Singles Chart. The release of the single was followed by their debut album, Franz Ferdinand, which debuted at number three on the UK Albums Chart. The band went on to win the 2004 Mercury Music Prize and two BRIT Awards in 2005 for Best British Group and Best British Rock Act. NME named Franz Ferdinand as their Album of the Year for 2004.

Additionally, Franz Ferdinand recorded and released one album as FFS (an abbreviation of Franz Ferdinand and Sparks), a collaborative supergroup with American art rock band Sparks, in 2015.

== Albums ==
=== Studio albums ===
List of albums, with selected chart positions and certifications
Title	Album details	Peak chart positions											Certifications
Title	Album details	SCO	AUS	BEL	CAN	FRA	GER	IRL	NLD	SWI	UK	US	Certifications
Franz Ferdinand	Released: 9 February 2004; Label: Domino; Formats: CD, LP, download	2	12	7	—	26	16	2	18	35	3	32	BPI: 4× Platinum; ARIA: Platinum; BRMA: Gold; BVMI: Gold; MC: 2× Platinum; RIAA: Platinum
You Could Have It So Much Better	Released: 28 September 2005; Label: Domino; Formats: CD, LP, download	1	5	4	3	5	2	2	9	4	1	8	BPI: Platinum; ARIA: Gold; BRMA: Gold; BVMI: Gold; IFPI SWI: Gold; MC: Gold; RIAA: Gold
Tonight: Franz Ferdinand	Released: 26 January 2009; Label: Domino; Formats: CD, LP, box set, download	2	6	4	2	4	2	10	4	3	2	9	BPI: Gold; MC: Gold
Right Thoughts, Right Words, Right Action	Released: 26 August 2013; Label: Domino; Formats: CD, LP, download	2	18	5	7	6	4	19	3	3	6	24	
Always Ascending	Released: 9 February 2018; Label: Domino; Formats: CD, CS, LP, download	3	28	21	31	14	13	35	19	5	6	59	
The Human Fear	Released: 10 January 2025; Label: Domino; Formats: CD, CS, LP, download	1	—	33	—	29	11	—	31	6	3	— (Note: The Human Fear did not enter the US Billboard 200, but peaked at number 40 on the Album Sales Chart.)	
"—" denotes releases that did not chart or were not released in that territory.

=== Remix albums ===
List of albums
Title	Album details
Blood: Franz Ferdinand	Released: 18 April 2009; Label: Domino; Formats: CD, LP, download

=== Compilation albums ===
List of albums, with selected chart positions
Title	Album details	Peak chart positions									
Title	Album details	SCO	AUS	BEL	FRA	GER	JPN	NLD	SWI	UK	US
Late Night Tales: Franz Ferdinand	Released: 15 September 2014; Label: Late Night Tales; Formats: CD, LP, download	—	—	—	150	—	—	—	—	—	—
Hits to the Head	Released: 11 March 2022; Label: Domino; Formats: CD, LP, cassette, download	4	76	22	55	9	45	31	15	7	— (Note: Hits to the Head did not enter the US Billboard 200, but peaked at number 42 on the Album Sales Chart.)

=== Live albums ===
List of albums
Title	Album details
Live 2003	Released: 22 Dec 2003; Label: Self-released; Formats: Vinyl
Live 2014 at the London Roundhouse	Released: 26 May 2014; Label: Concert Live; Formats: CD, download
Live At The Barrowlands	Released: 24 Feb 2026; Label: Domino; Formats: Vinyl

=== Video releases ===
List of video albums
Title	Album details	Peak chart positions		Certifications
Title	Album details	JPN	UK	Certifications
Franz Ferdinand	Released: 28 November 2005; Label: Domino; Formats: DVD	57	— (Note: Franz Ferdinand did not enter the UK Albums Chart, but peaked at number 18 on the UK Official Music Video Chart Top 50.)	RIAA: Platinum

== Extended plays ==
List of extended plays
Title	EP details	Peak chart positions
Title	EP details	UK
Remixes	Released: 2006; Label: Domino; Formats: 12-inch, CD	—
iTunes Festival: London 2009	Released: 9 July 2009; Label: Domino (via NME); Formats: Download	—
Covers	Released: 16 April 2011; Label: Domino; Formats: 12-inch, CD, download	— (Note: Covers EP did not enter the UK Singles Chart, but peaked at number 22 on the UK Physical Singles Chart Top 100.)
The North Sea (Note: The North Sea is a pseudonym for Franz Ferdinand. The actual track listing includes two remixes, by Todd Terje, of the songs from Right Thoughts, Right Words, Right Action: "Evil Eye (Todd Terje Extended Mix)" and "Stand on the Horizon (Todd Terje Extended Mix)".)	Released: 29 July 2013; Label: Domino; Formats: 12-inch, download	—
Live E.P. (Note: Live E.P. is a free Amazon.com release. Includes 3 tracks from Right Thoughts, Right Words, Right Action deluxe edition bonus disc.)	Released: 12 August 2013; Label: Domino; Formats: Download	—
Evil Action	Released: 18 September 2013; Label: Domino; Formats: CD, download	—
Spotify Sessions	Released: 4 February 2014; Label: Domino; Formats: Streamed audio	—

== Singles ==
List of singles, with selected chart positions and certifications, showing year released and album name
Title	Year	Peak chart positions										Certifications	Album
Title	Year	SCO	AUS	CAN	FRA	GER	IRL	JPN	NLD	UK	US	Certifications	Album
"Darts of Pleasure"	2003	35	—	—	—	—	—	—	—	44	—		Franz Ferdinand
"Take Me Out"	2004	2	25	7	92	—	8	—	72	3	66	BPI: 4× Platinum; MC: 4× Platinum; RIAA: 4× Platinum	Franz Ferdinand
"The Dark of the Matinée"	2004	7	—	—	—	88	27	—	73	8	—		Franz Ferdinand
"Michael"	2004	15	—	—	—	—	39	—	—	17	—		Franz Ferdinand
"This Fffire" (Note: "This Fffire" was only released as a commercial single in Australia and Europe, it was released as a radio and download single elsewhere.)	2004	—	62	—	—	—	—	—	85	— (Note: "This Fffire" was released as a download-only single, and reached #8 on the UK Download Chart.)	—		Non-album single
"Do You Want To"	2005	2	—	—	68	70	26	— (Note: "Do You Want To" did not enter the Billboard Japan Hot 100 chart, but peaked at number 169 on the Oricon Singles Chart.)	13	4	76	BPI: Silver; RIAA: Gold	You Could Have It So Much Better
"Walk Away"	2005	9	—	—	—	96	46	—	84	13	—		You Could Have It So Much Better
"The Fallen"	2006	4	51	—	—	—	41	—	91	14	—		You Could Have It So Much Better
"Eleanor Put Your Boots On"	2006	17	—	—	—	—	—	—	—	30	—		You Could Have It So Much Better
"Lucid Dreams" (Note: "Lucid Dreams" was only released as a digital download.)	2008	—	—	35	—	—	—	—	—	—	—		Non-album single
"Ulysses"	2008	3	62	73	31	41	—	3	74	20	—		Tonight: Franz Ferdinand
"No You Girls"	2009	3	34	54	46	80	—	39	95	22	— (Note: "No You Girls" did not enter the Billboard Hot 100, but peaked at number 6 on the Bubbling Under Hot 100 Singles chart.)	BPI: Silver	Tonight: Franz Ferdinand
"Can't Stop Feeling"	2009	28	—	—	69	—	—	—	—	— (Note: "Can't Stop Feeling" did not enter the UK Singles Chart, but peaked at number 27 on the UK Physical Singles Chart Top 100.)	—		Tonight: Franz Ferdinand
"What She Came For"	2009	59	—	—	—	—	—	—	—	— (Note: "What She Came For" did not enter the UK Singles Chart, but peaked at number 75 on the UK Physical Singles Chart Top 100.)	—		Tonight: Franz Ferdinand
"Live Alone"	2009	—	—	—	—	—	—	—	—	—	—		Tonight: Franz Ferdinand
"Right Action"	2013	—	—	—	—	—	—	22	—	— (Note: "Right Action" did not enter the UK Singles Chart, but peaked at number 11 on the UK Physical Singles Chart.)	—		Right Thoughts, Right Words, Right Action
"Love Illumination"	2013	—	—	—	148	—	—	—	— (Note: "Love Illumination" did not enter the Netherlands Single Top 100 but peaked on the Dutch Tipparade Chart at number nine.)	—	—		Right Thoughts, Right Words, Right Action
"Evil Eye"	2013	—	—	—	—	—	—	—	—	—	—		Right Thoughts, Right Words, Right Action
"Bullet"	2014	—	—	—	—	—	—	—	—	—	—		Right Thoughts, Right Words, Right Action
"Fresh Strawberries"	2014	—	—	—	—	—	—	—	—	— (Note: "Fresh Strawberries" did not enter the UK Singles Chart, but peaked at number 20 on the UK Physical Singles Chart.)	—		Right Thoughts, Right Words, Right Action
"Stand on the Horizon"	2014	—	—	—	—	—	—	—	—	—	—		Right Thoughts, Right Words, Right Action
"Always Ascending"	2017	—	—	—	—	—	—	— (Note: "Always Ascending" did not enter the Billboard Japan Hot 100 chart, but peaked at number 20 on the Billboard Japan Hot Overseas chart.)	—	—	—		Always Ascending
"Feel the Love Go"	2018	—	—	—	—	—	—	—	—	—	—		Always Ascending
"Lazy Boy"	2018	—	—	—	174	—	—	—	—	—	—		Always Ascending
"Glimpse of Love"	2018	—	—	—	—	—	—	—	—	—	—		Always Ascending
"Billy Goodbye"	2021	—	—	—	—	—	—	— (Note: "Billy Goodbye" did not enter the Billboard Japan Hot 100 chart, but peaked at number 16 on the Billboard Japan Hot Overseas chart.)	—	—	—		Hits to the Head
"Curious"	2022	—	—	—	—	—	—	—	—	—	—		Hits to the Head
"Audacious"	2024	—	—	—	—	—	—	— (Note: "Audacious" did not enter the Billboard Japan Hot 100 chart, but peaked at number 12 on the Billboard Japan Hot Overseas chart.)	— (Note: "Audacious" did not enter the Netherlands' Single Top 100, but peaked at number 36 on the Netherlands' Airplay Chart.)	—	—		The Human Fear
"Night or Day"	2024	—	—	—	—	—	—	— (Note: "Night or Day" did not enter the Billboard Japan Hot 100 chart, but peaked at number 9 on the Billboard Japan Hot Overseas chart.)	—	— (Note: "Night or Day" did not enter the UK Singles Chart, but peaked at number 94 on the UK Singles Sales Chart.)	—		The Human Fear
"Hooked"	2025	—	—	—	—	—	—	— (Note: "Hooked" did not enter the Billboard Japan Hot 100 chart, but peaked at number 13 on the Billboard Japan Hot Overseas chart.)	—	—	—		The Human Fear
"—" denotes releases that did not chart or were not released in that territory.

=== Promotional singles ===
List of singles, showing year released and album name
Title	Year	Album
"Get Up and Use Me" / "Jacqueline" (Note: "Get Up and Use Me" / "Jacqueline" was released as a limited edition 7" single. "Get Up and Use Me" is The Fire Engines song covered for the single by Franz Ferdinand, "Jacqueline" is vice versa. The same with "Liefde En Puin" / "Heisa-Ho" single with "Liefde En Puin" being a cover of "Love And Destroy" performed by De Kift and "Heisa-Ho" covered by Franz Ferdinand.) (with The Fire Engines)	2004	Non-album single
"I'm Your Villain"	2006	You Could Have It So Much Better
"Outsiders"	2006	You Could Have It So Much Better
"This Boy" (Rory Phillips Remix)	2006	You Could Have It So Much Better
"Fade Together"	2006	You Could Have It So Much Better
"Swallow, Smile" (Note: "Swallow, Smile" was released as a single exclusive to the band's official fan club.)	2006	Non-album single
"Die on the Floor" / "Katherine Hit Me"	2009	Blood
"Liefde En Puin" / "Heisa-Ho"^{[D]} (with De Kift)	2009	Non-album single
"The Eyes of Mars" (Note: "The Eyes of Mars" was released as limited edition 7" one-sided single) (with Marion Cotillard)	2010	Non-album single

== Other charted songs ==
Title	Year	Peak chart positions			Album
Title	Year	CIS	RUS	UKR	Album
"Take Me Out" (Daft Punk Remix)	2004	192	160	96	"Take Me Out" single

== Guest appearances ==
List of non-single guest appearances, showing year released and album name
Title	Year	Album
"Michael" (live)	2004	NME Awards 2004: Rare & Unreleased
"Jacqueline" (live)	2004	Songs To Save Your Life
"Tell Her Tonight" (live)	2004	Uncut Presents: 15-Track Pick Of The Best Recent Music
"Darts of Pleasure" (live)	2005	Austin City Limits Music Festival: Live From Austin, Texas 2004
"Do You Want To" (live)	2005	Point Exclusives: Volume 2
"A Song for Sorry Angel (Sorry Angel)" (with Jane Birkin)	2006	Monsieur Gainsbourg Revisited
"What You Waiting For?"	2006	Radio 1's Live Lounge
"Jackie Jackson"	2006	Colours Are Brighter: Songs from Children (And Grown-Ups Too)
"The Dark of the Matinée" (with Coco Freeman)	2006	Rhythms del Mundo: Cuba
"All My Friends"	2007	"All My Friends" single / A Bunch of Stuff EP (LCD Soundsystem)
"Hallam Foe Dandelion Blow"	2007	Hallam Foe: Original Soundtrack
"Sound and Vision" (featuring Girls Aloud)	2007	Radio 1: Established 1967
"No"	2007	David Shrigley's Worried Noodles
"Call Me"	2009	War Child Presents Heroes
"The Lobster Quadrille"	2010	Almost Alice
"Real Thing"	2012	Nardwuar The Human Serviette And The Evaporators Present: Busy Doing Nothing!
"Nardwuar Vs. Franz Ferdinand" (Interview) (with The Evaporators)	2012	Nardwuar The Human Serviette And The Evaporators Present: Busy Doing Nothing!
"Demagogue"	2016	30 Days, 50 Songs
"Take Me Out" (live)	2019	BBC Radio 1's Live Lounge: The Collection

== Music videos ==
List of music videos, showing year released and director
Title	Year	Director(s)
"Darts of Pleasure"	2003	Scott Lyon
"Take Me Out"	2004	Jonas Odell
"The Dark of the Matinée"	2004	Chris Hopewell
"Michael"	2004	Uwe Flade
"This Fire"	2004	StyleWar
"Do You Want To"	2005	Diane Martel
"Walk Away"	2005	Scott Lyon
"The Fallen"	2006	Alex & Martin
"L. Wells"	2006	Blair Young
"Jeremy Fraser"	2006	Scott Lyon
"Eleanor Put Your Boots On"	2006	Chris Hopewell
"Wine in the Afternoon"	2006	Blair Young
"All My Friends"	2007	Anna McCarthy
"Ulysses"	2009	Will Lovelace, Dylan Southern
"No You Girls"	2009	Nima Nourizadeh
"Can't Stop Feeling"	2009	Russell Weekes
"Right Action"	2013	Jonas Odell
"Love Illumination"	2013	Tim Saccenti
"Evil Eye"	2013	Diane Martel
"Bullet"	2013	Andy Knowles
"Erdbeer Mund"	2014	Anna McCarthy
"Fresh Strawberries"	2014	Margarita Louca
"Stand on the Horizon"	2014	Karan Kandhari
"Johnny Delusional"	2015	AB/CD/CD
"Piss Off"	2015	ROBiSROB
"Call Girl"	2015	Sasha Rainbow
"Always Ascending"	2017	AB/CD/CD
"Feel the Love Go"	2018	Diane Martel
"Glimpse of Love"	2018	Alice Kunisue
"Billy Goodbye"	2021	Diane Martel, Alex Kapranos, Ben Cole
"Curious"	2022	Andy Knowles
"Audacious"	2024	Andy Knowles
"Night or Day"	2024	Rianne White
