= Right Thoughts, Right Words, Right Action =

Studio album by Franz Ferdinand
- Released: 26 August 2013
- Recorded: 2013
- Studios: Black Pudding (Glasgow); Sausage (London); Ingrid (Stockholm); Club Ralph (London)
- Genres: Indie rock; dance-punk; disco-rock
- Length: 35:04
- Label: Domino
- Producers: Alex Kapranos (Note: Credited under the pseudonym Prince House Rabbit.); Joe Goddard; Alexis Taylor; Todd Terje; Björn Yttling

Franz Ferdinand chronology
Covers (2011)	Right Thoughts, Right Words, Right Action (2013)	Late Night Tales: Franz Ferdinand (2014)

Singles from Right Thoughts, Right Words, Right Action
- 1. "Right Action" Released: 27 June 2013; 2. "Love Illumination" Released: 27 June 2013; 3. "Evil Eye" Released: 28 October 2013; 4. "Bullet" Released: 20 January 2014; 5. "Fresh Strawberries" Released: 7 April 2014; 6. "Stand on the Horizon" Released: 28 July 2014

Right Thoughts, Right Words, Right Action is the fourth studio album by Scottish indie rock band Franz Ferdinand. It was released through the Domino Recording Company on 26 August 2013 in the United Kingdom and on 27 August in the United States. It was the band's first studio album since Tonight: Franz Ferdinand, which was released four years earlier. It is also the band's final album to feature guitarist Nick McCarthy.

Recorded during 2013, the album was recorded in multiple studios in different locations. It also features production from a number of musicians. Similar to Tonight, the album features more of a dance-oriented sound throughout. The band focused on making a generally positive and uplifting album with Right Thoughts, Right Words, Right Action. Band member Alex Kapranos, who provided production on the album, labeled it the band's "most positive record", stating that the album title reflects the mood of the album as well as the mood of the band members during the recording of the album.

The album received generally favourable reviews from music critics upon its release. It also had a significant commercial performance, with the album charting in the top 10 in several countries, including the band's home country of Scotland, where it peaked at number 2, and the UK, where it peaked at number 6. The album spawned six singles: "Right Action", "Love Illumination", "Evil Eye", "Bullet", "Fresh Strawberries", and "Stand on the Horizon".

== Background and recording ==
The band previewed many of their new tracks at live performances over 2012 and 2013. The album was recorded during 2013 at Alex Kapranos' Black Pudding Studio in Glasgow, Scotland, Nick McCarthy's Sausage Studios and Mark Ralph's Club Ralph in London, England, and Björn Yttling's Ingrid Studio in Stockholm, Sweden. According to band drummer Paul Thomson, most of the material on the album had been written and demoed at Sausage Studio and Black Pudding. The band recalled having about five or six sessions of recording. Instead of recording all the music at once, they sought out to record different batches of songs over a period of time. Kapranos described the album direction as "forward" and revealed that the band decided to keep a low profile about things as their last album was "tainted" by misinformation prior to its release. Regarding the lyrics, Kapranos said:

the idea of the cynic's search for optimism and the sceptic's search for a manual crop up here and there. I've always liked the lead character in Alasdair Gray's Lanark growing the hard scales to defend the soft inner-self from the world. Socially awkward asthmatic with a self-consuming imagination. My 19-year-old self was electrified. Maybe the album is about how to shed those scales."

=== Album title ===
Kapranos had talked about the background of the album title in a documentary about the album:

I think when you name a record, you have to choose something which you feel reflects the record or that collection of songs. You also want to choose something that reflects not just the mood of the record, but the mood of the people who made it... the mood of those people when they recorded it, and there were quite a few things that sort of came up as ideas, but Right Thoughts, Right Words, Right Action seemed to sum it up best. It's probably the most positive record we've made, and the band have been, yeah, the most optimistic we've been since before we had any encounter with the music industry... probably because we've been sort of keeping a low profile for a while and not talking about ourselves too much.

== Production and composition ==
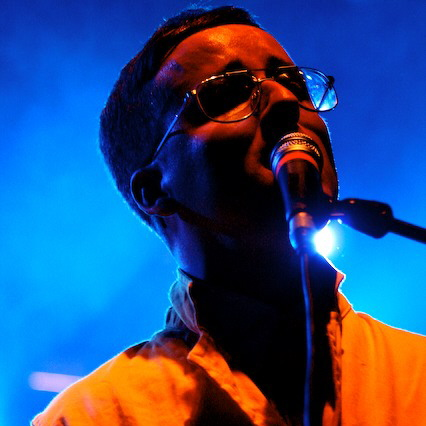
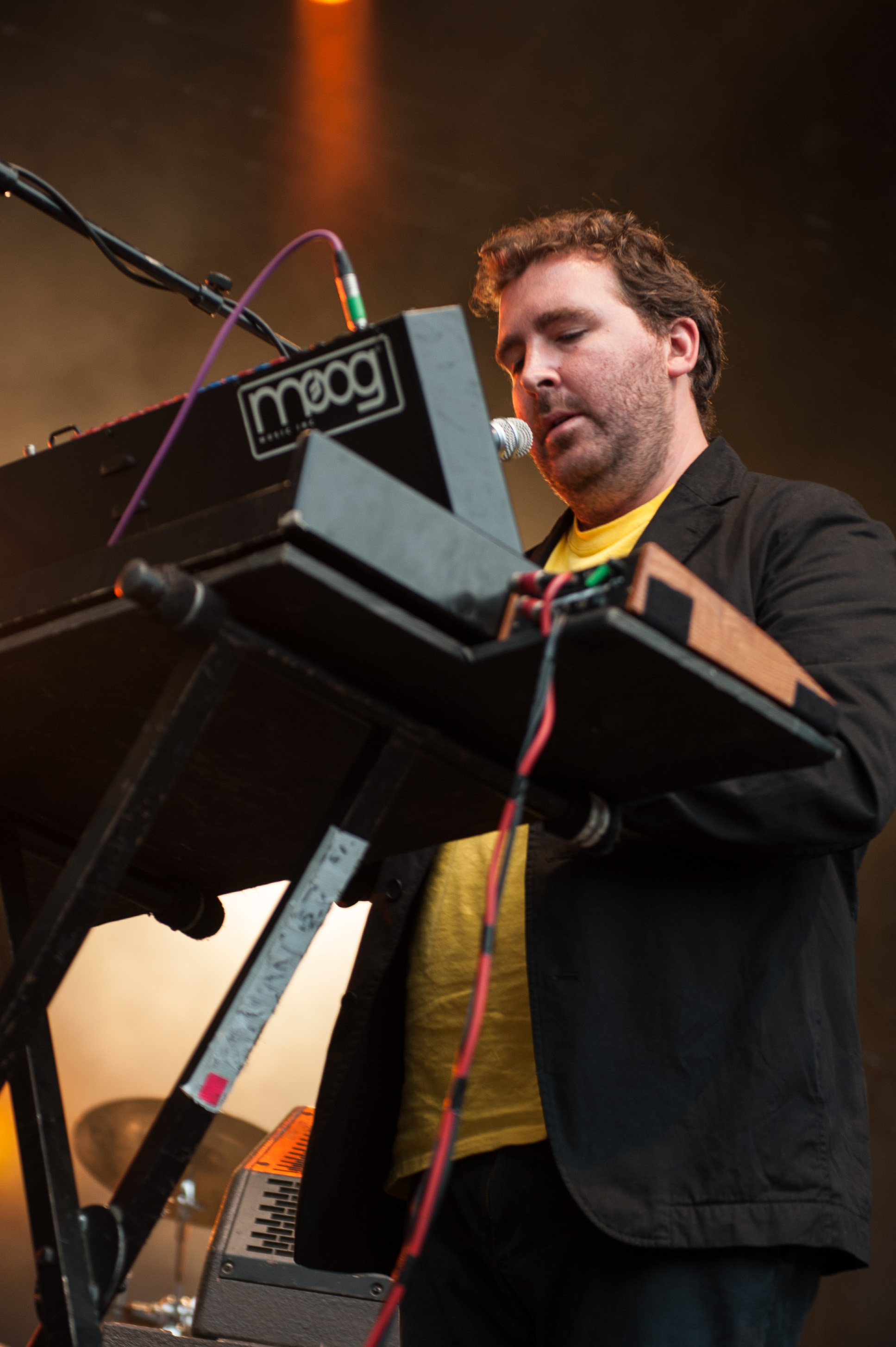
Hot Chip members Alexis Taylor (left) and Joe Goddard produced the songs "Right Action" and "Goodbye Lovers & Friends"

For Right Thoughts, Right Words, Right Action, Franz Ferdinand collaborated with other artists for parts of the album. Hot Chip band members Joe Goddard and Alexis Taylor produced the opening track "Right Action" and co-produced the final track "Goodbye Lovers and Friends", Norwegian DJ Todd Terje co-produced the tracks "Evil Eye" and "Stand on the Horizon", and Peter Bjorn and John band member Björn Yttling produced "Treason! Animals." and co-produced "The Universe Expanded". All tracks on the album were written by Alex Kapranos and Nick McCarthy, with additional writing from Bob Hardy on "Right Action" and "The Universe Expanded" as well as Alexander Ragnew on "Bullet". Kapranos also co-produced the majority of the album under the pseudonym "Prince House Rabbit", with the exception of "Right Action" and "Treason! Animals."

Right Thoughts, Right Words, Right Action features indie rock, dance-punk, and disco-rock throughout. The opening line to "Right Action" was inspired by a postcard Alex Kapranos had found in London, which featured the phrase "Come home, practically all is nearly forgiven". The following line "Right thoughts, right words, right action" was thought of as a "great response" to the former by Kapranos. "Evil Eye" is about the evil eye and all-seeing eye, which are things that Kapranos was very interested about. The guitar riff to "Love Illumination" was created by Kapranos and originally thought of as "too rocky" by Nick McCarthy, but he later claimed that he enjoyed playing it. The song was fully written and recorded during a weekend session at McCarthy's Sausage Studio. Kapranos explained the meaning of the song by stating:

We all feel as sensitive to satisfaction at times. We can look outside us and see nothing but destruction, avarice, and boredom. So we look to find that love where we can find it. Some people look to Hollywood, some people look to Blackpool and the bright lights of Blackpool. That's probably where I would look.

"Stand on the Horizon" was labeled by Kapranos as something neither Franz Ferdinand or Todd Terje, the co-producer of the song, have done before. He also called the ending of the song "a beautiful, uplifting piece of music". For "Fresh Strawberries", the band called upon Roxanne Clifford of Veronica Falls to provide additional vocals for the song. The band originally wanted a falsetto section for the song, but they were not able to reach the necessary high notes themselves, which is why they wanted Clifford to provide vocals. The idea for "The Universe Expanded" comes from the theory of universe expansion. Kapranos calls the song both "heartbreaking" and "funny" at the same time. The song also features a heartbeat for a kick drum and scratches of stubble for hi-hats.

The album originally intended to feature 11 songs, including "Scarlet & Blue" (also known as "Bring Me Your Love") which was often played during the band's 2012 tour. However, the band didn't manage to fit it to the final track listing and ultimately left the song unreleased.

== Release ==
The album was announced on 14 May 2013 with a teaser trailer video along with updates from the band's social networks, revealing the cover art, the album title and the full track listing. On the same day, the album was also made available to pre-order from Domino in various versions. The album became available for free streaming on the NPR Music website. The album is also available to stream on Spotify. The album was released as a digital download, CD, deluxe double CD, 12" vinyl, and deluxe double 12" vinyl packaged in a hand numbered die-cut gatefold sleeve. The exclusive bonus disc in both the double CD and double vinyl LP, entitled Right Notes, Right Words, Wrong Order, is a live session recording captured at Konk Studios in London. Right Thoughts, Right Words, Right Actions – The Passport Edition is a deluxe package limited to 500 copies worldwide and features a deluxe edition of each physical format of the album, all 7" and 12" singles and access to the highest quality audio files possible as well as exclusive tracks and content.

== Promotion ==
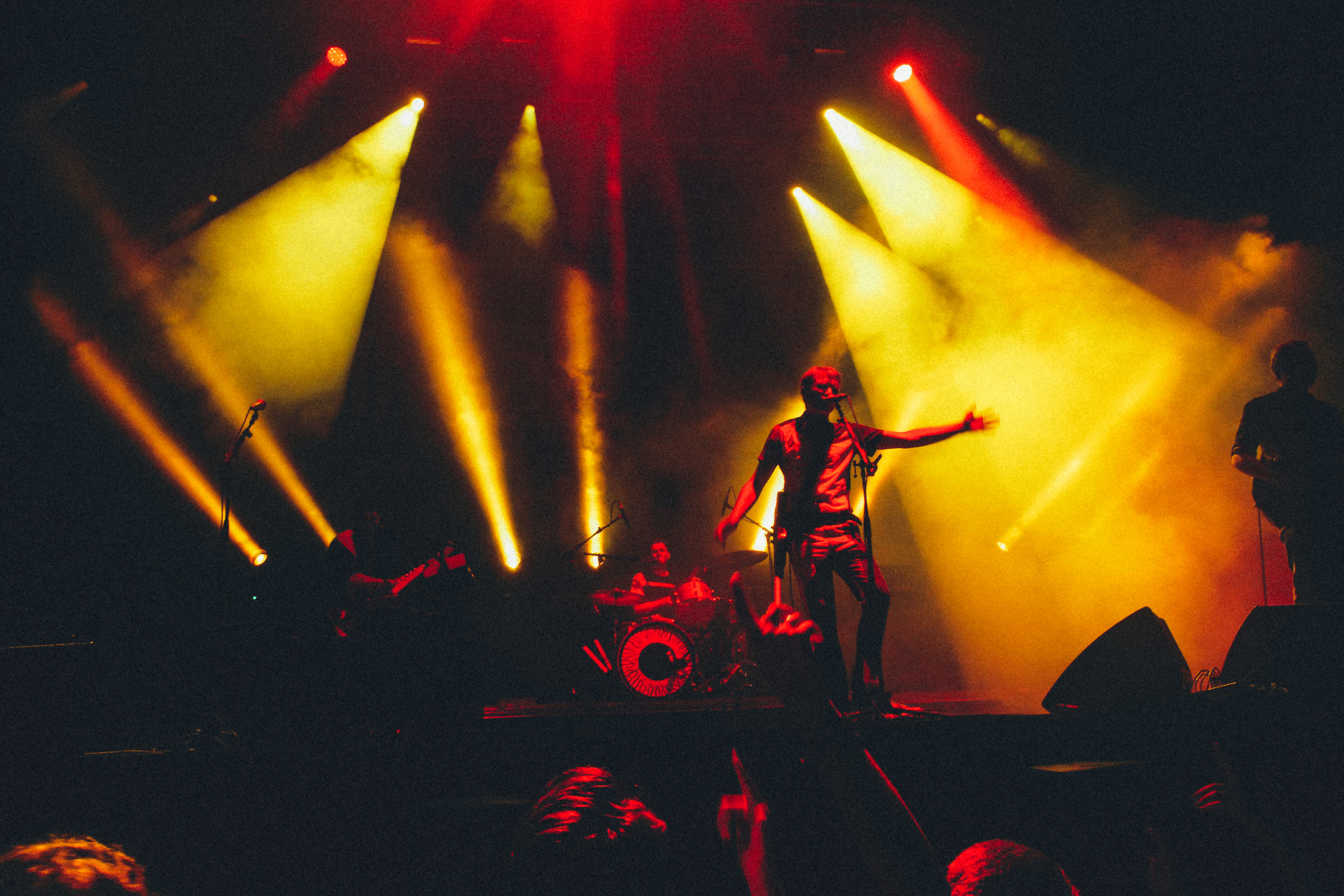
The band performing live at the 2014 Sun Festival in Málaga, Spain.

=== Singles ===
The first two singles from the album were "Right Action" and "Love Illumination". The official audio tracks for the songs were released on 27 June 2013 onto YouTube. The two songs were also released as a pink double A-side 7" single on 29 June. On 18 August 2013, an EP titled Right Action, featuring "Right Action", "Love Illumination" and two live tracks, was released digitally. To date, "Right Action" has had moderate success, reaching number 39 on the UK Indie Chart, number 28 on the US Alternative music Billboard Chart, and number 22 on the Japanese Singles Chart. The third single from the album, "Evil Eye", was released on 28 October 2013. The song received radio airplay on multiple stations, including BBC Radio 2. The fourth single to promote the album was "Bullet", released on 17 January 2014 in New Zealand, and on 20 January 2014 in the UK. "Fresh Strawberries" was digitally released as the fifth single on 4 April 2014 in Australia and New Zealand, and on 7 April 2014 in the UK. A 7" vinyl release was released on 7 May 2014, featuring a song titled "Erdbeer Mund" as the B-side, which is sung entirely in German by Nick McCarthy. The sixth single, "Stand on the Horizon", was released on 28 July 2014.

=== Music videos ===
The "Right Action" official video was released on 7 July 2013, directed by Jonas Odell, and the video for "Love Illumination" was released on 24 July 2013, directed by Tim Saccenti. On YouTube, the "Right Action" music video has received over 3 million views and the "Love Illumination" music video has received over 4 million views. The "Evil Eye" official music video was released on 8 September 2013 and was directed by Diane Martel, who is known for directing videos for various Top 3 hits such as "Blurred Lines", "Just Give Me a Reason", "We Can't Stop", and one of the bands' hit singles, "Do You Want To". The band released the official video for "Bullet" on 18 November 2013 and was directed by Andy Knowles. The official music video for "Fresh Strawberries" was released on 12 March 2014 and was directed by Margarita Louca. The official music video for "Stand on the Horizon" was released on 3 August 2014 and was directed by Karan Kandhari.

=== Concerts ===
On 20 August 2013, the band played at Electric Brixton in London, for a crowd of approximately 1,500 fans. The opening song was "Right Action" and the concert featured several songs of the new album. A concert in Glasgow followed on 21 August 2013. The band went on a world tour until the near end of 2014, performing both regular shows as well as concerts at several music festivals.

== Critical reception ==
Professional ratings
Aggregate scores
Source	Rating
Metacritic	71/100
Review scores
Source	Rating
AllMusic	4/5 stars
Alternative Press	3/5 stars
The A.V. Club	B+
The Independent	4/5 stars
Mojo	4/5 stars
NME	8/10
Pitchfork	5.4/10
Rolling Stone	3.5/5 stars
Slant Magazine	4/5 stars
Spin	8/10

Right Thoughts, Right Words, Right Action received positive reviews from music critics. On review aggregator site Metacritic, the album holds an average review score of 71/100, based on 39 reviews, indicating "generally favourable" reviews.

At Digital Spy, Adam Silverstein commends that "more often than not, Right Thoughts, Right Words, Right Action is this band sharpening their particular surefire indie to glittering distinction." Commenting on the band's future, he says that the "half-sorry, half-bitter 'Goodbye Lovers & Friends' is probably not Franz Ferdinand's very last act, even if Kapranos proclaiming in the final seconds 'But this really is the end' would make one awesome blowout. Although after delivering a record as good as this, they can take as long as they want".

At The A.V. Club, Annie Zaleski wrote positively of the musical differences between many of this album's tracks compared to the band's prior work, adding: "Admittedly, these more nuanced Right Thoughts, Right Words, Right Action sounds aren't as easily accessible; it's much easier to gravitate toward more familiar raucous post-punk ('Bullet,' 'Right Action') or the Clash-reminiscent punk-funk of 'Evil Eye.' But by expanding its worldview, Franz Ferdinand has very nicely settled onto a path toward career longevity."

Writing for Mojo, Victoria Segal says that "Franz Ferdinand remain in robust good health, athletic aesthetes who have yet to break their stride. There's no great leap forward here but the spring in their step is unmistakable. All present, all correct." At Alternative Press, Reed Fischer called the title "resolute", and said that "fortunately, his cruelty translates into charming melodies here that almost excuse the long wait for them." Conversely, Tim Stegall in The Austin Chronicle wrote: "[T]he satisfaction appears sonic alone: Not a song sticks. It's sheer style that carries this disc." Caleb Caldwell for Slant Magazine wrote:

More or less the Scottish answer to American bands like Interpol and the Strokes, Franz Ferdinand, with their du-jour cool and deft combination of insular art flair and dance-floor populism, was hailed by British hype machine New Musical Express as the dawn of a new rock revolution. The band's blue-blazered appeal, however, started to slip after 2009's overly serious concept album Tonight: Franz Ferdinand. Four years later, the zeitgeist may prefer its rock stars with suspenders and banjos, but Franz Ferdinand's Right Thoughts, Right Words, Right Action is an unapologetically swaggering disco-rock album that refuses to overstay its welcome.

== Track listing ==
All tracks are written by Alex Kapranos and Nick McCarthy, except where noted.

No.	Title	Writer(s)	Producer(s)	Length
1.	"Right Action"	Kapranos, McCarthy, Bob Hardy	Joe Goddard, Alexis Taylor	3:01
2.	"Evil Eye"		Kapranos, Todd Terje	2:47
3.	"Love Illumination"		Kapranos	3:44
4.	"Stand on the Horizon"		Kapranos, Terje	4:23
5.	"Fresh Strawberries"		Kapranos	3:21
6.	"Bullet"	Kapranos, McCarthy, Alexander Ragnew	Kapranos	2:43
7.	"Treason! Animals."		Björn Yttling	4:07
8.	"The Universe Expanded"	Kapranos, McCarthy, Hardy	Kapranos, Yttling	4:34
9.	"Brief Encounters"		Kapranos	3:09
10.	"Goodbye Lovers & Friends"		Goddard, Kapranos, Taylor	3:15
Total length:				35:04

Japanese edition bonus tracks / Passport edition bonus 12" vinyl – The North Sea
No.	Title	Writer(s)	Length
1.	"Evil Eye" (Todd Terje Extended Mix)	Kapranos, McCarthy	7:38
2.	"Stand on the Horizon" (Todd Terje Extended Mix)	Kapranos, McCarthy	8:09

Deluxe edition bonus disc – Right Notes, Right Words, Wrong Order (Live at Konk Studios, London)
No.	Title	Writer(s)	Length
1.	"Bullet"	Kapranos, McCarthy, Ragnew	2:40
2.	"No You Girls"	Hardy, Kapranos, McCarthy, Paul Thomson	3:21
3.	"Evil Eye"	Kapranos, McCarthy	2:55
4.	"Fresh Strawberries"	Kapranos, McCarthy	3:15
5.	"Right Action"	Hardy, Kapranos, McCarthy	3:05
6.	"Goodbye Lovers & Friends"	Kapranos, McCarthy	3:31
7.	"Can't Stop Feeling" (interpolates "I Feel Love" by Donna Summer)	Peter Bellotte, Hardy, Kapranos, McCarthy, Giorgio Moroder, Donna Summer, Thomson	6:03
8.	"Treason! Animals."	Kapranos, McCarthy	3:58
9.	"Love and Destroy"	Kapranos, McCarthy	2:54
10.	"Do You Want To"	Hardy, Kapranos, McCarthy, Thomson	4:14
11.	"Ulysses"	Hardy, Kapranos, McCarthy, Thomson	2:51
12.	"Love Illumination"	Kapranos, McCarthy	4:07
13.	"Stand on the Horizon"	Kapranos, McCarthy	4:14
Total length:			1:22:12

Passport Edition bonus 7-inch single – Live at Konk Studios, London
No.	Title	Writer(s)	Length
1.	"Outsiders"	Hardy, Kapranos, McCarthy, Thomson
2.	"Tell Her Tonight"	Kapranos, McCarthy

== Personnel ==
Personnel adapted from album's liner notes.

Franz Ferdinand

- Bob Hardy
- Alex Kapranos
- Nick McCarthy
- Paul Thomson

Additional musicians

- Gus Asphalt – saxophone (track 3)
- Roxanne Clifford – backing vocals (track 5)
- Daftdog – brass (track 3)
- Manuela Gernedel – backing vocals (track 5)
- Joe Goddard – backing vocals (track 10)
- Miriam Newman – backing vocals (track 5)
- Owen Pallett – strings and string arrangement (track 4)
- Alexis Taylor – keyboards and backing vocals (track 10)

Additional personnel

- Matthew Cooper – artwork
- Alex Kapranos – artwork
- Andy Knowles – photography
- Paul Thomson – artwork

Technical personnel

- Anthony Chapman – additional engineering (track 9)
- Mike Fraser – mixing (track 6)
- Dave Fridmann – mixing (track 1)
- Joe Goddard – production (tracks 1 and 10)
- Alex Kapranos – production (tracks 2–6, 8–10), pre-production (tracks 1–6, 9, and 10), and mixing (tracks 3–5, 9 and 10)
- Mike Marsh – mastering
- Lasse Mårtén – mixing (tracks 7 and 8)
- Nick McCarthy – pre-production (tracks 1–6, 9, and 10)
- Eskimo Peach – additional engineering (track 5)
- Nille Perned – engineering (tracks 7 and 8)
- Mark Ralph – engineering (tracks 1–6, 9, and 10) and mixing (tracks 3–5, 9 and 10)
- Alexis Smith – mixing (track 2)
- Hans Stenlund – engineer (tracks 7 and 8)
- Alexis Taylor – production (tracks 1 and 10)
- Todd Terje – engineering (tracks 2 and 4), mixing (tracks 2 and 4), and production (tracks 2 and 4)
- Björn Yttling – producer (tracks 7 and 8)

== Charts ==
=== Weekly charts ===
Charts (2013–14)	Peak position
Argentine Albums (CAPIF)	10
Australian Albums (ARIA)	18
Austrian Albums (Ö3 Austria)	7
Belgian Albums (Ultratop Flanders)	5
Belgian Albums (Ultratop Wallonia)	10
Canadian Albums (Billboard)	7
Danish Albums (Hitlisten)	29
Dutch Albums (Album Top 100)	3
Finnish Albums (Suomen virallinen lista)	48
French Albums (SNEP)	6
German Albums (Offizielle Top 100)	4
Italian Albums (FIMI)	15
Japanese Albums (Oricon)	12
Korean Albums (Gaon) Standard edition	40
Korean Albums (Gaon) Deluxe edition	17
Norwegian Albums (VG-lista)	21
Polish Albums (ZPAV)	11
Portuguese Albums (AFP)	15
Scottish Albums (Official Charts)	2
Spanish Albums (Promusicae)	9
Swedish Albums (Sverigetopplistan)	42
Swiss Albums (Schweizer Hitparade)	3
UK Albums (Official Charts)	6
UK Independent Albums (Official Charts)	1
US Billboard 200	24
US Top Alternative Albums (Billboard)	4
US Independent Albums (Billboard)	4
US Top Rock Albums (Billboard)	8

=== Year-end charts ===
Charts (2013)	Position
Belgian Albums (Ultratop Flanders)	146
Belgian Albums (Ultratop Wallonia)	186
French Albums (SNEP)	153

== Notes and references ==
Notes
