= ITunes Live: London Festival '09 =

iTunes Live: London Festival '09 may refer to:

- The 2009 iTunes Festival
- iTunes Live: London Festival '09 (Placebo album)
- iTunes Live: London Festival '09 (General Fiasco EP)
- iTunes Live: London Festival '09 (Kasabian EP)
- iTunes Live: London Festival '09 (Snow Patrol EP)
- iTunes Live: London Festival '09 (The Saturdays EP)
- iTunes Live: London Festival '09 (Franz Ferdinand EP)
- iTunes Live: London Festival '09 (Marina and the Diamonds EP)
- iTunes Live: London Festival '09 (The Temper Trap EP)
- iTunes Live: London Festival '09 (Sophie Ellis-Bextor EP)
- iTunes Live: London Festival '09 (La Roux EP)
