= Planetboredom =

Website

PlanetBoredom
- Website type: Entertainment website
- Website: http://www.QH2.com
- Commercial: No
- Registration: Optional

QH2.com formerly Planetboredom.net is a website which has its roots in Toronto, Ontario, Canada. Launched in the late 1990s, it was owned by Ben Lovatt.

Planetboredom.net allowed its users to submit short movies, games, pictures and view submissions from other users. The website is home to the Bored community, boredomforums.com, and is the most popular part of the website. In 2006 a point system was added which makes it possible for active members to win prizes. The site had almost 7000 registered users.

== Legal issues ==
=== PlanetBoredom vs The Church of Scientology ===
On May 2, 2006, fans of PlanetBoredom attended a free screening of "The Story of Book One" (a film about Dianetics) at the Toronto Church of Scientology. Armed with a camcorder, they documented the film and submitted it to Planetboredom. This was met with hostility from the Scientologists.

On May 9, 2006, they received their first email. It was from Ava Paquette, a woman with a long history of legal campaigns against the enemies of Scientology. The administrative team refused to remove the content and were contacted soon after by their web host. He too had received a threatening letter, and had decided to take down the video. There were no shortage of volunteers to resume the hosting, and the downtime was limited to around an hour.

The church threatened lawsuits, to which they replied: "As much as I would like to comply, but Xenu’s powers are just too strong. Im afraid I don’t have the strength to do what you ask. Perhaps if you send me one of your fantastic books, I could gain the required strength to fight Lord Xenu!" They have yet to receive any response.

== Planetboredom Network ==
The creators of Planetboredom.net have opened up many websites over the years, which have come together to form the PlanetBoredom Network. Most of these websites have a small user base, and are clones of some of the functions of planetboredom.net, like the database of videos. Others, however, have a bigger user base and function autonomous of planetboredom. Amongst the most notable of these websites are Smash Our Stuff and TorontoForums. The latter is a community website for the people residing in the Greater Toronto Area.

=== SmashOurStuff ===
PlanetBoredom's most famous production is the ongoing internet meme SmashOurStuff.com. It started in 2005 with the website SmashMyiPod.com. This website raised money via donations to purchase an iPod for the sake of destroying it right after purchase. The true purpose of this act is still unknown as it was cited as a "Social Experiment". The video was so popular, that they followed up with SmashMyXbox, SmashMyPS3, and SmashMyWii. They have already raised money for all of these items and are just awaiting the date of release.

SmashMyiPod and SmashMyXbox received a lot of media coverage (comprehensive list).

"When Apple first launched the Macintosh - its original cult product - it produced a famous 1984 Super Bowl commercial that depicted a young woman throwing a sledgehammer through a giant screen, on which a Big Brother-like face is speaking; the screen explodes, the Orwellian drones are liberated, and Apple's message to the IBM monoculture of the day came through loud and clear. We're a long way from 1984. But Victor's rubber mallet, watched by the world, should be familiar enough to make Apple squirm, just a little." – The Globe and Mail

== See also ==
- Smash Our Stuff
- Boredom
