= Covers (Franz Ferdinand EP) =

EP by Franz Ferdinand
- Released: 16 April 2011
- Genres: Indie rock; dance-punk; post-punk revival; new wave; art rock
- Length: 22:27
- Label: Domino

Franz Ferdinand chronology
Blood (2009)	Covers (2011)	Right Thoughts, Right Words, Right Action (2013)

Covers is an extended play by Scottish indie rock band Franz Ferdinand released in 2011. The entire EP consists of songs from the 2009 album Tonight: Franz Ferdinand covered by different artists.

== Overview ==
The EP was first released on 16 April 2011 for the Record Store Day on 12" vinyl and later on 2 May 2011 on CD. From five songs of the EP Franz Ferdinand perform only on the first track, "Live Alone", which is covered by Debbie Harry. Other tracks feature Stephin Merritt, LCD Soundsystem, ESG and Peaches. Several additional remixes were also released.

Franz Ferdinand themselves have previously released covers for LCD Soundsystem's "All My Friends" and Blondie's "Call Me".

== Track listing ==
All songs written by Franz Ferdinand

No.	Title	Performer	Length
1.	"Live Alone"	Debbie Harry & Franz Ferdinand	3:31
2.	"Dream Again"	Stephin Merritt	4:17
3.	"Live Alone"	LCD Soundsystem	7:28
4.	"What She Came For"	ESG	3:38
5.	"Turn It On"	Peaches	3:33
Total length:			22:27

Additional download releases

No.	Title	Performer	Length
1.	"Live Alone" (Toby Tobias Remix)	LCD Soundsystem	10:22
2.	"What She Came For" (Wild Geese Leyline Dub)	ESG	7:56
3.	"Turn It On" (Daniel Maloso Remix)	Peaches	4:43

No.	Title	Performer	Length
1.	"Live Alone" (Brennan Green Remix)	Debbie Harry, LCD Soundsystem & Franz Ferdinand	7:19
2.	"Live Alone" (dOP Remix)	Debbie Harry & Franz Ferdinand	7:47

== Personnel ==
- Franz Ferdinand – Main Performer ("Live Alone")
- Debbie Harry – Lead Vocals ("Live Alone")
- Vincent Taeger – Drums ("Live Alone")
- Alex Kapranos – Producer ("Live Alone")
- Renaud Letang – Producer, Mixing ("Live Alone")
- Barb Morrison (Super Buddha) – Vocal Producer ("Live Alone")
- Stephin Merritt – Producer, Main Performer ("Dream Again")
- Tom Rogers – Engineer ("Dream Again")
- LCD Soundsystem – Main Performer ("Live Alone")
- ESG Main – Main Performer ("What She Came For")
- Peaches – Main Performer ("Turn It On")
