= This Boy (disambiguation) =

This Boy is a song by the Beatles.

This Boy may also refer to:

- This Boy (James Morrison song), a 2006 song by James Morrison
- This Boy (Franz Ferdinand song), a 2005 song by Franz Ferdinand
- This Boy: A Memoir of a Childhood, a 2013 book by Alan Johnson
