= Right action =

Right action may refer to:

- "Right Action", a song by Franz Ferdinand
- Right action, a core precept of in the noble eightfold path of Buddhism
- Right group action, a mathematical function
