= Blood (Franz Ferdinand album) =

Remix album by Franz Ferdinand and Dan Carey
- Released: 18 April 2009
- Recorded: 2008
- Studio: Mr. Dan's Studio (London)
- Genre: Dub; dance-punk; indietronica
- Length: 38:24
- Label: Domino
- Producer: Dan Carey

Franz Ferdinand chronology
Tonight: Franz Ferdinand (2009)	Blood (2009)	Covers (2011)

Singles from Blood
- 1. "Die on the Floor/Katherine Hit Me" Released: 2009

Professional ratings
Review scores
Source	Rating
Allmusic	4/5 stars
Robert Christgau	(dud)
Pitchfork	6.4/10
Uncut	3/5 stars

Blood (stylized as Blood: Franz Ferdinand) is a remix album produced by Dan Carey, comprising dub versions of songs from Tonight: Franz Ferdinand, the third studio album by Scottish band Franz Ferdinand. It was first released as a vinyl record for Record Store Day on 18 April 2009, limited to 500 copies, through the Domino Recording Company. It was later released as a CD in June 2009.

== Origins and conception ==
Like Tonight: Franz Ferdinand, Blood is the result of Franz Ferdinand's recording sessions with producer Dan Carey in 2008. It was originally packaged in the deluxe and box-set versions of Tonight: Franz Ferdinand that were available in January 2009 in Europe only. The separately packaged version of Blood released worldwide features one additional song, "Be Afraid", which is a reworked version of "Dream Again". All of the track titles are taken from lyrics from the original songs, with the exception of "Katherine Hit Me" whose title refers to lyrics from both "No You Girls" and "Katherine Kiss Me".

The songs from Tonight that were not remixed are "Bite Hard", "Lucid Dreams", and "Katherine Kiss Me".

== Musical style ==
Talking about the album and the work of producer Dan Carey, frontman Alex Kapranos stated: "He's coming from that Jamaican perspective — there's much more space; the bass guitar leads a lot more on this record than anything else." This is in reference to the genre choice of Blood which "evolved from reggae, and centers on instrumental remixes of existing recordings".

== Track listing ==
All tracks are written by Franz Ferdinand, except for "Be Afraid" written by Franz Ferdinand and Philipp Plessmann.

No.	Title	Length
1.	"Feel the Pressure" ("What She Came For" dub version)	3:28
2.	"Die on the Floor" ("Can't Stop Feeling" dub version)	6:35
3.	"The Vaguest of Feeling" ("Live Alone" dub version)	3:50
4.	"If I Can't Have You Then Nobody Can" ("Turn It On" dub version)	3:54
5.	"Katherine Hit Me" ("No You Girls" dub version)	3:43
6.	"Backwards on My Face" ("Twilight Omens" dub version)	3:48
7.	"Feeling Kind of Anxious" ("Ulysses" dub version)	6:31
8.	"Feel the Envy" ("Send Him Away" dub version)	3:34
9.	"Be Afraid" ("Dream Again" dub version)	3:03
Total length:		38:24

iTunes bonus tracks
No.	Title	Length
10.	"No You Girls" (Vince Clarke Remix)	5:04
11.	"No You Girls" (Trentemoller Remix)	7:30
12.	"No You Girls" (The Juan MacLean Remix)	8:31
Total length:		59:09
