= Smash Our Stuff =

Online video series

Smash Our Stuff is an online video series by a Canadian group who queue to purchase a popular product, then destroy it in front of those still waiting in line. The site started as "Smash My iPod", which involves smashing an iPod in front of the waiting crew. The group claim that their performances are a social experiment, performed for the sake of entertainment.

The iPod video led to similar spin-off performances from the group, including "Smash My Xbox", "Smash My PS3", and "Smash My Wii". The money needed to purchase the items is raised by the donations of visitors to the website. Since the smashing of the Xbox360 the SmashOurStuff crew were paid by a company named Tromsolan to smash an iPod Nano, which led to a one-year ban from the Yorkdale Shopping Centre in Toronto, Ontario, Canada.

On January 16, 2007, the group's forums were closed by the administrators, due to legal issues with Apple.

In response to Apple announcing the iPhone being launched in Canada, the SmashOurStuff team destroyed an iPhone on the main stage at the Toronto Freedom Festival on May 3, 2008. In 2011 the group aimed to be the first people in their country to purchase an iPad 2, solely to destroy it.

The background song used in each of the videos is titled "The Fallen" by Franz Ferdinand, which opens with the lyrics "Just because you like to destroy all of the things that bring the idiots joy."
