= Stand on the Horizon =

Single by Franz Ferdinand

from the album Right Thoughts, Right Words, Right Action
- Released: 28 July 2014
- Recorded: 2013
- Genre: Indie rock; disco-punk; post-punk revival
- Length: 4:23
- Label: Domino
- Songwriters: Alex Kapranos; Nick McCarthy
- Producers: Alex Kapranos; Todd Terje

Franz Ferdinand singles chronology
"Fresh Strawberries" (2014)	"Stand on the Horizon" (2014)	"Johnny Delusional" (2015)

Music video
- "Stand on the Horizon" on YouTube

"Stand on the Horizon" is a song by Scottish indie rock band Franz Ferdinand. It was released as the sixth single from the band's fourth studio album, Right Thoughts, Right Words, Right Action, on 28 July 2014. The song was written by Alex Kapranos and Nick McCarthy, recorded during 2013, and produced by Kapranos and Norwegian DJ Todd Terje. The music video for the song was released on 3 August 2014, was directed by Karan Kandhari, and was posted on the band's Vevo channel on YouTube.

== Composition ==
"Stand on the Horizon" features indie rock and disco-punk. The song was written by Alex Kapranos and Nick McCarthy and produced by Kapranos and Norwegian DJ Todd Terje. The song was labeled by Kapranos as something neither Franz Ferdinand or Terje have done before. He also called the ending of the song "a beautiful, uplifting piece of music". The song is sampled over the opening credits to the U.S./Canadian situation comedy Loudermilk.

== Track listing ==
Digital download
No.	Title	Length
1.	"Stand on the Horizon"	4:23
2.	"Stand on the Horizon" (Tom Furse Extrapolation)	9:04
3.	"Stand on the Horizon" (Frankie & The Heartstrings Cover)	4:32
4.	"Stand on the Horizon" (Todd Terje Extended Mix)	8:07

== Personnel ==
Personnel adapted from the album's liner notes

Franz Ferdinand

- Alex Kapranos
- Nick McCarthy
- Bob Hardy
- Paul Thomson

Additional musicians

- Owen Pallett - strings and string arrangement

Production

- Alex Kapranos – mixing, pre-production, production
- Ch4in$ - pre-production
- Mark Ralph - engineering and mixing
- Todd Terje - engineering, mixing, and production

== Charts ==
Chart (2013)	Peak position
Belgium (Ultratip Bubbling Under Flanders)	72

== Release history ==
Region	Date	Label	Format
United Kingdom	28 July 2014	Domino	Digital download
United Kingdom	28 July 2014	Domino	CD-R
