= Sister Midnight =

2024 comedy horror film

- UK theatrical release poster
- Directed by: Karan Kandhari
- Written by: Karan Kandhari
- Produced by: Alastair Clark; Ramana Rao Rudrapati; Anna Griffin
- Starring: Radhika Apte; Ashok Pathak; Chhaya Kadam; Smita Tambe
- Cinematography: Sverre Sørdal
- Edited by: Napoleon Stratogiannakis
- Music by: Paul Banks
- Production companies: Film4; BFI; Wellington Films; Griffin Pictures
- Distributed by: Altitude Film Distribution (UK)
- Release dates: 19 May 2024 (Cannes); 14 March 2025 (UK); 30 May 2025 (India)
- Running time: 110 minutes
- Countries: United Kingdom; Sweden; India
- Language: Hindi
- Box office: $316,036

Sister Midnight is a 2024 dark comedy film directed and written by Karan Kandhari in his directorial debut. The film stars Radhika Apte as a woman who is dragged into an unhappy arranged marriage and experiences chaotic events.

The film had its world premiere at the 2024 Cannes Film Festival during its Directors' Fortnight section on 19 May 2024. It was nominated at the 78th BAFTA Awards for Outstanding Debut by a British Writer, Director or Producer. The film was released theatrically in India on 30 May 2025.

== Premise ==
A woman is transformed into a disturbing and ruthless figure after entering an arranged marriage.

== Cast ==
- Radhika Apte as Uma
- Ashok Pathak as Gopal
- Chhaya Kadam as Sheetal
- Smita Tambe as Reshma
- Subhash Chandra as Sher Singh

== Production ==
In 2022, the project received a £1.03 million production grant from the British Film Institute. The film was shot on Kodak and Panavision.

=== Filming ===
Filming took place almost entirely on location in Mumbai between February and April 2023, including slum exteriors, a purpose-built wooden shack for interior scenes, and real public spaces such as train stations and Marine Drive. A brief sequence featuring a samurai warrior was shot in Scotland.

== Release ==
Sister Midnight had its world premiere at the 2024 Cannes Film Festival, during the Directors' Fortnight section, on 19 May 2024. Prior to, sales company Protagonist Pictures boarded the film's worldwide sales. In July 2024, Altitude Film Distribution secured the film's distribution rights in the United Kingdom. In October 2024, Magnet Releasing acquired the U.S. distribution rights to the film. The film was released theatrically in India on 30 May 2025.

== Reception ==
On the review aggregator website Rotten Tomatoes, 98% of 80 critics' reviews are positive, with an average rating of 7.5/10. The website's consensus reads: "Mocking the pressures of matrimony with a sly wink, Sister Midnight is a thrilling genre-bender that's impossible to predict." Metacritic, which uses a weighted average, assigned the film a score of 75 out of 100, based on 19 critics, indicating "generally favorable" reviews. The film has been noted for its unique narrative and striking visual style, marking a significant contribution to Hindi-language independent cinema.

=== Accolades ===
Award	Date of ceremony	Category	Recipient(s)	Result	Ref.
Cannes Film Festival	25 May 2024	Caméra d'Or	Karan Kandhari	Nominated	
Fantastic Fest	24 September 2024	Next Wave – Best Feature	Karan Kandhari	Won	
Hawaii International Film Festival	12 October 2024	NETPAC Award	Karan Kandhari	Won	
Zurich Film Festival	13 October 2024	Golden Eye Award	Karan Kandhari	Nominated	
British Independent Film Awards	8 December 2024	Best Lead Performance	Radhika Apte	Nominated	
British Independent Film Awards	8 December 2024	Best Music Supervision	Kle Savidge	Nominated	
British Independent Film Awards	8 December 2024	Douglas Hickox Award (Best Debut Director)	Karan Kandhari	Nominated	
British Independent Film Awards	8 December 2024	Best Debut Screenwriter	Karan Kandhari	Nominated	
British Academy Film Awards	16 February 2025	Outstanding Debut by a British Writer, Director or Producer	Karan Kandhari	Nominated	
