= Swallow, Smile =

Single by Franz Ferdinand
- B-side: "Take Me Out (Acoustic Version)"
- Released: 2006
- Recorded: Melbourne, Australia and New York City, United States
- Genre: Post-punk revival, indie rock, dance-punk
- Length: 2:42
- Label: Domino
- Songwriter(s): Franz Ferdinand

Franz Ferdinand singles chronology
"Eleanor Put Your Boots On" (2006)	"Swallow, Smile" (2006)	"Lucid Dreams" (2008)

"Swallow, Smile" is a song by Scottish indie rock band Franz Ferdinand which was released strictly for members of the band's fan club in autumn 2006.

== Overview ==
In the early days of the band, the song was often played live, but it was dropped from set lists in 2002 because they were "unhappy with the arrangement". The song saw the release in 2006 and was printed only in the form of a 45 rpm, 7" record. Towards the end of the track, the lyrics from an earlier song "Well That Was Easy" from You Could Have It So Much Better can be heard.

The single also featured an acoustic version of the band's famous single "Take Me Out" as a b-side.

== Track listing ==
- A: "Swallow, Smile" – 2:42
- B: "Take Me Out" (Acoustic Version) – 4:25
