= Lucid Dreams (Franz Ferdinand song) =

2008 single by Franz Ferdinand

Single by Franz Ferdinand
- A-side: "No You Girls"
- Released: 19 August 2008
- Genre: Indie rock; post-punk revival; dance-punk
- Length: 3:41
- Label: Domino
- Songwriter(s): Bob Hardy; Alex Kapranos; Nick McCarthy; Paul Thomson
- Producer(s): Dan Carey

Franz Ferdinand singles chronology
"Swallow, Smile" (2006)	"Lucid Dreams" (2008)	"Ulysses" (2008)

"Lucid Dreams"

Song by Franz Ferdinand

from the album Tonight: Franz Ferdinand
- Released: 26 January 2009
- Genre: Indie rock; neo-psychedelia; art rock; synth-pop; acid techno
- Length: 7:56
- Label: Domino
- Songwriter(s): Bob Hardy; Alex Kapranos; Nick McCarthy; Paul Thomson
- Producer(s): Dan Carey

"Lucid Dreams" is a song by Scottish indie rock band Franz Ferdinand. It was originally released as a digital download single on 19 August 2008. An extended and reworked version later appeared on their third studio album, Tonight: Franz Ferdinand (2009). The song peaked at number 35 on the Canadian Hot 100.

== Single version ==
Originally only listenable through a static-covered stream on the band's website and the video game Madden NFL 09, it was released as a single through iTunes on 19 August 2008 (despite an earlier message on the band's diary having stated "it's not a single"). This version is available as an iTunes bonus track to the album and also as a B-side to "No You Girls" in a slightly different mix.

== Album version ==
The single differs from the version that appears on Tonight: Franz Ferdinand, which has been described by several reviewers as the highlight of the album. The pre-album bridge now starts the song, the chorus has been revised and the original second verse and ending are omitted. The song crossfades into a three-minute acid techno instrumental piece with about three minutes left in the song (this is used as the song's outro).

== Track listing ==
Digital download

No.	Title	Length
1.	"Lucid Dreams"	3:41

== Charts ==
Chart (2008)	Peak position
Canada (Canadian Hot 100)	35
Hot Canadian Digital Songs (Canadian Hot 100)	17
