= Bullet (Franz Ferdinand song) =

Single by Franz Ferdinand

from the album Right Thoughts, Right Words, Right Action
- Released: 17 January 2014
- Recorded: 2013
- Studio: Black Pudding (Glasgow)
- Genre: Indie rock; post-punk; surf punk; dance-punk
- Length: 2:43
- Label: Domino
- Songwriters: Alex Kapranos; Nick McCarthy; Alexander Ragnew
- Producer: Alex Kapranos

Franz Ferdinand singles chronology
"Evil Eye" (2013)	"Bullet" (2014)	"Fresh Strawberries" (2014)

Music video
- "Bullet" on YouTube

"Bullet" is a song by Scottish indie rock band Franz Ferdinand. It was released as the fourth single from the band's fourth studio album, Right Thoughts, Right Words, Right Action on 17 January 2014. The song was written by Alex Kapranos, Nick McCarthy, and Alexander Ragnew, recorded during 2013, and produced by Kapranos. The music video for the song was released on 18 November 2013, was directed by Andy Knowles, and was posted on the band's Vevo channel on YouTube.

== Track listing ==
Digital download and CD
No.	Title	Length
1.	"Bullet"	2:43

== Personnel ==
Personnel adapted from the album's liner notes

Franz Ferdinand

- Alex Kapranos
- Nick McCarthy
- Bob Hardy
- Paul Thomson

Production

- Alex Kapranos – mixing, pre-production, production
- Ch4in$ - pre-production
- Mike Fraser - mixing
- Mark Ralph - engineering

== Charts ==
Chart performance for "Bullet"
Chart (2013)	Peak position
Belgium (Ultratip Bubbling Under Flanders)	33
CIS Airplay (TopHit)	189

== Release history ==
Release history and formats for "Bullet"
Region	Date	Label	Format
New Zealand	17 January 2014	Domino	Digital download
United Kingdom	20 January 2014	Domino	Digital download, CD
