= Evil Eye (Franz Ferdinand song) =

2013 song by Franz Ferdinand

Single by Franz Ferdinand

from the album Right Thoughts, Right Words, Right Action
- Released: 28 October 2013
- Recorded: 2013
- Studio: Sausage (London)
- Genre: Indie rock; funk punk; dance-rock; ska
- Length: 2:47
- Label: Domino
- Songwriters: Alex Kapranos; Nick McCarthy
- Producers: Alex Kapranos; Todd Terje

Franz Ferdinand singles chronology
"Love Illumination" (2013)	"Evil Eye" (2013)	"Bullet" (2013)

"Evil Eye" is a song by Scottish indie rock band Franz Ferdinand. It was released as the third single from the band's fourth studio album, Right Thoughts, Right Words, Right Action, on 28 October 2013. The song was written by Alex Kapranos and Nick McCarthy, recorded during 2013, and produced by Kapranos and Todd Terje.

== Composition ==
"Evil Eye" features indie rock, funk punk, dance-rock, and ska. The song was written by Alex Kapranos and Nick McCarthy and produced by Kapranos and Norwegian DJ Todd Terje. The song is about the evil eye and all-seeing eye, which were things that Kapranos was very interested about during the recording of Right Thoughts, Right Words, Right Action.

== Music video ==
A music video for the song was released on 8 September 2013. It was directed by Diane Martel, known for her controversial video for Robin Thicke's "Blurred Lines", Miley Cyrus' "We Can't Stop", as well as her work with artists such as Mariah Carey, The White Stripes, Beyoncé, and others.

The video is a pastiche of low-budget horror films. In a press statement, Franz Ferdinand frontman Alex Kapranos called it "a gruesome blood orgy eye stab death romp wide-oh creep necro fest." Pitchfork called the video "repulsive, VHS-style clip", and Kyle McGovern of Spin magazine wrote, "the clip splices together a stomach-turning montage of gross-out footage: Blood spewing from a sink faucet, people getting butchered and dismembered, throats being cut, cannibalism, and frontman Alex Kapranos sporting a dirtbag moustache."

== Critical reception ==
Adam Silverstein of Digital Spy wrote that "'Evil Eye' soldiers on with the short, snappy stomp and delves into the psyche of a paranoiac ('It looks so clean but I can see the crawling, crawling creatures'), all via a groove that pays homage to Queen's 'Another One Bites the Dust'."

AllMusic's Heather Phares noted that "Evil Eye" is one of the songs on the album that "feel like direct descendants of the band's debut", and said that it "gives the gut-punching beats of 'Take Me Out' a campy twist with mischievous keyboards destined to make it the coolest song on the Halloween party playlist." According to Dan Stubbs of NME magazine, "there's a freshness to the sound" on "Evil Eye", and the song is "essentially Snoop Dogg's 'What's My Name?' via Rockwell's 'Somebody's Watching Me' – creepy, jumpy and as funky as James Brown's ghost."

Pitchfork's Ian Cohen wrote that "The chorus of 'Evil Eye' slinks and skulks enough to recall a time when Franz Ferdinand sounded sleazier and more dancefloor-oriented than your average rock band, but it has to fight through a verse filled with bothersome vocal filters (an indulgent byproduct of their self-production) to do so." In a similar tone, James Manning of Time Out magazine noted that "'Evil Eye' matches its big, funky strut with creepy vintage organs, while a heavily reverbed Kapranos cackles like a Hammer Horror villain."

== Track listing ==
=== CD ===
- Domino – RUG555CDP

No.	Title	Length
1.	"Evil Eye" (Radio edit)	2:47
2.	"Evil Eye" (Album version)	2:47

=== Digital download ===
- Domino – RUG555D1

Evil Eye Remixes
No.	Title	Length
1.	"Evil Eye"	2:47
2.	"Evil Eye" (Alan Braxe Remix)	4:01
3.	"Evil Eye" (Alan Braxe Dub)	3:54
4.	"Evil Eye" (The New Sins FREAK Version)	6:15
5.	"Evil Eye" (The New Sins FREAK Dub)	5:50
6.	"Evil Eye" (In Flagranti Rework)	6:26

== Personnel ==
Personnel adapted from the album's liner notes

Franz Ferdinand

- Alex Kapranos
- Nick McCarthy
- Bob Hardy
- Paul Thomson

Production

- Alex Kapranos – mixing, pre-production, production
- Ch4in$ – pre-production
- Mark Ralph – engineering
- Alexis Smith – mixing
- Todd Terje – engineering and production

== Charts ==
Chart performance for "Evil Eye"
Chart (2013)	Peak position
Belgium (Ultratip Bubbling Under Flanders)	7
Belgium (Ultratip Bubbling Under Wallonia)	37

== Release history ==
Release history and formats for "Evil Eye"
Region	Date	Label	Format	Catalogue no.
United Kingdom	28 October 2013	Domino	Digital download	RUG555D1
United Kingdom	28 October 2013	Domino	CD	RUG555CDP
