= Right Action =

Single by Franz Ferdinand

from the album Right Thoughts, Right Words, Right Action
- B-side: "Love Illumination"
- Released: 27 June 2013
- Recorded: 2013
- Studio: Club Ralph (London)
- Genre: Indie rock; post-punk; dance-rock; funk
- Length: 3:02
- Label: Domino
- Songwriters: Bob Hardy; Alex Kapranos; Nick McCarthy
- Producers: Joe Goddard; Alexis Taylor

Franz Ferdinand singles chronology
"Die on the Floor/Katherine Hit Me" (2009)	"Right Action" (2013)	"Love Illumination" (2013)

Music video
- "Right Action" on YouTube

"Right Action" is a song by Scottish indie rock band Franz Ferdinand. It was released as the lead single from their fourth studio album, Right Thoughts, Right Words, Right Action, on 27 June 2013 in the United States and 18 August 2013 in the United Kingdom. It has been described as having a catchy, funk-like guitar sound. A music video of the song, directed by Jonas Odell, was released online on 7 July and features the band performing in an environment similar to their previous video "Take Me Out" (which was also directed by Odell) as the song's lyrics also appear on the screen. The song had moderate commercial success reaching number 39 on the UK Indie Chart, number 28 on the Billboard Alternative Songs chart in the United States and Number 22 in the Billboard Japan Hot 100 Singles Chart.

== Background and release ==
The lyrics for "Right Action" were inspired by a postcard found by lead singer Alex Kapranos at a London flea market that contained the words "come home, practically all is nearly forgiven". The song was first used in the album trailer for Right Thoughts, Right Words, Right Action. On 27 June 2013, the official audio track was released on YouTube and made available for digital download. The official video for "Right Action" was released on 7 July on the band's Vevo channel. The single was also released physically as a translucent neon pink 7" double A side, with "Love Illumination" being the other single.

== In popular culture ==
The song was featured on the soundtrack album for the 2014 romantic drama film Endless Love, starring Alex Pettyfer and Gabriella Wilde. It was also used in trailers for the second season of BBC Three's Some Girls, and the first season of Drifters, broadcast by E4. It was also used in the first trailer and is part of the soundtrack for Dumb and Dumber To.

== Track listing ==
Right Action Remixes
No.	Title	Length
1.	"Right Action" (Liv Spencer Rework)	5:19
2.	"Right Action" (Liv Spencer Dub)	5:28
3.	"Right Action" (Matias Aguayo Remix)	6:36
4.	"Right Action" (Zero Set Remix)	8:53
5.	"Right Action" (Golden Teacher Remix)	5:53

Right Action / Love Illumination 7" (RUG533)
No.	Title	Lyrics	Length
1.	"Right Action"	Kapranos / McCarthy / Hardy	3:01
2.	"Love Illumination"	Kapranos / McCarthy	3:44

Right Action Digital Download
No.	Title	Lyrics	Length
1.	"Right Action"	Kapranos / McCarthy / Hardy	3:01

Right Action EP
No.	Title	Lyrics	Length
1.	"Right Action"	Kapranos / McCarthy / Hardy	3:01
2.	"Love Illumination"	Kapranos / McCarthy	3:44
3.	"Right Action" (Live)		3:05
4.	"Stand on the Horizon" (Live)	Kapranos / McCarthy	4:15

Live versions taken from Right Thoughts, Right Words, Right Action deluxe edition bonus disc, recorded at Konk Studios in London.

== Personnel ==
Personnel adapted from the album's liner notes

Franz Ferdinand

- Alex Kapranos
- Nick McCarthy
- Bob Hardy
- Paul Thomson

Production

- Alex Kapranos – mixing pre-production
- Ch4in$ – pre-production
- Dave Fridmann – mixing
- Joe Goddard – production
- Mark Ralph – engineering
- Alexis Taylor – production

== Charts ==
Chart (2013)	Peak position
Canada Rock (Billboard)	38
Japan Hot 100 (Billboard)	22
UK Indie (OCC)	39
US Rock & Alternative Airplay (Billboard)	43
US Alternative Airplay (Billboard)	28
