= Fresh Strawberries =

Single by Franz Ferdinand

from the album Right Thoughts, Right Words, Right Action
- B-side: "Erdbeer Mund"
- Released: 4 April 2014
- Recorded: 2013
- Genre: Indie rock; baroque pop; power pop
- Length: 3:17
- Label: Domino
- Songwriters: Alex Kapranos; Nick McCarthy
- Producer: Alex Kapranos

Franz Ferdinand singles chronology
"Bullet" (2014)	"Fresh Strawberries" (2014)	"Stand on the Horizon" (2014)

"Fresh Strawberries" is a song by Scottish indie rock band Franz Ferdinand. On 4 April 2014, it was released digitally as the fifth single from the band's fourth studio album Right Thoughts, Right Words, Right Action. A song titled "Erdbeer Mund" ("Strawberry Mouth" in English), sung in German by Nick McCarthy, was chosen as the single's B-side.

== Music videos ==
A music video for "Fresh Strawberries" was released onto YouTube on 12 March 2014. The black-and-white video was directed by Margarita Louca.

On 4 March 2014, a music video for the B-side "Erdbeer Mund", shot in Bavaria and directed by Nick McCarthy's sister Anna McCarthy, was also released.

== Track listing ==
Side A
No.	Title	Length
1.	"Fresh Strawberries"	3:17

Side B
No.	Title	Length
1.	"Erdbeer Mund"	2:25

== Personnel ==
Personnel adapted from the album's liner notes

Franz Ferdinand

- Alex Kapranos
- Nick McCarthy
- Bob Hardy
- Paul Thomson

Additional musicians

- Roxanne Clifford – backing vocals
- Manuel Gernedel - backing vocals
- Miriam Newman - backing vocals

Production

- Alex Kapranos – mixing, pre-production, production
- Ch4in$ - pre-production
- Eskimo Peach - additional engineering
- Mark Ralph - engineering and mixing

== Charts ==
Chart performance for "Fresh Strawberries"
Chart (2013–2014)	Peak position
Belgium (Ultratip Bubbling Under Flanders)	47
Czech Republic Modern Rock (IFPI)	5

== Release history ==
Release history and formats for "Fresh Strawberries"
Region	Date	Label	Format	Ref.
Australia	4 April 2014	Domino	Digital download	
New Zealand	4 April 2014	Domino	Digital download	
Germany	7 April 2014	Domino	Digital download	
United Kingdom	7 April 2014	Domino	Digital download	
United Kingdom	2 May 2014	Domino	CD-R	
United Kingdom	6 May 2014	Domino	7"	
