= Can't Stop Feeling =

Single by Franz Ferdinand

from the album Tonight: Franz Ferdinand
- B-side: "All My Friends"
- Released: 6 July 2009
- Recorded: 2008
- Genre: Indie rock; dance-punk; new wave; funk rock
- Length: 3:03
- Label: Domino
- Songwriter(s): Bob Hardy; Alex Kapranos; Nick McCarthy; Paul Thomson
- Producer(s): Dan Carey; Franz Ferdinand

Franz Ferdinand singles chronology
| "No You Girls" (2009) | "Can't Stop Feeling" (2009) | "What She Came For" (2009) |

Alternative cover

Music video
- Can't Stop Feeling on YouTube

"Can't Stop Feeling" is a song by Scottish indie rock band Franz Ferdinand. It was released as the third single from their third studio album, Tonight: Franz Ferdinand (2009), on 6 July 2009.

The song failed to chart in the United Kingdom, this becoming the first Franz Ferdinand single not to chart the UK top 100. In France, however, the song debuted at #79 in the French top 100 Singles Charts. It spent another 1 week on the chart giving the song a total of 2 weeks.

== History ==
"Can't Stop Feeling" first surfaced as one of the songs recorded at 'The Chateau' (the band's earliest practice area) in 2003. It was tipped to be released as a single in 2004 but, as it didn't appear on the album Franz Ferdinand, was dismissed in favour of "Michael".

The song was played live on few occasions on the band's early tours. It was also played on their 2005-2006 world tour. It was then resurrected with different instrumentation in 2007 as the band road tested new songs for possible inclusion onto their third album. After December 2007, it was dropped from their live performances.

The song was finally released on the album Tonight: Franz Ferdinand in 2009, again with different instrumentation and announced to be the album's third single on 20 May 2009. The album/single version was given its live debut on 3 July the same year, a mere 3 days before its release. A redub version entitled "Die on the Floor" was released on the compilation album Blood: Franz Ferdinand.

For the band's summer 2012 tour the instrumental parts were changed again with a section of the Donna Summer's song "I Feel Love" included in the song, as well as the theme "Overture" of the musical Jesus Christ Superstar by Andrew Lloyd Webber and Tim Rice. This extended six-minute version of the song, recorded live at Konk Studios in London, was included on the Deluxe Edition of their 2013 album Right Thoughts, Right Words, Right Action.

== Music video ==
A music video was created for the song and uploaded on YouTube on 1 July 2009 by the band's record label's official YouTube page.

The video features all four members of the band. It shows the band in Glasgow, Scotland (the band's home city). It also features the band pushing the scenes away as they do so themselves.

== Critical reception ==
The Daily Music Guide gave the song an overall 4/5.

== Track listing ==
7"

1. "Can't Stop Feeling" – 2:55
2. "All My Friends" (LCD Soundsystem cover) (Murphy / Mahoney / Pope) – 5:25

Additional download tracks

1. "Can't Stop Feeling" (Emperor Machine Remix) – 8:03
2. "Can't Stop Feeling" (Emperor Machine Instrumental) – 7:57
3. "Can't Stop Feeling" (Who Made Who Remix) – 5:45

== Charts ==
| Chart (2009) | Peak position |
|---|---|
| French Top 100 | 69 |
| Italian Singles Charts | 47 |
| Switzerland Airplay (Schweizer Hitparade) | 84 |
