= Late Night Tales: Franz Ferdinand =

Compilation album by Franz Ferdinand
- Released: 15 September 2014
- Genre: Electronic, pop, rock, folk, psychedelic, experimental, spoken word
- Length: 67:12
- Label: Night Time Stories
- Producer: Franz Ferdinand
- Compiler: Franz Ferdinand

Franz Ferdinand chronology
Right Thoughts, Right Words, Right Action (2013)	Late Night Tales: Franz Ferdinand (2014)	FFS (2015)

Late Night Tales chronology
Late Night Tales Presents After Dark: Nightshift (2014)	Late Night Tales: Franz Ferdinand (2014)	Late Night Tales presents Automatic Soul (2014)

Late Night Tales: Franz Ferdinand is a compilation album compiled by Scottish band Franz Ferdinand, released on 15 September 2014 as part of the Late Night Tales series. The mix includes tracks from artists such as R. Stevie Moore, Lee "Scratch" Perry, James Brown, Paul McCartney & Wings and Boards of Canada. It also features an exclusive Franz Ferdinand cover version of Jonathan Halper’s "Leaving My Old Life Behind".

== Track listing ==
No.	Title	Artist(s)	Length
1.	"Leaving My Old Life Behind"	Franz Ferdinand	3:40
2.	"I'm Only Sleeping"	R. Stevie Moore	3:05
3.	"Eighteen Is Over The Hill"	The West Coast Pop Art Experimental Band	2:42
4.	"Let There Be Drums"	Sandy Nelson	2:16
5.	"New Town"	Life Without Buildings	5:53
6.	"Connection"	Can	2:59
7.	"The Darkside"	The Liminanas	1:55
8.	"Reasons To Be Cheerful Part 3"	Ian Dury	6:38
9.	"For The Love Of Money"	Disco Dub Band	4:06
10.	"More Bounce To The Ounce"	Zapp	5:11
11.	"Requiem Pour Un Con"	Serge Gainsbourg	2:49
12.	"Disco Devil"	Lee "Scratch" Perry	7:52
13.	"King Heroin"	James Brown	3:57
14.	"Love Will Set You Free"	Carrie Cleveland	5:47
15.	"Nineteen Hundred & Eighty Five"	Paul McCartney & Wings	5:31
16.	"Reach For The Dead"	Boards of Canada	4:47
17.	"Zebra"	Oneohtrix Point Never	6:44
18.	"Old Man"	Justus Köhncke	3:24
19.	"Sweet Mountain"	American Spring	4:13
20.	"Defibrillator"	Alex Kapranos	7:53
Total length:			67:12
