= Walk Away (Franz Ferdinand song) =

2005 single by Franz Ferdinand

Single by Franz Ferdinand

from the album You Could Have It So Much Better
- B-side: "Sexy Boy"
- Released: 5 December 2005
- Genre: Indie rock
- Length: 3:36
- Label: Domino
- Songwriters: Robert Hardy; Alex Kapranos; Nick McCarthy; Paul Thomson
- Producer: Rich Costey

Franz Ferdinand singles chronology
"Do You Want To" (2005)	"Walk Away" (2005)	"The Fallen" / "L. Wells" (2006)

Music video
- "Walk Away" on YouTube

"Walk Away" is a song by Scottish rock band Franz Ferdinand and is featured on their second album, You Could Have It So Much Better. It was released 5 December 2005 as the second single from that album in the United Kingdom, entering the UK Singles Chart at number 13 a week later.

== Track listings ==
All tracks were written by Franz Ferdinand, except where noted.

7-inch (RUG215)

1. "Walk Away" – 3:36
2. "The Fallen" (acoustic version) – 2:44

CD (RUG215CD)

1. "Walk Away" – 3:36
2. "Sexy Boy" (Air cover) (Jean-Benoît Dunckel, Nicolas Godin) – 3:40

DVD (RUG215DVD)

1. "Walk Away" (video)
2. "Walk Away" (making of video)
3. "This Boy" (live in Edinburgh)

2011 digital reissue (DOMDIG009)

1. "Walk Away" – 3:36
2. "The Fallen" (acoustic version) – 2:44
3. "Sexy Boy" (Air cover) (Dunckel, Godin) – 3:40
4. "Walk Away" (acoustic version) – 3:38

== Personnel ==
- Artwork By [Design] – Matthew Cooper
- Artwork By [Photography] – Mads Perch-Nielsen
- Engineer – Carl Granville
- Mixed By – Parker*
- Producer – Franz Ferdinand, Rich Costey (tracks: 1)

== Charts ==
Chart (2005–2006)	Peak position
Belgium (Ultratip Bubbling Under Flanders)	8
Germany (GfK)	96
Ireland (IRMA)	46
Netherlands (Single Top 100)	84
Scotland Singles (OCC)	9
Switzerland Airplay (Schweizer Hitparade)	69
UK Singles (OCC)	13
UK Indie (OCC)	3
Ukraine Airplay (TopHit)	83
