= Eleanor Put Your Boots On =

Single by Franz Ferdinand

from the album You Could Have It So Much Better
- B-side: "Wine in the Afternoon"; "Ghost in a Ditch"
- Released: 17 July 2006
- Recorded: 2006 (new version)
- Studio: Benton Harbor, Michigan (new version)
- Length: 2:49 (album version); 3:12 (single version)
- Label: Domino
- Songwriter(s): Alex Kapranos; Nick McCarthy
- Producer(s): Rich Costey

Franz Ferdinand singles chronology
"The Fallen" / "L. Wells" (2006)	"Eleanor Put Your Boots On" (2006)	"Swallow, Smile" (2006)

"Eleanor Put Your Boots On" is a song by Scottish indie rock band Franz Ferdinand. It was released as the fourth single from their second album, You Could Have It So Much Better, on 17 July 2006. The single version of the song is a new version that was recorded in Benton Harbor, Michigan during their 2006 tour with Death Cab for Cutie. Promotion for the single included two videos: one for "Eleanor Put Your Boots On" and one for B-side "Wine in the Afternoon" (recorded at Trama Studios, São Paulo, Brazil), making the B-side a video-clip-only single. It reached number 30 on the UK Singles Chart.

== Overview ==
Steve Lamacq first played the new version of the song on his BBC Radio show, Lamacq Live in the last week of May 2006. Shortly thereafter, an interview appeared with the band in Nylon Magazine where they confirmed the recording of a new version of the song for release as a single.

The 'Eleanor' in the title is thought to refer to Eleanor Friedberger, lead singer of indie rock band The Fiery Furnaces who supported Franz Ferdinand during their 2004 tour. Friedberger used to have a relationship with Franz Ferdinand lead singer Alex Kapranos.

== Track listings ==
All tracks were written by Alex Kapranos and Nick McCarthy except where noted.

7-inch (RUG234)

1. "Eleanor Put Your Boots On" – 3:12
  - New recording
2. "Wine in the Afternoon" (Kapranos) – 4:23

7-inch (RUG234X)

1. "Eleanor Put Your Boots On" – 3:12
  - New recording
2. "Ghost in a Ditch" (McCarthy) – 3:45
  - Vocals performed by McCarthy

CD (RUG234CD)

1. "Eleanor Put Your Boots On" – 3:12
  - New recording
2. "Ghost in a Ditch" (McCarthy) – 3:45
  - Vocals performed by McCarthy
3. "Fade Together" (Avalanches Remix) – 3:50

Digital download (DOMDIG011)

1. "Eleanor Put Your Boots On" – 3:12
  - New recording
2. "Ghost in a Ditch" (McCarthy) – 3:45
  - Vocals performed by McCarthy
3. "Fade Together" (Avalanches Remix) – 3:50
4. "Wine in the Afternoon" (Kapranos) – 4:23

== Charts ==
Chart performance for "Eleanor Put Your Boots On"
Chart (2006)	Peak position
Scotland (OCC)	17
UK Singles (OCC)	30
UK Indie (OCC)	1
