= Love Illumination =

2013 song by Franz Ferdinand

Single by Franz Ferdinand

from the album Right Thoughts, Right Words, Right Action
- A-side: "Right Action"
- Released: 27 June 2013
- Recorded: 2013
- Studio: Sausage (London)
- Genre: Indie rock; dance-rock; new wave; glam rock; funk
- Length: 3:44
- Label: Domino
- Songwriters: Alex Kapranos; Nick McCarthy
- Producer: Alex Kapranos

Franz Ferdinand singles chronology
"Right Action" (2013)	"Love Illumination" (2013)	"Evil Eye" (2013)

Music video
- "Love Illumination" on YouTube

"Love Illumination" is a song by Scottish indie rock band Franz Ferdinand. It was released as the second single from the band's fourth studio album, Right Thoughts, Right Words, Right Action, on 27 June 2013.

In 2015, an arrangement by Derek Williams of Love Illumination performed by Calma Carmona with the orchestra of Scottish Opera was used under licence by Glenfiddich distillery to promote the relaunch of their 21yo single malt. The video gained more than 1.7 million hits on YouTube.

== Composition ==
"Love Illumination" features indie rock, dance-rock, new wave, glam rock, and funk. Nick McCarthy stated that he originally thought the guitar riff, conceived by Alex Kapranos, was "too rocky", but later enjoyed playing it. The song was written and recorded during a weekend session at McCarthy's Sausage Studio. About the song's meaning, Kapranos stated:

We all feel as sensitive to satisfaction at times. We can look outside us and see nothing but destruction, avarice, and boredom. So we look to find that love where we can find it. Some people look to Hollywood, some people look to Blackpool and the bright lights of Blackpool. That's probably where I would look.

== Music video ==
The music video for the song was released on 24 July 2013 onto the band's Vevo channel on YouTube. It was directed by Tim Saccenti. The video features psychedelic transitions between clips, band members with animal masks and people dancing randomly with some references of Triadisches Ballett from Buahaus.

== Critical reception ==
The song's lyrics have been described as "a cheeky testament to their writing abilities". The video was called "self-consciously odd" by Sarah Bella.

== Track listing ==
Digital download

1. "Love Illumination" (Kapranos / McCarthy) - 3:44

7" (RUG533)

1. "Right Action" (Alex Kapranos / Nick McCarthy / Robert Hardy) - 3:01
2. "Love Illumination" (Kapranos / McCarthy) - 3:44

UK digital download

1. "Right Action" (Kapranos / McCarthy / Hardy) - 3:01
2. "Love Illumination" (Kapranos / McCarthy) - 3:44
3. "Right Action" (Live) (Kapranos / McCarthy / Hardy) - 3:05
4. "Stand on the Horizon" (Live) (Kapranos / McCarthy) - 4:14
- Live versions taken from Right Thoughts, Right Words, Right Action deluxe edition bonus disc

== Personnel ==
Personnel adapted from the album's liner notes

Franz Ferdinand

- Alex Kapranos
- Nick McCarthy
- Bob Hardy
- Paul Thomson

Additional musicians

- Gus Asphalt - saxophone
- Daftdog - brass

Production

- Alex Kapranos – mixing, pre-production, production
- Ch4in$ - pre-production
- Mark Ralph - engineering and mixing

== Charts ==
Chart performance for "Love Illumination"
Chart (2013)	Peak position
Belgium (Ultratip Bubbling Under Flanders)	22
Belgium (Ultratip Bubbling Under Wallonia)	31
France (SNEP)	148
Portugal (AFP)	49
Switzerland Airplay (Schweizer Hitparade)	80
