= What She Came For =

Single by Franz Ferdinand

from the album Tonight: Franz Ferdinand
- Released: 31 August 2009
- Recorded: 2008
- Genre: Indie rock; dance-punk; new wave
- Length: 3:52
- Label: Domino
- Songwriters: Bob Hardy; Alex Kapranos; Nick McCarthy; Paul Thomson
- Producers: Dan Carey; Franz Ferdinand

Franz Ferdinand singles chronology
"Can't Stop Feeling" (2009)	"What She Came For" (2009)	"Die on the Floor/Katherine Hit Me" (2009)

"What She Came For" is the fourth single from the album Tonight: Franz Ferdinand by Franz Ferdinand. It was remixed as "Feel the Pressure" for the band's remix album, Blood: Franz Ferdinand.

== Background ==
"What She Came For" originated from the song "Favourite Lie", which was played live in 2007 by the band and featured similarities in arrangement and lyrics.

== Track listing ==
Digital download

1. "What She Came For" – 3:33

Vinyl Remixes EP

1. "What She Came For" (Drums of Death Remix) – 4:18
2. "What She Came For" (Tigerstyle Remix) – 3:28
3. "What She Came For" (Lee Mortimer Vocal Remix) – 6:24
4. "What She Came For" (Lee Mortimer Dub) – 6:25

"Feel the Pressure" digital download

1. "Feel the Pressure" – 3:28

== Remixes ==
The song has been remixed by:

- Drums of Death
- Tigerstyle
- Lee Mortimer
- Mr Dan (remix called "Feel the Pressure" for the remix album Blood: Franz Ferdinand)
