= The Fallen (song) =

2006 single by Franz Ferdinand

Single by Franz Ferdinand

from the album You Could Have It So Much Better
- A-side: "L. Wells"
- B-side: "Jeremy Fraser"; "Brown Onions"
- Released: 20 February 2006
- Length: 3:42 (album version); 2:49 (radio edit)
- Label: Domino
- Songwriters: Alex Kapranos; Nick McCarthy
- Producer: Rich Costey

Franz Ferdinand singles chronology
"Walk Away" (2005)	"The Fallen" / "L. Wells" (2006)	"Eleanor Put Your Boots On" (2006)

"The Fallen" is a song by Scottish indie rock band Franz Ferdinand. It was released as the third single from their second studio album, You Could Have It So Much Better (2005), on 20 February 2006 in Australia and on 3 April 2006 in the United Kingdom as a double A-side with new song "L. Wells". The single peaked at number four on the Scottish Singles Chart and number 14 on the UK Singles Chart.

== Composition ==
The lyrics for "The Fallen" borrow heavily from New Testament miracles; with references to the feeding of the five-thousand, the Virgin Mary, Mary Magdalene and the turning of water into wine. Biblical references can also be seen in the song "Auf Achse", from Franz Ferdinand's first album, which references crucifixion; this interest in the Bible and Christianity appear to stem from Kapranos' brief study of theology at the University of Aberdeen before he dropped out.

== Track listings ==
All tracks were written by Alex Kapranos and Nick McCarthy except where noted.

- 7-inch 1 (RUG219)
1. "The Fallen" (album version) – 3:42
2. "L. Wells" (Alex Kapranos) – 3:31
- 7-inch 2 (RUG219X)
1. "The Fallen" (Remixed by Justice) – 3:55
2. "L. Wells" (Alex Kapranos) – 3:31
3. "Brown Onions" (Franz Ferdinand) – 3:02
  - Instrumental
- CD (RUG219CD)
1. "The Fallen" (radio edit) – 2:49
2. "The Fallen" (Remixed by Justice) – 3:55
3. "L. Wells" (Alex Kapranos) – 3:31
4. "Jeremy Fraser" (Nick McCarthy) – 3:57
  - Vocals performed by Nick McCarthy.
5. "The Fallen" (video) – 2:49
- 12-inch (RUG219T2)
1. "The Fallen" (Remixed by Justice) – 3:55
2. "The Fallen" (album version) – 3:42
3. "Do You Want To" (Max Tundra remix) – 4:35
4. "Do You Want To" (Max Tundra remix – instrumental) – 4:22
- Australian CD (82876788592)
1. "The Fallen" (album version) – 3:42
2. "Sexy Boy" (Jean-Benoît Dunckel, Nicolas Godin) – 3:40
  - Air cover, released in the UK on the "Walk Away" single.
3. "The Fallen" (acoustic version) – 2:44
4. "Do You Want To" (Erol Alkan remix) – 7:41
  - Errors in the liner notes stating that all tracks were written by Franz Ferdinand and omitting that track number three is an acoustic version.

== Charts ==
Chart (2006)	Peak position
Australia (ARIA)	51
Ireland (IRMA)	41
Netherlands (Single Top 100)	91
Scotland Singles (OCC)	4
UK Singles (OCC)	14
UK Indie (OCC)	1
Ukraine Airplay (TopHit)	193
US Alternative Airplay (Billboard)	39

== Release history ==
Region	Date	Format(s)	Label(s)	Ref.
Australia	20 February 2006	CD	Domino	
United Kingdom	3 April 2006	CD	Domino	
United Kingdom	8 May 2006	12-inch vinyl	Domino	
