= No You Girls =

Single by Franz Ferdinand

from the album Tonight: Franz Ferdinand
- B-side: "Lucid Dreams"; Remixes
- Released: 6 April 2009
- Recorded: 2008
- Genre: Indie rock; dance-punk; funk rock; new wave
- Length: 3:42 (album version); 3:22 (radio mix)
- Label: Domino
- Songwriters: Bob Hardy; Alex Kapranos; Nick McCarthy; Paul Thomson
- Producers: Dan Carey; Franz Ferdinand

Franz Ferdinand singles chronology
"Ulysses" (2008)	"No You Girls" (2009)	"Can't Stop Feeling" (2009)

Alternative cover

Music video
- No You Girls on YouTube

"No You Girls" is a song by Scottish indie rock band Franz Ferdinand. It was released as the second single from their third album, Tonight: Franz Ferdinand (2009), on 6 April 2009. The song received worldwide attention after being chosen for use in an iPod advertisement. It charted in several countries, including the UK, where it peaked at number 22, and the U.S., where it peaked at number 106.

== History ==
The track was debuted live on 5 August 2007 under the title "Katherine Kiss Me" but was subsequently changed little over a year later to "No You Girls Never Know" and then shortened, while a new, acoustic song called "Katherine Kiss Me" (following very similar lyrics to "No You Girls") was recorded for the album Tonight: Franz Ferdinand.

The song is inspired by Alex Kapranos' first time he ever kissed a girl (whose name was Katherine) and "how awkward it was and how we misunderstood each other". "No You Girls" is how the story would be exaggerated or told as an anecdote and "Katherine Kiss Me" is about how it would be remembered more affectionately.

Human bones were used for some of the percussion in the song. Kapranos had bought a box of junk with a skeleton at an auction to use as studio decorations, and during the recording of this song, they experimented using femur bones for a "clicky sort of sound". "The femur sounds are most pronounced near the end of the song," Kapranos wrote. Nowadays, he regrets this decision.

== Release ==
"No You Girls" reached #22 in the UK Singles Chart two weeks before its official release, dropped to #24 the next week and then returned to #22 upon its official release. Although it, therefore, did not fulfill its expectations before its physical release, it became the band's second longest lasting single (after "Do You Want To") in the UK Top 100, remaining there for ten weeks. It remains their last song to reach the UK Top 40. Recently the song's intro was used in an episode of the TV show, Fringe, titled "Unleashed" and a part of the chorus was used during a party scene in the 2009 movie Sorority Row.

The single release featured remixes from Vince Clarke, Noze and John Disco. The single was produced by Dan Carey and the band as part of the album sessions which took place at the band’s own HQ in Govan, Glasgow and Carey’s South London studio. The vinyl release of "No You Girls" features a slightly retouched version of the original "Lucid Dreams" called the "Mike Frazer Mix".

The song was used to promote the 9th season of the teen drama Degrassi: The Next Generation.

A slightly different edit of the song was sent to radio, mixed by Cenzo Townshend.

== Awards and nominations ==
The song was nominated for Best Remixed Recording, Non-Classical at the 52nd Grammy Awards. It was remixed by the Danish artist Trentemøller.

== Music video ==
The music video was released on Friday 13 March, the same night the band performed it for Comic Relief. The music video itself, directed by Nima Nourizadeh in his final music video to date, features various girls with large dresses dancing around the band while they perform the track, as well as machines spitting out papers with the word "NO" written on them.

== Track listing ==
CD

1. "No You Girls"
2. "No You Girls" (Vince Clarke remix)

CD – German / Australian issue

1. "No You Girls"
2. "No You Girls" (Vince Clarke remix) – 5:07
3. "No You Girls" (John Disco reversion – original Vox) – 4:01
4. "No You Girls" (Nôze remix) – 7:08
5. "No You Girls" (The Grizzl remix) – 6:52

7-inch (limited)

1. "No You Girls"
2. "Lucid Dreams (Mike Frazer mix)"

12-inch

1. "No You Girls" (Nôze remix)
2. "No You Girls" (John Disco remix)
3. "No You Girls" (Raffertie remix)
4. "Ulysses" (Zomby remix)

CD promo

1. "No You Girls" (Radio mix) – 3:22
2. "No You Girls" – 3:42
3. "No You Girls" (Vince Clarke remix) – 5:07

== Credits ==
- Artwork by Franz Ferdinand, Matthew Cooper
- Engineers – Alexis Smith, Paul Savage
- Engineer (technical assistance) – Allen Johnston
- Mastered by John Dent
- Mastered at Loud Mastering.
- Mixed at the Warehouse Studio, Vancouver.
- Mixed by Mike Fraser, (assisted by Eric Mosher)
- Photography by Joe Dilworth
- Producer by Dan Carey, Franz Ferdinand
- Recorded by Dan Carey, Franz Ferdinand
- Remixed by Cenzo Townshend (track 1 on CD promo)
- Written by Franz Ferdinand

== Charts ==
=== Weekly charts ===
Weekly chart performance for "No You Girls"
Chart (2009)	Peak position
Australia (ARIA)	34
Canada (Canadian Hot 100)	54
Japan (Japan Hot 100)	39
UK Singles (OCC)	22
US Bubbling Under Hot 100 (Billboard)	6
US Alternative Airplay (Billboard)	7
US Hot Rock & Alternative Songs (Billboard)	18

=== Year-end charts ===
Year-end chart performance for "No You Girls"
Chart (2009)	Position
US Alternative Songs (Billboard)	18
US Hot Rock Songs (Billboard)	46
