= Tonight: Franz Ferdinand =

2009 album by Franz Ferdinand

Studio album by Franz Ferdinand
- Released: 26 January 2009
- Recorded: 17 April – 20 September 2008
- Studios: Govan Town Hall (Govan); Mr. Dan's Studio (London)
- Genres: Indie rock; dance-punk; new wave; electropop; art rock
- Length: 42:45
- Label: Domino
- Producers: Dan Carey; Franz Ferdinand

Franz Ferdinand chronology
You Could Have It So Much Better (2005)	Tonight: Franz Ferdinand (2009)	Blood (2009)

Singles from Tonight: Franz Ferdinand
- 1. "Ulysses" Released: 2 December 2008; 2. "No You Girls" Released: 6 April 2009; 3. "Can't Stop Feeling" Released: 6 July 2009; 4. "What She Came For" Released: 31 August 2009; 5. "Live Alone" Released: 13 November 2009

Tonight: Franz Ferdinand (also known as Tonight) is the third studio album by Scottish indie rock band Franz Ferdinand, released on 26 January 2009 through the Domino Recording Company. In contrast to their speedily-recorded second studio album, You Could Have It So Much Better (2005), the band chose to take some time off before recording a new album. Writing sessions began in early 2007 and recording took place in 2008 at the town hall of Govan, Scotland, and producer Dan Carey's studio in South London.

Tonight is a concept album loosely based around a night of partying and the morning effects after. The album has more of a dance-oriented sound, featuring dance-punk, new wave, and electropop throughout, marking a departure from the band's post-punk sound, which was prominently featured on their past two albums. They also took inspiration from dub music and the music of Jamaica and Africa while recording. The cover art was inspired by 1940s and 50s crime scene photographs, particularly ones taken by New York City-based photographer Weegee.

Tonight received generally favourable reviews from music critics and had a positive commercial performance, peaking at number two on the UK Albums Chart, number nine on the US Billboard 200, and charting in the top ten in several other countries. Five official singles were released to promote the album: "Ulysses", "No You Girls", "Can't Stop Feeling", "What She Came For", and "Live Alone". A remix album composed of dub versions of most tracks from Tonight, titled Blood, was released on 18 April 2009.

== Background and recording ==
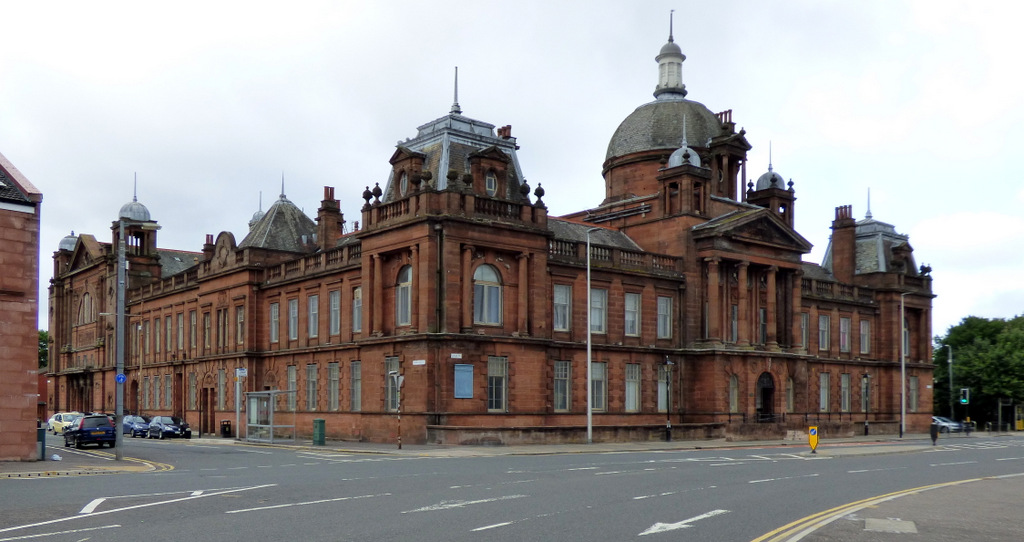
The out-of-use Govan Town Hall was used by the band as a recording studio

Although having written about eight songs while on tour in 2005, Alex Kapranos and Nick McCarthy decided to write new music because they wanted the album to be "...quite new, to be quite different sounding from everything we've ever done before." Despite having recorded their second album in a short amount of time, Kapranos stressed that the band wanted to take their time. He voices, "This time we wanted to spend more time developing, and also, I suppose, allowing songs and sounds to evolve more before we ended up writing an album, and absorbing more music and ideas and, I suppose, life itself. And when I say life, I mean life off the road, because I wouldn't classify life on the road as real life."

Franz Ferdinand began working on Tonight in early 2007. Franz Ferdinand was supposed to record the album with producer Brian Higgins, yet in March 2008, the two entities parted ways. The drummer, Paul Thomson, says "We wrote with Higgins for a while and initially we thought we'd work more with him but it didn't really work out. We just realized that we're not really a pop group." However, they also commented they have not given up on the pop concept. The songs on the album were written and recorded at the town hall of Govan, Scotland, and Dan Carey's studio in South London. The band first moved into Govan's town hall following a year of touring in support of their second studio album and mostly used it for storing and rehearsing. Recording sessions for the album began on 17 April 2008.

== Composition ==
Tonight is a concept album that explores the highs and lows associated with an evening of debauchery, as stated by a critic on online publication Ventvox. "This album covers all its bases from the initial excitement of the early evening to the numbness of the morning after", writes the reviewer. The line "come on, let's get high" from "Ulysses", the album's first track, reveals this theme. Kapranos described the album as "like a night out", with "Ulysses" being "the sound of psyching yourself up for it" and "Lucid Dreams" serving as the climax of the night. The album has been influenced by non-British music. It has been inspired by the "heavy dub sound of Jamaican reggae stars" and has "the heavy bass and space echo you would find on a dub mix." The album also has somewhat of an African influence. Alex Kapranos stated in an XFM article that "We're one of these bands that are always gonna sound the same no matter what we do, but there are other influences there. I guess the drums are a little different, Paul has been listening to a lot of African stuff so that's gonna come through."

Musically, Tonight has been described as indie rock, dance-punk, new wave, electropop, and art rock. In a profile written about the album, The New York Times writer Melena Ryzik wrote that the album's sound was "aimed away from the wry, propulsive post-punk that defined [the band's] first two records". Kapranos stated in an interview with Billboard that the album is "the opposite of punk/pop, which took something that was wonderful and removed all the dirt." He also said that the band was using Russian Polyvox synthesizers. He also stated, in a Rolling Stone interview, that the album is more of a dance than a rock record. A song on the album previously known as "Kiss Me", presumably re-titled "No You Girls", uses a human skeleton for percussion, to which The Guardian jokingly, in response, asked "Have Glasgow's finest gone all goth on us? What next? Zombie hunting? Gigs at the necropolis?"

== Packaging ==
The artwork for the album is a photograph taken by Søren Solkær Starbird just after midnight behind the Barrowlands Ballroom in Glasgow. Talking to NME, drummer Paul Thomson said, "We wanted to get a Weegee vibe – that famous New York crime scene photographer from the '40s and '50s". Subsequently, it is part of a series where the band are taking photos with photographers in different cities they end up in. On the band's blog, they mention the series of photos as 'imaginary crime scenes, invaded by the photographer', and 'a slice of night frozen by flash'.

It was announced on 20 September 2008 that they had finished work on the album but still had no title for it. On 7 October 2008, reporter Michael Hogan from Vanity Fair interviewed Alex and Paul, who confirmed the title of their third album to be Tonight, with NME reporting the album's full title and release date a week later.

== Promotion and release ==
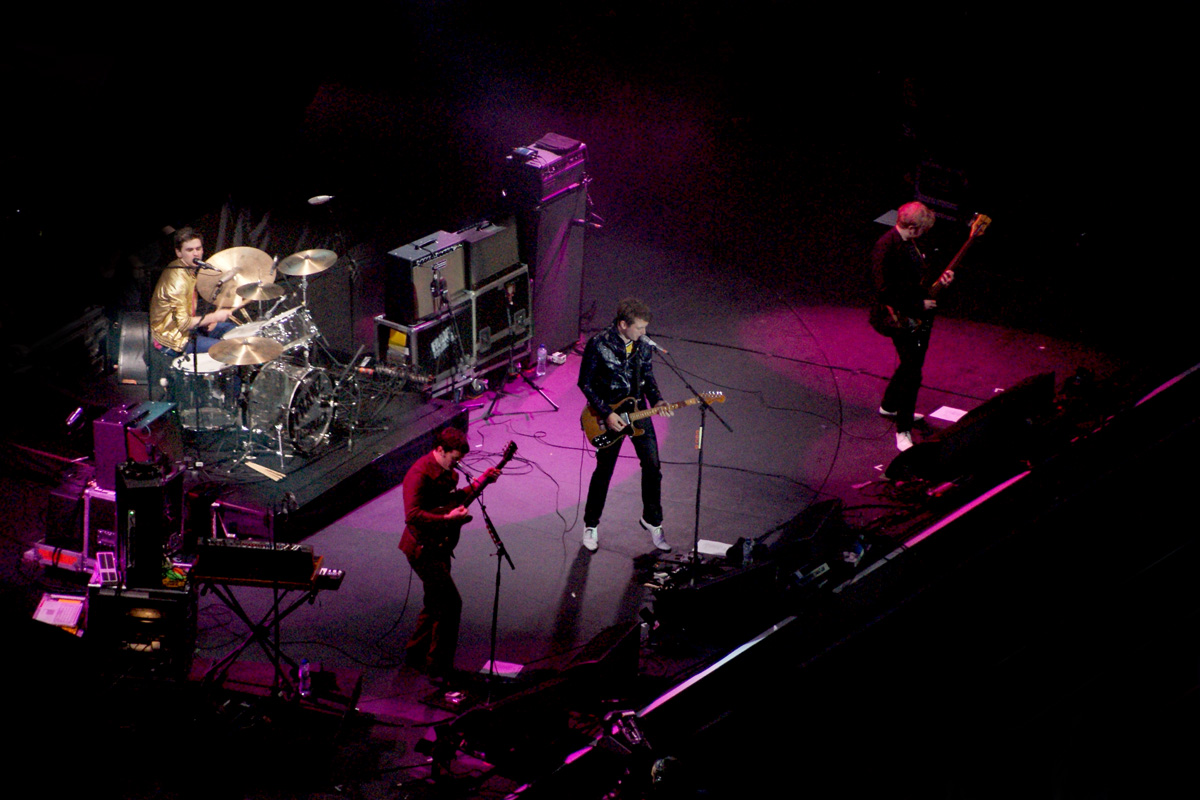
The band performing live in 2009, following the release of Tonight.

On 19 August 2008, Franz Ferdinand released "Lucid Dreams" through iTunes and made it available for streaming on their official website. It is also featured on the Madden NFL 09 soundtrack. The track on the album differs from this version and is four minutes longer. The song peaked at number 35 on the Billboard Canadian Hot 100. "Ulysses" was released on 19 January 2009. The song received its first airplay during Zane Lowe's radio show on BBC Radio 1 on 17 November 2008 and was made available for streaming on the band's MySpace Music profile later that day. It peaked at number 20 on the UK Singles Chart and number 20 on the Billboard Alternative Songs chart. It also charted in several other countries, marking a significant chart performance. "No You Girls" was released as a single on 6 April. The song was used in a commercial for the iPod Touch. The song peaked at number 22 in the UK and number 106 on the Billboard Hot 100, making it their first single to chart in the Hot 100 since "Do You Want To". It peaked in several other countries, as well, also marking a significant chart performance.

On 22 January, Tonight: Franz Ferdinand was made available for streaming through the band's official MySpace Music profile. Its official physical release came a few days later on 26 January. "Can't Stop Feeling" was released as the next single from the album. The song didn't have a chart performance as positive as "Ulysses" and "No You Girls", but it did chart at number 19 on the Belgian Flanders Tip singles chart, number 47 on the Italian Singles Chart, and number 69 on the French Singles Chart. "What She Came For" was released as a single on 31 August 2009 and "Live Alone" was released as a single on 13 November 2009. "Live Alone" didn't chart in any country.

=== Blood bonus disc ===
For its release on 26 January, the album is available as a box set which includes the whole album on six 7-inch vinyl singles and as a 2 disc limited edition. These special editions are only available in Europe and include a bonus disc called Blood which contains dub versions of the tracks from the album.

== Reception ==
=== Critical ===
Professional ratings
Aggregate scores
Source	Rating
Metacritic	70/100
Review scores
Source	Rating
AllMusic	3.5/5 stars
The A.V. Club	B−
Drowned in Sound	6/10
Entertainment Weekly	B+
NME	8/10
The Observer	3/5 stars
Pitchfork	7.3/10
Rolling Stone	3.5/5 stars
Spin	7/10
Uncut	3/5

Tonight received generally positive reviews from music critics. The album has a total score of 70/100 on Metacritic, based on 32 reviews, indicating "generally favourable reviews". It did not receive the amount of critical acclaim their first two studio albums received. Critics often praised the album's sound and the instrumentation of the songs on the album. The album's sound was also subject to criticism by some critics, as well as the lyrics and album production. Clash magazine commented that it could be "the band's most complete work to date. Worth the wait, and in all honesty better than we could ever have hoped for." The Financial Post states that "Tonight is the band's best album: Paradoxically, they've allowed themselves a degree of release from their characteristic tension by creating structures within which they can cut loose." The Telegraph commented on how Tonight: Franz Ferdinand is a melody-packed re-affirmation of everything that has made the band so popular hitherto, but with a highly contemporary-sounding, keyboard-driven edge. The Trades stated that "this [album] is an evolutionary step for the band rather than a revolutionary one. Smart and danceable, Tonight: Franz Ferdinand proves that Franz Ferdinand are the masters of dance-rock." NBC commented on how 'Franz Ferdinand has once again managed to outdo themselves with their best album to date.'

Uncut's and The Guardian's reviews were less enthusiastic. Uncut commented that the album sounds dry and superficial, and the songs are too similar to each other and other Franz Ferdinand songs. The Guardian stated that "if Franz's songwriting is broader than it was, it is still no deeper" and that "they'll keep trying to move your hips because they know they'll never win your heart." Paste was similarly severe, stating that the vocals are "leering", the production "horrific", and that the lyrics "seem to lack both heart and brain" and conclude by writing that "the layoff suggests that Franz is either too confused or too lazy to move forward".

=== Commercial ===
The album had a significant chart performance. It debuted at number two on the UK Album Chart, as well as number nine on the Billboard 200 in the U.S., selling about 31,000 copies in its first week of release. The album, however, suffered a fifty-place decline on the Billboard 200 from #9 to #59 in its second week on the chart. The album also charted in the top ten in Australia, Austria, Belgium, Canada, Finland, France, Germany, Hungary, Ireland, Italy, Japan, the Netherlands, New Zealand, Spain, and Switzerland. The album had a chart performance similar to their second studio album, You Could Have It So Much Better, which also charted in the top ten in several countries. In 2009. It was awarded a gold certification from the Independent Music Companies Association which indicated sales of at least 100,000 copies throughout Europe.

== Track listing ==
All tracks are written by Franz Ferdinand (Bob Hardy, Alex Kapranos, Nick McCarthy, Paul Thomson).

Tonight: Franz Ferdinand track listing
No.	Title	Length
1.	"Ulysses"	3:11
2.	"Turn It On"	2:20
3.	"No You Girls"	3:41
4.	"Send Him Away"	2:59
5.	"Twilight Omens"	2:29
6.	"Bite Hard"	3:26
7.	"What She Came For"	3:33
8.	"Live Alone"	3:29
9.	"Can't Stop Feeling"	3:02
10.	"Lucid Dreams"	7:56
11.	"Dream Again"	3:18
12.	"Katherine Kiss Me"	2:55
Total length:		42:25

Japanese bonus tracks
No.	Title	Length
13.	"Lucid Dreams" (Original Version)	3:42
14.	"Ulysses" (Disco Bloodbath Effect)	8:03
15.	"Feeling Kind of Anxious" ("Ulysses" dub mix)	6:31
Total length:		60:43

Japanese Deluxe Edition bonus tracks
No.	Title	Length
13.	"New Kind of Thrill"	4:29
14.	"Anyone in Love"	2:45
15.	"You Never Go Out Anymore"	2:08

iTunes bonus tracks
No.	Title	Length
13.	"Lucid Dreams" (Original Version) (US and Canada editions)	3:42
14.	"Ulysses" (Disco Bloodbath Effect) (European editions, US and Canada pre-order editions)	8:03
15.	"Feeling Kind of Anxious" ("Ulysses" dub mix) (US and Canada pre-order editions)	6:31

== Personnel ==
Personnel adapted from the album's liner notes.

- Producer: Franz Ferdinand, Dan Carey
- Mastering: John Dent
- Engineer: Paul Savage, Alexis Smith, Dan Carey, Allen Johnston (technical assistance)
- Mixing: Dan Carey (tracks 4, 7, 8, 10 to 12), Mike Fraser (tracks 1 to 3, 5, 6, 9, 10), Eric Mosher (assistant to Fraser)
- Artwork: Matthew Cooper, Franz Ferdinand (booklet), Rachel Graham (booklet), Søren Solkær Starbird (front cover)
- Personal assistant: Jeremiah Olvera

== Charts ==
=== Weekly charts ===
Weekly chart performance for Tonight: Franz Ferdinand
Chart (2009)	Peak position
Australian Albums (ARIA)	6
Austrian Albums (Ö3 Austria)	5
Belgian Albums (Ultratop Flanders)	6
Belgian Albums (Ultratop Wallonia)	4
Canadian Albums (Billboard)	2
Czech Albums (ČNS IFPI)	43
Danish Albums (Hitlisten)	17
Dutch Albums (Album Top 100)	4
European Albums (Billboard)	2
Finnish Albums (Suomen virallinen lista)	10
French Albums (SNEP)	4
German Albums (Offizielle Top 100)	2
Greek Albums (IFPI)	15
Hungarian Albums (MAHASZ)	6
Irish Albums (IRMA)	10
Italian Albums (FIMI)	8
Japanese Albums (Oricon)	6
Mexican Albums (Top 100 Mexico)	32
New Zealand Albums (RMNZ)	10
Norwegian Albums (VG-lista)	17
Polish Albums (ZPAV)	24
Portuguese Albums (AFP)	12
Scottish Albums (Official Charts)	2
Spanish Albums (Promusicae)	3
Swedish Albums (Sverigetopplistan)	13
Swiss Albums (Schweizer Hitparade)	3
UK Albums (Official Charts)	2
UK Independent Albums (Official Charts)	1
US Billboard 200	9
US Indie Store Album Sales (Billboard)	2
US Top Alternative Albums (Billboard)	2
US Top Rock Albums (Billboard)	3

=== Year-end charts ===
Year-end chart performance for Tonight: Franz Ferdinand
Chart (2009)	Position
French Albums (SNEP)	70
German Albums (Offizielle Top 100)	93
Swiss Albums (Schweizer Hitparade)	82
UK Albums (OCC)	149

== Certifications ==
Certifications for Tonight: Franz Ferdinand
Region	Certification	Certified units/sales
Canada (Music Canada)	Gold	40,000^{‡}
United Kingdom (BPI)	Gold	100,000^{*}
^{*} Sales figures based on certification alone.^{‡} Sales+streaming figures based on certification alone.
