= Ulysses (song) =

Single by Franz Ferdinand

from the album Tonight: Franz Ferdinand
- B-side: "New Kind of Thrill"; "Anyone in Love"; "You Never Go Out Anymore"
- Released: 2 December 2008
- Recorded: 2008
- Genre: Indie rock; dance-punk; new wave; electropop
- Length: 3:13
- Label: Domino
- Songwriters: Bob Hardy; Alex Kapranos; Nick McCarthy; Paul Thomson
- Producers: Dan Carey; Franz Ferdinand

Franz Ferdinand singles chronology
"Lucid Dreams" (2008)	"Ulysses" (2008)	"No You Girls" (2009)

Music video
- Ulysses on YouTube

"Ulysses" is a song by Scottish indie rock band Franz Ferdinand. It was released as the lead single from their third studio album, Tonight: Franz Ferdinand (2009), on 2 December 2008 in the United States and 18 January 2009 in the United Kingdom. "Ulysses" peaked at number 20 on the UK Singles Chart.

== Release ==
The song "Ulysses" was chosen to be the first single and was in physical format on 19 January 2009. It was debuted live on 5 August 2007 at the "Hey You Get Off My Pavement" festival in Glasgow and has been played at every full set gig since. The song received first airplay at BBC Radio 1 on 17 November 2008, and subsequently became available to download from the Canadian and US iTunes music stores on 2 December 2008. In the United States, the song reached #20 on the Billboard Modern Rock Tracks chart, the band's fifth single to appear on that chart. The song also entered the UK Singles Chart at a peak position of #20 on 25 January 2009. The video, directed by Will Lovelace and Dylan Southern, was premiered on 9 January 2009 and was filmed in various locations across Los Angeles. In an interview with Promonews, Alex Kapranos, the lead singer and guitarist of Franz Ferdinand stated he and the other band members were all jet legged and out of it for one reason or another. He also revealed that the make-up he'd been given to wear had caused an allergic reaction to his eyes, forcing him to wear thick sunglasses which can be seen at various points during the video, Kapranos also remarking his eyes had swelled to "Merrick proportions".

The cover art for the single is part of a series of photographs the band are taking on their travels, recreating crime scenes; this one features Kapranos face-down in the street, presumably dead, while his bandmates look on. The Ulysses cover shot was taken in Brooklyn by Guy Eppel.

== Reception ==
"Ulysses" featured on Triple J's Hottest 100 Countdown in 2008, polling 82nd. The track was also featured on the second season of Skins's promo advert.

Ulysses is the Roman name for the Greek mythological hero Odysseus, as well as the title for the novel of the same name by James Joyce.

The song has been used for the television commercial of Toyota Mark X ZiO in Japan since February 2009., as well as the video game Colin McRae: Dirt 2.

== Track listing ==
- CD RUG314CD
1. "Ulysses" – 3:13
2. "New Kind of Thrill" – 4:28
3. "Ulysses" (Beyond the Wizard's Sleeve Re-Animation) – 6:13
- 7" RUG314
1. "Ulysses" – 3:13
2. "Anyone in Love" – 2:44
- 7" RUG314X
1. "Ulysses" – 3:13
2. "You Never Go Out Anymore" – 2:05
- AUS / German CD 88697459512
1. "Ulysses" – 3:14
2. "New Kind of Thrill" – 4:29
3. "Anyone in Love" – 2:45
4. "You Never Go Out Anymore" – 2:06
5. "Ulysses" (Beyond the Wizard's Sleeve Re-Animation) – 6:13
- 12" RUG314T
1. "Ulysses" (Beyond the Wizard's Sleeve Re-Animation) – 6:13
2. "Feeling Kind of Anxious" – 6:33
3. "Ulysses" (Disco Bloodbath Effect) – 8:06
4. "Ulysses" (Mickey Moonlight Remix) – 3:49
- Download RUG314D11
1. "Ulysses" (Zomby 92 Remix) – 2:21
2. "Ulysses" (Zomby 8 Bit Rremix) – 3:00

== Personnel ==
- Artwork – Franz Ferdinand & Matthew Cooper
- Engineer – Alexis Smith, Paul Savage
- Mastering – Jason Mitchell, John Dent
- Photography – Guy Eppel
- Recording, producer – Dan Carey, Franz Ferdinand
- Songwriter – Franz Ferdinand
- Mastered at Loud Mastering.

== Charts ==
Weekly chart performance for "Ulysses"
Chart (2009)	Peak position
Australia (ARIA)	62
Austria (Ö3 Austria Top 40)	45
Belgium (Ultratip Bubbling Under Flanders)	9
Belgium (Ultratip Bubbling Under Wallonia)	8
Canada Hot 100 (Billboard)	73
European Hot 100 Singles (Billboard)	32
France (SNEP)	31
Germany (GfK)	41
Japan (Japan Hot 100)	3
Switzerland (Schweizer Hitparade)	44
UK Singles (OCC)	20
US Alternative Airplay (Billboard)	20

Annual chart rankings for "Ulysses"
Chart (2009)	Rank
Japan Adult Contemporary (Billboard)	34
