= Karan Kandhari =

Indian filmwriter and director

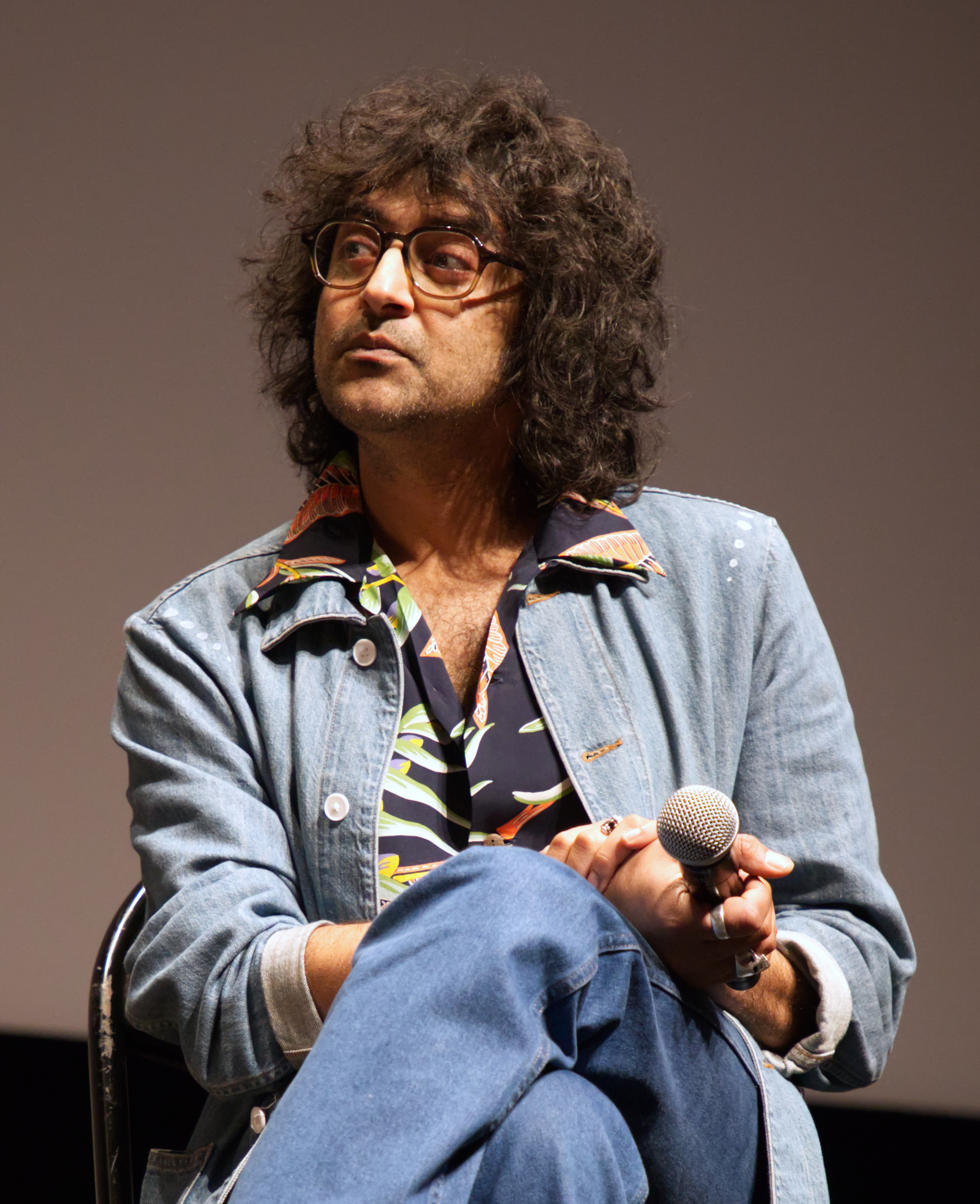
- Kandhari at the 2024 Cannes Film Festival for the premiere of Sister Midnight
- Born: India
- Occupations: Film director; screenwriter; cinematographer
- Years active: 2000s–present
- Notable work: Hard Hat (2009); Bye Bye Miss Goodnight; Sister Midnight (2024)

Karan Kandhari is a British–Indian film director, screenwriter, and cinematographer. He is best known for his award-winning short film Hard Hat (2009) and for his feature-length directorial debut Sister Midnight (2024), which premiered in the Directors' Fortnight section of the 2024 Cannes Film Festival.

== Filmography ==
Karan Kandhari's Filmography
Year	Title	Role	Notes
2005	Bye Bye Miss Goodnight	Director, Writer	Avant-garde road movie set in Mumbai
2009	Hard Hat	Director, Writer	Short film about immigrants in London; won Audience Award at Rushes Soho Short Film Festival (2010)
2012	Flight of the Pompadour	Director	Short film
2013	Sidney	Director	Short film
2013	Out of Tune	Director	Short film
2024	Sister Midnight	Director	Feature film; premiered at the 2024 Cannes Film Festival

== Critical response ==
"There is evidence of better things to come from British Asian directors, as Karan Kandhari demonstrates with Bye Bye Miss Goodnight. Offering a uniquely avant-garde snapshot of modern urban India, this visually ambitious road movie belies its modest budget to chronicle the unlikely encounter between a daydreaming Mumbai cabby and a pregnant, hitchhiking free spirit." - David Parkinson, BBC Film
