= You Could Have It So Much Better =

2005 album by Franz Ferdinand

Studio album by Franz Ferdinand
- Released: 28 September 2005
- Recorded: Spring 2005 in Scotland and New York City
- Genres: Indie rock; post-punk revival; dance-punk
- Length: 41:16
- Label: Domino
- Producers: Rich Costey; Franz Ferdinand

Franz Ferdinand chronology
Franz Ferdinand (2004)	You Could Have It So Much Better (2005)	Tonight: Franz Ferdinand (2009)

Singles from You Could Have It So Much Better
- 1. "Do You Want To" Released: 19 September 2005; 2. "Walk Away" Released: 5 December 2005; 3. "The Fallen" / "L. Wells" Released: 3 April 2006 (Note: "The Fallen" by itself was first released in Australia on 20 February 2006.); 4. "Eleanor Put Your Boots On" Released: 17 July 2006

You Could Have It So Much Better is the second studio album by Scottish indie rock band Franz Ferdinand. It was first released on 28 September 2005 in Japan, and later on 3 October in the UK, through the Domino Recording Company. Recorded in both New York City and their own studio in Glasgow with producer Rich Costey, the album spawned four UK top 30 singles: "Do You Want To", "The Fallen", "Walk Away" and "Eleanor Put Your Boots On."

The album became the band's first UK number-one album, and although their debut album was relatively successful in the United States, going platinum and reaching number 32, You Could Have It So Much Better managed to reach number 8 and earn gold status in the United States. The cover design is modeled on Alexander Rodchenko's 1924 portrait of Lilya Brik. It was produced by Rich Costey and Franz Ferdinand.

== History ==
Initially it was reported that the album would simply be eponymous like the debut album, 2004's Franz Ferdinand. Singer Alex Kapranos explained, "The whole point is that the album doesn't have a title. We decided quite a while ago that we didn't want to give any of the albums titles, they were just going to be called 'Franz Ferdinand'."

He added, "The albums are going to be identified by their colour schemes rather than a title. The contrast of different colours creates a different mood. We experimented with different combinations of colours and this one stuck. At one level they looked good together, and they capture the mood of this record quite well."

However, on 1 August it was revealed that the band had changed their minds and decided to give the album a name. First, they revealed that the title Outsiders was considered before the current title was decided upon.

As drummer Paul Thomson explained, "I was thinking something similar, but that 'You Could Have It So Much Better' would have been even greater. We talked about how we liked that idea a lot and that it was a real shame that the album wasn't going to have a title. Then we started laughing when we realized that the album hadn't been manufactured yet and we could change it after all." The title was also initially reported as the lengthy You Could Have It So Much Better... With Franz Ferdinand. The album's cover art is inspired by the works of Alexander Rodchenko, the Russian avant-garde photographer and collage pioneer. In particular, the cover image is a direct copy of Rodchenko's of Lilya Brik.

The song "You're the Reason I'm Leaving" is believed to be a dual-meaning track; it can be read as a typical relationship-centered song, but also as being a lighthearted political commentary on the rivalry between the UK Prime Minister Tony Blair and the Chancellor of the Exchequer) Gordon Brown (who would later succeed Blair as prime minister). The song contains the lyric: I'd no idea that in four years I'd be hanging from a beam behind the door of number ten, singing "fare thee well, I am leaving, yes I leave it all to you". "Number ten" here refers to 10 Downing Street, the address of the UK Prime Minister. Four years was the typical length of a parliament before five-year fixed term legislation was passed in 2011.

"The Fallen" was used by the NFL on Fox for promos during the 2011 NFL season.

== Chart performance ==
The album was the first chart topping album for both the band and their label, Domino Recording Company, in the UK. In the weeks after being released, the album fell first to number 5, then number 9, number 15, and number 24, before resting at number 40 in the charts. On 25 December 2005, the album had risen to number 37 in the charts. A week later, on 1 January 2006, the album had risen again to number 24 in the UK Albums Chart, but fell two spots to number 26 the following week before rising again to number 23 on 15 January. A week later, the album had fallen again to number 26. On 29 January, the album had fallen a further six spots to number 32. The album fell out of the top 40 altogether the week of 5 February.

Entering and peaking at number 8, the album has sold 378,000 units in the United States as of October 2008, somewhat below the sales success of the band's 2004 debut, although it was certified gold.

== Critical reception ==
Professional ratings
Aggregate scores
Source	Rating
Metacritic	83/100
Review scores
Source	Rating
AllMusic	3.5/5 stars
Entertainment Weekly	B+
The Guardian	4/5 stars
Los Angeles Times	4/4 stars
NME	9/10
Pitchfork	8.3/10
Q	4/5 stars
Rolling Stone	3.5/5 stars
Spin	B+
The Village Voice	A−

You Could Have It So Much Better received universal acclaim from music critics, with a score of 83 out of 100 on Metacritic. Nitsuh Abebe of Pitchfork complimented the band on returning with a "big ridiculous stomper, a song whose hooks get so happily ballroom-glam you'd almost think they stole them from the Sweet or the Bay City Rollers–the kind of song most bands wouldn't be able to pull off without telegraphing a whole lot of irony and embarrassment". Will Hermes of Entertainment Weekly wrote that the album "shows Franz Ferdinand working harder and sounding bigger, befitting their stature as rock's saviors of the moment", while David Fricke of Rolling Stone noted that the album "shows deeper roots in the first wave of white electric dance music: specifically the crunchy-guitar R&B and arch-garage songwriting of 1965–1967 Kinks". Spin's Andrew Beaujon stated that it "sounds exactly like what you'd expect, with pumping disco beats and lookin'-sharp guitars on track after propulsive track", and the magazine later ranked it the third best album of 2005 and called it "so much better than its predecessor" thanks to Kapranos' "dubious sensitivity".

== Track listing ==
All tracks are written by Alex Kapranos, Nick McCarthy, Bob Hardy and Paul Thomson, with lead vocals provided by Alex Kapranos except where noted.

No.	Title	Length
1.	"The Fallen"	3:42
2.	"Do You Want To"	3:35
3.	"This Boy"	2:21
4.	"Walk Away"	3:36
5.	"Evil and a Heathen"	2:05
6.	"You're the Reason I'm Leaving"	2:47
7.	"Eleanor Put Your Boots On"	2:49
8.	"Well That Was Easy"	3:02
9.	"What You Meant"	3:24
10.	"I'm Your Villain"	4:03
11.	"You Could Have It So Much Better"	2:41
12.	"Fade Together"	3:03
13.	"Outsiders"	4:02
Total length:		41:16

Japan release
No.	Title	Length
14.	"Your Diary" (also a B-side on the British CD single for "Do You Want To")	3:08
15.	"Fabulously Lazy" (also a B-side on the British Maxi-CD single for "Do You Want To"; lead vocals performed by Nick McCarthy (verses, bridge) and Alex Kapranos (chorus))	2:55

iTunes only exclusive
No.	Title	Length
14.	"Do You Want To" (live at Princes Street Gardens Edinburgh)	3:42

== Personnel ==
Franz Ferdinand

- Alex Kapranos
- Nick McCarthy
- Bob Hardy
- Paul Thomson

Additional personnel

- Rich Costey – production, mixing
- Franz Ferdinand – production
- Claudius Mittendorfer – engineering
- Jim Keller – engineering assistance
- Michael Parker – engineering assistance
- Howie Weinberg – mastering
- Shana Moulton – cover photo
- Perou – band photos

== Charts ==
=== Weekly charts ===
Weekly chart performance for You Could Have It So Much Better
Chart (2005–2006)	Peak position
Australian Albums (ARIA)	5
Austrian Albums (Ö3 Austria)	5
Belgian Albums (Ultratop Flanders)	4
Belgian Albums (Ultratop Wallonia)	8
Canadian Albums (Billboard)	3
Danish Albums (Hitlisten)	8
Dutch Albums (Album Top 100)	9
European Albums (Billboard)	1
Finnish Albums (Suomen virallinen lista)	6
French Albums (SNEP)	5
German Albums (Offizielle Top 100)	2
Greek Albums (IFPI)	10
Hungarian Albums (MAHASZ)	11
Irish Albums (IRMA)	2
Italian Albums (FIMI)	8
Japanese Albums (Oricon)	7
New Zealand Albums (RMNZ)	7
Norwegian Albums (VG-lista)	4
Polish Albums (ZPAV)	35
Portuguese Albums (AFP)	8
Scottish Albums (Official Charts)	1
Spanish Albums (Promusicae)	13
Swedish Albums (Sverigetopplistan)	6
Swiss Albums (Schweizer Hitparade)	4
UK Albums (Official Charts)	1
UK Independent Albums (Official Charts)	1
US Billboard 200	8

=== Year-end charts ===
2005 year-end chart performance for You Could Have It So Much Better
Chart (2005)	Position
Belgian Albums (Ultratop Flanders)	55
Belgian Albums (Ultratop Wallonia)	92
Dutch Albums (Album Top 100)	87
French Albums (SNEP)	122
German Albums (Offizielle Top 100)	94
Swiss Albums (Schweizer Hitparade)	79
UK Albums (OCC)	50

2006 year-end chart performance for You Could Have It So Much Better
Chart (2006)	Position
French Albums (SNEP)	194
UK Albums (OCC)	173

== Certifications ==
Certifications for You Could Have It So Much Better
Region	Certification	Certified units/sales
Australia (ARIA)	Gold	35,000^{^}
Belgium (BRMA)	Gold	25,000^{*}
Canada (Music Canada)	Gold	50,000^{‡}
Germany (BVMI)	Gold	100,000^{^}
Japan (RIAJ)	Gold	100,000^{^}
New Zealand (RMNZ)	Gold	7,500^{^}
Switzerland (IFPI Switzerland)	Gold	20,000^{^}
United Kingdom (BPI)	Platinum	300,000^{^}
United States (RIAA)	Gold	500,000^{^}
Summaries
Europe (IFPI)	Platinum	1,000,000^{*}
^{*} Sales figures based on certification alone.^{^} Shipments figures based on certification alone.^{‡} Sales+streaming figures based on certification alone.

== Release history ==
Release history and formats for You Could Have It So Much Better
Country	Date	Label	Format	Catalog	Notes
Japan	28 September 2005	Sony Japan	CD	EICP-555	
Japan	7 December 2005	Sony Japan	CD	EICP-575	Japanese reissue
Japan	1 February 2006	Sony Japan	2CD	EICP-595/596	Japanese edition with bonus disc You Could Have It So Much Better & Better
United Kingdom	3 October 2005	Domino	LP	WIGLP161	
United Kingdom	3 October 2005	Domino	CD	WIGCD161	
United Kingdom	3 October 2005	Domino	CD; DVD	WIGCD161X	
United States	4 October 2005	Domino; Epic	LP	E94800	
United States	4 October 2005	Domino; Epic	CD	EK94800	
United States	4 October 2005	Domino; Epic	DualDisc	EN97725	Contains the material featured on the UK CD and DVD edition
