= Do You Want To =

2005 single by Franz Ferdinand

Single by Franz Ferdinand

from the album You Could Have It So Much Better
- B-side: "Fabulously Lazy"; "What You Meant" (acoustic); "Get Away"; "Your Diary"
- Released: 19 September 2005
- Genre: Indie rock; dance-rock
- Length: 3:35
- Label: Domino
- Songwriters: Alex Kapranos; Nick McCarthy; Robert Hardy; Paul Thomson
- Producers: Franz Ferdinand; Rich Costey

Franz Ferdinand singles chronology
| "This Fffire" (2004) | "Do You Want To" (2005) | "Walk Away" (2005) |

"Do You Want To" is the lead single from Scottish rock band Franz Ferdinand's second studio album, You Could Have It So Much Better (2005). It was released 19 September 2005 and charted at number four on the UK Singles Chart. In the United States, the song peaked at number nine on the Billboard Modern Rock Tracks chart and number 76 on the Billboard Hot 100. In February 2006, the single was certified gold by the Recording Industry Association of America (RIAA). The song's music video, directed by Diane Martel, was released on 23 August and was played every hour on MTV2 on the day it debuted.

== Reception ==
"Do You Want To" was named the Sound Opinions single of 2005. The song was also ranked 10th on Triple J's Hottest 100 for 2005. On Q's "Top 100 Indie Anthems Ever", it was placed on number 43; Q also named it the greatest single of 2005. Pitchfork Media ranked the song at number 342 on their list of the "Top 500 Tracks of the 2000s".

== Track listings ==
UK CD single

1. "Do You Want To"
2. "Fabulously Lazy"
3. "What You Meant" (acoustic)

UK 7-inch single

A. "Do You Want To"
B. "Get Away"

UK 12-inch single

A. "Do You Want To" (Erol Alkan's Glam Racket)
AA. "Do You Want To" (original version)

European CD single

1. "Do You Want To"
2. "Your Diary"

== Charts ==
=== Weekly charts ===
Weekly chart performance for "Do You Want To"
| Chart (2005–2006) | Peak position |
|---|---|
| Belgium (Ultratip Bubbling Under Flanders) | 8 |
| Canada (Nielsen BDS) | 39 |
| Canada Rock Top 30 (Radio & Records) | 4 |
| Europe (Eurochart Hot 100) | 13 |
| France (SNEP) | 68 |
| Germany (GfK) | 70 |
| Ireland (IRMA) | 26 |
| Italy (FIMI) | 35 |
| Japan (Oricon) | 169 |
| Netherlands (Dutch Top 40 Tipparade) | 11 |
| Netherlands (Single Top 100) | 13 |
| Russia Airplay (TopHit) | 195 |
| Scotland Singles (Official Charts) | 2 |
| Spain (Promusicae) | 5 |
| Sweden (Sverigetopplistan) | 45 |
| Switzerland (Schweizer Hitparade) | 75 |
| Ukraine Airplay (TopHit) | 137 |
| UK Singles (Official Charts) | 4 |
| UK Indie (Official Charts) | 1 |
| US Billboard Hot 100 | 76 |
| US Alternative Airplay (Billboard) | 9 |

=== Year-end charts ===
Year-end chart performance for "Do You Want To"
| Chart (2005) | Position |
|---|---|
| UK Singles (OCC) | 92 |
| US Modern Rock Tracks (Billboard) | 59 |

== Certifications ==
Certifications and sales for "Do You Want To"
| Region | Certification | Certified units/sales |
|---|---|---|
| United Kingdom (BPI) | Silver | 200,000^{‡} |
| United States (RIAA) | Gold | 500,000^{*} |
^{*} Sales figures based on certification alone.^{‡} Sales+streaming figures based on certification alone.

== Release history ==
Release dates and formats for "Do You Want To"
| Region | Date | Format(s) | Label | Ref(s). |
|---|---|---|---|---|
| United States | 22 August 2005 | Triple A; alternative radio | Domino | |
| Australia | 18 September 2005 | Digital download | Sony Music Australia | |
| United Kingdom | 19 September 2005 | 7-inch vinyl; CD; digital download | Domino | |
| United States | 7 November 2005 | Contemporary hit radio | Domino | |
| Japan | 16 November 2005 | CD | Domino | |
