= FFS (album) =

Studio album by FFS
- Released: 8 June 2015
- Recorded: Late 2014
- Studio: RAK (London)
- Genre: Indie rock; electropop; art rock; dance-rock
- Length: 47:04
- Label: Domino
- Producer: John Congleton

Franz Ferdinand chronology
Late Night Tales: Franz Ferdinand (2014)	FFS (2015)	Always Ascending (2018)

Sparks chronology
Two Hands, One Mouth: Live in Europe (2013)	FFS (2015)	Hippopotamus (2017)

Singles from FFS
- 1. "Piss Off" Released: 1 April 2015; 2. "Johnny Delusional" Released: 14 April 2015; 3. "Collaborations Don't Work" Released: 27 April 2015; 4. "Call Girl" Released: 28 May 2015; 5. "Police Encounters" Released: 23 October 2015

FFS is the only studio album by Scottish-American supergroup FFS, consisting of members from the Scottish band Franz Ferdinand and the American band Sparks. It was released on 8 June 2015 through Domino. The album was recorded during a 15-day period in late 2014 at RAK Studios in London and was produced by Grammy Award-winning record producer John Congleton. Although the album itself was recorded in 2014, the two bands first met each other in mid-2000s. Upon release, the album received positive reviews from music critics.

Five singles were released from the album: "Piss Off", "Johnny Delusional", "Collaborations Don't Work", "Call Girl", and "Police Encounters".

== Background and recording ==
Franz Ferdinand and Sparks originally began working on music together in 2004, shortly after the release of Franz Ferdinand's debut studio album, when it was discovered that the two bands were fans of each other. They had sent each other a few demos, one of which was "Piss Off", the twelfth track on FFS, but the two bands were busy with other activities and they were not able to fully record an album together. Nine years later, it was announced that the two bands were both performing at the 2013 Coachella Valley Music and Arts Festival. While searching for a dentist in San Francisco, Alex Kapranos, a member of Franz Ferdinand, was found by Ron and Russell Mael of Sparks. The Mael brothers invited the band to watch their set at the festival, and later, the two bands agreed that it was time to record an album together. FFS was recorded at RAK Studios in London during a 15-day period in late 2014. It was produced by Grammy Award-winning music producer John Congleton. The album has been described as art rock, electropop, indie pop, and dance-rock.

== Promotion and release ==
On the same day the group's formation was announced, they released a 30-second teaser video on their official YouTube channel titled "The Domino Effect", featuring the song "The Power Couple", the tenth song from the album, playing in the background of the video. "Piss Off" was released as the first single on 1 April 2015. The music video for "Piss Off" was released later on 7 June. They also announced that they would be setting out on a three-month tour across Europe on the same day. "Johnny Delusional" was released as a single on 13 April and received a music video on 19 May. "Collaborations Don't Work" was as the third single on 27 April and was first played during the Radcliffe & Maconie programme on BBC Radio 6 Music. "Call Girl" was released as the fourth single on 28 May and received a music video on 14 October. Shortly after, "Police Encounters" was released on 23 October as the album's final single, backed with "Antarctica", a song that was left off of the album.

FFS was released on 8 June 2015 through Domino. Listings for the album were eventually available for pre-order on the Domino website. Both standard and deluxe versions were listed, with the deluxe edition featuring four bonus tracks, "So Many Bridges", "King of the Song", "Look At Me", and "A Violent Death". A limited edition red-coloured vinyl release was also listed, with ten copies being signed by the group members themselves. On 31 May, the album became available for streaming via the NPR Music website, similar to Franz Ferdinand's previous studio album Right Thoughts, Right Words, Right Action which was also available for streaming on the site.

== Critical reception ==
Professional ratings
Aggregate scores
Source	Rating
Metacritic	78/100
Review scores
Source	Rating
AllMusic	4/5 stars
The A.V. Club	B+
Classic Rock	8/10
Consequence of Sound	B
The Guardian	4/5 stars
The Independent	4/5 stars
NME	7/10
Now	4/5 stars
Pitchfork	7.1/10
Rolling Stone	3.5/5 stars

FFS received positive reviews from music critics. On review aggregator site Metacritic, the album has a score of 78/100 based on 24 critics, indicating "generally favourable reviews". At Consequence of Sound, Ryan Bray writes:

It's evident from the outset that things on FFS are going to work out just fine, and the record keeps that momentum flowing largely through to the end. Franz Ferdinand's panicked dance rock gets a new lease, even if it's a mild reinvention. Meanwhile, Sparks are at their quirky best thanks to their newfound collaboration. Both acts insist that FFS isn't a one-off musical play date, that they're invested in the project as a full-time thing. This debut is enough to make you hope both sides make good on that promise.

Writing for NOW, Carla Gillis writes that:

It might be too weird for the average FF fan – "Dictator's Son" is total nerd prog, for example, and most of the songs take sharp turns – but others will find that the pair-up has revitalised FF's sound and taken it in a far more interesting direction while also giving an overdue spotlight to Sparks. Vocal duties are seamlessly shared between FF's Alex Kapranos and Sparks' Russell Mael, a shockingly smooth passing of the baton in every song.

At The A.V. Club, Annie Zaleski wrote that the album "seamlessly meshes the sonic styles of the two bands. Jaunty piano, cheeky keyboards, glammy guitars, rhythmic digital jolts and theatrical arrangements lead to music that's akin to a mashup of Broadway musicals, '70s classic rock, and perforated electropop." Writing for The Independent, Andy Gill wrote that, musically, the album is:

an almost seamless blend of the two groups' styles, variations on a sort of operatic indie-electropop, which recalls variously Freedom of Choice-era Devo, chattering Kraftwerk techno and, in the more melancholy environs inhabited by "Little Guy from the Suburbs", a whiff of Leonard Cohen. Russell Mael's and Alex Kapranos's voices likewise braid pleasingly on their shared songs, while both parties seem to have egged each other on lyrically, with songs about a dictator's son living large, a Japanese girl toting a "Hello Kitty Uzi", and a litany of "Things I Won't Get" that includes both luxuries (a Bentley Arnage), qualities (celebrity) and theories ("Schoenberg and twelve-tone and such"), all supposedly outweighed by the solace of a partner's love.

=== Accolades ===
FFS appeared on three critics' year-end lists. In January 2016, the album was recognized by NME as one of the 16 most "electrifying collaboration LPs". In June 2016, it was shortlisted for the Scottish Album of the Year Award.

Accolades for FFS
Country	Publication	List	Rank	Ref.
UK	Daily Record	20 Best Albums of 2015	10	
UK	The Guardian	The Best Albums of 2015	34	
UK	Rough Trade	Albums of the Year 2015	23	

== Track listing ==
All tracks are written by FFS.

FFS track listing
No.	Title	Length
1.	"Johnny Delusional"	3:11
2.	"Call Girl"	3:21
3.	"Dictator's Son"	4:15
4.	"Little Guy from the Suburbs"	5:09
5.	"Police Encounters"	3:10
6.	"Save Me from Myself"	3:57
7.	"Sō Desu Ne"	3:52
8.	"The Man Without a Tan"	3:28
9.	"Things I Won't Get"	3:03
10.	"The Power Couple"	3:01
11.	"Collaborations Don't Work"	6:42
12.	"Piss Off"	3:55
Total length:		47:04

Deluxe edition tracks
No.	Title	Length
13.	"So Many Bridges"	3:16
14.	"King of the Song"	3:06
15.	"Look at Me"	5:43
16.	"A Violent Death"	3:51
Total length:		63:00

== Personnel ==
FFS

- Alex Kapranos – lead and backing vocals, guitars, keyboards (track 1)
- Nick McCarthy – guitars, keyboards, lead vocals (track 9), backing vocals
- Bob Hardy – bass guitar, backing vocals
- Paul Thomson – drums, backing vocals
- Russell Mael – lead and backing vocals
- Ron Mael – keyboards, backing vocals

Production

- John Congleton – production, engineering; mixing (tracks 3–6, 8–16)
- Cenzo Townshend – mixing (tracks 1, 2, & 7)
- Mike Horner – assistant engineer
- Greg Calbi – mastering

Additional personnel

- Matthew Cooper – layout design
- David Edwards – photography
- Galen Johnson – front cover design

== Charts ==
Chart performance for FFS
Chart (2015)	Peak position
Australian Albums (ARIA)	85
Austrian Albums (Ö3 Austria)	36
Belgian Albums (Ultratop Flanders)	47
Belgian Albums (Ultratop Wallonia)	45
Dutch Albums (Album Top 100)	13
French Albums (SNEP)	27
German Albums (Offizielle Top 100)	22
Italian Albums (FIMI)	60
Scottish Albums (OCC)	8
Spanish Albums (Promusicae)	53
Swiss Albums (Schweizer Hitparade)	19
UK Albums (OCC)	17
UK Album Downloads (OCC)	36
UK Independent Albums (OCC)	2
US Heatseekers Albums (Billboard)	4
US Top Alternative Albums (Billboard)	15
US Top Rock Albums (Billboard)	22
