= Take Me Out (song) =

2004 single by Franz Ferdinand

Single by Franz Ferdinand

from the album Franz Ferdinand
- B-side: "Truck Stop"; "All for You, Sophia"; "Words So Leisured"
- Released: 12 January 2004
- Studio: Gula (Malmö, Sweden)
- Genre: Post-punk revival; indie rock; dance-rock; garage rock; art rock
- Length: 3:57
- Label: Domino
- Songwriters: Alex Kapranos; Nick McCarthy
- Producer: Tore Johansson

Franz Ferdinand singles chronology
"Darts of Pleasure" (2003)	"Take Me Out" (2004)	"The Dark of the Matinée" (2004)

Music video
- "Take Me Out" on YouTube

"Take Me Out" is a song by Scottish indie rock band Franz Ferdinand. It was released as the second single from their eponymous debut studio album in the United Kingdom on 12 January 2004 and in the United States on 12 April 2004, both through Domino Records. It was released as 7-inch vinyl, a CD single, and a DVD single with the music video and a short interview with the band.

The single reached number three in the UK Singles Chart. In the United States, it reached number three on the Billboard Modern Rock Tracks chart and number 66 on the Billboard Hot 100. The single was certified multi-platinum in Canada, New Zealand, Spain, the United Kingdom, and the US. The song was voted the best single of 2004 by The Village Voice Pazz & Jop poll, and number one on Australian youth radio network Triple J's Hottest 100 of the same year. In July 2009, it was voted number 100 on Triple J's Hottest 100 of All Time.

== Background ==
Franz Ferdinand formed in Glasgow in 2002 and wrote "Take Me Out" the following year. Songwriter Alex Kapranos said the idea for the song's theme came from watching a snipers' duel in the film Enemy at the Gates and that "it felt like a very good metaphor for the kind of romantic situations that we sometimes find ourselves in".

== Composition ==
"Take Me Out" has been described musically as post-punk revival, indie rock, dance-rock, garage rock, and art rock. Its first section is fast tempo guitar driven, with notes of a chord separated into individual notes, which was influenced by Giorgio Moroder, followed by a slower second section with disco hi-hat patterns and snare drums.

The call and answer guitar riff and vocal melody were inspired by blues musician Howlin' Wolf. The band attempted different arrangements before settling on a mid-song tempo change. Alex Kapranos said: "The verses sounded better played a little bit faster and the chorus sounded better played a little slower and we could never quite work it out... I had this idea that we’re going to take all of the verses, put them at the beginning of the song, and then we’re going to slow it down and play all the choruses, which is kind of the wrong way to do it."

== Recording ==
The song was recorded at Gula Studion in Malmö, Sweden with producer Tore Johansson. The tempo changes were recorded live in the studio. The sound of the cymbal being caught as soon as it was hit was influenced by rock music such as Queen. Producer Johansson said: "there was no editing other than that we compiled the best take. We didn't do any tricks of doing that on a different take and then doing the rest of the track." Johansson used multiple echo effects to achieve a "marching, machinery, industrial feel... It's very organic, but we wanted it to sound like you're in a big workshop or something."

== Music video ==
The music video for the song was directed by Jonas Odell. It includes the band amid a Dadaist animation involving quirky vintage figures and machinery reminiscent of Terry Gilliam's cartoon segments for Monty Python. The video is a blend of the live-action band superimposed into a 3D environment with animated 2D elements. Frontman Alex Kapranos described the video's influences as Dada, the films of Busby Berkeley, and Soviet propaganda, and praised Odell's direction. Kapranos commented:

Basically it's a pop video and it should entertain you, but not just once – there're certain things you stare at in life that are just fascinating to look at like a fish tank or an open fire, they're actually quite simple things but there's something fascinating about them. And I think pop videos should be like that too. There should be something there that just makes you want to come back and look at it.

== Accolades ==
The song received high critical acclaim upon its release in January 2004. Drowned in Sound called it "a work of sheer clanging wonder". In March 2005, Q magazine placed "Take Me Out" at number 41 on its list of the 100 Greatest Guitar Tracks. In September 2005, the same magazine named it the 34th greatest track ever performed by a British band. Q made another list for its television channel, also named Q, of 100 greatest Indie Anthems, where "Take Me Out" appeared at number six. In May 2007, NME magazine placed "Take Me Out" at number 16 on its list of the 50 Greatest Indie Anthems Ever, whereas MTV2 placed it at number seven on its version of the 50 Greatest Indie Anthems Ever, which was loosely based on NME's list. In October 2011, NME placed it at number 27 on its list of 150 Best Tracks of the Past 15 Years. Pitchfork ranked the song number 44 on its top 500 tracks of the 2000s. Rolling Stone magazine ranked "Take Me Out" number 327 on the 2010 version of its list of "The 500 Greatest Songs of All Time".

== Formats and track listings ==
UK 7-inch single

A. "Take Me Out"
B. "Truck Stop" (BBC Radio 1 Session)

UK limited-edition 12-inch single

A. "Take Me Out"
B. "Take Me Out" (Morgan Geist Re-Version)

UK CD single

1. "Take Me Out"
2. "All for You, Sophia"
3. "Words So Leisured"

UK DVD single

1. "Take Me Out" (video)
2. "Take Me Out" (live at Electrowerkz)
3. Interview
4. Photo gallery with "Shopping for Blood" live at Paradiso

US 12-inch single

A1. "Take Me Out" (album version)
A2. "Take Me Out" (Morgan Geist remix)
B1. "Take Me Out" (Naoum Gabo remix)
B2. "Take Me Out" (instrumental version)

Australian CD single

1. "Take Me Out"
2. "Shopping for Blood"
3. "Truck Stop (Auf Achse)"
4. "Take Me Out" (Naoum Gabo re-version)

French 12-inch and CD single

1. "Take Me Out" (Daft Punk remix)
2. "Take Me Out" (album version)
3. "Take Me Out" (Naoum Gabo remix)

2013 remixes digital download

1. "Take Me Out" (Daft Punk remix) – 4:33
2. "Take Me Out" (Naoum Gabo remix) – 5:04

== Personnel ==
Personnel are taken from the Song Exploder podcast.

- Alex Kapranos – lead vocals, guitar
- Nick McCarthy – guitar, backing vocals
- Bob Hardy – bass guitar
- Paul Thomson – drums

== Charts ==
=== Weekly charts ===
Chart (2004)	Peak position
Australia (ARIA)	25
Canada (Nielsen SoundScan)	7
Canada Rock Top 30 (Radio & Records)	9
Denmark (Tracklisten)	16
Europe (Eurochart Hot 100)	10
France (SNEP)	92
Ireland (IRMA)	8
Netherlands (Dutch Top 40 Tipparade)	14
Netherlands (Single Top 100)	72
New Zealand (Recorded Music NZ)	16
Scottish Singles Sales (Official Charts)	2
Sweden (Sverigetopplistan)	43
UK Singles (Official Charts)	3
UK Indie (Official Charts)	1
UK Rock & Metal (Official Charts)	4
US Billboard Hot 100	66
US Alternative Airplay (Billboard)	3
US Pop Airplay (Billboard)	31

=== Year-end charts ===
Chart (2004)	Position
UK Singles (OCC)	92
US Modern Rock Tracks (Billboard)	15

== Certifications ==
Region	Certification	Certified units/sales
Canada (Music Canada)	4× Platinum	320,000^{‡}
Denmark (IFPI Danmark)	Gold	45,000^{‡}
Italy (FIMI)	Platinum	70,000^{‡}
New Zealand (RMNZ)	4× Platinum	120,000^{‡}
Spain (Promusicae)	2× Platinum	120,000^{‡}
United Kingdom (BPI)	4× Platinum	2,400,000^{‡}
United States (RIAA)	4× Platinum	4,000,000^{‡}
^{‡} Sales+streaming figures based on certification alone.

== Release history ==
Region	Date	Format(s)	Label(s)	Ref(s).
United Kingdom	12 January 2004	7-inch vinyl; CD; DVD	Domino	
United States	12 April 2004	Alternative radio	Domino	
Australia	7 June 2004	CD	Domino	
United States	6 July 2004	Contemporary hit radio	Domino	

== Other versions ==
In 2006, an acoustic version of "Take Me Out" was recorded in Benton Harbor, Michigan, United States. This version of the song appeared as a B-side to the exclusive fan club release of "Swallow, Smile". The song was covered by the Scissor Sisters in 2004 on the B-side to their single "Mary" and "Filthy/Gorgeous". In Australia, the song received substantial airplay and was ranked number 44 on Triple J's Hottest 100 of 2004 while the original version was ranked number one.

"Weird Al" Yankovic used a portion of the song for the polka medley "Polkarama!", from his 2006 album Straight Outta Lynwood. In 2008, Ryan Lewis produced a mash-up, combining "Take Me Out" with 2Pac's "Crooked Nigga Too".

== Usage in media ==
"Take Me Out" was used in television commercials promoting the release of the PlayStation Portable in 2005. It was also featured in the trailer for the 2008 film Hancock and season 4 of the Apple TV+ series For All Mankind.

It appeared in the soundtracks for the video games Madden NFL 2005 and 26, NHL 2005, and Shaun White Skateboarding. The song was playable in the music video games Guitar Hero, Guitar Hero Smash Hits, the US version of SingStar Pop, Just Dance 2, Dance Dance Revolution Universe 2 and Rocksmith.

In 2017, the song was used in an advertisement for Ralph Lauren's Polo Red fragrance.

The song was used by Kraft Heinz, in collaboration with the NHL, in a 2026 advertisement to promote the Hockeyville program.

During the 2026 Iran war, the Israel Defense Forces posted on social media a video of airstrikes set to "Take Me Out". Kapranos condemned the song's usage, writing that "warmongering murderers are using our music without our consent".
