= Darts of Pleasure =

2003 single by Franz Ferdinand

Single by Franz Ferdinand

from the album Franz Ferdinand
- B-side: "Shopping for Blood"; "Van Tango"; "Tell Her Tonight" (demo); "Darts of Pleasure" (demo)
- Released: 8 September 2003
- Studio: Gula (Malmö, Sweden)
- Genre: Glam rock; art rock
- Length: 2:59
- Label: Domino
- Songwriters: Alex Kapranos; Nick McCarthy
- Producers: Tore Johansson; Alex Kapranos

Franz Ferdinand singles chronology
"Darts of Pleasure" (2003)	"Take Me Out" (2004)

"Darts of Pleasure" is a song by Scottish indie rock band Franz Ferdinand, released as the band's debut single in the United Kingdom on 8 September 2003 through Domino Records. In the United States, it was issued as an extended play (EP). The song entered the UK Singles Chart at number 44 on 15 September 2003, where it stayed for one week.

== History and content ==
Franz Ferdinand had first formed in 2001 consisting of Alex Kapranos, Bob Hardy, Nick McCarthy and Paul Thomson. While the band had originally planned to release the songs themselves, their underground success in the UK lead them to sign with Domino Records in 2003, who would eventually release the EP.

The band developed its reputation by supporting Hot Hot Heat and Interpol. NME editor Connor McNicholas said, "My first contact with Franz Ferdinand was when someone was playing the Darts of Pleasure demos, in the NME office, and it was genuinely one of those moments when a track goes on and I come bundling out of my office saying 'what the hell is this because this is amazing'". It was therefore no surprise the band won the "Phillip Hall Radar Award" at the NME Awards of 2004 (announced in late 2003). Furthermore, NME described the band as "The Next Big Thing" and featured the band on the front cover describing them as "The Band That Will Change Your Life".

Alex Kapranos explained to Q magazine that "the song is about seduction and the 'Darts of Pleasure' that hit you are actually words."

The song ends with several lyrics in German, most famously the line "Ich heiße Super Fantastisch!" ("My name is Super-Fantastic!", whereas "Super-Fantastic" is the name, not an adjective. Although variations in the German language occur, making the true meaning "I am called Super-Fantastic!").

== Release and reception ==
"Darts of Pleasure" was released on 8 September 2003. The single was received well with Pitchfork Media giving it a rating of 8.3, calling the single a "bombastically truncated nod to all things indie/electro/new wave. Strikingly Interpolian as they lunge in alongside a healthy drum clip, jagged guitar, and a hardboiled bassline Alex Kapranos' morose-chic vocals are coy but cool." Jon Myer of 6 Music also praised the track, calling it "a great radio record and a great debut."

== Track listings ==
Lead vocals are performed by Alex Kapranos except on "Van Tango" and "Tell Her Tonight", performed by Nick McCarthy.

UK 7-inch single

A. "Darts of Pleasure" (Kapranos, McCarthy)
B. "Shopping for Blood" (Kapranos, McCarthy, Paul Thomson)

UK CD and 12-inch single

1. "Darts of Pleasure" (Kapranos, McCarthy)
2. "Van Tango" (Kapranos, McCarthy)
3. "Shopping for Blood" (Kapranos, McCarthy, Thomson)

US CD EP

1. "Darts of Pleasure" (Kapranos, McCarthy)
2. "Van Tango" (Alex Kapranos, Nick McCarthy)
3. "Shopping for Blood" (Kapranos, McCarthy, Thomson)
4. "Tell Her Tonight" (home demo) (Kapranos, McCarthy)
5. "Darts of Pleasure" (home demo) (Kapranos, McCarthy)

== Personnel ==
- Alex Kapranos – lead vocals, guitar, production
- Bob Hardy – bass guitar, backing vocals
- Nick McCarthy – guitar, backing vocals
- Paul Thomson – drums, percussion, backing vocals
- Tore Johansson – production
- Adrian Breakspear – assistant engineering

== Charts ==
Chart (2003)	Peak position
Scotland Singles (OCC)	35
UK Singles (OCC)	44
UK Indie (OCC)	5
