= The Dark of the Matinée =

2004 single by Franz Ferdinand

Single by Franz Ferdinand

from the album Franz Ferdinand
- B-side: "Better in Hoboken"; "Forty Feet"; "Michael" (live)
- Released: 19 April 2004
- Studio: Gula (Malmö, Sweden)
- Length: 4:03
- Label: Domino
- Songwriters: Alex Kapranos; Nick McCarthy; Bob Hardy
- Producer: Tore Johansson

Franz Ferdinand singles chronology
"Take Me Out" (2004)	"The Dark of the Matinée" (2004)	"Michael" (2004)

"The Dark of the Matinée" (known as "Matinée" on single versions) is a song by Scottish indie rock band Franz Ferdinand. It was released as the third single from their eponymous debut studio album on 19 April 2004. The song reached number eight on the UK Singles Chart. In Australia, the song was ranked number 50 on Triple J's Hottest 100 of 2004.

== Background ==
The song is about walking home from Bearsden Academy fantasising about a better life in the future, telling Terry Wogan about it on UK national television, then being shaken from the fantasy as its own ridiculousness shatters its very existence. The chorus and title were inspired by bassist Bob Hardy remarking that the dark of a matinée performance was a utopian environment to play in.

== Music video ==
The video features the band dressed as schoolboys, dancing in an automatic, almost possessed, fashion and miming along to the main vocal track. It was inspired by Dennis Potter's television play Blue Remembered Hills (1979), which features adults playing children, and the lip-sync device Potter used in his 'serials with songs' Pennies from Heaven (1978) and The Singing Detective (1986). Another part of the video shows the band dressed in white clothing and standing in front of a large photograph of Terry Wogan (who is namechecked in the song).

== Track listings ==
UK CD single

1. "Matinée" (Kapranos, Nick McCarthy, Bob Hardy)
2. "Better in Hoboken" (Kapranos, McCarthy, Hardy)
3. "Forty Feet" (Kapranos, McCarthy)

UK 7-inch single

A. "Matinée" (Kapranos, McCarthy, Hardy)
B. "Michael" (live at KCRW) (Kapranos, McCarthy)

UK 12-inch single

A1. "Matinée" (Kapranos, McCarthy, Hardy)
B1. "Better in Hoboken" (Kapranos, McCarthy, Hardy)
B2. "Forty Feet" (Kapranos, McCarthy)

UK DVD single

1. "Matinée" (video)
2. "Matinée" (live at KCRW)
3. Wallpaper
4. Photo gallery with "Cheating on You" live from The Chateau)

European CD single

1. "Matinée" (Kapranos, McCarthy, Hardy)
2. "Better in Hoboken" (Kapranos, McCarthy, Hardy)

== Charts ==
=== Weekly charts ===
Chart (2004)	Peak position
Germany (GfK)	88
Netherlands (Single Top 100)	73
Ireland (IRMA)	27
Scotland Singles (OCC)	7
UK Singles (OCC)	8
UK Indie (OCC)	1

=== Year-end charts ===
Chart (2004)	Position
UK Singles (OCC)	197
