= Michael (Franz Ferdinand song) =

2004 single by Franz Ferdinand

Single by Franz Ferdinand

from the album Franz Ferdinand
- B-side: "Love and Destroy"; "Missing You"; "Don't Start"; "Tell Her Tonight"
- Released: 16 August 2004
- Studio: Gula (Malmö, Sweden)
- Genre: Glam rock; art rock
- Length: 3:21
- Label: Domino
- Songwriters: Alex Kapranos; Nick McCarthy
- Producer: Tore Johansson

Franz Ferdinand singles chronology
"The Dark of the Matinée" (2004)	"Michael" (2004)	"This Fffire" (2004)

"Michael" is a song by Scottish indie rock band Franz Ferdinand. It was released as the fourth single from their eponymous debut studio album on 16 August 2004 through Domino Records. The song was notable for its homoerotic lyrics such as "stubble on my sticky lips" and "beautiful boys on a beautiful dancefloor".

"Michael" released in multiple formats, including a 7-inch vinyl, two 12-inch vinyls, and two CDs. The second CD that was released was pulled from stores a day after its release due to chart ineligibility as it had three tracks on it instead of two, which is the allowed number of tracks for the CD2 format. It was later re-released with only two tracks. The song experienced commercial success, peaking at number 17 on the UK Singles Chart, number 39 on the Irish Singles Chart, and number 15 on the Finnish Singles Chart.

== Composition and lyrics ==
Frontman Alex Kapranos stated in an interview to the UK magazine Boyz that the song was written about two friends of his: "It was one night when me and the band were out with friends from Glasgow, and we went to this warehouse dance party thing called Disco X. It was a very debauched night and these two friends got it together in a very sexy way."

Reviewer Alexis Petridis praised the song's "intriguing combination of sly humour and bug-eyed lust, as if the song's central character started camping it up for a laugh and ended up in rather deeper water than he had anticipated...You simply don't get songs like Michael very often in current rock music."

=== Secret message ===
Franz Ferdinand - "Michael" excerpt
An excerpt of the secret message from "Michael"

The song contains a secret message from 1:35 to 1:39 saying, "She's worried about you, call your mother", if played backwards. According to "franzferdinand.net," bassist Bob Hardy was getting a bit worried about calling his mother back home, so the band added the backwards lyrics in as an homage. Hardy has said that he has no knowledge of the lyrics being there and he thought it was just a positive message to put on the track.

== Release ==
The song was released in the UK on 16 August 2004 as two CD singles and a 7-inch single. Due to a breach of UK chart rules by providing three tracks on the CD2 format instead of two, in what the band described in a press statement as a "silly schoolboy error", sales of the original CD2 format were disqualified. The disc was withdrawn within a day of release, to be replaced by the end of the week by a two-track version, omitting "Tell Her Tonight". This track was released as a free download from Franz Ferdinand and Domino Records' websites from 17 August. Despite this, the single still reached number 17 in the UK and number 39 in Ireland.

== Music video ==
The music video for "Michael" features the band members playing at an underground dance club. A man walks in and studies himself in a mirror, before joining the club. Throughout the video, the occupants are being replayed over and over as like in a short video, and show absolutely no emotion whatsoever, as the band plays. The man dances on the dance floor, but the occupants stare at him with murderous intent, and one sheds a tear, the man realizing that due to him not rewinding over and over, the occupants have found an outcast, or something of a sacrifice. The occupants form a circle around the man, and they tear out the man's arm, which emits a white beam of light, and the occupants stand in a circle as light overtakes them. The final scenes show the bands with multiple limbs. Alex Kapranos has three arms and a double-sided guitar, Nick McCarthy has two heads, Bob Hardy has four arms and two stomachs, and Paul Thomson also has three arms and plays the drum with three sticks.

== Alternative version ==
The song was recorded alternatively in May 2004 in Hamburg, Germany, as a duet, and it was originally intended for release as a single. Without changing the lyrics, the reworked track was meant to take the perspective of a male love interest and female love interest fighting over Michael. Catriona Shaw of the band Queen of Japan provided the female vocals of this version of the track. In the end the band felt that the homoerotic undertones of the song became too diluted, so decided not to use it for the release of the track as a single and stuck with the original album version.

== Track listings ==
All tracks are written by Alex Kapranos and Nick McCarthy except where noted.

UK CD1
No.	Title	Length
1.	"Michael"
2.	"Love and Destroy"
3.	"Missing You"

UK CD2
No.	Title	Length
1.	"Michael"
2.	"Don't Start"
3.	"Tell Her Tonight" (Paul sings)

- The re-issue of CD2 omits "Tell Her Tonight".

UK 7-inch single
No.	Title	Length
1.	"Michael"
2.	"Michael" (Simon Bookish version)

UK 12-inch single
No.	Title	Length
1.	"Michael"
2.	"Love and Destroy"
3.	"Don't Start"

European CD single
No.	Title	Length
1.	"Michael"
2.	"Love and Destroy"

US 12-inch single
No.	Title	Writer(s)	Length
1.	"Michael" (album version)
2.	"Dark of the Matinée" (Headman remix)	Bob Hardy; Kapranos; McCarthy
3.	"This Fire" (Playgroup remix)
4.	"Michael" (Thomas Eriksen remix)

2011 digital download
No.	Title	Length
1.	"Michael"	3:24
2.	"Love and Destroy"	3:29
3.	"Missing You"	3:12
4.	"Don't Start"	2:53
5.	"Tell Her Tonight" (Paul sings)	2:57

== Charts ==
Chart (2004)	Peak position
Finland (Suomen virallinen lista)	15
Ireland (IRMA)	39
Scotland Singles (OCC)	15
UK Singles (OCC)	17
UK Indie (OCC)	3
