= This Fire (Franz Ferdinand song) =

2004 single by Franz Ferdinand

Song by Franz Ferdinand

from the album Franz Ferdinand
- Released: 9 February 2004
- Recorded: 2003 in Scotland
- Length: 4:14
- Label: Domino
- Songwriters: Alex Kapranos; Nick McCarthy
- Producer: Franz Ferdinand

"This Fffire"

Single by Franz Ferdinand

from the album Franz Ferdinand (bonus disc edition)
- B-side: "Darts of Pleasure"; "Love and Destroy"; "Missing You"
- Released: 4 October 2004
- Length: 3:32
- Label: Domino
- Songwriters: Alex Kapranos; Nick McCarthy
- Producer: Rich Costey

Franz Ferdinand singles chronology
"Michael" (2004)	"This Fffire" (2004)	"Do You Want To" (2005)

"This Fire" is a song by Scottish indie rock band Franz Ferdinand, the seventh track on their self-titled debut album. It was written by Alex Kapranos and Nick McCarthy and produced by the band themselves at their studio in Scotland during 2003. A new version of the song, produced by Rich Costey, was released as a single on 4 October 2004, titled "This Fffire". The single artwork is based on El Lissitzky's art work Beat the Whites with the Red Wedge.

== Release and reception ==
In the United States and the United Kingdom, the song was released as a radio and download single, respectively, reaching number 17 on the US Billboard Modern Rock Tracks chart and number eight on the UK Download Chart. In Australia, the song was released as a CD single and reached number 62 on the ARIA Singles Chart. In the same country, it was ranked number 29 on Triple J's Hottest 100 of 2004.

== Music video ==
The music video, directed by Stylewar, echoes the style of 1920s-era Soviet art and propaganda (Constructivism etc.), including Cyrillic lettering, and shows the members of the band spreading a world-wide "hypnosis epidemic".

== Track listings ==
All tracks were written by Alex Kapranos and Nick McCarthy except "Missing You", written by Kapranos.

- Digital download
1. "This Fffire" (Rich Costey re-record) – 3:38
2. "This Fire" (Playgroup remix) – 8:13
- European CD single
1. "This Fffire"
2. "This Fire" (Playgroup remix)
3. "This Fffire" (video)
- Australian CD single
1. "This Fffire" (Rich Costey re-record)
2. "Love and Destroy"
3. "Missing You"

== Charts ==
=== Weekly charts ===
Weekly chart performance for "This Fffire"
Chart (2004–2005)	Peak position
Australia (ARIA)	62
Netherlands (Single Top 100)	85
UK Singles Downloads (Official Charts)	8
US Alternative Airplay (Billboard)	17

=== Year-end charts ===
Year-end chart performance for "This Fffire"
Chart (2005)	Position
US Modern Rock Tracks (Billboard)	76

== Release history ==
Release dates and formats for "This Fire"
Region	Date	Format(s)	Label(s)	Ref.
United States	4 October 2004	Alternative radio	Domino	
Australia	15 November 2004	CD	Domino	
United Kingdom	15 November 2004	Digital download	Domino	

== In popular culture ==
"This Fire" was featured on the soundtrack for the 2004 racing game Burnout 3: Takedown. The song was later sampled for "Burn This City" by Lil Wayne and Twista. In 2022, the Rich Costey version of the song was selected as the intro song to Cyberpunk: Edgerunners, the Cyberpunk 2077 tie-in anime from Studio Trigger.
