= Box Codax =

Scottish experimental rock band

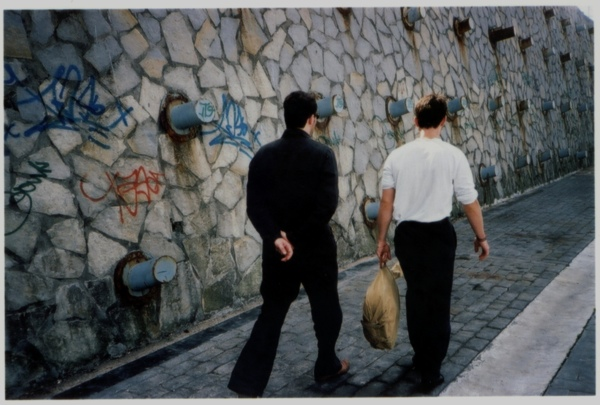
- Box Codax on tour in Spain in 2007

Background information
- Origin: Glasgow, Scotland
- Genres: Experimental
- Years active: 2003–present
- Labels: Gomma
- Members: Nick McCarthy; Manuela Gernedel; Alex Ragnew
- Website: boxcodax.com

Box Codax is a band from Glasgow, Scotland. It is made up of Nick McCarthy (formerly of the indie rock band Franz Ferdinand), Manuela Gernedel, and Alexander Ragnew.

The band's first album, Only An Orchard Away (2006), has been described as a collection of songs, often romantic and whimsical nostalgia, at other times scrappy and punky. It is an honest and genuine collection of witty pidgin English lyricism, dark humour and the award-winning song writing of a pop genius presented out of context in these lo-fi recordings.

In their second studio album, Hellabuster, which was released on 10 May 2011, the band recounts the peculiar and young life of Hellabuster in 13 episodes, with each song being accompanied by its own video. The music on Hellabuster moves between skewed disco, post punk and glam prog, and includes contributions and performances of Joseph Mount (Metronomy), Pabs Debussy (Paul Thomson), Karsten Hochapfel and many more. The videos for the songs, which were directed by UK artists (including the Turner Prize laureate Martin Creed), contributed to the eccentric album's critical acclaim. All videos episodes of Hellabuster are freely available on http://www.hellabuster.com .

Box Codax songs have been remixed by Metronomy, Naum Gabo aka Optimo, Rodion, Mock & Toof, Telonius, Den Haan and The KDMS.

== Discography ==
=== Albums ===
- Only An Orchard Away(October 2006)
- Hellabuster (May 2011)

=== Singles and EPs ===
- Boys & Girls (2005)
- Naked Smile (September 2006)
- Missed Her Kiss / Rat Boy Remixes (April 2007)
- Hellabuster / Choco Pudding (March 2011)
- Seven Silvers Remixes (June 2011)
- Where You Go / Dawning (October 2011, split-single with Martin Creed)
