= Only an Orchard Away =

Only An Orchard Away

Studio album by Box Codax
- Released: 4 September 2006
- Genre: experimental, lo-fi, electropop, indie pop, alternative
- Length: 28:39
- Label: Gomma Records
- Producer: Box Codax

Box Codax chronology
Only An Orchard Away	Hellabuster

Only an Orchard Away was the first album by the British band Box Codax; a band from Glasgow, Scotland. It is made up of Nick McCarthy of the alternative rock band Franz Ferdinand, Manuela Gernedel, and Alexander Ragnew. The album was a limited edition was released on 4 September 2006, by TheThinMan Records in the UK. It included a CD in a gatefold card format and a vinyl edition. On 2 October 2006, Gomma Records released the album in mainland Europe and the rest of the world.

The lo-fi album has been received by critics both as a total joke and as serious 'art' music. The critic Keri Kennedy concludes the album's review with: "Box Codax aren't meant for the masses, they'll either confuse or delight, depending on your state of mind."

== Track listing ==
All tracks are written by Nick McCarthy (music) and Alexander Ragnew (lyrics).

No.	Title	Length
1.	"Pollockshields Girls"	2:16
2.	"Dogs to the Beaches"	1:37
3.	"I Swam With the Otter"	2:50
4.	"Naked Smile"	2:53
5.	"Like a Rock"	2:51
6.	"Do It With Charm"	1:39
7.	"Rat Boy"	2:39
8.	"Missed Her Kiss"	3:20
9.	"Unemotional Man"	2:56
10.	"The Game"	2:04
11.	"Red Wine in Tunis"	3:34
