= FFS (band) =

2010s supergroup band

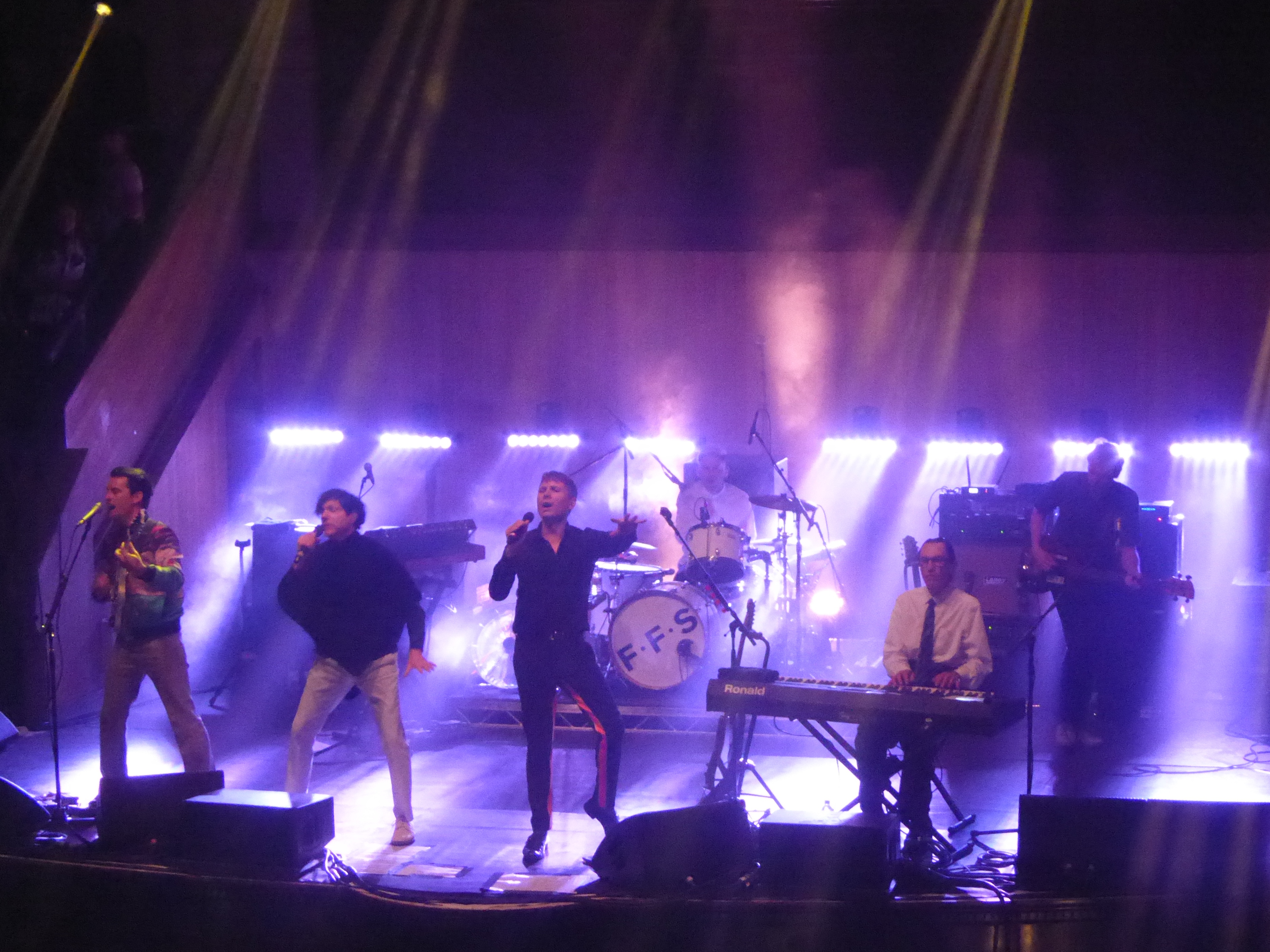
- FFS performing in 2015 at the Albert Hall in Manchester. From left to right: McCarthy, Russell Mael, Kapranos, Ron Mael (foreground), Thomson, Hardy (background).

Background information
- Genres: Indie rock; electropop; art rock; dance-rock
- Years active: 2014–2015
- Label: Domino
- Spinoff of: Franz Ferdinand; Sparks
- Past members: Alex Kapranos; Nick McCarthy; Bob Hardy; Paul Thomson; Ron Mael; Russell Mael

FFS (an abbreviation of Franz Ferdinand and Sparks) was a supergroup formed by Scottish indie rock band Franz Ferdinand and American art rock band Sparks. Their formation was announced on 9 March 2015, but the two bands had been recording since at least the mid-2000s. The group's eponymous debut studio album was recorded in late 2014 and released through the Domino Recording Company in the UK on 8 June and in the US on 9 June 2015.

== History ==
=== Pre-formation (2004) ===
Franz Ferdinand and Sparks originally began working on music together in 2004, shortly after the release of Franz Ferdinand's eponymous debut studio album, when it was discovered that the two bands were fans of each other. They had sent each other a few demos, one of which was "Piss Off", the twelfth track on FFS, but the two bands were busy with other activities and they were not able to fully record an album together. Sparks' demo recording of "Piss Off" was released on their greatest hits collection Past Tense: The Best of Sparks in 2019.

=== Formation and FFS (2014–2015) ===
In 2013, it was announced that the two bands were both performing at the 2013 Coachella Valley Music and Arts Festival. While searching for a dentist in San Francisco, Alex Kapranos, the lead singer of Franz Ferdinand, was found by Ron and Russell Mael of Sparks. The Mael brothers invited the band to watch their set at the festival, and later, the two bands agreed that it was time to record an album together. On 9 March 2015, it was announced that Franz Ferdinand and Sparks had formed a supergroup together by the name of FFS.

On 1 April, it was announced that the band would be releasing their eponymous debut studio album on 8 June in the UK and 9 June 2015 in the US FFS was recorded at RAK Studios in London during a 15-day period in late 2014. It was also produced by Grammy Award-winning music producer John Congleton. FFS was released to a positive critical and commercial success.

In support of the album, FFS appeared on the BBC television show Later with Jools Holland on May 21, 2015 (season 46, episode 4).

=== Disbandment ===
Franz Ferdinand and Sparks returned to working on their separate projects. Sparks released the album Hippopotamus in September 2017, with Franz Ferdinand's Always Ascending following in February 2018. FFS marked the last participation of Nick McCarthy alongside members of Franz Ferdinand, before he left the band due to family commitments. Alex Kapranos has publicly stated in multiple occasions that Franz Ferdinand has no intention to resume the band's activities.

== Members ==
- Russell Mael – lead and backing vocals
- Alex Kapranos – lead and backing vocals, guitars, occasional keyboards
- Nick McCarthy – guitars, keyboards, backing and occasional lead vocals
- Ron Mael – keyboards, backing vocals
- Bob Hardy – bass, backing vocals
- Paul Thomson – drums, backing vocals

== Discography ==
=== Studio albums ===
List of albums, with selected chart positions
Title	Album details	Peak chart positions									
Title	Album details	UK	AUS	AUT	BEL (VL)	BEL (WA)	FRA	GER	NLD	SCO	SWI
FFS	Released: 9 June 2015; Label: Domino; Formats: CD, 2×LP, digital download	17	85	36	44	32	27	22	13	8	19

=== Singles ===
List of singles, with selected chart positions
Title	Year	Peak chart positions	Album
Title	Year	BEL (VL)	Album
"Johnny Delusional"	2015	140	FFS
"Call Girl"	2015	—	FFS
"Police Encounters"	2015	—	FFS
"—" denotes a recording that did not chart or was not released in that territory.

=== Promotional singles ===
List of promotional singles
Title	Year	Album
"Piss Off"	2015	FFS
"Collaborations Don't Work"	2015	FFS
