= Audrey Tait =

Scottish drummer and music producer

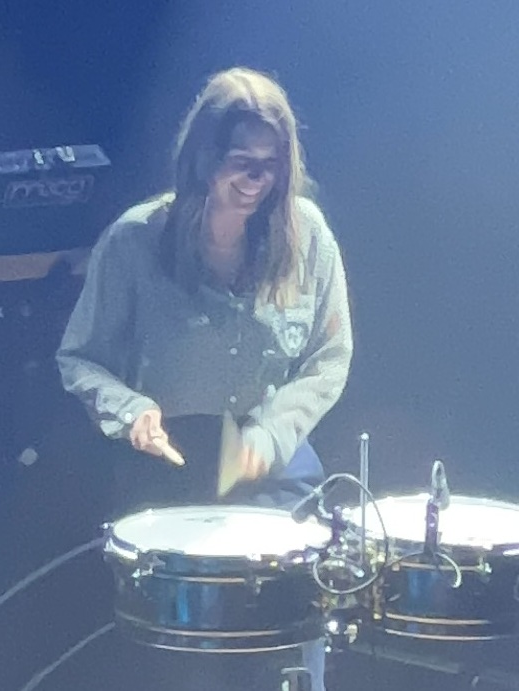
- Tait in 2022

Background information
- Born: September 2, 1987 (age 38); Rutherglen, South Lanarkshire, Scotland
- Genres: hip hop, indie rock
- Instrument: Drums
- Website: https://novasound.net

Audrey Tait (born 1987) is a Scottish musician and music producer from Rutherglen, Scotland. She is known for being the drummer in three Glaswegian bands, the experimental hip-hop group Hector Bizerk, Broken Chanter, and the rock band Franz Ferdinand. She replaced Paul Thomson in Franz Ferdinand, receiving a symbolic set of drumsticks from him in October 2021.

She also performs in the synthpop duo The Girl Who Cried Wolf, the folk rock duo The Miss's, and in the scoring partnership Novasound, which scores and produces theater and film soundtracks in Glasgow.

== Hector Bizerk ==
Hector Bizerk started in 2011 as a two-piece band, featuring rapper Louie Boy and Tait on drums. As the band's sound and ambition got richer, it became a four-piece, adding a bassist and keyboardist. Tait produced and mixed all the band's releases. Their second album, Nobody Seen Nothing, was nominated for the Scottish Album of the Year Award in 2014, and were named Best Hip Hop Act at that year's Scottish Alternative Music Awards. Their next album, The Waltz of Modern Psychiatry, was also nominated for album of the year.

While in Hector Bizerk, Tait began producing other artists. In 2014, she made it to the finals of Hit Like a Girl, an international contest for female drummers.

== Franz Ferdinand ==
After Thomson told Franz Ferdinand that he was leaving the band in September 2021, the band's Julian Corrie offered Tait a chance to be Thomson's replacement. Thomson came to the first rehearsals to help Tait acclimate herself to the drum parts. On 29 September 2021, the first concert they played together was a fashion show for Balmain, a gig she described as "a bit ridiculous for us all." The first song the band released with Tait was "Billy Goodbye," from its greatest hits album Hits to the Head, which came out in March 2022.

Franz Ferdinand announced Tait's arrival by saying, "After having played with Paul for so long, it’s obvious that not just anyone could sit behind the kit in FF, so we’re happy to say that one of the other best drummers in the world is joining us. Many of you in Glasgow will already know what an incredible musician Audrey Tait is and we’re thrilled to have her join us. It feels totally natural playing with her and she’s a great laugh."

== Personal life ==
Tait grew up in Rutherglen, Scotland, and attended Stonelaw High School.

Tait is a fan of the football club Celtic F.C.
