= Franz Ferdinand (album) =

2004 album by Franz Ferdinand

Studio album by Franz Ferdinand
- Released: 9 February 2004
- Recorded: June–July 2003
- Studio: Gula (Malmö)
- Genres: Post-punk revival; dance-punk
- Length: 38:49
- Label: Domino
- Producers: Tore Johansson; Franz Ferdinand

Franz Ferdinand chronology
Franz Ferdinand (2004)	You Could Have It So Much Better (2005)

Singles from Franz Ferdinand
- 1. "Darts of Pleasure" Released: 8 September 2003; 2. "Take Me Out" Released: 12 January 2004; 3. "The Dark of the Matinée" Released: 19 April 2004; 4. "Michael" Released: 16 August 2004; 5. "This Fire" Released: 4 October 2004

Franz Ferdinand is the debut studio album by Scottish indie rock band Franz Ferdinand, first released on 9 February 2004 through the Domino Recording Company. It was recorded during 2003 at Gula Studios in Malmö, Sweden, with Tore Johansson, who produced the majority of the album, with two tracks produced by the band themselves. It entered the UK Albums Chart at number three in February 2004 and contains the UK top ten singles "Take Me Out" and "The Dark of the Matinée" as well as UK top 20 hit "Michael".

Franz Ferdinand won the 2004 Mercury Music Prize and was nominated for Best Alternative Album at the 47th Annual Grammy Awards. The album has since sold over 3.6 million copies worldwide, with over 1.27 million copies in the United Kingdom and at least 1 million copies in the US (corresponding to Platinum).

== Reception ==
=== Critical ===
Professional ratings
Aggregate scores
Source	Rating
Metacritic	87/100
Review scores
Source	Rating
AllMusic	5/5 stars
Blender	4/5 stars
The Guardian	5/5 stars
Los Angeles Times	3.5/4 stars
Mojo	4/5 stars
NME	9/10
Pitchfork	9.1/10
Q	4/5 stars
Rolling Stone	3.5/5 stars
Uncut	5/5 stars

Franz Ferdinand received universal critical acclaim, holding a score of 87 out of 100 on review aggregator site Metacritic, indicating "universal acclaim", based on 31 reviews. Simon Fernand of BBC Music wrote that Franz Ferdinand "may not be a particularly long album, but it is a masterpiece of funky, punky, suave cool from the first track to the last." Anthony Thornton of NME cited Franz Ferdinand as the latest act in a line of art school rock bands with "the absolute conviction that rock 'n' roll is more than a career option" and praised the album as "the latest and most intoxicating example of the wonderful pushing its way up between the ugly slabs of Pop Idol, nu metal and Britons aping American bands." Heather Phares of AllMusic said that Franz Ferdinand "ends up being rewarding in different ways than the band's previous work was, and it's apparent that they're one of the more exciting groups to come out of the garage rock/post-punk revival." Robert Christgau of The Village Voice gave the album a three-star honorable mention rating and quipped of the band: "Young enough to only work when they need the money, a musical tradition worth fighting for".

Franz Ferdinand is included in the book 1001 Albums You Must Hear Before You Die and was placed at number two on Planet Sound's Best Albums of 2004 list. Clash placed "Franz Ferdinand" at No.14 in its list of the top albums from 2004 to 2009. Online music magazine Pitchfork placed Franz Ferdinand at number 101 on their list of top 200 albums of the 2000s.

=== Commercial ===
Franz Ferdinand had a positive commercial performance. The album entered the UK albums chart at number 3 in February 2004 and at number 12 on the Australian ARIA albums chart in April 2004. The album entered the Billboard 200 on 26 April 2004, and climbed slowly, peaking at number 32 in December 2004.

== Track listing ==
All tracks are written by Alex Kapranos and Nick McCarthy, unless noted otherwise. All tracks are produced by Tore Johansson except "Tell Her Tonight" and "This Fire", produced by Franz Ferdinand.

Auf Achse (TV series) is a German truck driver series.

Franz Ferdinand (standard edition)
No.	Title	Writer(s)	Length
1.	"Jacqueline"	Kapranos, McCarthy, Bob Hardy	3:49
2.	"Tell Her Tonight"		2:17
3.	"Take Me Out"		3:57
4.	"The Dark of the Matinée"	Kapranos, McCarthy, Hardy	4:03
5.	"Auf Achse"		4:19
6.	"Cheating on You"		2:36
7.	"This Fire"		4:14
8.	"Darts of Pleasure"		2:59
9.	"Michael"		3:21
10.	"Come on Home"		3:46
11.	"40'"		3:24
Total length:			38:49

Franz Ferdinand (limited edition bonus disc - live at the Paradiso, Amsterdam, 07/11/2003)
No.	Title	Length
1.	"Cheating on You"
2.	"Jacqueline"
3.	"Tell Her Tonight"
4.	"Shopping for Blood"
5.	"Take Me Out"
6.	"Love and Destroy"
7.	"Truck Stop"
8.	"This Fire"
9.	"Michael"
10.	"Darts of Pleasure"

All tracks are written by Alex Kapranos and Nick McCarthy, except when noted.

Franz Ferdinand (limited edition bonus disc)
No.	Title	Writer(s)	Length
1.	"This Fffire"		3:32
2.	"Van Tango"		3:26
3.	"Shopping for Blood"	Kapranos, McCarthy, Paul Thomson	3:34
4.	"All for You, Sophia"	Kapranos, McCarthy, Hardy	3:00
5.	"Words So Leisured"		2:18

== Personnel ==
Credits adapted from the album's CD cover and liner notes, except where noted.

Franz Ferdinand

- Alex Kapranos – lead vocals, guitar
- Nick McCarthy – guitar, backing vocals, keyboards
- Bob Hardy – bass guitar
- Paul Thomson – drums

Artwork

- Vivian Lewis – back cover
- Joe Dilworth – band photo
- Roxanne Clifford – black and white photo
- Martin Clark – label photo
- Franz Ferdinand and Matthew Cooper – other artwork

Production

- Tore Johansson – producer
- Franz Ferdinand – producer (2, 7)
- Jens Lindgård – engineer
- Stefan Kvarnström – engineer
- Steve Rooke – mastering (Abbey Road)

== Charts ==
=== Weekly charts ===
2004–2005 weekly chart performance for Franz Ferdinand
Chart (2004–2005)	Peak position
Australian Albums (ARIA)	12
Austrian Albums (Ö3 Austria)	26
Belgian Albums (Ultratop Flanders)	7
Belgian Albums (Ultratop Wallonia)	22
Canadian Albums (Nielsen SoundScan)	31
Danish Albums (Hitlisten)	24
Dutch Albums (Album Top 100)	18
European Albums (Billboard)	13
Finnish Albums (Suomen virallinen lista)	13
French Albums (SNEP)	26
German Albums (Offizielle Top 100)	16
Greek Albums (IFPI)	29
Irish Albums (IRMA)	2
Italian Albums (FIMI)	56
Japanese Albums (Oricon)	18
New Zealand Albums (RMNZ)	5
Norwegian Albums (VG-lista)	11
Scottish Albums (Official Charts)	2
Spanish Albums (Promusicae)	93
Swedish Albums (Sverigetopplistan)	16
Swiss Albums (Schweizer Hitparade)	35
UK Albums (Official Charts)	3
UK Independent Albums (Official Charts)	1
US Billboard 200	32
US Independent Albums (Billboard)	5

2009 weekly chart performance for Franz Ferdinand
Chart (2009)	Peak position
Spanish Albums (Promusicae)	45

=== Year-end charts ===
2004 year-end chart performance for Franz Ferdinand
Chart (2004)	Position
Australian Albums (ARIA)	51
Belgian Albums (Ultratop Flanders)	41
Belgian Albums (Ultratop Wallonia)	96
Dutch Albums (Album Top 100)	71
French Albums (SNEP)	84
German Albums (Offizielle Top 100)	90
New Zealand Albums (RMNZ)	25
UK Albums (OCC)	17
US Billboard 200	111

2005 year-end chart performance for Franz Ferdinand
Chart (2005)	Position
French Albums (SNEP)	119
UK Albums (OCC)	45

== Certifications ==
Certifications and sales for Franz Ferdinand
Region	Certification	Certified units/sales
Australia (ARIA)	Platinum	70,000^{^}
Belgium (BRMA)	Gold	25,000^{*}
Canada (Music Canada)	2× Platinum	200,000^{‡}
Denmark (IFPI Danmark)	Gold	20,000^{^}
Germany (BVMI)	Gold	100,000^{^}
New Zealand (RMNZ)	2× Platinum	30,000^{^}
Norway (IFPI Norway)	Gold	20,000^{*}
United Kingdom (BPI)	4× Platinum	1,290,000
United States (RIAA)	Platinum	1,000,000^{^}
Summaries
Europe (IFPI)	Platinum	1,000,000^{*}
^{*} Sales figures based on certification alone.^{^} Shipments figures based on certification alone.^{‡} Sales+streaming figures based on certification alone.
