= Hector Bizerk =

2011–2016 Scottish hip hop band

- Origin: Scotland
- Genres: Alternative hip hop
- Years active: 2011–2016
- Members: John Louis; Audrey Tait; Tom Dallas; David Calder; Paul Crawford
- Past members: Fraser Sneddon; Jennifer Muir
- Website: http://www.hectorbizerk.com

Hector Bizerk were an experimental hip-hop group from Glasgow, Scotland, featuring drummer Audrey Tait and rapper Louie. Formed in 2011, they were initially a duo. However later recordings saw them add Jennifer Muir (Synth, Percussion, Vocals) and Fraser Sneddon (Bass). They have released five EPs and three albums, and their 2014 EP The Bird That Never Flew features guest vocals from Scotland's Makar Liz Lochhead.

Their 2015 LP The Waltz of Modern Psychiatry was written as a soundtrack to Birds of Paradise Theatre Company's periodic play about the life of Jane Avril. Both the play and album have recovered widespread critical acclaim.

They have been a regular feature of the UK's festival circuit since 2012. That summer saw the newly expanded quartet play the BBC Introducing stage at T In The Park and The Solus Tent at The Wickerman Festival. They would later be asked to return to T in the Park to play the T Break stage in 2013. Coverage of their first performance at T In The Park was broadcast on BBC television's festival highlights of 2012. The band have also played the Insider Festival, Go North, Eden, Doune The Rabbit Hole, Audio Soup, Live at Troon, Knockengorroch, and Glasgow's West End Festival.

In 2015 they toured United States, particularly gaining plaudits at SXSW in Austin, Texas. Tait and Louie were appointed musical director for Birds of Paradise Theatre Company production Crazy Jane. Subsequently releasing concept album The Waltz of Modern Psychiatry.

Hector Bizerk have supported a number of well known hip hop artists including Grandmaster Flash, Wu Tang Clan, Alt-J, MF Doom, EPMD, Immortal Technique and Jurassic 5.

== Career ==
=== Early EPs ===
The self-titled Hector Bizerk EP was self recorded, and released on 5 June 2011.

The initial launch of Hector Bizerk was a sold out show at 13th Note in King Street, Glasgow. Their first national radio play came as the song 'Burst Love' was picked up by Ally McCrae at BBC Radio One. The track was later selected as BBC Introducing's Track of the Month.

The Living Off Rhyme EP was again self released, and came out on 8 November 2011. It features the first appearance of Jennifer Muir, as guest vocalist on 'Hiatus'.

Living Off Rhyme was officially released with a live session on BBC Introducing. The session first introduced Alt-J to Hector Bizerk who later requested Hector Bizerk to play alongside them.

=== Drums. Rap. Yes. ===
In 2012, the band played the BBC Introducing stage at T In the Park.

The band's debut studio recording was released on 13 August 2012. It was received well by critics, and achieved national radio play on BBC Radio 1.

The launch of Drums.Rap.Yes took place in King Tut's Wah Wah Hut. The show was included in The Evening Times' top ten gigs of 2012.

=== Nobody Seen Nothing ===
Following the release of Drums. Rap. Yes. the band were asked to play the T Break stage at T in the Park in 2013, one of around 100 live shows played that year.

The band's second full length recording was released at an event the band called 'The Hectember Weekend' on 21 and 22 September 2013. To the original line up of Audrey and Louie were added Jennifer Muir (synth, vocal) and Fraser Sneddon (bass). As with Drums. Rap. Yes. the album was received well critically, and was later shortlisted for the Scottish Album of the Year Award in 2014.

=== Later EPs ===
In September 2014, the band released The Fish That Never Swam (EP), followed by The Bird That Never Flew (EP) in November 2014. The titles of these EPs are a reference to Glasgow's coat of arms and the Miracles of St Mungo.

The second EP was released at an event at The Poetry Club in Glasgow.

The EP was accompanied by a film based on the work of Pearl Kinnear, who designed their logo and often produces artwork onstage during their live shows. However the EP is particularly notable for the appearance of Liz Lochhead on the track 'Trouble is not a Place'.

In January 2015 it was announced that the band would perform at South by Southwest 2015, with support from Creative Scotland, along with other Scottish artists including The Twilight Sad and Roddy Hart & The Lonesome Fire.

February 2015 saw the release of The Bell That Never Rang EP, the third instalment of the bands Glasgow Series, based in the tales of St Mungo.

In April 2016, the band released the last of the four "Glasgow EPs," entitled The Tree That Never Grew. This EP was notable for its collaborations, including with RM Hubbert on the title track, Be Charlotte on "Empty Jackets" and Pronto Mama vocalist Marc Rooney on two tracks.

Tracks from The Fish That Never Swam, The Bell That Never Rang and The Tree That Never Grew were subsequently compiled on the band's final album "The Second City Of The Empire," released in April 2016.

== Awards ==
The band won the 2014 Best Hip Hop Award at the Scottish Alternative Music Awards, and were shortlisted for the 2014 Scottish Album of the Year Award, alongside CHVRCHES, Mogwai and Biffy Clyro. Audrey was a finalist in the 2014 international Hit Like A Girl competition for female drummers, coming 12th overall.

== Logo and Artwork ==
=== Pearl Kinnear ===
The Hector Bizerk logo and Nobody Seen Nothing artwork are by Scottish visual artist Pearl Kinnear, with whom the band have a long relationship.

Kinnear studied to gain her B.A. (Hons) at Duncan of Jordanstone College of Art, Dundee and went on to complete an MFA at Belfast College of Art.

== Discography ==
=== Hector Bizerk EP (September 2011) ===
No.	Title	Length
1.	"Fat Cat"
2.	"For The Record"
3.	"Niche"
4.	"Burst Love"
5.	"Banksy Did It"

=== Living Off Rhyme EP (November 2011) ===
No.	Title	Length
1.	"Tsunami"
2.	"Man Up"
3.	"Hiatus"
4.	"The Rhythm Theory"
5.	"Train of Thought"

=== Drums. Rap. Yes. (August 2012) ===
No.	Title	Length
1.	"Drums. Rap. Yes."
2.	"Burst Love"
3.	"Rabbit Punch"
4.	"Niche II"
5.	"Man Up"
6.	"Sometimes I Wonder"
7.	"Bury the Hatchet"
8.	"For the Record"
9.	"Needs Wants and Lies"
10.	"Dig it Up"
11.	"Let it Go"
12.	"What You Hoping For (Feat. Michelle Low)"
13.	"The Rhythm Theory"

=== Nobody Seen Nothing (February 2014) ===
No.	Title	Length
1.	"Orchestrate"	4:27
2.	"Fingerprints on the Drumkit"	3:15
3.	"Welcome to Nowhere"	4:40
4.	"Party at A&E"	4:29
5.	"Waste Britain"	3:35
6.	"Seldom a Word We Don't Say too Often"	4:34
7.	"An Assortment of Idiots (Shut Your Mouth)"	3:41
8.	"Milky Way"	1:36
9.	"Columbus"	3:50
10.	"Police State"	3:14
11.	"My Little Bigots"	4:17
12.	"Espagne in the Works"	3:19
13.	"Adopt a Persona"	7:19

=== The Fish That Never Swam EP (September 2014) ===
No.	Title	Length
1.	"BT Phone Home"	4:27
2.	"The Bigger Picture"	3:04
3.	"Little Man Says"	3:42
4.	"The Fish That Never Swam"	4:11

=== The Bird That Never Flew EP (November 2014) ===
No.	Title	Length
1.	"A Pearl Paints a Thousand Pictures"
2.	"People Make Glasgow"
3.	"Trouble is Not a Place (Feat. Liz Lochhead)"
4.	"Eton Feast"
