= Hellabuster =

Studio album by Box Codax
- Released: 10 May 2011
- Genre: Electropop, indie pop, alternative, New Wave
- Length: 49:12
- Label: Gomma Records
- Producer: Nick McCarthy

Box Codax chronology
Only An Orchard Away (2006)	Hellabuster (2011)

Hellabuster is the second studio album by the band Box Codax, released in the United Kingdom on 10 May 2011. In the first full-length release since their album Only An Orchard Away in 2006, Box Codax tell the peculiar and young life of Hellabuster in 13 episodes, with each song being accompanied by its own video.

== Critical reception ==
Professional ratings
Review scores
Source	Rating
NME	(7/10)
Kemp's Record Reviews	(10/10)
The Daily Telegraph	3/5 stars
Subba Cultcha	(7/10)
The Independent	(favourable)
Incendiary Magazine	(favourable)

The NME awarded the album for its disco-prog eccentricity 7/10, with Emily Mackay of NME writing about the album: "the whole is an eccentric gem that pulls you back again and again." The songs, which move between skewed disco, post punk and glammier studio prog were accentuated by 13 videos, proving their artistic approach to music and the originality of the band. The video for the stripped-down acoustic song "Dawning", directed by Turner Prize winning artist Martin Creed, received much critical acclaim.

== Singles ==
- "Hellabuster / Choco Pudding" was released as the lead single from the album in March 2011.
- "Seven Silver Remixes" was released as the second single / EP in June 2011.
- "Where You Go / Dawning" was released in October 2011 as a split-single together with artist Martin Creed. The limited vinyl single is featuring hand painted artwork by Martin Creed.

== Track listing ==
All tracks are written by Nick McCarthy (music), Manuela Gernedel (lyrics) and Alexander Ragnew (lyrics).

No.	Title	Length
1.	"Hellabuster"	4:11
2.	"Seven Silvers"	4:44
3.	"Radical Plains"	3:10
4.	"Choco Pudding"	2:48
5.	"Pour Moi"	4:02
6.	"I Won't Come Back"	3:08
7.	"Charade"	3:12
8.	"Nothing More Than Anything"	4:32
9.	"Sandy Moffat"	3:05
10.	"Inanimate Inamorato"	4:12
11.	"My Room"	4:21
12.	"No Trains"	3:57
13.	"Dawning"	3:56

== Personnel ==
Band

- Manuela Gernedel
- Alexander Ragnew
- Nick McCarthy
