= Franz Ferdinand (band) =

Scottish rock band

- Franz Ferdinand performing in Boston in 2026; From left: Dino Bardot, Julian Corrie, Alex Kapranos, Audrey Tait, and Bob Hardy

Background information
- Origin: Glasgow, Scotland
- Genres: Indie rock; post-punk revival; dance-punk; art rock; art punk
- Works: Discography
- Years active: 2002–present
- Label: Domino
- Spinoffs: FFS
- Spinoff of: The Yummy Fur
- Members: Alex Kapranos; Bob Hardy; Dino Bardot; Julian Corrie; Audrey Tait
- Past members: Nick McCarthy; Paul Thomson
- Website: franzferdinand.com

Franz Ferdinand are a Scottish rock band formed in Glasgow in 2002. Their original line-up was composed of Alex Kapranos (lead vocals, guitar, keyboards), Nick McCarthy (guitar, keyboards, vocals), Bob Hardy (bass) and Paul Thomson (drums, percussion, backing vocals). Julian Corrie (keyboards, guitar, backing vocals) and Dino Bardot (guitar, backing vocals) joined the band in 2017 after McCarthy left during the previous year, and Audrey Tait (drums, percussion) joined the band after Thomson left in 2021. The band were categorised as a post-punk revival band, and garnered multiple UK top 20 hits in the 2000s. They have been nominated for several Grammy Awards and have received two Brit Awards—winning one for Best British Group—as well as one NME Award.

The band's 2003 debut single, "Darts of Pleasure", narrowly missed the top 40 of the UK Singles Chart, peaking at number 44, but their second single that same year, "Take Me Out", yielded their commercial breakthrough, peaking at number three. "Take Me Out" charted in several other countries and earned a Grammy nomination for Best Rock Performance by a Duo or Group with Vocal; it became the band's signature song. Their debut album Franz Ferdinand won the 2004 Mercury Prize and earned a Grammy nomination for Best Alternative Album.

In 2005, the band released their second studio album, You Could Have It So Much Better, produced by Rich Costey. It peaked within the top-ten in multiple countries and earned Grammy-nominations for Best Alternative Album and for one of the singles, "Do You Want To". The band's third studio album, Tonight: Franz Ferdinand, was released in January 2009; by then the band had shifted from a post-punk-focused sound to a more dance-oriented sound. A remix album of Tonight, titled Blood, was released in July 2009.

Four years after the release of Tonight, the band released their fourth studio album, Right Thoughts, Right Words, Right Action, in August 2013. In 2015, Franz Ferdinand and American rock band Sparks formed the supergroup FFS and released a one-off album, FFS, in June 2015. The band underwent multiple line-up changes following FFS, beginning with McCarthy's departure in 2016. After acquiring Corrie and Bardot, the band released their fifth studio album Always Ascending in February 2018. Thomson departed in 2021 and was replaced by Tait. The band's sixth studio album, The Human Fear, was released in January 2025 to commercial success.

== History ==
=== Formation (2001–2003) ===
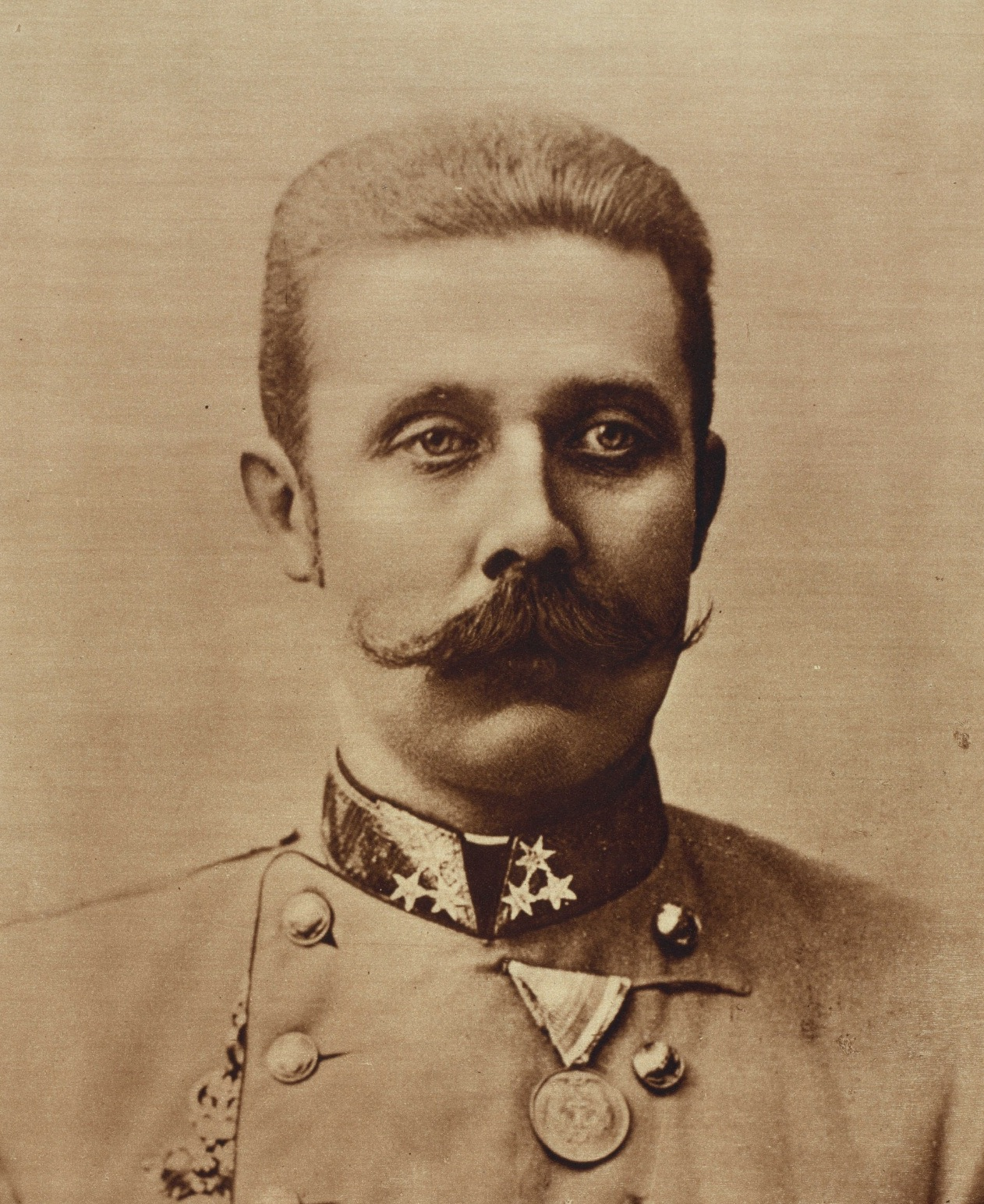
The Archduke Franz Ferdinand of Austria inspired the band's name.

The band's members played in various bands during the 1990s, including The Karelia, Yummy Fur, 10p Invaders, and Embryo. Alex Kapranos and Paul Thomson met at a party and began a close friendship and played together in Yummy Fur, and subsequently teamed up to write songs. Around the same time, Kapranos taught his friend Bob Hardy how to play bass after being given a bass by Mick Cooke of Belle & Sebastian. Kapranos met guitarist Nick McCarthy, who had returned to Scotland after studying jazz bass in Germany, in 2001.

Once the members came together, they settled on the name Franz Ferdinand for their band. The name was originally inspired by a racehorse called Archduke Ferdinand. After seeing the horse win the Northumberland Plate in 2001, the band began to discuss Archduke Franz Ferdinand and thought it would be a good band name because of the alliteration of the name and the implications of the Archduke's death: his assassination was a significant factor in the lead-up to World War I. In an interview, Hardy recollected that "mainly we just liked the way it sounded. We liked the alliteration." Kapranos continued, saying "he was an incredible figure as well. His life, or at least the ending of it, was the catalyst for the complete transformation of the world and that is what we want our music to be. But I don't want to over-intellectualise the name thing. Basically a name should just sound good ... like music." Thomson concluded, saying “I like the idea that, if we become popular, maybe the words Franz Ferdinand will make people think of the band instead of the historical figure.”

=== Franz Ferdinand and international breakthrough (2003–2005) ===
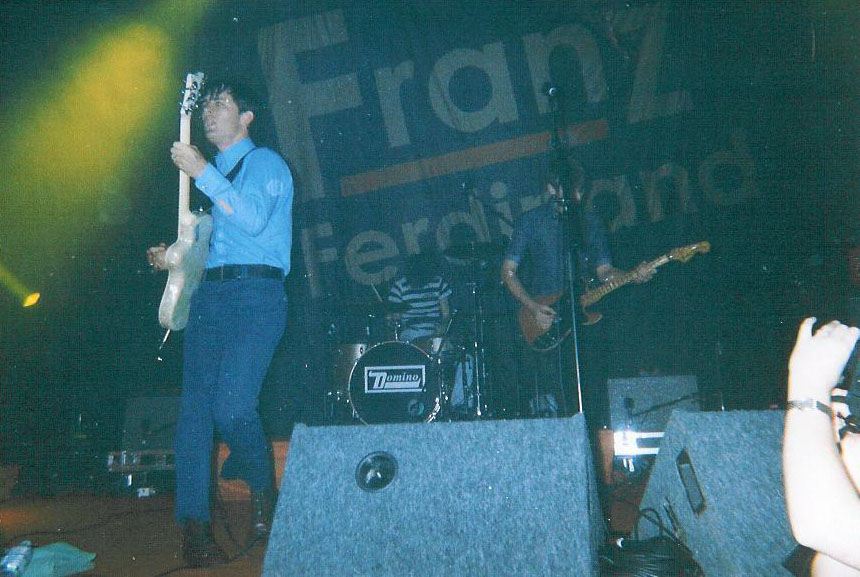
The band performing in 2004

In May 2003 the band signed to Laurence Bell's independent record label, Domino Recording Company. The band moved to Gula Studios in Malmö, Sweden, with Cardigans producer Tore Johansson to record their debut album. In the latter part of 2003, the band released their debut single, "Darts of Pleasure". In January 2004, the single "Take Me Out" reached No. 3 in the UK charts. The album, Franz Ferdinand, was released in early 2004, debuting at No. 3 in the UK Albums Chart in February 2004, and at No. 12 in the Australian album charts in April 2004.

The album only reached the lowest levels of the Billboard 200 album charts in the US as of early 2004, but reached the top 5 of the indie rock chart and the Heatseeker chart for debut artists. After a couple of North American tours and heavy rotation of the "Take Me Out" video on MTV, the album eventually reached No. 32 on the Billboard 200 later in 2004, and sold over a million copies in the United States. Franz Ferdinand received a generally strong positive response from critics. NME rated it 9 out of 10, and said that the band was the latest in the line of art school rock bands featuring the Beatles, The Rolling Stones, The Who, Roxy Music, the Sex Pistols, Wire, Travis and Blur.

On 7 September 2004, the album was awarded the 2004 Mercury Music Prize. "Take Me Out" gained first place in the Australian Triple J Hottest 100 for 2004, winning more than twice the votes of the second-place entry, with This Fire and The Dark of the Matinee entering at No. 24 and No. 50 respectively. Franz Ferdinand won an Ivor Novello Award in 2004 and two Brit Awards in 2005. The avant-garde music video for "Take Me Out" earned them a Breakthrough Video MTV Award. NME named Franz Ferdinand the best album of 2004, and placed it 38th on their 100 Best Albums of All Time list.

The band performed "Take Me Out" as a live medley with Los Lonely Boys, Maroon 5, The Black Eyed Peas and Gwen Stefani at the 47th Annual Grammy Awards in 2005, in which "Take Me Out" was nominated for Best Rock Performance by a Duo or Group with Vocal and Franz Ferdinand was nominated for Best Alternative Album. "Take Me Out" was featured on the video games NHL 2005, Madden NFL 2005 and the breakthrough game Guitar Hero. The album has sold around 3.6 million copies worldwide.

=== You Could Have It So Much Better (2005–2007) ===
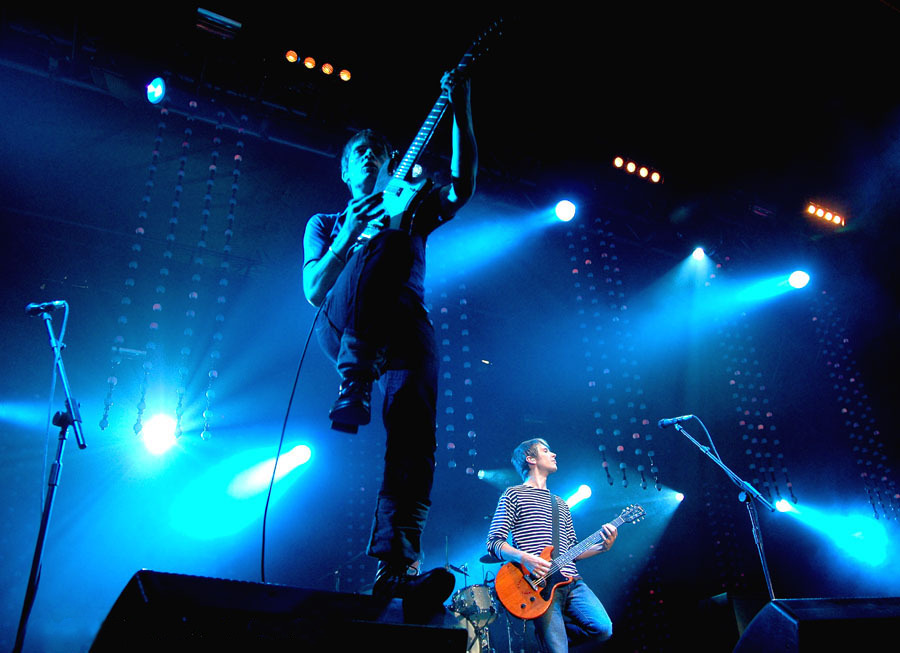
Franz Ferdinand performing live in Dundee, Scotland in 2006

The band spent much of 2005 in the studio in Glasgow working on their follow-up album, You Could Have It So Much Better, which was released on 3 October 2005. The band initially intended to leave the album self-titled like their debut, but they changed it to You Could Have It So Much Better...With Franz Ferdinand before settling on the final title. The album's cover design was modelled on Alexander Rodchenko's 1924 portrait of Lilya Brik. The band attempted to broaden its musical range on the album; Hardy said, "There's more to life than disco-beat guitar music". It was generally well received in the press and seen as an album equal to, or better than, their first by most critics. It entered the UK Album Charts at Number 1 and the US charts at Number 8. The album eventually sold 2 million copies worldwide.

To support the album, four singles were released. Included in that set is a double A-side single that contained a video-clip-only single as well (both the AA-side "L. Wells" and the video-clip "Jeremy Fraser" are not featured on the album, recorded in early 2006 during the band's tour of Australia in support of the album). Also included is another video-clip-only single called "Wine, In the Afternoon" which is the B-side to "Eleanor Put Your Boots On", and was also not featured on the album, but recorded on tour in Michigan. "Do You Want To" made it to number 4 and was declared by Q to be the greatest single of 2005, while "Walk Away" and "The Fallen" entered the top 15 of the UK Singles Chart. The fourth and final single from the second album, "Eleanor Put Your Boots On", peaked at number 30. You Could Have It So Much Better went on to earn a nomination for Best Alternative Album at the 48th Annual Grammy Awards in 2006, as did "Do You Want To" for Best Rock Performance by a Duo or Group with Vocal.

=== Tonight: Franz Ferdinand (2007–2011) ===
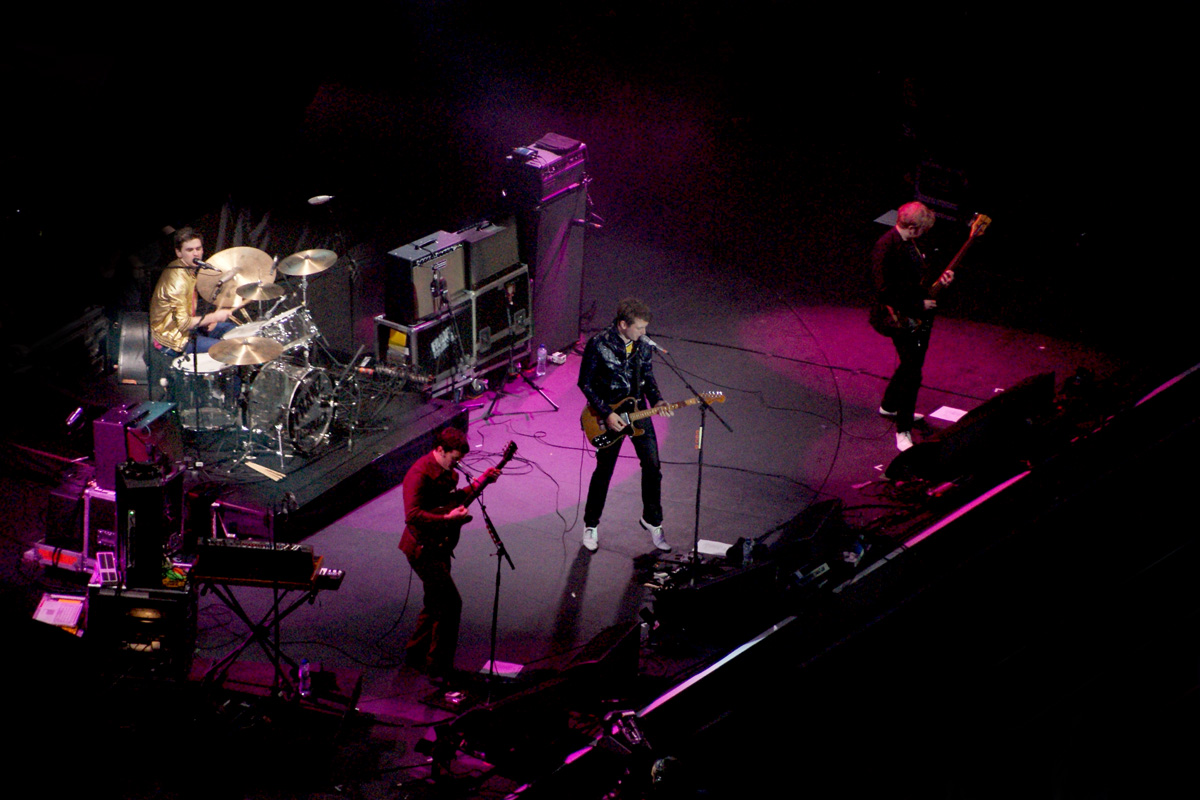
The band performing live in 2009

On 26 January 2009, the band released their third studio album, Tonight: Franz Ferdinand, which they had been recording in Glasgow since mid-2007. The band recorded the album in a disused building in Glasgow that had been a town hall in the past. Alex Kapranos has stated that "The last record was...like a teenager having sex. This one's a bit more assured and a bit friendlier for the dance floor." Tonight was mixed by Canadian Mix Engineer Mike Fraser.

The song "Ulysses" was chosen to be the first single and was released on 19 January 2009. It was first played by Zane Lowe on 17 November 2008. Shortly afterwards it hit YouTube. It did not see that much success in the UK Top 40, reaching only No. 20, but it fared better in Spain and Japan where it reached No. 2 and No. 3, respectively. It also entered the Top 20 of the US Modern Rock Chart. The album, Tonight was released 26 January 2009 and debuted at No. 2 in the UK Album Chart and No. 9 in the Billboard 200 chart in the United States. The second single, "No You Girls" saw success both in the charts and on the radio prior to release, eventually reaching No. 7 on the US Modern Rock Chart and was performed by Franz Ferdinand on Comic Relief 2009 Top of The Pops special. "Can't Stop Feeling" was released on 6 July as the third single from the album and on 28 August, "What She Came For" was released as the 4th single in the form of a remix single. The band performed "What She Came For" on The Tonight Show with Conan O'Brien on Wednesday, 26 August 2009.

The band appeared on Radio 1's live lounge performing their second single "No You Girls", and did a cover of Britney Spears' comeback single "Womanizer". In February 2009, Glastonbury Festival announced Franz Ferdinand as the first major band playing at that year's festival. The band also unveiled a 19-date tour of the US during the spring, in support of the new album. The tour included a set at the Coachella Festival. The band were also one of the main stage acts performing at Radio 1's Big Weekend in Swindon in May. On 6 May 2009, it was announced that Franz Ferdinand would be the third opening act for the Green Day's 21st Century Breakdown World Tour. They played 8–26 August 2009, and they followed Kaiser Chiefs and The Bravery.

On 1 June 2009, the band released Blood, a compilation album that includes dub music versions of songs from Tonight: Franz Ferdinand. The release was timed to coincide with Record Store Day. iTunes Festival: London 2009, iTunes Store exclusive, was released in June as well. Also made for the Record Store Day, on 16 April 2011 Domino released the compilation Covers E.P., which featured songs of Tonight: Franz Ferdinand played by Peaches, LCD Soundsystem, Stephin Merritt, ESG and Debbie Harry (who recorded in duet with the band). The first edition was only vinyl, but on 2 May 2011 it was released on CD.

=== Right Thoughts, Right Words, Right Action and FFS with Sparks (2012–2015) ===
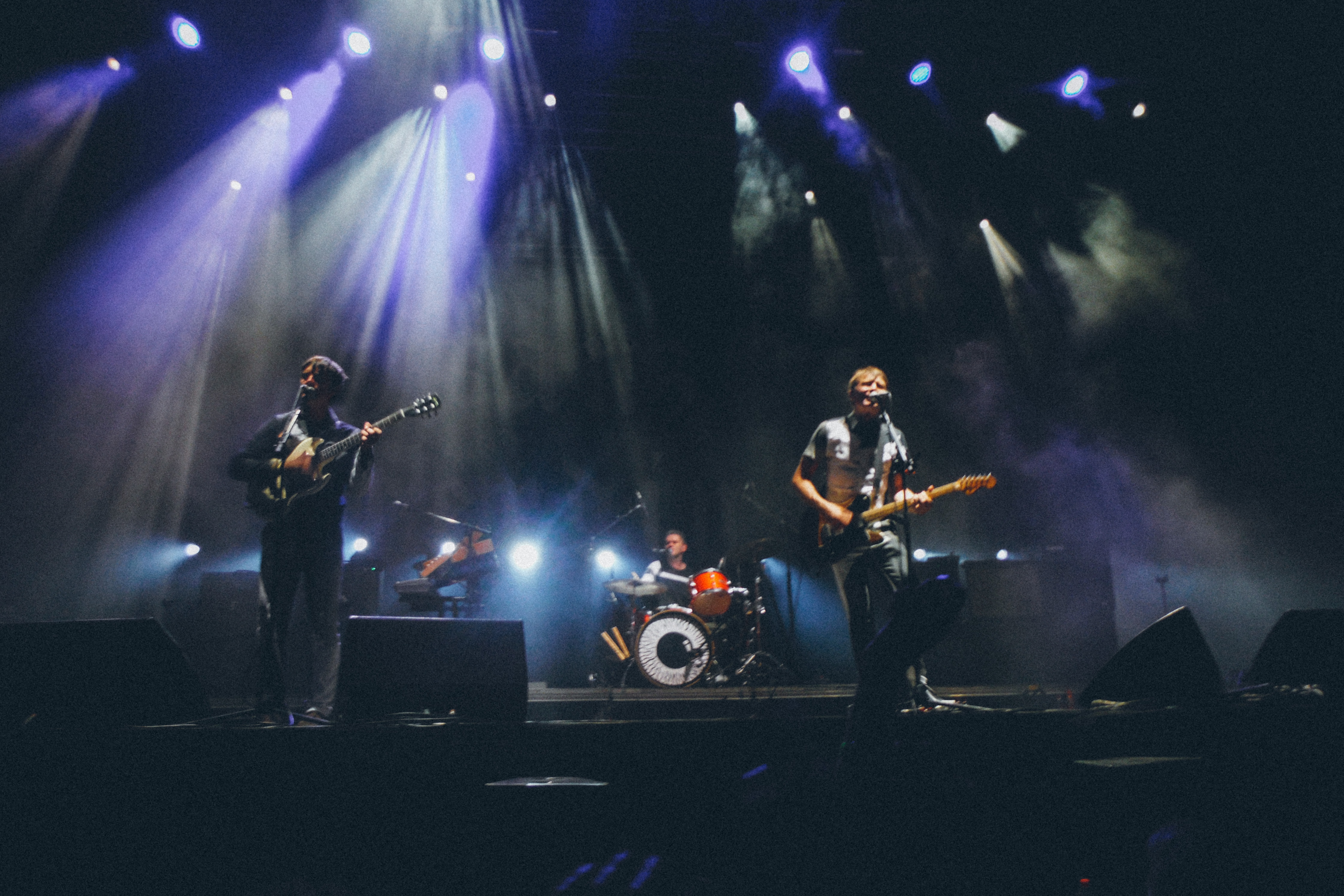
The band performing live at the 2014 Sun Festival in Málaga, Spain

Writing for a fourth studio album began in 2010. Kapranos stated that the band promised themselves they would also focus on not over-publicising their progress as he felt that's something he regretted about their previous album. In May 2012, the band returned to touring, playing several festivals during the summer of 2012 including a headlining slot at Field Day festival in London's Victoria Park. Other appearances included Barcelona's Primavera Sound Festival, Montreal's 2012 Osheaga Music Festival, Chicago's 2012 Lollapalooza Music Festival, Belgium's Dour Festival, Portugal's Marés Vivas Festival and San Francisco's 2012 Outside Lands Music Festival.

During their 2012 tour, the band gradually introduced new songs to their repertoire, along with a reworked version of Tonight cut "Can't Stop Feeling" combined with "I Feel Love" by Donna Summer. In March 2013, Franz Ferdinand continued touring and premiering new songs. In early March they performed "Evil Eye" and "Love Illumination", while the end of the month saw the live premiere of "Goodbye Lovers & Friends". On 16 May 2013, Franz Ferdinand officially announced their fourth album, titled Right Thoughts, Right Words, Right Action, along with cover art, track listing and a release date of 26 August 2013. The band launched the new album at a show at the Electric Brixton. FMV Magazine's Dan Jenko praised the gig, saying that "there's no reason why latest LP Right Thoughts, Right Words, Right Action can't be the belated soundtrack of the summer".

On 9 March 2015, it was announced that the band had formed a supergroup with Sparks under the name FFS, with plans to release a studio album and tour Europe during that summer. A teaser titled "The Domino Effect" was released on the group's YouTube channel that same day. The John Congleton-produced album, FFS, was officially announced on 1 April 2015. Three official singles were released from the album: "Johnny Delusional", which was released on 13 April, "Call Girl", which was released on 28 May, and "Police Encounters", which was released on 23 October.

=== Line-up change and Always Ascending (2016–2020) ===
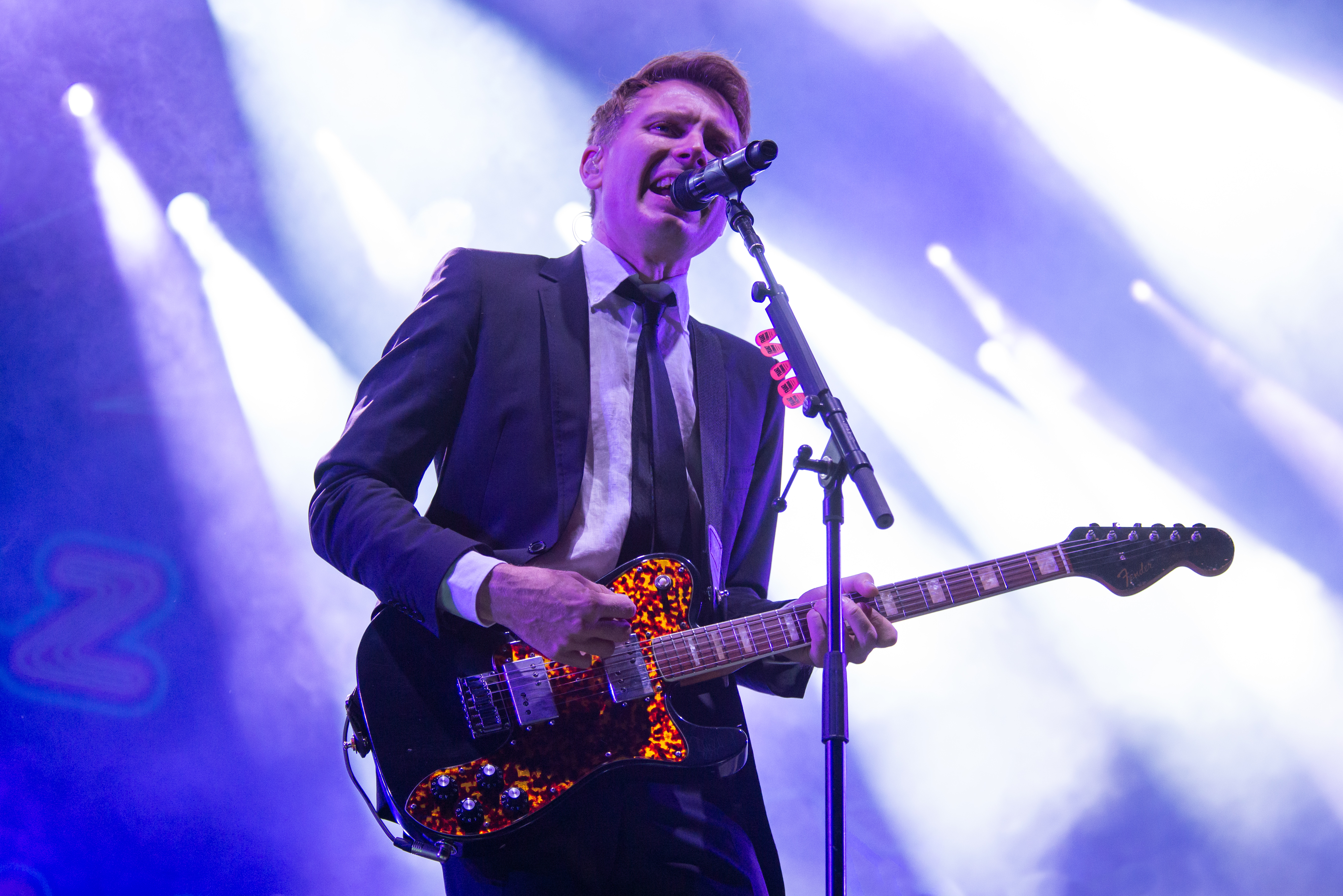
Kapranos performing with the band in France, 2019

In July 2016, the band announced that guitarist Nick McCarthy would not be involved in the recording and touring of their next album, in order to concentrate on his family and other musical interests. The band, however, have stressed that it is possible he may rejoin the band at a later date. On 14 October 2016, the band released "Demagogue", a song protesting and satirising the candidacy of Donald Trump in the U.S. presidential election of 2016. It was released as part of the 30 Days, 50 Songs programme that featured 50 songs lyrically against Trump and his candidacy.

On 19 May 2017, two days prior to the start of their North American tour, Franz Ferdinand announced their new five-piece line-up, with former Yummy Fur and 1990s member Dino Bardot on guitar and Julian Corrie on keyboards, synth and guitar. On 25 October, the band released the single "Always Ascending" from their fifth studio album, Always Ascending (2018). They revealed the album's release date, 9 February 2018, and announced dates for a world tour. Corrie joined the band for the recording sessions of the album, while Bardot joined after recording was completed.

=== Departure of Thomson, Hits to the Head and The Human Fear (2021–present) ===
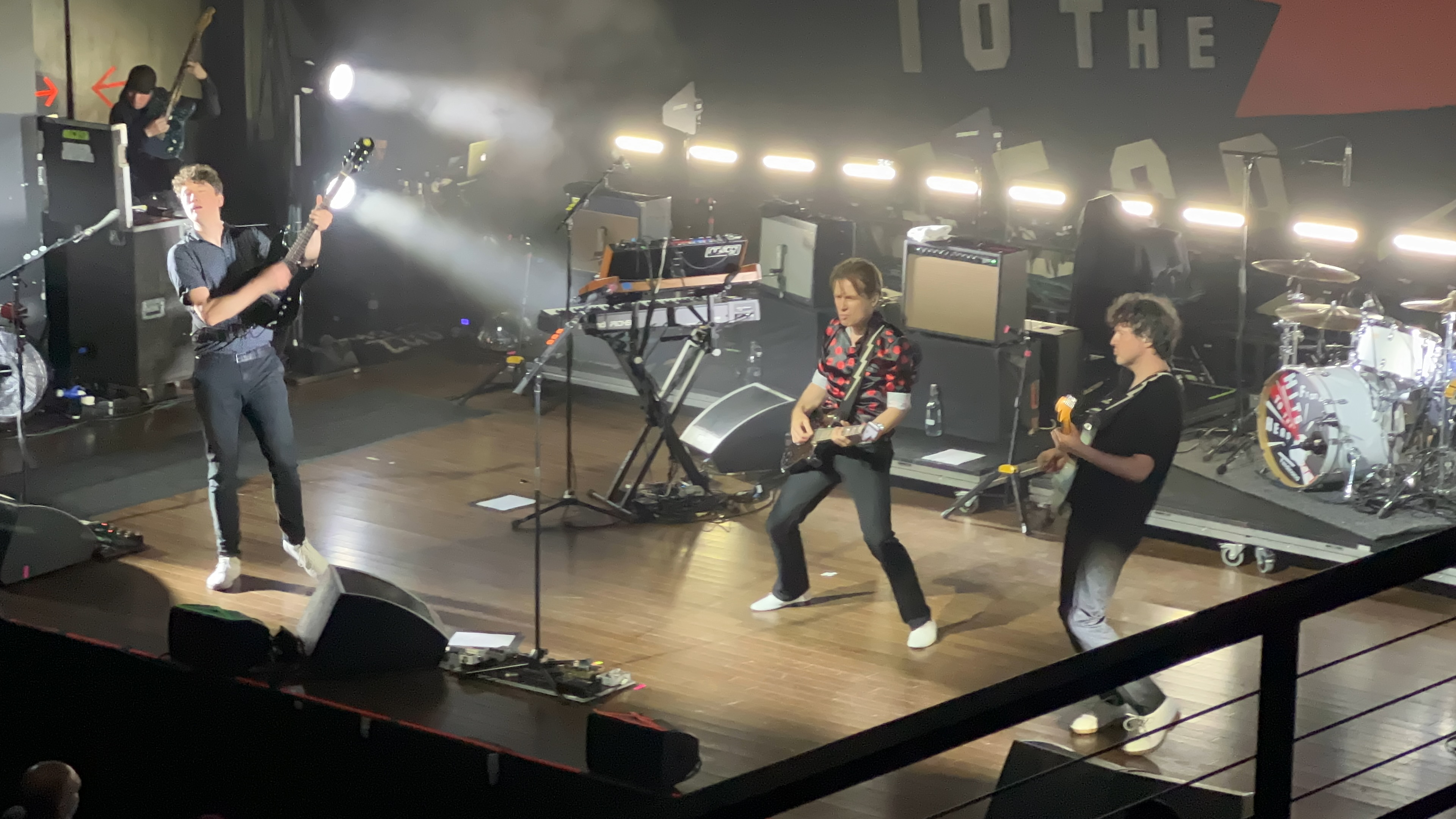
Franz Ferdinand performing during the Hits To The Head Tour, 2022

On 21 October 2021, the band announced through social media that Paul Thomson had departed the band, with Glasgow-based drummer Audrey Tait joining as his replacement, as well as confirming that studio recordings had been undertaken with Tait. The announcement was accompanied by a statement from Thomson and a photograph of him passing his drumsticks to Tait. Tait's debut performance with the band had taken place several weeks before the announcement, at the Balmain fashion show in Paris on 29 September. The band released a new single, "Billy Goodbye", on 2 November 2021. The track is one of two new songs on the greatest hits compilation Hits to the Head, which was released on 11 March 2022.

Franz Ferdinand performed at Night for Ukraine, a fundraising benefit held at the Roundhouse in north London on the evening of March 9, 2022, with the funds raised being donated to the Disasters Emergency Committee appeal, to provide aid to people fleeing Ukraine following the Russian invasion. The event was organised by Fabien Riggall in collaboration with the Ukrainian pop duo Bloom Twins.

On 11 September 2024, Franz Ferdinand announced their sixth studio album, The Human Fear, to be released on 10 January 2025, and along revealed lead single "Audacious". The album is the first full-length album to feature Audrey Tait on drums following the departure of Paul Thomson. The band will tour the UK and Europe in the first half of 2025, beginning on 14 February in Lisbon and concluding in Glasgow on 7 March. On 18 January 2025, Franz Ferdinand performed at Aviva Studios in Manchester for the Amazon Music City Sessions, and had guitarist Johnny Marr for 3 songs, the band's own "Build It Up" and "Do You Want To” and a song from Marr's old group The Smiths, “Bigmouth Strikes Again". The band eventually brought Marr to do a studio version of this new version of "Build It Up", which they released in June alongside a live version of the song "Hooked" featuring a rap verse by Master Peace.

== Collaborations and covers ==
Franz Ferdinand covered the LCD Soundsystem song "All My Friends" which appeared as a B-side on the single and LCD Soundsystem covered their song Live Alone in return, which appeared on a covers EP alongside Stephin Merritt, ESG and Debbie Harry who all covered songs from Tonight. They have also covered "Sexy Boy" by Air, "It Won't Be Long" by the Beatles, Pulp's "Mis-Shapes", Gwen Stefani's top 5 hit "What You Waiting For?", Blondie's "Call Me", Britney Spears' "Womanizer" and David Bowie's song "Sound and Vision", featuring Girls Aloud on backing vocals, for a compilation disc marking the 40th anniversary of BBC Radio 1, along with other leading artists. Additionally, Franz Ferdinand recorded a cover of the Fire Engines' song "Get Up and Use Me". In return, the Fire Engines recorded a cover of "Jacqueline". The band also took a similar approach with Dutch band De Kift, covering the song "Heisa-Ho" whilst De Kift recorded a cover of "Love and Destroy" with Dutch lyrics. The cover by De Kift is named "Liefde En Puin" which is the title "Love and Destroy" translated into Dutch. The band has had remixes by electronic artists Daft Punk, Hot Chip, Justice, The Avalanches, Microfilm and Erol Alkan.

The band also performed, played and recorded with Jane Birkin, covering the Serge Gainsbourg song "Sorry Angel" for the 2005 album Monsieur Gainsbourg Revisited. In addition, Franz re-recorded the track "Brown Onions" for David Shrigley's compilation album Worried Noodles. The band kept instrumentation identical but used lyrics written by Shrigley which include the consistent repetition of the word "No" and occasionally "No brains, no teeth, no legs, no eyes...". Hot Chip, a band who are reported to be a favourite of Franz Ferdinand, also performed their own version of "No" on the same album. The band partnered with Sony in Tokyo, filming commercials for the launch of the A Series Walkman music player on 8 September 2005. A limited edition Franz Ferdinand-themed Walkman A Series player was released by Sony Japan in January 2006, with only one hundred made.

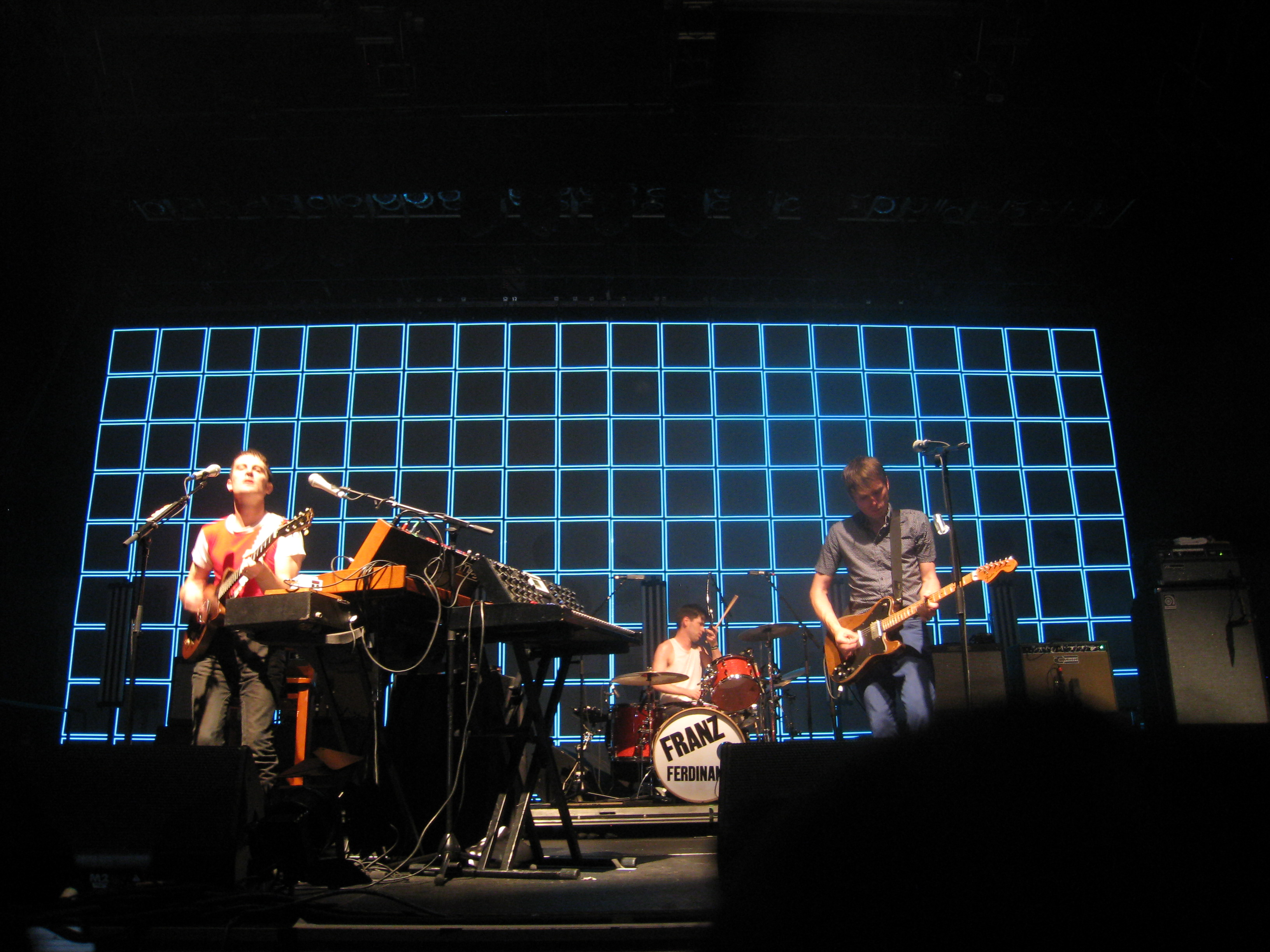
The band performing at the Roseland Ballroom in 2008

The band 'met' Gorillaz in December 2005 and interviewed each other for a feature in Observer Music Monthly. At the 2009 NME Awards ceremony, they performed a cover of Blondie's "Call Me" with Elly Jackson of La Roux on guest vocals. When the band appeared on Radio 1's Live Lounge on 6 April 2009, to promote "No You Girls", they covered "Womanizer" by Britney Spears. They have also collaborated with Marion Cotillard for the 2010 Lady Dior campaign. The band wrote the lyrics and plays the music for the song "The Eyes of Mars", while the actress is on vocals. Kapranos noted that it was refreshing working with her as she had a lot of fun going and retrying the song time and time again. In 2010, Franz Ferdinand contributed to the Alice in Wonderland soundtrack with their adaption of the song "The Lobster Quadrille". Later that year, Kapranos and McCarthy collaborated on the song "Do It Again" with Edwyn Collins on his album Losing Sleep.

In 2016, Alex Kapranos took part in a documentary about Glasgow music and Chemikal Underground Records called Lost in France. The film was directed by Niall McCann and brought Kapranos (along with members of The Delgados, Mogwai and others) to Mauron, Brittany, to recreate a gig they played when Kapranos was in his earlier band, The Karelia. The film features Kapranos playing live with Stuart Braithwaite of Mogwai, and other musicians such as Emma Pollock and RM Hubbert, and Holy Mountain, as well as interviews with Kapranos and his old label-mates. Lost in France premiered at the Edinburgh International Film Festival to wholly positive reviews and was called "funny, vital and sobering" by Scotland's arts bible The Skinny. In 2022, Franz Ferdinand's single, "This Fire" served as the opening theme song for the Polish-Japanese animated series, Cyberpunk: Edgerunners.

== Style ==
=== Music and art ===
The band's logo since their inception circa 2002

Stylistically, the band has been labelled as indie rock, post-punk revival, garage rock revival, dance-rock, dance-punk, art rock, art punk and post-Britpop. The band is notable for its use of Russian avant-garde imagery in album and single covers designed by Matthew Cooper. Examples include: "You Could Have It So Much Better", which references a 1924 portrait of Lilya Brik by Alexander Rodchenko; "Take Me Out", which references One-Sixth Part of the World, also by Alexander Rodchenko; "This Fire" which references Beat the Whites with the Red Wedge by El Lissitzky; and "Michael", with single art based on A Proun by Lissitzky. The song "Love and Destroy" was inspired by the scene of disorder made by Margarita, a character of Michael Bulgakov's "The Master and Margarita", in the apartment of the literature critic Latunzky.

Also, in "Outsiders", the lyrics "In seventeen years will you still be Camille, Lee Miller, Gala or whatever" are a reference to the lovers of the artists Auguste Rodin, Man Ray and Salvador Dalí.

The band have been credited with helping to increase the popularity of men's fringed hairstyles.

=== Music videos ===
Many of the videos to promote the band's singles take inspiration from Russian avant-garde much like their LP and CD sleeves.

The avant-garde music video for "Take Me Out", directed by Jonas Odell, was inspired by Dadaism (especially Max Ernst's Une Semaine de Bonté), Busby Berkeley choreographies and Russian constructivist design. Alex Kapranos explained the many and varied influences behind the 1930s-style promo for second single "Take Me Out": "It's kind of two dimensional in a three dimensional style if that makes any sense. It's a montage of images; ourselves, pictures and things taken from other places and put together in a strange, abstract way. That's what gives the video that strange, jerky, style".

The lyrics of "Do You Want To" make reference to parties at the "trendy" Glasgow art gallery Transmission, and the video includes a variety of the work of contemporary artist Vanessa Beecroft.

== Members ==
Current members

- Alex Kapranos – lead vocals, guitar (2002–present), keyboards (2005–present)
- Bob Hardy – bass, occasional backing vocals (2002–present)
- Julian Corrie – keyboards, guitar, backing vocals (2017–present)
- Dino Bardot – guitar, backing vocals (2017–present)
- Audrey Tait – drums, percussion (2021–present)

Former members

- Paul Thomson – drums, percussion, backing and occasional lead vocals (2002–2021)
- Nick McCarthy – guitar, keyboards, backing and occasional lead vocals (2002–2016)

Former touring member

- Andy Knowles – keyboards, backing vocals (2005-06)

Timeline

== Discography ==
Studio albums

- Franz Ferdinand (2004)
- You Could Have It So Much Better (2005)
- Tonight: Franz Ferdinand (2009)
- Right Thoughts, Right Words, Right Action (2013)
- Always Ascending (2018)
- The Human Fear (2025)

== See also ==
- List of bands from Glasgow
- List of Scottish musicians
