= Paul Thomson =

Scottish drummer (born 1976)

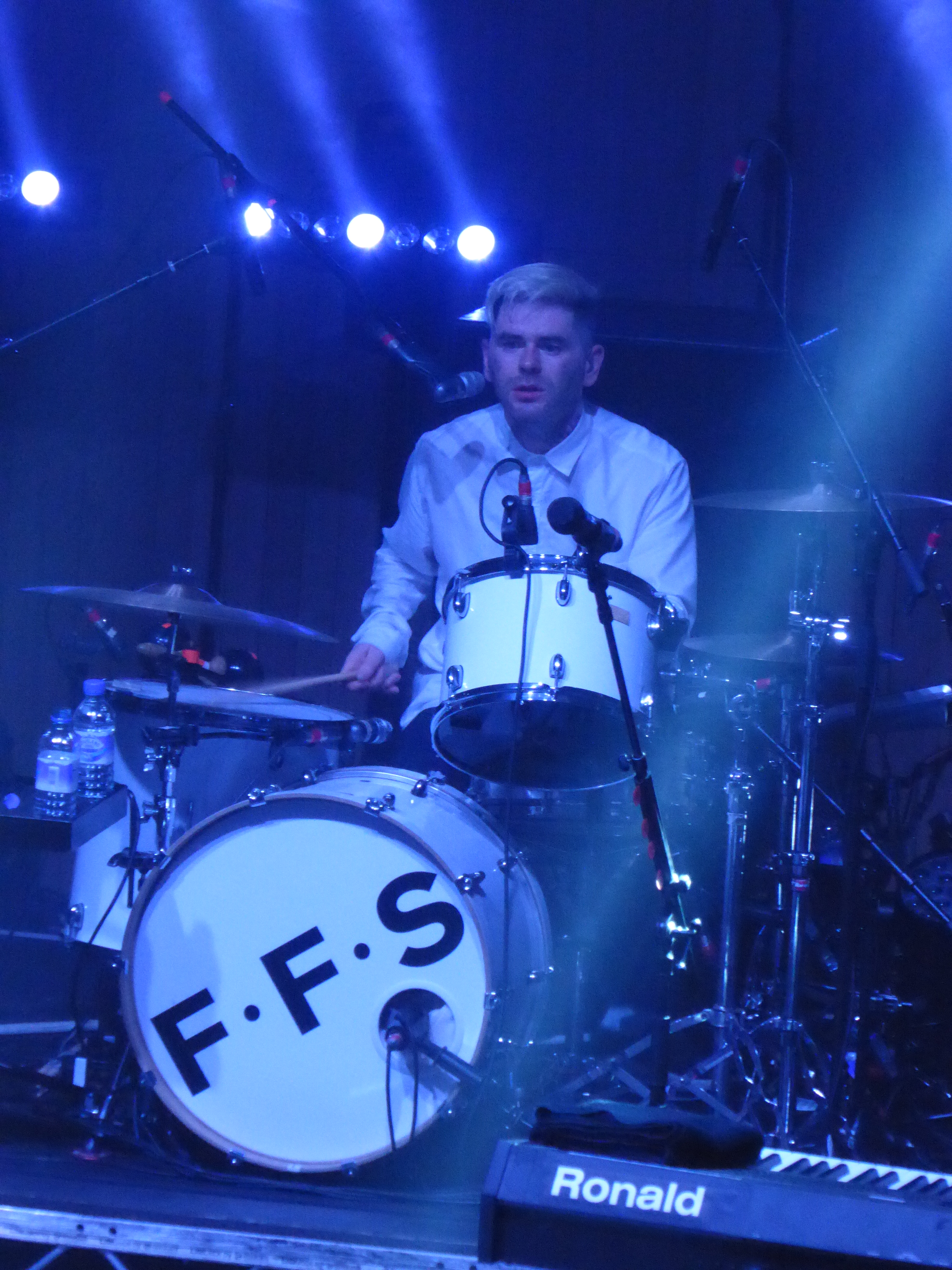
- Thomson performing in 2015

Background information
- Born: 15 September 1976 (age 49); Glasgow, Scotland
- Genres: Indie rock; post-punk revival; dance-punk; dance-rock; art rock
- Occupation: Musician
- Instruments: Drums; percussion
- Years active: 1997–present
- Member of: Lung Leg
- Formerly of: Franz Ferdinand; FFS; Correcto; The Yummy Fur; Amor

Paul Robert Thomson (born 15 September 1976) is a Scottish musician who was the drummer for the Glasgow-based band Franz Ferdinand from their formation in 2002 until October 2021. Currently, he serves as the drummer for garage pop-punk band Lung Leg.

== Biography ==
Thomson has always been interested in music, able to play various instruments such as guitar, keyboard and bass guitar in addition to the drums.

During the late 1990s, he was drummer of The Yummy Fur and was at one point part of The Purple Bajengas and Pro Forma. It was in The Yummy Fur that Thomson would meet Alex Kapranos. When The Yummy Fur broke up, Thomson had various odd jobs DJing and working as a nude model at the Glasgow School of Art. He is also the drummer in the Glasgow band Amor, with Luke Fowler, Richard Youngs and Michael Francis Duch.

In 2001, Thomson joined Franz Ferdinand, originally playing guitar. He later switched to drums. He also does backing vocals, and sang lead on the German version of "Tell Her Tonight" from B-side of the "Michael" single. The English version is from Franz Ferdinand.

His record label, NEW! (which started in 2005), only releases material on vinyl records.

Thomson resided in Glasgow with his now ex-wife Esther (DJ and lead singer of Cash Machine). Together they DJ'd as Polyester (Paul and Esther). They had a baby boy named Georgie in July 2006, and on 19 September 2008 (while Franz Ferdinand were supposed to be headlining a concert) they had another boy and named him Ronnie. Because of Thomson's absence, Franz Ferdinand played a semi-acoustic set and swapped the headlining spot with The Ting Tings. Thomson also has a show on Subcity Radio called "they're only records paul" which runs fortnightly on Thursdays.

In June 2008, it was announced that Thomson was now endorsing Highwood Drums, a UK custom company becoming a Highwood artist.

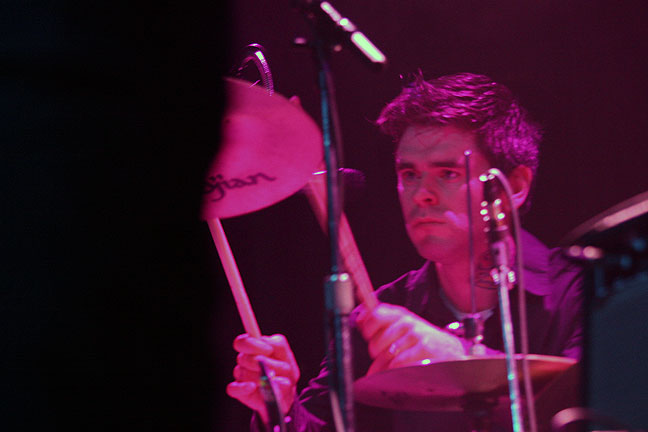
Thomson in 2009

Thomson is the son of Bert and Ellen Thomson. He has one sister, Hazel. In 2009, he was voted Scotland's Greatest Ever Drummer by the readers of Dear Scotland.

In October 2021, the band announced on Twitter that Thomson would be leaving Franz Ferdinand after 20 years. The announcement was accompanied by a statement by Thomson and a photograph of him passing his drumsticks to his replacement, Audrey Tait.
