= Nick McCarthy =

English-German musician (born 1974)

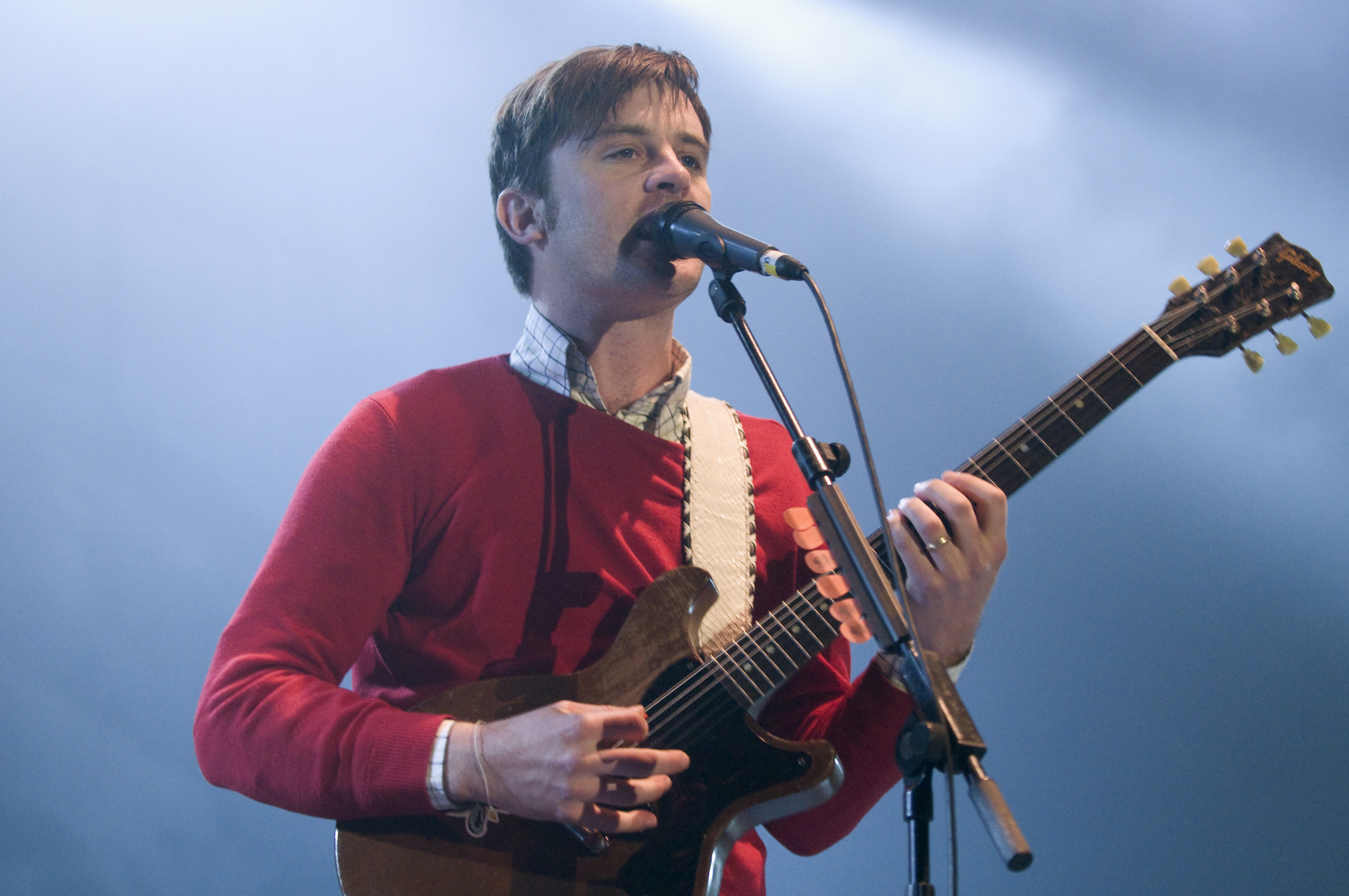
- McCarthy performing in 2008 with Franz Ferdinand

Background information
- Born: Nicholas John McCarthy; 13 December 1974 (age 51); Blackpool, England
- Origin: Vagen, Germany
- Genres: Indie rock; post-punk revival
- Occupations: Musician; songwriter
- Instruments: Guitar; piano; keyboard; synthesizer; bass; vocals; drums
- Years active: 2001–present
- Member of: Box Codax; Das Lunsentrio; The Nix; Nitsch
- Formerly of: Franz Ferdinand; FFS; Embryo

Nicholas John McCarthy (born 13 December 1974) is an English-German musician. His main focus is on songwriting and song production. He is also a guitarist, singer and keyboard player. McCarthy was a founding member of the Glasgow-based band Franz Ferdinand, and remained until his departure in 2016.

== Life ==
McCarthy was born in Blackpool, England. He grew up in Vagen near Munich, Bavaria, Germany. The artist Anna McCarthy is his younger sister. As a teenager he stole a car with friends and since then has been nicknamed "McCarThief". He graduated from High School in Bad Aibling and was trained classically as a pianist and double bassist at the Munich Conservatory.

On 2 July 2005, McCarthy married his Austrian fiancée Manuela Gernedel in Bavaria, Germany. Franz Ferdinand turned down a Live 8 spot so that the pair could marry. They have two children.

== Musical career ==
Before his breakthrough with Franz Ferdinand, Nick McCarthy was a member of the bands Kamerakino and the jazz band Scatter. He also played double bass, cello and Arabic lute in the band Embryo, whose music is described as a "fusion of jazz, rock and ethnic world music".

He is active in numerous bands and music projects and works as songwriter and producer at "Flokati Studios" in Munich as well as at "Sausage Studios" in Hackney Lane in London.

The Flokati Studios, founded in 2020, are where Nick McCarthy works with the musician Mario Schönhofer among others. He co-founded Sausage Studios with Sebastian Kellig in 2012.

=== Franz Ferdinand ===
In 2001 McCarthy moved to Glasgow. There he met vocalist and lead guitarist Alex Kapranos at a party. The two met up with Paul Thomson who had played drums with The Yummy Fur. With the addition of Bob Hardy, the band became Franz Ferdinand. Although McCarthy was classically trained on the piano and double bass, he initially tried his hand on drumming but then became the band's guitarist, keyboardist, backing vocalist and (co-)songwriter.

McCarthy left the band in 2016 to focus on family matters and other musical projects.

=== Nitsch ===
Together with actor Niklas Mitteregger and producer and mixer Emin Corrado McCarthy forms the band Nitsch.

It´s his latest band project. They have been signed to the German label Staatsakt since 2022.

Their debut single "Mutant Funk" was released in July 2022. Musically, the song is described by the label as "high-energy indie rock with Suicide's electro twist." The single "Is ok" followed in November 2022. They released their single "Ende der Welt" in Spring 2023. Their debut album Bar von Josefine was released in September 2024. They released their latest single "Beschissene Party" in December 2024.

=== Ströme x Nick McCarthy ===
In 2022, Nick McCarthy collaborated with the band Ströme. Together they released the singles "Right Now", "Stadlberg" and "Das Modul" on Compost Records. In these songs they used the legendary modular synthesizer Moog IIIp, the same machine the Beatles used to record some of their greatest songs in the 1960s.

=== Das Lunsentrio ===
Together with Seb-I Kellig (among others dub producer for LaBrassBanda) and the berlin artist Hank Schmidt in der Beek, Nick McCarthy forms the band "Das Lunsentrio". Their first album "Der Lunsen-Ring" was self-published in 2011. In 2017 they released their second album "Aufstehn!" on the label Problembär Records. The album was recorded and produced at East London's Sausage Studios. It encompasses a musical palette "from sweaty post-NDW to lyrically surreal agitprop three-part and protest funk in the musical tradition of the band Ton Steine Scherben to alpenglowy rockers reggae."

Most recently, the album "69 Arten Den Pubrock Zu Spielen" was released in 2021 on Tapete Records.

=== The Nix ===
The Nix is a project by Seb Kellig and Nick McCarthy. Together with a variety of guest vocalists (including Laetitia Sadier from Stereolab, KT Tunstall and Vula Malinga from Basement Jaxx) they recorded their debut album "Sausage Studio Sessions" in 2020. It was released on the label Moshi Moshi Records and produced at their East London Sausage Studios. McCarthy says about "Sausage Studio Sessions" this is an album he always had in mind to record after leaving Franz Ferdinand. Something that felt at the same time like farewell and a new start party incorporating all the amazing musicians and people he met around the world. The songs, he said, were written collectively and very spontaneously with the artists who came by Sausage Studios, and the whole record was recorded with a backing band, Motown Style on party nights.

=== Manuela ===
Under the name "Manuela", McCarthy and his wife Manuela Gernedel released the eponymous indie pop album "Manuela" on Lost Map Records in 2017. It was created at the Sausage Studios in London. Gernedel is described as the creative main force behind "Manuela" in an interview by the cultural magazine The Skinny. While she wrote the lyrics for the songs, McCarthy composed the music for them.

=== Box Codax ===
In 2003, McCarthy and his long-time friend Alexander Ragnew formed the band Box Codax. They released their first two singles, "Boys and Girls" and "Naked Smile" on the label The Thin Man (previously known as Thin Man Records). The band's first album, "Only An Orchard Away" was released on 4 September 2006. McCarthy's wife makes several appearances on the album. The band released the album on the label Gomma Records. In a review the music is described as "a collection of weird, whimsical and nostalgic songs - sometimes rough, sometimes punky."

In May 2011, Box Codax released their second studio album called Hellabuster, which Nick McCarthy wrote and produced. The album is an eccentric take on the peculiar and young life of Hellabuster, with each song being accompanied by its own video. The music on Hellabuster moves between distorted disco, post-punk and glam-prog and includes contributions and appearances by Mike Fraser, Joseph Mount, Metronomy, Paul Thomson and many more. The videos for the songs, which were directed by British artists (including Turner Prize winner Martin Creed), contributed to the critical acclaim of the eccentric album. All video episodes of Hellabuster are freely available.

=== Collaborations ===
- For the opera "The Sandman" by Anna Calvi and Robert Wilson which is based on the story by E.T.A. Hoffmann, McCarthy played Live-Music together with Philipp Plessmann, Theresa Stark and Lisa Wilhelm at the Thalia Theater in Hamburg in early 2023.
- McCarthy co-composed songs with Polina Lapkovskaya and Federico Sanchez for the play "Ronia, the Robber's Daughter", which premiered at the Residence Theatre in Munich in 2019.
- In 2018, McCarthy produced the album "WAX" by the Scottish singer-songwriter KT Tunstall. McCarthy co-wrote several songs on the album. He also appears as vocalist as well as musician on bass, keyboard and synthesizer.
- Together with Seb Kellig, Nick McCarthy composed the music for the police series "Heiter bis tödlich - München 7" for over 20 episodes, including the fifth season of the series, which was broadcast in 2014.

== Discography (selection) ==
=== Albums ===
- 2001: Djaosch Macholi Orchester
- 2003: Kamerakino: Paradiso
- 2004: Franz Ferdinand: Franz Ferdinand
- 2005: Franz Ferdinand: You Could Have It So Much Better
- 2006: Box Codax: Only An Orchard Away
- 2009: Franz Ferdinand: Tonight: Franz Ferdinand
- 2011: Box Codax: Hellabuster
- 2011: Das Lunsentrio: Der Lunsen-Ring
- 2013: Franz Ferdinand: Right Thoughts, Right Words, Right Actions
- 2015: FFS (Franz Ferdinand and Sparks): FFS
- 2016: Embryo: It Do
- 2017: Das Lunsentrio: Aufstehn
- 2017: Manuela: Manuela
- 2020: The Nix: Sausage Studio Sessions
- 2021: Das Lunsentrio: 69 Arten, den Pubrock zu spielen
- 2024: Nitsch: Bar von Josefine

=== Singles, productions and collaborations ===
- 2009: Single Inaugural Trams (on the album Super Furry Animals - Dark Days/Light Years)
- 2010: Killa Kela: Single Everyday (Nick McCarthy & Sugar Tons of Ferdinand Nightmare Remix)
- 2016: Serienmusik für "Tinkershrimp & Dutch"
- 2018: KT Tunstall: Album WAX
- 2019: KT Tunstall: Single Extra Wax
- 2019: Compositions for the play "Ronia, the Robber's Daughter" at Residence Theatre in Munich
- 2022: Ströme x Nick McCarthy: Single Right Now
- 2022: Ströme x Nick McCarthy: Single Stadlberg
- 2022: Ströme x Nick McCarthy: Single Das Modul
- 2022: Single The Pike (on the Single The Fernweh - Pas Devant Les Enfants)
- 2022: Nitsch: Single Mutant Funk
- 2022: Nitsch: Single Is ok
- 2023: Nitsch: Single Ende der Welt
- 2023: Nitsch: Single Ich kann nicht mehr
- 2024: Nitsch: Single Bar von Josefine
- 2024: Nitsch: Single Pupillen
- 2024: Nitsch: Single Beschissene Party
