= Bob Hardy (bassist) =

English musician

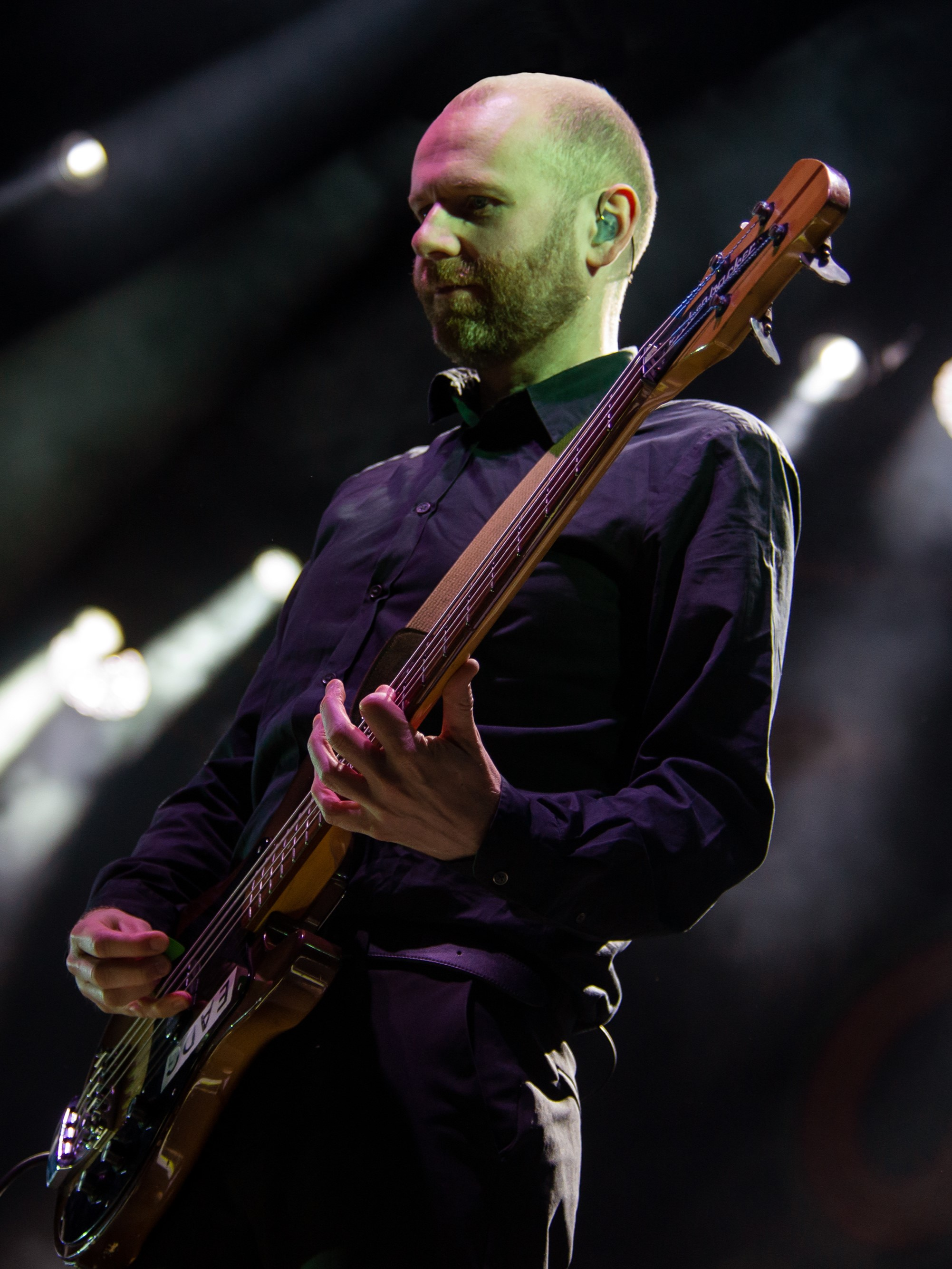
- Hardy performing with Franz Ferdinand in 2019

Background information
- Born: Robert Byron Hardy; 16 August 1980 (age 45); Dewsbury, West Yorkshire, England
- Origin: Bradford, West Yorkshire, England
- Genres: Indie rock; post-punk revival; art rock
- Occupation: Bassist
- Years active: 2002–present
- Labels: Domino
- Member of: Franz Ferdinand
- Formerly of: FFS

Robert Byron Hardy (born 16 August 1980) is an English musician and the bassist in the band Franz Ferdinand.

== Biography ==
Hardy grew up in the outskirts of Bradford and attended Bradford Grammar School. Hardy is an artist with an interest in music while friend and bandmate Alex Kapranos is a musician interested in art; this is one of the primary reasons for how their friendship was established. Through Hardy's friends from the Glasgow School of Art, Kapranos developed an interest in the work of the Dadaists and the Russian Constructivists. Many of the earlier shows of the band would come about thanks to the band's art world contacts.

Hardy is a vegan.

== Equipment ==
Hardy plays a 1974 and a 1978 Rickenbacker 4001s / Hagström / Fender Precision. He previously used an SWR Goliath bass cabinet but now uses an Ampeg SVT Pro head and Ampeg 8×10 cabs. He uses Ernie Ball strings – roundwounds, medium gauge. His plectrum is a custom 0.60 mm magnesium/teflon amalgam.
