= Hits to the Head =

Greatest hits album by Franz Ferdinand
- Released: 11 March 2022
- Recorded: June 2003 – 2021
- Studios: Gula (Malmö); Govan Town Hall (Govan); Mr. Dan's Studio (London); Black Pudding (Glasgow); Sausage (London); Club Ralph (London); Motorbass (Paris); RAK (London)
- Genres: Indie rock; post-punk revival; dance-punk
- Length: 69:20
- Label: Domino
- Producers: Franz Ferdinand; Rich Costey; Alex Kapranos; Tore Johansson; Dan Carey; Julian Corrie; Stuart Price; Todd Terje; Philippe Zdar; Joe Goddard; Alexis Taylor

Franz Ferdinand chronology
Always Ascending (2018)	Hits to the Head (2022)	The Human Fear (2025)

Professional ratings
Aggregate scores
Source	Rating
Metacritic	77/100
Review scores
Source	Rating
AllMusic	4/5 stars
Clash	9/10
PopMatters	6/10
Under the Radar	7/10

Hits to the Head is a greatest hits album by Scottish indie rock band Franz Ferdinand, released on 11 March 2022 through the Domino Recording Company.

== Overview ==
The album was announced on 2 November 2021, coinciding with the release of the single "Billy Goodbye".

Of the decision to release a greatest hits album, lead singer Alex Kapranos compared the selection process of tracks for it to "writing a set-list for a festival", while further adding: "I have friends who believe you're somehow not a "real" fan if you own a best of rather than a discography. I disagree. I think of my parents' record collection as a kid. I loved their compilation LPs. I am so grateful that they had Changes or Rolled Gold. Those LPs were my entrance point. My introduction."

== Content ==
The album includes the band's singles with the exception of the album track "Outsiders". The versions available on the compilation are for the most part single versions and edits, except two exclusive edits, "Walk Away" and "The Fallen", and "Glimpse of Love" which is presented with the album version.

On vinyl issues of the album, each side presents an "Era" of the band. The first side (Tracks 1–5) covers their debut album, second side (6–10) covers their sophomore album, etc.

== Track listing ==
Hits to the Head track listing
No.	Title	Writer(s)	Producer(s)	Length
1.	"Darts of Pleasure" (Franz Ferdinand, 2004)	Alex Kapranos; Nick McCarthy	Tore Johansson	3:00
2.	"Take Me Out" (Franz Ferdinand, 2004)	Kapranos; McCarthy	Johansson	3:59
3.	"The Dark of the Matinée" (Franz Ferdinand, 2004)	Kapranos; McCarthy; Bob Hardy	Johansson	4:05
4.	"Michael" (Franz Ferdinand, 2004)	Kapranos; McCarthy	Johansson	3:23
5.	"This Fire" (single version; original album version from Franz Ferdinand, 2004)	Kapranos; McCarthy	Rich Costey	3:34
6.	"Do You Want To" (You Could Have It So Much Better, 2005)	Kapranos; McCarthy; Hardy; Paul Thomson	Costey; Franz Ferdinand	3:36
7.	"Walk Away" (HTTH edit; You Could Have It So Much Better, 2005)	Kapranos; McCarthy; Hardy; Thomson	Costey; Franz Ferdinand	3:28
8.	"The Fallen" (HTTH edit; You Could Have It So Much Better, 2005)	Kapranos; McCarthy	Costey; Franz Ferdinand	2:57
9.	"Outsiders" (You Could Have It So Much Better, 2005)	Kapranos; McCarthy; Hardy; Thomson	Costey; Franz Ferdinand	3:37
10.	"Lucid Dreams" (non-album single; 2008)	Kapranos; McCarthy; Hardy; Thomson	Dan Carey; Franz Ferdinand	3:44
11.	"Ulysses" (Tonight: Franz Ferdinand, 2009)	Kapranos; McCarthy; Hardy; Thomson	Carey; Franz Ferdinand	3:10
12.	"No You Girls (Radio Mix)" (Tonight: Franz Ferdinand, 2009)	Kapranos; McCarthy; Hardy; Thomson	Carey; Franz Ferdinand	3:22
13.	"Right Action" (Right Thoughts, Right Words, Right Action, 2013)	Kapranos; McCarthy	Joe Goddard; Alexis Taylor	2:56
14.	"Evil Eye" (Right Thoughts, Right Words, Right Action, 2013)	Kapranos; McCarthy	Kapranos; Todd Terje	2:46
15.	"Love Illumination" (Right Thoughts, Right Words, Right Action, 2013)	Kapranos; McCarthy	Kapranos	3:45
16.	"Stand on the Horizon" (Right Thoughts, Right Words, Right Action, 2013)	Kapranos; McCarthy	Kapranos; Terje	4:25
17.	"Always Ascending" (Always Ascending, 2018)	Julian Corrie; Hardy; Kapranos; Thomson	Philippe Zdar	3:50
18.	"Glimpse of Love" (Always Ascending, 2018)	Corrie; Hardy; Kapranos; Thomson	Zdar	3:13
19.	"Curious" (newly recorded)	Kapranos	Julian Corrie; Kapranos; Stuart Price	2:49
20.	"Billy Goodbye" (newly recorded)	Kapranos	Corrie; Kapranos; Price	3:41
Total length:				69:20

Japanese edition (bonus track)
No.	Title	Writer(s)	Producer(s)	Length
21.	"Eleanor Put Your Boots On" (You Could Have It So Much Better, 2005) (Single Version)	Kapranos; McCarthy	Costey	3:14
Total length:				72:45

== Charts ==
Chart performance for Hits to the Head
Chart (2022)	Peak position
Australian Albums (ARIA)	78
Austrian Albums (Ö3 Austria)	15
Belgian Albums (Ultratop Flanders)	22
Belgian Albums (Ultratop Wallonia)	5
Croatian International Albums (HDU)	1
Dutch Albums (Album Top 100)	31
French Albums (SNEP)	55
German Albums (Offizielle Top 100)	9
Japanese Albums (Oricon)	45
Portuguese Albums (AFP)	10
Scottish Albums (Official Charts)	4
Spanish Albums (Promusicae)	16
Swiss Albums (Schweizer Hitparade)	15
UK Albums (Official Charts)	7
US Top Album Sales (Billboard)	42
