= The Human Fear =

Studio album by Franz Ferdinand
- Released: 10 January 2025
- Studio: AYR (Scotland)
- Genres: Indie rock; dance-rock; alternative rock
- Length: 35:15
- Label: Domino
- Producer: Mark Ralph

Franz Ferdinand chronology
Hits to the Head (2022)	The Human Fear (2025)

Singles from The Human Fear
- 1. "Audacious" Released: 11 September 2024; 2. "Night or Day" Released: 18 November 2024; 3. "Hooked" Released: 6 January 2025; 4. "Build It Up" / "Hooked" Released: 24 June 2025

The Human Fear is the sixth studio album by Scottish indie rock band Franz Ferdinand, released on 10 January 2025 through Domino. Produced by Mark Ralph, it is the band's first full studio album to feature guitarist Dino Bardot, who joined the band after the recording of 2018's Always Ascending, and drummer Audrey Tait, who replaced original member Paul Thomson in 2021.

Preceded by the singles, "Audacious", "Night or Day" and "Hooked", the album reached number three on the UK Albums Chart and number one on the Scottish Albums Chart.

== Production and composition ==
The Human Fear was recorded at AYR Studios in Scotland and produced by Mark Ralph, who previously served as a mixer and recording engineer on the band's fourth studio album, Right Thoughts, Right Words, Right Action (2013). The album's title refers to the album's primary lyrical concept of fear and "searching for the thrill of being human via fears", as described by band frontman Alex Kapranos. Kapranos further states that the album touches upon certain types of specific fear, including "fear of social isolation, fear of leaving an institution, [and] fear of leaving or staying in a relationship".

== Promotion and release ==
The band announced on 9 September 2024 that they would be releasing a new song, titled "Audacious", on 11 September. The following day, fans discovered a store listing for The Human Fear, a new studio album from the band. Alongside the release of "Audacious", the band confirmed that The Human Fear would be their sixth studio album, to be released on 10 January 2025 through Domino.

The editions of the album included additional LP of album demos.

== Critical reception ==
Professional ratings
Aggregate scores
Source	Rating
AnyDecentMusic?	6.8/10
Metacritic	71/100
Review scores
Source	Rating
AllMusic	3.5/5 stars
Clash	7/10
DIY	4.5/5 stars
The Guardian	2/5 stars
Mojo	4/5 stars
NME	4/5 stars
The Observer	3/5 stars
Paste	7.2/10
Pitchfork	6.3/10
Rolling Stone	4/5 stars

According to review aggregator Metacritic, The Human Fear received "generally favourable reviews" based on a weighted average score of 71 out of 100 from 18 critic scores.

Robin Murray of Clash gave the album seven out of ten, noting "A band blessed with an innate pop touch, there’s a fantastic degree of immediacy on show here. Lead single 'Audacious' is a preening slice of Franz-pop with an arch Alex Kapranos vocal, while the tumbling piano line on 'Night Or Day' points to the influence of one-time collaborators Sparks in its daring wit," and concluded "Fun, lean, and concise, 'The Human Fear' finds Franz Ferdinand looking to the future without any need to panic."

== Track listing ==
All tracks are written by Alex Kapranos, except where noted.

The Human Fear track listing
No.	Title	Writer(s)	Length
1.	"Audacious"		3:23
2.	"Everydaydreamer"	Kapranos; Julian Corrie	3:12
3.	"The Doctor"	Kapranos; Corrie; Dino Bardot	2:20
4.	"Hooked"	Kapranos; Corrie	2:41
5.	"Build It Up"	Kapranos; Corrie	3:03
6.	"Night or Day"		3:21
7.	"Tell Me I Should Stay"		4:45
8.	"Cats"		3:17
9.	"Black Eyelashes"		2:52
10.	"Bar Lonely"	Kapranos; Bob Hardy	3:05
11.	"The Birds"		3:16
Total length:			35:15

Japanese-exclusive CD bonus track listing
No.	Title	Length
12.	"It's Funny"	3:35
Total length:		38:50

Bonus 12" demo LP track listing
No.	Title	Length
1.	"Audacious" (1st phone recording)	4:41
2.	"Dr Dr"	1:45
3.	"Back on the Outside"	3:56
4.	"Every Day"	3:42
5.	"Love Song 140bpm"	5:01
6.	"Every Day Dreamer 4"	3:31
7.	"Curious"	4:00
8.	"Audacious Riffs 1 & 2"	1:50
9.	"Build It Up avec Antoine et Pierre"	2:57
10.	"Bar Lonely"	3:11
11.	"Every Day" (acoustic demo)	3:08
12.	"Black Eyelashes"	2:56
13.	"Audacious" (String arr. 1st Sketch)	1:04
14.	"The Birds"	3:36
15.	"Dumb Korg"	3:26
16.	"Billy Goodbye"	4:11
Total length:		51:55

- Note: On vinyl pressings, the placement of "Bar Lonely" and "Tell Me I Should Stay" is reversed.

== Personnel ==
=== Franz Ferdinand ===
- Alex Kapranos – lead vocals, guitar, keyboards, additional production
- Julian Corrie – keyboards, synthesiser, backing vocals, additional production
- Audrey Tait – drums, percussion
- Dino Bardot – guitar, backing vocals
- Bob Hardy – bass

=== Additional contributors ===
- Mark Ralph – production, mixing
- Matt Colton – mastering
- Gemma Chester – engineering
- Josh Green – engineering
- Anthony Ryan Denton – engineering assistance
- Clara Luciani – background vocals

== Charts ==
Chart performance for The Human Fear
Chart (2025)	Peak position
Austrian Albums (Ö3 Austria)	6
Belgian Albums (Ultratop Flanders)	33
Belgian Albums (Ultratop Wallonia)	17
Croatian International Albums (HDU)	1
Dutch Albums (Album Top 100)	31
French Albums (SNEP)	29
French Rock & Metal Albums (SNEP)	3
German Albums (Offizielle Top 100)	11
Italian Albums (FIMI)	84
Japanese Albums (Oricon)	31
Polish Albums (ZPAV)	7
Scottish Albums (Official Charts)	1
Spanish Albums (PROMUSICAE)	31
Swiss Albums (Schweizer Hitparade)	6
UK Albums (Official Charts)	3
UK Independent Albums (Official Charts)	1
US Top Album Sales (Billboard)	40

== See also ==
- List of number-one albums of 2025 (Croatia)
