= Jackie McKeown =

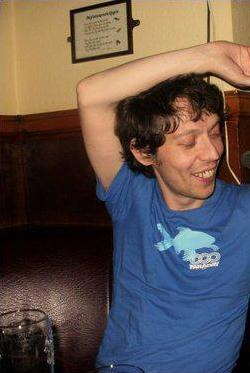
- Jackie in Helmsdale on the Edwyn Collins/1990s tour of the Scottish Highlands

Background information
- Birth name: John McKeown
- Born: 17 February 1971 (age 54); Bellshill, Scotland
- Genres: Indie rock
- Occupation: Musician
- Instrument(s): Vocals guitars
- Years active: 1992–present
- Labels: Rough Trade

Jackie McKeown (born John McKeown; 17 February 1971) is the Scottish former lead singer and guitarist for the Glasgow indie rock band The Yummy Fur who plays in 1990s.

== Early life ==
Born in Bellshill, Scotland, McKeown grew up in Blantyre near Glasgow. His sister is Jane “Jane Egypt” McKeown from the band Lungleg and she credits him with being the reason why she started playing music. His early teenage years were coloured by obsessions with David Bowie and European art cinema. At the age of 16 he began playing guitar and writing songs, forming his first bands, Glass Candle and Subliminal Girls, after leaving school in 1988.

== Career ==
=== The Yummy Fur ===
Just prior to moving to Glasgow in 1992, he formed The Yummy Fur with Jamie McMorrow. He also performed in Cotton Gum and played guitar in LungLeg (his sister Jane's band) for a UK tour. In the late 90s he often played lead guitar for Comet Gain and performs on their 1999 album Tigertown Pictures.

After The Yummy Fur decided to split in December 1999, McKeown turned thirty, got married and attended university for the first time, studying film theory. Having become tired of playing guitar, he formed a short-lived electronic pop band called The Girls with former Yummy Fur member and current Franz Ferdinand frontman Alex Kapranos which performed live only once (in Glasgow).

=== The Mars Hotel ===
In 2001 Mckeown began collaborating with The Yummy Fur's Paul Thomson, making absurdist electronic pop under the name 10,000 Volt Ghost. With the addition of Jenni McKenzie, this outfit became The Mars Hotel (Thomson soon leaving to form Pro Forma then Franz Ferdinand with fellow ex-Yummy Fur member Alex Kapranos) The Mars Hotel performed its last show on New Year's Eve 2004.

=== 1990s ===
McKeown began writing and recording songs with Michael McGaughrin. This became 1990s with the addition of former Yummy Fur bassist Jamie McMorrow. It was at this time that the nickname 'Jackie' was given to him via his bandmates. After a handful of gigs, 1990s were signed to the label Rough Trade Records and released the albums Cookies (2007) and Kicks (2009). 1990s performed extensively throughout Europe, America, Canada, Australia, Japan and Brazil. Over the winter of 2010/2011, they recorded a third album but, since parting ways with RoughTrade, it remains unreleased.

=== Trans ===
It was announced on 21 August 2013 that McKeown will collaborate with guitarist Bernard Butler under the name of Trans. The band made their live debut at the 2013 Liverpool Psychedelic Festival. The band released two EPs.
