= Emotion Pictures =

Emotion Pictures may refer to:

- A book, written by Wim Wenders.
- A song, by the band Comet Gain on the album Broken Record Prayers.
- A video, by the band Silverchair featured on the DVD of The Best of Volume 1.
