= Feel the Love Go =

Single by Franz Ferdinand

from the album Always Ascending
- Released: 8 January 2018
- Recorded: 2016–2017
- Genre: Dance-rock; electronic
- Length: 4:46 (album version); 3:17 (edited version)
- Label: Domino
- Songwriter(s): Julian Corrie; Bob Hardy; Alex Kapranos; Paul Thomson
- Producer(s): Philippe Zdar

Franz Ferdinand singles chronology
"Always Ascending" (2017)	"Feel the Love Go" (2018)	"Lazy Boy" (2018)

"Feel the Love Go" is a song by Scottish indie rock band Franz Ferdinand. It was released on 8 January 2018 as the second single from the band's fifth studio album, Always Ascending (2018). The song was cut down to a shorter length for airplay, as with the previous single "Always Ascending".

== Background and release ==
The band recorded the album at RAK Studios in London and Motorbass Studios in Paris. The song debuted on Zane Lowe's Beats 1 show on 8 January 2018 and was released as a download and on streaming services the same day.

== Music video ==
The song received a music video directed by Diane Martel who had previously directed the band's music videos for "Do You Want To" and "Evil Eye" with the video being filmed in Valencia, California. It stars band frontman Alex Kapranos as a zany faith healer. It was originally made exclusively available to watch via Apple Music, but was eventually uploaded to YouTube on 21 January 2018.

== Track listing ==
Download and streaming release
No.	Title	Length
1.	"Feel the Love Go"	4:46

Edited version
No.	Title	Length
1.	"Feel the Love Go" (edit)	3:17

== Charts ==
Chart (2018)	Peak position
Belgium (Ultratip Bubbling Under Flanders)	38
Belgium (Ultratip Bubbling Under Wallonia)	44
Mexico Ingles Airplay (Billboard)	38
