= Dino Bardot =

British musician (born 1972)

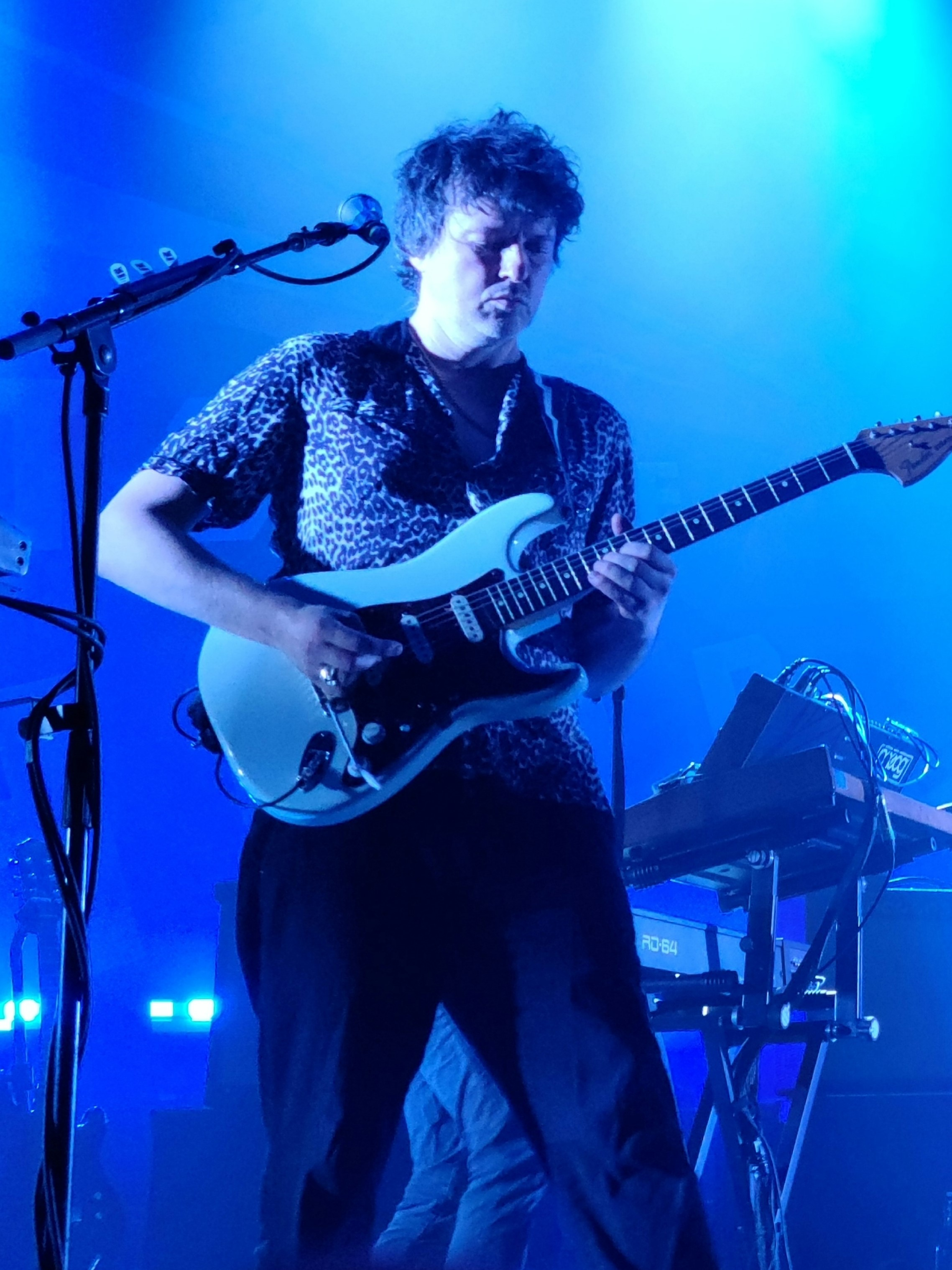
- Bardot performing with Franz Ferdinand in 2022

Background information
- Born: 8 May 1972 (age 54); Glasgow, Scotland
- Genre: Indie rock
- Occupation: Musician
- Instruments: Guitar, bass
- Years active: 1997–present
- Member of: 1990s; Franz Ferdinand
- Formerly of: Stinky Munchkins; V-Twin; Wife Vs. Secretary; The Yummy Fur

Dino Bardot (/ˈdiːnoʊ bɑːrˈdoʊ/ bar-DOH; born 8 May 1972) is a Scottish musician. He is the guitarist for indie rock band Franz Ferdinand and previously played guitar or bass for the indie bands 1990s, Stinky Munchkins, The Yummy Fur, V-Twin, and Wife Vs. Secretary.

== Early life and education ==
Bardot was born on 8 May 1972 in Glasgow, Scotland. His grandfather René Bardot was Brigitte Bardot's uncle. He attended Duncan Of Jordanston College Of Art and Design in Dundee, Scotland and graduated in 1994. He later attended the Glasgow School of Art, completing a Masters in Sound for the Moving Image in 2016.

== Career ==
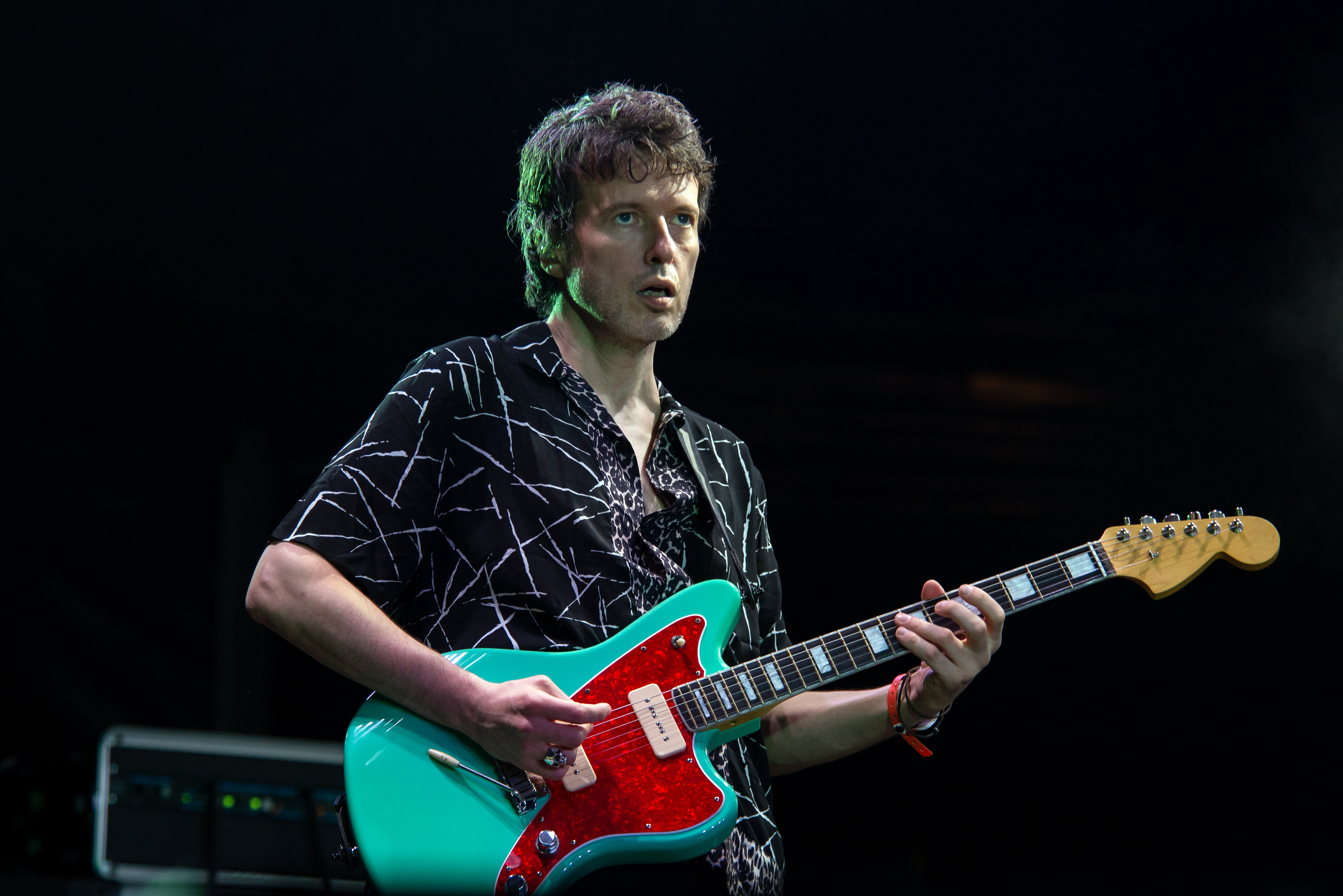
Bardot performing with Franz Ferdinand in 2019

=== V-Twin ===
V-Twin were a rock band formed in 1997, comprising Jason MacPhail (vocals) and Michael McGaughrin (drums), with a number of lineups including other musicians, before bass player, Bobby Kildea, and guitarist, Bardot became permanent members. The band released a number of singles between 1998 and 2002, on the Domino Recording Company label, before their debut album, The Blues is a Minefield, was released 28 October 2002.

=== Stinky Munchkins ===
In January 2007 Bardot (guitar, vocals), Daryl Doll (vocals, percussion), Charlie Milne (guitar), Matt Gallus (bass) and Bix Cosmo (drums) formed Stinky Munchkins. The band released a single, "Release the Lions" on 6 August 2007 on the Art Goes Pop label. "Release the Lions” and the B-side, "Bad Timing" were co-written by Bardot, Doll and Milne. Milne performed under the name Charlie Hong-Deen.

=== 1990s ===
In late 2007 he joined the 1990s, replacing founding member and guitarist, Jamie McMorrow, played the bass on the Australian and North American legs of the band's world tour. In early 2008 he was confirmed as a permanent member of the band, joining Jackie McKeown (guitar, vocals) and Michael McGaughrin (drums). Bardot performed on 1990s' second album, Kicks, which was released in March 2009 on Rough Trade Records. He wrote two of the songs on the album, "Local Science" and "Sparks", and co-wrote "I Don't Even Know What That Is", "Balthazar" and "59", the later being released as a single. Over the winter of 2010/2011, the band recorded a third album, Nude Restaurant, which was released on 24 June 2022.

=== Wife vs Secretary ===
In 2012 Bardot joined Charlie Milne (vocals, piano), Ally Batten (bass) and Mark O’ Donnell (drums) forming Wife vs Secretary. Though it was named after the Clark Gable film of the same name, the band vowed not to watch it.

=== The Yummy Fur ===
In 2017 Bardot on bass joined a re-formed The Yummy Fur, with original member John McKeown (vocals, guitar) and Paul Thomson (drums).

=== Franz Ferdinand ===
Bardot joined Franz Ferdinand in May 2017, replacing founding member Nick McCarthy. Whilst Bardot joined the band prior to the release of the band's fifth studio album, Always Ascending, in February 2018, it was after the recording sessions of the album had been completed.
