= Cookies (album) =

Studio album by 1990s
- Released: 14 May 2007
- Recorded: Autumn 2006
- Studios: West Heath Studios, London
- Genre: Indie rock
- Length: 36:40
- Label: Rough Trade
- Producer: Bernard Butler

1990s chronology
Cookies (2007)	Kicks (2009)

Professional ratings
Aggregate scores
Source	Rating
Metacritic	74/100
Review scores
Source	Rating
AllMusic	4/5 stars
NME	(7/10)
The Observer	4/5 stars
Pitchfork	(8.1/10)
Rolling Stone	4/5 stars
Stranger	(Positive)
This Is Fake DIY	4/5 stars

Cookies is the first album from the Scottish indie rock band 1990s, released on 14 May 2007 by Rough Trade. This album was number 23 on Rolling Stone's list of the Top 50 Albums of 2007. "Situation" was number 36 on Rolling Stone's list of the 100 Best Songs of 2007.

== Release ==
"You're Supposed to Be My Friend" is the second single taken from Cookies, released on October 30, 2006. It was accompanied by a music video featuring Jackie McKeown and the other band members getting beaten up by screaming female fans, leaving them bleeding. The song is played in the 2010 movie Diary of a Wimpy Kid. It was also played at the start of "Hell Hath No Fury", the fourth episode in the first series of Castle.

The third single, "See You at the Lights" was released on April 16, 2007. The track "Super Legal" features co-vocals by Lovefoxxx and is allegedly about an incident in which the band were 'properly kidnapped' by a group of girls at All Tomorrow's Parties and taken to their chalet for twelve hours and made to sing.

== Reception ==
Eric Harvey of Pitchfork gave Cookies a rating of 8.1 out of 10. He stated the record was the sound of, "a reveler reinvigorated, shoved into a decidedly larger public eye and loving every minute of it in his own way." He also stated that the record was devoted to "having fun at all costs." Stephanie Butler of PopMatters wrote that Cookies, "Sounds like these guys have been playing in crowded bars for gyrating, drunken art students for years. And that’s a very good thing."

Tim Sendra, writing for AllMusic, described Cookies as "off-kilter, spunky and often laugh-out-loud hilarious post-punk influenced pop that ropes in the best elements of Art Brut, the Libertines, Comet Gain and the B-52's." Sendra noted what he called the band's "sarcastic, knowing and sassy lyrical pose", writing that "if you aren't in the mood for goofy, silly rock and roll with no depth or greater meaning, you might want to hurl the record through the nearest window."

== Track listing ==
1. "You Made Me Like It" (Michael McGaughrin, Jackie McKeown) - 3:10
2. "See You at the Lights" (McGaughrin, McKeown) - 2:55
3. "Cult Status" (McKeown) - 2:56
4. "Arcade Precinct" (McGaughrin, McKeown) - 3:13
5. "Is There a Switch for That?" (McGaughrin, McKeown) - 2:09
6. "Enjoying Myself" (McGaughrin, McKeown) - 2:28
7. "You're Supposed to Be My Friend" (McKeown) - 3:38
8. "Pollokshields" (McKeown) - 2:24
9. "Risque Pictures" (McGaughrin, McKeown, Jamie McMorrow) - 3:12
10. "Weed" (McKeown) - 3:26
11. "Thinking of Not Going" (McKeown) - 2:02
12. "Situation" (McKeown) - 5:07

== Personnel ==
1990s

- Jackie McKeown – guitar, vocals
- Jamie McMorrow – bass
- Michael McGaughrin – drums, vocals

Technical

- Bernard Butler – producer
- Sebastian Lewsley – engineer
- Jeff Teader – design, layout
- Jane McKeown – cover photography
- Scarlet Page – back cover photography
- Lauren McPhee – inside photography

== Singles ==
- "You Made Me Like It" (2006)
- "You're Supposed to Be My Friend" (2006)
- "See You at the Lights" (2007)

== Music videos ==
- "You Made Me Like It" (2006)
- "You're Supposed to Be My Friend" (2006)
- "See You at the Lights" (2007)
- "You Made Me Like It" (Re-release) (2007)
