= Casino Classics (Comet Gain album) =

Studio album by Comet Gain
- Released: 16 March 1995
- Genre: Indie pop, pop, punk rock, rock
- Length: 44:28
- Label: Wiiija/X-Mas

Comet Gain chronology
| Casino Classics (1995) | Magnetic Poetry (1997) |

Professional ratings
Review scores
| Source | Rating |
|---|---|
| AllMusic | 4/5 stars |

Casino Classics is the debut album by the British indie pop band Comet Gain. It was released in 1995 on Wiiija in the UK, and in 1996 as a co-release with X-Mas in the US.

== Background ==
Comet Gain was formed in 1992 by guitarist/vocalist David Christian (AKA David Feck or Charlie Damage), originall bassist George Wright, and drummer Phil Sutton. Wright was soon replaced by Jax Coombes, and lineup expanded to include additional vocalist Sarah Bleach, and guitarist Sam Pluck. This lineup recorded their debut album, Casino Classics, released in 1995 on Wiiija. The liner notes were provided by Television Personalities frontman Dan Treacy. It was released in the US with X-Mas in October 1996.

== Critical reception ==
Steve McGuirl writing for CMJ called it "an eclectic debut record that runs from punk to la-la indie-pop". Tiny Mix Tapes stated that Casino Classics had "alternate touches of twee and jangly power pop." AllMusic wrote that the "combination of shambling sounds and charming songwriting makes for a rather lovable album."

== Track listing ==
| No. | Title | Length |
|---|---|---|
| 1. | "Footstompers" | 2:27 |
| 2. | "Million and Nine" | 3:23 |
| 3. | "Turnpike County Blue" | 2:52 |
| 4. | "Last Night" | 4:28 |
| 5. | "Original Arrogance" | 1:39 |
| 6. | "Another Girl" | 3:23 |
| 7. | "Music Upstairs" | 3:25 |
| 8. | "Villain" | 2:35 |
| 9. | "Stay with Me" | 4:54 |
| 10. | "Charlie" | 3:03 |
| 11. | "Just Fourteen" | 3:10 |
| 12. | "Ghost of the Roman Empire" | 2:23 |
| 13. | "Intergalactic Starbed" | 5:06 |
| 14. | "Chevron Action Flash" | 2:15 |

US bonus tracks
| No. | Title | Length |
|---|---|---|
| 15. | "Aliens at War" | 2:06 |
| 16. | "A Kind of Loving" | 3:04 |
| 17. | "Untitled Track" | 0:37 |

== Personnel ==
- David Christian - guitar, vocals
- Jax Coombes - bass
- Phil Sutton - drums
- Sarah Bleach - vocals
- Sam Pluck - guitar
