= Réalistes =

Studio album by Comet Gain
- Released: 19 March 2002
- Genre: Indie pop
- Length: 39:19
- Label: (United States) Kill Rock Stars (United Kingdom) Milou

Comet Gain chronology
Tigertown Pictures (1998)	Réalistes (2002)	City Fallen Leaves (2005)

Professional ratings
Review scores
Source	Rating
Allmusic	4.5/5 stars
Drowned in Sound	2/10
Pitchfork Media	6.9/10 link

Réalistes is the fourth album by British indie pop band Comet Gain. It features Christopher Appelgren of The Pattern and the PeeChees on drums, and guest appearances by Peter Momtchiloff (playing lap steel on "Carry on Living"), Kathleen Hanna (adding vocals on "Ripped-Up Suit!"), and The Aislers Set (doing handclaps).

== Track listing ==
No.	Title	Writer(s)	Length
1.	"The Kids at the Club"		4:13
2.	"Why I Try to Look So Bad"		2:54
3.	"I Close My Eyes to Think of God"		1:56
4.	"My Defiance"		3:17
5.	"Carry on Living" (featuring Peter Momtchiloff)		2:50
6.	"Moments in the Snow"		2:51
7.	"Ripped-Up Suit!" (featuring Kathleen Hanna)	Kathleen Hanna	3:48
8.	"She Never Understood"	Alan McGee	3:56
9.	"Movies"		3:22
10.	"Labour"		2:57
11.	"Don't Fall in Love if You Want to Die in Peace"		3:22
12.	"Réalistes"		3:53
