= City Fallen Leaves =

Studio album by Comet Gain
- Released: 8 November 2005
- Genre: Indie pop
- Length: 51:13
- Label: (United States) Kill Rock Stars (United Kingdom) The Track & Field Organisation

Comet Gain chronology
Réalistes (2002)	City Fallen Leaves (2005)	Broken Record Prayers (2008)

Professional ratings
Review scores
Source	Rating
AllMusic	4.5/5 stars
Robert Christgau	A−
Pitchfork Media	(5.9/10)
PopMatters	(5/10)

City Fallen Leaves is the fifth album by British indie pop band Comet Gain.

== Track listing ==
No.	Title	Length
1.	"The Fists in the Pocket"	3:13
2.	"Days I Forgot to Write Down"	5:32
3.	"Daydream Scars"	3:00
4.	"Bored Roar"	2:53
5.	"Seven Sisters to Silverlake"	2:43
6.	"This English Melancholy"	4:06
7.	"The Punk Got Fucked"	4:19
8.	"The Story of the Vivian Girls"	1:42
9.	"Just One More Summer Before I Go"	2:08
10.	"Draw a Smile Upon an Egg"	2:24
11.	"Fingernailed for You"	2:49
12.	"Your Robert!"	4:22
13.	"Gone Before We Open Our Eyes"	3:24
14.	"Right Now? No"	1:57
15.	"The Ballad of a Mix Tape"	6:01
