= Magnetic Poetry (album) =

Studio album by Comet Gain
- Released: 3 October 1997
- Genre: Pop, punk rock, soul
- Length: 24:19
- Label: (United Kingdom) Wiiija (United States) Beggars Banquet USA (as Sneaky)

Comet Gain chronology
Casino Classics (1995)	Magnetic Poetry (1997)	Tigertown Pictures (1998)

Professional ratings
Review scores
Source	Rating
Allmusic	3.5/5 stars
Allmusic	(for Sneaky)
NME	5/10 stars

Magnetic Poetry is the second album by British indie pop band Comet Gain. The album consists of songs written by frontman David Feck only, following the departure of the remainder of Comet Gain (taking the songs they penned with them) to form the band Velocette. The album had extra tracks added for its American release and was re-named Sneaky.

== Track listing ==
No.	Title	Length
1.	"Strength"	3:05
2.	"Raspberries"	3:39
3.	"Language of the Spy"	1:22
4.	"Steps to the Sea"	2:53
5.	"These Are the Dreams of the Working Girl"	2:54
6.	"Pier Angeli"	5:10
7.	"Final Horses"	2:36
8.	"Tighten Up"	2:40

Sneaky bonus tracks
No.	Title	Length
9.	"Say Yes" (originally from Say Yes EP)	3:05
10.	"A Film by Kenneth Anger" (originally from Say Yes EP)	2:21
11.	"Sunsets at Her Window"	2:54
12.	"Shining Path" (originally from The Gettin' Ready EP)	2:45
