= Always Ascending (song) =

Song by Franz Ferdinand

Single by Franz Ferdinand

from the album Always Ascending
- Released: 25 October 2017
- Recorded: 2016–17
- Genre: Disco-rock; new wave; post-punk; art pop
- Length: 5:21 (album version); 3:49 (edited version)
- Label: Domino
- Songwriters: Julian Corrie; Bob Hardy; Alex Kapranos; Paul Thomson
- Producer: Philippe Zdar

Franz Ferdinand singles chronology
"Demagogue" (2016)	"Always Ascending" (2017)	"Feel the Love Go" (2018)

Music video
- ”Always Ascending on YouTube

"Always Ascending" is a song by Scottish indie rock band Franz Ferdinand. It was released as the lead single from their fifth studio album of the same name on 25 October 2017. Two days before the release of the song the band released a clip of the song. It released along with a shorter edited version.

== Background and release ==
After their 2013 album Right Thoughts, Right Words, Right Action the band formed a supergroup with the American rock band Sparks by the name of FFS in 2014. The band's name is an abbreviation of Franz Ferdinand Sparks. The group's existence was formally announced on 9 March 2015. In July 2016 founding guitarist Nick McCarthy left the band to focus on side-projects and spending time with his family, and was replaced with guitarist Dino Bardot and keyboardist Julian Corrie.

Leading up to the song's release the band released a snippet of the song on 23 October. The song was released with an edited version, which has the roughly one minute 15 second long piano intro and the shorter piano outro cut out.

The song makes extensive use of a Shepard Tone throughout, adding emphasis to the title of the track.

== Music video ==
A music video for "Always Ascending" was released on 4 December 2017. It was directed by AB/CD/CD, who previously worked with the band on the music video for their FFS song "Johnny Delusional". Described as "vivid" by Rolling Stone, the video features slow motion scenes of the band's members floating around in front of abstract backgrounds. Band frontman Alex Kapranos described it as "pretty much a typical Sunday afternoon round at Franz Ferdinand's flat".

== Track listing ==
Download and streaming release
No.	Title	Length
1.	"Always Ascending"	5:21

Edited version
No.	Title	Length
1.	"Always Ascending" (edit)	3:49

Remix EP
No.	Title	Length
1.	"Always Ascending" (Cassius Remix)	8:43
2.	"Always Ascending" (Prins Thomas Remix)	10:03
3.	"Always Ascending" (Nina Kraviz House Remix)	3:25

Nina Kraviz Remixes
No.	Title	Length
1.	"Always Ascending" (Nina Kraviz Techno Remix)	7:52
2.	"Always Ascending" (Nina Kraviz Late Night Remix)	6:47

== Charts ==
Chart performance for "Always Ascending"
Chart (2017–2018)	Peak position
Belgium (Ultratip Bubbling Under Flanders)	13
Belgium (Ultratip Bubbling Under Wallonia)	31
Canada Rock (Billboard)	47
Japan Hot Overseas (Billboard)	20
Mexico Ingles Airplay (Billboard)	30
US Alternative Airplay (Billboard)	25
US Rock & Alternative Airplay (Billboard)	50
