= Fireraisers Forever! =

Studio album by Comet Gain
- Released: 11 October 2019
- Length: 44:39
- Label: Tapete

Comet Gain chronology
Paperback Ghosts (2014)	Fireraisers Forever! (2019)

Professional ratings
Aggregate scores
Source	Rating
Metacritic	85/100
Review scores
Source	Rating
AllMusic	4.5/5 stars
Louder Than War	9/10

Fireraisers Forever! is the eighth studio album by British Indie pop band Comet Gain. It was released on 11 October 2019 under Tapete Records.

The first single from the album, "Mid 8Ts" was released on 29 August 2019.

== Critical reception ==
Fireraisers Forever! was met with universal acclaim reviews from critics. At Metacritic, which assigns a weighted average rating out of 100 to reviews from mainstream publications, this release received an average score of 85, based on 4 reviews.

=== Accolades ===
Publication	Accolade	Rank	Ref.
AllMusic	Best of 2019	N/A	

== Track listing ==
Fireraisers Forever! track listing
No.	Title	Length
1.	"We're All Fucking Morons"	2:43
2.	"The Girl with the Melted Mind and Her Fear of the Open Door"	2:35
3.	"Bad Nite at the Mustache"	5:30
4.	"Society of Inner Nothing"	3:59
5.	"Victor Jara, Finally Found!"	2:40
6.	"The Godfrey Brothers"	5:37
7.	"Your Life on Your Knees"	3:08
8.	"Mid 8Ts"	3:09
9.	"The Institute Debased"	4:01
10.	"Her 33rd Perfect Goodbye"	4:35
11.	"Werewolf Jacket"	2:48
12.	"I Can't Live Here Anymore"	3:51
