= Letters to Ordinary Outsiders =

Studio album by Comet Gain
- Released: 6 June 2025
- Genre: Indie pop; jangle pop
- Length: 47:15
- Label: Tapete
- Producer: Sean Read

Comet Gain chronology
Wintertime Ghosts (2024)	Letters to Ordinary Outsiders (2025)

Letters to Ordinary Outsiders is the twelfth studio album by British indie pop band Comet Gain. It was released on 6 June 2025 via Tapete Records.

== Background ==
Produced by Sean Read, the album consists of twelve tracks ranging between two and five minutes each, with a total runtime of approximately forty-seven minutes. It was noted as an indie pop album. The album is composed of songs that were previously released by the band on platforms, such as Bandcamp, alongside several newer tracks.

== Reception ==
Professional ratings
Review scores
Source	Rating
AllMusic	4/5 stars
Uncut	8/10 stars

Tim Sendra of AllMusic remarked in his review of the album, "They've earned their right to be thought of as one of the great bands of their time, and records like Letters to Ordinary Outsiders are the reason why." Louder Than War's Andy Brown described the album as "a bold and inspired release from a band that are still madly in love with that wild, dirty, pounding and ecstatic sound." Jason Anderson of Uncut rated it eight out of ten, describing it as a "scrappy yet sharply rendered ninth album" that "makes for a very endearing restatement of purpose." BrooklynVegan remarked, "The album was conceived as a series of postcards to those 'ordinary outsiders', and this batch of open-hearted jangle pop anthems doesn't require membership in a secret club to enjoy."

== Track listing ==
All tracks are written by David Christian.

Letters to Ordinary Outsiders track listing
No.	Title	Length
1.	"The Ballad of the Lives We Led"	4:51
2.	"If They Can't Find the Way Then There's No Way Out"	3:28
3.	"Beat of the Veins"	3:25
4.	"We Were Paintermen"	4:12
5.	"Threads!"	4:22
6.	"Yeah, I Know It's a Wonderful Life, but There's Always Further You Can Fall"	3:50
7.	"Do You Remember 'The Lites on the Water'"	3:13
8.	"Danbury Road"	4:10
9.	"Buildings"	2:41
10.	"Hearts of Scars"	3:14
11.	"Ashtray Cult"	4:49
12.	"Maybe One Day It'll Really Happen"	5:00
Total length:		47:15

== Personnel ==
Credits adapted from the album's liner notes and Tidal.

=== Comet Gain ===
- Ben Phillipson – guitar, backing vocals
- James Hornsey – bass guitar
- Anne Laure Guillain – organ, piano, backing vocals, artwork, design
- Rachel Evans – vocals
- Robin Silas Christian – drums
- David Christian – vocals, guitars, artwork, design

=== Additional contributors ===
- Sean Read – production, brass. synthesizer, electric piano, backing vocals
- Chris Appelgren – artwork, design
