= Paperback Ghosts =

Studio album by Comet Gain
- Released: 7 July 2014
- Length: 45:26
- Label: Fortuna Pop!

Comet Gain chronology
Howl of the Lonely Crowd (2011)	Paperback Ghosts (2014)	Fireraisers Forever! (2019)

Professional ratings
Aggregate scores
Source	Rating
Metacritic	75/100
Review scores
Source	Rating
Allmusic	4/5 stars

Paperback Ghosts is the seventh studio album by British Indie pop band Comet Gain. It was released in July 2014 under Fortuna Pop!.

== Track list ==
No.	Title	Length
1.	"Long After Tonite's Candles Are Blown"	4:49
2.	"Sad Love and Other Short Stories"	4:11
3.	"Behind the House She Lived In"	2:19
4.	"Wait 'Til December"	4:08
5.	"Breaking Open the Head Part 1"	3:53
6.	"The Last Love Letter"	4:30
7.	"Sixteen Oh Four"	2:05
8.	"(All The) Avenue Girls"	2:34
9.	"Your Haunted Heart"	2:59
10.	"Far from the Pavilion"	4:32
11.	"An Orchid Stuck Inside Her Throat"	3:13
12.	"Confessions of a Daydream"	6:13
