= Howl of the Lonely Crowd =

Studio album by Comet Gain
- Released: 23 May 2011
- Genre: Indie pop
- Length: 42:09
- Label: (United Kingdom) Fortuna Pop! (United States) What's Your Rupture?
- Producer: Ryan Jarman, Edwyn Collins

Comet Gain chronology
Broken Record Prayers (2008)	Howl of the Lonely Crowd (2011)	Paperback Ghosts (2014)

Professional ratings
Review scores
Source	Rating
AllMusic	4.5/5 stars
Pitchfork	7.3/10

Howl of the Lonely Crowd is an album by British indie pop band Comet Gain. It was the band's first album to be released via the Fortuna Pop! record label.

== Track listing ==
All tracks written by David Christian except where noted.

No.	Title	Writer(s)	Length
1.	"Clang of the Concrete Swans"		5:05
2.	"The Weekend Dreams"	David Christian, Nicolas Ray	3:07
3.	"An Arcade from the Warm Rain That Falls"		2:56
4.	"She Had Daydreams"		2:02
5.	"Working Circle Explosive!"		3:44
6.	"Yoona Baines"		2:08
7.	"Herbert Huncke, Pt.2"		4:01
8.	"After Midnight, After It's All Gone Wrong"		5:50
9.	"A Memorial for Nobody I Know"		2:07
10.	"Ballad of Frankie Machine"		3:05
11.	"Some of Us Don't Want to Be Saved"		4:31
12.	"Thee Ecstatic Library"		2:03
13.	"In a Lonely Place"	Christian, Ray	1:30
