= Govan Municipal Buildings =

Municipal building in Govan, Scotland

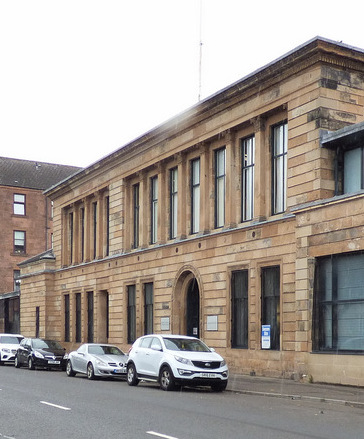
- The building in 2018

- Shown in Glasgow
- 55.8612°N 4.3086°W
- Location: Orkney Street, Govan

History
- Built: 1866

Site notes
- Architect: John Burnet
- Architectural style: Greek Revival style

Listed Building – Category B
- Official name: Govan Municipal Buildings, 18–20 Orkney Street, Glasgow
- Designated: 15 May 1987
- Reference no.: LB33361

Govan Municipal Buildings is a former local authority building on Orkney Street in Govan, Scotland. The building, which was the meeting place of the local burgh council in the 19th century, is a Category B listed building.

== History ==
Following significant population growth, largely associated with the shipbuilding industry, the area became a police burgh in 1864. The new police commissioners initially met in Hinshelwood's hall in Greenhaugh Street but, after finding this arrangement inadequate, decided to commission dedicated municipal buildings for the burgh. The site they chose, on the west side of Albert Street (since renamed Orkney Street), was occupied by a goods shed for the Glasgow and Paisley Joint Railway.

The foundation stone, incorporating a time capsule, for the new building was laid in 1866. It was designed by John Burnet in the Greek Revival style, built in ashlar stone and was completed in 1867. The design involved a broadly symmetrical main frontage facing onto Albert Street. The central bay contained a round headed doorway with an architrave. The other four bays on the ground floor were fenestrated with sash windows. On the first floor, there was a Corinthian order pilastrade involving seven recessed sash windows and, at roof level, there was a modillioned cornice and a central roof lantern. Internally, the principal room was an assembly hall on the first floor which could accommodate 600 people.

A major fire caused considerable damage in 1882. The building was subsequently restored and extended in the same style by four extra bays to the south, to create extra accommodation for the fire service and police force, in 1899. A new cell block stretching back at the rear was added at around the same time. The building ceased to be the local seat of government when the burgh council relocated to the new Govan Town Hall in Govan Road in 1901.

It is claimed that the German Deputy Führer, Rudolf Hess, was briefly held in the building after his flight to Scotland in May 1941 during the Second World War. This seems likely as Orkney Street is on the route between Waterfoot, where he was captured, and Maryhill Barracks where he was interrogated. However, other sources claim that he was held at Giffnock Police Station. After being charged with breach of the peace, the footballer, Frank McAvennie, was held in the building in November 1987: he was found not guilty at the subsequent trial.

The building continued to serve as a police station, until the police service moved to the new Helen Street police station in 1998. Following a major refurbishment at a cost of £3.6 million in 2008, the building has operated as the Orkney Street Enterprise Centre; the cell block at the rear was converted for use as serviced office space for small businesses.

== See also ==
- List of listed buildings in Glasgow/4
