= List of listed buildings in Glasgow/4 =

This is a list of listed buildings in Glasgow, Scotland.

== List ==
Name	Location	Date listed	Geo-coordinates	Notes	Category	LB number	Image
40 Newlands Road And Lubnaig Road, The Oaks Including Garden Walls And Gatepiers			55°49′12″N 4°16′52″W		B	33948	Upload Photo
42 Newlands Road And 7 Lubnaig Road, Brackley, Including Walls And Gatepiers			55°49′12″N 4°16′49″W		B	33949	Upload Photo
988-1006 (Even Nos) Pollokshaws Road, Camphill Gate			55°49′56″N 4°16′42″W		B	33954	Upload Photo
95 Morrison Street, 34-44 (Even Nos) Dalintober Street, 19-37 (Odd Nos) Carnoustie Street, "Co-Operative House"			55°51′13″N 4°16′10″W		B	33971	Upload another image
19,21 Broompark Drive, Including Gatepiers			55°51′41″N 4°13′27″W		B	33888	Upload Photo
164, 166 Craigpark, Snooker Club Including Gatepiers			55°51′49″N 4°13′17″W		B	33895	Upload Photo
35, 37 Westercraigs, 36,38 Broompark Drive			55°51′39″N 4°13′26″W		B	33910	Upload Photo
17-23 (Odd Nos) Whitevale Street, St Anne's Church And Presbytery			55°51′27″N 4°12′58″W		A	33912	Upload Photo
230 Auldhouse Road Including Gatepiers			55°49′08″N 4°17′58″W		C(S)	33914	Upload Photo
443 Clarkston Road, Gartly Street, Muirend Trustee Savings Bank, Originally Savings Bank Of Glasgow			55°48′37″N 4°16′14″W		B	33917	Upload Photo
84, 86 Clarkston Road, Couper Institute And Library			55°48′57″N 4°15′53″W		B	33918	Upload Photo
90, 92 Clarkston Road, Cathcart South Church Of Scotland, Including Hall			55°48′55″N 4°15′56″W		B	33919	Upload Photo
45 Netherlee Road, "Cartbank"			55°48′45″N 4°15′29″W		B	33943	Upload Photo
61, 63 Netherlee Road, "Holmwood"			55°48′35″N 4°15′34″W		A	33944	Upload another image
Graham Square/Bellgrove Street/14-28 Melbourne Street/Moore Street Meat And Cattle Markets, And Associated Buildings			55°51′28″N 4°13′36″W		B	33842	Upload another image
88 Green Street, St James Public School Including Janitor's House And Railings			55°51′10″N 4°13′59″W		B	33843	Upload Photo
50-56 (Even Nos) Old Dalmarnock Road, Church Of The Sacred Heart Including Gatepiers And Presbytery			55°50′46″N 4°13′24″W		A	33855	Upload Photo
Gartloch Road, Gartloch Hospital, Asylum Section, Hospital Section And Original Nurses' Home			55°52′46″N 4°06′21″W		A	33868	Upload another image
Alexandra Parade, Alexandra Park, Cast-Iron Fountain			55°51′52″N 4°12′30″W		A	33880	Upload another image See more images
1208-1220, (Even Nos) Cathcart Road, Battlefield East Church And Hall, Including Gatepiers			55°49′25″N 4°15′32″W		B	33803	Upload another image
70-74 (Even Nos) Mount Annan Drive Including Boundary Walls			55°49′26″N 4°15′23″W		B	33808	Upload Photo
Bridgeton Cross, Shelter			55°50′56″N 4°13′35″W		A	33818	Upload another image
103-111 (Odd Nos) French Street, 34-66 (Even Nos) Dora Street, (Former Barrowfield Weaving Factory)			55°50′31″N 4°13′20″W		B	33830	Upload Photo
Glasgow Green, Nelson Monument, Including Railings			55°51′05″N 4°14′27″W		A	33837	Upload another image See more images
263-273 (Odd Nos) Garrioch Road And Railings			55°52′56″N 4°17′19″W		C(S)	33762	Upload Photo
Kelvinside Terrace, West Steps And Retaining Walls			55°52′45″N 4°17′03″W		B	33772	Upload another image
2-14 (Even Nos) Possil Road And Farnell Street, Tower Buildings			55°52′28″N 4°15′40″W		B	33776	Upload Photo
361-367 (Odd Nos) St George's Road, Lampost And Railings			55°52′20″N 4°16′01″W		B	33781	Upload Photo
67 Coplaw Street, 134 Butterbiggins Road, Former Glasgow Samaritan Hospital For Women Including Boundary Walls Gatepiers And Railings			55°50′25″N 4°15′44″W		B	33689	Upload another image See more images
44 Kingarth Street, Calder Street, Hutcheson's Grammar School Annexe, Janitors Lodge And Gymnasium Block			55°50′19″N 4°15′56″W		B	33694	Upload another image See more images
23, 25 And 27 Snuff Mill Road, Snuff Mill, Cathcart			55°48′49″N 4°15′32″W		C(S)	33725	Upload Photo
393 Ashgill Road, St Augustine`S Rc Church And Presbytery			55°53′46″N 4°14′21″W		B	33736	Upload Photo
11 - 29 (Odd Nos) Canal Bank, With Bank Openings			55°53′50″N 4°15′55″W		B	33739	Upload Photo
862 Shettleston Road And Wellshot Road, Carntyne Old Church And Hall, Gates And Railings			55°51′06″N 4°10′30″W		C(S)	33646	Upload Photo
64-80 (Even Nos) Tollcross Road And Helenvale Street, Parkhead Library Including Public Baths And Washhouse			55°51′01″N 4°11′44″W		B	33653	Upload another image
1-15 (Odd Nos) Westmuir Street And 1361 Duke Street			55°51′04″N 4°11′51″W		B	33656	Upload another image
135 Westmuir Street, Parkhead Careers Office Including Gatepiers And Railings			55°51′07″N 4°11′34″W		B	33657	Upload Photo
138 Carmyle Avenue, Carmyle House, Gates And Gatepiers			55°49′52″N 4°09′37″W		B	33662	Upload another image
50 And 52 Church Street, Baillieston, Old St Andrew's Church Including Boundary Walls, Gatepiers, Gates And Railings			55°50′59″N 4°06′30″W		B	33663	Upload Photo
Manse Road, Bargeddie, Netherhouse Road, Bargeddie Parish Church Including Hall, Manse, Lodge And Perimeter Walls			55°51′29″N 4°05′33″W		B	33672	Upload Photo
165, 171, 173 Butterbiggins Road, 48, 54, 60 Inglefield Street			55°50′25″N 4°15′29″W		C(S)	33681	Upload another image See more images
176-194 (Even Nos) Butterbiggins Road, 65-73 (Odd Nos) Inglefield Street, 143, 145 Coplaw Street			55°50′23″N 4°15′27″W		B	33682	Upload another image See more images
35 Coplaw Street, Leisure Centre			55°50′25″N 4°15′52″W		C(S)	33688	Upload Photo
2141 Paisley Road West, Cardonald Parish Church Including Hall			55°50′44″N 4°21′21″W		B	33603	Upload another image
Ralston Avenue 81, 85 (Struan) Including Boundary Walls And Gatepiers			55°50′32″N 4°22′03″W		B	33604	Upload Photo
5 And 7 Applecross Street, Rockvilla House, Former Canal Lock Keeper`S House			55°52′38″N 4°15′36″W		C(S)	33609	Upload Photo
40-50 (Even Nos) Speirs Wharf			55°52′26″N 4°15′28″W		B	33620	Upload Photo
184-238A (Even Nos) Saracen Street			55°53′00″N 4°15′14″W		B	33622	Upload Photo
98-100 (Even Nos) Pollokshaws Road And 3 Cavendish Street, Former Chalmer's Free Church			55°50′48″N 4°15′28″W		B	33530	Upload another image
191,193,195,197,199 Scotland Street, Former Howden's Works			55°50′57″N 4°16′21″W		B	33533	Upload Photo
84 And 86 Craigie Street, 52 Allison Street (52 Allison Court) And 2-6 (Even Nos) Allison Place			55°50′11″N 4°16′01″W		B	33542	Upload Photo
1226-1236 (Even Nos) Maryhill Road/Ruchill Street, Wyndford Club			55°53′15″N 4°17′07″W		C(S)	33543	Upload Photo
167 Ashkirk Drive, Mosspark Parish Church (Church Of Scotland)			55°50′29″N 4°19′32″W		B	33584	Upload another image
1554 Barrhead Road, 17-20 (Inclusive) Hurlethill Court, East Hurlet House			55°49′10″N 4°22′13″W		B	33585	Upload Photo
27, 29 Sherbrooke Avenue And 102 Springkell Avenue, Matheran, Including Driveway Gate And Boundary Walls			55°50′24″N 4°17′57″W		B	33471	Upload Photo
31 Sherbrooke Avenue And 105 Springkell Avenue, Oaklands, Including Boundary Walls And Gatepiers			55°50′21″N 4°17′57″W		B	33472	Upload Photo
39 Sherbrooke Avenue, Inchgarvie And Woodmailing, Including Boundary Walls And Gatepiers			55°50′20″N 4°17′54″W		B	33474	Upload Photo
525-529 (Odd Nos) Shields Road And 274 Albert Drive, Pollokshields Church (C Of S) And Hall, Gates And Railings			55°50′36″N 4°16′32″W		B	33477	Upload another image See more images
689-707 (Odd Nos) Shields Road, 16-20 (Even Nos) Glencairn Drive, 1-9 (Odd Nos) Newark Drive			55°50′21″N 4°16′37″W		B	33480	Upload Photo
96 Springkell Avenue And 398 Albert Drive, Including Boundary Walls And Gatepiers			55°50′22″N 4°17′48″W		C(S)	33484	Upload Photo
44-84 (Even Nos) Terregles Avenue And 733-745 (Odd Nos) Shields Road			55°50′17″N 4°16′35″W		C(S)	33488	Upload Photo
40-61 (Inclusive) Carlton Place And 16 Nicholson Street			55°51′13″N 4°15′19″W		A	33499	Upload another image
65-84 (Inclusive) Carlton Place And 4 South Portland Street			55°51′16″N 4°15′27″W		B	33500	Upload Photo
38 Clyde Place And 18 Centre Street, Former Kingston House			55°51′18″N 4°15′42″W		B	33501	Upload Photo
121 Eglinton Street And Bedford Street, New Bedford Picture House			55°51′02″N 4°15′33″W		B	33508	Upload another image
8-38 (Even Nos) Falfield Street, 14, 16, 20 Stromness Street And 39 Mauchline Street, Former Falfield Cotton Works			55°50′51″N 4°15′46″W		B	33511	Upload Photo
162-170 (Even Nos) Gorbals Street			55°51′00″N 4°15′16″W		A	33513	Upload another image
40 And 44 Kilbirnie Street And Return Elevations To Ritchie Street And Francis Street			55°50′49″N 4°15′46″W		B	33515	Upload Photo
53 Morrison Street, 33 Dalintober Street And Return Elevation To Laidlaw Street			55°51′12″N 4°16′07″W		B	33519	Upload Photo
115-119 (Even Nos) Paisley Road, 120-130 (Even Nos) Morrison Street And 2, 4 Laidlaw Street And 1 Dalintober Street "Paisley Road Gusset" Scws			55°51′15″N 4°16′05″W		B	33523	Upload Photo
656-674 (Even Nos) Eglinton Street And 2-28 (Even Nos) Maxwell Road			55°50′36″N 4°15′47″W		B	33404	Upload Photo
19-63 (Odd Nos) Glencairn Drive And 719, 721 Shields Road			55°50′18″N 4°16′36″W		B	33407	Upload Photo
97 Haggs Road Lodge At Pollok House			55°50′02″N 4°17′58″W		B	33412	Upload Photo
110, 112 Hamilton Avenue And Springkell Avenue, Dunholme, Including Boundary Walls And Gatepiers			55°50′21″N 4°18′13″W		B	33414	Upload Photo
165-189 (Odd Nos) Kenmure Street			55°50′30″N 4°16′21″W		B	33415	Upload another image See more images
11 Melville Street, Pollokshields Primary School Annexe, Former Pollokshields Public School Including Janitor's Lodge, Gatepiers And Railings			55°50′23″N 4°16′18″W		B	33428	Upload another image See more images
10 Newark Drive, Newark Drive Nursery School And 159 Nithsdale Road, Kilspindie, Including Boundary Walls And Gatepiers			55°50′24″N 4°16′41″W		C(S)	33434	Upload Photo
161 Nithsdale Road, Including Boundary Walls, Gatepiers And Railings			55°50′24″N 4°16′42″W		B	33438	Upload Photo
116-170 (Even Nos) Nithsdale Road, 2, 3, 4, Nithsdale Place, Kenmure Street And Leven Street			55°50′21″N 4°16′31″W		B	33445	Upload another image See more images
178 Nithsdale Road, Helenslea, Including Boundary Walls And Gatepiers			55°50′30″N 4°16′51″W		B	33447	Upload another image See more images
196 Nithsdale Road, Glengowan, Including Boundary Walls And Gatepiers			55°50′31″N 4°17′06″W		C(S)	33448	Upload Photo
206 Nithsdale Road, Braehead, Including Boundary Walls And Gatepiers			55°50′33″N 4°17′17″W		C(S)	33452	Upload Photo
2060 Pollokshaws Road, Pollok House, Bridge Over White Cart Water			55°49′37″N 4°19′05″W		A	33456	Upload another image
2060 Pollokshaws Road, Pollok House Sawmill, Power Station And Caul			55°49′33″N 4°18′59″W		B	33458	Upload Photo
Carmunnock 652 Carmunnock Road, Mid Netherton Farmhouse And Steading			55°47′49″N 4°15′02″W		C(S)	33318	Upload Photo
Carmunnock, 1 Greenside			55°47′28″N 4°14′03″W		C(S)	33319	Upload Photo
Carmunnock, 2, 4 Kirk Road			55°47′28″N 4°14′09″W		C(S)	33320	Upload Photo
Carmunnock, Kirk Road, Carmunnock Parish Church And Churchyard Including Gatepiers And Watch House			55°47′25″N 4°14′09″W		B	33322	Upload another image
Carmunnock, 34 Kirk Road			55°47′23″N 4°14′09″W		B	33327	Upload Photo
65-69 (Odd Nos) Golspie Street, Former Hill's Trust School			55°51′43″N 4°19′01″W		B	33339	Upload Photo
705, 707 Govan Road, Return Elevations To Broomloan Road, Former Savings Bank, Govan Branch			55°51′42″N 4°18′32″W		B	33342	Upload Photo
801, 805 Govan Road, 2, 4 Burleigh Street, Cardell Halls And Public House			55°51′48″N 4°18′47″W		B	33344	Upload Photo
18,20 Orkney Street Govan Police Building, Former Govan Municipal Buildings			55°51′40″N 4°18′31″W		B	33361	Upload another image
143 Woodville Street. Now Maritime House, Former Glasgow Engineering Works			55°51′18″N 4°18′24″W		B	33363	Upload Photo
241 Albert Drive And Herriet Street, (Including Academy Building To Herriet Street), Pollokshields Primary School Including Gatepiers, Playground Walls And Railings			55°50′32″N 4°16′29″W		B	33370	Upload Photo
312 Albert Drive, Including Gatepiers And Boundary Walls			55°50′37″N 4°16′46″W		B	33378	Upload another image See more images
18 Bruce Road, Including Boundary Walls And Gatepiers			55°50′41″N 4°16′54″W		B	33392	Upload Photo
28, 30 Dalziel Drive And 69 St Andrew's Drive, The Moss, Including Boundary Walls And Gatepiers			55°50′28″N 4°17′21″W		B	33395	Upload Photo
40 Dalziel Drive, Dykeneuk House, Including Boundary Walls And Gatepiers			55°50′30″N 4°17′30″W		B	33397	Upload Photo
46-50 (Even Nos) Darnley Street And 49-53 (Odd Nos) Forth Street, Miller And Lang Building, Pollokshields, Also Known As 50 Darnley Street			55°50′35″N 4°16′10″W		A	33402	Upload Photo
166, 168 West George Street And 175 Hope Street			55°51′46″N 4°15′30″W		B	33244	Upload Photo
188-194 (Even Nos) West George Street			55°51′46″N 4°15′32″W		B	33245	Upload Photo
202-226 (Even Nos) West George Street 115, 117 Wellington Street And 114-118 (Even Nos) West Campbell Street			55°51′47″N 4°15′36″W		B	33247	Upload Photo
141, 143 West Regent Street, 120-124 (Even Nos) West Campbell Street			55°51′48″N 4°15′39″W		B	33268	Upload Photo
4, 4A West Regent Street, And 64-70 (Even Nos) Renfield Street, Victoria Buildings			55°51′47″N 4°15′20″W		B	33269	Upload Photo
158-168 (Even Nos) West Regent Street And 237 West Campbell Street (Former John Ross Memorial Church For The Deaf And Institute For Adult Deaf And Dumb)			55°51′50″N 4°15′40″W		B	33278	Upload Photo
Renfield Street, William Annan Fountain			55°51′57″N 4°15′18″W		C(S)	33287	Upload Photo
1378 Springburn Road, Colston Wellpark Church, Church Of Scotland			55°53′42″N 4°13′51″W		B	33299	Upload Photo
Carmunnock, 8, 10 Busby Road			55°47′27″N 4°14′10″W		B	33314	Upload Photo
351-371 (Odd Nos) Sauchiehall Street, 97 Holland Street			55°51′56″N 4°16′01″W		B	33178	Upload another image
401-427 (Odd Nos) Sauchiehall Street And 67-73 (Odd Nos) Elmbank Street			55°51′57″N 4°16′06″W		B	33180	Upload another image
130-158 (Even Nos) Sauchiehall Street, The Savoy Centre			55°51′54″N 4°15′28″W		B	33190	Upload another image
254-290 (Even Nos) Sauchiehall Street, 5, 7 Rose Street, 2, 6 Dalhousie Street And 145, 147, 149 Renfrew Street, Mclellan Galleries			55°51′58″N 4°15′44″W		B	33192	Upload another image
73-77 (Odd Nos) Waterloo Street			55°51′37″N 4°15′47″W		C(S)	33213	Upload Photo
40-60 (Even Nos) Wellington Street 1, 3 Cadogan Street And 102-108 (Even Nos) Holm Street, Baltic Chambers			55°51′34″N 4°15′37″W		B	33218	Upload Photo
117, 121 West George Street And 38-42 (Even Nos) Renfield Street, (Former Sun Life Building)			55°51′43″N 4°15′22″W		A	33223	Upload Photo
201-203 (Odd Nos) West George Street 101-107 (Odd Nos) Wellington Street And 98 West George Lane			55°51′45″N 4°15′36″W		B	33227	Upload Photo
223-225A (Odd Nos) West George Street			55°51′46″N 4°15′39″W		B	33230	Upload Photo
149 St Vincent Street			55°51′42″N 4°15′37″W		B	33144	Upload Photo
80 St Vincent Street			55°51′42″N 4°15′20″W		B	33152	Upload Photo
140, 142 St Vincent Street And 153, 155 Hope Street, Royal Bank Building			55°51′43″N 4°15′31″W		A	33159	Upload another image
142A, 144 St Vincent Street			55°51′43″N 4°15′31″W		A	33160	Upload another image
202-228 (Even Nos) St Vincent Street			55°51′44″N 4°15′42″W		B	33163	Upload another image
219-233, (Odd Nos) Sauchiehall Street And 134-140 (Even Nos) Blythswood Street			55°51′54″N 4°15′42″W		B	33174	Upload Photo
48-88 (Even Nos) Kent Road, 7-9 (Odd Nos) Granville Street, 100 Elderslie Street			55°51′53″N 4°16′26″W		B	33080	Upload Photo
101, 103, New City Road			55°52′09″N 4°15′47″W		B	33090	Upload Photo
55 North Street And 101, 121, William Street, St Patrick's Rc Church			55°51′43″N 4°16′17″W		B	33093	Upload another image
20, 26, 28 Renfield Lane And St Vincent Lane, Former Daily Record Building			55°51′40″N 4°15′28″W		A	33099	Upload Photo
167 Renfrew Street And 11, 15 Dalhousie Street, Glasgow School Of Art			55°51′58″N 4°15′49″W		A	33105	Upload another image
347-353 (Odd Nos) Renfrew Street, Albany Mansions			55°52′00″N 4°16′12″W		B	33108	Upload another image
16 Robertson Street, Clyde Navigation Trust			55°51′25″N 4°15′39″W		A	33113	Upload Photo
60-64 (Even Nos) Robertson Street			55°51′29″N 4°15′38″W		B	33114	Upload Photo
52, 56 Rose Street And 23 Buccleuch Street			55°52′02″N 4°15′39″W		B	33119	Upload Photo
1-20 (Inclusive Nos) Royal Terrace, 11B-19 (Odd Nos) North Claremont Street And 66 Kelvingrove Street			55°51′59″N 4°16′52″W		B	33121	Upload Photo
34, 36 St Enoch Square			55°51′27″N 4°15′22″W		B	33124	Upload Photo
120, Elmbank Street With 71-83 (Odd Nos) Holland Street And Lodges, 59, 61 Holland Street, Gates And Retaining Walls			55°51′52″N 4°16′04″W		A	33022	Upload Photo
97-113B (Odd Nos) Hill Street, Breadalbane Terrace			55°52′01″N 4°15′56″W		A	33038	Upload Photo
114 Hill Street, Bilsland House			55°52′03″N 4°16′00″W		C(S)	33045	Upload Photo
157-167 (Odd Nos) Hope Street And 169-175 (Odd Nos) West George Street			55°51′44″N 4°15′31″W		A	33053	Upload another image
217-225 (Odd Nos) Hope Street			55°51′49″N 4°15′28″W		C(S)	33054	Upload Photo
Jamaica Street, Glasgow Bridge			55°51′20″N 4°15′28″W		B	33062	Upload another image See more images
18-22 (Even Nos) Jamaica Street			55°51′29″N 4°15′27″W		B	33063	Upload Photo
66-72 (Even Nos) James Watt Street (Known As 72 James Watt Street)			55°51′30″N 4°15′50″W		A	33070	Upload Photo
182-200 (Even Nos) Bath Street Also Known As Athol Place			55°51′53″N 4°15′45″W		B	32967	Upload Photo
264, 266 Bath Street And 150-160 (Even Nos) Elmbank Street And Sauchiehall Lane, Including The Griffin Public House			55°51′56″N 4°16′05″W		B	32971	Upload another image See more images
14-20A (Inclusive Nos) Blythswood Square And 108 Douglas Street			55°51′47″N 4°15′50″W		B	32977	Upload Photo
30 Bothwell Street And 100 Wellington Street			55°51′41″N 4°15′35″W		B	32984	Upload Photo
36-44 (Even Nos) Bothwell Street 87, 89 Wellington Street			55°51′41″N 4°15′38″W		B	32985	Upload another image
54-62 (Even Nos) Bothwell Street			55°51′41″N 4°15′41″W		B	32987	Upload Photo
91-99 (Odd Nos) Buccleuch Street, 72, 74 Garnet Street And 41, 43 Garnethill Street, Former High School For Girls			55°52′04″N 4°16′00″W		B	32989	Upload another image

== Key ==
The scheme for classifying buildings in Scotland is:

- Category A: "buildings of national or international importance, either architectural or historic; or fine, little-altered examples of some particular period, style or building type."
- Category B: "buildings of regional or more than local importance; or major examples of some particular period, style or building type, which may have been altered."
- Category C: "buildings of local importance; lesser examples of any period, style, or building type, as originally constructed or moderately altered; and simple traditional buildings which group well with other listed buildings."

In March 2016 there were 47,288 listed buildings in Scotland. Of these, 8% were Category A, and 50% were Category B, with the remaining 42% being Category C.

== See also ==
- List of listed buildings in Glasgow
