= 1990s (band) =

Scottish indie rock band

- Origin: Glasgow, Scotland
- Genres: Indie rock, garage rock, power pop
- Years active: 2004–present
- Labels: Rough Trade
- Members: Jackie McKeown; Michael McGaughrin; Dino Bardot
- Past members: Jamie McMorrow

1990s are an indie rock three-piece band from Glasgow, Scotland.

== History ==
They were signed to Rough Trade Record Company (home of many notable acts such as The Strokes and The Smiths) when they were spotted at only their sixth gig (a first for Rough Trade) and released two albums, Cookies and Kicks. Lead singer Jackie (aka John) McKeown and bassist, Jamie McMorrow, were the founding members of Scottish indie band The Yummy Fur. The line-up over the years that The Yummy Fur existed changed on numerous occasions. At one point, both Franz Ferdinand singer Alex Kapranos and drummer Paul Thomson were members of the group. 1990s' drummer Michael McGaughrin and bassist Dino Bardot were also in Glasgow band V-Twin, signed to Domino Records, before 1990s were formed.

1990s "You Made Me Like It" (2006)
Sample of 1990s – "You Made Me Like It".

1990s had supported Babyshambles at the Glasgow Barrowlands, and Franz Ferdinand at the SECC and Aberdeen Exhibition and Conference Centre, as well as releasing their debut single, "You Made Me Like It/Arcade Precinct" on limited edition vinyl. They played at the Indian Summer festival at Victoria Park in Glasgow on 2 September 2006, alongside bands such as Yeah Yeah Yeahs, The Fall and Antony and the Johnsons and also Bestival on the Isle of Wight. 1990s went on tour in October 2006 with The Long Blondes, and with CSS in November. According to the band, they play music "like a blonde gets out of a car".

On the official website it was revealed Jamie McMorrow left the band on 5 September 2007. He was replaced by Norman Blake of Teenage Fanclub on the 2007 European tour. Dino Bardot of Stinky Munchkins (also formerly of V-Twin alongside Michael McGaughrin), played the bass on the Australian and North American shows in late 2007, and was confirmed as a new member of the band on their MySpace page early in 2008.

The band's second album, Kicks, was produced by Bernard Butler and was released on 23 March 2009. This twelve-track sophomore effort included the glam-stomp of "The Box", "Everybody Please Relax" and the single "59" (the video of which was shot on the number 59 bus around Glasgow). It boasted a beefier, harmony-driven sound, whilst maintaining the band's trademark style and wit. Kicks also featured a guest turn from former The Long Blondes singer Kate Jackson, who lent backing vocals to the track "Kickstrasse". NME wrote that "like Supergrass and British Sea Power before them, 1990s' refusal to be difficult and consistent greatness makes them a hard concept to market. But a fantastic one to listen to." The song "You Made Me Like It" can be heard in the pilot for Community. In 2022 the band reformed and began playing live shows for the first time in 10 years. They also released a new album, Nude Restaurant, which was recorded in 2011 and released on Last Night in Glasgow records on 24 June 2022.

== Releases ==
=== Discography ===
- Cookies (2007)
- Kicks (2009)
- Nude Restaurant (2022)

=== Singles ===
- "You Made Me Like It" (2006)
- "You're Supposed to Be My Friend" (2006) UK No. 86
- "See You at the Lights" (2007)
- "My Baby's Double Espresso" (2022)
