= Comet Gain =

British indie pop band

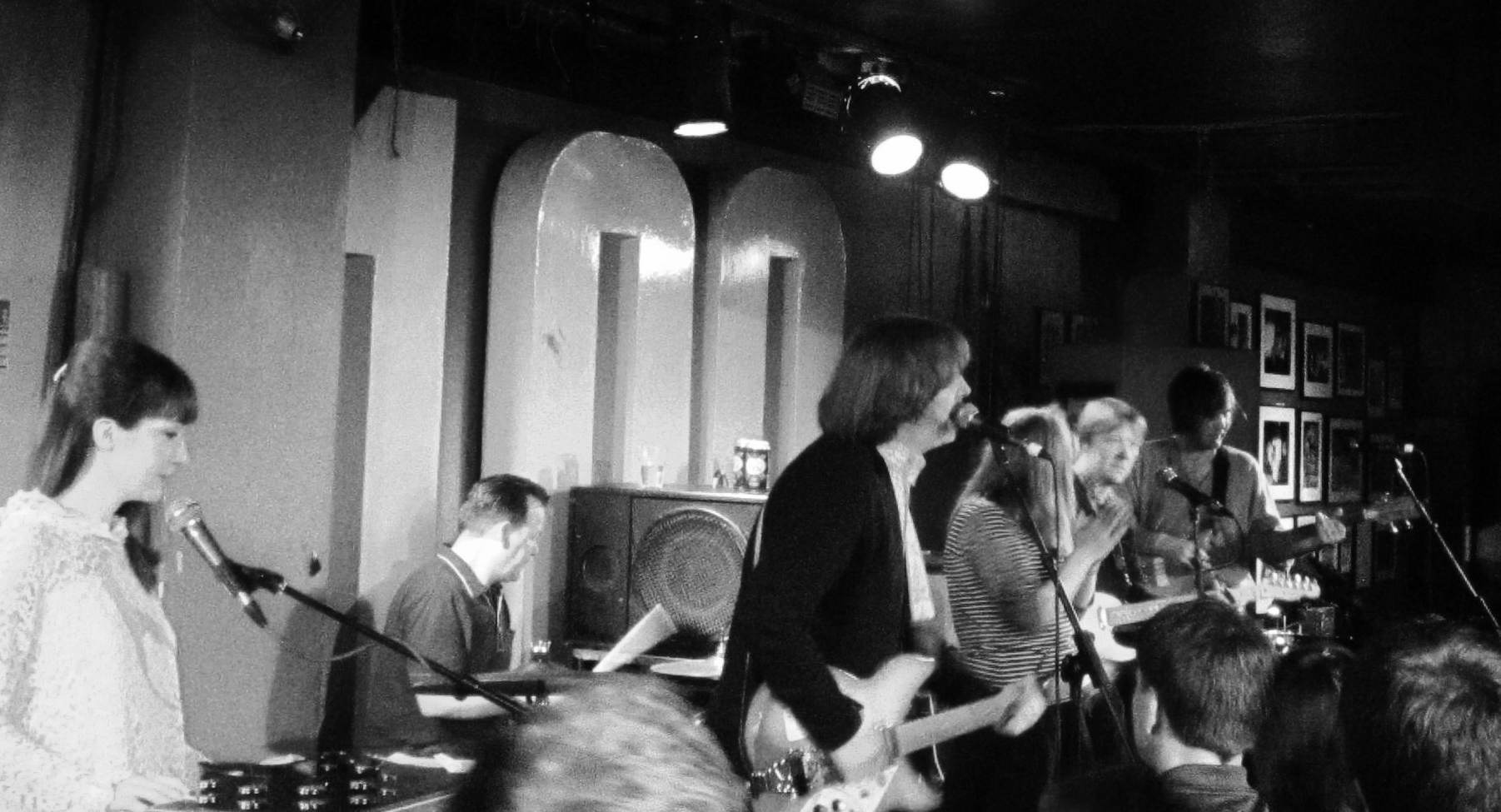
- Comet Gain at 'London Popfest', 100 Club in 2012

Background information
- Origin: London, England
- Genres: Indie pop
- Years active: 1992–present
- Labels: Wiiija; Kill Rock Stars; Fortuna Pop!; What's Your Rupture?; The Track & Field Organisation; Milou Studios
- Members: David Feck; Rachel Evans; M.J. "Woodie" Taylor; Anne Laure Guillain; Ben Phillipson; James Hornsey
- Past members: Phil Sutton; Sarah Bleach; Sam Pluck; Jax Coombes; Jon Slade; Kaoru Ishikawa; Darren Smyth; Blair Cowl; George Wright

Comet Gain are a British indie pop band, formed by singer-songwriter and guitarist David Christian (aka David Feck/Charlie Damage) in 1992, with musical influences including post-punk and northern soul. Pitchfork called them "one of the most underrated contemporary indie bands in the UK".

== History ==
=== Comet Gain Mk 1: 1992-1997 ===
Comet Gain was formed in Oxford in 1992 by Christian with Phil Sutton; the band initially recorded and released homemade demos on cassette and made their live debut with short-lived bassist George Wright, before later adding vocalist Sarah Bleach to the line-up, with Jax Coombes on bass and Sam Pluck on guitar. Comet Gain's first vinyl release was two tracks on Wiiija double-7-inch EP Some Hearts Paid To Lie in 1993, alongside three riot grrrl bands, and early gigs included supports with Bikini Kill, Heavenly, Linus, etc. Following the Holloway Sweethearts EP on Soul Static Sound in 1994, Comet Gain signed with Wiiija and released debut album Casino Classics and second EP Gettin' Ready in 1995. The album featured sleevenotes by Television Personalities frontman Dan Treacy. During this period Comet Gain's music varied in style from indie-pop influenced by soul and sixties girl-group sounds, through early-80s alternative pop, to punk, with lead vocals and songwriting split between Christian, and Bleach et al.

1996's Say Yes To International Socialism EP was promoted by Comet Gain's debut promo video, for its more radio-friendly b-side "Hideaway". A second video was produced the following year to promote the "Strength" single, included on the following mini-album, Magnetic Poetry, which was also released (as Sneaky) on Beggars Banquet USA to promote the band stateside. However, due to ongoing artistic differences, in early 1997 Comet Gain had already disbanded, the majority forming the band Velocette, remaining on Wiiija, leaving Christian to continue Comet Gain with new members. A planned follow-up single was abandoned and re-recorded for the first Velocette release, while other Bleach-et-al material from the planned second Comet Gain album remains unreleased.

=== Comet Gain Mk 2: 1997–2014 ===
Joined by new vocalist Rachel Evans, alongside bassist/keyboardist Kay Ishikawa, bassist/guitarist Blair Cowl and Darren Smyth on drums, Comet Gain recorded a second Peel Session in late 1997 and released third album Tigertown Pictures in 1999, following a move to KRS records. Additional members on the record included John McKeown (The Yummy Fur) and songs included the signature "Saturday Night Facts Of Life", later covered by The Cribs.

2002's Realistes, saw Comet Gain augmented by guitarist Jon Slade (ex-Huggy Bear) and drummer Woodie Taylor (ex-Morrissey/The Meteors) and continued the garage-punk influenced direction of the previous album. Guests included Chris Appelgren (The PeeChees) and Kathleen Hanna (Bikini Kill).

2005's City Fallen Leaves was released on Track and Field records, and showcased a more expansive production, to further critical acclaim. Songs included "Fists In The Pocket" which had a rare accompanying video. The follow-up release, Broken Record Prayers, compiled singles, Peel Sessions and unreleased tracks from 1998 to 2008.

2010 and 2011 saw the release of a series of limited-edition singles to support next album Howl of the Lonely Crowd (Fortuna Pop! records). Produced by Ryan Jarman and Edwyn Collins, the album cemented Comet Gain's reputation as respected and influential indie-pop veterans. During this period, Comet Gain settled as a 7-piece band with the addition of Ben Phillipson (ex-Kicker, Eighteenth Day of May) on guitar and backing vocals and Anne Laure Guillain on keyboards and backing vocals.

Members of Comet Gain collaborated with members of tourmates Crystal Stilts and others as Cinema Red and Blue, a long-term side project which released a single and an eponymous album in 2010. A follow-up EP was released in October 2011.

=== Comet Gain Mk 3: 2014–present ===
In 2014 an amended Comet Gain line-up, with James Hornsey of The Clientele replacing both Ishikawa and Slade as full-time bassist, released seventh album Paperback Ghosts. Noted for an emphasis on ballads and orchestration, the record received universally positive reviews.

In 2017, M'Ladys Records released new editions of Réalistes and City Fallen Leaves on vinyl. Cinema Red and Blue released a new single the same year, and a covers EP followed in 2021. In August 2018 the Fortuna Pop! label released its final single, an all-star cover of a 2001 7-inch, Comet Gain's "You Can Hide Your Love Forever".

In October 2018 Comet Gain released their first material with new label Tapete Records, two-track single "If Not Tomorrow"/"I Was More of a Mess Then". In August 2019 the band announced their 8th album Fireraisers Forever!, to be released 11 October. According to Allmusic, the "furious and heartbreaking" album "combines Christian's politically charged lyrics with the band's inspired take on modern punk rock...and is just as inspired, angry, and devoted to pop as their early recordings." Louder Than War called it "essential listening".

Since 2021, Christian has released a large amount of Comet Gain's archival/demo recordings via the band's Bandcamp page (along with a variety of solo recordings as well). A "best-of" these releases was compiled and released as The Misfit Jukebox in 2023. In addition, the various recordings for radio the band had done over their existence was released as Radio Sessions (BBC 1996-2011) in 2024.

== Line-up ==
=== Current ===
- David Feck [aka David Christian] (vocals, guitar)
- Rachel Evans (vocals, percussion)
- M.J."Woodie" Taylor (drums, production)
- Anne Laure Guillain (keys, backing vocals, percussion)
- Ben Phillipson (guitar, vocals)
- James Hornsey (bass)

=== 1993–1997 ===
- David Charlie Feck [aka Charlie Damage] (vocals, guitar, keys)
- Sarah Bleach (vocals)
- Sam Pluck (guitar)
- Jax Coombes (bass, keyboards)
- Phil Sutton [aka Hoffner Burns] (drums)

=== Additional members ===
- Kaoru Ishikawa (bass) (1997–2012)
- Jon Slade (guitar, bass) (1997–2012 and later guest appearances)
- Darren Smyth (drums) (1997–2001)
- Blair Cowl (guitar, bass) (1997–1999)
- Lorna Lithgow (keys) (1999)
- John McKeown (guitar) (1999 and later guest appearances)
- Erik Brunulf (guitar, bass) (2001)
- George Wright (bass) (1992)
- Chris Appelgren (drums) (2002)
- Gary Jarman (live drums – one gig) (2008)
- Steve Dore (drums-newspapers-spiritual advice) (1992–present)

== Discography ==
=== Albums ===
- Casino Classics (CD & LP/ 1995/ Wiiija)
- Magnetic Poetry (CD & LP/ 1997/ Wiiija) / "Sneaky" (CD & LP / 1997 / Beggars Banquet USA)
- Tigertown Pictures (CD & LP+7"/ 1998/ Fortuna Pop! / Kill Rock Stars)
- Réalistes (CD & LP/ 2002/ Milou Studios / Kill Rock Stars)
- City Fallen Leaves (CD & LP/ 2005/ The Track & Field Organisation / Kill Rock Stars)
- Howl of the Lonely Crowd (CD & LP/ 2011/ Fortuna Pop! / What's Your Rupture?)
- Paperback Ghosts (CD & LP/ 2014/ Fortuna Pop!)
- Fireraisers Forever! (CD & LP/ 2019/ Tapete Records)
- Wild Spring Poems (DL/ 2024)
- Return to Tigertown (DL/ 2024)
- Wintertime Ghosts (DL/ 2024)
- Letters to Ordinary Outsiders (CD & LP & DL/ 2025/ Tapete Records)

=== Compilations ===
- Broken Record Prayers (CD & LP/ 2008/ Milou Studios/ What's Your Rupture?)
- Comet Gain (EP) (DL/ 2021/ Tapete Records)
- Winter Fingers (EP) (DL/2021)
- The Misfit Jukebox Vol. 1: Somewhere to Belong (DL/ 2022)
- The Misfit Jukebox Vol. 2: Paintbox Aliens (DL/ 2022)
- We Lived Our Lives Like This (EP) (DL/ 2022)
- The Misfit Jukebox Vol. 3: Museum of Snarling Flowers (DL/ 2022)
- Mess Music for Bruised Hearts (DL/ 2023)
- The Misfit Jukebox (CD & LP & DL/ 2023/ Tapete Records)
- Radio Sessions (BBC 1996-2011) (CD & LP & DL/ 2024/ Tapete Records)

=== Singles and EPs ===
- Some Hearts Paid to Lie (2× 7-inch/ 1993/ Wiiija) [joint release with Linus / Pussycat Trash / Skinned Teen]
- Holloway Sweethearts EP (7-inch/ 1994/ Soul Static Sound)
- "Million and Nine" (one sided 7-inch/ 1995/ Wiiija)
- The Gettin' Ready EP (7-inch & CD/ Oct. 1995/ Wiiija)
- Say Yes! (To International Socialism) EP (7-inch & CD/ Apr. 1996/ Wiiija)
- "Strength" (7-inch & CD/ Feb. 1997/ Wiiija)
- "Jack Nance Hair" (7-inch/ 1998/ Mei Mei Records)
- "Mailorder Freaks Singles Club" [If I Had a Soul, He Walked By Night, Brothers Off the Block] (7-inc / Sept. 1998/ Kill Rock Stars)
- Red Menace EP (7-inch/ 1999/ Piao! Records)
- "You Can Hide Your Love Forever" (7-inch/ 2001/ Fortuna Pop!)
- "Beautiful Despair" (12-inch/ Jul. 2006/ What's Your Rupture?)
- "Love Without Lies" (7-inch/ Oct. 2008/ Twee as Fuck / What's Your Rupture?)
- "Herbert Hunke Pt 1" (7-inch/ Feb. 2009/ Germs of Youth)
- "The Weekend Dreams" (7-inch split with Hello Cuca/ May 2010/ Doble Vida Discos)
- I Never Happened EP (7-inch/ 2010/ What's Your Rupture?)
- "Working Circle Explosive" (split 7-inch w/Crystal Stilts/ 2011/ Fortuna Pop!)
- "An Arcade from the Warm Rain That Falls" [7-inch/ 2011/ Fortuna Pop!]
- "Avenue Girls" (7-inch/ 2013/ WIAIWYA)
- "Sad Love and Other Short Stories" (7-inch/ 2014/ Fortuna Pop!)
- Fingerprint Ritual EP (12-inch & CD/ 2015/ Fortuna Pop!)
- "If Not Tomorrow"/"I Was More of a Mess Then" (7-inch & DD/ 2018/ Tapete Records)
- I Hate Christmas Records EP (DL/ 2023)
- "Only Happy When I'm Sad"/"Dreams of a Working Girl" (7-inch & DD/ 2024/ Tapete Records)
- Halloweenage Kicks EP (DL/ 2024)

=== Selected compilation appearances ===
- "You’ve Been Gone Too Long" (live) on Heartache fanzine tape (CS/ 1995/ Heartache fanzine)
- "Like a Sparrow" on Godz Is Not a Put-On (Godz tribute) (LP w/7"/ 1996/ Lissy's Records)
- "Dreams of a Working Girl" on NME C96 (CD/ 1996/ NME)
- "Baby's Alright" on Generation X - The Definitive Sound of 90's Indie (CD/ 1996/ Generation X Music)
- "Pinstriped Rebel" (Would Be Goods cover) on All Done with Mirrors (CD/ 1998/ Le Grand Magistery)
- "Asleep on the Snow" on A Christmas Gift from Fortuna Pop! (CDEP/ 2000/ Fortuna Pop!)
- "I Close My Eyes to Think of God" on Jackson's Jukebox (CD/ 2000/ Kill Rock Stars)
- "Look at You Now, You're Crying" on Fields and Streams (2xCD/ 2002/ Kill Rock Stars)
- "Ann Don't Cry" on Everything Is Ending Here: (A Tribute to Pavement) (2xCD/ 2003/ Homesleep Records)
- "Look at You Now, You're Crying" on POW! to the People (2xCD/ 2003/ The Track & Field Organisation)
- "If You Ever Walk Out of My Life" (Dena Barnes cover) on More Soul Than Wigan Casino (7-inch/ 2005/ Fortuna Pop!)
- "Beautiful Despair", "Never Die" and "Mainlining Mystery" on Imagine the Shapes (CD/ 2007/ What's Your Rupture?)
- "You Can Hide Your Love Forever" on Be True to Your School - A Fortuna Pop! Compilation (CD & DL/ 2008/ Fortuna POP!)
- "Why I Try to Look So Bad" on 20 Years of Kill Rock Stars (CD/ 2011/ Kill Rock Stars)
