= Always Ascending =

Studio album by Franz Ferdinand
- Released: 9 February 2018
- Recorded: 15 December 2015 - December 31, 2017
- Studios: Motorbass (Paris); RAK (London)
- Genres: Indie rock; dance-punk; new wave
- Length: 39:48
- Label: Domino
- Producer: Philippe Zdar

Franz Ferdinand chronology
FFS (2015)	Always Ascending (2018)	Hits to the Head (2022)

Singles from Always Ascending
- 1. "Always Ascending" Released: 25 October 2017; 2. "Feel the Love Go" Released: 8 January 2018; 3. "Lazy Boy" Released: 25 January 2018; 4. "Glimpse of Love" Released: 25 March 2018

Always Ascending is the fifth studio album by Scottish indie rock band Franz Ferdinand. It was released on 9 February 2018 through the Domino Recording Company. It is the band's first non-collaborative album in over four years, following Right Thoughts, Right Words, Right Action (2013). It is also their first album to feature new member Julian Corrie, who joined shortly after the departure of Nick McCarthy, and their last to feature drummer Paul Thomson. The album received generally positive reviews from critics. It peaked at number three in Scotland and number six in the UK. Four singles were released from the album: "Always Ascending", "Feel the Love Go", "Lazy Boy" and an alternative version of "Glimpse of Love". Several tracks from the album are featured during scenes or the closing credits of various episodes of the television show Loudermilk.

== Background and recording ==
Following the release of Right Thoughts, Right Words, Right Action, the band's fourth studio album, in August 2013, the band collaborated with American rock band Sparks under the name FFS. They released a self-titled album in July 2015 and briefly toured. in December 2015 the group begin recording the album last till end of 2017 In July 2016, it was announced that Nick McCarthy, one of the band's founding members, was taking a break from the band to spend more time with family and focusing on side projects. It was announced in May 2017 that two new members had joined the band; Dino Bardot, former guitarist for Scottish indie rock band 1990s, and music producer Julian Corrie. Corrie joined the band for the recording sessions of the album, while Bardot joined after recording was completed.

The band recorded the album at Motorbass Studios in Paris and RAK Studios in London. They previously used RAK Studios to record FFS in late 2014. For Always Ascending, they worked alongside Philippe Zdar, one-half of French synthpop duo Cassius and frequent collaborator with French indie pop band Phoenix, on the album.

== Composition ==
The music of Always Ascending has been described as indie rock, dance-punk, and new wave, all genres that the band have been previously associated with.

== Promotion and release ==
Prior to the announcement of the album, the band shared a short snippet of the title track on social media platforms on 23 October 2017. On 25 October, the band released the title track as the album's lead single. Alongside the release was the reveal of the album's title, artwork, and track listing. They also released dates for a world tour, starting in October 2017 and ending in May 2018. A music video for the title track, directed by AB/CD/CD, was released on 4 December. On 8 January 2018, "Feel the Love Go" was premiered on Zane Lowe's radio show on Beats 1. A music video was also released on the same day and made exclusive to the Apple Music service. The video was directed by Diane Martel, who had previously directed the band's music videos for "Do You Want To" and "Evil Eye". On 25 January, "Lazy Boy" was released as a single.

The album was released on physical and digital formats on 9 February 2018 by the Domino Recording Company. It was made available on 12" vinyl, CD, and a limited edition cassette. A bundle was also made available which included a 180 gram blue and white marble-colored vinyl and other special merchandise items, limited to 1,500 copies. The Japanese CD edition of the album was released through Hostess Entertainment and featured the band's non-album single "Demagogue" (2016) from 30 Days, 30 Songs as a bonus track.

== Critical reception ==
Professional ratings
Aggregate scores
Source	Rating
AnyDecentMusic?	6.7/10
Metacritic	72/100
Review scores
Source	Rating
AllMusic	3/5 stars
The A.V. Club	B−
The Guardian	3/5 stars
The Independent	3/5 stars
Mojo	4/5 stars
NME	4/5 stars
Pitchfork	6.9/10
Rolling Stone	3.5/5 stars
Slant Magazine	3.5/5 stars
Under the Radar	8/10 stars

Always Ascending received generally positive reviews from critics. On review aggregator site Metacritic, the album holds an average critic score of 72/100, based on 26 reviews. At the online review aggregator AnyDecentMusic?, the album received an average critic score of 6.7/10, based on 31 reviews.

== Track listing ==
All tracks are written by Julian Corrie, Bob Hardy, Alex Kapranos, and Paul Thomson.

Always Ascending
No.	Title	Length
1.	"Always Ascending"	5:21
2.	"Lazy Boy"	2:59
3.	"Paper Cages"	3:40
4.	"Finally"	3:09
5.	"The Academy Award"	4:14
6.	"Lois Lane"	3:34
7.	"Huck and Jim"	3:35
8.	"Glimpse of Love"	3:12
9.	"Feel the Love Go"	4:46
10.	"Slow Don't Kill Me Slow"	5:18
Total length:		39:48

Japanese CD edition bonus track
No.	Title	Length
11.	"Demagogue"	2:38
Total length:		42:40

== Personnel ==
All personnel adapted from liner notes.

Franz Ferdinand

- Alex Kapranos
- Bob Hardy
- Paul Thomson
- Julian Corrie

Additional musicians

- Terry Edwards – saxophone (track 9)

Technical personnel

- Mike Horner – additional production
- Pierre Juarez – additional production
- Mike Marsh – mastering
- Sam Potter – extra contribution (tracks 1, 3)
- Antoine Poyeton – assistant at Motorbass Studios
- Will Purton – assistant at RAK Studios
- Philippe Zdar – production, mixing

Other personnel

- Melissa Appleton – Infinity Mirror construction
- Edwin Burdis – coordination
- Matthew Cooper – design
- Sylvan Deleu – photography
- David Edwards – band collage photos
- Franz Ferdinand – design
- Alexis Anne Mackenzie – cover art, band collages

== Charts ==
Chart (2018)	Peak position
Australian Albums (ARIA)	28
Austrian Albums (Ö3 Austria)	16
Belgian Albums (Ultratop Flanders)	21
Belgian Albums (Ultratop Wallonia)	13
Canadian Albums (Billboard)	31
Croatian International Albums (HDU)	6
Czech Albums (ČNS IFPI)	30
Dutch Albums (Album Top 100)	19
French Albums (SNEP)	14
German Albums (Offizielle Top 100)	13
Greek Albums (IFPI Greece)	57
Irish Albums (Official Charts)	35
Italian Albums (FIMI)	31
Japan Hot Albums (Billboard Japan)	35
Japanese Albums (Oricon)	26
New Zealand Heatseeker Albums (RMNZ)	2
Portuguese Albums (AFP)	14
Scottish Albums (Official Charts)	3
Spanish Albums (PROMUSICAE)	20
Swiss Albums (Schweizer Hitparade)	5
UK Albums (Official Charts)	6
UK Independent Albums (Official Charts)	2
US Billboard 200	59
US Independent Albums (Billboard)	1
US Top Alternative Albums (Billboard)	5
US Top Rock Albums (Billboard)	5

== Release history ==
Region	Date	Format	Label	Catalog no.	Ref.
Various	9 February 2018	CD	Domino	WIGCD408	
Various	9 February 2018	12" vinyl	Domino	WIGLP408	
Various	9 February 2018	12" vinyl (deluxe edition)	Domino	WIGLP408X	
Various	9 February 2018	12" vinyl (bundle edition)	Domino	WIGLP408XXMT	
Various	9 February 2018	Cassette	Domino	WIGMC408	
Various	9 February 2018	Download; streaming	Domino	WIG408D	
Japan	9 February 2018	CD	Hostess	HSE-1290	
