= The Yummy Fur =

Scottish indie rock band

- Origin: Glasgow, Scotland
- Genres: Indie rock; art punk
- Years active: 1992–1999; 2010; 2026–present
- Labels: Vesuvius; Guided Missile; Upset the Rhythm
- Members: John McKeown; Paul Thomson; Brian MacDougall
- Past members: Alex Kapranos; Dino Bardot; Lawrence Worthington; Mark Gibbons (deceased); Clare Gorman; Jamie McMorrow; Mark Leighton; Marcus McNichol; Steve Dunbar; Alec Prentice; Charlie Milne; Paul Guided Missile

See also Yummy Fur (comic) by Chester Brown..

The Yummy Fur are a Scottish indie rock band from Glasgow, formed in 1992. The band is fronted by lead singer and guitarist John McKeown, joined by a regularly changing line-up of other musicians. McKeown has since gone on to form the band 1990s. Their name was taken from the comic book Yummy Fur by Chester Brown.

After leaving the band in 1997, Lawrence Worthington would drum for both The Male Nurse and The Fall-influenced art punk band Country Teasers.

Three future members of internationally successful Glasgow indie band Franz Ferdinand played in The Yummy Fur. Drummer Paul Thomson who joined the band in 1997, and multi-instrumentalist Alex Kapranos Huntley, who joined in 1998, were founder members of Franz Ferdinand, and Dino Bardot would join Franz Ferdinand as guitarist in 2017 to replace Nick McCarthy.

Keyboard player Mark Gibbons died by suicide in 1999.

The band were lauded by BBC Radio 1 DJ John Peel, recording two Peel Sessions in 1995 and 1998.

On 23 November 2009, it was announced that McKeown and Thomson would reunite The Yummy Fur for a brief tour of the United States in January 2010 with Bishop Allen to support a greatest hits compilation due in late January. A further report from NME confirmed the involvement of long-time Yummy Fur guitarist Brian MacDougall.

== Discography ==
=== Albums ===
- Night Club (Slampt LP/Guided Missile CD, 1996)
- Sexy World (Guided Missile CD/LP, 1998)
- Everybody Talks About the Weather (Upset The Rhythm, 2026)

=== Mini albums ===
- Male Shadow at Three O'Clock (Vesuvius Records CD/10", 1998)

=== Compilation albums ===
- Kinky Cinema (Guided Missile CD, 1997)
- Piggy Wings (Rock Action Records LP/CD, 2019)

"Dead Weather" {Monorail Music} 20 track outtakes and demo compilation released with initial copies of "Everybody Talks About the Weather."

=== Split albums ===
- Prole Life : A Souvenir From Glasgow - tracks 1 to 7 (Cherry Red Records, CD, 1995)

=== Singles and EPs ===
- "Music by Walt Disney but Played by Yuri Gagarin Thus a Political Record" (Slampt 7", 1995)
- "Kodak Nancy Europe EP" (Guided Missile 7", 1995)
- "Plastic Cowboy" (Guided Missile 7", 1996)
- "Supermarket" (Vesuvius 7", 1996)
- "Policeman" (Guided Missile 7", 1996)
- "Stereo Girls" (Roxy 7", 1997)
- "Shoot the Ridiculant" (Guided Missile 7", 1998)

=== Cassettes (demo) ===
- "The Edith Massey Eggsplosion" (not on label, 1994)
