= Govan Town Hall =

Municipal building in Govan, Scotland

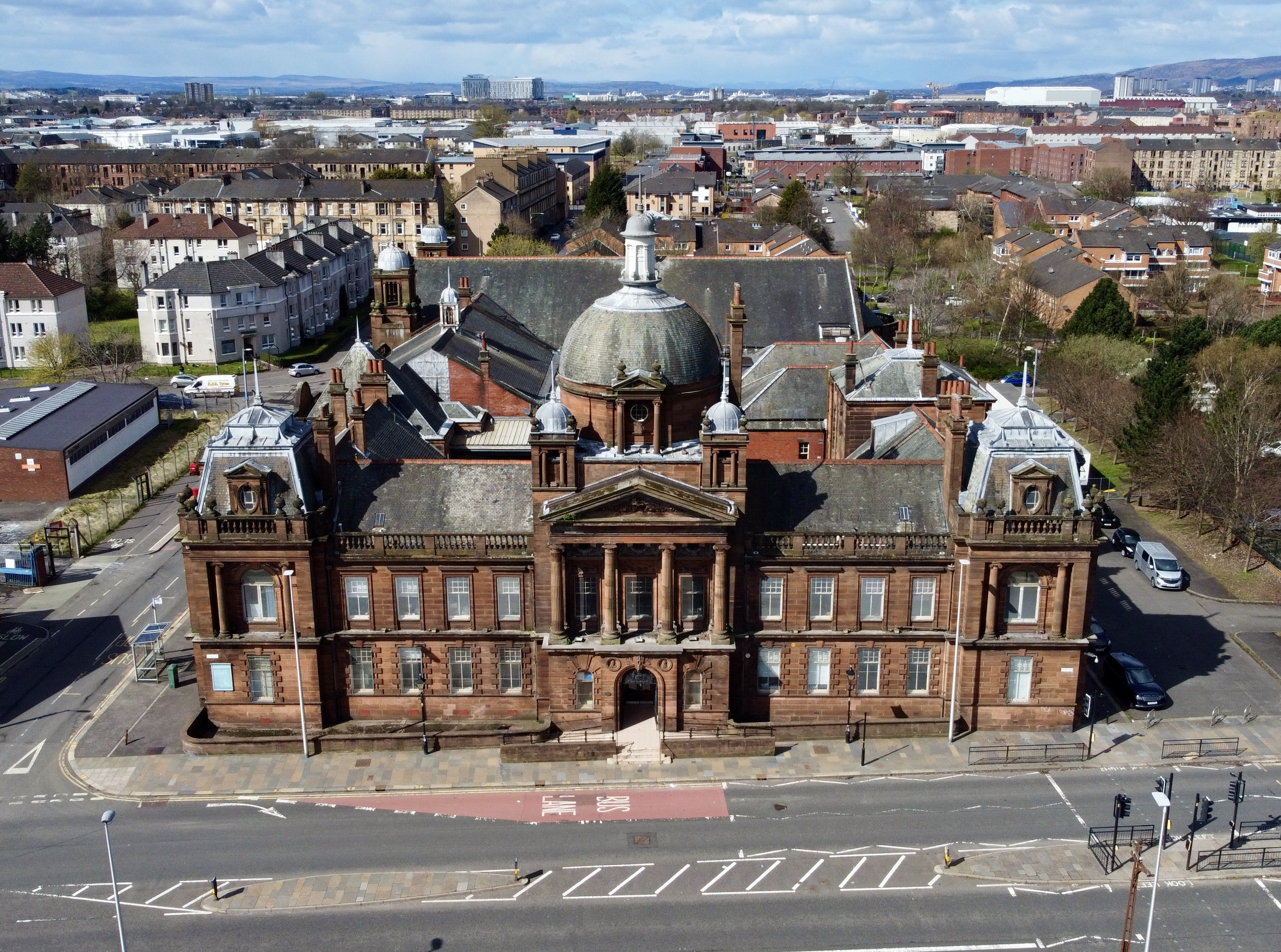
- Govan Town Hall

- Shown in Glasgow
- 55.8566°N 4.3004°W
- Location: Govan Road, Govan

History
- Built: 1901

Site notes
- Architect(s): Thomson and Sandilands
- Architectural style: Beaux-Arts style

Listed Building – Category B
- Designated: 15 December 1970
- Reference no.: LB33340

Govan Town Hall is a former municipal facility on Govan Road, Govan, Scotland. The town hall, which was the headquarters of Govan Burgh Council, is a Category B listed building.

== History ==
The building was commissioned to replace the Govan Municipal Buildings in Orkney Street which were completed in 1867. After rapid industrial expansion and population growth in the local area, civic leaders found this arrangement was inadequate and they decided to procure a purpose-built town hall: the site they selected was open land at the corner of Summertown Road and Govan Road.

The foundation stone for the new building was laid in September 1898. It was designed by Thomson & Sandilands in the Beaux-Arts style, built at a cost of £60,000 and officially opened by the Provost of Govan, James Kirkwood, in October 1901. The design involved a symmetrical frontage with thirteen bays along Govan Road with the end bays projecting forward; the central section of three bays featured an arched doorway on the ground floor; there were three windows behind a tetrastyle Ionic order portico on the first floor and a large pediment containing a carved tympanum above. At roof level there was a large dome with a colonnaded cupola on top. There were several portrait busts, designed by Archibald Macfarlane Shannan, placed on the Govan Road elevation of the building. Internally, the principal rooms were a council chamber in the eastern section of the building, together with a large public hall with a grand organ and a smaller "upper hall", both in the western section. The grand organ was designed and manufactured by Norman and Beard and had four manuals.

The town hall was the headquarters of Govan Burgh Council until Glasgow annexed Govan, after a series of anti-amalgamation demonstrations, in 1912. The building was subsequently used by the social services department of Glasgow Corporation: the ornate decoration in the two halls in the western section, including a magnificent proscenium arch inside the public hall, which had also been designed by Shannon, was completely destroyed during a refurbishment of the building in 1973.

In the early 2000s, Gillian Berrie, a film producer, secured access to the building and raised £3.5 million to convert it into a film production facility known as Film City Glasgow. The works involved refurbishment of the upper hall, installation of a Dolby theatre and upgrading the eastern section (i.e. front) of the building for use by creative media businesses.

== See also ==
- List of listed buildings in Glasgow/6
