= Tigertown Pictures =

Studio album by Comet Gain
- Released: 28 September 1999
- Genre: Indie pop
- Length: 54:00
- Label: (United States) Kill Rock Stars (United Kingdom) Where It's At

Comet Gain chronology
Magnetic Poetry (1997)	Tigertown Pictures (1999)	Réalistes (2002)

Professional ratings
Review scores
Source	Rating
AllMusic	3/5 stars
The Encyclopedia of Popular Music	3/5 stars
Pitchfork Media	4.8/10

Tigertown Pictures is an album by British indie pop band Comet Gain. It followed a change of record label to Kill Rock Stars and introduced a new band line-up, with the exception of frontman/songwriter David Christian.

== Critical reception ==
CMJ wrote: "Boy/girl lead vocals, astoundingly rough time changes and drunken yet still meaningful lyrics make this effort another interesting episode in this band's soap-operatic career." The Detroit Metro Times wrote: "With tear/beer-stained sentiments and boy-girl vocals, this U.K. gang of four’s art-punky rickety rack explores why our most cherished music turns on us when relationships fail."

== Track listing ==
No.	Title	Length
1.	"Record Collection"	4:23
2.	"Skinny Wolves"	3:16
3.	"Jack Nance Rising"	5:07
4.	"Deficient Love"	1:41
5.	"Germ of Youth/Ghosts of Sulphate"	2:05
6.	"Radar"	2:27
7.	"Transmission Lost"	4:43
8.	"Hate Soul"	3:27
9.	"When You Come Back I'll Feel Like Jesus Coming Off The Cross"	4:32
10.	"Dreaming Of Tigertown"	7:20
11.	"Saturday Night Facts Of Life"	2:01
12.	"Ballad Of The Arms Of Cable Hogue"	3:24
13.	"Jasper Johns"	4:18
14.	"The Final Anesthetic"	5:16

== Personnel ==
- David Christian - guitar, vocals
- Kay Ishikawa - bass
- Darren Smyth - drums
- Rachel Evans - vocals
