= Broken Record Prayers =

Compilation album by Comet Gain
- Released: 28 October 2008
- Genre: Indie pop
- Label: Milou; What's Your Rupture?

Comet Gain chronology
| City Fallen Leaves (2005) | Broken Record Prayers (2008) | Howl of the Lonely Crowd (2011) |

Professional ratings
Review scores
| Source | Rating |
|---|---|
| AllMusic | 4/5 stars |
| Pitchfork Media | (8.2/10) |
| The Skinny | 3/5 stars |

Broken Record Prayers is a compilation album by British indie pop band Comet Gain. It was released in the UK on 28 October 2008 through M.J. "Woodie" Taylor's own label, Milou Studios.

== Track listing ==
All songs written by David Feck except where noted.

| No. | Title | Writer(s) | Length |
|---|---|---|---|
| 1. | "Jack Nance Hair" | | 3:57 |
| 2. | "You Can Hide Your Love Forever" | | 3:48 |
| 3. | "Young Lions" | | 1:57 |
| 4. | "If I Had a Soul" | | 3:17 |
| 5. | "Brothers Off the Block" | | 5:18 |
| 6. | "Beautiful Despair" | | 3:56 |
| 7. | "Love Without Lies" | | 2:58 |
| 8. | "Hard Times" | Curtis Mayfield | 3:38 |
| 9. | "If You Ever Walk out of My Life" | Dena Barnes, Duke Browner | 2:48 |
| 10. | "Books of California" | | 3:13 |
| 11. | "Look at You Now (You're Crying)" | | 5:47 |
| 12. | "Mainlining Mystery" | | 6:50 |
| 13. | "Asleep on the Snow" | | 3:31 |
| 14. | "Beatnik" | David Kilgour, Hamish Kilgour, Robert Scott | 4:23 |
| 15. | "He Walked by Nite" | | 2:50 |
| 16. | "Orwell Liberty Dance" | | 2:47 |
| 17. | "Emotion Pictures" | | 2:54 |
| 18. | "Tighten Up!" | | 4:14 |
| 19. | "Germ of Youth Part II" | David Feck, Kay Ishikawa, M.J. "Woodie" Taylor | 2:19 |
| 20. | "Record Prayer" | | 3:39 |

== Notes ==
- Tracks 1, 20: "Jack Nance Hair" 7" (Mei Mei)
- Tracks 2, 14: "You Can't Hide Your Love Forever" 7" (Fortuna Pop!)
- Tracks 3, 17, 18: Peel Session
- Tracks 4, 5, 15: Mailorder Freak Singles Club 7" (Kill Rock Stars)
- Tracks 6, 12: "Beautiful Despair" 12" (What's Your Rupture?)
- Tracks 7, 10: "Love Without Lies" 7" (What's Your Rupture?)
- Track 11: Fields and Streams CD
- Tracks 16, 19: "Red Menace" 7" (PIAO)
