= Kicks (1990s album) =

Studio album by 1990s
- Released: 23 March 2009
- Genre: Indie rock
- Length: 39:59
- Label: Rough Trade
- Producer: Bernard Butler

1990s chronology
Cookies (2007)	Kicks (2009)

Professional ratings
Aggregate scores
Source	Rating
Metacritic	65/100
Review scores
Source	Rating
Allmusic	2.5/5 stars
BBC	(favourable)
NME	7/10 stars
Pitchfork Media	(4.9/10)
Spin	2.5/5 stars
Rolling Stone	(Positive)

Kicks is the second studio album by Scottish band 1990s.

== Track listing ==
1. "Vondel Park" – 3:48
2. "Tell Me When You're Ready" – 2:42
3. "I Don't Even Know What That Is" – 2:53
4. "59" – 3:51
5. "Kickstrasse" – 2:55
6. "Everybody Please Relax" – 3:24
7. "Balthazar" – 3:57
8. "Local Science" – 3:34
9. "The Box" – 4:07
10. "Giddy Up" – 2:42
11. "The Kids" – 2:34
12. "Sparks" – 3:30
13. "Easter Bunny (iTunes Bonus Track)" – 2:48
