= Julian Corrie =

English musician

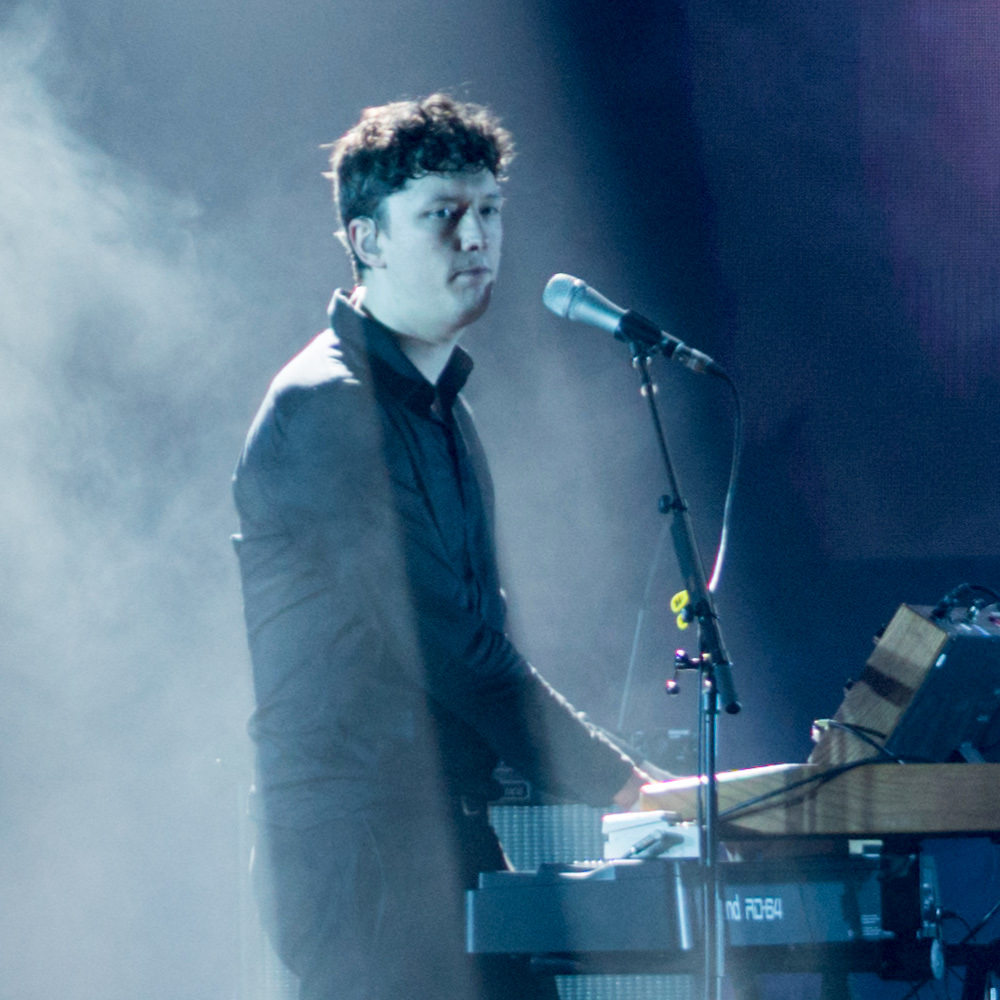
- Corrie performing with Franz Ferdinand in 2018

Background information
- Also known as: Miaoux Miaoux
- Born: Julian Victor Corrie; 20 June 1985 (age 41); Nottingham, England
- Genres: Indie pop; synthpop; indie rock
- Occupations: Record producer; musician; songwriter
- Instruments: Keyboards; synthesizer; guitar
- Years active: 2007–present
- Label: Chemikal Underground
- Member of: Franz Ferdinand

Julian Victor Corrie (born 20 June 1985), also known by his stage name Miaoux Miaoux, is an English producer, musician and songwriter based in Glasgow, Scotland, and a member of Scottish indie rock band Franz Ferdinand. He was previously a member of the Glasgow-based band Maple Leaves.

Prior to joining Franz Ferdinand, he was signed to Chemikal Underground Records and released solo albums Light of the North and School of Velocity. He has created remixes for Chvrches, Belle & Sebastian and Lindstrøm, amongst others. Corrie played all the instruments on recordings himself, and performed live with drummer Liam Chapman (Prehistoric Friends, Quickbeam, Friends in America) and bassist Liam Graham. He was also previously a member of the Glasgow-based band Maple Leaves.

== Early life and education ==
Corrie was born in Nottingham, England. He spent his early childhood in Miraflores district of Lima, Peru, where his father worked. Corrie studied the piano from a young age, and was introduced by his older brother to sample-based music, including Portishead and the Propellerheads. He completed the Tonmeister degree at the University of Surrey.

== Career ==
After graduation, Corrie took up a placement at BBC Scotland in Glasgow, where he worked as a sound engineer until 2016.

Light of the North was recorded and produced by Corrie himself, and mixed by Paul Savage at Chem 19 Recording Studios. It was nominated for the Scottish Album of the Year Award in 2013. The album artwork is by James Houston, a frequent collaborator of Corrie's, particularly in Polybius, a short for Channel 4's Random Acts, which Houston directed. Corrie produced the single "I.D.L.U" by Bdy_Prts, a project by Jill O'Sullivan of Sparrow and the Workshop and Jenny Reeve of Strike the Colours which was released on 3 March 2014. He has worked alongside comedian Robert Florence, producing tracks for the television show Burnistoun. Florence's production company, Bold Yin Productions, also produced award-winning artist Rachel Maclean's short Germs for Channel 4, for which Corrie provided music and sound design. Corrie has continued to work on further projects with Rachel Maclean as well as the National Theatre of Scotland.

The album was favourably reviewed by Drowned in Sound, The Scotsman, The Skinny, The Line Of Best Fit, and The List.

On 19 May 2017, it was announced that Corrie had joined Franz Ferdinand along with fellow new member Dino Bardot as the band's new keyboard and synthesizer player.

== Discography ==
=== as Miaoux Miaoux ===
==== Albums ====
- Rainbow Bubbles, released 8 February 2007, Koshka Records
1. "The Colours of Glass"
2. "Drip Neon"
3. "Clock Goddess"
4. "Harbour Lights"
5. "Rainbow Bubbles"
6. "Voltage Smoke"
7. "Osaka Switch"
8. "Cherry Blossom Traffic"
9. "I am a Microbe"
10. "Monochrome"
- Light of the North, released 8 June 2012, Chemikal Underground Records
1. "Sweep Clean"
2. "Autopilot"
3. "Hey Sound!"
4. "Better For Now"
5. "Cloud Computer"
6. "Is It A Dream? (feat Anna Miles)"
7. "Virtua Fighter (feat Profisee)"
8. "Stop The Clocks"
9. "Singing In The Dark"
10. "Ribbon Falls"
- School of Velocity, released June 2015, Chemikal Underground Records
1. "Launch Loop"
2. "A Flutter Echo"
3. "Star Sickness"
4. "Luxury Discovery"
5. "School Of Velocity"
6. "Giga Shrug"
7. "It's The Quick"
8. "Peaks Beyond Peaks"
9. "Unbeatable Slow Machine"
10. "Mostly Love, Now"

==== EPs ====
- Blooms, released 16 March 2010, Test Pilot Music Ltd
1. "Pixellated"
2. "Dream On"
3. "Snow"
- The Japanese War Effort/Fox Gut Daata/Miaoux Miaoux/Wounded Knee Split EP, released 6 December 2010, Gerry Loves Records
1. "The Japanese War Effort - Ribbit"
2. "Fox Gut Daata - Part Of You That Meant To Go On Living"
3. "Miaoux Miaoux - Emitter"
4. "Wounded Knee - Tomlinson's Rant"
5. "The Japanese War Effort - Ribbit (Miaoux Miaoux Remix)"
6. "Fox Gut Daata - Part Of You That Meant To Go On Living (The Japanese War Effort Remix)"
7. "Miaoux Miaoux - Emitter (Wounded Knee Remix)"
8. "Wounded Knee - Tomlinson's Rant (Fox Gut Daata Remix)"
- Autopilot, released 12 October 2012, Chemikal Underground Records

==== Singles ====
- Hey Sound!/Cloud Computer, released 23 May 2011, Eli and Oz
1. "Hey Sound!"
2. "Cloud Computer"
- Better for Now, released 15 June 2012, Chemikal Underground Records
1. "Better For Now"
2. "Harlem Globetripper"

=== With Franz Ferdinand ===
==== Albums ====
- Always Ascending, released 9 February 2018, Domino Recording Company
1. "Always Ascending"
2. "Lazy Boy"
3. "Paper Cages"
4. "Finally"
5. "The Academy Award"
6. "Lois Lane"
7. "Huck And Jim"
8. "Glimpse Of Love"
9. "Feel The Love Go"
10. "Slow Don't Kill Me Slow"
- The Human Fear, released 10 January 2025, Domino Recording Company
1. "Audacious"
2. "Everydaydreamer"
3. "The Doctor"
4. "Hooked"
5. "Build It Up"
6. "Night Or Day"
7. "Bar Lonely"
8. "Cats"
9. "Black Eyelashes"
10. "Tell Me I Should Stay"
11. "The Birds"

=== With Maple Leaves ===
==== EPs ====
- Golden Ether, released 20 October 2010, Bubblegum Records
1. "Golden Ether"
2. "Drunk at the Pulpit"
3. "Empire"
4. "What a Day"
- Threads, released 14 February 2011
1. "Tapestry"
2. "Kirsty"
3. "Easy Speak"
4. "Fields"
5. "Fields (Miaoux Miaoux remix)"
- Robots, released 27 May 2012, Mute Commuter Records
1. "Robots"
2. "Missing Parts"
3. "Those Arms"
4. "Still Life"

==== Singles ====
- Kirsty/Easy Speak, released 9 July 2009, Koshka Records
1. "Kirsty"
2. "Easy Speak"
- Tapestry, released 2 June 2010, Koshka Records
1. "Tapestry"
2. "Fields"

== Remixes ==
- Arab Strap, The First Big Weekend of 2016
- Chvrches, The Mother We Share, The Mother We Share (single), released 13 September 2013 (vinyl only), National Anthem Records
- Belle & Sebastian, Your Cover's Blown, The Third Eye Centre (album), released 26 August 2013, Rough Trade
- Panamah, Born Af Natten, Sounds of Copenhagen Volume 11 (compilation album), released 19 August 2013, Good Tape Records
- I am Dive, The Cliff, Driftwood (album), released 16 June 2013, Foehn Records
- Chopin, 2 Nocturnes op.55: no.1 in F minor, Variations of Chopin (remix compilation album), released 13 May 2013, Too Many Fireworks Records
- Lindstrom, Rà-àkõ-st, promotional release for Smalhans (album) released 17 October 2012, The Quietus
- Human Don't Be Angry, 1985, 1985 (single), released 18 May 2012, Chemikal Underground Records
- Discopolis, Zenithobia, Zenithobia (Remixes) (EP), released 5 March 2012, KIDS Records
- Adam Stafford, Shot-down You Summer Wannabes, Fire & Theft (single), released 22 August 2011, Wise Blood Industries
- Futuristic Retro Champions, May The Forth, Love and Lemonade (album), released 4 April 2011, Everything Flows
- Japanese War Effort, Ribbit, The Japanese War Effort/Fox Gut Daata/Miaoux Miaoux/Wounded Knee Split EP (EP), released 6 December 2010, Gerry Loves Records
- Maple Leaves, Fields, Threads EP, released 14 February 2011
- Zoey Van Goey, Song to the Embers, Foxtrot Vandals (single), released 15 October 2007, Zoey Van Goey
