= Idles discography =

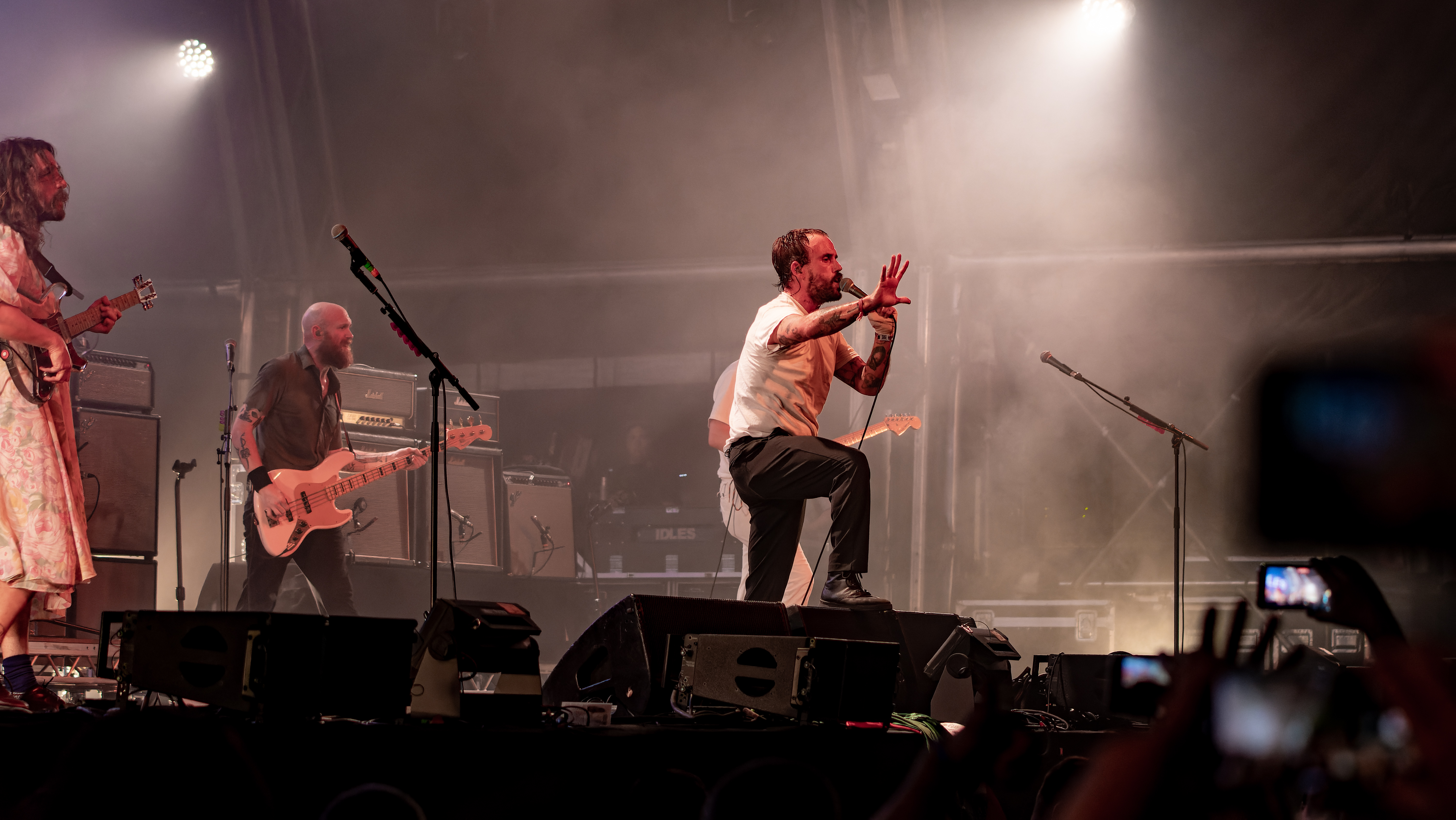
- Idles in 2022
- Studio albums: 5
- EPs: 5
- Live albums: 2
- Singles: 18
- Video albums: 1
- Music videos: 28

Idles are a British-Irish post-punk band. Formed in Bristol in 2009, the band consists of Joe Talbot (vocals), Mark Bowen (guitar), Lee Kiernan (guitar), Adam Devonshire (bass) and Jon Beavis (drums). The band released five extended plays before they released their debut album, Brutalism in 2017. Brutalism was met to critical acclaim, as was their second, third and fourth studio albums, Joy as an Act of Resistance in 2018, Ultra Mono in 2020, and Crawler in 2021. The band's fifth studio album, Tangk, was released on 16 February 2024.

== Albums ==
=== Studio albums ===
Title	Details	Peak chart positions											Sales	Certifications
Title	Details	UK	BEL (FL)	BEL (WA)	FRA	GER	IRL	NLD	POR	SCO	SWI	US	Sales	Certifications
Brutalism	Released: 10 March 2017; Label: Balley, Partisan; Format: CD, LP, digital download, online streaming	65	—	—	—	—	—	—	—	—	—	—	UK: 65,983	BPI: Silver
Joy as an Act of Resistance	Released: 31 August 2018; Label: Partisan; Format: CD, LP, digital download, online streaming	5	20	81	74	49	56	108	—	6	49	— (Note: Joy as an Act of Resistance did not enter the US Billboard 200, but peaked at number four on the US Billboard Heatseekers chart.)	UK: 98,441	BPI: Gold
Ultra Mono	Released: 25 September 2020; Label: Partisan; Format: CD, LP, cassette, digital download, online streaming	1	8	15	44	14	3	18	12	1	21	54	UK: 58,503; US: 13,000	BPI: Silver
Crawler	Released: 12 November 2021; Label: Partisan; Format: CD, LP, cassette, digital download, online streaming	6	15	29	68	15	29	43	—	8	65	— (Note: Crawler did not enter the US Billboard 200, but peaked at number 30 on the US Billboard Top Album Sales chart.)	UK: 41,099	
Tangk	Released: 16 February 2024; Label: Partisan; Format: CD, LP, digital download, online streaming	1	2	11	22	2	7	13	20	1	8	132	UK: 20,230	
"—" denotes a recording that did not chart or was not released in that territory.

=== Live albums ===
Title	Details	Peak chart positions			
Title	Details	UK	BEL (WA)	SCO	US Heat
A Beautiful Thing: Idles Live at le Bataclan	Released: 6 December 2019; Label: Partisan	59	182	36	17
Live at Ramsgate Music Hall	Released: 24 April 2020; Label: Self-released	—	—	—	—

== Extended plays ==
Title	Details
Idles	Released: 28 May 2011; Label: Self-released; Formats: CD
Welcome	Released: 4 August 2012; Label: Fear of Fiction; Formats: Digital, CD, LP
Meat	Released: 30 October 2015; Label: Balley; Formats: Digital, CD, LP
Meta	Released: 2016; Label: Balley; Formats: Digital, CD, LP
Meat / Meta	Released: 13 August 2019; Label: Balley; Formats: Digital, CD, LP
Live @ Glastonbury	Released: 29 Nov 2024; Label: Partisan Records/BBC; Formats: vinyl

== Demos ==
Title	Details
Meat // Anguish	Released: 2016; Label: Harmacy; Formats: Cassette

== Singles ==
List of singles, with selected chart positions, showing year released and album name
Title	Year	Peak chart positions						Album
Title	Year	UK Sales	UK Indie	UK Phys.	UK Vinyl	BEL (FL) Tip	SCO	Album
"Queens"	2014	21	—	1	1	—	43	Meat
"Divide & Conquer"	2016	—	—	—	—	—	—	Brutalism
"Well Done"	2016	—	—	—	—	—	—	Brutalism
"Stendhal Syndrome"	2017	—	—	—	—	—	—	Brutalism
"Mother"	2017	—	—	—	—	—	—	Brutalism
"Colossus"	2018	—	—	—	—	—	—	Joy as an Act of Resistance
"Danny Nedelko"	2018	—	—	3	3	—	—	Joy as an Act of Resistance
"Samaritans"	2018	—	—	—	—	—	—	Joy as an Act of Resistance
"Great"	2018	—	—	—	—	— (Note: "Great" did not enter the Flanders Ultratop 50, but did appeared on the Ultratip "extra tips" chart.)	—	Joy as an Act of Resistance
"Never Fight a Man with a Perm"	2019	—	—	—	—	—	—	Joy as an Act of Resistance
"Mercedes Marxist"	2019	49	—	2	2	— (Note: "Mercedes Marxist" did not enter the Flanders Ultratop 50, but did appeared on the Ultratip "extra tips" chart.)	82	Non-album singles
"I Dream Guillotine"	2019	—	—	—	—	—	—	Non-album singles
"Mr. Motivator"	2020	—	—	—	—	46	—	Ultra Mono
"Grounds"	2020	—	—	—	—	—	—	Ultra Mono
"A Hymn"	2020	—	—	—	—	—	—	Ultra Mono
"Model Village" (solo or featuring Slowthai)	2020	16	—	4	3	45	—	Ultra Mono
"War"	2020	—	47	—	—	—	—	Ultra Mono
"Reigns"	2020	—	—	—	—	— (Note: "Reigns" did not enter the Flanders Ultratop 50, but did appeared on the Ultratip "extra tips" chart.)	—	Ultra Mono
"Peace Signs"	2021	—	—	—	—	—	—	Epic Ten
"Damaged Goods" (featuring Gang of Four)	2021	—	—	—	—	—	—	The Problem of Leisure: A Celebration of Andy Gill & Gang of Four
"Sodium"	2021	—	—	—	—	—	—	Dark Knights: Death Metal Soundtrack
"The God That Failed"	2021	—	—	—	—	—	—	The Metallica Blacklist
"The Beachland Ballroom"	2021	—	—	—	—	—	—	Crawler
"Car Crash"	2021	—	—	—	—	—	—	Crawler
"Crawl!"	2022	—	—	—	—	—	—	Crawler
"Dancer" (featuring LCD Soundsystem)	2023	—	—	—	—	—	—	Tangk
"Grace"	2023	—	—	—	—	—	—	Tangk
"Gift Horse"	2024	—	—	—	—	—	—	Tangk
"—" denotes release did not chart.

== Remixes ==
Title	Year	Artist	Ref.
"Wedding Bells" (IDLES 'Til Dev do us Party Remix)	2019	Metronomy	
"It Is What It Is" (IDLES Remix)	2019	Melt Yourself Down	
"Switching On" (IDLES Remix)	2020	LIFE	
"The Passover" (IDLES Remix)	2020	Sex Swing	
"Midnight Flit" (IDLES Midday Still At It Remix)	2021	Mogwai	
"POGO" (IDLES Remix)	2021	Organek	
"Pay Your Way in Pain" (IDLES Remix)	2021	St. Vincent	
"Talking to Ourselves" (IDLES Inner Monologue Remix)	2022	Rise Against	
"Heat" (IDLES Remix)	2022	Whispering Sons	
"Negativland" (Idles Negative Space Rework)	2022	NEU!	
"Heaven Is Here" (IDLES Remix)	2022	Florence and the Machine	

== Music videos ==
Song	Year	Director(s)
"Thieves"	2011	Felix Drake
"26/27"	2012	Felix Drake and Celia Arias
"Germany"	2012	Jean-Paul Gibbs
"Meydei"	2012	Felix Drake
"Two Tone"	2012	Felix Drake
"The Idles Chant"	2014	The Monks
"Queens"	2015	Joe Talbot
"Romantic Gestures"	2015	Joe Talbot
"Well Done"	2016	Mario Mangata
"Divide & Conquer"	2016	Joseph Talbot
"Stendhal Syndrome"	2017	Lee Kiernan
"Mother"	2017	Joe Talbot
"Colossus"	2018	Will Hooper
"Danny Nedelko"	2018	Lee Kiernan
"Samaritans"	2018	Theo Watkins
"Great"	2018	Theo Watkins
"Never Fight a Man with a Perm"	2019	Al Brown
"Mercedes Marxist"	2019	Will Lovelace & Dylan Southern of ThirtyTwo
"Mr. Motivator"	2020	Joe Talbot
"Grounds"	2020	Rob French
"A Hymn"	2020	Ryan Gander
"Model Village"	2020	Michel and Oliver Gondry
"War"	2020	Will Dohrn
"Kill Them With Kindness"	2020	James Carbutt
"Reigns"	2021	Theo Watkins
"The Beachland Ballroom"	2021	LOOSE
"Car Crash"	2021	Lee Kiernan
"When the Lights Comes On"	2021	Lee Kiernan HHWH
"Crawl!"	2022	Eddie Lawrence
"Dancer"	2023	Jocelyn Anquetil
"Gift Horse"	2024	David Helman
"Grace"	2024	Jonathan Irwin

== Guest features ==
- "Wish" (from the Anna Calvi album, Hunted)
- "None of Us Are Getting Out of This Life Alive" (from The Streets mixtape, None of Us Are Getting Out of This Life Alive)
- "The God of Lying" (from the Gorillaz album, The Mountain)
