= The Boys Club =

1996 film by John Fawcett

- The Boys Club
- Directed by: John Fawcett
- Written by: Doug Smith (story); Peter Wellington (screenplay)
- Screenplay by: Peter Wellington
- Story by: Doug Smith
- Produced by: Tim O'Brien; Greg Dummett
- Starring: Chris Penn; Dominic Zamprogna; Devon Sawa; Stuart Stone; Amy Stewart; Nicholas Campbell
- Cinematography: Thom Best
- Edited by: Susan Maggi
- Music by: Michael Timmins (music composer); Jeff Bird (music composer)
- Production companies: Alliance Communications Corporation; Actra; Le Monde Entertainment; B&D Films; Ontario Film Development Corporation; St. Nick Productions; Téléfilm Canada
- Distributed by: Alliance Communications Corporation
- Release date: September 19, 1996 (Canada)
- Running time: 91
- Country: Canada
- Language: English
- Budget: CA$1,500,000

The Boys Club is a 1996 Canadian crime drama thriller film directed by John Fawcett, and Peter Wellington (writer), and starring Chris Penn, Devon Sawa, Dominic Zamprogna, and Stuart Stone. It was released theatrically in 1996 in Canada by Alliance Films.

== Plot ==
Three teenage boys in small-town Southern Ontario are thrilled when Luke Cooper, a mysterious American fugitive with a gunshot wound in his leg, decides to crash their secret hideout. Luke tells them that he's a cop on the run from corrupt colleagues, and swears them to silence.

As he recuperates, he becomes their buddy and confidant. By the time the boys realize Luke is not who he pretends to be, they are in way over their heads.

== Cast ==
- Chris Penn as Luke
- Dominic Zamprogna as Kyle
- Stuart Stone as Brad
- Devon Sawa as Eric
- Amy Stewart (Canadian Actress) as Megan
- Nicholas Campbell as Kyle's Dad
- Jarred Blanchard as Jake
- Max Piersig as Simon
- Julian Richings as Officer Cole
- Alana Shields as Brad's Mom
- Sean Dick as Bobby
- Peter Van Wart as Eric's Father
- Heidi von Palleske as Eric's Mother
- Bif Naked as Liquor Store Manager
- Brock Curley as Liquor Store Cashier

== Production ==
The movie was filmed in Georgetown, Ontario, Mississauga, Ontario, and Toronto, Ontario, Canada.

== Soundtrack ==
1. "Harnessed in Slums", Archers of Loaf
2. "Universe", Eric's Trip
3. "Failed You", The Pasties
4. "Old Enough", Crash Vegas
5. "Devil", Drugstore
6. "Disease", Sister Machine Gun
7. "Coconut Cream", The Tragically Hip
8. "Jesus", Vowel Movement
9. "Misogyny", Rusty
10. "Too Easy", Wagbeard
11. "Gun Pointed", Taste of Joy
12. "Monkeysucker", The Killjoys
13. "Everything", The Killjoys
14. "Morphine", Moist
15. "You Shine Bright", Crash Vegas
16. "My Favorite Martian", The Doughboys
17. "The Letter", Bif Naked
18. "Over Your Shoulder", Motörhead
19. "Moment", Crawl
20. "Neighborhood Villains", The Doughboys
21. "The Secret", 54-40

== Release ==
The Boys Club was released on VHS in Canada by Alliance Video and on Laserdisc by Image Entertainment. It was released on VHS in the USA by A.Pix Entertainment and on DVD by Ardustry Home Entertainment, in 2003 it was re-released on DVD by Simitar Entertainment.

== Awards and nominations ==
The film garnered five Genie Award nominations at the 17th Genie Awards in 1996:

- Best Director (John Fawcett)
- Best Actor (Chris Penn)
- Best Art Direction/Production Design (Taavo Soodor)
- Best Editing (Susan Maggi)
- Best Screenplay (Doug Smith) and (Peter Wellington (director))
