= Welcome (EP) =

EP by Idles
- Released: 4 August 2012
- Recorded: Fall 2011
- Genre: Post-punk revival
- Length: 17:40
- Label: Fear Of Fiction

Idles chronology
Idles (2011)	Welcome (2012)	Meat (2015)

Singles from Welcome
- 1. "26/27" Released: 27 June 2012

Welcome is the first extended play by British rock band Idles. The extended play was released originally as a demo on 31 December 2011 before being released for the public on 4 August 2012 through independent label, Fear Of Fiction.

The extended play has been described as drastically different from their current work, as the sound of this EP has been compared to having a more cleaner, post-punk sound more akin to the likes of Interpol, Editors, and Radio 4.

== Background ==
At the time of recording this album, the band was just a music duo, composed of singer Joe Talbot and bassist Adam Devonshire, who met while at College in Exeter, eventually deciding to start a band.

Idles have their roots in the Bat-Cave Night Club in Bristol. According to Talbot, "It took us a long time to get productive because we didn’t know what the fuck we were doing at all, we were fucking terrible for a long time." The band's first release was the Welcome EP in 2012. By 2014 the band comprised Talbot, Devonshire, guitarists Mark Bowen and Lee Kiernan, and drummer Jon Beavis. They released a second EP, Meat, and Meta, an EP of remixes, in 2015, and then started writing songs for their debut album.

== Critical reception ==
At the time of the EP, the band was still relatively unknown outside of the local music scene in their native Bristol.

Local music website Gold Flake Paint reviewed the album in a mixed review calling it mysterious. Writer Tom Johnson summarized the EP as "across this impressive introduction Idles show glimpses of light and dark, restraint and release, and joy and sorrow; to the point where you’re never quite sure where you stand with them – and whether you are, in fact, welcome at all. Something tells us it’ll be worth sticking around to find out though."

== Track listing ==
No.	Title	Length
1.	"26/27"	5:23
2.	"Meydei"	4:35
3.	"Germany"	3:58
4.	"Two Tone"	3:44
Total length:		17:40

== Legacy ==
Members of the band have stated in retrospect that they hate Welcome and feel that the direction of the extended play was aimless. Critics in retrospective reviews of the EP felt the album was too cautious and sounded too much like other post-punk revival bands rather than their own identity. Of the time of recording and of the EP, Joe Talbot said that "it took us a long time to get productive because we didn’t know what the fuck we were doing at all, we were fucking terrible for a long time."

Nevertheless, the album has been credited as an album that broke Idles into relevancy and fostered fans, although fans have been critical of the album. During a show in September 2018, a fan in the audience requested the band would play a song off of Welcome which was met from giggles and jeers from both people in the audience and members of the band.

Talbot has also felt that Welcome did help the band find their feet in due time although he would not herald the album personally as a music accomplishment.
