= Grammy Award for Best Rock Album =

Honor presented to recording artists for quality rock albums

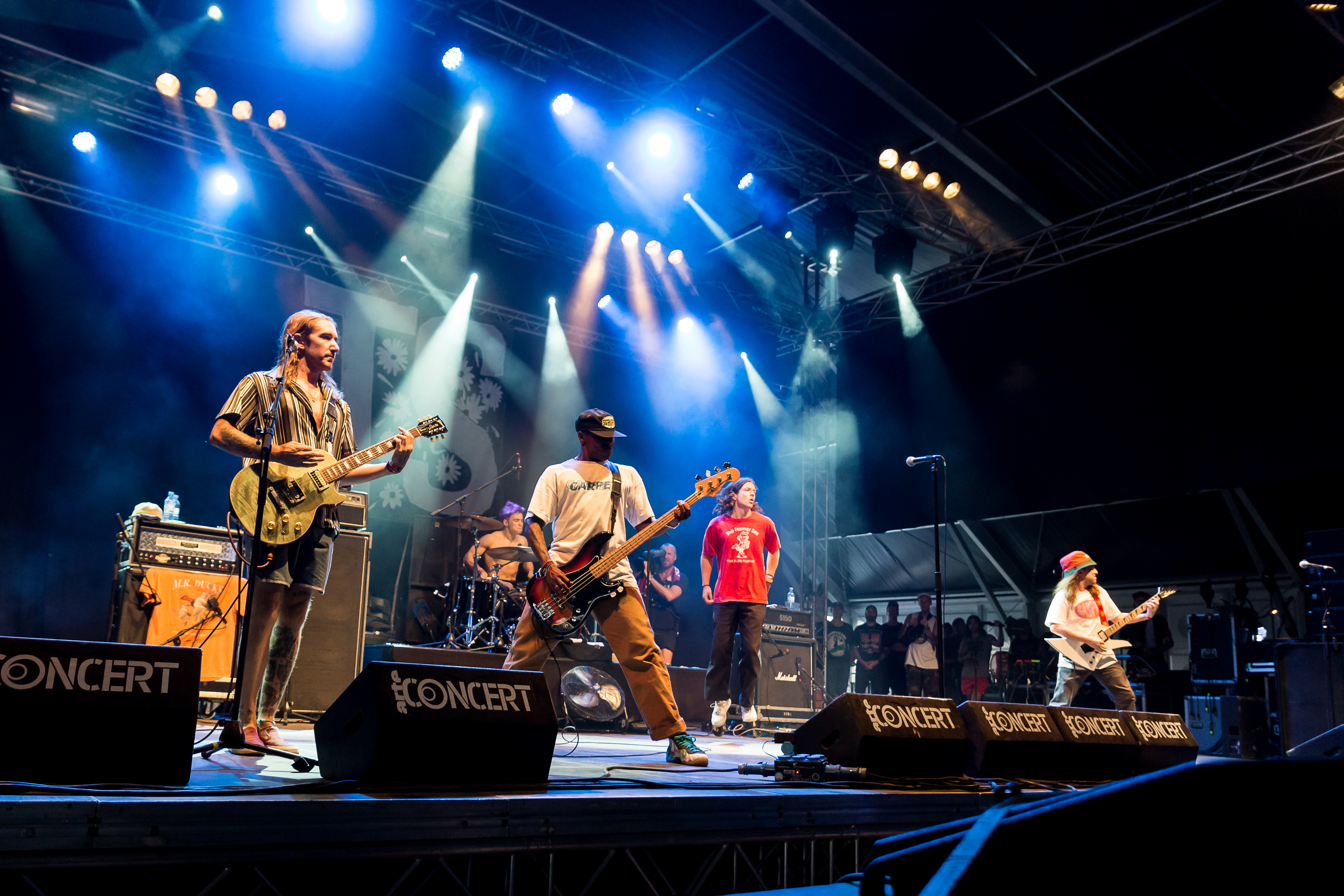
- Never Enough by Turnstile is the most recent recipient
- Awarded for: Quality albums in the rock music genre
- Country: United States
- Presented by: The Recording Academy
- First award: 1995
- Currently held by: Turnstile – Never Enough (2026)
- Website: www.grammy.com

The Grammy Award for Best Rock Album is an award presented at the Grammy Awards, a ceremony that was established in 1958 and originally called the Gramophone Awards, to recording artists for quality albums in the rock music genre. Honors in several categories are presented at the ceremony annually by The Recording Academy of the United States to "honor artistic achievement, technical proficiency and overall excellence in the recording industry, without regard to album sales or chart position".

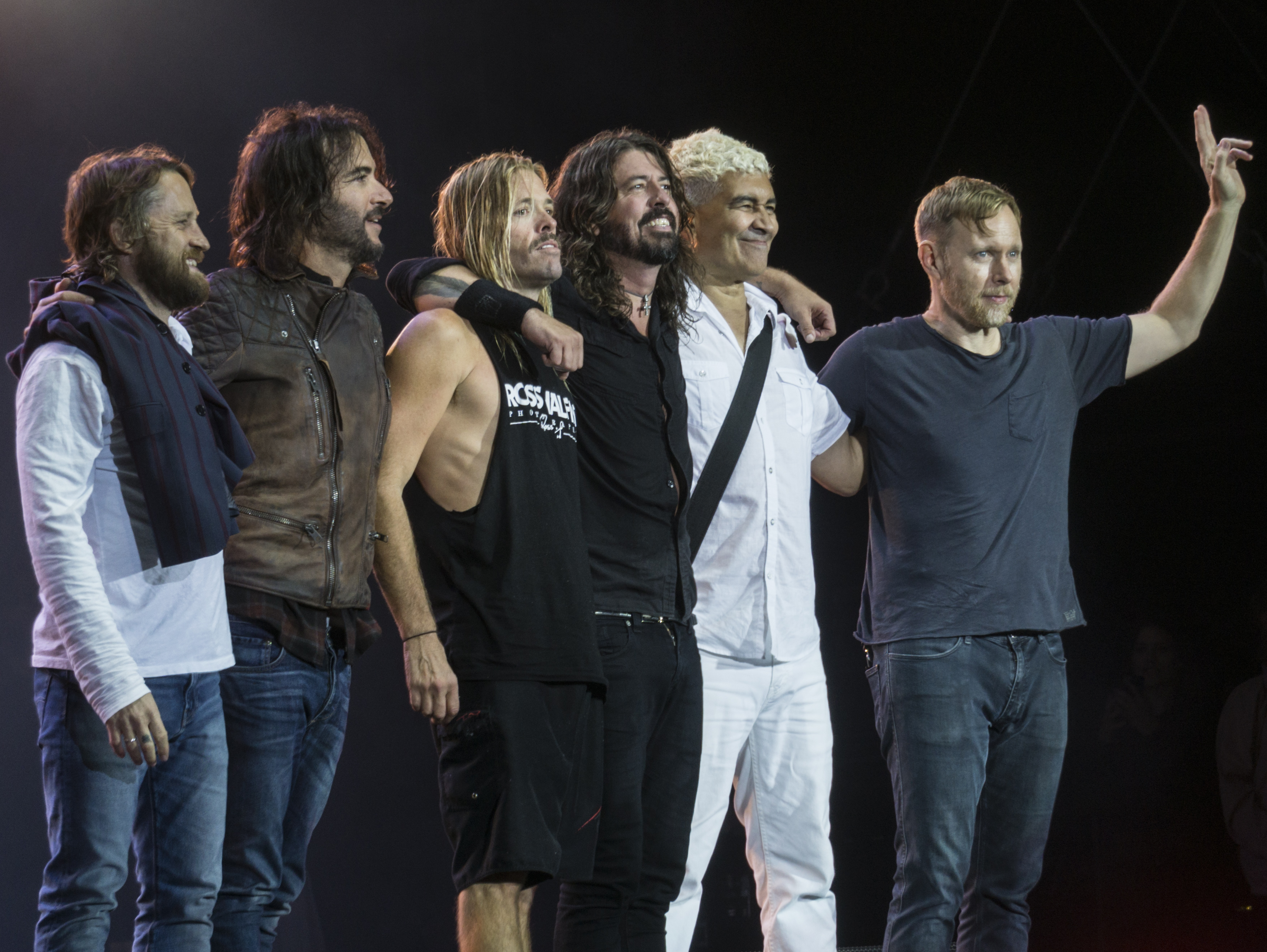
Foo Fighters (pictured in 2017) have won the award more than any other artist or group. They have been nominated for the award a record eight times and won the award a record five times.

The award for Best Rock Album was first presented to the band the Rolling Stones in 1995, and the name of the category has remained unchanged since then. According to the category description guide for the 69th Grammy Awards (2027), the award is presented to "albums containing greater than 66% playing time of new rock, hard rock or metal recordings".

The award goes to the artist, producer and engineer/mixer, provided they were responsible for more than 50 percent of playing time on the album. The lead performing artist is the only one who receives an official nomination. Songwriters of more than 50% of playing time on the album also receive a statuette from 2027. Producers and/or engineers/mixers who are responsible for less than 50 percent, as well as the mastering engineer, can apply for a Winners Certificate. Before 1999, only the performing artist received an award.

The band Foo Fighters currently holds the records for both wins and nominations in this award, with five wins and ten nominations overall. Foo Fighters are also the only three-time, four-time, and five-time winners of the award. In the 2000s, the group famously won the award twice in the span of four years, with their albums There is Nothing Left to Lose in 2001 and One by One in 2004.

Two-time winners include Sheryl Crow, Green Day, U2, Cage the Elephant, and Muse. Neil Young holds the record for most nominations without a win, with seven. To date, only three women, Sheryl Crow, Alanis Morissette, and Hayley Williams of Paramore have won the award. Paramore became the first female-fronted rock band to win the award, at the 66th Annual Grammy Awards.

== Recipients ==
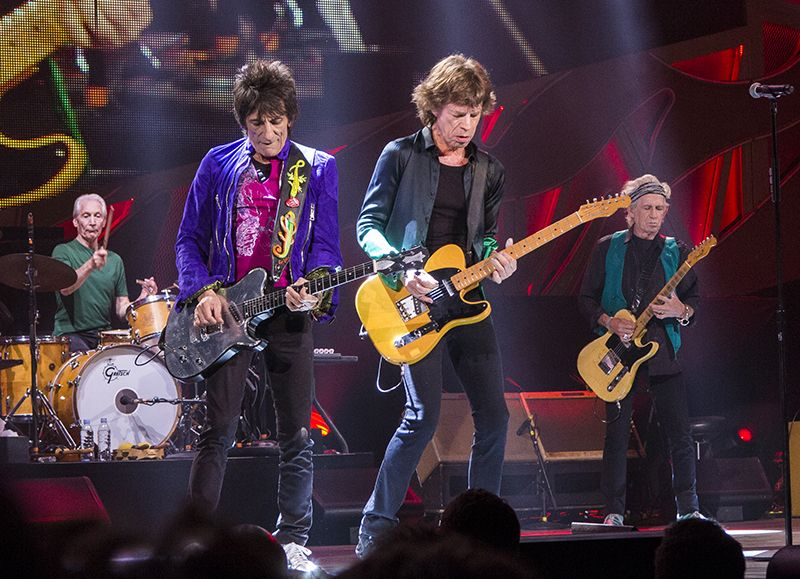
Inagurual recipient the Rolling Stones.

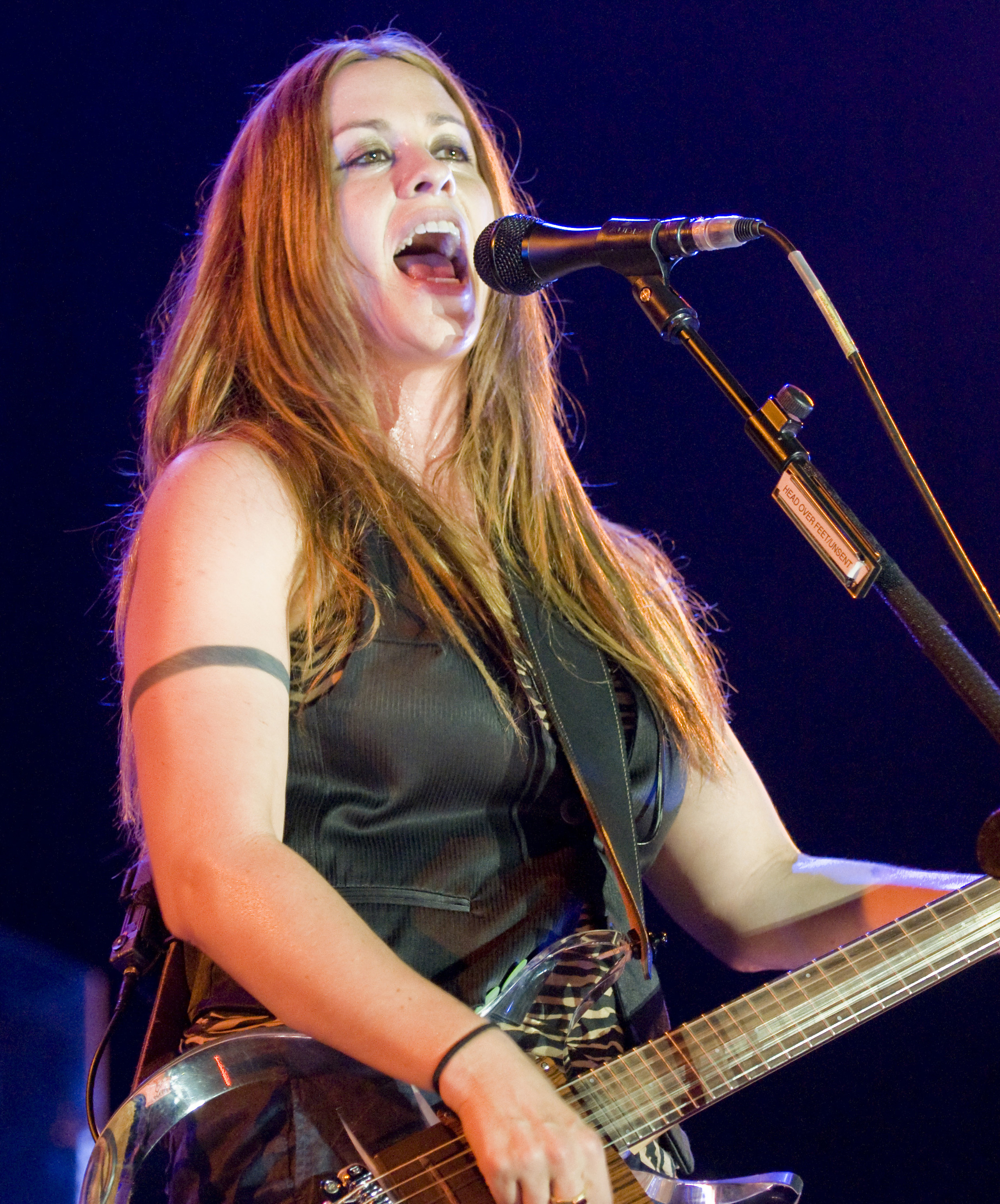
Alanis Morissette was the first woman to win the award.

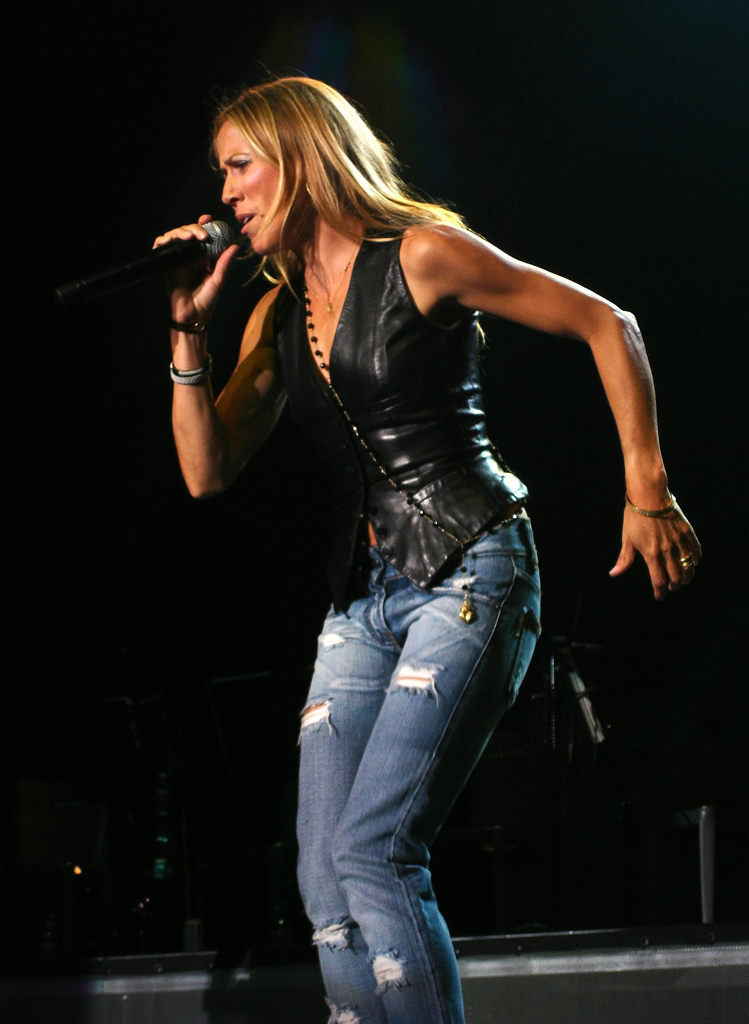
Two-time award winner Sheryl Crow.

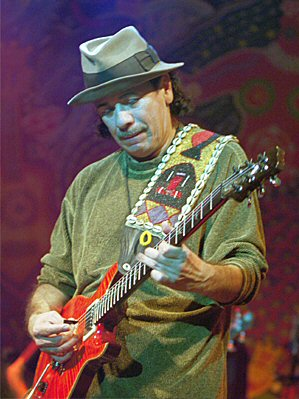
Carlos Santana of the 2000 award-winning band Santana.

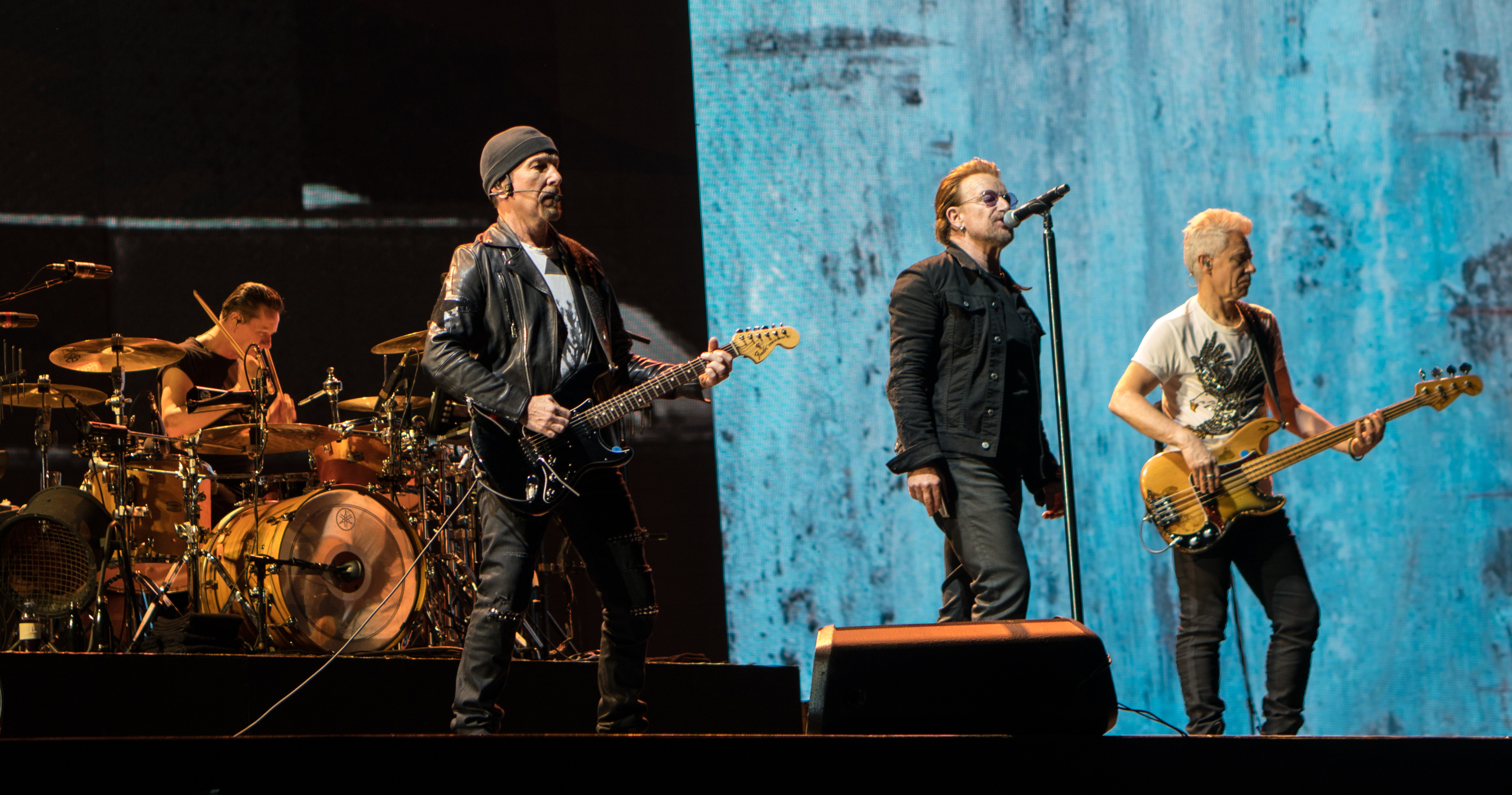
Two-time award-winning band U2, performing during the Joshua Tree Tour 2017.

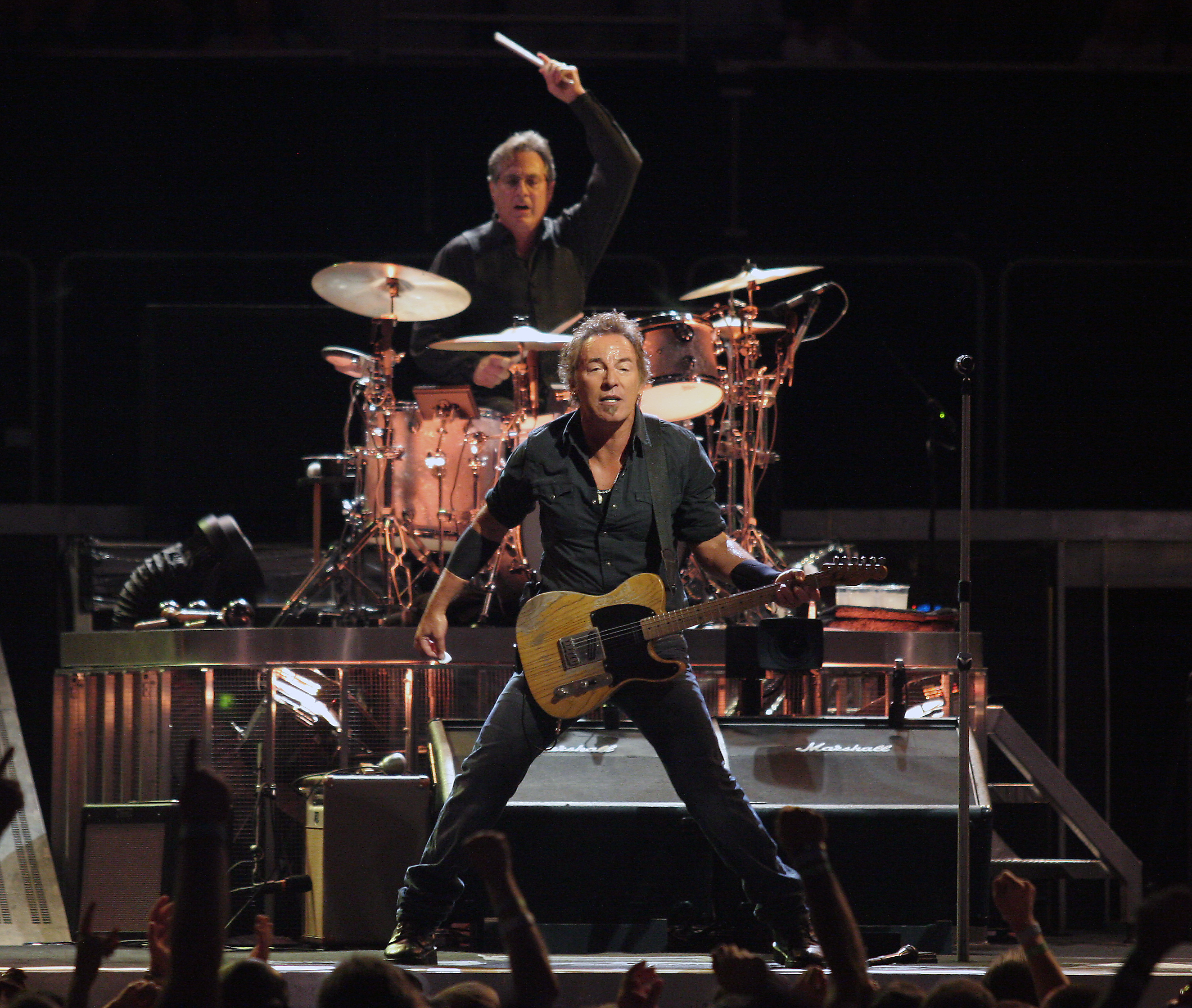
2003 award winner Bruce Springsteen, performing in 2008.

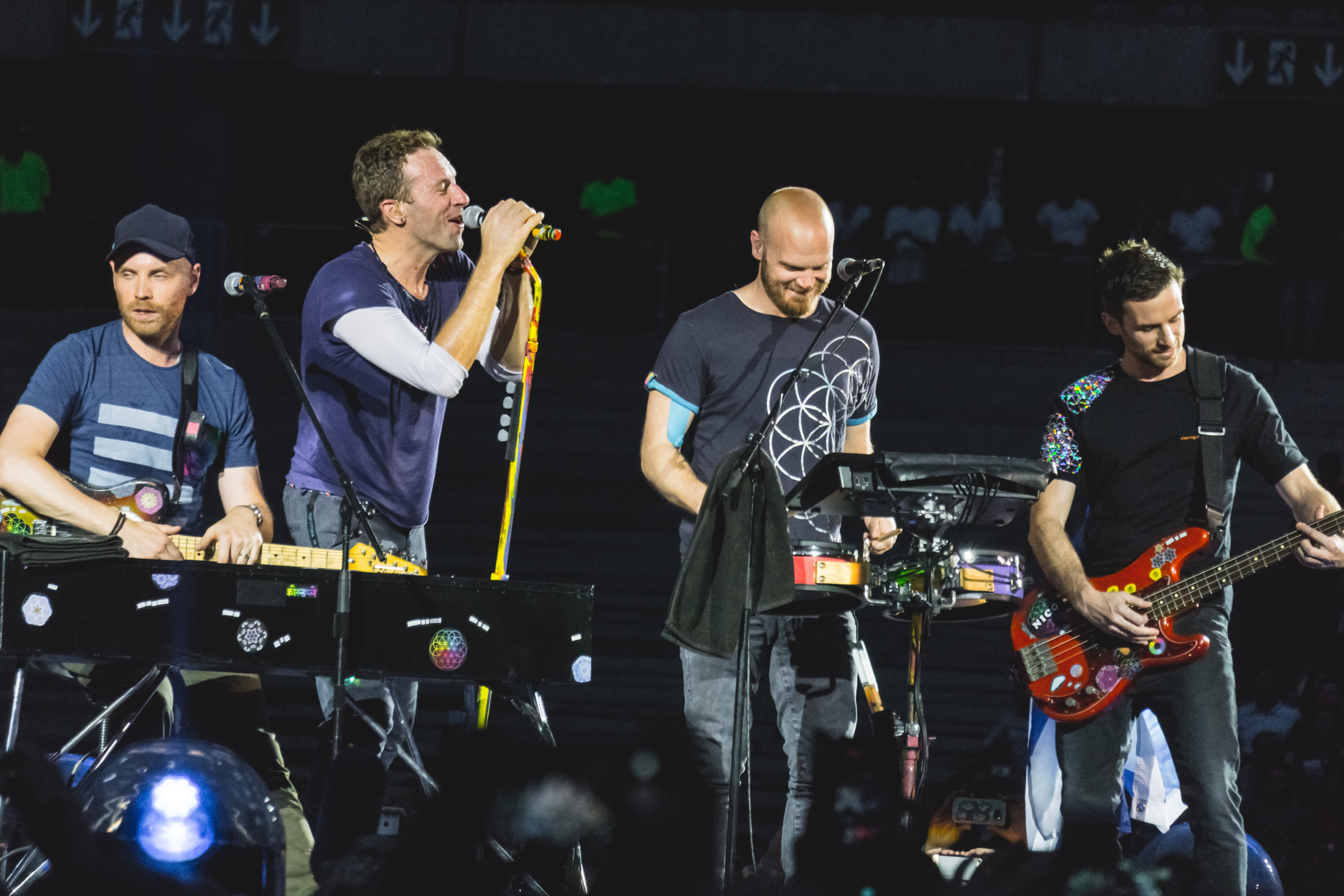
2009 winners Coldplay.

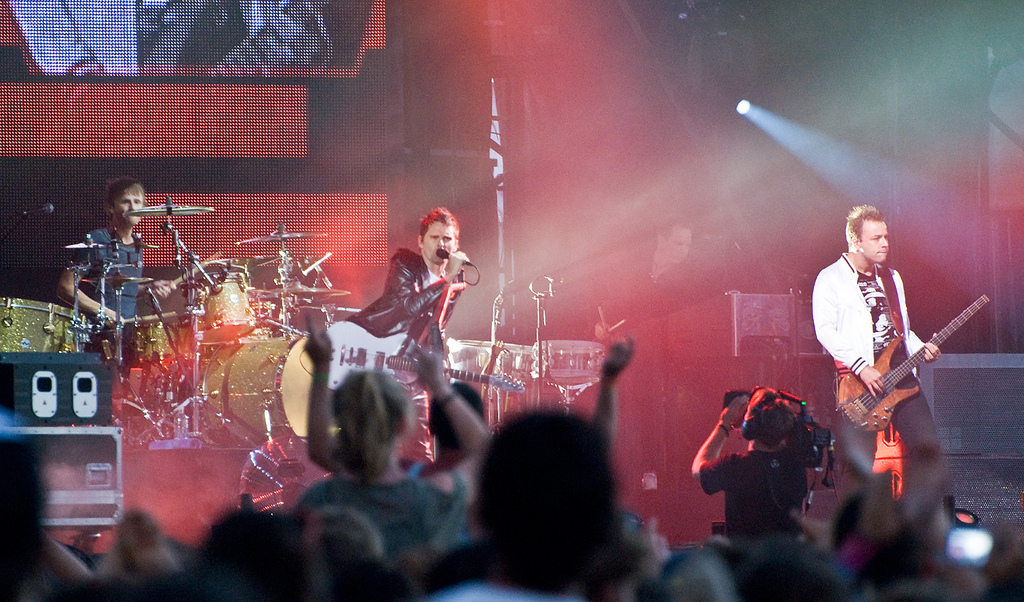
Two-time award-winning band Muse.

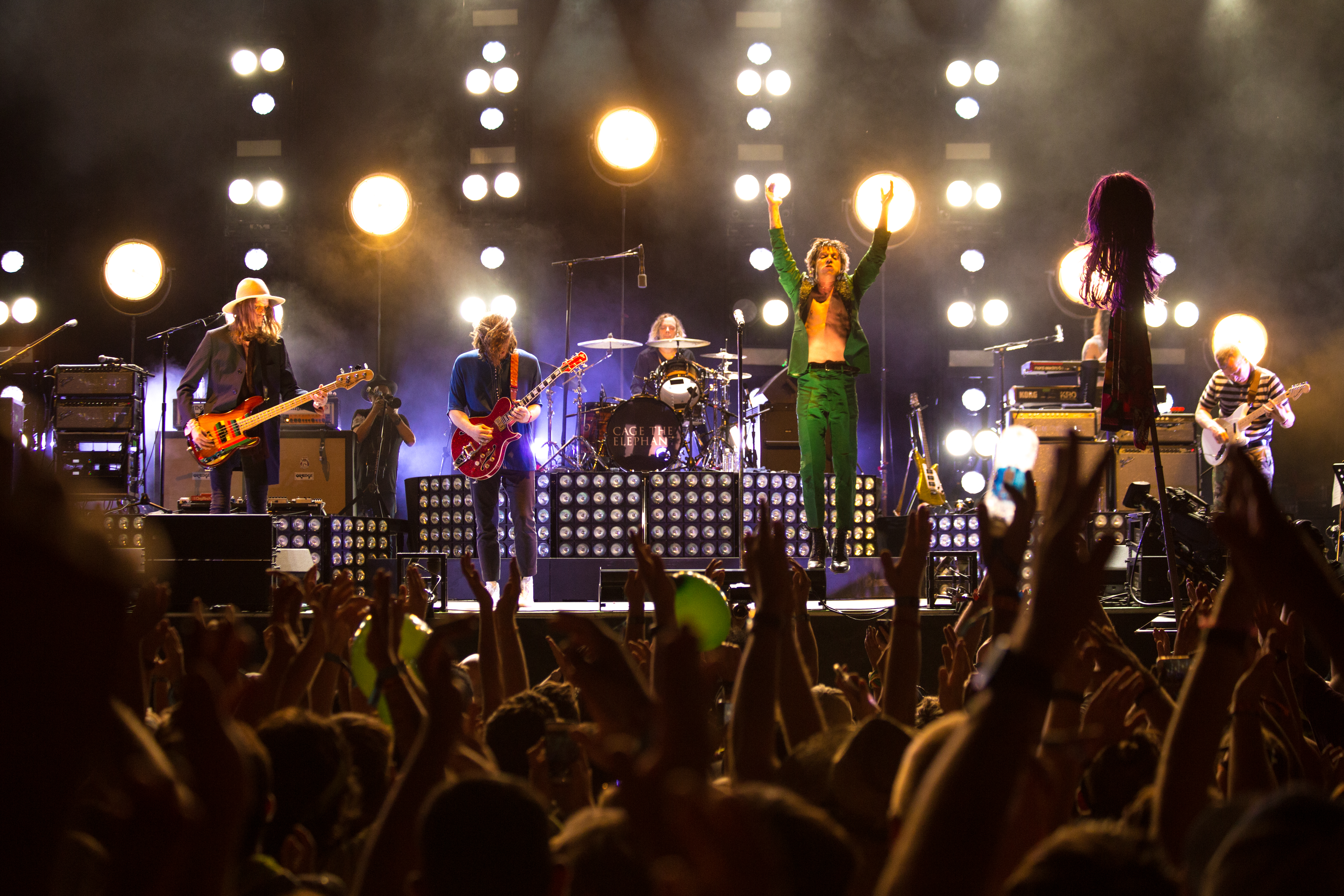
Two-time award-winning band Cage the Elephant.

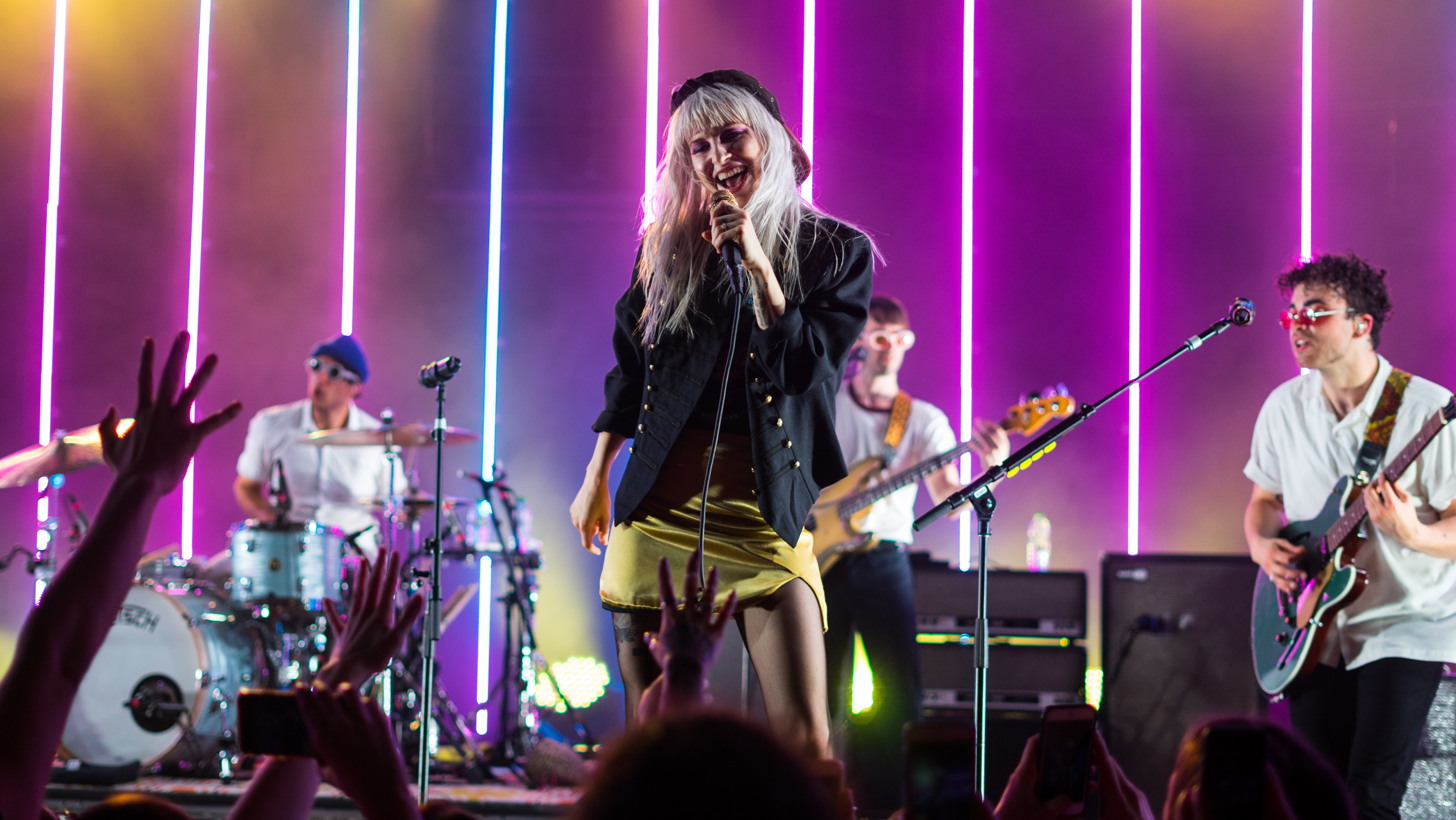
2024 winner Paramore, the first female-fronted band to win the award.

=== 1990s ===
| Year | Work | Artist | Winning producer(s)/engineer(s) |
|---|---|---|---|
| 1995 | Voodoo Lounge | The Rolling Stones | |
| 1995 | Monster | R.E.M. | |
| 1995 | Sleeps with Angels | Neil Young and Crazy Horse | |
| 1995 | Superunknown | Soundgarden | |
| 1995 | Vs. | Pearl Jam | |
| 1996 | Jagged Little Pill | Alanis Morissette | |
| 1996 | Forever Blue | Chris Isaak | |
| 1996 | Mirror Ball | Neil Young | |
| 1996 | Vitalogy | Pearl Jam | |
| 1996 | Wildflowers | Tom Petty | |
| 1997 | Sheryl Crow | Sheryl Crow | |
| 1997 | Broken Arrow | Neil Young and Crazy Horse | |
| 1997 | Crash | Dave Matthews Band | |
| 1997 | Road Tested | Bonnie Raitt | |
| 1997 | Tragic Kingdom | No Doubt | |
| 1998 | Blue Moon Swamp | John Fogerty | |
| 1998 | Bridges to Babylon | The Rolling Stones | |
| 1998 | The Colour and the Shape | Foo Fighters | |
| 1998 | Nine Lives | Aerosmith | |
| 1998 | Pop | U2 | |
| 1999 | The Globe Sessions | Sheryl Crow | Tchad Blake & Trina Shoemaker, engineers/mixers |
| 1999 | Before These Crowded Streets | Dave Matthews Band | |
| 1999 | Celebrity Skin | Hole | |
| 1999 | Premonition | John Fogerty | |
| 1999 | Version 2.0 | Garbage | |

=== 2000s ===
| Year | Work | Artist | Winning producer(s)/engineer(s) |
|---|---|---|---|
| 2000 | Supernatural | Santana | Clive Davis, producer; Steve Fontano, engineer/mixer |
| 2000 | Breakdown | Melissa Etheridge | |
| 2000 | Californication | Red Hot Chili Peppers | |
| 2000 | Echo | Tom Petty and the Heartbreakers | |
| 2000 | Significant Other | Limp Bizkit | |
| 2001 | There Is Nothing Left to Lose | Foo Fighters | Foo Fighters & Adam Kasper, producers; Adam Kasper, engineer/mixer |
| 2001 | The Battle of Los Angeles | Rage Against the Machine | |
| 2001 | Crush | Bon Jovi | |
| 2001 | Mad Season | Matchbox Twenty | |
| 2001 | Return of Saturn | No Doubt | |
| 2002 | All That You Can't Leave Behind | U2 | Brian Eno & Daniel Lanois. producers; Richard Rainey, engineer/mixer |
| 2002 | Gold | Ryan Adams | |
| 2002 | Hybrid Theory | Linkin Park | |
| 2002 | Just Push Play | Aerosmith | |
| 2002 | Stories from the City, Stories from the Sea | PJ Harvey | |
| 2003 | The Rising | Bruce Springsteen | Brendan O'Brien, producer; Nick DiDia & Brendan O'Brien, engineers/mixers |
| 2003 | C'mon, C'mon | Sheryl Crow | |
| 2003 | Dreamland | Robert Plant | |
| 2003 | Head on Straight | Tonic | |
| 2003 | When I Was Cruel | Elvis Costello | |
| 2004 | One by One | Foo Fighters | David Grohl, Taylor Hawkins, Nate Mendel, Nick Raskulinecz & Chris Shiflett, producers; Jim Scott, engineer/mixer |
| 2004 | Audioslave | Audioslave | |
| 2004 | Fallen | Evanescence | |
| 2004 | The Long Road | Nickelback | |
| 2004 | More Than You Think You Are | Matchbox Twenty | |
| 2005 | American Idiot | Green Day | Rob Cavallo & Green Day, producers; Chris Lord-Alge & Doug McKean, engineers/mixers |
| 2005 | Contraband | Velvet Revolver | |
| 2005 | The Delivery Man | Elvis Costello and the Imposters | |
| 2005 | Hot Fuss | The Killers | |
| 2005 | The Reason | Hoobastank | |
| 2006 | How to Dismantle an Atomic Bomb | U2 | Steve Lillywhite, producer; Carl Glanville, engineer/mixer |
| 2006 | A Bigger Bang | The Rolling Stones | |
| 2006 | In Your Honor | Foo Fighters | |
| 2006 | Prairie Wind | Neil Young | |
| 2006 | X&Y | Coldplay | |
| 2007 | Stadium Arcadium | Red Hot Chili Peppers | Rick Rubin, producer; Ryan Hewitt, Mark Linett & Andrew Scheps, engineers/mixers |
| 2007 | Broken Boy Soldiers | The Raconteurs | |
| 2007 | Highway Companion | Tom Petty | |
| 2007 | Living with War | Neil Young | |
| 2007 | Try! | John Mayer Trio | |
| 2008 | Echoes, Silence, Patience & Grace | Foo Fighters | Gil Norton, producer: Richard Costey & Adrian Bushby, engineers/mixers |
| 2008 | Daughtry | Daughtry | |
| 2008 | Magic | Bruce Springsteen | |
| 2008 | Revival | John Fogerty | |
| 2008 | Sky Blue Sky | Wilco | |
| 2009 | Viva la Vida or Death and All His Friends | Coldplay | Brian Eno, Rik Simpson & Markus Dravs, producers; Michael H. Brauer, engineer/mixer |
| 2009 | Consolers of the Lonely | The Raconteurs | |
| 2009 | Death Magnetic | Metallica | |
| 2009 | Only by the Night | Kings of Leon | |
| 2009 | Rock n Roll Jesus | Kid Rock | |

=== 2010s ===
| Year | Work | Artist | Winning producer(s)/engineer(s) |
|---|---|---|---|
| 2010 | 21st Century Breakdown | Green Day | Green Day & Butch Vig, producers; Chris Dugan & Chris Lord-Alge, engineers/mixers |
| 2010 | Big Whiskey & the GrooGrux King | Dave Matthews Band | |
| 2010 | Black Ice | AC/DC | |
| 2010 | Live from Madison Square Garden | Eric Clapton and Steve Winwood | |
| 2010 | No Line on the Horizon | U2 | |
| 2011 | The Resistance | Muse | Muse, producers; Adrian Bushby & Mark Stent, engineers/mixers |
| 2011 | Backspacer | Pearl Jam | |
| 2011 | Emotion & Commotion | Jeff Beck | |
| 2011 | Le Noise | Neil Young | |
| 2011 | Mojo | Tom Petty and the Heartbreakers | |
| 2012 | Wasting Light | Foo Fighters | Butch Vig, producer; James Brown & Alan Moulder, engineers/mixers |
| 2012 | Come Around Sundown | Kings of Leon | |
| 2012 | I'm with You | Red Hot Chili Peppers | |
| 2012 | Rock 'n' Roll Party (Honoring Les Paul) | Jeff Beck | |
| 2012 | The Whole Love | Wilco | |
| 2013 | El Camino | The Black Keys | Danger Mouse & The Black Keys (Dan Auerbach & Patrick Carney), producers; Tchad Blake & Kennie Takahashi, engineers/mixers |
| 2013 | The 2nd Law | Muse | |
| 2013 | Blunderbuss | Jack White | |
| 2013 | Mylo Xyloto | Coldplay | |
| 2013 | Wrecking Ball | Bruce Springsteen | |
| 2014 | Celebration Day | Led Zeppelin | Dick Carruthers & Jim Parsons, producers; John Catlin, Alan Moulder & Tim Summerhayes, engineers/mixers |
| 2014 | 13 | Black Sabbath | |
| 2014 | ...Like Clockwork | Queens of the Stone Age | |
| 2014 | Mechanical Bull | Kings of Leon | |
| 2014 | The Next Day | David Bowie | |
| 2014 | Psychedelic Pill | Neil Young with Crazy Horse | |
| 2015 | Morning Phase | Beck | Beck Hansen, producer; Drew Brown, Tom Elmhirst, David Greenbaum, Cole Marsden Greif-Neill, Florian Lagatta, Robbie Nelson, Darrell Thorp, Cassidy Turbin & Joe Visciano, engineers/mixers |
| 2015 | Hypnotic Eye | Tom Petty and the Heartbreakers | |
| 2015 | Ryan Adams | Ryan Adams | |
| 2015 | Songs of Innocence | U2 | |
| 2015 | Turn Blue | The Black Keys | |
| 2016 | Drones | Muse | Robert John "Mutt" Lange & Muse (Matthew Bellamy, Dominic Howard & Chris Wolstenholme), producers; Richard Costey & Tomasso Colliva, engineers/mixers |
| 2016 | .5: The Gray Chapter | Slipknot | |
| 2016 | Chaos and the Calm | James Bay | |
| 2016 | Kintsugi | Death Cab for Cutie | |
| 2016 | Mister Asylum | Highly Suspect | |
| 2017 | Tell Me I'm Pretty | Cage the Elephant | Dan Auerbach, producer; Collin Dupuis & Tom Elmhirst, engineers/mixers |
| 2017 | California | Blink-182 | |
| 2017 | Death of a Bachelor | Panic! at the Disco | |
| 2017 | Magma | Gojira | |
| 2017 | Weezer | Weezer | |
| 2018 | A Deeper Understanding | The War on Drugs | Shawn Everett, engineer/mixer |
| 2018 | Emperor of Sand | Mastodon | |
| 2018 | Hardwired... to Self-Destruct | Metallica | |
| 2018 | The Stories We Tell Ourselves | Nothing More | |
| 2018 | Villains | Queens of the Stone Age | |
| 2019 | From the Fires | Greta Van Fleet | Herschel Boone, Al Sutton & Marlon Young, producers; Al Sutton, engineer/mixer |
| 2019 | Mania | Fall Out Boy | |
| 2019 | Pacific Daydream | Weezer | |
| 2019 | Prequelle | Ghost | |
| 2019 | Rainier Fog | Alice in Chains | |

=== 2020s ===
| Year | Work | Artist | Winning producer(s) and engineer(s) |
|---|---|---|---|
| 2020 | Social Cues | Cage the Elephant | Rob Cohen & John Hill, producers; Rob Cohen, Tom Elmhirst & Jeremy Ferguson, engineers/mixers |
| 2020 | Amo | Bring Me the Horizon | |
| 2020 | Feral Roots | Rival Sons | |
| 2020 | In the End | The Cranberries | |
| 2020 | Trauma | I Prevail | |
| 2021 | The New Abnormal | The Strokes | Rick Rubin, producer; Jason Lader, engineer/mixer |
| 2021 | Daylight | Grace Potter | |
| 2021 | A Hero's Death | Fontaines D.C. | |
| 2021 | Kiwanuka | Michael Kiwanuka | |
| 2021 | Sound & Fury | Sturgill Simpson | |
| 2022 | Medicine at Midnight | Foo Fighters | Foo Fighters & Greg Kurstin, producers; Julian Burg, Greg Kurstin, Alex Pasco, Mark "Spike" Stent & Darrell Thorp, engineer/mixers |
| 2022 | Capitol Cuts – Live from Studio A | Black Pumas | |
| 2022 | McCartney III | Paul McCartney | |
| 2022 | No One Sings Like You Anymore, Vol. 1 | Chris Cornell | |
| 2022 | Power Up | AC/DC | |
| 2023 | Patient Number 9 | Ozzy Osbourne | Andrew Watt (producer); Alan Moulder & Paul LaMalfa (engineers/mixers) |
| 2023 | The Boy Named If | Elvis Costello and the Imposters | |
| 2023 | Crawler | Idles | |
| 2023 | Dropout Boogie | The Black Keys | |
| 2023 | Lucifer on the Sofa | Spoon | |
| 2023 | Mainstream Sellout | Machine Gun Kelly | |
| 2024 | This Is Why | Paramore | Carlos de la Garza, producer; Manny Marroquin & Tam Harriet, engineers/mixers |
| 2024 | 72 Seasons | Metallica | |
| 2024 | But Here We Are | Foo Fighters | |
| 2024 | In Times New Roman... | Queens of the Stone Age | |
| 2024 | Starcatcher | Greta Van Fleet | |
| 2025 | Hackney Diamonds | The Rolling Stones | Andrew Watt (producer); Serban Ghenea, Lars Fox, Paul LaMalfa, Marco Sonzini (engineers/mixers) |
| 2025 | Dark Matter | Pearl Jam | |
| 2025 | Happiness Bastards | The Black Crowes | |
| 2025 | No Name | Jack White | |
| 2025 | Romance | Fontaines D.C. | |
| 2025 | Saviors | Green Day | |
| 2025 | Tangk | Idles | |
| 2026 | Never Enough | Turnstile | Adam Hawkins, Jason Lader & Will Yip (engineers/mixers) |
| 2026 | From Zero | Linkin Park | |
| 2026 | I Quit | Haim | |
| 2026 | Idols | Yungblud | |
| 2026 | Private Music | Deftones | |
| 2027 | Foreign Tongues | The Rolling Stones | Winner TBA on 7 February 2027 |
| 2027 | Frozen Charlotte | Jack White | |
| 2027 | Vol. II | Angine de Poitrine | |
| 2027 | The Wow! Signal | Muse | |
| 2027 | Your Favorite Toy | Foo Fighters | |

== Artists with multiple wins ==
5 wins

- Foo Fighters

2 wins

- Cage the Elephant
- Sheryl Crow
- Green Day
- Muse
- The Rolling Stones
- U2

== Artists with multiple nominations ==
9 nominations

- Foo Fighters

7 nominations

- Neil Young

5 nominations

- The Rolling Stones
- Tom Petty (3 shared with the Heartbreakers)
- U2

4 nominations

- Muse
- Pearl Jam

3 nominations

- The Black Keys
- Bruce Springsteen
- Coldplay
- Crazy Horse
- Dave Matthews Band
- Elvis Costello
- Green Day
- Jack White
- John Fogerty
- Kings of Leon
- Metallica
- Queens of the Stone Age
- Red Hot Chili Peppers
- Sheryl Crow

2 nominations

- AC/DC
- Aerosmith
- Cage the Elephant
- Fontaines D.C.
- Greta Van Fleet
- Idles
- Jeff Beck
- Linkin Park
- Matchbox Twenty
- No Doubt
- The Raconteurs
- Ryan Adams
- Weezer
- Wilco
