= Dancer (Idles song) =

Single by Idles featuring LCD Soundsystem

from the album Tangk
- Released: 19 October 2023
- Genre: Post-punk; dance-punk; disco
- Length: 3:09
- Label: Partisan
- Producers: Nigel Godrich; Kenny Beats; Mark Bowen

Idles singles chronology
"Crawl!" (2022)	"Dancer" (2023)	"Grace" (2023)

LCD Soundsystem singles chronology
"New Body Rhumba" (2022)	"Dancer" (2023)	"X-Ray Eyes" (2024)

"Dancer" is a song by the British rock band Idles, released on October 19, 2023 as the lead single from their album Tangk, released on February 29, 2024. It was their first new music since their 2021 album Crawler, and it features backing vocals from James Murphy and Nancy Whang of LCD Soundsystem.

== Release ==
"Dancer" was first teased with an audio snippet in a YouTube video uploaded to the band's official channel on September 20, 2023, while its title was revealed in another snippet posted to their official Instagram account on October 4. Later Instagram posts on October 6 and October 12 revealed the song's release date and single cover, respectively. On October 19, the song was released along with a music video uploaded to YouTube, as well as an announcement of the album's title and release date. As described by Music Feeds, the music video "[features] the band in mock-ABBA mode, white suits and all [as] they strut towards the camera while the pounding music unfurls around them. [It also shows] a janitor blasting the track through their headphones while they get through a particularly menial shift".

== Reception ==
"Dancer" was met with primarily positive reviews. Rolling Stone described the "raucous" song as showing the band's "trademark post-punk instrumentals mix with [...] a poppier and more melodic chorus", while Hot Press characterized the "playful and scuzzy" track by its "heavy bass, dirty guitar riffs, and joyous vocals". Uproxx praised frontman Joe Talbot's vocals as "[taking] command [reigning] over the dance floor", while American Songwriter commented that the backing vocals from members of LCD Soundsystem "[lend] themselves to a spooky, urgent tone that complements Talbot’s guttural, grungy voice", and also added that "there’s a note of [lyrical] innuendo" Consequence described it as "swampy, spine-tingling, [and] hypnotic", naming it the "song of the week" on October 20 and commenting that "being hip-to-hip and cheek-to-cheek has rarely sounded so visceral".

Regarding its overall style, Medium commented that the song is "[reminiscent] of disco, but with loud guitars instead of funky, electronic beats" and that it shows the band "make an effort to artistic boundaries" as they "put a rhythmic spin on their sound". The comparison to this genre was furthered by Music Feeds' conclusion that "IDLES have entered their disco era – albeit with a great deal of sweat, horror, and aggression laced with something that looks a little like love, if you squint at it sideways".
