= The Crawlers =

The Crawlers may refer to:

- "The Crawlers" (short story), by Philip K. Dick, 1954
- The Crawlers, a 1990 Italian horror film also known as Troll 3
- Crawlers (band), an English rock band from Warrington

== See also ==
- Crawler (disambiguation)
