= Crawl =

Crawl, The Crawl, or crawling may refer to:

== Biology ==
- Crawling, any type of tetrapod quadrupedal locomotion with the torso persistently touching or very close to the ground.
  - Crawling (human), any of several types of human quadrupedal gait
- Limbless locomotion, the movement of limbless animals over the ground
  - Undulatory locomotion, a type of motion characterized by wave-like movement patterns that act to propel an animal forward

== Gaming ==
- Crawl (video game), a 2014 roguelike indie video game
- Dungeon crawl, a type of scenario in fantasy role-playing games
- Linley's Dungeon Crawl or Crawl, a 1997 roguelike computer game
  - Dungeon Crawl Stone Soup, an ongoing open source fork of Linley's Dungeon Crawl

== Music ==
- The Crawl, backing band for Mike Morgan

=== Albums ===
- Crawl (album), by Deen, 2010
- Crawl, by Coffin Break, or the title song, 1991
- Crawl (Entombed EP), 1991
- Crawl (Laughing Hyenas EP), 1992
- The Crawl (Louis Hayes album), 1990
- The Crawl (Mickey Tucker album) or the title song, 1980

=== Songs ===
- "Crawl" (Atlas song), 2007
- "Crawl" (Childish Gambino song), 2014
- "Crawl" (Chris Brown song), 2009
- "Crawl" (Kings of Leon song), 2009
- "Crawling" (song), by Linkin Park, 2001
- "Crawl", by Alkaline Trio from From Here to Infirmary, 2001
- "Crawl", by Anthrax from Worship Music, 2011
- "Crawl", by Bad Omens from Bad Omens, 2016
- "Crawl", by Breaking Benjamin from Dear Agony, 2009
- "Crawl", by Damageplan from New Found Power, 2004
- "Crawl", by Miss May I from Shadows Inside, 2017
- "Crawl", by Norman Iceberg from Person(a), 1987
- "Crawl", by Soul Asylum from Let Your Dim Light Shine, 1995
- "Crawl", by Stabbing Westward from Dead and Gone, 2020
- "Crawl", by Staind from Dysfunction, 1999
- "Crawl", by Thisway, 1999
- "Crawlin'", by Alice Cooper from Constrictor, 1986
- "Crawling", by Bullet for My Valentine from Gravity, 2018
- "Crawling", by Riot from Immortal Soul, 2011
- "The Crawl", by Placebo from Without You I'm Nothing, 1998
- "The Crawl", by Smash Mouth from Summer Girl, 2006

== Television and film ==
- Crawl (2011 film), an Australian horror film
- Crawl (2012 film), a French comedy-drama film
- Crawl (2019 film), an American horror film
- "Crawling" (Teletubbies), a television episode
- "The Crawl" (New Girl), a television episode
- "Chapter One: The Crawl", the season premiere of Stranger Things season 5
- News crawl or news ticker, a moving line of text on a TV screen

== Other uses ==
- Crawl of websites for indexing or archiving purposes, using a web crawler
- Front crawl, a swimming stroke
- Pub crawl, an evening devoted to drinking at a series of pubs
- Driving at a very slow speed
  - Rock crawling, an off-roading sport involving driving sport utility vehicles and trucks up rocky terrains

== See also ==
- Formication, a sensation as if covered with crawling insects
- Star Wars opening crawl, the scrolling text at the beginning of the Star Wars films
- Crawler (disambiguation)
