= Ultra Mono =

2020 studio album by Idles

Studio album by Idles
- Released: 25 September 2020
- Recorded: 2019
- Studios: La Frette (La Frette-sur-Seine, France)
- Genres: Post-punk; punk rock; industrial rock
- Length: 42:52
- Label: Partisan
- Producers: Adam Greenspan; Nick Launay; Mark Bowen

Idles chronology
A Beautiful Thing: Idles Live at le Bataclan (2019)	Ultra Mono (2020)	Crawler (2021)

Singles from Ultra Mono
- 1. "Mr. Motivator" Released: 19 May 2020; 2. "Grounds" Released: 16 June 2020; 3. "A Hymn" Released: 14 July 2020; 4. "Model Village" Released: 11 August 2020; 5. "War" Released: 25 September 2020; 6. "Kill Them With Kindness" Released: 3 December 2020; 7. "Reigns" Released: 12 January 2021

Ultra Mono is the third studio album by British rock band Idles, released on 25 September 2020 by Partisan Records. Following on from their previous album Joy as an Act of Resistance, the album further explores themes established in the band's previous works such as critique of capitalism, revolution, class struggle, mental health and toxic masculinity, as well as the positive and negative aspects of the band's newfound fame.

The record was supported by five singles prior to its release, the first of which was the promotional single "Mr. Motivator", released on 19 May 2020. This was followed by the lead single "Grounds" on 16 June 2020, "A Hymn" on 14 July 2020, "Model Village" on 11 August 2020 and "War" which coincided with the release of the album on 25 September 2020.

== Background and production ==
Following the release and success of their 2018 album Joy as an Act of Resistance, Idles received mainstream attention and toured extensively in support of it. The band confirmed in an Instagram post in January 2019 that they were writing new music and in March, debuted a new song called "War" during an exclusive show for Dr. Martens. Another new song, "Grounds", was debuted in Glasgow during the band's UK tour in December 2019. Both songs were played at the band's final show of the tour at Alexandra Palace alongside another new track called "Danke".

In an interview with DIY following the album's announcement in June 2020, lead singer Joe Talbot opened up about the themes and inspiration behind the album, saying: "Emotionally I'm not healed, I'm healing and that's what's on the record. So this one is about processing and finding pragmatic ways of moving forward, and from your reaction to that trauma, you build something concise and beautiful (...) the songs are all projections of inner workings, I'm not preaching or telling anyone else what to do. I'm showing people what I'm doing to become a better person in the long run – no, not better, but a more productive person."

Ultra Mono was recorded throughout 2019 and the band documented the process, intermittently sharing images of themselves on social media in the studio throughout the year, with one post teasing an appearance from Warren Ellis. In an interview with Zane Lowe in December 2019, Talbot confirmed that they had finished recording the album and that it was being mixed. The band worked with returning Joy producers Nick Launay and Adam 'Atom' Greenspan on the album, with additional programming provided by Kenny Beats and additional guest appearances from Jehnny Beth, David Yow and Jamie Cullum.

== Release and promotion ==
On 19 May 2020, Idles released "Mr. Motivator" as a promotional single from the album. This was preceded by a light-hearted post on the band's Instagram account on 15 May which invited their audience to "get physical with Dev", featuring bassist Adam Devonshire working out and quoting lyrics from the song. In keeping with the announcement's theme, the song's music video featured a montage of fan-submitted workout clips.

On 16 June 2020, Joe Talbot announced Ultra Mono and its release date on Steve Lamacq's Radio 6 show, alongside the premiere of its lead single "Grounds". Following this, the band released a further two singles, "A Hymn" and "Model Village" on 14 July 2020 and 11 August 2020 respectively. A fifth single, "Reigns", was initially scheduled to be released on 8 September. However, a poll was conducted by a member of the band's management in the Facebook fan group, the "AF Gang", asking whether fans wanted to hear the new song or wait for the album. Ultimately, it was decided that the band would not release any more tracks ahead of the album, with the song's music video eventually being released on 12 January 2021.

On 24 August 2020, the band announced an 11 date tour of the UK and Ireland in support of the album, set to take place from May to June 2021. The tour was met with huge demand, resulting in a further 6 dates being added, though these dates were later postponed to January 2022 due to the ongoing COVID-19 pandemic. In addition to this, the band performed three "Lock-In" sets at Abbey Road Studios which were livestreamed on 29 and 30 August 2020, during which they played new material from the upcoming album, as well as songs from previous albums Joy and Brutalism and covers of songs by The Beatles, The Strokes and Ramones. On 21 September 2020, the band announced plans for a tour of intimate instore performances in support of the album across the UK beginning in April 2021, which was later pushed back to September 2021.

Ultra Mono was released on 25 September 2020, accompanied by the music video for "War", the opening track on the album. Following the album's release, "Kill Them With Kindness" was released as a single alongside its music video on 3 December 2020.

== Reception ==
Professional ratings
Aggregate scores
Source	Rating
AnyDecentMusic?	7.6/10
Metacritic	76/100
Review scores
Source	Rating
AllMusic	3/5 stars
Consequence of Sound	B
Exclaim!	7/10
The Guardian	4/5 stars
Louder Than War	10/10
MusicOMH	3/5 stars
NME	4/5 stars
Pitchfork	5.5/10
Q	4/5 stars
Under the Radar	8.5/10

Ultra Mono received generally positive reviews upon release, with Metacritic awarding the album an aggregated score of 76 out of 100 based on 22 reviews, 19 of which were positive.

Louder Than War's John Robb declared Ultra Mono to be "the album of [Idles'] career" in a 10 out of 10 review, praising the album's themes, Launay's production and the band's performances throughout, concluding that "it's a wonderful record. It makes you dance, think, feel wild and gentle, sing and shout and want to change the world whilst embracing everyone you can in a physically socially distanced but mentally very socially attached kind of way." Jordan Bassett of NME was similarly impressed with the album, describing it as "a breakneck ride that roars through sarcasm, defiance, compassion and controversy."

Q's Dorian Lynskey wrote that the album was "the sound of a band becoming ever more defiantly themselves", finding it "more adamantly political" and complimenting its "bludgeoning drums, scowling bass... great, slab like riffs" and the "hysterical urgency" permeating the track listing. Despite finding some of the lyrics to be crude and condescending, Lysnkey eventually stated that the record's "strengths are inseparable from its flaws", concluding that "Idles' brute-force catharsis neither requires nor rewards subtlety... they are they. Take them or leave them." Tom Hull said that while the early comparisons of Idles to The Clash were "ridiculous" as the former lacks "both the early punk fury and the later pop knack", the band nonetheless achieves "a middle line, which supports today's fire and fury."

Writing for AllMusic, Liam Martin was more reserved when appraising the album. Comparing it unfavourably to the band's previous albums, Martin stated that "there is much to enjoy here; their raucous energy shines just as bright, but underneath the surface Ultra Mono lacks the sparkle that made their first two records truly special." Conversely, JR Moores was much less favourable in his review for The Quietus, criticising the lyrics and a perceived misuse of the guest musicians featured on the record, classifying it as a "by-numbers rock plod", before rounding out his review with "three albums in and the hype has died down. The ideas are drying up. The lack of substance is wholly exposed." Jazz Monroe also criticised the album in a review for Pitchfork, claiming "Ultra Mono charges into the discourse like a hobbyist at a rally. It's not listening, just shouting. Not radical but restless. Not bad, just unnecessary."

=== Year-end lists ===
Publications' year-end list appearances for Ultra Mono
Critic/Publication	List	Rank	Ref
Double J	Top 50 Albums of 2020	47	
Consequence of Sound	Top 50 Albums of 2020	25	
Louder Than War	Top 50 Albums of 2020	26	
Mojo	Top 75 Albums of 2020	12	

== Track listing ==
Ultra Mono track listing
No.	Title	Music	Length
1.	"War"	Idles; Colin Webster; David Yow	3:07
2.	"Grounds"	Warren Ellis; Idles; Colin Webster	3:08
3.	"Mr. Motivator"	Idles; Colin Webster	3:16
4.	"Anxiety"	Idles; David Yow	2:59
5.	"Kill Them With Kindness"	Jamie Cullum; Idles; David Yow	3:49
6.	"Model Village"	Idles	3:55
7.	"Ne Touche Pas Moi"	Jehnny Beth; Idles	2:34
8.	"Carcinogenic"	Idles	3:50
9.	"Reigns"	Idles; Colin Webster	4:02
10.	"The Lover"	Idles; David Yow	3:17
11.	"A Hymn"	Idles	5:19
12.	"Danke"	Idles	3:34
Total length:			42:52

== Personnel ==
Credits adapted from liner notes.

Idles

- Joe Talbot – lead vocals
- Adam Devonshire – bass guitar, backing vocals
- Mark Bowen – lead guitar, production
- Jon Beavis – drums
- Lee Kiernan – rhythm guitar

Additional musicians

- Kenny Beats – programming
- Jehnny Beth – vocals (track 7)
- Jamie Cullum – piano (track 5)
- Warren Ellis – backing vocals (track 2)
- Colin Webster – saxophone (tracks 1–3, 9–10)
- David Yow – backing vocals (tracks 1, 4, 5, 10)

Production

- Adam Greenspan – production, engineering, mixing
- Nick Launay – production, engineering, mixing
- Bernie Grundman – mastering

Additional personnel

- Andrew Bourne – logo
- Tom Ham – photography
- Russell Oliver – artwork (painting)
- Nigel Talbot – artwork (sculpture)

== Charts ==
Chart performance for Ultra Mono
Chart (2020)	Peak position
Australian Albums (ARIA)	7
Belgian Albums (Ultratop Flanders)	8
Belgian Albums (Ultratop Wallonia)	15
Dutch Albums (Album Top 100)	18
French Albums (SNEP)	44
German Albums (Offizielle Top 100)	14
Irish Albums (Official Charts)	3
Italian Albums (FIMI)	71
New Zealand Albums (RMNZ)	15
Portuguese Albums (AFP)	12
Spanish Albums (PROMUSICAE)	22
Swiss Albums (Schweizer Hitparade)	21
UK Albums (Official Charts)	1
US Billboard 200	54
US Top Rock Albums (Billboard)	6

== Certifications ==
Region	Certification	Certified units/sales
United Kingdom (BPI)	Silver	60,000^{‡}
^{‡} Sales+streaming figures based on certification alone.
