= Crawler =

Crawler may refer to:

== Biology ==
- "Crawler", a first-instar nymph of a scale insect that has legs and walks around before it attaches itself and becomes stationary

== Computing and technology ==
- Bottom crawler, an underwater exploration and recovery vehicle
- Crawler (BEAM), a type of robot
- A type of crane on tracks
- Pipe crawler, a machine used to inspect pipelines
- Web crawler, a computer program that gathers and categorizes information on the World Wide Web

== Film ==
- Crawlers (film), a 2026 horror film
- A fictional creature in the film The Descent

== Music ==
- Crawler (album), an album by IDLES
- Crawler (band), a British rock band
- Crawlers (band), a British rock band

== Television ==
- "Crawlers" (Into the Dark), an episode of the second season of Into the Dark
- The Crawler, an episode of the cartoon Extreme Ghostbusters

== Video games ==
- A fictional creature in the video game Fable III

== See also ==
- Crawler-transporter, a large tracked vehicle used by NASA to transport spacecraft
- "Nightcrawler" (Lumbricus terrestris), an annelid worm also called "common earthworm" and "dew worm"
- Crawley
- Crawl (disambiguation)
