= X-Ray Eyes =

Single by LCD Soundsystem
- Released: November 1, 2024
- Genre: Dance-punk
- Length: 4:54
- Label: Columbia
- Songwriters: Al Doyle; James Murphy; Nancy Whang
- Producer: James Murphy

LCD Soundsystem singles chronology
"Dancer" (2023)	"X-Ray Eyes" (2024)

"X-Ray Eyes" is a song by American rock band LCD Soundsystem. It was officially released on November 1, 2024, after debuting the previous month on the NTS Radio show Soup to Nuts w/ Anu. It is expected to be included on the untitled upcoming fifth studio album by the band.
