= Meat (EP) =

EP by Idles
- Released: 30 October 2015
- Recorded: Summer 2015
- Genre: Hardcore punk; post-punk; pub rock
- Length: 12:44
- Label: Balley

Idles chronology
Welcome (2012)	Meat (2015)	Meta (2015)

Singles from Meat
- 1. "Queens" Released: 25 September 2014

Meat is the second extended play by British rock band Idles. The extended play was released on 30 October 2015. The three-year gap between the EP and the previous release Welcome is, to date, the longest gap between two releases by the band.

The four track EP has been described as a departure of the band's original post-punk sound and an embracement of a more pub rock and punk-oriented sound. The orchestration of the band's first two albums, Brutalism and Joy as an Act of Resistance have been linked to the sound of Meat.

== Background ==
In September 2014, the second track off the EP, "The Idles Chant", was premiered on BBC's Introducing the West session series. The track has been described as a departure from the band's original post-punk roots and contains a more pub rock and punk rock tone.

The first single off the EP, Queens was released a year prior to the EP release. The music video features a naked man wearing a wrestling mask while eating a bowl of hard boiled eggs. The staff of Crack described the music video as "confusing and disturbing". Laurence Day of The Line of Best Fit found the video to be entertaining and the track to be a more punk-oriented track compared to their work on Welcome. In a retrospective review, The Fat Angel Sings described the track as a cornerstone for Idles as a "brutal entity".

After touring in Spring 2015, the band re-recorded the tracks for their EP, which was announced on 2 October 2015. In describing the EP and its name, lead singer Joe Talbot said "we are lumps of imperfect meat".

In describing the album in contrast to Welcome, Talbot said in an interview with The Line of Best Fit that the members of IDLES are "better friends. Our music is more accomplished; in that we're more succinct with our message and sound, plus Bowen's not around to fuck around with pedals as he lives in London now. In short: we're much better and a shit-tonne heavier on record and live."

== Track listing ==
No.	Title	Length
1.	"Queens"	3:01
2.	"The Idles Chant"	3:03
3.	"Romantic Gestures"	2:55
4.	"Nice Man"	3:45
Total length:		12:44
