= The Pasties =

The Pasties were a New York City-based power pop band that featured Sam Endicott, who went on to form The Bravery. The Pasties had music featured on MTV's The Real World and Road Rules, and their song "Happy 4R Friends" ended the Gauntlet season of the show. The band also included members Mike Jacobs and Devon Copley, who went on to form Evil Jake and The Animators, respectively.

The band was originally formed in New York City in 2000 by Copley, with Endicott on bass, Jacobs on guitar, and Joe Costello on drums. They released their debut CD Platonica in 2001, produced by Copley and Eric Casimiro, who eventually replaced Jacobs on guitar. Reviewing the album, Allmusic said "Throughout Platonica, the Pasties demonstrate that they have good guitar pop instincts", identifying Matthew Sweet and Elvis Costello as influences. In 2002, Copley disbanded the band to form the Animators with Alex Wong of the Din Petals (Epic Records).

== Discography ==
- Platonica (2001)
