= Darrell Thorp =

American audio engineer

Darrell Thorp is an American recording engineer, mixing engineer, and music producer. He is known for his work on albums by Foo Fighters, Beck, Radiohead, and Paul McCartney. Thorp has received nine Grammy Awards, including a win for Best Rock Album for Foo Fighters' Medicine at Midnight at the 64th Annual Grammy Awards.

== Early life and education ==
Thorp first developed an interest in music as a guitar player. He served four years in the United States Navy before pursuing a career in audio engineering. After his military service, he enrolled at the Conservatory of Recording Arts and Sciences in Arizona.

== Career ==
In 1997, Thorp moved to Los Angeles and began working as a runner and assistant engineer at major recording studios, including Track Record, Conway Recording Studios, and Ocean Way Recording. He gained hands-on experience during a period when commercial studios often supported extended sessions and larger budgets.

Thorp has frequently collaborated with producer Nigel Godrich. His engineering credits include Beck's Sea Change, Radiohead's Hail to the Thief, and Paul McCartney's Chaos and Creation in the Backyard. He also served as the lead recording and mixing engineer for the From the Basement live performance series featuring artists such as Radiohead, Beck, The White Stripes, and Foster the People.

In interviews, Thorp has discussed the challenges of beginning as an assistant engineer, the importance of work ethic, and continuous learning. He has spoken about his approach to engineering Beck's album Colors and the value he has placed on education throughout his career.

Thorp operates his own studio, 101 Recording, in Los Angeles, using a hybrid analog/digital workflow built around an API console. His discography includes engineering and mixing contributions to Foo Fighters' Concrete and Gold and Medicine at Midnight, as well as Beck's Morning Phase and Colors.

He has worked with additional artists including OutKast, Switchfoot, Molotov, P!nk, Jay-Z, and Goo Goo Dolls, and has conducted masterclasses and mentoring sessions on recording and mixing techniques.

== Awards and recognition ==
Thorp has received nine Grammy Awards for his engineering and mixing work. One documented win is Best Rock Album for Foo Fighters' Medicine at Midnight at the 64th Annual Grammy Awards. He has also received three TEC Awards and an Emmy nomination for his audio engineering contributions to the Taylor Hawkins Tribute Concert.

== Personal life ==
Thorp is a sponsored remote-controlled helicopter pilot with the BK Hobbies Flight Team.

== Selected discography ==
- Beck – Sea Change, Morning Phase, Colors
- Foo Fighters – Concrete and Gold, Medicine at Midnight
- Radiohead – Hail to the Thief
- Paul McCartney – Chaos and Creation in the Backyard
- Various artists – From the Basement series
