= Tangk =

Studio album by Idles
- Released: 15 February 2024
- Genre: Art rock; art punk; dance-punk
- Length: 40:06
- Label: Partisan
- Producer: Mark Bowen; Nigel Godrich; Kenny Beats

Idles chronology
Crawler (2021)	Tangk (2024)

Singles from Tangk
- 1. "Dancer" Released: 19 October 2023; 2. "Grace" Released: 7 December 2023; 3. "Gift Horse" Released: 15 January 2024

Tangk is the fifth studio album by the British rock band Idles, released on 15 February 2024 through Partisan Records. It was produced by Nigel Godrich, Kenny Beats and the Idles member Mark Bowen. It was promoted with the singles "Dancer", "Grace" and "Gift Horse". It received positive reviews and was nominated at the 67th Annual Grammy Awards for Best Rock Album.

== Background and recording ==
The vocalist, Joe Talbot, said that he "needed love" so he "made it. [He] gave love out to the world and it feels like magic. This is our album of gratitude and power. All love songs. All is love." Talbot said that he wanted to "make people dance" and "feel the love that [he] need[s] in life", as well as wanting to make the music "infectious in a way that makes people feel, not think" and be "part of something electric again".

Tangk was Idles' first work with a major producer, Nigel Godrich, who is known for his work with Radiohead. The band members saw Godrich as among "the upper echelon" and had assumed they would never be able to create something of his calibre. However, Bowen said: "What we learned is that it's not that difficult to attain if you put work into it. We learned that there are no geniuses." Bowen said Godrich taught him how to use tape loops, distortion and delay in new ways to create textures. James Murphy and Nancy Whang of LCD Soundsystem contributed additional vocals on "Dancer".

== Release ==
The album was announced following the band's surprise show at the Village Underground in London on 17 October 2023. It was promoted with the singles "Dancer", "Grace" and "Gift Horse". The Tangk world tour started on 29 February 2024 in Porto, and ended on 7 December 2024 at the O2 Apollo Manchester, England.

== Critical reception ==
Professional ratings
Aggregate scores
Source	Rating
AnyDecentMusic?	7.6/10
Metacritic	78/100
Review scores
Source	Rating
AllMusic	3/5 stars
Classic Rock	4/5 stars
Kerrang!	4/5
The Line of Best Fit	8/10
Mojo	4/5 stars
Pitchfork	6.7/10
Record Collector	4/5 stars
The Skinny	4/5 stars
NME	4/5 stars
Uncut	8/10

Tangk has a score of 78 out of 100 on the review aggregator Metacritic, based on 25 critics' reviews, indicating "generally favorable" reception. Uncut stated that "Tangk is more about diverse, swooning sonic details that support troubled singer Joe Talbot's redemption", while Classic Rock felt that "despite its subject matter, the Bristol tykes are still sonically and vocally as visceral as ever". Mojo's Andrew Perry concluded that the album is "still hardly for the faint-hearted pop-picker, but it categorically repositions its makers as contenders in the biggest arena, as tuneful, approachable geezers capable of love, and sharing it with the world".

Andrew Trendell of NME praised Tangk as "an adventure into pastures new" in a four star review, noting that "Talbot is keen to put arm’s length at the material that exorcises his past traumas and battles with addiction and general frustration at the modern malaise". Jamie Wilde of The Skinny summarised the album as "a raucous expression of love" as well as "raw, vulnerable and inimitably Idles". Record Collector's Elizabeth Aubrey wrote that Tangk "may bring us a more compassionate, empathetic version of the band who seem to be trying to find something that resembles peace after years of tumult" but that "they still haven't quite lost their punk spirit".

Nick Seip of Slant Magazine stated that "those familiar with Idles's past work may be surprised to find much of their characteristic righteous anger missing here" and their "slower songs struggle to command such attention" but "on a technical level, Tangk underpins its more personal and emotional lyrics with rich, layered arrangements". Pitchfork's Arielle Gordon wrote that "Idles seem poised to let down their ironclad armor and reveal a far more interesting and nuanced band, just as soon as Talbot is ready to relinquish his stubborn and self-defeating grasp".

=== Year-end lists ===
Select year-end rankings for Tangk
Publication/critic	Accolade	Rank	Ref.
Rough Trade UK	Albums of the Year 2024	6	
Uncut	80 Best Albums of 2024	61	

== Track listing ==
All lyrics are written by Joseph Talbot; all music is composed by Jonathan Beavis, Mark Bowen, Adam Devonshire, Lee Kiernan, and Joseph Talbot.

Tangk track listing
No.	Title	Length
1.	"Idea 01"	3:38
2.	"Gift Horse"	4:09
3.	"Pop Pop Pop"	4:16
4.	"Roy"	4:09
5.	"A Gospel"	3:45
6.	"Dancer" (featuring LCD Soundsystem)	3:09
7.	"Grace"	3:53
8.	"Hall & Oates"	2:23
9.	"Jungle"	4:11
10.	"Gratitude"	3:41
11.	"Monolith"	2:52
Total length:		40:06

== Personnel ==
Idles

- Jon Beavis – drums, backing vocals
- Mark Bowen – lead guitar, electronics, keyboards, programming, design, backing vocals, production
- Adam Devonshire – bass guitar, backing vocals
- Lee Kiernan – rhythm guitar, backing vocals
- Joe Talbot – lead vocals, artwork, design

Additional musicians

- Colin Webster – saxophone
- Aaron Paris – strings, string arrangement
- James Murphy – additional vocals ("Dancer")
- Nancy Whang – additional vocals ("Dancer")

Technical

- Kenny Beats – production
- Nigel Godrich – production, mixing
- Mikko Gordon – engineering (all tracks), additional production ("Monolith")
- Robert C. Ludwig – mastering
- Korey Richey – engineering for LCD Soundsystem ("Dancer")
- Maurice Talbot – engineering assistance
- Daniel Cayotta – engineering assistance

Visuals

- Joshua Hughes-Games – artwork, design
- Aris Chatman – centerfold photography
- Tom Ham – lyric + photo book, 'Dancer' and 'Hall & Oates' Photography
- Cassidy Rose Hill – costume design

== Charts ==
Chart performance for Tangk
Chart (2024)	Peak position
Australian Albums (ARIA)	18
Belgian Albums (Ultratop Flanders)	2
Belgian Albums (Ultratop Wallonia)	11
Dutch Albums (Album Top 100)	13
German Albums (Offizielle Top 100)	2
Hungarian Physical Albums (MAHASZ)	36
Irish Albums (OCC)	7
Italian Albums (FIMI)	20
New Zealand Albums (RMNZ)	10
Polish Albums (ZPAV)	57
Portuguese Albums (AFP)	20
Scottish Albums (OCC)	1
Spanish Albums (Promusicae)	23
Swiss Albums (Schweizer Hitparade)	8
UK Albums (OCC)	1
UK Independent Albums (OCC)	1
US Billboard 200	132
US Top Album Sales (Billboard)	10
US Top Alternative Albums (Billboard)	12
US Top Rock Albums (Billboard)	21
US Vinyl Albums (Billboard)	3
