= Thisway =

American Indie pop band from New York

- Origin: Brooklyn, New York City, US
- Genres: Indie pop, alternative rock
- Years active: 1997–2003
- Labels: Reprise (1999–2001)
- Past members: Brandon Wilde; Chris Foley; Andy LaDue; Len Monachello

Thisway was an American Indie pop band from Brooklyn, New York. They released their self-titled debut LP in early 1999. The band is most notable for their single "Crawl", which was used for The WB Television Network promos and television shows most notably being used for The WB's Night of Favorites and Farewells event.

== History ==
Thisway was formed by singer Brandon Wilde and guitarist Chris Foley in 1997. Drummer Andy LaDue joined the band in time to record the group's first demo. Bassist Len Monachello soon joined thereafter to complete the band's line-up. After generating a buzz on the New York Club scene, Thisway signed to Reprise Records, issuing their self-titled debut LP in May 1999.

After experiencing commercial success due to the WB affiliation, Thisway was dropped from the Reprise label soon after the September 11th attacks. The band stuck it out and carried on independently before officially calling it quits in 2003. During the height of their popularity, Thisway toured with such musical acts as the Barenaked Ladies, Red Hot Chili Peppers, Train and Lit.

== Members ==
- Brandon Wilde – Vocals
- Chris Foley – Guitars
- Len Monachello – Bass
- Andy LaDue – Drums

== Discography ==
Albums

- Thisway (1999)

Singles

- "Crawl" (1999)
