= Idles =

English post-punk band

IDLES
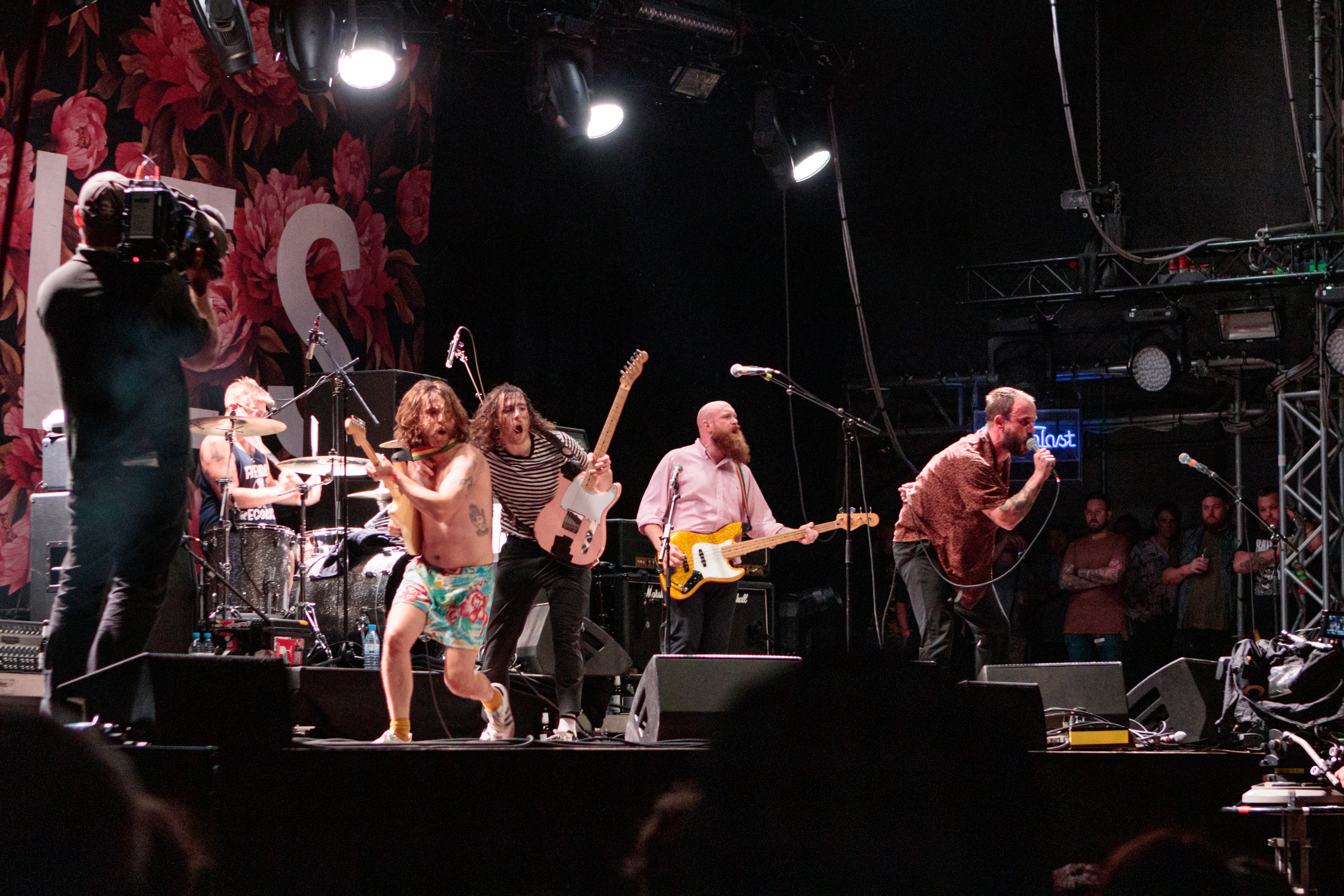
- IDLES performing in August 2019. From left: Jon Beavis, Mark Bowen, Lee Kiernan, Adam Devonshire and Joe Talbot

Background information
- Origin: Bristol, England
- Genres: Post-punk; crank wave; punk rock; post-hardcore; hardcore punk; art rock
- Years active: 2009–present
- Labels: Fear of Fiction; Balley; Partisan
- Members: Adam Devonshire; Joe Talbot; Mark Bowen; Lee Kiernan; Jon Beavis
- Past members: Jon Harper; Andy Stewart
- Website: idlesband.com

IDLES are a British post-punk band formed in Bristol in 2009. The band consists of Adam Devonshire (bass), Joe Talbot (vocals), Mark Bowen (guitar), Lee Kiernan (guitar), and Jon Beavis (drums).

After spending eight years honing their live performances, the band released their debut album, Brutalism, in 2017 to critical acclaim. Their second album, Joy as an Act of Resistance (2018), increased their exposure significantly, and was followed by their first UK number one album, Ultra Mono, in 2020.

The band released their fourth album, Crawler, in 2021. Tangk, their fifth studio album, was released in 2024 and became their second to reach number one in the UK. In 2025, the band provided the film score to Darren Aronofsky's feature film, Caught Stealing.

== History ==
=== 2009–2015: Formation, Welcome and Meat/Meta EPs ===
Welsh frontman Joe Talbot was born in Newport and spent his late teenage years in Devon. Talbot and bassist Adam Devonshire met in sixth form college in Exeter. Talbot and Devonshire then both moved to Bristol where they studied at the St Matthias Campus of the University of the West of England and decided to start a band. According to Talbot, "It took us a long time to get productive because we didn't know what the fuck we were doing at all, we were fucking terrible for a long time." Talbot and Devonshire went on to open the Bat-Cave Night Club in Bristol. Guitarist Mark Bowen moved from Belfast to study in Bristol and met Talbot while on the DJ circuit.

The band's first release was the Welcome EP in 2012. By 2014 the band comprised Talbot, Devonshire, guitarists Mark Bowen and Andy Stewart, and drummer Jon Beavis. They released a second EP, Meat, which saw them embrace a much harder-edged direction from their early work, and Meta, an EP of remixes, in 2015, and then started writing songs for their debut album. Also in 2015, guitarist Andy Stewart was replaced by Lee Kiernan.

=== 2016–2017: Brutalism ===
After the 2016 singles "Well Done" and "Divide & Conquer", the band released their first album, Brutalism, in March 2017 to critical acclaim. DIY gave it 4 stars, calling it "An exhilarating escape along frenzied rhythms and powerhouse rhythms with a ferocious commentary for guidance...as vital as it is volatile." The Line of Best Fit website gave it 9/10, calling Idles "one of the most exciting British bands right now". It received an 8/10 from PopMatters, with Ian King calling it "bracing, caustic, and relentless". Uncut gave it a similarly positive review, calling it "A rare rock record with the rage, urgency, wit and shattering of complacency usually found in grime". Talbot's mother died after a long illness while the band was working on the album and is pictured on the cover, along with a sculpture by Talbot and his father. Her death gave Talbot and the band a new focus. They toured to support Brutalism, and supported the Maccabees on the London shows of their farewell tour, as well as supporting the Foo Fighters for the O2 Arena's 10th Birthday.

=== 2018–2019: Joy as an Act of Resistance ===
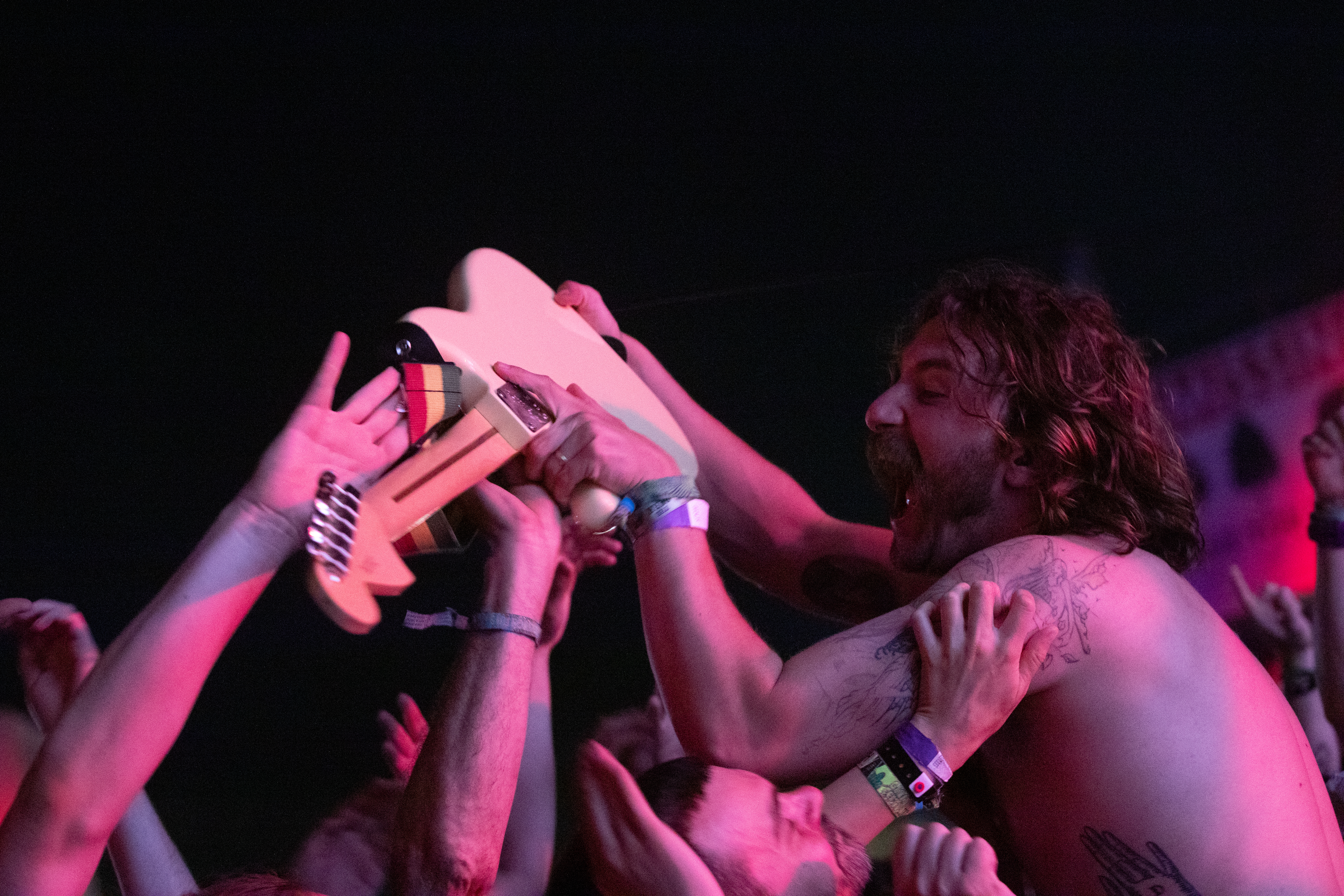
Guitarist Mark Bowen at Glastonbury Festival 2019

After several festival appearances throughout Europe, they began working on their second album, Joy as an Act of Resistance, which was released on 31 August 2018. Accompanying the release of Joy, the group created an exhibition in collaboration with HM Electric Gallery in London, taking place 30 and 31 August 2018.

In 2019, the band was nominated for Best Breakthrough Act at the 2019 Brit Awards and later won the 2019 Kerrang! Award for Best British Breakthrough Act. That same year, Joy as an Act of Resistance was shortlisted for the 2019 Hyundai Mercury Prize. The band performed "Never Fight a Man with a Perm" at the ceremony on 19 September. In December, they played various shows across the UK, including a packed concert of 10,000 at London's Alexandra Palace.

=== 2020–2021: Ultra Mono ===
During the latter stages of their Joy as an Act of Resistance tour in December 2019, Idles performed three new songs which were confirmed to be from their then-unannounced third album, which Talbot confirmed was finished and being mixed in an interview with Zane Lowe that same month.

Following the promotional single "Mr. Motivator" in May 2020, Talbot announced their third album, Ultra Mono, in June, on Steve Lamacq's Radio 6 show. The album was supported by a further four singles; "Grounds", "A Hymn", "Model Village" and "War" in June, July, August and September 2020, respectively. The record also features guest appearances from Jehnny Beth, Warren Ellis, David Yow and Jamie Cullum. In 2020, Idles received two nominations at the Berlin Music Video Awards: the music video "Never Fight a Man With a Perm" received a nomination for Best Animation and "Mercedes Marxist" was nominated for Best Concept.

Ultra Mono was released through Partisan Records on 25 September 2020 to predominantly positive reviews, with Louder Than War awarding it a 10 out of 10 and describing it as "the album of their career". The band followed the release of the album with a remix of "Model Village", featuring Slowthai.

In 2021 the band received the Best Punk Record award for the album at the American Association of Independent Music's (A2IM) Libera Awards. Also in 2021, the band released three covers: Sharon Van Etten's "Peace Signs" (for Van Etten's commemorative Epic Ten album), Gang of Four's "Damaged Goods" (for the Andy Gill tribute album The Problem Of Leisure) and Metallica's "The God That Failed" (for the charity tribute album The Metallica Blacklist).

=== 2021–2023: Crawler ===
On 28 September 2021, shortly over a year after the release of Ultra Mono, the band released the single "The Beachland Ballroom". Coinciding with the announcement the band announced the release of their fourth studio album, Crawler, to be released later in the autumn. Prior to the album's release, the second single, "Car Crash", was released. The song was written about Talbot's real-life car accident.

Crawler was released on 12 November 2021 through Partisan Records, and it was met with critical acclaim. Matt Mitchell, writing for Paste, gave the album an 8.8 out of 10 saying that Crawler "is magnetic storytelling tempered with newfound patience". Damien Morris, of The Observer, called Crawler a "thrilling, glass-gargling introspection", giving the album a full five out of five stars. Stuart Berman of Pitchfork gave Crawler a 7 out 10, the highest rating the band has received from the website. Berman said that "the Bristol band's fourth album plays like the dark origin story for how Idles became the preeminent life coaches of modern post-punk."

After being unable to tour for Ultra Mono due to the COVID-19 pandemic, the two albums were promoted in a worldwide tour from late 2021 to late 2022. During the tour, the band released two music videos from Crawler. The first, "When the Lights Come On", premiered on 13 December 2021 with direction from the company, Holding Hands with Horses. On 8 February 2022, the music video for "Crawl!" was released. The video was a claymation video directed by LOOSE and Edie Lawrence.

In April 2022, the band performed at Coachella Music and Arts Festival, with Desert Sun describing their performance as "rambunctious" and "chaotic".

=== 2023–2025: Tangk and scoring Caught Stealing ===
On 18 October 2023 the band released the single "Dancer", featuring backing vocals by James Murphy and Nancy Whang from LCD Soundsystem. They also announced their fifth album Tangk, which was released on 16 February 2024 and co-produced by the team of Kenny Beats, Nigel Godrich and guitarist Mark Bowen. "Dancer" was later named by NME as the 49th best song of 2023.

On 6 December 2023, the band released the follow-up single "Grace", and later released "Gift Horse" on 14 January 2024. On 14 February the band released a music video for "Grace" that used footage from Coldplay's video for "Yellow". Using deep fake technology, Chris Martin is made to appear as though he is singing "Grace" rather than "Yellow". The idea for the video reportedly came to Talbot in a dream, and was done with not only Martin's approval but his cooperation – filming himself singing the song in order to train the AI to make it appear more realistic.

On 17 April 2024, the band released a music video for "Pop Pop Pop" while on a worldwide tour that started in February 2024. The music video was shot on location in Iceland.

On Friday 28 June 2024 Idles played at Glastonbury where they were the final act performing on the 'Other Stage'. At one point during the performance they were joined on stage by American rapper Danny Brown. The band toured the album extensively throughout 2024 and 2025, culminating in two hometown shows at Queen Square, Bristol on 1 and 2 August 2025.

During this time, the band recorded the film score for Darren Aronofsky's 2025 feature film, Caught Stealing, with an accompanying soundtrack album scheduled for release on 29 August 2025. Alongside the score, the band recorded four new songs for the soundtrack. Reflecting on the experience, Joe Talbot noted: "This has been a huge opportunity for us that seemingly came about after a chance meeting backstage at Fallon when we both happened to be guests on the same day. But in hindsight, I realise that Darren is one of my favourite directors and his films have in some ways made me who I am as an artist. This lucid dream has been a lifetime in the making and one that I will live over and over with a huge sense of humility and joy." Aronofsky elaborated: "I built Caught Stealing to be a roller coaster of fun and wanted to supercharge the film by main lining a punk sensibility. I don't think a band has really been tasked with performing a score for a movie. Who better to collaborate with than IDLES? It has been a dream watching them bend their notes to blast a hole in our movie screen."

=== 2025–present: Sixth studio album and collaborations ===
In July 2025, Joe Talbot confirmed that the band are recording their sixth studio album with producers Nigel Godrich and Kenny Beats, who had both previously worked with the band on Tangk (2024). Talking to NME, Talbot noted: "We've recorded a bunch of songs. We've got like ten songs and we're going to go back and do a bunch more. We're doing some other projects in between, but we're going to come back to the album later in the year and get it finished. We're recording with Kenny [Beats] and Nigel [Godrich] again. It's really magic, I can't wait. [...] This album is more driven. That's all I can say, really. There's more [of] a drive to it."

In September 2025, it was announced that the band would feature as guest collaborators on the Gorillaz album The Mountain, on the song "The God of Lying." Bowen also worked as a co-producer and co-writer of Florence and the Machine's sixth studio album Everybody Scream, which was released on 31 October 2025.

In May 2026, Bowen gave an update on the band's sixth studio album, stating: "It is probably the most exciting Idles album, just from a perspective of how excited we are about it. We got back in the studio to write, and we've kinda gone – I don't want to say back to basics because that's cliche – but it's a bit back to basics! It's five members in a room thrashing it out on instruments. Lots of arguments, [which is great because] if it's too nice, then it's not sick. It's always more sick if someone is not getting what they want!" Bowen went on to state that the album is yet to be recorded and that it will most likely be released in 2027.

== Musical style ==
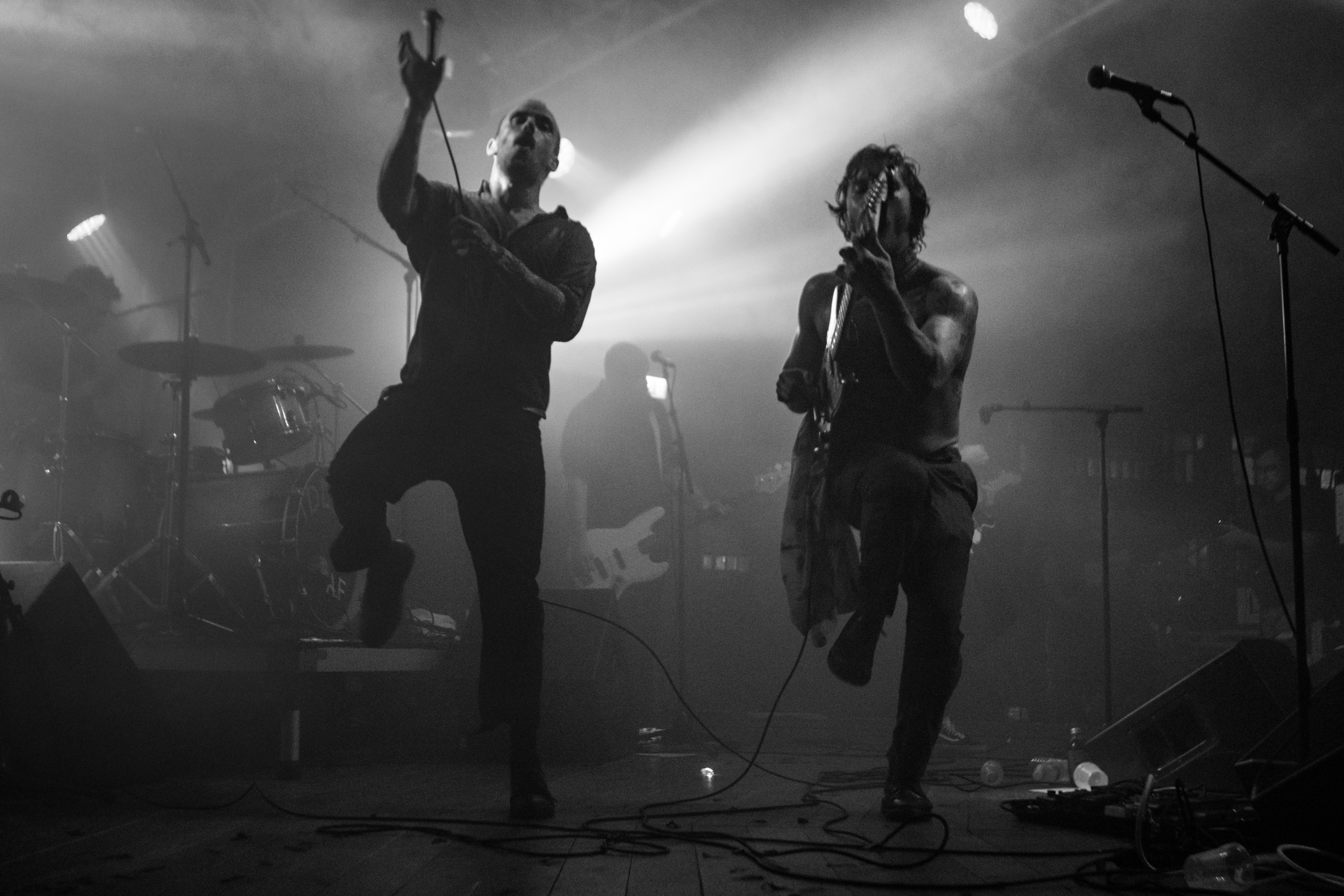
Idles at Haldern Pop Festival 2017

Idles' music has been described as post-punk, punk rock, crank wave, post-hardcore, hardcore punk, and art rock. Talbot rejected the punk label; in 2017, he said: "We're not a post punk band. I guess we have that motorik, engine-like drive in the rhythm section that some post punk bands have, but we have plenty of songs that aren't like that at all."

Idles have cited influences including Gilla Band, Mclusky, Interpol, Sex Pistols, Iceage, Metz, Suuns, Protomartyr, Holograms, Gang of Four, Joy Division, Bauhaus, Kanye West, the Walkmen and Bloc Party.

They have been cited as an influence by Ditz and Return to Dust.

== Political activism ==
Idles have been described as a "post-Brexit" political rock band. Their songs include political messages on a diverse range of topics including feminism, mass media and immigration. British newspaper The Guardian wrote in 2024 that "the subjects the band sparred with along the way ranged from white privilege to Brexit to immigration to class, with a special wallop reserved for the crueler aspects of traditional masculinity".

English punk duo Bob Vylan criticised Idles in June 2020, accusing them of neglecting to comment on the murder of George Floyd, and alleged that this was for commercial reasons. Idles responded by saying that they took time to comment on the murder of Floyd because "there was a lot of virtue-signalling and we wanted to make sure that anything we contributed was going to be [helpful]". Bob Vylan, who have had previous experience with controversial subjects, again criticised the band a month into the Gaza war for not speaking about the Palestinian cause despite being left-wing. Subsequently, Joe Talbot voiced support for Palestinians at the launch show for the album Tangk, by changing lyrics to include references to Palestine, while guitarist Mark Bowen led chants of "ceasefire now". The band have continued to speak about the topic, including during their set at the 2024 Glastonbury Festival.

== Members ==
Current

- Adam Devonshire – bass guitar, backing vocals (2009–present)
- Joe Talbot – lead vocals (2009–present)
- Mark Bowen – lead guitar, backing vocals (2009–present), electronics, keyboards (2021–present)
- Jon Beavis – drums, backing vocals (2011–present)
- Lee Kiernan – rhythm guitar, backing vocals (2015–present)

Former

- Andy Stewart – rhythm guitar, backing vocals (2009–2015)
- Jon Harper – drums (2009–2011)

Former touring musicians

- Tina Maynard – rhythm guitar (2021), lead guitar, keyboards, backing vocals (2022; substitute for Mark Bowen)
- Thomas "Tank" Barclay – bass guitar (2025; substitute for Adam Devonshire)

Timeline

== Discography ==
- Brutalism (2017)
- Joy as an Act of Resistance (2018)
- Ultra Mono (2020)
- Crawler (2021)
- Tangk (2024)

== Awards and nominations ==
Award	Year	Category	Nominated work	Result	Ref.
AIM Independent Music Awards	2022	Best Live Performer	Themselves	Nominated	
Brit Awards	2019	British Breakthrough Act	Themselves	Nominated	
Berlin Music Video Awards	2020	Best Concept	"Mercedes Marxist"	Nominated	
Berlin Music Video Awards	2020	BEST ANIMATION	"Never Fight a Man with a Perm"	Nominated	
Berlin Music Video Awards	2021	Best Editor	"War"	Nominated	
Berlin Music Video Awards	2024	Best Trashy	Gift Horse	Nominated	
Grammy Awards	2023	Best Rock Performance	"Crawl!"	Nominated	
Grammy Awards	2023	Best Rock Album	Crawler	Nominated	
Grammy Awards	2025	Best Rock Performance	"Gift Horse"	Nominated	
Grammy Awards	2025	Best Rock Song	"Gift Horse"	Nominated	
Grammy Awards	2025	Best Rock Album	Tangk	Nominated	
Ivor Novello Awards	2019	Album Award	Joy as an Act of Resistance	Won	
Kerrang! Awards	2019	Best British Breakthrough	Themselves	Won	
Libera Awards	2020	Best Live Act	Themselves	Won	
Libera Awards	2021	Best Punk Record	Ultra Mono	Won	
Libera Awards	2021	Best Creative Packaging	Ultra Mono	Nominated	
Libera Awards	2022	Best Rock Record	Crawler	Won	
Libera Awards	2022	Video of the Year	"Car Crash"	Nominated	
Libera Awards	2023	Best Live/Livestream Act	Live on From the Basement	Nominated	
Libera Awards	2024	Music Video of the Year	"Dancer"	Won	
Libera Awards	2024	Best Short-Form Video	"Grace" teaser	Won	
Mercury Prize	2019	Best Album	Joy as an Act of Resistance	Nominated	
NME Awards	2020	Best British Band	Themselves	Nominated	
NME Awards	2020	Best Band in the World	Themselves	Nominated	
NME Awards	2022	Best Live Act	Themselves	Nominated	
Q Awards	2018	Best Breakthrough Act	Themselves	Won	
Q Awards	2018	Best Album	Joy as an Act of Resistance	Nominated	
UK Music Video Awards	2020	Best Rock Video – UK	"War"	Won	
UK Music Video Awards	2020	Best Cinematography in a Video	"War"	Nominated	
UK Music Video Awards	2020	Best Editing in a Video	"War"	Nominated	
UK Music Video Awards	2022	Best Rock Video - UK	"Crawl!"	Nominated	
UK Music Video Awards	2022	Best Animation in a Video	"Crawl!"	Nominated	
UK Music Video Awards	2024	Best Rock Video – UK	"Dancer"	Nominated	
UK Music Video Awards	2024	Best Rock Video – UK	"Gift Horse"	Won	
