= Brutalism (Idles album) =

Studio album by Idles
- Released: 10 March 2017
- Recorded: 2015–2016
- Genres: Hardcore punk; punk rock; pub rock
- Length: 41:56
- Label: Partisan/Balley
- Producer: Space

Idles chronology
Meat (2015)	Brutalism (2017)	Joy as an Act of Resistance (2018)

Brutalism is the debut studio album by British rock band Idles, released in March 2017.

== Background and recording ==
The band started recording the album in 2015. Singer Joe Talbot's mother (who is pictured on the album cover along with a sculpture by Talbot and his father) died during the recording of the album after a long illness, and his time caring for her, and her death, had a major impact on the album, with Talbot later stating "She was that album. That's why she was on the cover." Talbot added lyrics after the music had been written by the rest of the band. He stated the songs on the album are "to do with the roles of women in my life. It's also to do with the role my mum played pre and postmortem and also about progression and grief as a theme and eventual rebuilding". The band recorded the album largely live in the studio, with each song recorded three times at most in order to keep a raw and urgent feel to them. It was produced by Space.

"Stendhal Syndrome", which ironically mocked lowbrow art critics despite being named after a condition involving panic from experiencing beautiful art, was made available for download before the album's release, as were three tracks from the album that were later released as physical singles; "Mother", which dealt with "impotent male rage" and Talbot's feminism, "Divide & Conquer", about the state of the NHS, and "Well Done", which dealt with the class system.

A limited edition of 100 LPs were released in October 2017 with Talbot's mother's ashes pressed into the vinyl.

== Reception ==
Professional ratings
Aggregate scores
Source	Rating
Metacritic	88/100
Review scores
Source	Rating
AllMusic	4.5/5 stars
The Arts Desk	5/5 stars
DIY	4/5 stars
Drowned in Sound	9/10
God Is in the TV	9/10
The Line of Best Fit	9/10
Loud and Quiet	7/10
Mojo	4/5 stars
PopMatters	8/10
Uncut	8/10

AllMusic's Liam Martin awarded it four and a half stars out of five, describing it as "the sound of an angry band reacting to an increasingly tense and imbalanced world...they deftly walk the tightrope between tragedy and comedy", calling it "a necessary and thrilling listen from start to finish". Jessica Goodman, reviewing it for DIY magazine, gave it four stars, calling it "as dirty as it is messy. An exhilarating escape along frenzied rhythms and powerhouse rhythms with a ferocious commentary for guidance...as vital as it is volatile." Loud and Quiet's Alex Wisgard rated it 7/10, commenting on Talbot's "absurdist humour" and calling the band "impossibly tight". The NME called it an "expletive-laden, punk triumph that tackles the current Tory rule, toxic masculinity and mental health. Utterly vital." PopMatters reviewer Ian King gave it 8 out of 10, describing it as "one of the more clever and articulate rock records you will hear this year". Uncut described it as "a rare rock record with the rage, urgency, wit and shattering of complacency usually found in grime."

In an interview for Quietus, writer Eoin Murray described Talbot's lyrics on the album as "stark, unabashedly angry and refreshingly unadorned amid the grating instrumentation".

Brutalism was selected at number 5 in BBC 6 Music's list '6 Music Recommends Albums Of The Year 2017', where it was described as "Caustic, volatile, take-no-prisoners indie [that delivers] a truly vital, adrenalin shot to the heart and mind." It was described by Michael Hann in The Guardian as "the most honest album of 2017".

== Track listing ==
Brutalism track listing
No.	Title	Length
1.	"Heel / Heal"	3:28
2.	"Well Done"	2:58
3.	"Mother"	3:26
4.	"Date Night"	3:06
5.	"Faith in the City"	2:36
6.	"1049 Gotho"	3:46
7.	"Divide & Conquer"	3:24
8.	"Rachel Khoo"	3:26
9.	"Stendhal Syndrome"	2:24
10.	"Exeter"	4:00
11.	"Benzocaine"	2:40
12.	"White Privilege"	3:02
13.	"Slow Savage"	3:40
Total length:		41:56

== Personnel ==
Idles

- Joe Talbot – lead vocals
- Mark Bowen – lead guitar
- Lee Kiernan – rhythm guitar
- Adam Devonshire – bass
- Jon Beavis – drums

Production

- Space – producer

== Charts ==
2022 chart performance for Brutalism
Chart (2022)	Peak position
Scottish Albums (Official Charts)	26
UK Albums (Official Charts)	65
UK Independent Albums (Official Charts)	7
UK Rock & Metal Albums (Official Charts)	1

== Certifications ==
Certifications and sales for Brutalism
Region	Certification	Certified units/sales
United Kingdom (BPI)	Silver	60,000^{‡}
^{‡} Sales+streaming figures based on certification alone.
