= Crawler (album) =

Studio album by Idles
- Released: 12 November 2021
- Genres: Hardcore punk; noise rock; post-punk
- Length: 46:27
- Label: Partisan
- Producers: Kenny Beats; Mark Bowen

Idles chronology
Ultra Mono (2020)	Crawler (2021)	Tangk (2024)

Singles from Crawler
- 1. "The Beachland Ballroom" Released: 28 September 2021; 2. "Car Crash" Released: 3 November 2021; 3. "When the Lights Come On" Released: 13 December 2021; 4. "Crawl!" Released: 8 February 2022

Crawler is the fourth studio album by British rock band Idles, released on 12 November 2021.

Crawler received favourable reviews and was nominated for Best Rock Album at the 65th Annual Grammy Awards.

== Promotion ==
=== Singles ===
The first single, "The Beachland Ballroom", was released on 28 September 2021 along with the announcement of the album. Prior to the album's release, the second single, for "Car Crash" was released. The song was about Talbot's terrifying car accident in the past.

=== Music videos ===
After the release of the album, Idles released two music videos from Crawler. The first, "When the Lights Come On" premiered on 13 December 2021 with direction from the company, Holding Hands with Horses. On 8 February 2022, the music video for "Crawl!" was released. The video was a claymation video directed by LOOSE and Edie Lawrence.

== Artwork and title ==
The album cover features a contemporary home, with a man in a helmet and protective pads levitating in front of the home. The artwork for the album was a collaborative effort between lead vocalist Joe Talbot and photographer Tom Ham.

== Music and composition ==
Crawler has been described by critics as primarily a hardcore punk, noise rock, and post-punk record.

== Critical reception ==
Professional ratings
Aggregate scores
Source	Rating
AnyDecentMusic?	7.7/10
Metacritic	82/100
Review scores
Source	Rating
AllMusic	4/5 stars
Clash	8/10
DIY	4/5 stars
The Guardian	5/5 stars
Kerrang!	4/5
The Line of Best Fit	8/10
MusicOMH	4.5/5 stars
The Observer	5/5 stars
Paste	8.8/10
Pitchfork	7.0/10

Crawler was met with "universal acclaim" reviews from critics. At Metacritic, which assigns a weighted average rating out of 100 to reviews from mainstream publications, this release received an average score of 82 based on 18 reviews. Aggregator AnyDecentMusic? gave the release a 7.7 out of 10 based on a critical consensus of 18 reviews.

== Track listing ==
All tracks are written by Joe Talbot, Adam Devonshire, Jonathan Beavis, Lee Kiernan, and Mark Bowen.

Crawler track listing
No.	Title	Length
1.	"MTT 420 RR"	5:30
2.	"The Wheel"	3:25
3.	"When the Lights Come On"	3:10
4.	"Car Crash"	3:53
5.	"The New Sensation"	4:13
6.	"Stockholm Syndrome"	3:02
7.	"The Beachland Ballroom"	4:00
8.	"Crawl!"	4:20
9.	"Meds"	3:56
10.	"Kelechi"	0:30
11.	"Progress"	3:46
12.	"Wizz"	0:30
13.	"King Snake"	2:54
14.	"The End"	3:18
Total length:		46:27

== Personnel ==
Idles

- Jon Beavis – drums
- Mark Bowen – guitar, keyboards, production, engineering
- Adam Devonshire – bass guitar
- Lee Kiernan – guitar
- Joe Talbot – lead vocals, design

Additional personnel

- Kenny Beats – production, engineering
- Joe LaPorta – mastering
- Craig Silvey – mixing
- Chris Fullard – engineering
- Charlotte Nicholls – cello
- Colin Webster – saxophone
- Dane Cross – additional vocals
- Dani Bennett-Spragg – mixing assistance
- Oli Middleton – engineering assistance
- Stan Gravett – engineering assistance
- Tom Ham – photography
- Mishi May – costume design

== Charts ==
Chart performance for Crawler
Chart (2021)	Peak position
Australian Albums (ARIA)	26
Austrian Albums (Ö3 Austria)	32
Belgian Albums (Ultratop Flanders)	15
Belgian Albums (Ultratop Wallonia)	29
Dutch Albums (Album Top 100)	43
German Albums (Offizielle Top 100)	15
Irish Albums (Official Charts)	29
Italian Albums (FIMI)	52
Lithuanian Albums (AGATA)	79
New Zealand Albums (RMNZ)	40
Scottish Albums (Official Charts)	8
Spanish Albums (Promusicae)	64
Swiss Albums (Schweizer Hitparade)	65
UK Albums (Official Charts)	6
UK Independent Albums (Official Charts)	2
US Top Album Sales (Billboard)	30
US Top Alternative Albums (Billboard)	22
US Top Rock Albums (Billboard)	36
US Indie Store Album Sales (Billboard)	10
US Vinyl Albums (Billboard)	15
