= Joe Talbot (singer) =

British singer (born 1984)

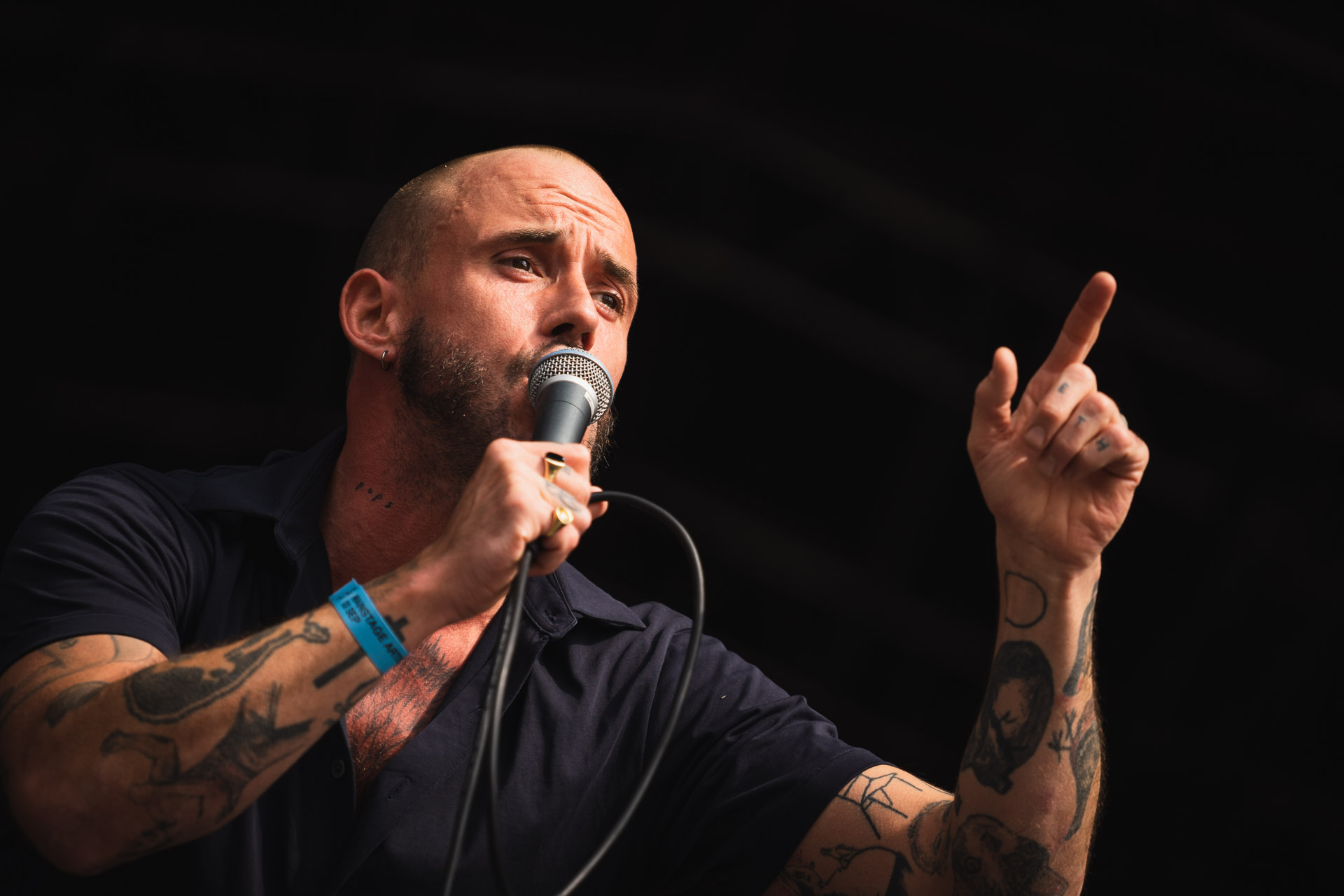
- Talbot performing in September 2021

Background information
- Born: Joseph Talbot; 23 August 1984 (age 41); Newport, Wales
- Origin: Exeter, England
- Genres: Punk rock; post-punk; hardcore punk; indie rock; post-hardcore
- Occupations: Singer; songwriter
- Instrument: Vocals
- Years active: 2009–present
- Labels: Fear of Fiction; Balley Records; Partisan
- Member of: Idles

Joseph Talbot (born 23 August 1984) is a Welsh singer. He has been the vocalist for British rock band Idles since their inception in 2009. In 2025, Talbot began hosting Oh Gatekeeper with Joe Talbot, a one-to-one interview-based podcast.

== Early life ==
Talbot was born in Newport on 23 August 1984. He moved to England as a child, where he grew up in Exeter. He met Idles bassist Adam Devonshire at sixth form college in Exeter before the two moved to Bristol, where they studied at the St Matthias Campus of the University of the West of England and decided to start a band. Following university, they went on to start the now-defunct Bat-Cave night at their local pub in Bristol.

== Music career ==
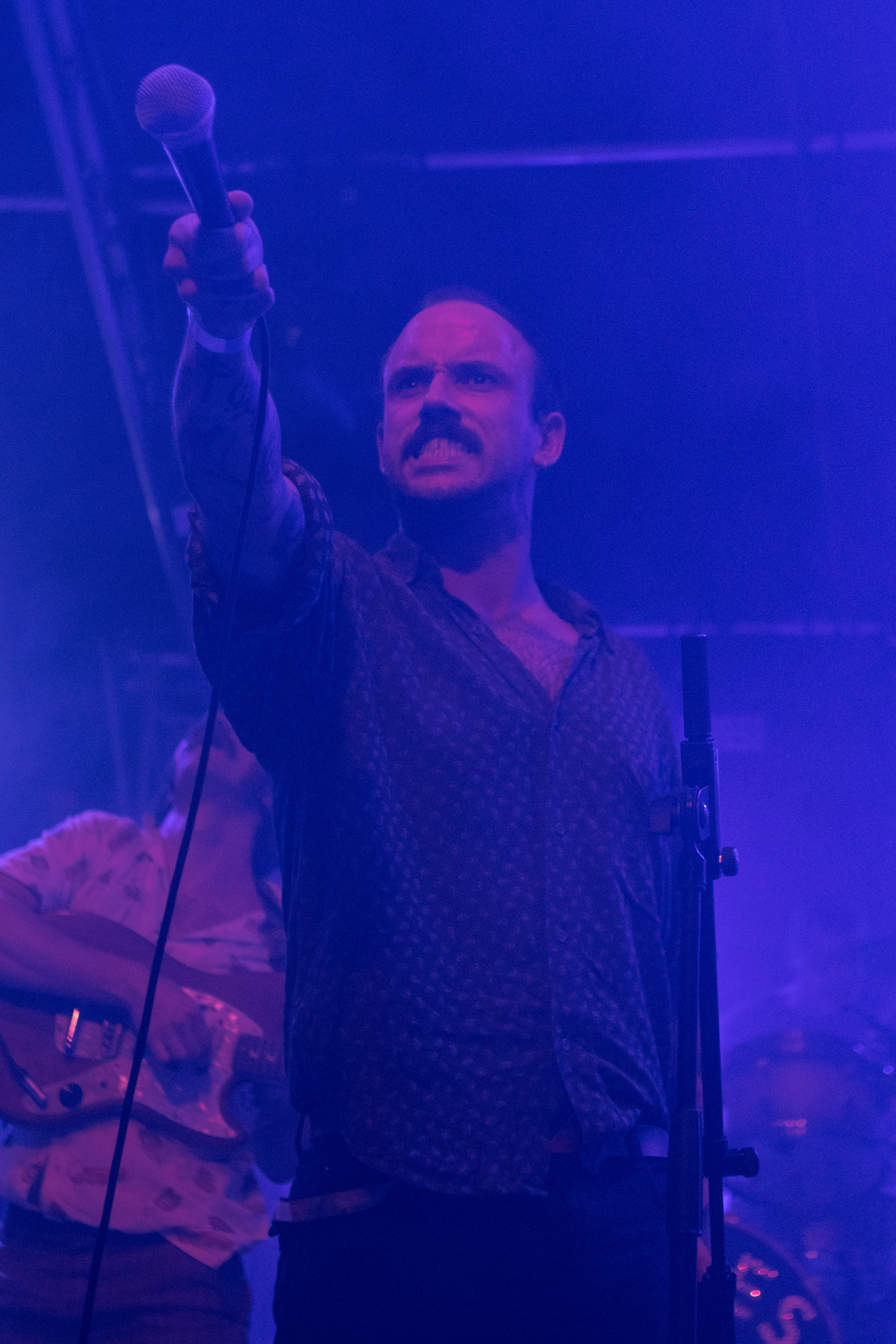
Talbot at Haldern Pop Festival 2017

Talbot has released five studio albums and many EPs and singles with Idles. His music has been described as punk rock, and post-punk, especially due to its passionate nature and political lyrics, which have criticized right-wing news networks such as Fox News and The Sun, (during the Joy tour, Talbot shouted "Don't read The Sun, it'll give you cancer" at shows before the closing song, "Rottweiler") and outlined social issues such as depression, white privilege, and toxic masculinity. However, Talbot has rejected all of these genre labels. In 2017, he was quoted saying: "We're not a post-punk band. I guess we have that motorik, engine-like drive in the rhythm section that some post-punk bands have but we have plenty of songs that aren't like that at all." At a 2018 concert in Manchester, he said: "for the last time, we're not a fucking punk band".

=== Controversies ===
On 28 June 2024, while performing a set at Glastonbury Festival, Talbot encouraged the crowd to chant "Fuck the King", which he called "the new British national anthem", leading to viewers calling for a lifetime ban for his band. He also described Nigel Farage as a "fascist".

== Collaborations ==
Talbot appears on the track Wish on Anna Calvi's fourth full-length album Hunted. In 2020, he collaborated with Jehnny Beth for her debut solo album, To Love Is to Live, co-writing and recording vocals on the track "How Could You". Talbot also sang guest vocals for fellow Bristolians Turbowolf on the track Capital X from their 2018 album The Free Life. Talbot also appears on the Frank Carter and the Rattlesnakes single "My Town" that was released 27 April 2021.

Talbot is the subject of the song "Blood Brother", by Bristol-based band Heavy Lungs, whose vocalist Danny Nedelko is the namesake and subject of the fourth track on Idles' second record Joy as an Act of Resistance.

== Influences ==
He cites LCD Soundsystem, The Strokes, The Streets, Thom Yorke, Battles, The Walkmen, Joy Division, The Horrors, and The Fall as influences.

== Personal life ==
When Talbot was 16, his mother had a stroke and was paralysed; after the death of his step-father, he became his mother's primary caretaker until her death in 2015. She became the primary subject of the Idles album Brutalism.

Talbot and his ex-wife have had two daughters; their first daughter, Agatha, was stillborn in 2017.

Talbot is bisexual.

Talbot has stated he is not religious but "I appreciate faith, I've got a lot of time for it."

During an interview with Apple Music regarding the band's 2020 album Ultra Mono, Talbot stated "I believe in socialism. Go fuck yourselves. I want to sleep at night knowing that my platform is the voice of reason and an egalitarian want for something beautiful – not the murder of Black people, homophobia at the workplace, racist front lines."

== Discography ==
- Brutalism (2017)
- Joy as an Act of Resistance (2018)
- Ultra Mono (2020)
- Crawler (2021)
- Tangk (2024)

=== As a guest singer ===
- Jehnny Beth - "How Could You" (2020)
- Anna Calvi - "Wish" (2020)
- Frank Carter & The Rattlesnakes - "My Town" (2021)
- Lonely Guest - "Pre-War Tension) (2021)
- Metz - "Come on Down) (2022)
- Gorillaz - "The God of Lying" (2025)
