= Angeac-Champagne =

- Commune
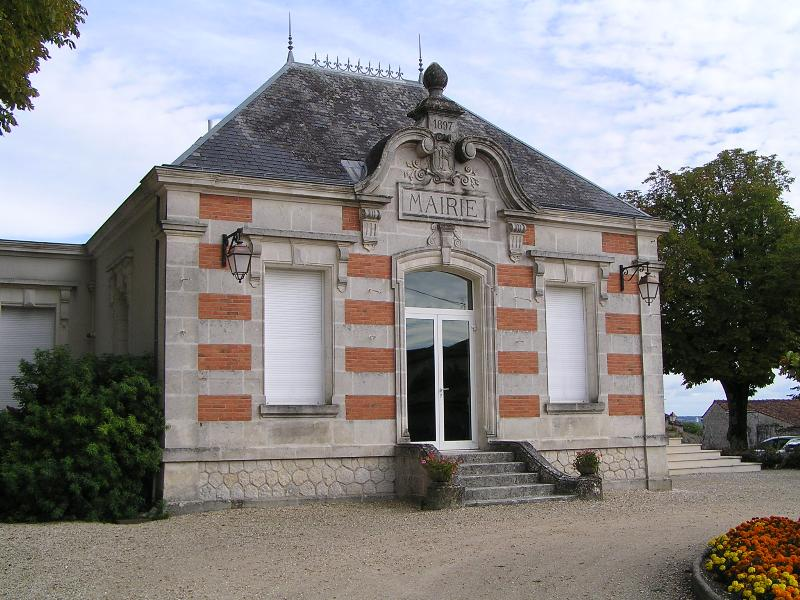
- Town hall

- Coat of arms
- Location of Angeac-Champagne
- Location within France Location within Nouvelle-Aquitaine
- Coordinates: 45°36′30″N 0°17′47″W
- Country: France
- Region: Nouvelle-Aquitaine
- Department: Charente
- Arrondissement: Cognac
- Canton: Charente-Champagne
- Intercommunality: CA Grand Cognac

Government
  - Mayor (2020–2026): Lydie Blanc
- Area^{1}: 14.27 km^{2} (5.51 sq mi)
- Elevation: 71 m (233 ft)
- Highest elevation: 83 m (272 ft)
- Lowest elevation: 17 m (56 ft)
- Population (2023): 495
  - Density: 34.7/km^{2} (89.8/sq mi)
- Time zone: UTC+01:00 (CET)
  - Summer (DST): UTC+02:00 (CEST)
- INSEE/Postal code: 16012 /16130
- ^{1} French Land Register data, which excludes lakes, ponds, glaciers > 1 km^{2} (0.386 sq mi or 247 acres) and river estuaries.

Angeac-Champagne (French pronunciation: [ɑ̃ʒak ʃɑ̃paɲ]) is a commune in the Charente department in the Nouvelle-Aquitaine region of southwestern France.

== Geography ==
=== Location and access ===
Angeac-Champagne is a commune located in the west of the department of Charente, near Charente-Maritime, in Grande Champagne, the premier cru of cognac.

The commune is located 10 km south of Cognac, 6 km west of Segonzac, and 3 km east of Salles-d'Angles. Angoulême, the prefecture of Charente, is 35 km to the east. Angeac is also 9 km north of Archiac, 12 km south-west of Jarnac, and 19 km north-west of Saint-Hilaire.

The commune does not lie on any main roads. The D731 road from Barbezieux to Cognac via Archiac, passes through the west of the commune. The village is served by the D150 from Germignac in the south-east and passes through the village before continuing north-east to join the D44 from Juillac-le-Coq to Roissac towards Cognac and Gensac-la-Pallue. A country road leads to the village of Salles-d'Angles and another to Genté in the north-west.

The nearest train station is at Cognac which is served by the TER between Angoulême, Saintes, and Royan.

=== Hamlets and localities ===
There are many hamlets dotting the commune. In particular Roissac, located northeast of Angeac village, was an ancient parish, and the village is as important as Angeac.

The small village of Le Bois d'Angeac together with a small forest is located 1 km north-west of the village.

Apart from a few small patches of forest the commune is entirely farmland.

=== Geology and relief ===
As with the whole left bank of the Charente between Angoulême and Cognac, this area is limestone dating from the Cretaceous period with Cuestas.

The commune is part of the Campanian (Late Cretaceous) chalky limestone area which occupies a large part of South Charente. There is also some Santonian rock on a small part of the northern border at Longées.

The Campanian cuesta passes through the commune. This escarpment starts in the west at Salles-d'Angles, passes the foot of the town of Genté, then runs through the whole department going east towards Bouteville, Jurignac, and Plassac-Rouffiac. In the commune the escarpment passes through the east as an inlier northeast of Roissac. It separates the north of the plain of Châteaubernard from Champagne to the south.

The highest point in the commune is at an altitude of 84 m located north-west of Roissac. Another high point of 83 m faces it to the east (topped by an IGN Survey marker). The lowest point is 17 m located in Pas de la Tombe on the south-west edge of the commune near Salles d'Angles. The commune mostly varies in height between 40 and 70 m above sea level.

=== Hydrography ===
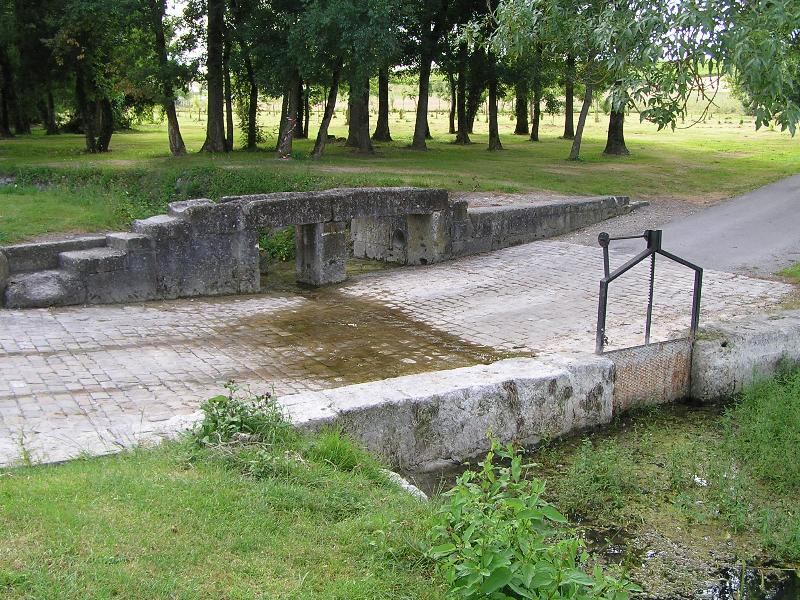
The ford at the Spring of the Three Stones

The Ruisseau de la Motte, a small tributary of the river Né and thus a sub-tributary of the Charente, forms the commune boundary to the south. No other rivers pass through the commune but there are many pools in a valley west of the village and towards Roissac and some springs including the Three Stones east of Bois d'Angeac.

=== Climate ===
The climate is oceanic Aquitaine.

== Toponymy ==
The word Angeac is derived from the Latin Andiacum or villa Andii meaning that the village was built around the property of a rich Gallo-Roman named Andius. The term Champagne was added to the name of the town in 1801 to distinguish it from its namesake Angeac-Charente. In Saintonge the term Champagne refers to a fertile plain of limestone. It is derived from the Latin campus meaning "field" or "plain".

The word Roissac is derived from the Latin Riatacum or villa Riatii meaning that the village was built around the property of a rich Gallo-Roman named Riatus.

== History ==
Proto-historic circular Ditches exist in the areas of Penchant de Lorimont and Houme, with square and circular ones at a place called Les Chirons. Roman villas are said to be at Puits d'Angeac at Chabanne and there are some medieval remains at Branges.

The remains of a Gallo-Roman villa possibly dating to the first half of the 9th century were found in 1904. It was a residence of Louis the Pious. These remains have disappeared.

Angeac was first a dependency of the Templars then passed to the Marquisate of Archiac then often changed hands. In 1239 Roissac passed to the House of Angoulême then at Barbezieux. By marriage Roissac became allied with Salles-d'Angles and Genté. The rights to the marshes resulted in brawls and lawsuits with the Lordship of Gademoulin.

The commune of Angeac was created in 1793 when it belonged to the Canton of Salles in district of Cognac and the Charente department. In 1801, it took the name of Champagne and was attached to the Canton de Segonzac.

The Roissac railway station was served from 1910 to 1939 by the Chemins de fer économiques des Charentes (Cheap Trains of Charente) with a metre gauge line from Cognac to Barbezieux with 3 return trips a day at a speed of 20 km/h. This line also served stations at Cognac, Genté, Segonzac, Juillac-le-Coq, Saint-Fort-sur-le-Né, Archiac, and Barbezieux.

=== Heraldry ===
Arms of Angeac-Champagne	Blazon: Azure, an escutcheon of Or.

== Administration ==
List of Successive Mayors

From	To	Name	Party	Position
2001	2008	Bernadette Jullien		
2008	2020	Gérard Faurie	ind.	Lawyer
2020	2026	Lydie Blanc		

== Population ==
The inhabitants of the commune are known as Angeacais or Angeacaises in French.

Historical population
Year	Pop.	±% p.a.
1968	489	—
1975	470	−0.56%
1982	439	−0.97%
1990	473	+0.94%
1999	479	+0.14%
2007	499	+0.51%
2012	502	+0.12%
2017	509	+0.28%
2023	495	−0.46%
Source: INSEE

== Education ==
The school is an educational inter-communal grouping between Angeac-Champagne and Salles-d'Angles. Angeac-Champagne has a kindergarten and Salles-d'Angles an elementary school.

== Culture and heritage ==
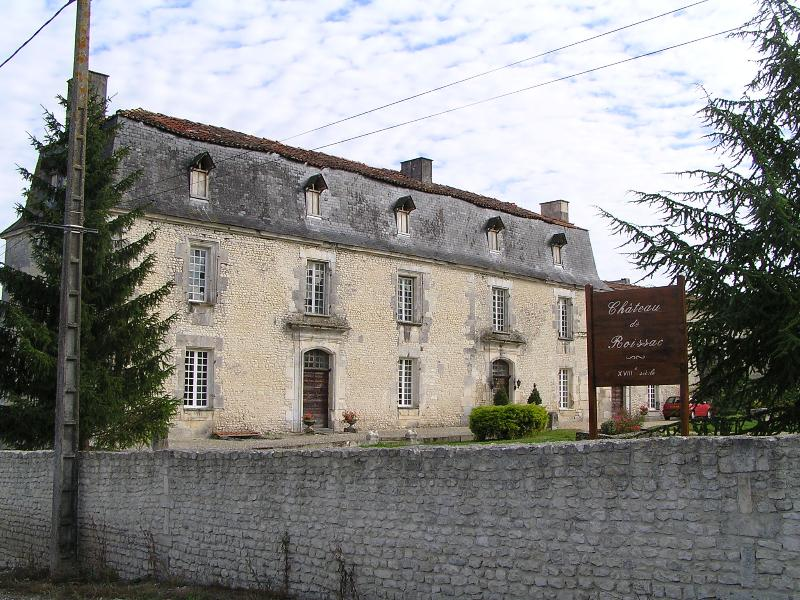
The Chateau de Roissac

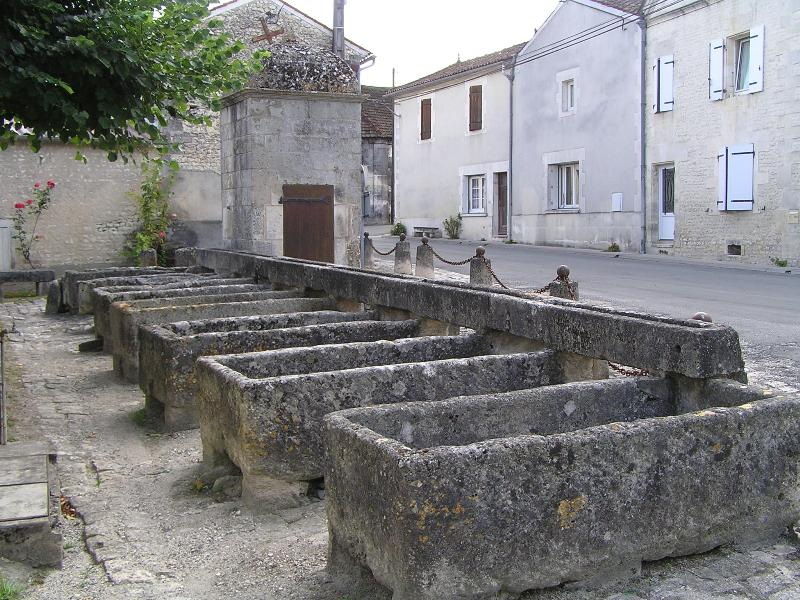
François I Spring at Roissac

The commune contains a very large number of buildings and structures that are registered as historical monuments. Some of the more interesting sites are described below.

=== Civil heritage ===
- The Chateau de Roissac (18th century). The Chateau bears the date 1830 but it was a chateau built in the Middle Ages for the La Rochefoucauld family at the site of a Gallo-Roman villa. The present chateau was built for the Beauchamp family around 1770 and the date 1830 with the initials I.P. corresponds to the remains of the outbuildings. There are decorations and, especially in the living room, wood paneling adorned with paintings of birds, flowers, fruit, landscapes, a scene with a sower, Moses and the Tablets of the Law.
- The Duran S.A. Distillery (1968)
- The Fountain, Lavoir (Public Laundry), and drinking trough at Roissac. They are linked to François I who would have visited the Chateau de Roissac for hunting.
- The Girls' School at Roissac.
- A Watermill at La Motte (in ruins) joined to that of Saint-Fort-sur-le-Né.
- A Windmill at La Millière (19th century)
- A Manor at Lorimont (1831). According to Martin Civat it already existed in the 16th century and was rebuilt in the 19th century. It bears the inscription "FAIT EN 1831 CHAILLOU PAUL" (Made in 1831 Chaillou Paul).
- An Underground refuge (Antiquity). A staircase to the refuge has been identified but its location remains unknown.
- An Ancient Villa of Louis the Pious (Antiquity).

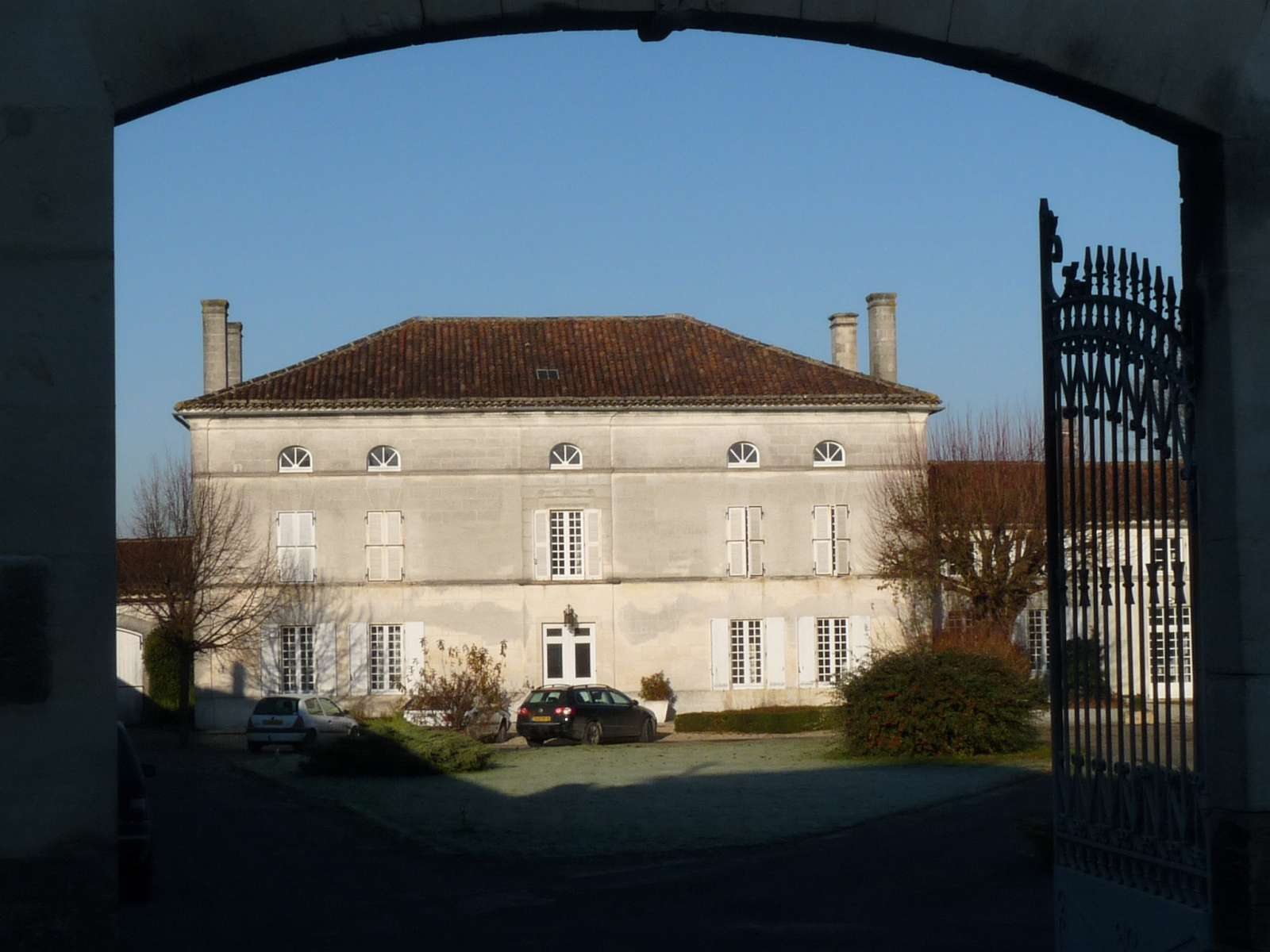
The Logis d'Angeac

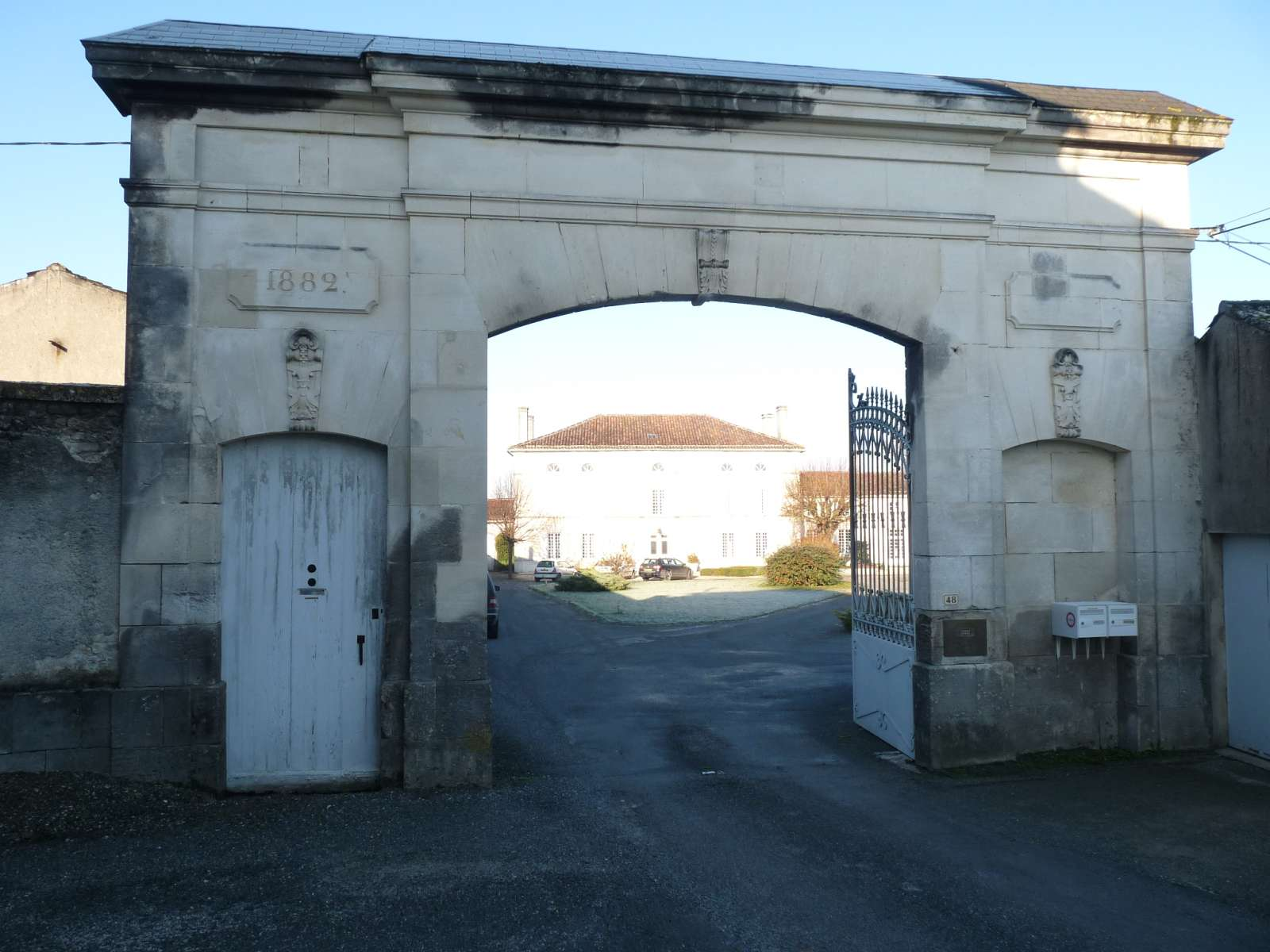
The entrance to the Logis d'Angeac

- The Logis d'Angeac Manor (1733). This is a manor that dates in part to the 16th century. When René de la Tour bought it in 1657 the house was to the north. The outbuildings are dated 1733. Another house was built to the west and rebuilt in the 19th century with outbuildings to the south. The entrance gate bears the date 1882.

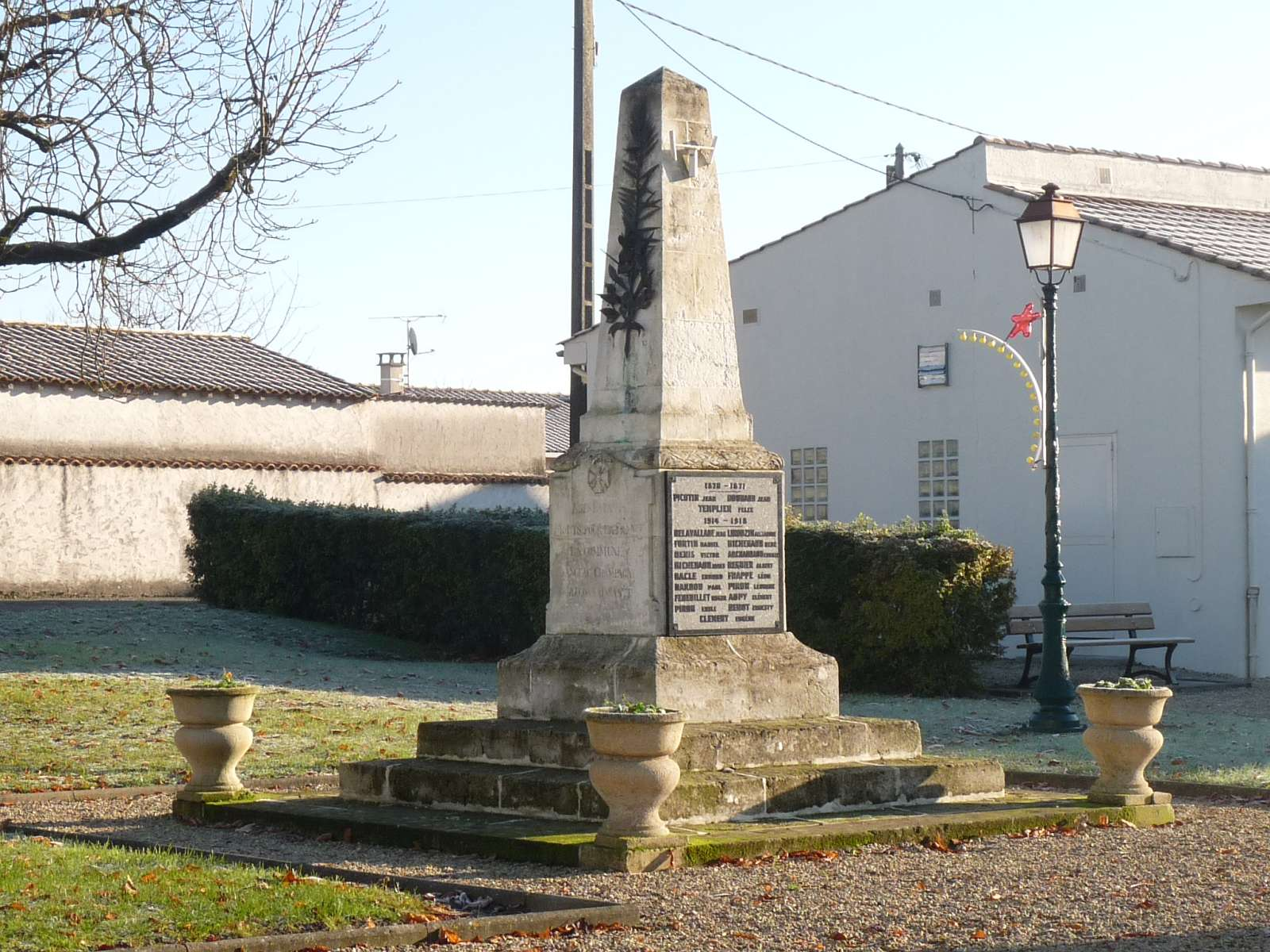
The War Memorial

- The War Memorial (1920).
- The Town Hall (1897). The town hall was built in 1897 and 1898 by Locussol, an entrepreneur from Cognac, from the plans of the architect Lucien Roy also from Cognac.
- Farmhouses (15th - 20th century).

=== Religious heritage ===
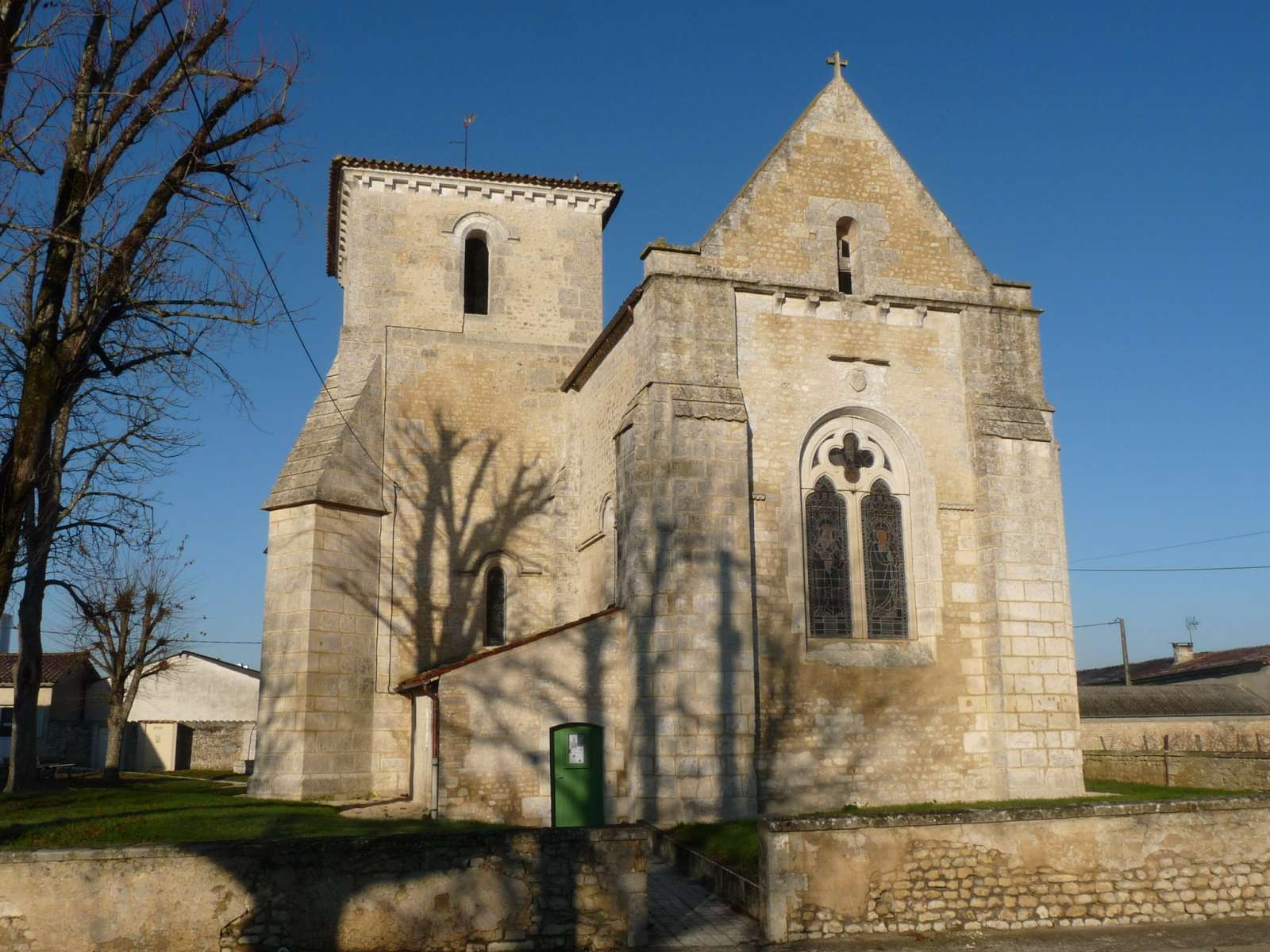
The Church of Saint-Vivien

- A Cemetery Cross (19th century)
- The Pinard Family Funeral Chapel (19th century)
- The Renaud Family Funeral Chapel (19th century)
- The Frapin Gimbelot Prioulat Family Funeral Chapel (19th century)
- The Cemetery (19th century)
- The Parish Church of Saint-Vivien (11th century) The church was built in the 11th century and partly rebuilt in 1534 then repaired at the expense of the priest, Jean Marcus, in 1748 then restored again in 1864. Finally it was vaulted in 1875. It is elongated like a ship and covered by a ribbed vault. The Church contains many items that are registered as historical objects:
  - The Furniture in the Church
  - A Bronze Bell (1783)
  - 2 Vases (19th century)
  - 2 Monstrances (19th century)
  - A Paten (19th century)
  - A Chalice (1884)
  - A Stoup (1874)
  - A Baptismal font (19th century)
  - A Pulpit (1879)
  - A Secondary Altar and Tabernacle (19th century)
  - The main Altar and Tabernacle (1897)
  - A Stained glass window (19th century)
  - A Stained glass window of Saint Theresa of Lisieux (1947)
  - A Stained glass window of Saint Francis of Sales (19th century)
  - A Stained glass window of Saint Joseph, Virgin, and child (19th century)
  - 2 Stained glass windows (19th century)
  - 2 Stained glass windows of Saints Peter and Paul (19th century)
  - 3 Stained glass figures (19th century)

== See also ==
- Communes of the Charente department
