= You Heartbreaker, You =

Studio album by Jehnny Beth
- Released: 29 August 2025
- Studio: 20L07 (France)
- Genres: Dance-punk; art pop; industrial
- Length: 27:31
- Label: Fiction
- Producer: Johnny Hostile

Jehnny Beth chronology
To Love Is to Live (2020)	You Heartbreaker, You (2025)

Singles from You Heartbreaker, You
- 1. "Broken Rib" Released: 15 May 2025

You Heartbreaker, You is the second studio album by French post-punk musician Jehnny Beth. It was released on 29 August 2025 via Fiction Records in LP, CD, and digital formats.

== Background ==
The album was preceded by Beth's 2020 solo release, To Love Is to Live, and her 2021 collaborative project, Utopian Ashes, with Primal Scream lead vocalist Bobby Gillespie. It consists of nine songs, ranging between two and three minutes each, with a total runtime of approximately twenty-seven minutes. It incorporates elements of punk, dance, art pop and industrial.

"Broken Rib" was released as the first single of the album on 15 May 2025, with a music video directed by Beth and Johnny Hostile.

== Reception ==
Professional ratings
Review scores
Source	Rating
Clash	7/10
Dork	4/5 stars
Kerrang	4/5
The Line of Best Fit	7/10
Louder	4/5 stars

Paul Brannigan, writing for Louder, assigned the album a rating of four stars and described it as "magnificent, special" and "a wonderfully abrasive, confrontational and cathartic record".

You Heartbreaker, You received a rating of four out of five from Dork, whose reviewer Felicity Newton described it as "uncompromising and allergic to anything resembling warmth" and "a record that feels like it belongs to people who smoke indoors, drink only black coffee and consider eye contact a form of violence." Emma Wilkers of Kerrang! rated the release four out of five, stating that "It's primal in multiple dimensions – confrontational, sexual, alight with a revolutionary spark – all made possible by an approach that feels proudly organic, unvarnished, even."

The album was given a rating of seven by English magazine the Line of Best Fit, which remarked, "Some lyrics dip into abstraction while others cut like shards, but the common thread attempts to be honest," stating it "stylistically cherry picks at genres." Margot MacLeod of Clash referred to the album as a "release to listen to," opining that "Despite the industrial and slick sound, the purity in Beth's voice outshines the sheen that drapes over the album," and rating it seven.

== Track listing ==
All lyrics are written by Jehnny Beth; all music is composed by Johnny Hostile.

No.	Title	Length
1.	"Broken Rib"	3:16
2.	"No Good for People"	2:32
3.	"Obsession"	3:21
4.	"Out of My Reach"	3:31
5.	"I Still Believe"	3:20
6.	"Reality"	2:39
7.	"Stop Me Now"	2:39
8.	"High Resolution Sadness"	2:47
9.	"I See Your Pain"	3:26
Total length:		27:31

== Personnel ==
Credits adapted from the album's liner notes.

- Jehnny Beth – vocals
- Johnny Hostile – recording, production, guitar, drums, bass, synthesizers, cover photo
- Matty Green – mixing
- Andy "Hippy" Baldwin – mastering
- Brian Roettinger – album design
- Nicolas Bernklau – album design
- Alexandra Dezzi – cover graffiti

== Charts ==
Chart performance for You Heartbreaker, You
Chart (2025)	Peak position
French Rock & Metal Albums (SNEP)	38
Scottish Albums (Official Charts)	67
UK Albums Sales (OCC)	21
UK Independent Albums (Official Charts)	9
UK Rock & Metal Albums (Official Charts)	5
