= Armand Berton =

Armand Berton may refer to:

- Armand Berton (painter) (1854–1927), French painter, engraver and illustrator
- Armand Berton (politician) (1859–1916), French politician
