= Niari Valley =

The Niari valley is a fertile region in the Niari Department in the south west of the Republic of the Congo. The soil in the area is good and this state is an important agricultural and industrial region.

== Geography ==
The Mayombé Escarpment in the Republic of the Congo rises to 800 metres (2,600 ft) and runs parallel with the coast. It is a forested area with high rainfall. Inland from this and at a lower elevation is the Niari Valley. It is an area of savannah and woodland and the rainfall here is lower. The valley has most of the country's agribusinesses and the main crops are coffee, cocoa, sugar, maize, tobacco and palm oil. Livestock is also reared in this area. The River Niari is not used for transport because the navigable stretches are separated by frequent rapids, and where it flows through the Mayombé Escarpment there are gorges. Big game such as elephant, leopard and buffalo still roam in this area, especially in the Mount Fouari Reserve.

== History of agriculture ==
The Niari Valley has an area of about 400,000 hectares. Three quarters of this is fertile land with a deep layer of humus. After World War II, the families of a group of people that had been in the French Resistance in Aubeville, France, moved to the valley to set up a communal farming project. At the time some pioneering French farmers were already located in the valley but there were few native inhabitants in the area. The valley had the advantage of having the only railway line in the country running through it. The new settlers were granted a concession of 5,500 hectares but encountered difficulties in their early years, including plant pests and diseases, droughts and occasionally hailstorms. They did small-scale crop raising, poultry rearing and livestock husbandry, and tried out new crops such as rice, groundnuts and tobacco.

Not long afterwards, research stations were set up by the French state which planted oil-palm plantations, built mills to extract the oil, mechanized the production of peanuts, experimented with growing Urena lobata, planted sugarcane and built a sugar refinery, mechanized rice production, and grew citrus, bananas and pineapples. Other enterprises included prospecting for minerals, a tree nursery for limba was established and a herd of about 2,000 N'Dama cattle was built up.

In 1970 the agricultural assets and the sugar plantations were nationalised and became a state run organisation, Société Industrielle et Agricole du Niari. By 1978 there had been an 80% decline in sugar production and the company went bankrupt, owing large sums to the treasury. The same year, it was broken into three parts, one being Sucrerie du Congo. By 1988, sugar plantations covered 22,000 hectares, but, after a few good years, the labour force had grown too large and productivity had fallen, so in 1991 the company was privatised once again under the name SARIS-Congo.
