= To Love Is to Live =

Studio album by Jehnny Beth
- Released: 12 June 2020
- Genre: Alternative rock, industrial
- Length: 38:37
- Label: Caroline Records
- Producer: Johnny Hostile; Flood; Atticus Ross; Adam Bartlett

Jehnny Beth chronology
| To Love Is to Live (2020) | You Heartbreaker, You (2025) |

Singles from To Love Is to Live
- 1. "I'm the Man" Released: 3 December 2019; 2. "Flower" Released: 12 February 2020; 3. "Heroine" Released: 15 May 2020; 4. "We Will Sin Together" Released: 12 June 2020

To Love Is to Live is the debut studio album by Jehnny Beth, some of the songs in which were co-produced with Flood. It was released in June 2020 on Caroline Records. The Guardian described the record as "a restless album that thrives on contrast: from delicate piano ballads to thrashing metal". The album was released to critical acclaim.

Beth presented it as a collaborative album rather than a solo album, saying it was also a personal record. The record features several collaborations. Atticus Ross co-wrote and co-produced the opening track "I Am". Romy Madley Croft of the xx recorded backing vocals on "We Will Sin Together" and co-composed the tracks "Heroine" and "French Countryside". Joe Talbot of Idles co-wrote and sings with Beth the lyrics of "How Could You", while actor Cillian Murphy recites poetry on "A Place Above".

== Background, writing and music ==
Beth had previously recorded two albums with John & Jehn, and two albums with the band Savages. To Love Is to Live is her fifth studio album with long time partner, collaborator, and producer Johnny Hostile. She hadn't planned to work on a solo album until January 2016, when she woke up in the middle of the night and learned that David Bowie had died. She then listened to Blackstar and the idea to release an album on her own became a necessity. It reminded her that albums outlived artists, so she worked on her new record “as if I was going to die.” To Love Is to Live was composed over a period of several years. She wrote the lyrics first in 2016 and each song was orchestrated many times differently. She selected certain emotions of each version.

Q notes that the album includes both "haunting" ballads such as the piano led "French Countryside" and industrial beats like on the "fierce" single "I'm the Man". The Guardian wrote that "there’s the glitchy fury" of "How Could You". The Independent described "Flower" as a whispered single and "Innocence” as a number with half-spoken vocals and industrial noise. Reviewer Elisa Bray noted that "The Rooms” is "one of the most tender tracks on the album" with "sparse piano, cello, muffled vocal samples and saxophone", with a soft and melancholic voice.

== Artwork ==
The sleeve was a collaboration of several months with Tom Hingston (who had previously conceived the artworks of Massive Attack's Mezzanine and Nick Cave's Push the Sky Away). Beth had mentioned to him that she had started doing boxing workouts and that she was fascinated by some photographs of bodybuilders. She worked with a choreographer during a one-day photo session and they then picked the pose that was the most representative of her on stage.

== Release ==
The album was released on 12 June 2020. It was issued on several formats: CD, black vinyl, red vinyl (limited edition for North America), and white vinyl (limited edition for the UK and Europe).

== Critical reception ==
Professional ratings
Aggregate scores
| Source | Rating |
|---|---|
| Metacritic | 81/100 |
Review scores
| Source | Rating |
| AllMusic | 4/5 stars |
| Clash | 9/10 |
| Exclaim! | 7/10 |
| The Guardian | 4/5 stars |
| The Independent | 4/5 stars |
| NME | 4/5 stars |
| Pitchfork | 7.7/10 |
| PopMatters | 9/10 |
| Q | 4/5 stars |
| Rolling Stone | 4/5 stars |

To Love Is to Live was met with "generally favorable" reviews from critics. At Metacritic, which assigns a weighted average rating out of 100 to reviews from mainstream publications, this release received an average score of 81, based on 20 reviews.

In a review rated 9 out of 10, Pop Matters hailed the album saying, "To Love Is to Live is an emotional essay in which Jehnny Beth has created one of the most compelling and sincere albums of the year so far". NME lauded it writing, Beth's solo debut "pulses with power and sensitivity", including tracks such as "Flower" described as "a trip-hop ode to a dancer" and "We’ll Sin Together" arranged with "delicate synths". AllMusic hailed "the complexity within Beth's songwriting" and "the sheer intensity" of the songs, including "the inclusion of a piano ballad as heartfelt and classically beautiful". Reviewer Heather Phares concluded: "[it] is an unabashedly, thrillingly wild ride, and as Beth throws everything she has at her audience, she fully reveals the multitudes she contains". The Independent praised the record for, "taking you on a journey which reveals new landmarks and perspectives each time you listen, To Love is to Live is a compelling and real cinematic picture of the emotions that life throws at us. It’s a journey you will want to relive". Q rated it 4 out of 5 stars and presented it as a "majestic solo outing", noting that the album was eclectic, including dreamy ballads and "fist-clenched chorusing". Reviever Niall Doherty qualified it as a "masterful record".

== Track listing ==
| No. | Title | Music | Producer(s) | Length |
|---|---|---|---|---|
| 1. | "I Am" | Atticus Ross; Johnny Hostile; Jehnny Beth | Atticus Ross; Johnny Hostile | 3:42 |
| 2. | "Innocence" | J. Hostile; J. Beth | Adam Bartlett; Flood; J. Hostile | 3:22 |
| 3. | "Flower" | J. Hostile; J. Beth; Tristane Mesquita | A. Bartlett; Flood; J. Hostile | 3:20 |
| 4. | "We Will Sin Together" | J. Hostile; J. Beth | J. Hostile | 3:00 |
| 5. | "A Place Above" (featuring Cillian Murphy) | J. Hostile; J. Beth | J. Hostile | 1:13 |
| 6. | "I'm the Man" | A. Ross; J. Hostile; J. Beth | | 2:39 |
| 7. | "The Rooms" | J. Beth | A. Bartlett; Flood; J. Hostile | 4:19 |
| 8. | "Heroine" | J. Hostile; J. Beth; Romy Madley Croft | A. Bartlett; Flood; J. Hostile; Anders Trentemøller | 4:02 |
| 9. | "How Could You?" | J. Hostile; J. Beth; Joe Talbot | A. Bartlett; J. Hostile | 3:00 |
| 10. | "French Countryside" | J. Hostile; J. Beth; R. Croft | A. Bartlett; Flood; J. Hostile | 3:58 |
| 11. | "Human" | A. Ross; J. Hostile; J. Beth | A. Ross; J. Hostile | 6:02 |
| Total length: | | | | 38:37 |

== Charts ==
Chart performance for To Love Is to Live
| Chart | Peak position |
|---|---|
| Belgian Albums (Ultratop Wallonia) | 136 |
| Scottish Albums (OCC) | 28 |
| Swiss Albums (Schweizer Hitparade) | 96 |
| UK Albums (OCC) | 95 |

== Personnel ==
Credits adapted from Tidal.

Musicians

- Jehnny Beth – lead vocals (all tracks), piano (tracks 7, 10)
- Johnny Hostile – acoustic guitar (tracks 3), bass guitar (tracks 1, 2, 3, 4, 8, 9, 10, 11), guitar (tracks 1, 9), piano (tracks 1, 2, 4, 5, 8, 11), backing vocalist (tracks 9, 11)
- Tom Herbet – double bass (track 7)
- Kirk Hellie – guitar (tracks 1, 11)
- Nick Chuba – mandolin (track 1), cello (track 11), keyboard (track 11)
- Wendy Killmann – drums (tracks 2, 3, 8)
- Romy Madley Croft – vocalist (track 4)
- Cillian Murphy – vocalist (track 5)
- Iggor Cavalera – drums (track 7)
- Jorja Chalmers – saxophone (track 7)
- Joe Talbot – vocalist (track 9)

Production

- Atticus Ross – producer (tracks 1, 2, 11)
- Johnny Hostile – producer (tracks 1, 2, 4, 5, 7, 8, 9, 10, 11), programmer (tracks 3, 8)
- Adam Bartlet – producer (tracks 3, 7, 8, 9, 10, programmer (track 8)
- Flood – producer (tracks 2, 7, 8, 10), programmer (track 3)
- Richie Kennedy – programmer (track 3)
- Tom Herbet – mixing assistant (all tracks)
- Mike Bozzi – engineer (all tracks)
- Caesar Edmunds – mixing (all tracks)
- Alan Moulder – mixing (all tracks)
- Oli Kraus – string arrange (tracks 1, 11)
- Shuta Shinoda – engineer (tracks 7, 10)
- Anders Trentemøller – producer (track 8)
