= Adore Life =

Studio album by Savages
- Released: 22 January 2016
- Recorded: April 2015 at RAK Studios in London, United Kingdom
- Genres: Post-punk, noise rock
- Length: 39:25
- Label: Matador
- Producer: Johnny Hostile

Savages chronology
Silence Yourself (2013)	Adore Life (2016)

Adore Life is the second and final studio album by the English post-punk band Savages, released on 22 January 2016. The album was also nominated for the 2016 Mercury Prize, the band's second consecutive nomination after Silence Yourself was nominated for the prize in 2013.

== Music and style ==
Adore Life drew comparison once again to Siouxsie Sioux. Financial Times wrote: "Beth sings with imposing control: even the words she utters with a wild yelp, à la Siouxsie Sioux, seem purposely unleashed". Critic Ludovic Hunter-Tilney described the music as, "Distorted guitars set up flayed layers of sound, backed by sinewy drums and bass".

== Critical reception ==
Professional ratings
Aggregate scores
Source	Rating
AnyDecentMusic?	7.8/10
Metacritic	82/100
Review scores
Source	Rating
AllMusic	4/5 stars
The A.V. Club	C+
Chicago Tribune	3.5/4 stars
Entertainment Weekly	A−
The Guardian	4/5 stars
Mojo	4/5 stars
NME	4/5
Pitchfork	8.0/10
Rolling Stone	3.5/5 stars
Spin	6/10

Adore Life received widespread critical acclaim upon its release. At Metacritic, which assigns a normalised rating out of 100 to reviews from mainstream critics, the album received an average score of 82, based on 33 reviews, indicating "universal acclaim". In a favourable review, Paste said that Adore Life was still inspired by Savages' first influences while adding, it "builds on that sound, and frames it in a contemporary context that is less throwback than thrilling". In a 3.5 out of 5 review, Rolling Stone wrote that "their music is driven by emotions that are almost unprecedented in the [post-punk] genre".

=== Accolades ===
Publication	Accolade	Year	Rank	Ref.
American Songwriter	Top 50 Albums of 2016	2016	34	
Consequence of Sound	Top 50 Albums of 2016	2016	39	
NME	NME's Albums of the Year 2016	2016	46	
Pitchfork	The 20 Best Rock Albums of 2016	2016	—N/a	
Rough Trade	Albums of the Year	2016	38	
The Skinny	Top 50 Albums of 2016	2016	24	

== Track listing ==
All lyrics are written by Jehnny Beth; all music is composed by Ayse Hassan, Fay Milton, Gemma Thompson, and Jehnny Beth.

No.	Title	Length
1.	"The Answer"	3:30
2.	"Evil"	3:36
3.	"Sad Person"	3:48
4.	"Adore"	5:03
5.	"Slowing Down the World"	4:01
6.	"I Need Something New"	4:39
7.	"When In Love"	3:11
8.	"Surrender"	3:24
9.	"T.I.W.Y.G."	3:09
10.	"Mechanics"	5:09
Total length:		39:25

== Personnel ==
Savages

- Jehnny Beth – vocals
- Gemma Thompson – guitar
- Ayse Hassan – bass guitar
- Fay Milton – drums

Technical

- Johnny Hostile – production
- Trentemøller – mixing
- John Davis – mastering
- Richard Woodcraft – engineering

Artwork

- Craig Ward – design, logo

== Chart positions ==
Chart (2016)	Peak position
Austrian Albums (Ö3 Austria)	63
Belgian Albums (Ultratop Flanders)	34
Belgian Albums (Ultratop Wallonia)	51
French Albums (SNEP)	57
German Albums (Offizielle Top 100)	53
Dutch Albums (Album Top 100)	39
New Zealand Albums (RMNZ)	40
Portuguese Albums (AFP)	17
UK Albums Chart	26
US Billboard 200	99
US Alternative Albums (Billboard)	5
US Independent Albums (Billboard)	3
US Top Rock Albums (Billboard)	6
