= Silence Yourself =

Studio album by Savages
- Released: 6 May 2013
- Recorded: December 2012 at Fishfactory in London, United Kingdom
- Genre: Post-punk; alternative rock
- Length: 38:39
- Label: Matador, Pop Noire
- Producer: Johnny Hostile, Rodaidh McDonald

Savages chronology
I Am Here (2012)	Silence Yourself (2013)	Adore Life (2016)

Silence Yourself is the debut studio album by the English post-punk band Savages, released on 6 May 2013 on Matador Records and Pop Noire, a label owned by vocalist Jehnny Beth. It was nominated for the 2013 Mercury Prize.

== Music and style ==
Critics made a parallel with British post-punk of the late 1970s, Magazine and Gang of Four. NME wrote that "French frontwoman Jehnny Beth has moulded herself into the demonic, possessed spawn of Ian Curtis and Siouxsie Sioux". Uncut retrospectively said about the music: "It is a bit Siouxsie, a bit Stranglers, a bit Magazine – and after a decade-odd of bands reviving the sounds and strategies of post-punk".

== Reception and legacy ==
Professional ratings
Aggregate scores
Source	Rating
AnyDecentMusic?	8.0/10
Metacritic	82/100
Review scores
Source	Rating
AllMusic	4/5 stars
The A.V. Club	B
Chicago Tribune	3.5/4 stars
The Daily Telegraph	4/5 stars
The Guardian	4/5 stars
Mojo	4/5 stars
NME	8/10
Pitchfork	8.7/10
Rolling Stone	3.5/5 stars
Spin	8/10

Silence Yourself received widespread critical acclaim upon its release. At Metacritic, which assigns a normalised rating out of 100 to reviews from mainstream critics, the album received an average score of 82, based on 36 reviews, indicating "universal acclaim".

In the United Kingdom, the album reached No. 19 on the charts. In the United States, the album debuted at No. 70 on the Billboard 200, and No. 20 on the Rock Albums chart. The album has sold 43,000 copies in the US as of December 2015.

Retrospectively, Silence has continued to earn critical praise. In 2016, Treble placed it on their list of the 21st century's essential post-punk albums. In 2020, NME included Silence in their list of 15 "wildly influential" records in the post-punk genre. Noting Savages' "much-needed dose of self-mythology" they brought with them, they credited the band with sparking important questions about the perceived "bolshy [and] intimidating" nature of women in punk music.

In 2019, Pitchfork ranked Silence Yourself at number 178 on their list of "The 200 Best Albums of the 2010s"; senior editor Stacey Anderson wrote: "Silence Yourself carries every bit of [Savages' live show] adrenaline; in its coiled, sparking guitars and rabid screams, it warns of the dangers of technology while weaponizing its potential."

=== Accolades ===
Publication	Accolade	Year	Rank	Ref.
The A.V. Club	The 23 Best Albums of 2013	2013	7	
AllMusic	Best of 2013	2013	-	
BBC Music	Albums of the Year 2013	2013	4	
MusicOMH	Top 100 Albums of 2013	2013	8	
NME	50 Best Albums of 2013	2013	5	
Pitchfork	The Top 50 Albums of 2013	2013	9	
The Quietus	Albums of the Year 2013	2013	11	
Time Out	Top 20 Albums of 2013	2013	12	
Village Voice	The 25 Best Albums of 2013	2013	12	

== Track listing ==
All tracks are written by Savages.

No.	Title	Length
1.	"Shut Up"	4:48
2.	"I Am Here"	3:20
3.	"City's Full"	3:27
4.	"Strife"	3:57
5.	"Waiting for a Sign"	5:25
6.	"Dead Nature"	2:06
7.	"She Will"	3:27
8.	"No Face"	3:35
9.	"Hit Me"	1:41
10.	"Husbands"	2:50
11.	"Marshal Dear"	4:03
Total length:		38:39

== Personnel ==
All personnel credits adapted from Silence Yourself's album notes.

Savages

- Jehnny Beth – vocals, piano
- Gemma Thompson – guitar, illustration
- Ayse Hassan – bass
- Fay Milton – drums

Additional musicians

- Duke Garwood – clarinet (11)

Technical personnel

- Johnny Hostile – production, mixing
- Rodaidh McDonald – production, mixing
- Mattia Sartori – assistant engineering
- Mike Marsh – mastering

Design personnel

- Antoine Carlier – design
- Richard Dumas – photography

"Shut Up" samples Joan Blondell's dialogue from the 1977 John Cassavetes film Opening Night.

== Chart positions ==
Chart (2013)	Peak position
Belgian Albums Chart (Flanders)	64
Belgian Albums Chart (Wallonia)	93
Dutch Albums Chart	75
Irish Albums Chart	39
Irish Independent Albums Chart	5
UK Albums Chart	19
UK Independent Albums Chart	5
US Billboard 200	70
US Billboard Alternative Albums	14
US Billboard Independent Albums	13
US Billboard Rock Albums	20
