= Savages (band) =

English rock band

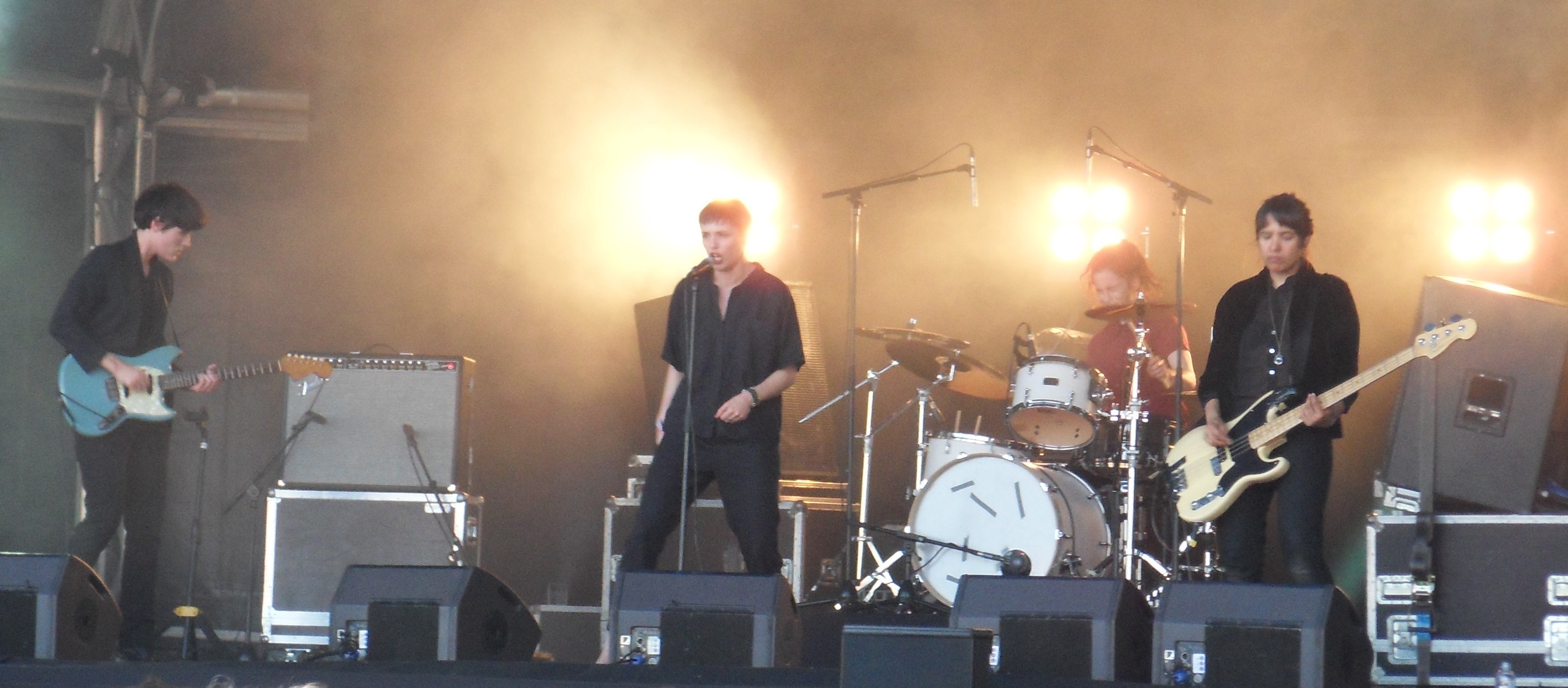
- Savages at Primavera Sound 2013

Background information
- Origin: London, England
- Genres: Post-punk revival; noise rock; alternative rock
- Years active: 2011–2017
- Labels: Pop Noire; Matador
- Spinoffs: John & Jehn; Hindley; Partly Faithful; Kite Base; Otomo X; Bashan; Unmoor Kiva; 1080db; Esya; Tondo; Goddess
- Past members: Jehnny Beth; Gemma Thompson; Ayse Hassan; Fay Milton

Savages were an English rock band formed in 2011 in London. The band consisted of Jehnny Beth (vocals), Gemma Thompson (guitars), Ayse Hassan (bass), and Fay Milton (drums). Their debut album, Silence Yourself was released on 6 May 2013 via Matador Records. It reached number 19 in the UK Albums Chart in May 2013, and was critically acclaimed. It peaked at number 5 on the Irish and the UK Independent Albums Chart, and at number 13 on the US Billboard Independent Albums chart. The band's second album Adore Life, was released on 22 January 2016. Both albums were nominated for the Mercury Prize, in 2013 and 2016 respectively.

== History ==
=== Origins ===
Savages were a rock band from London. The band's guitarist Gemma Thompson had come up with the name for the band and had been discussing the idea with singer Jehnny Beth for almost a year prior to the band forming. Thompson says the band's name was derived from books, such as Lord of the Flies, that she read when she was younger. The band was eventually formed in October 2011 and they had their first gig in January 2012, supporting rock band British Sea Power. Their manager was John Best. The Observer has said of Savages: "it's not exactly sexy, it's not funny and they're not going to be rolling around in mud like the Slits. But it's the closest thing to art that "post-punk"... has offered in a while". The New Musical Express (NME) described their performances as "frottage-inducingly intense affairs".

The group's first released tracks, a double A-side in June 2012, were "Flying to Berlin" and "Husbands" on the Pop Noire label. The Guardian wrote: "Husbands makes us dream of what it must have been like to have been around to hear, in real time, the debut releases by Public Image Ltd, Magazine, Siouxsie and the Banshees and Joy Division, to feel, as those incredible records hit the shops, that unearthly power and sense of a transmission from a satellite reality." Similarly, Beat magazine described Beth's performance as "Ian Curtis–esque spasmodic shakes and urgent guttural vocals from the Siouxsie Sioux school of noise." In October, their concert at the CMJ Music Marathon in New York received good reviews. The Chicago Reader noted that their set was "influenced by Siouxsie & the Banshees, but with an anthemic quality that makes me think of PJ Harvey and heavy doses of the rhythmic jaggedness and angularity of British postpunk." The group expressed their liking for these bands, and added: "We listened to a lot of different music [...] Our influences are male and female in equal measure."

On 9 December 2012, the BBC announced that the band had been nominated for the Sound of 2013 poll.

=== Silence Yourself ===
On 6 May 2013, Savages released their first album Silence Yourself on Beth's own label Pop Noire and Matador Records. The band wanted "a live sound and a live feel" on the album so recorded it together live, instead of recording each part separately to bring together in a mix.

In 2013, Savages played on the second day of the Coachella Music and Arts Festival and were well received by reviewers. In 2014, the band, together with the Japanese art-rock four-piece Bo Ningen, performed Words To The Blind, a sonic poem where both bands play simultaneously. On two occasions, the band asked local choreographers in London and New York City to perform a dance piece on a 30-minute version of their track "Dead Nature" in the middle of the crowd. In 2014, in a Pop Matters interview with Guy Mankowski, the band discussed how, at another of their events at the Ministry of Sound, the crowd were placed around the musicians in order to "create total immersion and intimacy".

In July 2015, Savages, A Dead Forest Index, and choreographer/dance artist Fernanda Muñoz-Newsome created two nights of performance as part of Station to Station: A 30-day Happening at the Barbican Centre in London. The performances took place in the Barbican Art Gallery and incorporated music, poetry and dance. The performances were recorded and released on vinyl at Station to Station.

=== Adore Life ===
On 22 January 2016, Savages released their second album, Adore Life via Matador Records. The band then went on a world tour in support of the album, wrapping in July 2017 at Presqu'île de Malsaucy in Belfort, France. In November 2016, the band curated their own program during the tenth Anniversary Edition of Le Guess Who? Festival in Utrecht, The Netherlands. The program included performances by Beak>, Tim Hecker, Jessy Lanza, Bo Ningen and Hannah Peel.

=== Disbandment ===
In July 2017, Savages played their final show at Eurockéennes de Belfort in Belfort, France before quietly disbanding. There was no official statement from Savages about the band's split. In an interview given the year before, however, Beth had revealed that the band had been working continuously between their two latest records, taking only a month-long break beforehand. She noted that following their touring commitments for Adore Life being completed, it would be "a good time for us to break apart and do other projects." In June 2025, Beth revealed during a Q&A session on her Instagram story that "the dynamic inside and outside the band were soooo [sic] difficult", which took a toll of her mental health that time. When asked about the band's possible return, she simply stated: "No. As per my previous answer - it would be like asking a friend to go back to a toxic ex."

In January 2026, to commemorate the 10-year anniversary of Adore Life, the band released two previously-unreleased songs from the original album sessions: a cover of Black Sabbath's "Paranoid", and the original song "Prayer". Following the album's anniversary, it was later confirmed that the band had officially disbanded. In their final interview with Rolling Stone, Thompson stated that Savages "is totally in the past tense". Hassan attributed the dissolution to inevitable creative differences while expressing pride in the band's legacy, noting: "We embraced the impermanence of the situation by giving it all when it mattered... I really am proud that we gave it everything in the moments that we played together."

== Side projects & post-breakup ==
In June 2020, Beth released her first solo album To Love Is to Live. She has also collaborated with other musicians, such as the Strokes' frontman Julian Casablancas; as duet singer for a Sort Sol and Lydia Lunch cover, "Boy/Girl", Trentemøller; as featured artist in the song "Complicated" and as singer-songwriter for the song "River in Me", and Damon Albarn of Gorillaz; as featured artist, in the second single from album Humanz, "We Got the Power" and with IDLES for their song "Ne Touche Pas Moi" on their 2020 album Ultra Mono. In 2017, she revealed a collaboration with Primal Scream front man Bobby Gillespie for her upcoming solo works. The two later made a studio album together, Utopian Ashes, in 2021.

In 2015, Hassan formed an experimental electronic duo, Kite Base, with fellow bassist Kendra Frost. The duo released their debut album, Latent Whispers, in May 2017. Together with Milton, Hassan also formed Otomo X, an experimental collaborative group with London-based DJ and producer Martin Dubka. In 2018, Milton and Hassan formed another duo, 180dB. Their debut single, "Road Trip," featured former Perfect Pussy vocalist Meredith Graves and Yeah Yeah Yeahs guitarist Nick Zinner. Hassan began her solo project, Esya, in 2019. She released her first solo album in 2026.

In June 2017, Thompson announced the introduction recordings/sketches of her solo project, Bashan, formed over several years whilst recording and touring extensively with Savages. She also worked with filmmaker and director Nick Ebeling, completing her first score for a 2016 American documentary film Along For The Ride, which premiered at Venice Film Festival in 2016.

In 2025, Milton started to release music under the stage name, Goddess. Her self-titled debut studio album, Goddess, was released on 30 May 2025 via Bella Union.

== Members ==
- Jehnny Beth – vocals
- Gemma Thompson – guitar
- Ayse Hassan – bass
- Fay Milton – drums

== Discography ==
=== Studio albums ===
Year	Details	Peak chart positions					Sales
Year	Details	UK	FRA	GER	NED	US	Sales
2013	Silence Yourself: Released: 6 May 2013; Label: Matador; Format: CD, vinyl, digital download	19	—	—	75	70	US: 43,000
2016	Adore Life: Released: 22 January 2016; Label: Matador; Format: CD, vinyl, digital download	26	57	53	39	99	
"—" denotes releases that did not chart.

=== Collaborative albums ===
- Words to the Blind (2014) (with Bo Ningen)
- In What I'm Seeing; The Sun (2015) (with A Dead Forest Index)

=== Extended plays ===
- I Am Here Live EP (2012)

=== Singles ===
- "Flying To Berlin" / "Husbands" (2012)
- "She Will" (2013)
- "Shut Up" (2013)
- "Husbands" (2013)
- "Fuckers" / "Dream Baby Dream" (2014)
- "The Answer" (2015)
- "T.I.W.Y.G" (2015)
- "Adore" (2016)
- "Surrender - Trentemøller Remix" (2016)

=== Music videos ===
Title	Year	Director	Album
"Shut Up"	2013	Giorgio Testi	Silence Yourself
"Husbands"	2013	John Minton	Silence Yourself
"Marshal Dear"	2013	Gergely Wootsch	Silence Yourself
"Strife"	2014	Antoine Carlier	Silence Yourself
"Fuckers"	2014	Giorgio Testi	"Fuckers"/"Dream Baby Dream"
"The Answer"	2015	Giorgio Testi	Adore Life
"Adore"	2016	Anders Malmberg	Adore Life

=== Film credits ===
- 2015 – "Husbands", end credits, Ex Machina.

== Awards and nominations ==
Year	Organisation	Award	Result
2012	BBC Sound of 2013	Sound of 2013	Nominated
2013	Mercury Prize 2013	Barclaycard Mercury Prize	Shortlisted
2016	Mercury Prize 2016	Hyundai Mercury Prize	Shortlisted
