= Armand Berton (politician) =

French politician

Armand Berton (12 March 1859, Genté - 4 March 1916, Crozant, Creuse) was a French politician.

Initially working as an avoué, he then became a farmer in Crozant. A militant radical, he edited the journal La Creuse radicale. He was mayor of Crozant and conseiller d'arrondissement before becoming deputy for Creuse between 1898 and 1902 with the radical-socialist grouping. Beaten in 1902, he became president of the tribunal de première instance in Vigan, then in Tournon and Ancenis.

== Sources ==
- "Armand Berton", in Dictionnaire des parlementaires français (1889-1940), Jean Jolly (ed.), PUF, 1960
