= Goddess (Goddess album) =

Studio album by Goddess
- Released: 30 May 2025
- Length: 39:55
- Label: Bella Union

Singles from Goddess
- 1. "Shadows" Released: 19 March 2025; 2. "Animal" Released: 29 April 2025

Goddess is the debut studio album by Fay Milton, who is best known for being the drummer of English rock band Savages. It was released under the stage name, Goddess, on 30 May 2025, through Bella Union in CD, LP and digital formats.

== Background ==
Goddess consists of ten tracks ranging between two and seven minutes each, with a total runtime of approximately forty minutes. The first single of the album, "Shadows", was released on 19 March 2025. It features Ex:Re as the featured performer alongside pianist Hinako Omori and Milton's Savages bandmate Ayse Hassan. Goddess incorporates elements of dream pop, post-punk, indie rock and electronica. The second single, "Animal", was released on 29 April 2025, featuring Delilah Holliday.

== Reception ==
Professional ratings
Review scores
Source	Rating
Mojo	3/5 stars
Uncut	6/10 stars

Stephen Dalton of Uncut described the album as "an ambitious collaborative affair showcasing female and non-binary musicians," and rated it six out of ten.

Stevie Chick, writing for Mojo, noted in his review that "as always with such projects, Goddess flies or falls on what these collaborators bring to the table, but the material here is as strong as it is varied," giving it a rating of three stars.

The Quietus' Tariq Goddard remarked, "Goddess doesn't stick to one style, and though there are echoes of Gibbons, Del Rey and Sade, the album's coherence comes from its themes and overall mood and not by remaining within a single niche."

== Track listing ==
Goddess track listing
No.	Title	Length
1.	"Little Dark" (featuring Shingai)	4:56
2.	"Shadows" (featuring Ex:Re)	4:14
3.	"Animal" (featuring Delilah Holliday)	3:21
4.	"Fuckboy" (featuring Salvia)	3:08
5.	"Golden" (featuring Shadow Stevie)	3:35
6.	"Bad Child" (featuring Isabel Muñoz-Newsome)	3:27
7.	"Darling Boulevard" (featuring Bess Atwell)	3:18
8.	"Diamond Dust" (featuring Izzy Bee Phillips)	3:59
9.	"Bounce" (featuring Grove)	2:51
10.	"22nd Century" (featuring Harriet Rock)	7:06
Total length:		39:55
