= Péreuil =

- Part of Val-des-Vignes
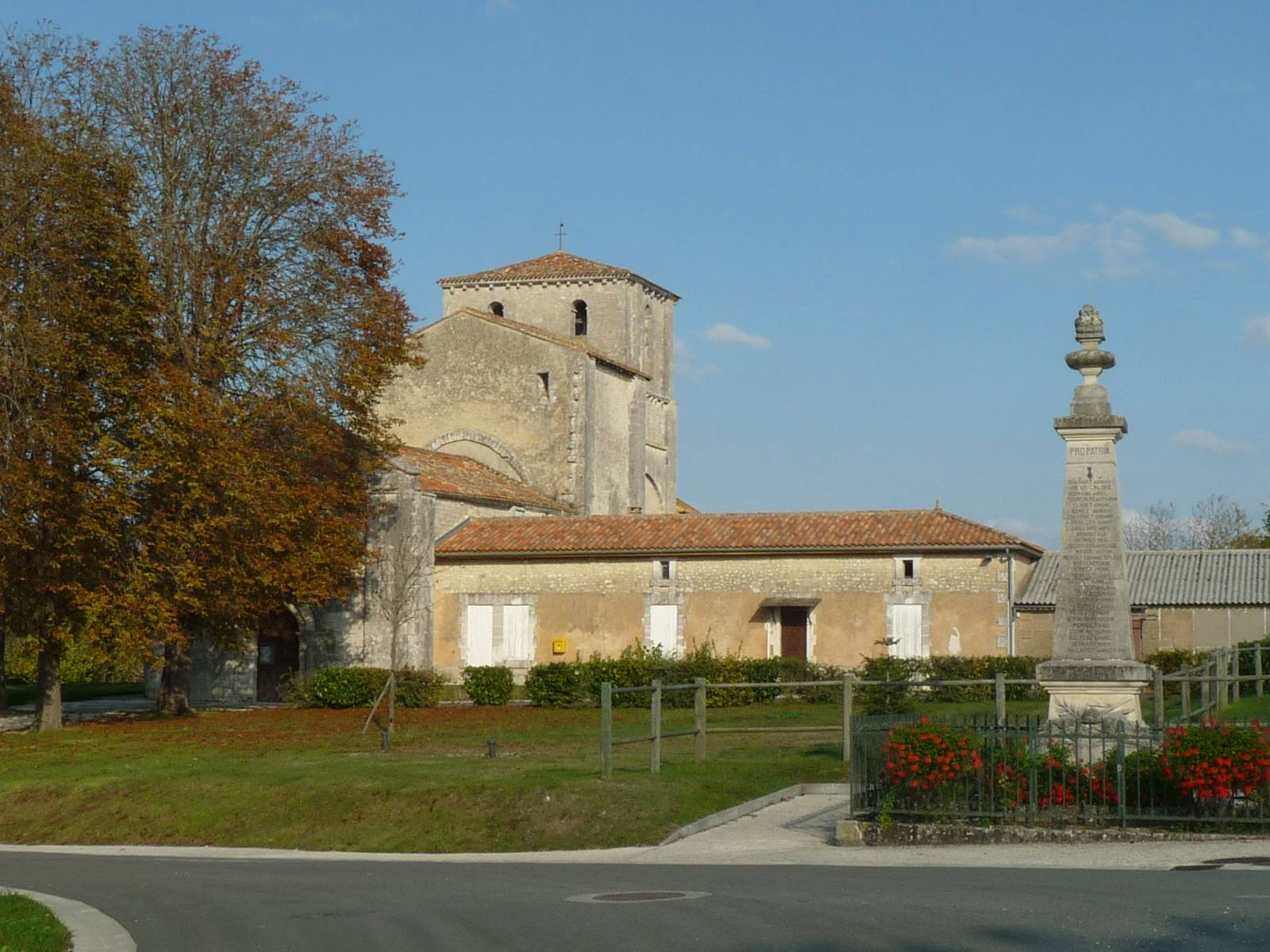
- Location of Péreuil
- Location within France Location within Nouvelle-Aquitaine
- Coordinates: 45°28′56″N 0°01′17″W
- Country: France
- Region: Nouvelle-Aquitaine
- Department: Charente
- Arrondissement: Angoulême
- Canton: Blanzac-Porcheresse
- Commune: Val-des-Vignes
- Area^{1}: 17.18 km^{2} (6.63 sq mi)
- Elevation: 89 m (292 ft)
- Highest elevation: 153 m (502 ft)
- Lowest elevation: 47 m (154 ft)
- Population (2018): 282
  - Density: 16.4/km^{2} (42.5/sq mi)
- Time zone: UTC+01:00 (CET)
  - Summer (DST): UTC+02:00 (CEST)
- Postal code: 16250
- ^{1} French Land Register data, which excludes lakes, ponds, glaciers > 1 km^{2} (0.386 sq mi or 247 acres) and river estuaries.

Péreuil (French pronunciation: [peʁœj]) is a former commune in the Charente department in southwestern France. On 1 January 2016, it was merged into the new commune Val-des-Vignes.

== Population ==
Historical population

Year	Pop.	±% p.a.
1793	794	—
1821	1,090	+1.14%
1846	832	−1.07%
1872	722	−0.54%
1901	589	−0.70%
1926	529	−0.43%
1946	479	−0.50%
1962	487	+0.10%

Year	Pop.	±% p.a.
1968	446	−1.46%
1975	418	−0.92%
1982	385	−1.17%
1990	410	+0.79%
1999	393	−0.47%
2008	394	+0.03%
2018	282	−3.29%

Source: EHESS and INSEE (2018)

== See also ==
- Communes of the Charente department
