= Jehnny Beth =

French actress and singer (born 1984)

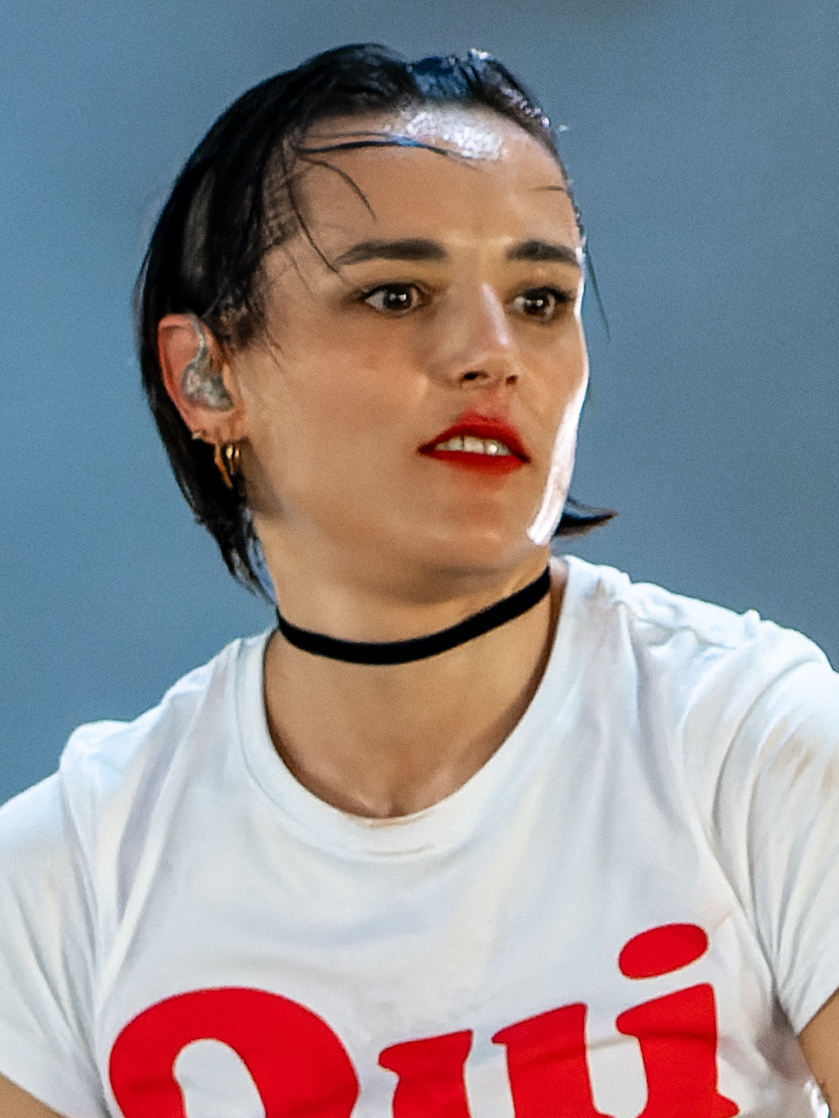
- Jehnny Beth in 2022

Background information
- Also known as: Camille Berthomier de Poitiers; Camouille Berthomouille
- Born: Camille Berthomier; 24 December 1984 (age 41); Poitiers, France
- Genres: Post-punk revival; noise rock; indie rock
- Occupations: Musician, singer-songwriter, actress
- Instruments: Vocals, guitar, keyboards
- Years active: 2004–present
- Labels: Pop Noire, Matador
- Formerly of: Savages; John & Jehn
- Website: www.jehnnybeth.com

Jehnny Beth (born Camille Berthomier, 24 December 1984) is a French musician and actress originally from Poitiers and, since 2006, based in London, England and Paris. She came to notability within Europe as a member of indie rock duo John & Jehn, and globally as frontwoman of the English post-punk revival band Savages. Her debut solo album To Love Is to Live was released to critical acclaim in June 2020. She has also collaborated with artists such as Trentemøller, Julian Casablancas, Tindersticks, Gorillaz, Noel Gallagher, Romy Madley Croft of the xx, Idles and Bobby Gillespie of Primal Scream. In 2021, she released a duet album with Gillespie,Utopian Ashes, which received favourable reviews.

In addition to her music career, Beth has played in several films including An Impossible Love in 2018, for which she received a nomination for the Best Female Newcomer at the 2019 Cesar Awards, and the 2023 film Anatomy of a Fall.

== Early life ==
Jehnny Beth was born in Poitiers, Vienne, France, to Catholic theater-director parents. Describing them, she said they "were keen to impress the importance of academic study on her and her sister". She had her first music instructors, a pair of jazz musicians, to learn piano and sing at the age of around 8, Chet Baker's songs in English. Her theatrical and musical career started at an early age when she played the title role in Henrik Ibsen's Peer Gynt and performed her first piano recital at 10. She was trained in dramatic arts at the conservatoire de Poitiers.

In late 2006, she moved to London with fellow John & Jehn member Nicolas Congé (aka Johnny Hostile) to pursue their career as a duo.

== Music career ==
=== John and Jehn ===
Beth met fellow musician Nicolas Congé and formed John & Jehn in France in 2006. They released two albums including their self-titled debut album, which received favourable reviews. The band also includes Savages' founding member Gemma Thompson on keyboards and guitar.

=== Savages ===
Originally formed in 2011 by Thompson and bassist Ayse Hassan, Beth became the vocalist of the band after Hostile turned down Thompson's request to front the band. The band gained commercial success with their debut album, Silence Yourself, which peaked at number 19 on the UK albums chart. Adore Life was released in 2016. Both albums were nominated for the Mercury Prize, in 2013 and 2016 respectively.

=== Solo ===
In 2015, Beth took part in the "David Bowie Is ..." exhibition by performing live some of Bowie's hits, including "Space Oddity" and "The Man Who Sold the World". On 27 June 2016, Beth performed live solo to open for PJ Harvey at the Eden Project in Cornwall, England. On 11 February 2017, Beth played her first full solo (piano) performance at Grauzone Festival in The Hague, The Netherlands.

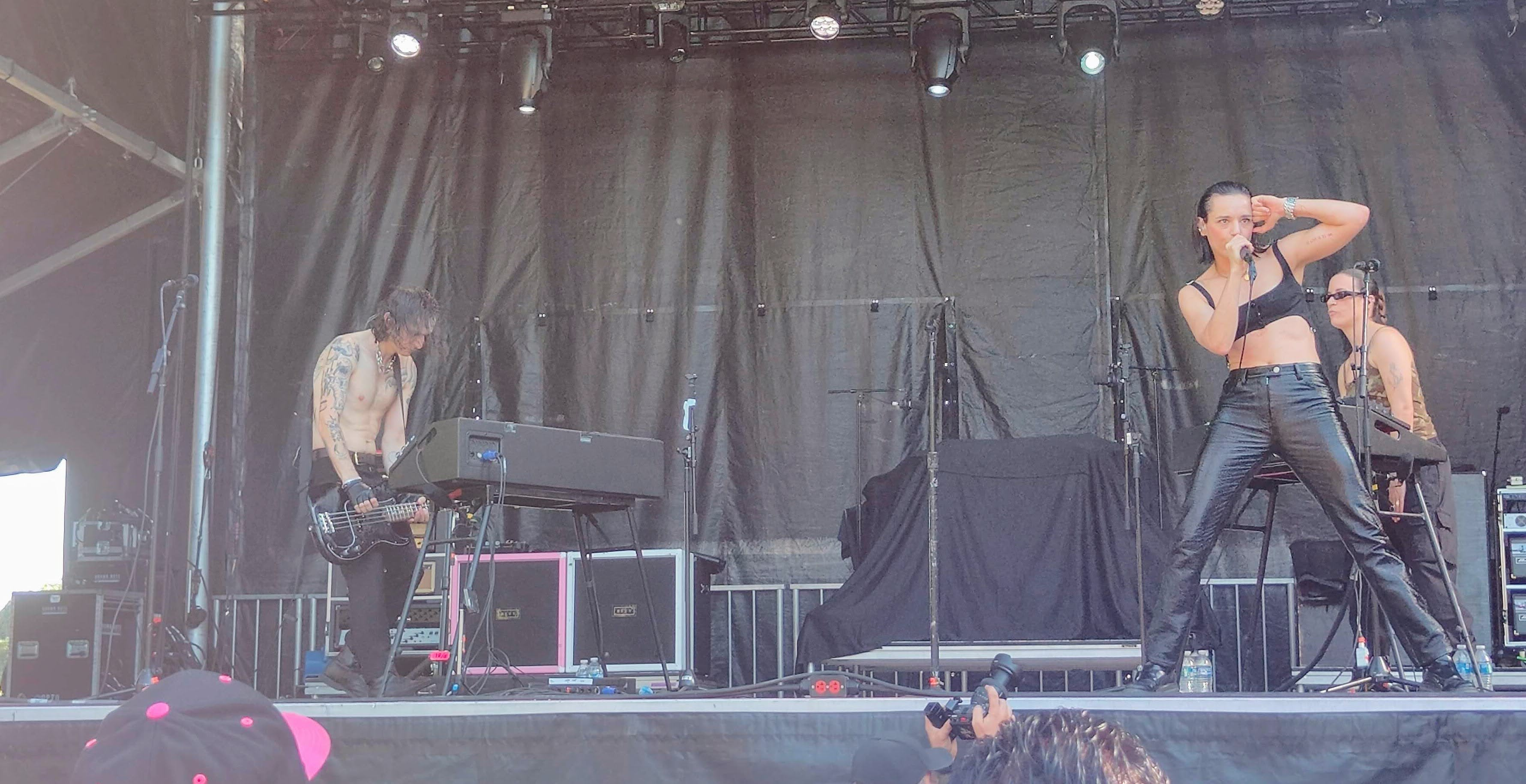
Jehnny Beth performing at Aftershock 2023.

In June 2020, Beth released To Love Is to Live, her first solo album – or "personal" album as she refers to it. It featured collaborations with singer Joe Talbot of Idles, arranger and producer Atticus Ross (a frequent collaborator of Trent Reznor), and singer Romy Madley Croft of the xx. Croft recorded backing vocals on the song "We Will Sin Together" which was promoted as a single. The album was widely acclaimed by critics. Videos were shot to promote the singles "I'm the Man", "Flower", "Heroine", and "We Will Sin Together". Beth's YouTube channel also includes a concert performed at the BBC Radio 6 Music Festival in London, at the Roundhouse prior to the release of the album.

On August 29, 2025, Beth released her second solo studio album, You Heartbreaker, You, via Fiction Records. In January 2026 she performed at a David Bowie tribute night at the British Museum.

=== Collaborations ===
In 2015, Danish electronic music producer and multi-instrumentalist Trentemøller released the album Fixion, including "River in Me" and "Complicated" with Beth on vocals. Trentemøller has described Beth's voice as "intense and unique". In 2015, Beth and the Strokes front man Julian Casablancas recorded a duet and released the single "Boy/Girl" (which was a cover version of Sort Sol and Lydia Lunch). In 2016, she duetted with Primal Scream for a live performance of "Some Velvet Morning" at the Bristol's Downs festival. That year, she recorded vocals for "We Are Dreamers" on Tindersticks's album The Waiting Room. On 13 March, Beth joined the xx onstage to perform "Infinity" together at O2 Academy Brixton, London. On 23 March, Beth was announced to be the featured artist for "We Got the Power", Gorillaz's second single from album Humanz. The song also included former Oasis member Noel Gallagher in backing vocals. On 5 May 2017, they performed the song live on The Graham Norton Show.

Beth and Hostile wrote the score for the documentary film XY Chelsea in 2019. The 23 songs were released under the banner of "XY Chelsea -original soundtrack composed and performed by Johnny Hostile and Jehnny Beth", on double LP vinyl on the website of their label Pop Noire. "Let it Out" was the single featuring Beth on vocals released ahead of the album. In 2020, Beth recorded vocals on the song "Ne Touche pas Moi" for Idles on their album Ultra Mono.

In 2021, she released Utopian Ashes, a duet album with Bobby Gillepsie; it was issued under the banner of both artists "Bobby Gillepsie and Jehnny Beth". Utopian Ashes was met with generally positive reviews from music critics. At Metacritic, which assigns a normalized rating out of 100 to reviews from professional publications, the album received an average score of 80, based on 14 reviews, indicating "generally favorable reviews". Two videos featuring Beth and Gillespie were shot to accompany the singles "Chase it Down" and "Remember We Were Lovers" and uploaded on YouTube.

== Acting ==
Beth played the lead role in the 2005 French mystery film Through the Forest directed by Jean-Paul Civeyrac. She also played a role as Marie-Jeanne in a 2009 horror French film Sodium Babies. In 2018 she played a role in the film An Impossible Love by director Catherine Corsini: Beth then received a nomination for the "Best Female Newcomer" at the 2019 Cesar Awards which is the national film award of France.

== Writing ==
Beth published a book titled C.A.L.M: 12 erotic short stories with Johnny Hostile in June 2020. The book included film noir stories written by Beth with photographs taken by Hostile. It was presented as a "manifesto in the form of erotic photography, monologues and dialogues, Johnny Hostile's stimulating photography punctuates Jehnny Beth's seductive prose". The full collection of Hostile's photography is featured in a limited-edition hard cover art book title C.A.L.M: Crimes Against Love Memories. A fanzine with a different content, also titled Calm, was also issued.

== Radio host and TV host ==
Beth ran her own Beats 1 radio programme, Start Making Sense, which premiered on 12 April 2016. In 2020, she also started to present a 60 minute TV show on European channel Arte, titled Echoes with Jehnny Beth, featuring discussions with musicians and live performances of bands; all the episodes of Echoes with Jehnny Beth are available on YouTube worldwide.

== Producing ==
In 2011, Beth founded the record label "Pop Noire" with Johnny Hostile and artist director Antoine Carlier. Their label, based in Paris, features several French and International acts on their roster.

== Personal life ==
Beth has been in a relationship with Johnny Hostile since 2006. She is bisexual, stating that "I’ve been a bisexual since a very young age."

== Discography ==
=== John & Jehn ===
- John & Jehn (2008)
- Time for the Devil (2010)

=== Savages ===
- Silence Yourself (2013)
- Adore Life (2016)

=== Solo ===
- To Love Is to Live (2020)
- You Heartbreaker, You (2025)

=== Bobby Gillespie and Jehnny Beth ===
- Utopian Ashes (2021)

== Filmography ==
Year	Title	Role	Note
2005	Through the Forest	Armelle	Credited as Camille Berthomier
2009	Sodium Babies	Marie-Jeanne	Credited as Camille Berthomier
2018	An Impossible Love	Chantal	
2019	Oh les filles!	Herself	
2021	Paris, 13th District	Amber Sweet	
2021	Kaamelott: The First Chapter	Wulfstan	
2022	En même temps	Nina	
2022	Don Juan	The stage director	
2022	Astrakan	Marie	
2023	Stranger		Short film; also co-director
2023	Anatomy of a Fall	Marge	
2023	Split	Eve	Miniseries
2025	Hostage	Adrienne Pelletier	Miniseries
