= Val-des-Vignes =

- Commune
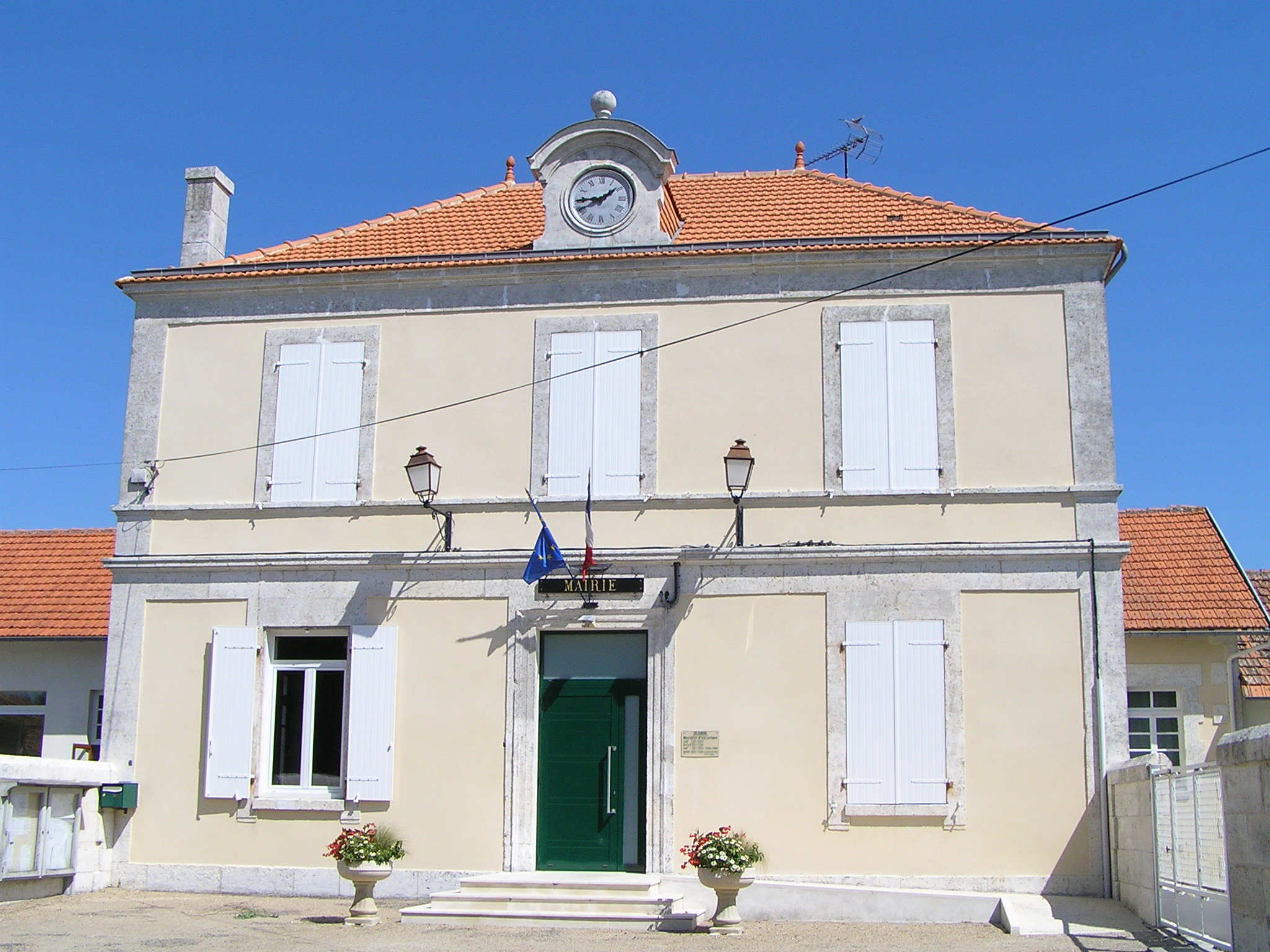
- The town hall in Jurignac
- Location of Val-des-Vignes
- Location within France Location within Nouvelle-Aquitaine
- Coordinates: 45°31′59″N 0°02′13″W
- Country: France
- Region: Nouvelle-Aquitaine
- Department: Charente
- Arrondissement: Cognac
- Canton: Charente-Sud
- Intercommunality: CC 4B Sud-Charente

Government
  - Mayor (2020–2026): Guy Decelle
- Area^{1}: 50.66 km^{2} (19.56 sq mi)
- Population (2023): 1,352
  - Density: 26.69/km^{2} (69.12/sq mi)
- Time zone: UTC+01:00 (CET)
  - Summer (DST): UTC+02:00 (CEST)
- INSEE/Postal code: 16175 /16250
- ^{1} French Land Register data, which excludes lakes, ponds, glaciers > 1 km^{2} (0.386 sq mi or 247 acres) and river estuaries.

Val-des-Vignes (French pronunciation: [val de viɲ]) is a commune in the Charente department of southwestern France. The municipality was established on 1 January 2016 and consists of the former communes of Aubeville, Jurignac, Mainfonds and Péreuil.

== See also ==
- Communes of the Charente department
