= Orties =

French hip-hop group

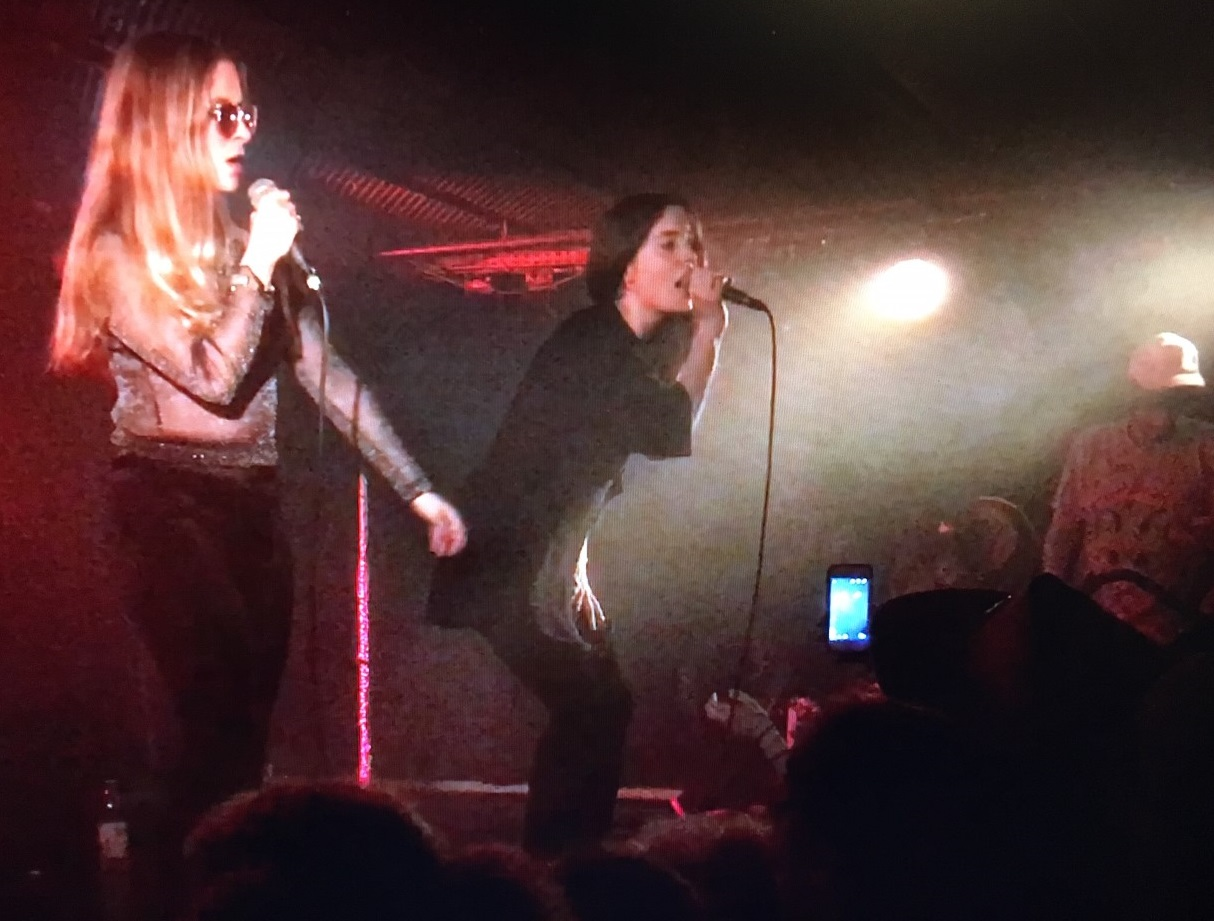

Background information
- Origin: Bures-sur-Yvette, Essonne, France
- Genres: French hip hop, Gothic rock
- Years active: 2009-2016
- Label: Nuun Records
- Members: Antha; Alexandra Dezzi (Kincy)

Orties was a French hip-hop band from Bures-Sur-Yvette in Essonne, composed of twin sisters Antha and Alexandra Dezzi (the latter known by her pseudonym "Kincy"). It was active between 2009 and 2016.

== Biography ==
Orties, a musical duo from Bures-sur-Yvette, a suburb of Paris, started their musical careers at the age of 15. Taking inspiration from Charles Baudelaire's Les Fleurs du mal, they adopted the name "Orties" (meaning "nettles" in French). Initially, the band explored gothic rock, but their sound evolved to incorporate rap music with French lyrics. They described this fusion of genres as the "Nouvelle Chanson Francaise" (New French [Sound] (lit. Song)).

In October 2010, Orties released their first EP titled La Boum through Believe Music. One of their controversial tracks, "Plus putes que toutes les putes" (Bitchier than any bitch), remixed by Lecter from Booty Call Records, gained attention when it was included in Skrillex's essential mix on BBC Radio.

In February 2013, Orties released their debut album, Sextape, through Nuun Records.

== Critical reception ==
Orties garnered support from various media outlets, including Technikart and mainstream publications such as Elle Magazine and Glamour. In June 2016, they were featured in a four-page spread in Les Inrockuptibles' special issue, with acclaimed author Michel Houellebecq as the main contributor.

On 23 June 2016, Orties released a new single titled "SEXEDROGUEHORREUR," accompanied by a music video directed by Jean Bocheux. The single showcased their unique style and continued exploration of the Nouvelle Chanson Francaise genre.

Furthermore, Orties had plans to release their second album, also titled Nouvelle Chanson Francaise, in mid-2017, indicating their commitment to further develop and expand their musical endeavors.
