= Armand Berton (painter) =

French painter, engraver and illustrator

Armand Berton (16 September 1854, Paris – 1917) was a French painter, engraver and illustrator.

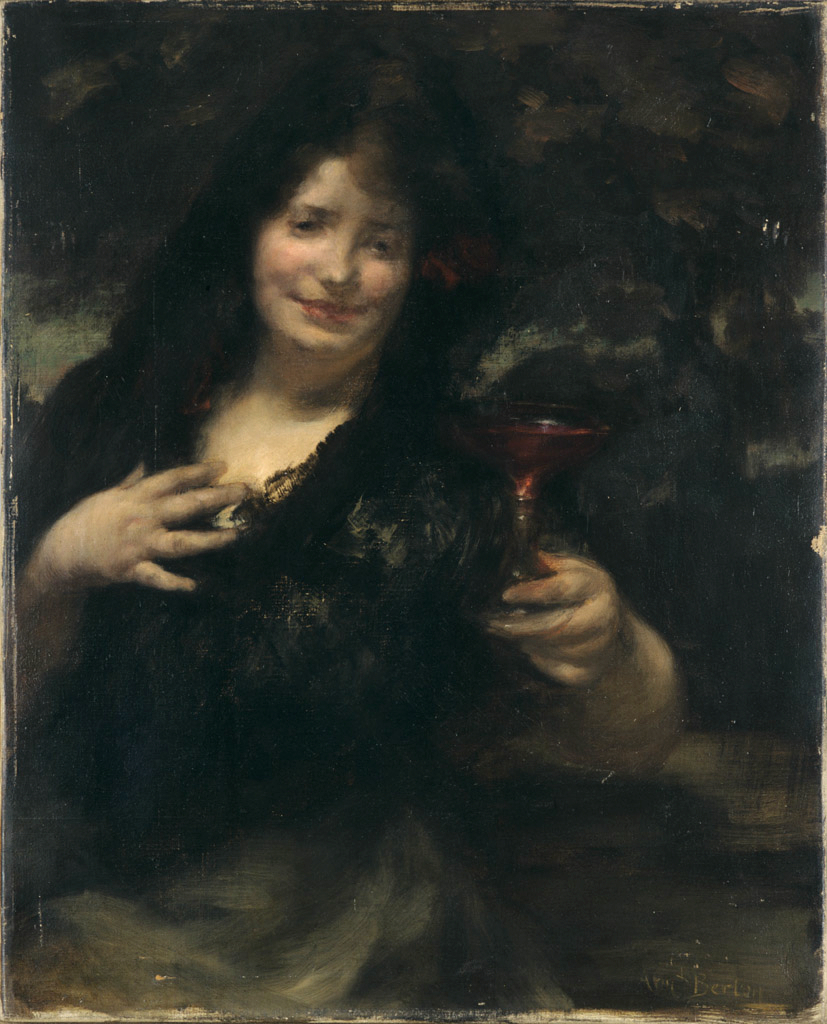
La coupe d'oubli

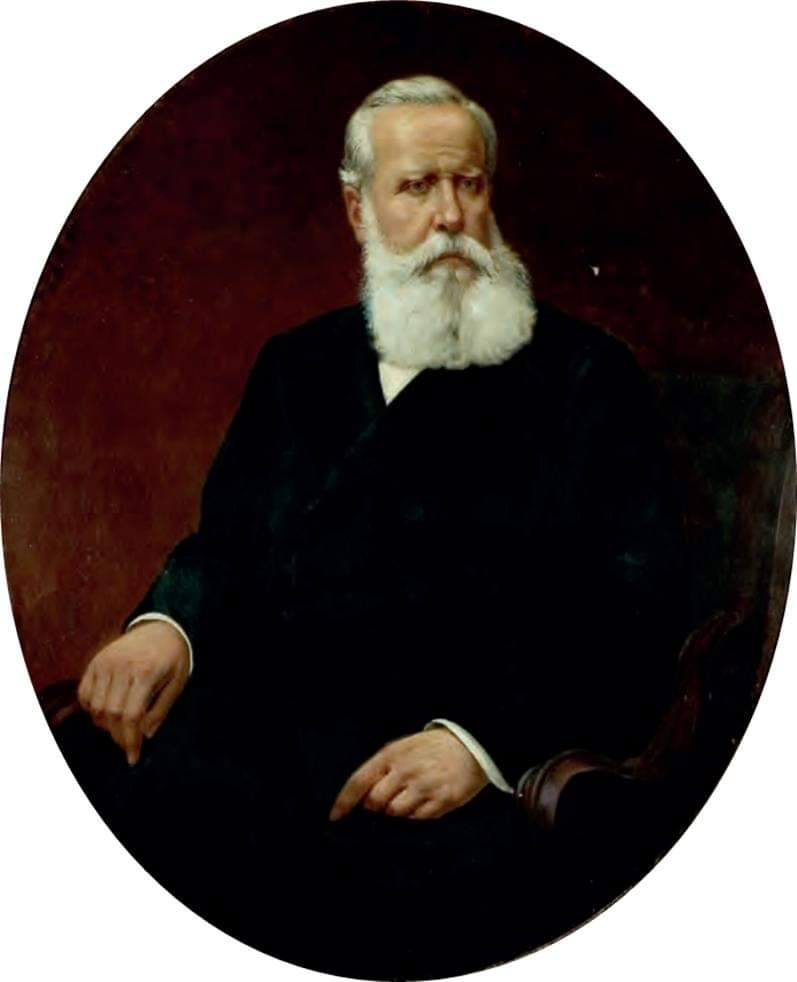
Pedro II of Brazil

== Bibliography ==
- Geneviève Monnier, Musée du Louvre, Cabinet des Dessins. Musée d'Orsay. Pastels du XIXe siècle, Inventaire des collections publiques françaises, Paris, 1985.
