= Aubeville =

- Part of Val-des-Vignes
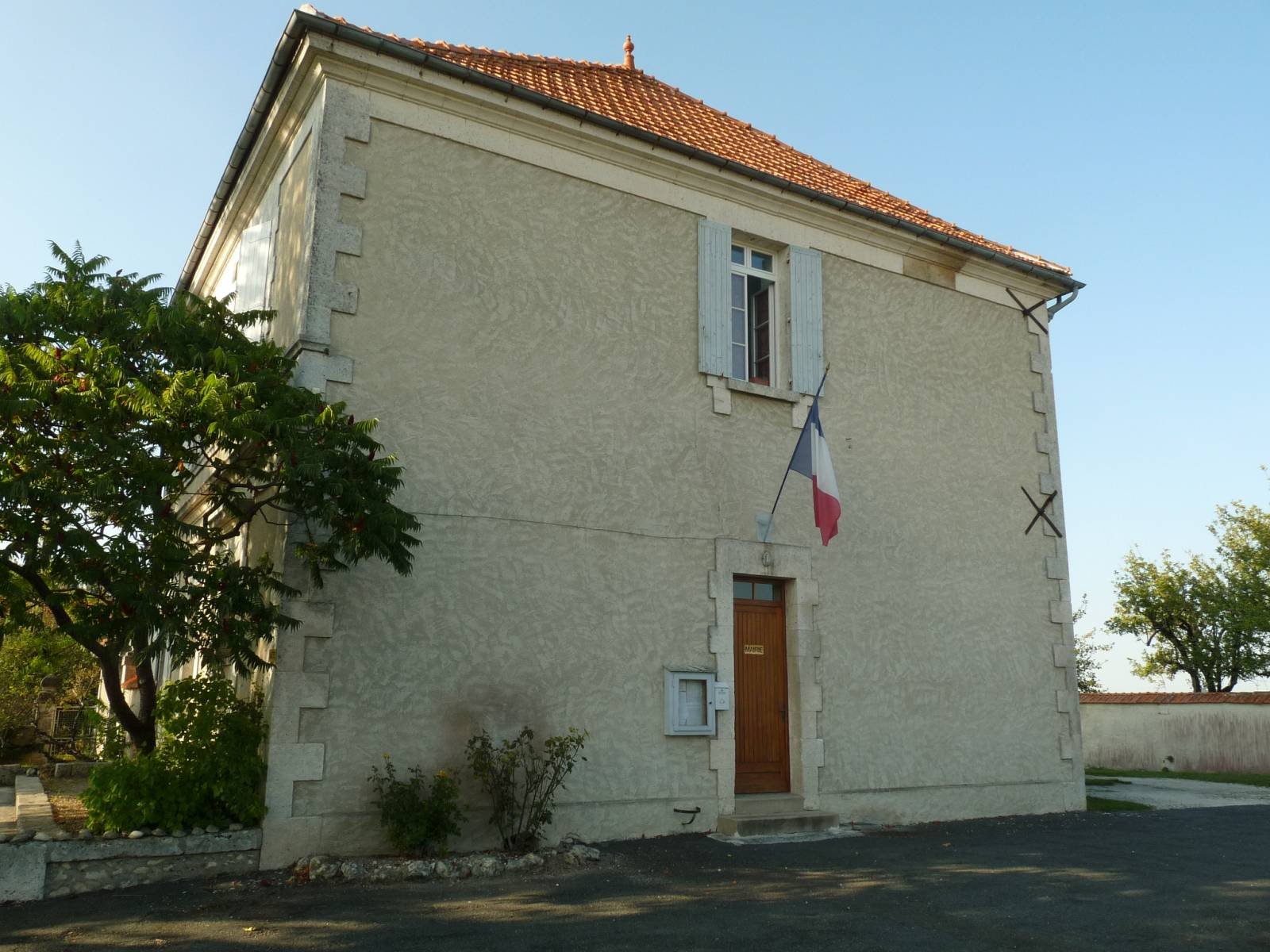
- Town hall
- Location of Aubeville
- Location within France Location within Nouvelle-Aquitaine
- Coordinates: 45°29′58″N 0°00′10″W
- Country: France
- Region: Nouvelle-Aquitaine
- Department: Charente
- Arrondissement: Angoulême
- Canton: Charente-Sud
- Commune: Val-des-Vignes
- Area^{1}: 8.22 km^{2} (3.17 sq mi)
- Elevation: 100 m (330 ft)
- Highest elevation: 153 m (502 ft)
- Lowest elevation: 51 m (167 ft)
- Population (2017): 142
  - Density: 17.3/km^{2} (44.7/sq mi)
- Time zone: UTC+01:00 (CET)
  - Summer (DST): UTC+02:00 (CEST)
- Postal code: 16250
- ^{1} French Land Register data, which excludes lakes, ponds, glaciers > 1 km^{2} (0.386 sq mi or 247 acres) and river estuaries.

Aubeville (French pronunciation: [obvil]) is a former commune in the Charente department in southwestern France. On 1 January 2016, it was merged into the new commune Val-des-Vignes.

== Population ==
Historical population

Year	Pop.	±% p.a.
1793	431	—
1821	462	+0.25%
1846	431	−0.28%
1872	341	−0.90%
1901	253	−1.02%
1926	266	+0.20%
1946	227	−0.79%
1962	198	−0.85%

Year	Pop.	±% p.a.
1968	195	−0.25%
1975	153	−3.41%
1982	139	−1.36%
1990	130	−0.83%
1999	142	+0.99%
2006	144	+0.20%
2017	144	+0.00%

Source: EHESS and INSEE (2017)

== See also ==
- Communes of the Charente department
