= John & Jehn =

French indie rock duo

- Origin: Angoulême, Mainfonds and Poitiers, France
- Genres: Lo-fi, indie rock
- Years active: 2006–present
- Labels: Faculty Music Media, Naïve Records
- Members: Jehnny Beth; Johnny Hostile
- Website: Official website

John & Jehn (also known as John and Jehn) are a lo-fi/indie rock duo from France, in which John and Jehn are respectively Nicolas Congé (a.k.a. Johnny Hostile) and Camille Berthomier (a.k.a. Jehnny Beth).

== History ==
John & Jehn started their musical career when the couple moved from their hometowns to London at the end of 2006. The first song they wrote together was "20 L 07". Their influences included Serge Gainsbourg, the Velvet Underground, Jean-Luc Godard, Gang of Four, John Fante, Joy Division, Jacques Brel and Johnny Cash. They released their debut album, nearly all of which was recorded in their bedroom, on indie label Faculty Music Media in April 2008, to critical acclaim.

After touring Europe, the pair returned to Angoulême in the summer of 2009 to build and record in their own studio, and to rehearse for their initial live shows as a quartet (supporting Franz Ferdinand in front of 8,000 people in Paris was their first). Their second studio album, Time for the Devil, was released on 28 March 2010. To support their second album on stage, John & Jehn were joined by Raphael Mura (from Underground Railroad) on drums and Maud-Elisa Mandeau (from Le Prince Miiaou) on guitar. For their UK tour, Gemma Thompson (from Hindley) was added on guitar.

In 2010, John & Jehn settled back in London. They toured Europe and appeared on the front cover of Artrocker magazine.

== Other projects ==
In 2005, Berthomier played the leading role in À travers la forêt. She also appeared as an actress in the 2009 film Sodium Babies.

In 2011, they created their own Pop Noire label, which aimed to release their new records and other artists produced by John in the John & Jehn studio in London. The first release, by the artist Lescop, was the track "La Foret" (produced by John and video by Jehn), issued in October 2011.

In October 2011, Berthomier (using her pseudonym Jehnny Beth) and Thompson formed the London-based post-punk band, Savages. Congé acts as Savages' producer.

== Members ==
- Nicolas Congé - vocals, guitars
- Camille Berthomier - vocals, guitars, bass, keyboards

Touring members

- Gemma Thompson - backing vocals, guitars, keyboards
- Niall 'Liquid K' Kavanagh - drums

== Discography ==
=== Studio albums ===
Year	Album information	Chart positions	
Year	Album information	US	UK
2008	John & Jehn: Released: 28 April 2008; Label: Faculty Music Media		
2010	Time for the Devil: Released: 29 March 2010; Label: Naïve Records		

=== Singles ===
Date	Single	Backed with	Record label	Format	Other details
2007	"My Friends"	"Make Your Mum Be Proud"	Phuckit	7"	1,000 only
2008	"20 L 07"	-	Faculty Music Media	digital	
2008	"Fear Fear Fear"	"Sister"	Faculty Music Media	7"	1,000 only
2010	"Time for the Devil"	-	Naïve Records	digital	
