= Salles-d'Angles =

- Commune
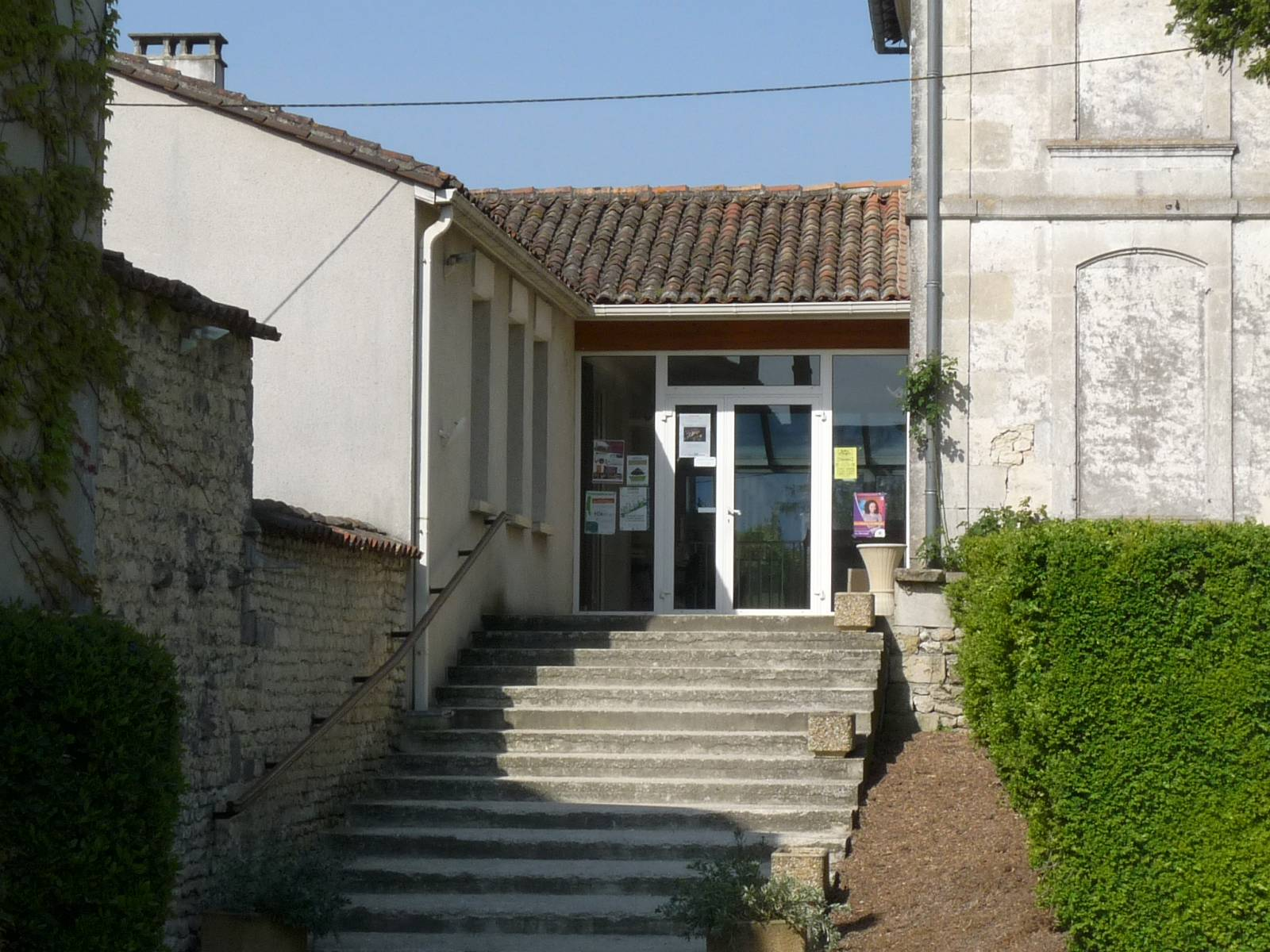
- The town hall in Salles-d'Angles

- Coat of arms
- Location of Salles-d'Angles
- Location within France Location within Nouvelle-Aquitaine
- Coordinates: 45°37′09″N 0°19′55″W
- Country: France
- Region: Nouvelle-Aquitaine
- Department: Charente
- Arrondissement: Cognac
- Canton: Charente-Champagne
- Intercommunality: CA Grand Cognac

Government
  - Mayor (2021–2026): Marcel Géron
- Area^{1}: 21.8 km^{2} (8.4 sq mi)
- Elevation: 46 m (151 ft)
- Highest elevation: 87 m (285 ft)
- Lowest elevation: 11 m (36 ft)
- Population (2023): 1,011
  - Density: 46.4/km^{2} (120/sq mi)
- Time zone: UTC+01:00 (CET)
  - Summer (DST): UTC+02:00 (CEST)
- INSEE/Postal code: 16359 /16130
- ^{1} French Land Register data, which excludes lakes, ponds, glaciers > 1 km^{2} (0.386 sq mi or 247 acres) and river estuaries.

Salles-d'Angles (French pronunciation: [sal dɑ̃ɡl]) is a commune in the Charente department in southwestern France.

== Population ==
Historical population
Year	Pop.	±% p.a.
1968	932	—
1975	991	+0.88%
1982	1,119	+1.75%
1990	1,225	+1.14%
1999	1,127	−0.92%
2007	1,092	−0.39%
2012	1,056	−0.67%
2017	1,026	−0.57%
2023	1,011	−0.25%
Source: INSEE

== See also ==
- Communes of the Charente department
