= Jurignac =

- Part of Val-des-Vignes
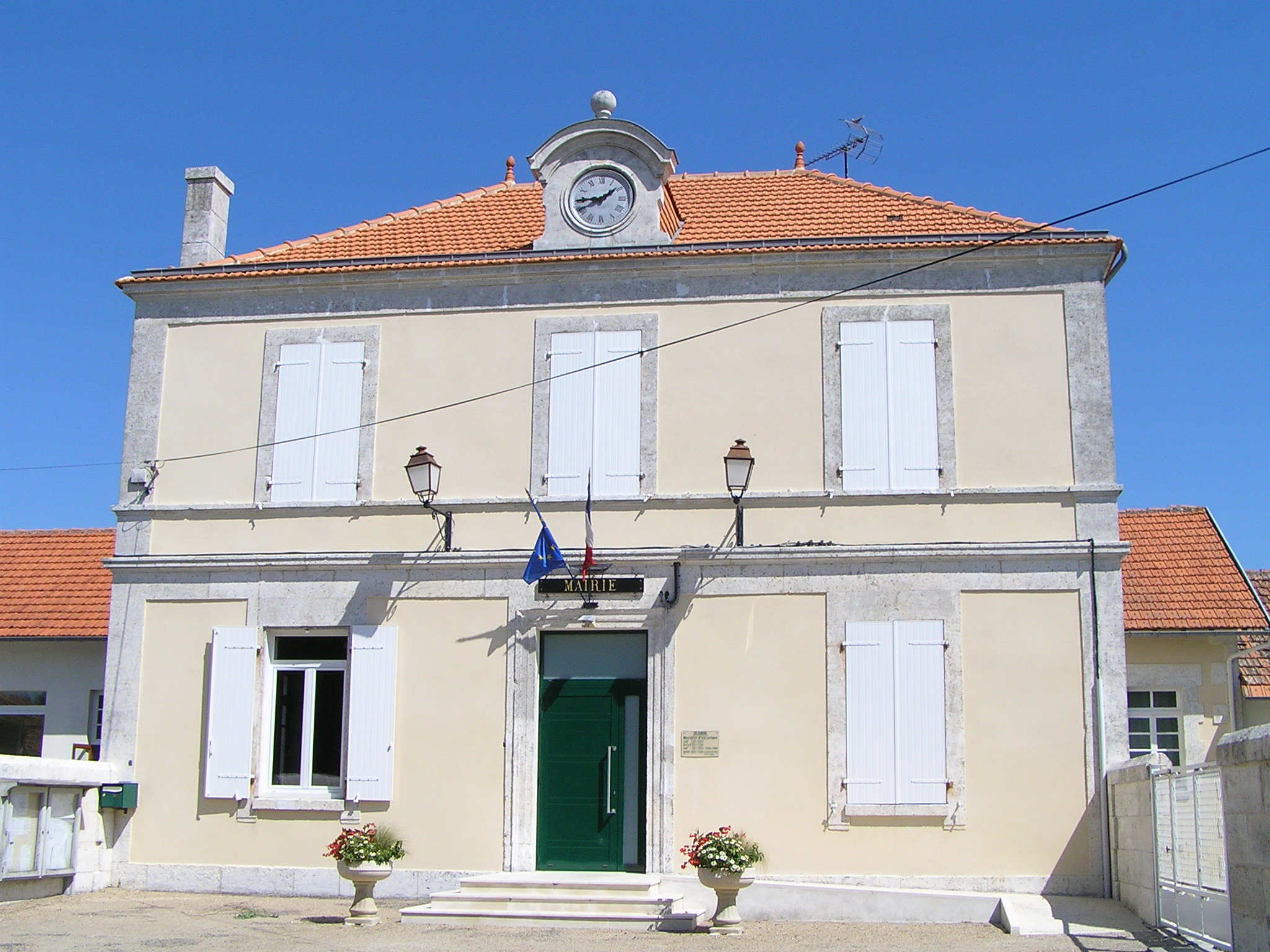
- Town hall
- Location of Jurignac
- Location within France Location within Nouvelle-Aquitaine
- Coordinates: 45°32′02″N 0°02′12″W
- Country: France
- Region: Nouvelle-Aquitaine
- Department: Charente
- Arrondissement: Angoulême
- Canton: Blanzac-Porcheresse
- Commune: Val-des-Vignes
- Area^{1}: 16.00 km^{2} (6.18 sq mi)
- Elevation: 130 m (430 ft)
- Highest elevation: 141 m (463 ft)
- Lowest elevation: 50 m (160 ft)
- Population (2018): 641
  - Density: 40.1/km^{2} (104/sq mi)
- Time zone: UTC+01:00 (CET)
  - Summer (DST): UTC+02:00 (CEST)
- Postal code: 16250
- ^{1} French Land Register data, which excludes lakes, ponds, glaciers > 1 km^{2} (0.386 sq mi or 247 acres) and river estuaries.

Jurignac (French pronunciation: [ʒyʁiɲak]) is a former commune in the Charente department in southwestern France. On 1 January 2016, it was merged into the new commune Val-des-Vignes.

== Population ==
Historical population

Year	Pop.	±% p.a.
1793	497	—
1821	685	+1.15%
1846	803	+0.64%
1872	850	+0.22%
1901	619	−1.09%
1926	554	−0.44%
1946	538	−0.15%
1962	545	+0.08%

Year	Pop.	±% p.a.
1968	523	−0.68%
1975	552	+0.77%
1982	499	−1.43%
1990	539	+0.97%
1999	501	−0.81%
2006	518	+0.48%
2018	641	+1.79%

Source: EHESS and INSEE (2018)

== Sights ==
The commune contains the distillery of the cognac Andre Duclos, a building from the late nineteenth century which is now a music hall. It is the only listed building in the commune. St. Peter's Church is the main place of worship.

== See also ==
- Communes of the Charente department
