= Juillac-le-Coq =

- Commune
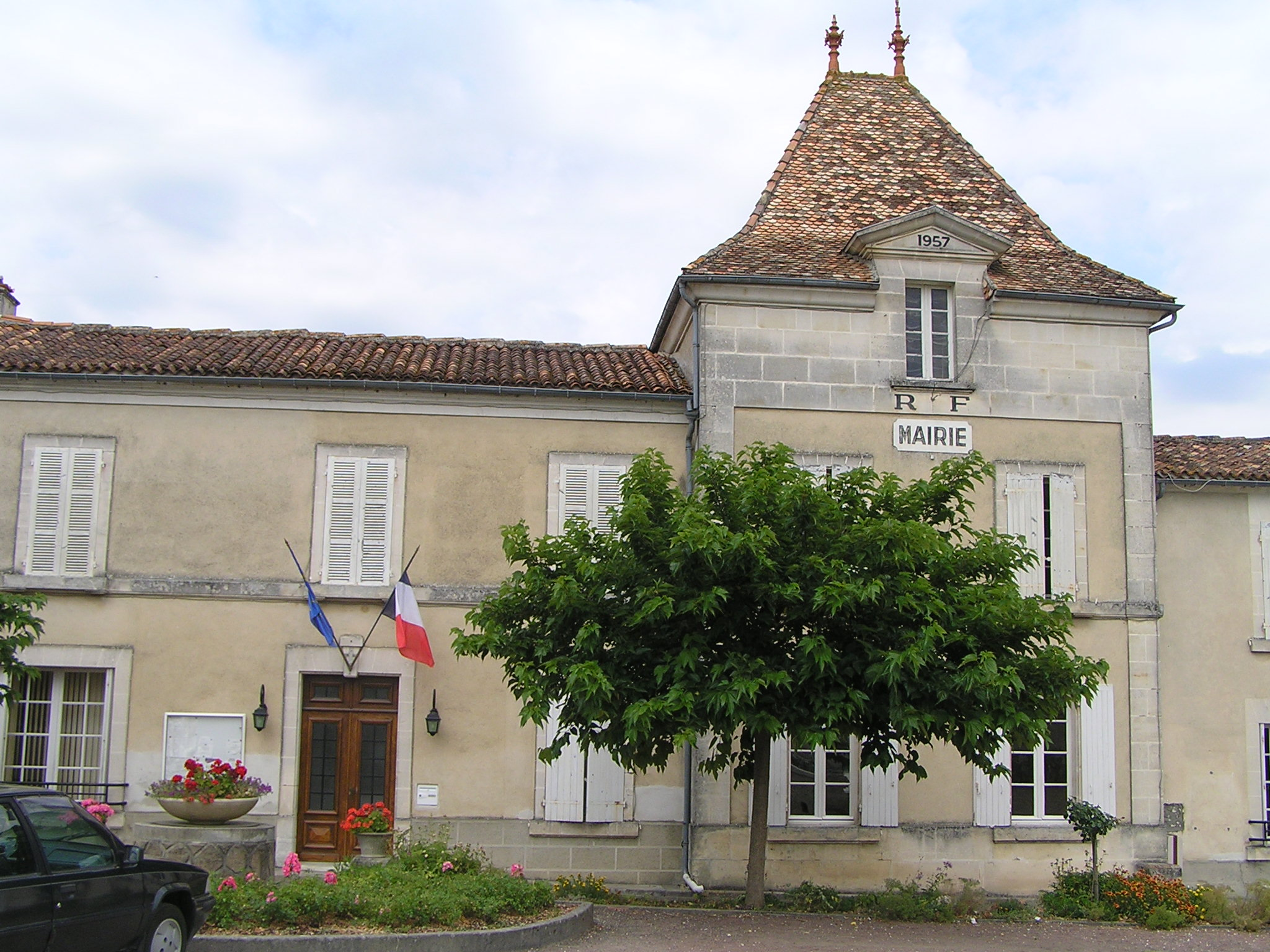
- Town hall
- Location of Juillac-le-Coq
- Location within France Location within Nouvelle-Aquitaine
- Coordinates: 45°35′24″N 0°15′35″W
- Country: France
- Region: Nouvelle-Aquitaine
- Department: Charente
- Arrondissement: Cognac
- Canton: Charente-Champagne
- Intercommunality: CA Grand Cognac

Government
  - Mayor (2020–2026): Brice Dezemerie
- Area^{1}: 14.54 km^{2} (5.61 sq mi)
- Elevation: 66 m (217 ft)
- Highest elevation: 131 m (430 ft)
- Lowest elevation: 26 m (85 ft)
- Population (2023): 653
  - Density: 44.9/km^{2} (116/sq mi)
- Time zone: UTC+01:00 (CET)
  - Summer (DST): UTC+02:00 (CEST)
- INSEE/Postal code: 16171 /16130
- ^{1} French Land Register data, which excludes lakes, ponds, glaciers > 1 km^{2} (0.386 sq mi or 247 acres) and river estuaries.

Juillac-le-Coq (French pronunciation: [ʒɥijak lə kɔk]) is a commune in the Charente department in southwestern France.

== Population ==
Historical population
| Year | Pop. | ±% p.a. |
|---|---|---|
| 1968 | 748 | — |
| 1975 | 673 | −1.50% |
| 1982 | 637 | −0.78% |
| 1990 | 684 | +0.89% |
| 1999 | 654 | −0.50% |
| 2007 | 669 | +0.28% |
| 2012 | 675 | +0.18% |
| 2017 | 649 | −0.78% |
| 2023 | 653 | +0.10% |
Source: INSEE

== See also ==
- Communes of the Charente department
