= Mainfonds =

- Part of Val-des-Vignes
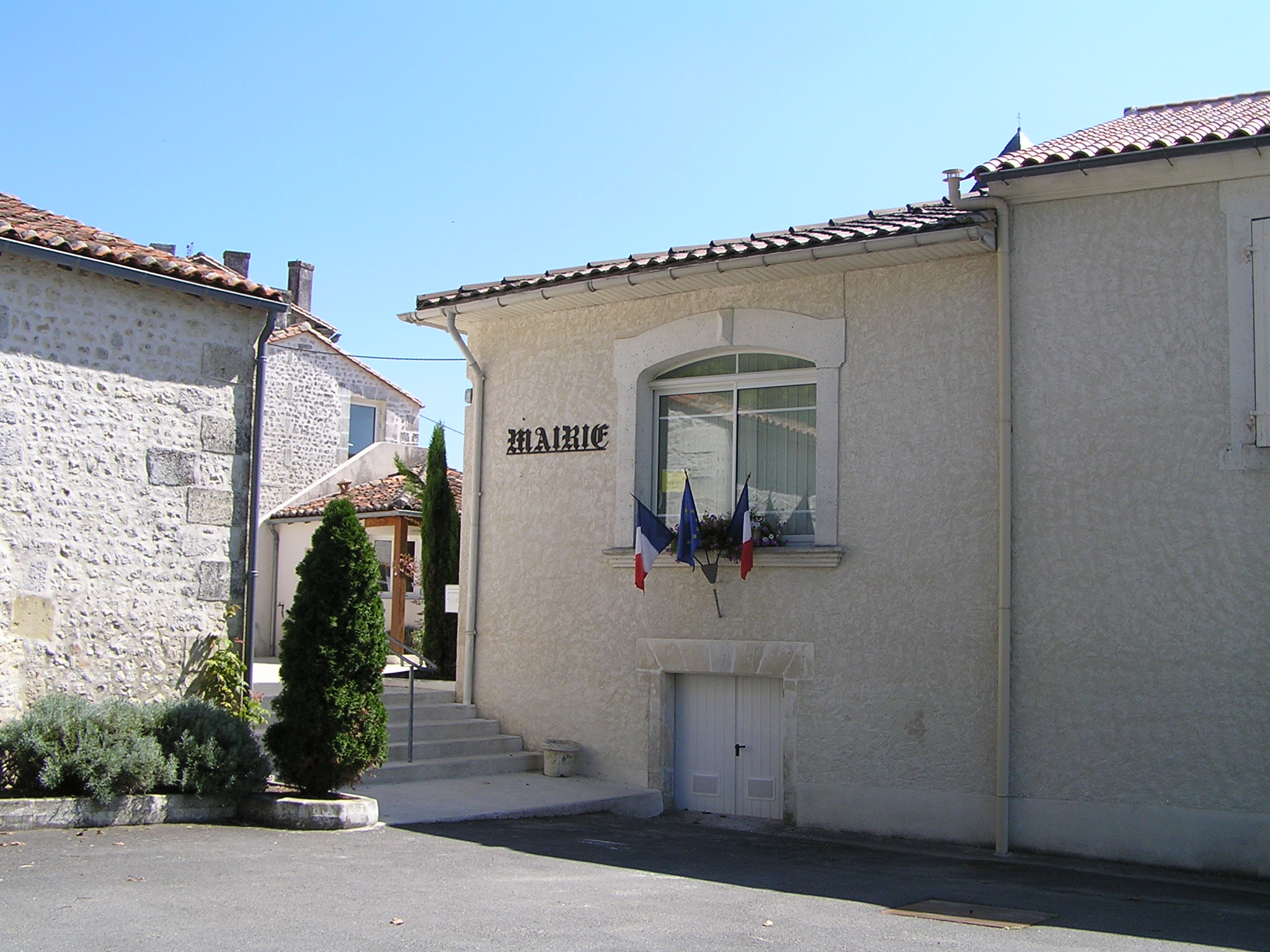
- Town hall
- Location of Mainfonds
- Location within France Location within Nouvelle-Aquitaine
- Coordinates: 45°31′08″N 0°01′12″E
- Country: France
- Region: Nouvelle-Aquitaine
- Department: Charente
- Arrondissement: Angoulême
- Canton: Blanzac-Porcheresse
- Commune: Val-des-Vignes
- Area^{1}: 9.26 km^{2} (3.58 sq mi)
- Elevation: 120 m (390 ft)
- Highest elevation: 154 m (505 ft)
- Lowest elevation: 65 m (213 ft)
- Population (2018): 118
  - Density: 12.7/km^{2} (33.0/sq mi)
- Time zone: UTC+01:00 (CET)
  - Summer (DST): UTC+02:00 (CEST)
- Postal code: 16250
- ^{1} French Land Register data, which excludes lakes, ponds, glaciers > 1 km^{2} (0.386 sq mi or 247 acres) and river estuaries.

Mainfonds (French pronunciation: [mɛ̃fɔ̃]) is a former commune in the Charente department in southwestern France. On 1 January 2016, it was merged into the new commune Val-des-Vignes.

== Population ==
Historical population

Year	Pop.	±% p.a.
1793	365	—
1821	362	−0.03%
1846	386	+0.26%
1872	386	+0.00%
1901	271	−1.21%
1926	227	−0.71%
1946	230	+0.07%

Year	Pop.	±% p.a.
1962	196	−0.99%
1968	199	+0.25%
1975	179	−1.50%
1982	166	−1.07%
1990	171	+0.37%
1999	142	−2.04%
2018	118	−0.97%

Source: EHESS and INSEE (2018)

== See also ==
- Communes of the Charente department
