= Genté =

- Commune
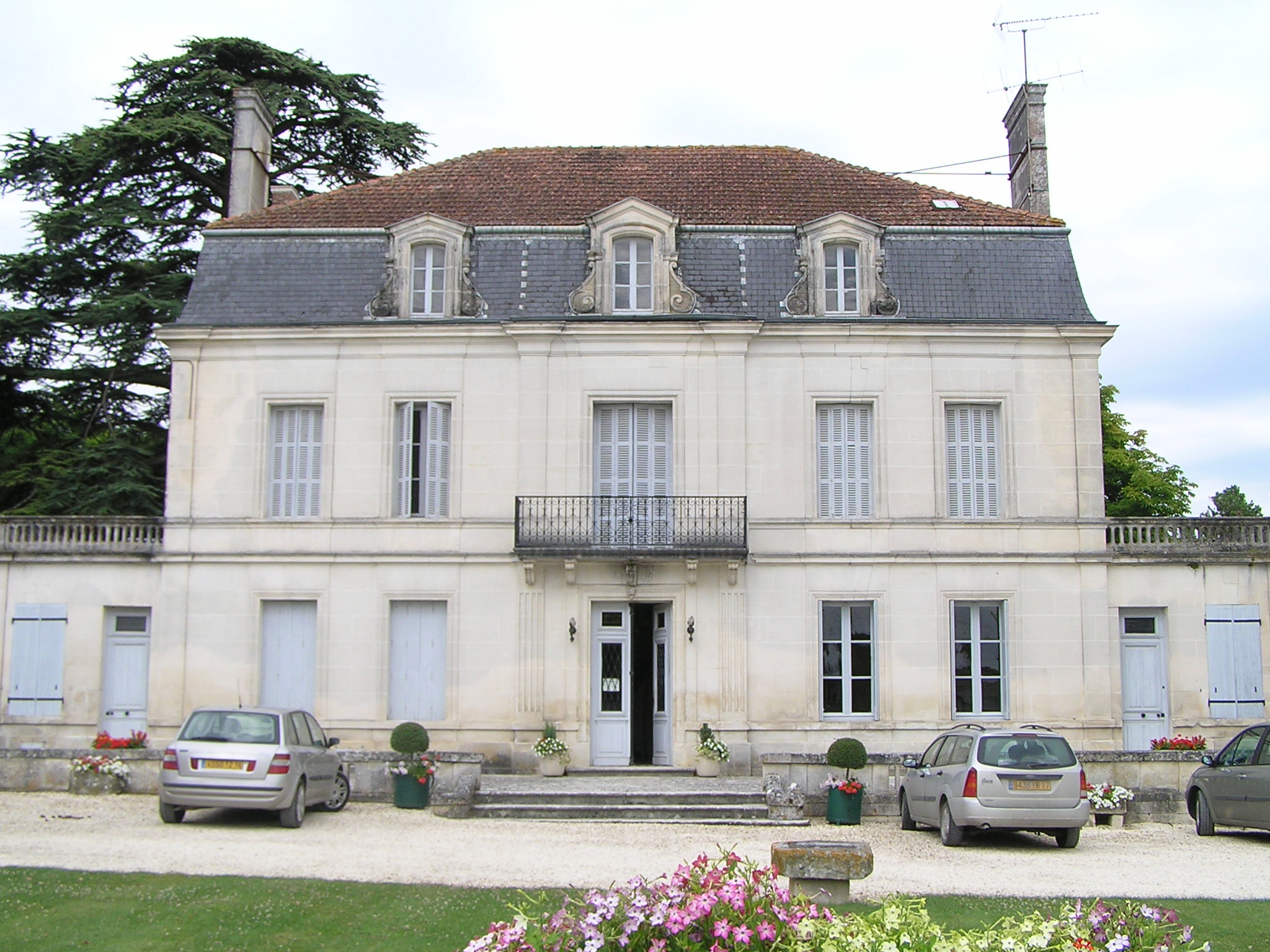
- Town hall

- Coat of arms
- Location of Genté
- Location within France Location within Nouvelle-Aquitaine
- Coordinates: 45°37′43″N 0°18′45″W
- Country: France
- Region: Nouvelle-Aquitaine
- Department: Charente
- Arrondissement: Cognac
- Canton: Charente-Champagne
- Intercommunality: CA Grand Cognac

Government
  - Mayor (2022–2026): Carmen Bernard
- Area^{1}: 11.59 km^{2} (4.47 sq mi)
- Elevation: 100 m (330 ft)
- Highest elevation: 98 m (322 ft)
- Lowest elevation: 18 m (59 ft)
- Population (2023): 924
  - Density: 79.7/km^{2} (206/sq mi)
- Time zone: UTC+01:00 (CET)
  - Summer (DST): UTC+02:00 (CEST)
- INSEE/Postal code: 16151 /16130
- ^{1} French Land Register data, which excludes lakes, ponds, glaciers > 1 km^{2} (0.386 sq mi or 247 acres) and river estuaries.

Genté (French pronunciation: [ʒɑ̃te]) is a commune in the Charente department in southwestern France.

== Population ==
Historical population
Year	Pop.	±% p.a.
1968	607	—
1975	694	+1.93%
1982	755	+1.21%
1990	851	+1.51%
1999	830	−0.28%
2007	877	+0.69%
2012	901	+0.54%
2017	884	−0.38%
2023	924	+0.74%
Source: INSEE

== See also ==
- Communes of the Charente department
