= Ultimate Success Today =

Studio album by Protomartyr
- Released: July 17, 2020
- Recorded: 2019
- Studio: Dreamland Recording Studios (Hurley, New York)
- Genres: Post-punk; noise rock; art rock
- Length: 40:07
- Label: Domino
- Producers: Protomartyr; David Tolomei

Protomartyr chronology
Consolation (2018)	Ultimate Success Today (2020)	Formal Growth in the Desert (2023)

Singles from Ultimate Success Today
- 1. "Processed by the Boys" Released: March 11, 2020; 2. "Worm in Heaven" Released: April 28, 2020; 3. "Michigan Hammers" Released: May 28, 2020

Ultimate Success Today is the fifth studio album by American post-punk band Protomartyr released on July 17, 2020 on Domino. Thematically inspired by lead singer Joe Casey's mid-life crisis in the wake of the band's debut being reissued, the album - conceived as a "valediction" of the band's first decade together - was recorded in 2019 at Dreamland Recording Studios in Hurley, New York with the help of producer David Tolomei. The sessions saw the band playing and recording as a single unit, even to the extent of following similar daily routines. It also notably features collaborations with a number of guest musicians such as Jemeel Moondoc and Fred Lonberg-Holm. The lyrics, mostly written by Casey on the spot, have been described as dark and apocalyptic; while the music has been found to be subtler and more dynamic than the band's past releases.

Titled after "get rich quick" infomercials, the album was scheduled to be released in May, but was postponed to July due to the COVID-19 pandemic. Three singles were released accompanied by their respective videos, and a visual version of the album was made available 2 days before its release. It received "critical acclaim", with many critics finding it reflective of the state of the world at large in 2020 despite being written the year before, while the band also received praise for their stylistic evolution.

== Background ==
The band's debut album, 2012's No Passion All Technique, was reissued in May 2019. Lead singer Joe Casey later said that that album's re-release, and an "unspecified, pre-Covid sickness" that he was suffering from at the time, had him "thinking about the passage of time and its ultimate conclusion". He elaborated as follows:

Listening to No Passion All Technique again, I could hear myself hoping for an introduction and a long future, but also being cognizant that it could be 'one and done' for us. So, when it came time to write Ultimate Success Today, I was reminded of that first urgency and how it was an inverse of my current grapple with how terribly ill I've been feeling lately. Was that sick feeling colouring how I felt about the state of the world or was it the other way around?

The record was conceived, in his words, as "possible valediction of some confusingly loud five-act play", as well as a "mile marker" of the band's first decade together.

== Recording ==
The album was recorded over 2019 at Dreamland Recording Studios, which is located inside a 19th-century church in Hurley, New York. Produced with the help of David Tolomei (known for his work with Dirty Projectors and Beach House), the album was consciously recorded with a stronger emphasis on collaboration. Casey expanded on the differences between the recording process for this album and the band's past collaborations with Kelley Deal both live and on their Consolation EP:

With Kelley, it was a little more like, “wherever she wants to take it, that's where the song will go.” I think Greg [Ahee] wanted to continue that as a principle, and he knew he didn't want to use a lot of reverb, effects or keyboards/synths like he usually does. We wanted to bring in collaborators who could replace what Greg did with effects so there can be more space in the songs, but also to collaborate and change the songs as they see fit. The collaborators on this album are people we didn't know ahead of time, and this was our first time doing this kind of thing. We knew Kelley. With your friends, they'll be kinder to you, but you don't want to present strangers and masters of their craft with a shitty song. And finding people to come collaborate was kind of piecemeal.

The resulting sessions included contributions from Nandi Rose Plunkett, alto saxophonist Jemeel Moondoc, clarinetist Izaak Mills, and cellist Fred Lonberg-Holm. Plunkett's vocals are prominently featured on "June 21" alongside Casey's, who felt that her contributions would sound refreshing at that point in the album. He also revealed that Mills "is probably on the most songs and was at the studio the longest. He changed "Processed by the Boys" completely by adding that clarinet line, and it was like 'now we're cooking!'" Vocally, Casey himself sought to "tow that line" between sounding more conventional and "more free and ragged and full of personality, which [the band's] music inspires.” Mills recalled that Casey wrote much of the lyrics "on the spot" and that he'd spend hours in the booth to record vocal takes for multiple tracks one after another. According to bassist Scott Davidson, the band tried to get in sync for the recordings by "playing and recording as a complete unit", noting that the band had moved in together a few months before the sessions began and even maintained the same sleep schedule and diet.

== Composition ==
=== Musical style ===
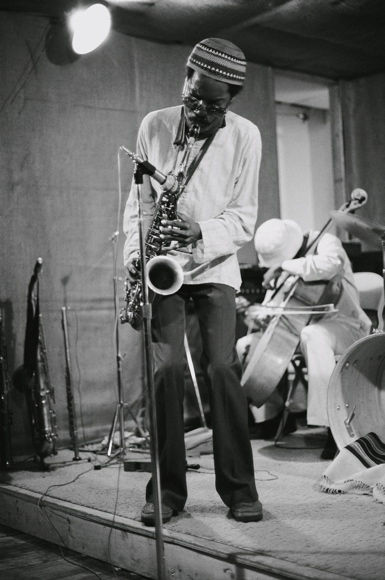
Jemeel Moondoc plays on Ultimate Success Today.

Guitarist Greg Ahee described the album as their "nature" record, and was inspired by jazz fusion musician Bennie Maupin's debut The Jewel in the Lotus. Drummer Alex Leonard, on the other hand, was inspired by the work of Wild Beasts drummer Chris Talbot:

I saw Chris Talbot play such diverse parts and they all served the songs perfectly. Having the percussion drive the song, but also act as its own melody is something I'm preoccupied with and that happens frequently on those Wild Beasts records.

MusicOMH noted that the band's debut's "brash post-punk" had evolved into a "distinctive blend of densely-layered noise rock, ominous art rock and squalid punk" on Ultimate Success Today. The album's featured collaborations were found by Mark Deming to result in a sound that "sets it apart from the group's previous work", despite being distinct from its contemporaries. American Songwriter found Casey's lyrics to be "underscored" by "the chaos that reigns beneath the surface — a mix of brass, strings and atmospheric effects", resulting in a sound that it describes as being "both intimidating and unyielding". Mixdown magazine even noted the occasional jazz influence as a result of Mills' and Moondoc's contributions. According to Alexis Petridis, "the album's deployment of free jazz players, [...] is subtly and smartly done, their contributions driving the tracks along, never descending to the kind of skronky din that rock bands indulge in when they want to let listeners know their tastes extend to Ornette Coleman or Albert Ayler."

The opening track "Day Without End" has been described as "an unholy mesh of The Doors' dire delivery and the turgid tones of the Stooges, Captain Beefheart and Public Image." Petridis notes that "Processed by the Boys" sounds closer to "stadium rock" than post-punk, while MusicOMH finds Ahee's guitarwork on the track to be no wave-inspired. "I Am You Now" features prominent drumming and Davidson's "rolling, serpentine" bass-playing. The guitars that come in two-thirds of the way through the track have been described as "ominous" and "menacing" in their intensity. "June 21" and "The Aphorist" have been described as being more subdued than the remaining tracks, despite still being "turgid". The former - featuring the aforementioned Nandi Plunkett - has been stylistically compared to The National despite its "slowly rising sense of dread" and features a "motorik" beat. The latter track features glam rock-inspired drumming and its instrumental bridge 2:30 minutes in was compared to Phantom of the Opera. The track's "impressively snappy dynamic and rhythmical shifts" are also present on "Tranquilizer", which has been described as being reminiscent of David Bowie's Blackstar in its "horrifying, Evil Dead atmospherics [...] alternat[ing] between eerie jazz and lightning-hot noise rock". "Michigan Hammers" consists of "blasting guitar riffs" and has been described as "by turns suffocating and euphoric". The latter adjective was used in describing "Modern Business Hymns", a "wonderful piece of punk rock adrenaline" featuring prominent brass-work. The penultimate "anthemic" track "Bridge & Crown" has been described as the album's "emotional centerpiece", on which Casey's vocals sound like "a lonely crooner at the end of time." The closing track "Worm in Heaven" has been described as a "ballad", "an oddly uplifting track that evokes Nick Cave‘s The Good Son/Henry's Dream era." Its positive nature has also been noted by Deming in its "languid" sound. The track features "smooth" bass-lines and ends with "waves of distortion".

=== Themes ===
There is darkness in the poetry of Ultimate Success Today, [...] The theme of things ending, above all human existence, is present and reminiscent of Cormac McCarthy's The Road. Our world has reached a point that makes us afraid: fires, floods, earthquakes, hunger, war, intolerance…There are cries of despair. Is there hope? Greed is the sickness that puts life in danger.

— Ana da Silva

Ultimate Success Today's themes were mainly inspired by Casey's feelings on his own mortality, spurred by his aforementioned illness which "was a combination of coming off tour and having [his] body fall apart" in the midst of a mid-life crisis. "I wanted the album to sound like a final statement," he said in an interview with NME, "merely to clear the decks, so whatever comes next – if anything comes next – can have a fresh approach, and not be bogged down by these obsessions I’ve had in lyrics for the last ten years." He has also spoken of his own father's death prior to starting the band as an influence on the album's lyrics:

People say it gets less hurtful or frightening or sad, but that’s not really true – it just changes colour and form. I also feel like, if I live long enough, I'm going to have other loved ones die, and it’s something that I have to move beyond, at least in writing about it, because it’s been going on ten years now. I feel like I’ve talked about it from different angles across these first five albums, these chapters. Those can be about that, and then I can move on.

Despite being written a year prior, several sources have identified parallels between the album's lyrics and the state of the world at large at the time of its release, with many describing them as being apocalyptic in nature. Summarizing the album as a whole as "predictive texts for a world in chaos", Alexis Petridis writes:

[T]here are visions of cities erupting in violence, of "shut-ins" panicking, of populations reliant on "built-up respirators" for survival. “What a way to die," he offers on Modern Business Hymns, "pulled apart by the absence of what sustains us." After a while, his predictive powers start to seem so uncanny you feel like getting in touch with Casey to see if he's got any thoughts on next Saturday's lottery numbers or the 3.30pm at Haydock Park.

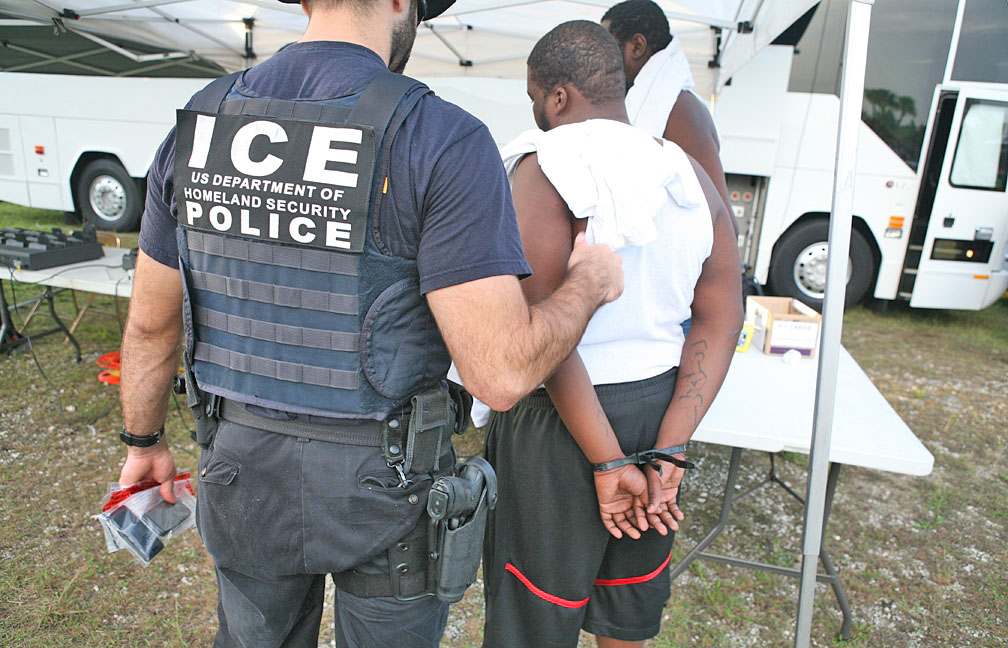
"Processed by the Boys" is based on ICE and its evolution under Trump.

"Day Without End" opens the album by referencing back to the closing track from Relatives in Descent, "Half Sister". This was done in order to counteract the "note of hope" in that song's ending. "The idea of a day that never ends is quite disturbing to me," Casey said in an interview with The Fader, "[The song is] trying to place all the events in the present, whereas in the past and on previous records, it has been a lot of looking back nostalgically, but sometimes bitterly." The lyrics also consist of the album's title. "Processed by the Boys" was written about Donald Trump's use of the U.S. Immigration and Customs Enforcement agency and its subsequent evolution from "this kind of bizarre pseudo-army to [...] a full-fledged army." The lyrics suggest that "when the end comes, it will not be that "foreign disease" or "a dagger plunged from out the shadows." Instead: "Reality has a far duller edge /Everybody's hunted with a smile, being processed by the boys."" Casey described his performance and writing on "I Am You Now" as being angrier, the lyrics - written from the perspective of another character - being "haunted by doppelgangers and sundered identities". According to Casey, the song is about "how corporations will—or anybody—will take people that are marginalized or suffering, and then draw them into this world and make them feel like they're important by selling things to them. And how the person that is suffering will immediately be turned into a symbol for the status quo: ‘Oh, as long as somebody's selling something to me, I must be included." The phrase "Join the conversation" has been interpreted as being a reference to Pepsi's controversial Live for Now commercial starring Kendall Jenner.

"The Aphorist" is about the creative process and "meaning" in art as opposed to its "obscurity", the lyrics a result of Casey struggling to respond to the state of the U.S. "without falling into slogans". The track also contains a diss at Pitchfork critic Ian Cohen. "June 21" is about "a sadness that can hit you during the summer", whose lyrics "truly makes summer in the city sound dirty and gritty". The lyrics to "Michigan Hammers", inspired by kitchen sink realism, are based on Casey's memories of Michigan "being not a worker's utopia, but a place where the working man was at least given lip service, and had unions to bolster him. That's been degraded over time." "Tranquilizer"'s lyrics are explicitly about Casey's fears of mortality and illness. "Modern Business Hymns" is the second track on the album to feature its title in its lyrics and is a continuation of "Tranquilizer", ending in a "miserable" and "nihilistic[ally] [hopeless]" vision of humanity's future: "We can think about spaceships, but the spaceships are going to be owned by billionaires. Capitalism will exist in space. It's not going to be the Star Trek world, where only the Ferengis care about money and nobody else does." Casey described "Bridge and Crown" as "the culmination of five albums worth of music and story. It talks about reaching the end of the line, the little dreams that keep us going, the contract we have with ourselves and the contract we have with others." The lyrics, which consist of the third and final mention of the album's title, directly reference his father's death. The closing track "Worm in Heaven" was described by Casey as his "goodbye song": "If I deserve to have a clip on some newsprint saying, 'Oh by the way, the guy from Protomartyr died’, then they can play [this song], and for however many years I have left, I can write other songs now. I don't have to have that hanging over my head.” Petridis notes that its lyrics alternate between "faint optimism" and "something darker and dejected", while Slant Magazine finds it to contain the album's "only semblance of hope, as [...] a basic acknowledgement of existence—of having been alive and leaving a trace of that presence."

== Packaging ==
=== Title ===
The phrase "Ultimate Success Today" was inspired by late night infomercials that Casey would watch while trying to write lyrics for the album. Though it was not inspired by any particular commercial, Casey said the phrase "was definitely inspired by the ‘get rich quick’ commercial. 'You've gotta listen to this guy talk about how to sell houses, and then you can get rich today!'"

=== Cover ===
The cover art for the album depicts a mule. Calling himself a "horse girl", Casey spoke of his fascination with the animal - and its thematic relationship to the album - in an interview with The Line of Best Fit:

When I was growing up, I worked at a summer camp with a corral of horses, [...] That was a dream come true for a kid growing up in the city to go to a summer camp in the country and ride horses and stuff. People are like, ‘Oh, you love horses? When's the last time you rode?’ The last time I rode was the day that camp closed and I've never ridden a horse since. I've always liked horses. But the mules, I just love the way the mules work and look and the fact that they're sterile and they can't have kids. That's interesting to me, that they're the symbol of the army and they've been used.

The background of the cover also consists of a "secret code" that he tried to "painstakingly [...] scratch out.":

I think it took so long for me to do it and I was worried about making mistakes that I just doubled it on the cover, where it's just split, [...] I was able to do half of it and then I was like, ‘Okay, that's good enough. The mule's in the way, no one's gonna give a shit, Joe.”

=== Physical formats ===
The album was released by Domino Recording Company as a mini-gatefold CD and as an LP. The latter comes with an instant download of the full release in MP3 and WAV format. The album was also made available as a now out-of-stock limited edition LP, consisting of a "[b]lue in red colored vinyl", a 20-page magazine consisting of the album's lyrics, and a poster.

== Release ==
Ultimate Success Today was released through Domino Recording Company. The album was originally scheduled to be released on May 29, 2020, before being delayed to July 17, 2020.

=== Singles ===
"Processed by the Boys" was released on March 11, accompanied by an announcement of the album title and tracklist. Its music video, directed by David Allen and Nathan Faustyn, was inspired by a YouTube clip titled "Puppet trolling viewer during the concert live on Brazilian TV" that the band were obsessed with.

A month before its scheduled release, on April 28, "Worm in Heaven" was released as the album's second single. This was accompanied by the announcement of a new album release date of July 17. Its music video, directed by Trevor Naud, was a result of "experimenting with shooting multiples of still photographs and stitching them together so that there's subtle movement. Almost like a 3-D camera effect, but awkward and sort of unsettling — like looking at a photograph under shallow water."

A month later, on May 28, the album's third single "Michigan Hammers" was released. Its music video, directed by Yoonha Park and created entirely out of stock footage, was described as "a retelling of a well-known Michigan folk tale that describes timeless themes of greed, power, death and rebirth and nothing short of the conflict of good and evil." Casey added that the idea behind the video's creation was reflected in the song itself, which "is about I think—building with rubble".

=== Tour ===
After the release of "Processed by the Boys", Protomartyr had announced and was scheduled to embark on a 4-month tour, covering dates across the US and Europe. Of these, as of March 11, 5 shows—one in Chicago, two in London, one in Paris and one in Utrecht—had been sold out. However, by the time "Worm in Heaven" was released, the band was forced to cancel the entirety of the tour due to the COVID-19 pandemic.

In November 2021, a year after the release of the album, the band began touring in the United States, with the first show on November 8 in Chicago. The American leg of the tour concluded on November 21, 2021 in Pittsburgh. In March 2022, the band will tour in Europe.

=== Visual album ===
The band premiered a visual version of the album on July 15, two days before the actual album's release. It consists of videos for each track on the album (including the ones for the aforementioned singles) edited together into a short film, directed by Dominic Ciccodicola, David Allen, Nathan Faustyn, Joseph Howard, Trevor Naud, Ashley Armitage, Yoonha Park, and Jeremy Franchi. All of these videos - apart from "Processed by the Boys" - were made in lockdown, and one of them even features illustrations by drummer Alex Leonard. To view the album, which premiered twice at 8 PM ET and 9 PM ET, fans were required to sign up for it in advance, and were also encouraged to donate to their choice of three different charities.

Starting from July 21, the band released to YouTube the aforementioned videos for "June 21", "Day Without End", "I Am You Now", "The Aphorist", "Tranquilizer" and "Modern Business Hymns" together, and finally "Bridge & Crown" in the given order.

== Critical reception ==
Professional ratings
Aggregate scores
Source	Rating
AnyDecentMusic?	8.0/10
Metacritic	82/100
Review scores
Source	Rating
AllMusic	4/5 stars
American Songwriter	3/5 stars
DIY	4/5 stars
The Guardian	4/5 stars
The Line of Best Fit	9/10
MusicOMH	5/5 stars
Paste	8.0/10
Pitchfork	8.0/10
Q	4/5 stars
Slant Magazine	4/5 stars

The critical response to Ultimate Success Today has been mostly positive. It has received a Metacritic score of 82 based on 18 reviews indicating "universal acclaim", despite being their lowest-rated studio album to date on the website. On AnyDecentMusic?, the album has a score of 8.0/10. Writing for The Guardian, Alexis Petridis noted that the band "seem to be almost eerily skilled at producing" music "for uncertain times", and found the band's musical approach to be less indebted to older post-punk acts like The Fall than their previous releases. In a perfect score review, MusicOMH similarly noted the band's musical evolution, calling it a "much more advanced and progressive record" than the band's debut, as well as their "most cathartic statement to date." In a similarly perfect score review, NARC Magazine called the album "a rich and still strikingly relevant work", praising Casey's lyrics on it as being his "career best". "Ultimate Success Today has the power of an exorcism," notes The Line of Best Fit, "and even if it is not a cure for the sickness, it is somewhere to hide in these dark times." In a review for AllMusic, Mark Deming suggests that the album "sounds timely in 2020, but this music would be a smart, compelling accompaniment for staring into the abyss as it begins to look back, no matter what the year." Paste finds Casey's performances on the album to be less vulnerable than on past releases, but concedes that his "limited range of sneering derision [...] is simply what the present deserves." Loud and Quiet hailed it as "thought-provoking, distinctive and testament to the boldness of post-punk in the present day." Under the Radar praised the subtler instrumentation offered on the record in comparison to past releases, finding that the songs "are allowed to breathe and build more, taking surprising twists and turns is a highly satisfying way." The review also called Scott Davidson "the real star of the show here, writing expressive walking basslines on tracks such as the Half Waif featuring 'June 21' or the terrific 'Michigan Hammers.'"

Giving it a 7/10, Gigwise called the album "an emotional rollercoaster of a record, but one that is well and truly worth riding." Uncut found many of the more "cacophonous" tracks such as "Michigan Hammers", "Modern Business Hymns" and "I Am You Now" to be similar to their previous efforts, calling the album "[d]isjointed sounds and anger in extremis". In a mixed review, American Songwriter wrote that the album "isn’t [...] for the faint of heart", calling the songs dark and "unsettling".

=== Accolades ===
Year-end accolades for Ultimate Success Today
Publication	Country	Accolade	Rank
Beats Per Minute	US	Top 50 Albums of 2020	19
BrooklynVegan	US	Indie Basement: Top 40 Albums of 2020	23
Columbus Alive	US	Andy's top 10 albums of 2020	1
Paste	US	Best Albums of 2020	32
Slant Magazine	US	The 50 Best Albums of 2020	43
Under the Radar	US	Under the Radars Top 100 Albums of 2020	51
Bandcamp Daily	US	Best of 2020: It Got Heavy	-
AllMusic	US	Favorite Rock Albums	-
Loud and Quiet	UK	The Loud And Quiet best albums of 2020	8
OndaRock	Italy	The best of 2020	2
Nothing but Hope and Passion	Germany	The 50 Best Albums Of 2020	17

== Track listing ==
=== CD ===
All tracks are written by Protomartyr.

Ultimate Success Today US CD release (WIGCD464)
No.	Title	Length
1.	"Day Without End"	3:16
2.	"Processed by the Boys"	5:05
3.	"I Am You Now"	3:12
4.	"The Aphorist"	3:43
5.	"June 21"	4:36
6.	"Michigan Hammers"	4:00
7.	"Tranquilizer"	3:09
8.	"Modern Business Hymns"	4:14
9.	"Bridge & Crown"	4:22
10.	"Worm in Heaven"	4:30
Total length:		40:07

=== LP ===
Side A
No.	Title	Length
1.	"Day Without End"	3:16
2.	"Processed by the Boys"	5:05
3.	"I Am You Now"	3:12
4.	"The Aphorist"	3:43
5.	"June 21"	4:36
Total length:		19:52

Side B
No.	Title	Length
1.	"Michigan Hammers"	4:00
2.	"Tranquilizer"	3:09
3.	"Modern Business Hymns"	4:14
4.	"Bridge & Crown"	4:22
5.	"Worm in Heaven"	4:30
Total length:		20:15

== Personnel ==
Adapted from album liner notes:

Protomartyr

- Joe Casey – vocals
- Greg Ahee – guitars
- Alex Leonard – drums
- Scott Davidson – bass guitar

Guest musicians

- Nandi Rose – vocals
- Jemeel Moondoc – alto sax
- Izaak Mills – bass clarinet, sax, flute
- Fred Lonberg-Holm – cello
- Cory Plump – vocals
- David Bevins – mouth claps

Additional credits

- Ken Helmlinger – assistant engineer
- Rainer Reeves-Cohen – assistant engineer
- David Tolomei – mixing
- Sarah Register – mastering
- Joe Casey – layout
- Jeff Arcel – layout

== Charts ==
Chart performance for Ultimate Success Today
Chart (2020)	Peak position
Belgian Albums (Ultratop Flanders)	123
Scottish Albums (Official Charts)	40
UK Independent Albums (Official Charts)	12
US Top Album Sales (Billboard)	85
US Indie Store Album Sales (Billboard)	19

== Notes ==
1Side A ends with a locked groove of the insect sounds that end "June 21"
2Credited as "JKBC"
