= A Beautiful Thing: Idles Live at le Bataclan =

Live album by Idles
- Released: 6 December 2019
- Recorded: 3 December 2018
- Venue: Le Bataclan, Paris, France
- Genre: Rock; punk rock; indie rock
- Label: Partisan
- Producer: Romain Grenier

Idles chronology
Joy as an Act of Resistance (2018)	A Beautiful Thing: Idles Live at le Bataclan (2019)	Ultra Mono (2020)

A Beautiful Thing: Idles Live at le Bataclan is a live album by Idles recorded at Le Bataclan on 3 December 2018, the final performance on the band's first Joy as an Act of Resistance tour, and released on 6 December 2019 by Partisan Records.

The album was released as a CD, download, and on double LP in three limited edition coloured vinyl editions.

== Artists' perception of the show ==
Idles frontman Joe Talbot said of the concert, "Our show at Bataclan was the end of a very long journey for us. On that tour we learned so much about ourselves, each other, and the audiences we have grown with over the past 10 years. That show was nothing short of catharsis and nothing more than love."

Guitarist Mark Bowen said of the show:

"There was an impending sense of freedom in the room. That night was catharsis in a bottle, a rage and camaraderie that can only be obtained by spending 3 and a 1/2 months on a bus/van with 8 other people you have already spent way too much time with. That can only be obtained by the presence of a receptive, understanding and respectful audience. That night felt as if everyone in that room was in it together. We had created something needed on that tour, by the 5 of us, our crew, anyone in that room that night or any other on the tour. We need, as much as any others, to repeat the simple mantras from our songs to help us work through the dark and get better. Love Yourself, love yourself, LOVE YOURSELF."

== Reception ==
Professional ratings
Review scores
Source	Rating
AllMusic	3.5/5 stars
The Irish News	3/5 stars
Kerrang!	4/5 stars
Mojo	8/10 stars
Uncut	8/10 stars

Kerrang! reviewer Paul Travers gave it 4/5, saying "It's not just that it’s a warts-and-all snapshot; the warts are actually some of the juiciest bits here." Mojo called it "a deep, thrilling listen", while Uncut wrote "The live setting and frontman Joe Talbot's inter-song exhortations heighten the feeling of being sucked into communal catharsis." Jessie Atkinson, writing for Gigwise.com, called it "a gorgeous memoir of the Golden Age of IDLES". AllMusic writer Liam Martin gave it three and a half stars, saying that the album "serves admirably as a brief glimpse of the band riding a career high, at a point where they've transitioned from industry favorites to fan favorites". Mike Bedigan, for The Irish News, awarded it three stars, stating that it "truly brings out the band's angry, political and head-banging brilliance".

== Track listing ==
1. "Colossus"
2. "Never Fight a Man with a Perm"
3. "Mother"
4. "Faith in the City"
5. "I'm Scum"
6. "Danny Nedelko"
7. "Divide & Conquer"
8. "1049 Gotho"
9. "Samaritans"
10. "Television"
11. "Great"
12. "Love Song"
13. "White Privilege"
14. "Gram Rock"
15. "Benzocaine"
16. "Exeter"
17. "Cry to Me"
18. "Well Done"
19. "Rottweiler"

== Charts ==
Chart (2019)	Peak position
Scottish Albums (OCC)	36
UK Albums (OCC)	59
