= All Are Saved =

Studio album by Fred Thomas
- Released: April 7, 2015
- Recorded: March 2013 – July 2014
- Studios: Life Like Studios; High Bias (Detroit, Michigan)
- Genre: Indie rock
- Length: 39.07
- Label: Polyvinyl Record Co.

Fred Thomas chronology
| Kuma (2012) | All Are Saved (2015) | Changer (2017) |

Singles from All Are Saved
- 1. "Bad Blood" Released: January 28, 2015; 2. "Cops Don't Care Pt. II" Released: February 25, 2015; 3. "Every Song Sung to a Dog" Released: March 27, 2015

All Are Saved is an LP by the American indie rock artist Fred Thomas. It was released on April 7, 2015, on Polyvinyl Records in the USA. Formats were vinyl LP, CD, cassette, digital download and streaming services. While it was Thomas's eighth solo LP, it was the first to have been released on a larger scale record label and, as such, gained much more press attention than his previous CD-R and minor label releases had done to that point.

== Musical style ==
Whilst All Are Saved retained some of the troubadour style of Thomas's earlier solo records, it also incorporated styles more characteristic of a number of his previous musical projects, including indiepop band Saturday Looks Good to Me and the post-rock duo City Center. Thomas's vocals on the LP were a talking point in reviews and interviews, as he incorporated a kind of speak-singing style influenced by BARR, the indie rock project of Brendan Fowler. Thematically, the lyrics dealt with death, anger and Thomas's place in the music world.

== Singles ==
The first pre-release single to be issued was "Bad Blood". Thomas shared a stream of the track on January 28, 2015, on his Tumblr page and it was picked up by various music sites over the next few weeks. In a positive review for Pitchfork, Jenn Pelly said that the "venomous" track was a break away from the style of his previous records and projects, and referred to it as "vulnerable, thick-skinned, human—clarity piercing through the clouds of one's subconscious like an all-too realistic bad dream". A second single, "Cops Don't Care Pt. 2" was released in late February and a third, "Every Song Sung to a Dog", followed at the end of March.

After the album was issued, Thomas also released a promotional video for "Cops Don't Care Pt. II", which featured him playing guitar in slow motion whilst being showered with something that looks like gravel, and occasionally slapped by small children. This was premiered by Stereogum on May 12, who said of it, "In less than two minutes, 'Cops Don’t Care Pt. II' breaks your heart and puts it back together again". Polyvinyl also issued the song as one side of a split 7-inch single along with "Find Yourself" by Jacco Gardener. This was part of the label's "With Compliments" series and not put on general sale, but rather sent out with random orders from the Polyvinyl shop as a free gift.

== Critical reception ==
All Are Saved was favorably reviewed in the music press. Ian Cohen gave it a score of 8.0 on Pitchfork and said that it was "devastating and funny in ways that previous releases barely even considered, a biographical work of art capable of leveling people who have never heard of him". This positive response was typical of reviews of the album, with AllMusic, Paste and Under the Radar all following suit. It was given four stars out of five by AllMusic and was included in their "Best of 2015" end of year selection.

== Track listing ==
All tracks are written by Fred Thomas.

| No. | Title | Length |
|---|---|---|
| 1. | "Every Song Sung to a Dog" | 3.53 |
| 2. | "When They Built the Schools" | 3.33 |
| 3. | "July" | 1.37 |
| 4. | "Cops Don't Care Pt. II" | 1.47 |
| 5. | "Monster Movie" | 3.27 |
| 6. | "Bad Blood" | 4.10 |
| 7. | "Unfading Flower" | 3.26 |
| 8. | "Bed Bugs" | 5:04 |
| 9. | "Expo '87" | 2.31 |
| 10. | "Thesis (Lear)" | 2,42 |
| 11. | "Doggie" | 6.57 |
| Total length: | | 39.07 |
