= Formal Growth in the Desert =

Studio album by Protomartyr
- Released: June 2, 2023
- Recorded: August 1–14, 2022
- Studio: Sonic Ranch (Tornillo, Texas)
- Genre: Post-punk
- Length: 37:41
- Label: Domino
- Producers: Greg Ahee, Jake Aron

Protomartyr chronology
Ultimate Success Today (2020)	Formal Growth in the Desert (2023)	Hotel Usona (2026)

Singles from Formal Growth in the Desert
- 1. "Make Way" Released: March 7, 2023; 2. "Elimination Dances" Released: April 26, 2023; 3. "Polacrilex Kid" Released: May 30, 2023

Formal Growth in the Desert is the sixth studio album by American post-punk band Protomartyr, released on June 2, 2023 on Domino Records. Produced by guitarist Greg Ahee and Jake Aron, the album was recorded over two weeks in August 2022 at Sonic Ranch in Tornillo, Texas.

Preceded by the singles, "Make Way", "Elimination Dances" and "Polacrilex Kid", the album was released to critical acclaim, with its lyrical content influenced by the recent COVID-19 pandemic, which had affected the release of the band's previous studio album, Ultimate Success Today (2020); the death of frontman Joe Casey's mother, and his recent engagement.

== Background and recording ==
Protomartyr released their fifth studio album, Ultimate Success Today, in July 2020 in the midst of global COVID-19 lockdowns. Unable to tour in support of the album, the band entered an unplanned hiatus, with the uncertainty of the pandemic leading frontman Joe Casey to question whether the band could continue due to the financial pressures. With the eventual easing of travel restrictions, the band reconvened in late 2021 and 2022 to tour with Kelley Deal on additional guitar.

The band soon began work on Formal Growth in the Desert, with Casey noting that his prior public speculation on whether the band could continue ultimately lead to the band members embracing a new lease of life during the writing and recording period: "We could just work on music. That gave us an out where we could start afresh, and it released the pressure of coming off a year of not doing shit and then being forced to recapture the magic." During the writing process, the band was directly influenced by the impact of the COVID-19 pandemic, with Casey wanting to present a mostly positive outlook in its aftermath. One of the central themes of the album asked, "What are realistic ways to continue living after something like that?"

== Writing and composition ==
The album's opening track and first single, "Make Way", is in the same musical key as "Worm in Heaven", the closing track to the band's previous studio album, Ultimate Success Today (2020), which frontman Joe Casey described as a "funeral song". Reflecting on "Make Way" following that track chronologically in the band's catalogue, Casey stated: "I just figured that after the years of COVID where millions of people died and everybody was face to face with mortality, the living still have to exist, in a non-religious sort of rapture way. Everybody’s gone, and now the people that remain have to continue on." The album's second track, "For Tomorrow", is described as a "lazy, depressed person’s anthem."

== Critical reception ==
Professional ratings
Aggregate scores
Source	Rating
AnyDecentMusic?	8.0/10
Metacritic	80/100
Review scores
Source	Rating
AllMusic	4/5 stars
DIY	4/5 stars
Exclaim!	7/10
The Line of Best Fit	9/10
NME	4/5 stars
Pitchfork	7.6/10
PopMatters	8/10
The Skinny	5/5 stars
Slant Magazine	4/5 stars
Sputnikmusic	4.1/5

At Metacritic, which assigns a weighted average rating out of 100 to reviews from mainstream critics, Formal Growth in the Desert received a rating of 80 out of 100 based on thirteen critic reviews, indicating "generally favorable reviews".

== Track listing ==
All tracks are written by Protomartyr.

Formal Growth in the Desert track listing
No.	Title	Length
1.	"Make Way"	2:58
2.	"For Tomorrow"	2:27
3.	"Elimination Dances"	3:37
4.	"Fun in Hi Skool"	2:43
5.	"Let's Tip the Creator"	3:43
6.	"Graft vs. Host"	2:52
7.	"3800 Tigers"	2:24
8.	"Polacrilex Kid"	3:48
9.	"Fulfillment Center"	1:53
10.	"We Know the Rats"	2:56
11.	"The Author"	3:21
12.	"Rain Garden"	4:59
Total length:		37:41

== Personnel ==
Adapted from album liner notes:

Protomartyr

- Joe Casey – vocals
- Greg Ahee – guitars, synth
- Alex Leonard – drums
- Scott Davidson – bass guitar

Guest musicians

- Bill Radcliffe – pedal steel

Additional credits

- Jake Aron – recording engineer, mixing
- Sarah Register – master
- Mario Ramirez – assistant engineer
- Nat Chernitsky Rittner – assistant engineer
- Diego Mendoza – assistant engineer
- Trevor Naud – photos
- Nicholas Kitakis – cover model
- Breonna Phillips – cover model
- Joe Casey (credited as "JKB Casey") – layout
- Jeff Arcel – layout

== Charts ==
Chart performance for Formal Growth in the Desert
Chart (2023)	Peak position
Scottish Albums (Official Charts)	29
UK Album Downloads (Official Charts)	49
UK Independent Albums (Official Charts)	10
