= Hotel Usona =

Studio album by Protomartyr
- Released: September 25, 2026
- Genres: Post-punk; art rock
- Length: 45:23
- Label: Domino
- Producer: Dave Fridmann

Protomartyr chronology
Formal Growth in the Desert (2023)	Hotel Usona (2026)

Singles from Hotel Usona
- 1. "Sounds We Cannot Hear" Released: July 22, 2026; 2. "Feed the Sewer" Released: August 27, 2026; 3. "Exalted Eagles" Released: September 21, 2026

Hotel Usona is the seventh studio album by American post-punk band Protomartyr, released on September 25, 2026 on Domino. Produced by Dave Fridmann, the album was preceded by the singles "Sounds We Cannot Hear", "Feed the Sewer" and "Exalted Eagles".

Hotel Usona is a concept album set within a fictional hotel, with the band "reckoning with the horrors of our current moment." Frontman and lyricist Joe Casey imagined "his country as an aging hotel... each song a room haunted by its own troublesome guest."

== Critical reception ==
On Album of the Year, the album has an average score of 85 out of 100 from thirteen critic scores. Any Decent Music gave it a weighted average score of 8.3 out of 10 from twelve critic scores. According to Metacritic, it received "universal acclaim" based on a weighted average score of 86 out of 100 from eleven critic scores.

== Track listing ==
All lyrics are written by Joe Casey; all music is composed by Alex Leonard, Greg Ahee, Joe Casey, and Scott Davidson; all tracks are produced by Dave Fridmann and co-produced by Greg Ahee.

No.	Title	Length
1.	"The Old Hotel"	4:21
2.	"Sounds We Cannot Hear"	5:26
3.	"Converts"	4:06
4.	"Exalted Eagles"	4:21
5.	"The Knife Dream"	5:59
6.	"Feed the Sewer"	4:36
7.	"Lavender – Gospel"	4:10
8.	"Third Country"	4:38
9.	"Checking Out"	7:42
Total length:		45:23

== Personnel ==
These credits have been adapted from various music streaming services.

=== Protomartyr ===
- Alex Leonard – drums
- Greg Ahee – guitar, piano, Rhodes piano, pump organ, synthesizer, chimes, xylophone
- Joe Casey – vocals
- Scott Davidson – bass guitar

=== Others ===
- Dave Fridmann – recording, mixing
- Emily Lazar – mastering
- Jon Fridmann – trumpet (tracks 1–4); trombone (tracks 1–4, 6, and 8–9); euphonium, flugelhorn (tracks 1, 5–6, and 8–9); French horn (tracks 2, 4, 6, and 8–9); recording

== Charts ==
Chart performance for Hotel Usona
Chart (2026)	Peak position
Australian Albums (ARIA)	92
Belgian Albums (Ultratop Flanders)	200
Belgian Albums (Ultratop Wallonia)	91
Dutch Vinyl Albums (Dutch Charts)	27
French Physical Albums (SNEP)	68
French Rock & Metal Albums (SNEP)	33
Scottish Albums (Official Charts)	60
UK Albums Sales (Official Charts)	48
UK Independent Albums (Official Charts)	22
