= Heavy Lungs =

English rock band

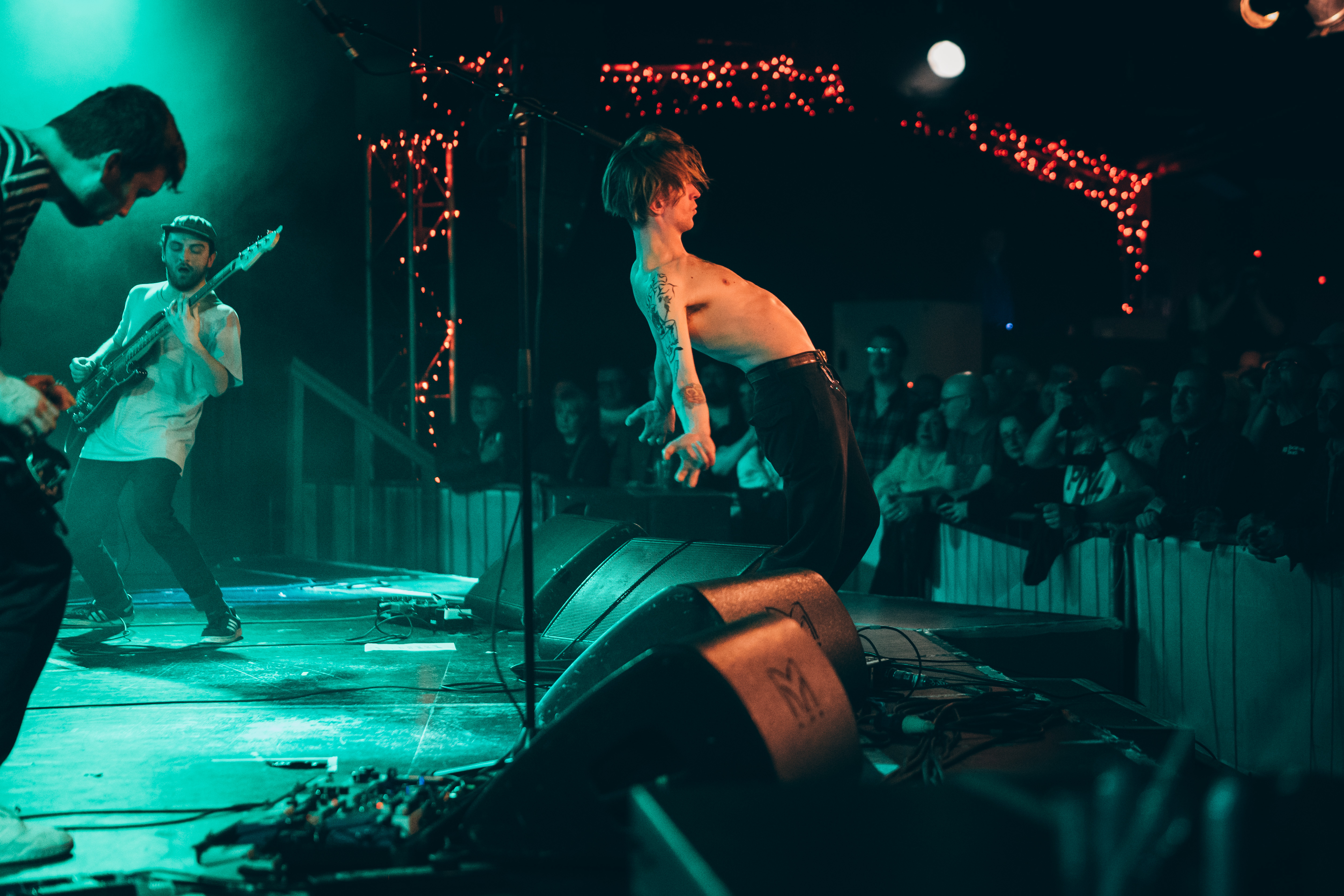

Background information
- Origin: Bristol, England
- Genres: Noise rock; post-punk
- Years active: 2017 – present
- Labels: FatCat; Balley
- Members: Danny Nedelko; Oliver Southgate; George Garratt; James Minchall
- Website: heavylungsband.com

Heavy Lungs are a British post-punk band originating from Bristol, UK. The band consists of songwriter and lead vocalist Danny Nedelko, guitarist Oliver Southgate, drummer George Garratt, and bassist James Minchall.

== History ==
Heavy Lungs formed in Bristol in early 2017 through bassist James Minchall and vocalist Danny Nedelko. Nedelko and Minchall had worked together, and began recording music together, later recruiting local Bristol musicians, Oliver Southgate and George Garratt to round out the band. In 2018, the band released their debut extended play, Abstract Thoughts.

In late 2018, the lead singer became the subject of a song bearing his name, created by fellow Bristol-based band IDLES. They released the track "Danny Nedelko" as the lead single from their second album, Joy as an Act of Resistance.

In 2019, the band released two EPs: Straight to CD which came out on 14 February 2019. The second EP, Measure was released on 10 October 2019.

On 29 September 2023, Heavy Lungs released their debut studio album, All Gas No Brakes.

== Discography ==
=== Studio albums ===
- All Gas No Brakes (2023)
- Caviar (2025)

=== Extended plays ===
- Abstract Thoughts (2018)
- Straight to CD (2019)
- Measure (2019)
