= Under Color of Official Right =

Studio album by Protomartyr
- Released: April 8, 2014
- Recorded: June 28–30, 2013
- Venue: Key Club Recording Company (Benton Harbor, Michigan)
- Genres: Post-punk; noise rock
- Length: 34:42
- Label: Hardly Art

Protomartyr chronology
No Passion All Technique (2012)	Under Color of Official Right (2014)	The Agent Intellect (2015)

Singles from Under Color of Official Right
- 1. "Scum, Rise!" Released: January 10, 2014; 2. "Come & See" Released: February 24, 2014

Under Color of Official Right is the second studio album by Detroit post punk band Protomartyr. It was released on April 8, 2014 by Hardly Art.

== Critical reception ==
Professional ratings
Aggregate scores
Source	Rating
AnyDecentMusic?	7.4/10
Metacritic	83/100
Review scores
Source	Rating
AllMusic	4.5/5 stars
Consequence of Sound	B−
Drowned in Sound	8/10
NME	8/10
The Observer	3/5 stars
Paste	8.6/10
Pitchfork	8.1/10
Q	4/5 stars
Rolling Stone	3.5/5 stars
Spin	8/10

Under Color of Official Right was met with considerable praise from music critics. At Metacritic, which assigns a normalized rating out of 100 to reviews from mainstream critics, the album has received an average score of 83, based on 18 reviews, indicating "universal acclaim". Ranking it the 5th best album of the decade in 2020, Brooklyn Vegan wrote:

Post punk sounds and industrial towns go hand in hand. Detroit’s Protomartyr have a sense of urgency and anger that could’ve sprouted from somewhere like Manchester or Cleveland in 1979 but frontman Joe Casey’s lyrics could’ve only sprung from one time and place. With a half-sung, half-shouted delivery, Casey is a true original, spewing literate bile that is usually funny, bleak and thoughtful all at the same time, while his three talented bandmates match his words with dark, powerful, exceptionally well-crafted music. [...] Under Color of Official Right, has them firing on all cylinders with Casey pointing his lens at, among other things, coastal invaders of his Detroit, absentee dads, local politics and inter-band dynamics. Best new band of this decade.

== Accolades ==
In addition to the ones listed below, the song "Maidenhead" was ranked by Spin and Les Inrockuptibles as the 68th and 42nd best song of the year respectively. Pitchfork ranked "Scum, Rise!" 90th on their list of "The 100 Best Tracks of 2014". Rob Sheffield ranked "What the Wall Said" 7th on his list of the "Top 25 Songs of 2014 So Far".

=== Year-end ===
Publication	Country	Accolade	Rank
The A.V. Club	U.S.	The 20 best albums of 2014	#7
No Ripcord	U.K.	Top Albums of 2014	#3
Loud and Quiet	U.K.	Albums of The Year 2014	#9
Rolling Stone	U.S.	Rob Sheffield's Top 20 Albums of 2014	#10
Chicago Tribune	U.S.	Top albums of 2014	#2
The New York Times	U.S.	Ben Ratliff’s Top 10 Albums and Songs of 2014	#9
NME	U.K.	Top 50 Albums of 2014	#39
Spin	U.S.	The 50 Best Albums of 2014	#24
Pazz & Jop	U.S.	The Top 50 Albums of 2014	#36

=== Decade-end ===
Publication	Country	Accolade	Rank
Treble	U.S.	Top 150 Albums of the 2010s	#69
Slug Mag	U.S.	10 Post-Punk Albums From The 2010s That You'll Love Into 2020	-
BrooklynVegan	U.S.	141 Best Albums of the 2010s	#77
BrooklynVegan	U.S.	Bill’s Indie Basement: Favorite Albums of the 2010s	#5

== Influence & covers ==
Author David Means cited the tracks "Maidenhead" and "Ain't So Simple", among others, as an influence on his novel Hystopia, writing that "they reclaim a certain Detroit aesthetic—casting an ear back to noisy machine tooling shops and factory floors, while also forward to some high tech future." Andy MacFarlane of The Twilight Sad called it one of his favorite albums of the year. The Dirty Nil covered the track "I'll Take That Applause" as the b-side to the sixth volume of their The Dirty Nil Record Club series of singles, released in 2017.

== Track listing ==
No.	Title	Length
1.	"Maidenhead"	3:38
2.	"Ain't So Simple"	2:17
3.	"Want Remover"	2:29
4.	"Trust Me Billy"	2:14
5.	"Pagans"	1:11
6.	"What the Wall Said"	3:11
7.	"Tarpeian Rock"	2:02
8.	"Bad Advice"	2:40
9.	"Son of Dis"	1:08
10.	"Scum, Rise!"	2:37
11.	"I Stare at Floors"	2:33
12.	"Come & See"	3:56
13.	"Violent"	1:51
14.	"I'll Take That Applause"	2:55

== Personnel ==
Adapted from liner notes:

- Bass Guitar – Scott Davidson
- Drums – Alex Leonard
- Guitar, Synthesizer ["Prophet 5"] – Greg Ahee
- Vocals ["Vox"] – Joe Casey
- Writing ["All Songs By"] – Protomartyr

Additional credits

- Mastering – Sarah Register
- Recording, Mixing – Bill Skibbe

== Charts ==
Under Color of Official Right album chart
Chart	Peak position
US Top Rock Albums (Billboard)	19
US Heatseekers Albums (Billboard)	19
