= Protomartyr (band) =

American rock band

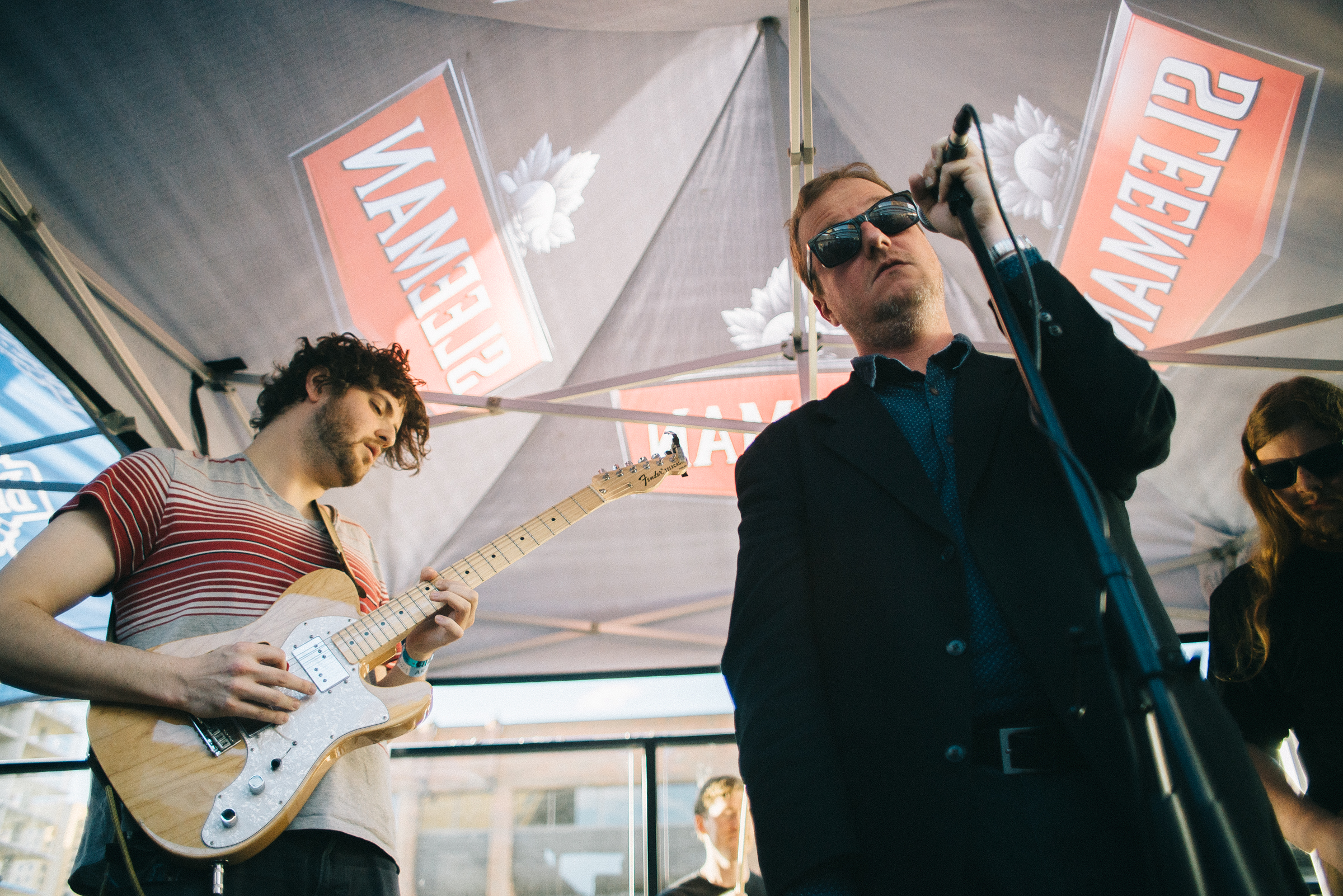
- Protomartyr at Sled Island 2016

Background information
- Origin: Detroit, Michigan, U.S.
- Genres: Post-punk; noise rock; art rock
- Years active: 2010–present
- Labels: Domino; Hardly Art; Urinal Cake; X!
- Spinoff of: Butt Babies
- Members: Joe Casey; Greg Ahee; Alex Leonard; Scott Davidson
- Website: protomartyrband.com

Protomartyr is an American post-punk band formed in Detroit, Michigan, in 2010. The band consists of Joe Casey (vocals), Greg Ahee (guitar), Alex Leonard (drums), and Scott Davidson (bass). During live performances, the band is currently joined by multi-instrumentalist Fred Thomas. Between 2020 and 2024, Kelley Deal joined the band in a touring capacity, providing additional keyboards, guitar and backing vocals.

To date, the band has released seven studio albums: No Passion All Technique (2012), Under Color of Official Right (2014), The Agent Intellect (2015), Relatives in Descent (2017), Ultimate Success Today (2020), Formal Growth in the Desert (2023), and Hotel Usona (2026).

== History ==
Prior to Protomartyr, Greg Ahee and Alex Leonard performed as a duo under the name Butt Babies. They later started playing with Joe Casey as Protomartyr. Kevin Boyer of Tyvek played bass and guitar in the band for a short time. In 2010, Scott Davidson joined on bass.

The band released their debut album, No Passion All Technique, in 2012 via Urinal Cake Records. This was followed by the four-track single "Colpi Proibiti" in the same year, via X! Records. Their second studio album, Under Color of Official Right, was released in April 2014 via the Hardly Art record label. A third studio album, The Agent Intellect, followed in October 2015. The album was critically acclaimed, achieving an 85/100 on accumulator website Metacritic, and featured in best of 2015 lists in The A.V. Club, Chicago Tribune, Rolling Stone, Metacritic, Spin, and Consequence of Sound.

Protomartyr signed to Domino Records in 2017, and released their fourth studio album, Relatives in Descent, on the label in September 2017. In 2019, the band reissued their out-of-print debut album with bonus tracks and released a music video for the song "Jumbo's". The group's fifth album, Ultimate Success Today, was originally scheduled to follow in May 2020, but was subsequently postponed to that July due to the COVID-19 pandemic. In 2023, the band released their sixth album, Formal Growth in the Desert.

The band's seventh studio album, Hotel Usona, was released on September 25, 2026 on Domino Records. The album was recorded in New York with producer Dave Fridmann, with the band "reckoning with the horrors of our current moment". Frontman and lyricist Joe Casey imagined "his country as an aging hotel... each song a room haunted by its own troublesome guest."

== Musical style ==
Protomartyr's music has been labeled as post-punk and punk rock. Josh Terry of Consequence of Sound stated that the band "blends the moody atmospherics of ‘70s U.K. post-punk with the raw sensibility of their Motor City garage-rock forebears." The band's sound was compared to other post-punk acts such as Wire, the Fall, Pere Ubu, the Constantines and Iceage, as well as local acts, most notably Tyvek. Vocalist Joe Casey also expressed appreciation for Pere Ubu and the Fall. His baritone vocals have been compared to Ian Curtis of Joy Division, Mark E. Smith of the Fall, and Nick Cave.

== Influence ==
Protomartyr have been cited as an influence by modern punk and post-punk bands such as Shame, Idles, Priests, The Dirty Nil, Vundabar, Meat Wave, Rendez-Vous, Dehd, Citizen, TV Priest, and The Devil Wears Prada. In an interview with Beats Per Minute in August 2020, Casey revealed that the lyric "shouted slogans of leapers" from the track "The Aphorist" off of Ultimate Success Today is a reference to "the young bands [that] I feel are attacking us and doing a shitty job at it, or a watered down version of us. But then the next line is 'Why didn't I smash the copier when I was through?' Because, when we started, people accused us of copying bands and not being original. So who am I complaining about those shitty bands when once I was a copier?"

In addition, the band has many notable fans. Iggy Pop has called them "the best band we’ve got in America right now" on his Radio 6 Music show. Ana da Silva of The Raincoats has called the band's music "so exciting and passionate and carries you to places where their imagination opens doors to yours" and praised Relatives in Descent. Greg Dulli of The Afghan Whigs is a fan of the band as is David Bazan of Pedro the Lion, the latter of whom called their music "the most perfect distillation of my taste in the world" and covered "The Devil in His Youth" for the 2017 anti-Trump compilation Our First 100 Days. Kelley Deal of The Breeders, an admirer of the band, has gone on to collaborate with them on numerous releases (most notably 2018's Consolation EP) and even played with them live on numerous dates as a special guest. When asked to name some of his more recent influences in 2017, Billy Gould of Faith No More named Protomartyr alongside musicians such as Burial and Getatchew Mekurya as those who "[make him] want to continue making music."

== Band members ==
Current members

- Joe Casey – vocals (2010–present)
- Greg Ahee – guitar (2010–present)
- Alex Leonard – drums (2010–present)
- Scott Davidson – bass guitar (2010–present)

Current touring members

- Fred Thomas – guitar, keyboards (2023–2024; 2026–present)

Former touring members

- Kelley Deal – keyboards, guitar, backing vocals (2020–2024)

== Discography ==
=== Studio albums ===
- No Passion All Technique (2012, Urinal Cake Records)
- Under Color of Official Right (2014, Hardly Art)
- The Agent Intellect (2015, Hardly Art)
- Relatives in Descent (2017, Domino)
- Ultimate Success Today (2020, Domino)
- Formal Growth in the Desert (2023, Domino)
- Hotel Usona (2026, Domino)

=== EPs ===
- Consolation (2018, Domino)

=== Live albums ===
- Rosé, a Fine Wine to Be Enjoyed by Couples or Friends at Any Occasion (2012, Double Tapes)
- Vari-Speed Mithridates (2013, Gold Tapes)
- Dredging the Grotto (2015, none)
- Security by Shadow (2020, none)
- Pin Eyes Under The Alder (2025, none)

=== Singles ===
- "Dreads 85 84" (7") (2012, Urinal Cake Records)
- "Colpi Proibiti" (7") (2012, X! Records)
- "Dope Cloud" (2015, Hardly Art)
- "Scum, Rise!" (2015, Hardly Art)
- "Jumbo's (Live)" (2015, Joyful Noise)
- "580 Memories" (2015, Joyful Noise)
- "Born to Be Wine" (2016, [adult swim])
- "My Children" (2017, Domino)
- "Don't Go to Anacita" (2017, Domino)
- "Wheel of Fortune" (2018, Domino)
- "Processed by the Boys" (2020, Domino)
- "Worm in Heaven" (2020, Domino)
- "Michigan Hammers" (2020, Domino)
- "Old Spool and Gurges 1" (2020, fund-raising Bandcamp-only release of two previously released songs: "Born to be Wine" and "French Poet")
- "Make Way" (2023, Domino)
- "Elimination Dances" (2023, Domino)
- "Polacrilex Kid" (2023, Domino)
- "Sounds We Cannot Hear" (2026, Domino)
- "Feed The Sewer" (2026, Domino)

=== Split and collaborative releases ===
- A Half of Seven: "Blues Festival"/"Loud Underneath" (with R. Ring) (2015, Hardly Art)
- Live at Vera: "Uncle Mother's"/"Barfuß durch die Scherben" (with Die Nerven) (2017, Roekie)
- Irony Prompts a Party Rat: "Corinthian Leather"/"Bags & Cans" (with Spray Paint) (2018, Monofonus Press)
- Telemetry at Howe Bridge: "Pontiac '87"/"Forbidden" (with Preoccupations) (2018, Domino)

== See also ==
- Music of Detroit
