= Danny Nedelko =

2018 single by British rock band Idles

Single by Idles

from the album Joy as an Act of Resistance
- Released: 5 June 2018
- Recorded: August–October 2017
- Genre: Punk rock; post-punk; Oi!
- Length: 3:24
- Label: Partisan
- Songwriter: Idles

Idles singles chronology
"Colossus" (2018)	"Danny Nedelko" (2018)	"Samaritans" (2018)

Music video
- "Danny Nedelko" on YouTube

"Danny Nedelko" is a song by British rock band Idles. The track was the second single from their second studio album, Joy as an Act of Resistance. The track was released as a single on 5 June 2018.

== Composition ==
The track is the story of Ukrainian immigrant Danny Nedelko, who is a close friend of the members of the band and the lead singer of the band Heavy Lungs. The song's lyrics take aim at and are heavily critical of nationalism, while making the focus of the song as a celebration of multiculturalism and diversity. The song celebrates various immigrants from Freddie Mercury to the "local Polish butcher".

Chris DeVille, writing for Stereogum described the track as "a bit of righteous post-punk agitprop that morphs into something like a soccer chant along the way, is a tribute to the immigrants that have taken so much heat from nationalists across Europe and America lately". Born Music compared the track to contemporary bands such as METZ, Savages and Protomartyr. The website also stated that although "the trademark growls from Joe Talbot are there, and the bouts of guitar feedback and angular riffage are present, this is a much more uplifting song".

== Critical reception ==
The song's message, and music video has been well-received by contemporary music critics. Chris DeVille, writing for Stereogum said of the song, "Nedelko is a total ham, and his charisma carries the concept to success". Rob Hakimian, writing for The 405 praised the lyricism and musicianship, calling "Danny Nedelko" "a rollicking torrent of guitars and chant-along lyricism. This is sure to become a live anthem that will galvanise fans all over the world."

Jennifer Buchanan, writing for Indie Shuffle described the song as "pure punk rock". "On “Danny Nedelko,” Idles shred guitar riffs over lyrics that address the current anti-immigration movement. It is a true song for the people. “Danny Nedelko” is downright catchy while maintaining Idles’ politically charged roots. The chanting chorus is unapologetically British and reminiscent of Buzzcocks. If there is a Bristol City football player whose name rhymes with "Danny Nedelko" he should expect to have this sung at him this season".

Jamie MacMillan, writing for Dork magazine raved the song's message, composition, and believed the track was important in the wake of the migrant crisis. Of the track, MacMillan said that "once again, IDLES show themselves to be a band willing to tackle the important subjects and turn it into moshpit gold. We’ve never needed them more."

== Live performances ==
"Danny Nedelko" made its television appearance on Later... with Jools Holland on 25 September 2018. The performance of "Nedelko" on Later... was described by DIY magazine as a chaotic and triumphant rendering of the song.

== Music video ==
The music video was directed by the members of Idles. It features Nedelko himself, who spends part of the time parodying Bob Dylan's "Subterranean Homesick Blues". Nedelko is wearing a T-shirt that reads, "no one is an island". Throughout the video, Nedelko poses for photos with immigrants to the United Kingdom, while posting with the "OK" hand gesture as an attempt to reclaim the gesture back from white nationalists. Alex Gallacher, writing for Folk Radio UK, described it as "an uplifting and unifying video".

The video was filmed in Bristol, England, where Idles and Heavy Lungs originate from.

== Charts ==
Chart performance for "Danny Nedelko"
Chart (2018)	Peak position
UK Physical Singles (Official Charts)	3
