= Consolation (EP) =

EP by Protomartyr
- Released: June 15, 2018
- Genre: Post-punk; art punk; noise rock; no wave
- Length: 14:11
- Label: Domino
- Producer: Protomartyr

Protomartyr chronology
Relatives in Descent (2017)	Consolation (2018)	Ultimate Success Today (2020)

Singles from Consolation
- 1. "Wheel of Fortune" Released: May 3, 2018

Consolation is an EP released by the American band Protomartyr in 2018. It features Kelley Deal on two of its four tracks and was released to critical acclaim from several sources.

== Content ==
Mark Deming of AllMusic described the EP as a "powerful and forbidding marriage of dynamic guitar-based rock and impassioned beat-inspired lyrics that painted a vivid portrait of a chaotic world". "Protomartyr’s new Consolation EP" writes Pitchfork's Jenn Pelly, "continues the discernibly politicized streak of Relatives in Descent—which also touched on Trumpism and Flint, Michigan’s water crisis."

The first half of the EP consists of two songs composed by Protomartyr themselves. The opener "Wait" "rumbles and bursts with the crescendoing ring of an alarm clock." The chorus of the track has been described as "anthemic" and has been compared to The Jesus Lizard and The Fall (Michael James Hall cites the track as proof of the band's influence on "vital" contemporary bands such as Shame and Idles.) Casey's lyrics on it have been described as "relatively abstracted verses, with lines about “a pair of fellas…punching the life out of each other” and “ironic T-shirts wet with blood.”" “Same Face in a Different Mirror” has been described as "atmospheric post-punk" and compared to Joy Division. Deming called it "that rare number from this band that expresses something approaching hope", a sentiment echoed in part by Hall who wrote that the track "staggers, swaggering and sputtering, slyly slipping in unmistakable melodies and the odd moment of kindness." Pelly described the track's theme as "a rumination on stagnant, grim parts of society coming into focus".

The second half of the EP consists of two songs featuring Kelley Deal. The first one, "Wheel of Fortune", was co-written by Deal and released as a single before the EP's release. The track begins with an "anxiety-inducing guitar squeal [which] gives way to a gothic fairytale, warped Disney soundscape" and has been described as "a world-ender of a song, batting away the horror with one hand, drawing it closer to the heart with the other." It then "abruptly and thrillingly shifts midway to a more dirge-like groove, before switching back." The track "details the grotesque waking nightmare of systematic oppression in America, which ensures some people have less a chance at survival—be it from police brutality, poisoned water, global warming, white supremacy, patriarchy, religious groups, or (as the title suggests) the predatory industry of gambling." Casey and Deal sing the "startling" chorus of “I decide who lives and who dies” together. The final track "You Always Win" was arranged by Deal, who also provided vocals. It has been described as a "delicately aslant closer" and a "far less direct but still affecting duet" in which "Deal's comparatively soothing backup vocals [...] enthrallingly contrast with [...] vocalist Joe Casey's gruff, Nick-Cave-meets-Mark-Kozelek speak-sing delivery." It has been called "a standout not just on the EP but in Protomartyr's canon". The track features viola, cello and bass clarinet, the use of which has been compared to that of the band Fucked Up. The instrumentation gives an "otherworldly, timeless vibe that clashes with Protomartyr's pummelling post-punk playing until inspired sparks fly." The lyrics are "an apparent comment on mortality, on growing “weak” and “grey” with another person."

== Release ==
The EP was released through Domino Recording Company in the US, UK and Europe. The track "Wheel of Fortune" was released as a single on the 3rd of May 2018. Its video, made available on YouTube, was directed by Yoonha Park (who had also directed the video for the single "Don't Go To Anacita" from their previous album). It has been described as "an amalgamation of bleak, violent imagery [...] A pulsing skull, a charging, electrified sword, a girl coloring in her entire face with cherry red lipstick, roughly scrapping [sic] your knuckle against a brick wall, punching yourself in the face, giving a thumbs up while your hand is on fire flash [...] The general vibe is spooky Halloween apocalypse."

== Reception ==
Professional ratings
Aggregate scores
Source	Rating
AnyDecentMusic?	7.6/10
Metacritic	81/100
Review scores
Source	Rating
Allmusic	3.5/5 stars
DIY	4/5 stars
Drowned in Sound	8/10
Exclaim!	8/10
The Line of Best Fit	8/10
OndaRock	7/10
Pitchfork	7.7/10
Popmatters	8/10 stars
The Skinny	4/5 stars
Under the Radar	8/10 stars

The EP has received "universal acclaim" according to Metacritic, with a score of 81/100 based on 8 reviews. The last two tracks in particular were very well received by numerous publications Despite calling it "a stopgap four-song EP and not the group's next major statement", Deming wrote: "There are not a lot of bands who do what Protomartyr does, and even if there were, the skill and fury of their music would still set them apart, and Consolation is a brief but potent reminder that they're a force to be reckoned with." "Protomartyr has yet to let us down," writes Maria Schurr, "and Consolation assures that they aren't going to anytime soon." Kylie Mullin called it "one of 2018's most unique offerings. Rumour has it Protomartyr will soon flip the scenario and produce a forthcoming release by Deal and her R. Ring bandmates. After hearing their vivid chemistry on Consolation E.P., you'll instantly anticipate that next Deal-Protomartyr teamup."

=== Accolades ===
Brooklyn Vegan ranked it the best EP of the year.

== Track listing ==
All tracks are written by Protomartyr except where noted.

No.	Title	Writer(s)	Length
1.	"Wait"		2:10
2.	"Same Face in a Different Mirror"		2:48
3.	"Wheel of Fortune"	Protomartyr, Kelley Deal	5:16
4.	"You Always Win"		3:57
Total length:			14:11

== Personnel ==
Protomartyr

- Vocals – Joe Casey
- Bass – Scott Davidson
- Synthesizer, piano, guitar – Greg Ahee
- Drums – Alex Leonard

Additional musicians

- Vocals – Kelley Deal (tracks 3, 4)
- Bass clarinet – Evan Ziporyn
- Cello – Lori Goldston
- Viola – Jocelyn Hach

Other

- Photography – Davidde Stella
- Producer – Protomartyr
- Recording, mixing, mastering – Mike Montgomery

== Charts ==
Consolation EP chart (2018)
Chart	Peak position
US Independent Albums (Billboard)	50
US Heatseekers Albums (Billboard)	13
