= The Agent Intellect =

Studio album by Protomartyr
- Released: 9 October 2015
- Recorded: The Key Club in Benton Harbor, Michigan
- Genres: Post-punk; indie rock; noise rock
- Length: 44:11
- Label: Hardly Art

Protomartyr chronology
Under Color of Official Right (2014)	The Agent Intellect (2015)	Relatives in Descent (2017)

Singles from The Agent Intellect
- 1. "Why Does It Shake?" Released: 14 July 2015; 2. "Dope Cloud" Released: 25 August 2015; 3. "I Forgive You" Released: September 28, 2015

The Agent Intellect is the third studio album by Detroit post-punk band Protomartyr, released on 9 October 2015 on Hardly Art. Produced, recorded and mixed by Bill Skibbe at Key Club Recording in Benton Harbor, Michigan, the album was preceded by the singles, "Why Does It Shake?", "Dope Cloud" and "I Forgive You".

The album is named after an ancient medieval philosophical questioning of how the mind operates in relation to the so-called active intellect, also known as agent intellect and other names. The album was released to widespread critical acclaim, increasing Protomartyr's exposure significantly, and placed highly on several critics and publications' end-of-year lists.

== Background and recording ==
After touring extensively in support of their previous studio album, Under Color of Official Right (2014), the band wrote The Agent Intellect collectively at bass guitarist Scott Davidson's basement; a practice space the band collectively named the "No Bummer Zone". Frontman Joe Casey reflected: "We’d go over there a couple of times a week. I was still working as the doorman at a comedy club at the time. It was before we thought that rock’n’roll was gonna save us. I remember writing stuff pretty quick, and I do remember that was the first time we were like, ‘let’s really try to write different stuff, let’s try to experiment.’"

== Release ==
Professional ratings
Aggregate scores
Source	Rating
AnyDecentMusic?	8.0/10
Metacritic	85/100
Review scores
Source	Rating
AllMusic	4/5 stars
The A.V. Club	B+
Chicago Tribune	4/4 stars
Consequence of Sound	A−
The Guardian	4/5 stars
NME	4/5
Pitchfork	8.2/10
Q	4/5 stars
Rolling Stone	4/5 stars
Spin	8/10

=== Critical reception ===
The Agent Intellect was met with positive reviews from contemporary reviewers. At Metacritic, which assigns a normalized rating out of 100 to reviews from mainstream critics, the album received an average score of 85, which indicates "Universal acclaim", based on 20 reviews. The Guardian critic Kate Hutchinson thought: "This isn’t spiky postpunk like their last album – it’s more unhinged: they’ve swapped hooks for a dirgy epicness, distortion bulldozes through, sometimes flaring angrily, punctured by driving, truly affecting drums. As poignant as those images of a decrepit Motor City, once brilliant, now decayed." Sam Lefebvre of Paste magazine described the album as "an album of spindly bass, needling guitar and economical drums." Lefebvre further added "And yet, with Protomartyr’s inventive ensemble flare, it sounds like much more."

Kyle Ryan of The A.V. Club thought that: "The Agent Intellect is an impressive addition to the band’s small discography, and it hints that bigger, bolder work may lay ahead.". AllMusic thought that: "Protomartyr's music is smart without wearing its intellect on its sleeve, and physically strong enough to support the ideas lurking behind Casey's lyrics, and The Agent Intellect is an album that challenges both the mind and the body; if you're looking for further confirmation that Protomartyr are one of the smartest and toughest bands of their day, this album is what you need.". In a review for Rolling Stone, Zach Kelly thought that: this LP feels like a testament to perseverance, with world-weary humor and introspection providing flashes of clarity".

=== Accolades & covers ===
Pitchfork and Pretty Much Amazing ranked the track "Dope Cloud" the 98th and 89th best track of 2015 respectively. Thrillist included it on their list "The 25 Most 'Detroit' Songs Ever Recorded".

Oliver Ackermann of A Place to Bury Strangers included The Agent Intellect among his favorite albums of the year, calling it a "[f]ucking wicked record." In 2017, David Bazan of Pedro The Lion fame covered "The Devil in His Youth" for the anti-Trump compilation Our First 100 Days. Preoccupations covered the track "Pontiac 87" as the b-side of a split single with Protomartyr in 2018.

=== Year-end ===
Publication	Accolade	Year	Rank
The A.V. Club	The 15 Best Albums of 2015	2015	11
Chicago Tribune (Greg Kot)	The 10 Best Albums of 2015	2015	3
Rolling Stone (Rob Sheffield)	The Top 20 Albums of 2015	2015	9
Metacritic	The Best Albums of 2015	2015	17
Spin	The 50 Best Albums of 2015	2015	20
Consequence of Sound	Top 50 Albums of 2015	2015	13

=== Miscellaneous ===
Publication	Country	Accolade	Year	Rank
Aquarium Drunkard	US	Decade / 2010-19	2019	-
Spex	Germany	Best Albums 2010-2019	2019	178
Dansende Beren	Netherlands	100 Best Albums of the Decade (2010-2019) - International	2019	-
Kalporz	Italy	The Best Albums of the 2010s	2019	29
[sic] Magazine	US	Sub-Ed’s Top 100 Albums Of The Decade	2020	34

== Usage in media ==
The song "Cowards Starve" has been used in the third episode of 13 Reasons Why's first season.

== Track listing ==
All tracks are written by Protomartyr.

No.	Title	Length
1.	"The Devil in His Youth"	2:39
2.	"Cowards Starve"	3:38
3.	"I Forgive You"	3:03
4.	"Boyce or Boice"	3:39
5.	"Pontiac 87"	4:33
6.	"Uncle Mother's"	4:21
7.	"Dope Cloud"	2:58
8.	"The Hermit"	2:34
9.	"Clandestine Time"	3:09
10.	"Why Does It Shake?"	4:47
11.	"Ellen"	6:24
12.	"Feast of Stephen"	2:26
Total length:		44:11

== Personnel ==
- Bass Guitar – Scott Davidson
- Drums – Alex Leonard
- Guitar, Keyboards – Greg Ahee
- Vocals – Joe Casey
- Writing ["All Songs By"] – Protomartyr

Additional credits

- Mastering – Sarah Register
- Recording, Mixing – Bill Skibbe
- Recording ["Additional"] – Derek Stanton
- Vocals ["Additional"] – Dina Bankole, Jenny Junior

== Charts ==
Chart (2015)	Peak position
US Top Heatseekers Albums (Billboard)	3
