= Sound on Sound (album) =

Studio album by Saturday Looks Good to Me
- Released: February 14, 2006
- Genre: Indie pop
- Length: 1:19:05
- Label: Redder Records
- Producer: Fred Thomas

Saturday Looks Good to Me chronology
Every Night (2003)	Sound on Sound (2006)	Fill Up the Room (2007)

Professional ratings
Review scores
Source	Rating
Allmusic	4/5 stars
Pitchfork Media	(7.7/10)

Sound on Sound is the sixth album to be released by Saturday Looks Good to Me. The record serves as a collection of difficult to find tracks and rarities released by the band from its formation in 2000 through to 2005. The tracks are listed in chronological order.

== Track listing ==
No.	Title	Length
1.	"Can't Ever Sleep"	3:14
2.	"Listen to My Heart"	1:53
3.	"Nervous"	3:13
4.	"It Sounds Like They're In Love With You"	3:26
5.	"Liquor Store"	1:11
6.	"Your Small Heart"	2:26
7.	"Summer Doesn't Count (Unless You're Here With Me)"	3:06
8.	"Love Will Find You"	3:48
9.	"Labcoat"	1:57
10.	"Pet Store"	3:05
11.	"One Hundred People"	2:04
12.	"[Untitled Track]"	1:19
13.	"Mistletoe"	2:21
14.	"Lift Me Up"	2:49
15.	"Light Bulb Heart"	1:26
16.	"Diary"	1:46
17.	"When You Go Out Tonight"	2:40
18.	"Girl of Mine"	2:20
19.	"Until the World Stops Spinning"	2:42
20.	"Hiding"	2:33
21.	"Learn to Live With Your Heartbreaks"	3:43
22.	"This Time Every Year"	2:48
23.	"Blue Christmas"	2:32
24.	"Christmas Blues"	3:16
25.	"Parking Lot Blues"	3:08
26.	"I Don't Want to Go"	2:59
27.	"Disaster"	3:38
28.	"The Girl's Distracted"	2:02
29.	"Last Year"	3:56
30.	"Own"	1:44
