= One Kiss Ends It All =

Studio album by Saturday Looks Good to Me
- Released: May 21, 2013
- Recorded: March – October 2012
- Studio: Backseat Productions, Ann Arbor, Michigan
- Genre: Indie pop
- Length: 39:11
- Label: Polyvinyl Records

Saturday Looks Good to Me chronology
Fill Up the Room (2007)	One Kiss Ends It All (2013)

Professional ratings
Aggregate scores
Source	Rating
Metacritic	71/100
Review scores
Source	Rating
Allmusic	4/5 stars
Exclaim!	6/10
Pitchfork	7.0/10 stars
PopMatters	7.0/10 stars
The Skinny	3/5 stars
Under the Radar	5.5/10

One Kiss Ends It All is the eighth album by Saturday Looks Good to Me. It was released on May 21, 2013 through Polyvinyl Records.

== Critical reception ==
One Kiss Ends It All was met with generally favorable reviews from critics. At Metacritic, which assigns a weighted average rating out of 100 to reviews from mainstream publications, this release received an average score of 71, based on 9 reviews.

== Track listing ==
No.	Title	Length
1.	"One Kiss"	1:33
2.	"Invisible Friend"	2:18
3.	"Empty Beach"	3:22
4.	"Negative Space"	3:19
5.	"New City"	3:10
6.	"The Everpresent New Times Condition"	5:03
7.	"Break In"	3:00
8.	"Polar Bear"	3:16
9.	"Are You Kissing Anyone?"	1:39
10.	"Johnny"	2:11
11.	"Sunglasses"	4:03
12.	"Space Children"	6:17
