= Fill Up the Room =

Studio album by Saturday Looks Good to Me
- Released: October 23, 2007
- Genre: Indie pop
- Length: 40:14
- Labels: (United States) K Records (United Kingdom) How Does It Feel To Be Loved?
- Producer: Fred Thomas

Saturday Looks Good to Me chronology
Sound on Sound (2006)	Fill Up the Room (2007)	One Kiss Ends It All (2013)

Professional ratings
Review scores
Source	Rating
Allmusic	4/5 stars
NME	6/10 stars
Pitchfork Media	(7.7/10)
PopMatters	7/10 stars
Tiny Mix Tapes	4/5 stars

Fill Up the Room is the seventh album by Michigan collective Saturday Looks Good to Me. It was released on October 23, 2007, on K Records.

== Track listing ==
No.	Title	Length
1.	"Apple"	2:52
2.	"(Even If You Die On the) Ocean"	3:18
3.	"When I Lose My Eyes"	6:49
4.	"Make a Plan"	4:08
5.	"Peg"	1:49
6.	"Money In the Afterlife"	5:25
7.	"The Americans"	2:37
8.	"Edison Girls"	2:46
9.	"Hands In the Snow"	3:30
10.	"Come With Your Arms"	4:30
11.	"Whitey Hands"	2:35
12.	"No Reaction (UK bonus track)"	2:31
13.	"No Reception (UK bonus track)"	2:51

== Personnel ==
- Fred Thomas – vocals, guitar, melodica, piano, chamberlin, synthesizer, glockenspiel, electric bass, drum set, percussion, tapes
- Scott Sellwood – vocals, melodica, piano, electric piano, harpsichord, organ, glockenspiel, percussion
- Dana Carole Beck – vocals
- Betty Marie Barnes – vocals
- Jacob Danziger – violin
- Anna Steinhoff – cello
- Zach Wallace – harmonica, double bass
- Elliot Bergman – saxophone, organ
- Juan Garcia – electric bass, hand claps, percussion
- Scott DeRoche – electric bass
- Steve Middlekauf – drum set, hand claps, percussion
- Charles Koltak – drum set, percussion
