= All Gas No Brakes (album) =

Studio album by Heavy Lungs
- Released: 29 September 2023
- Recorded: 2022–2023
- Studio: Holy Mountain Studio
- Genre: Grunge; post-punk; noise rock
- Length: 35:20
- Label: Alcopop!
- Producer: Chris Fullard

Heavy Lungs chronology
Measure (2019)	All Gas No Brakes (2023)	Caviar (2025)

Singles from All Gas No Brakes
- 1. "Dancing Man" Released: 3 May 2023; 2. "All Gas No Brakes" Released: 14 June 2023; 3. "Head Tilter" Released: 16 August 2023

All Gas No Brakes is the debut studio album by British noise rock band Heavy Lungs. The album was released on 29 September 2023.

== Critical reception ==
Professional ratings
Review scores
Source	Rating
Distorted Sound	9/10
Dork	4/5 stars
Narc	4/5 stars

All Gas No Breaks met with mixed to positive critical reviews. Writing for Dork, Emma Quin described the album's sound as a "grungy, downer energy of Nirvana paired with the brash use of synths and noisy riffage, Heavy Lungs' debut album All Gas No Brakes is loud, aggressive and bleak, laced with a tinge of humour and crafted with immense talent and precision." Writing for Distorted Sound, Jack McGill described the album as a promising debut given its willingness to experiment, saying that "elasticity that Heavy Lungs operate with throughout All Gas No Brakes is promising for post-punk in the UK which is becoming increasingly similar to stand still traffic on the motorway. McGill gave the album a 9 out of 10.

Writing for Narc, Robin Webb described the album as "a big album in sound and outlook". Webb further said that the album "takes the Bristol punk ethos championed by good friends Idles to punky delinquent, even metal-esque, new heights. The actual Danny Nedelko heads up the sonic bludgeoning by the self aggrandised 'loud band'." Webb gave the album four stars out of five.

== Track listing ==
All tracks are written by Danny Nedelko, James Minchall, George Garratt and Oliver Southgate.

All Gas No Brakes track listing
No.	Title	Length
1.	"Matryoshka"	3:18
2.	"All Gas No Brakes"	4:07
3.	"Late to the Party"	3:06
4.	"Dancing Man"	2:00
5.	"Angle Grinder"	4:17
6.	"Plagiarism"	3:07
7.	"Head Tilter"	3:53
8.	"It's Been"	2:54
9.	"Rock, Paper, Scissors"	3:09
10.	"2 Hot 2 Ride"	1:35
11.	"Sometimes People Just Explode"	3:54
Total length:		35:20

== Personnel ==
- Danny Nedelko — vocals, synth
- James Minchall — bass
- George Garratt — drums, vocals
- Oliver Southgate — guitars, vocals, synth

Additional musicians

- Dom Mitchison — synth

Production

- Chris Fullard — chief engineer, mixing
- Stanley Gravett — assistant engineer
- Adam Gonsalves — mastering

Artwork

- Hamish Trevis — photography
- Caine McGinley — album artwork
