= Every Night (Saturday Looks Good to Me album) =

Studio album by Saturday Looks Good to Me
- Released: September 14, 2004
- Genre: Indie rock
- Length: 38:12
- Label: Polyvinyl
- Producer: Fred Thomas

Saturday Looks Good to Me chronology
All Your Summer Songs (2002)	Every Night (2004)	Sound on Sound (2006)

Professional ratings
Review scores
Source	Rating
Allmusic	4/5 stars
Pitchfork Media	7.5/10 stars

Every Night is an album by Saturday Looks Good to Me. It was released on September 14, 2004 on Polyvinyl.

== Track listing ==
No.	Title	Length
1.	"Since You Stole My Heart"	3:13
2.	"Until The World Stops Spinning"	2:55
3.	"Keep Walking"	2:37
4.	"All Over Town"	2:56
5.	"The Girl's Distracted"	1:59
6.	"If You Ask"	4:49
7.	"Empty Room"	2:15
8.	"When the Party Ends"	4:01
9.	"Dialtone"	3:31
10.	"We Can't Work It Out"	3:37
11.	"Life Me Up"	2:44
12.	"When You Got To New York"	3:35

The LP and CD have a few songs that feature different mixes and singers.
