= Saturday Looks Good to Me =

American indie pop band

- Origin: Ann Arbor, Michigan, United States
- Genre: Indie pop
- Years active: 1999–present
- Labels: K Records (United States); Polyvinyl (United States); Popfrenzy (Australia); HDIF (United Kingdom)
- Members: Fred Thomas; Scott DeRoche; Caroline Catherine; Amber Fellows; Shelley Salant
- Past members: Scott Sellwood; Juan Briz Garcia; Ryan Howard; Andrew Hoepfner; Betty Marie Barnes; Chris Bathgate; Carol Gray; Josh Bay; Autumn Wetli

Saturday Looks Good to Me is an American indie pop band that formed in 1999. The group is led by singer-songwriter, producer, and multi-instrumentalist Fred Thomas (former member of His Name Is Alive). Albums by the group are known for soundscapes which hearken back to Detroit soul.

The band was originally conceived as a basement recording project and did not play any live shows until 2002. The band built up a considerable following on the back of numerous limited-edition 7" record and CD-R releases, resulting in the indie pop albums All Your Summer Songs, released in 2003 on Polyvinyl Records, and Every Night, released in 2004 on Polyvinyl. All Your Summer Songs was listed as one of the top 50 albums of 2003 by Pitchfork. Every Night introduced new singer Betty Marie Barnes, who became the nearest to a permanent female singer that the band ever had.

By 2007, Barnes had semi-left the band and Thomas took over as the band's sole front person. SLGTM's music also changed and the resulting Fill Up The Room (2007, K Recs) album was more adventurous both lyrically and musically than the band's previous two albums.

Following another European tour in 2008, Thomas retired the band to concentrate on other projects including City Center, and his record label, Life Like.

The band reunited in 2012 with a changed line-up, and released "Sunglasses" on Polyvinyl Records. For Record Store Day 2012, All Your Summer Songs was re-issued on white vinyl in a special limited edition of 250. The band released One Kiss Ends It All in 2013, and continued touring into 2015.

== Discography ==
=== Albums ===
- Saturday Looks Good to Me (hereforeveralways, 2000)
- Cruel August Moon (Little Hands, 2001)
- Love Will Find You (Whistletap, 2002)
- All Your Summer Songs (Polyvinyl, 2003)
- Every Night (Polyvinyl, 2004)
- Sound on Sound (Redder Records, 2006)
- Fill Up the Room (K Records / How Does It Feel To Be Loved, 2007)
- One Kiss Ends It All (Polyvinyl, 2013)

=== Other releases ===
- Cassingle Series #3 (Sanitary Records, April 2006)
- "The Girl Is Distracted"
- Green Mansions (limited tour EP)
- "Money in the Afterlife" / "All the Sidewalk Birds" (Ernest Jenning Record Co., February 20, 2007)
- Cold Colors EP (Polyvinyl – July 24, 2007)
- "Dianne Falling Off Her Horse" / "Springtime Judgment" (Ernest Jenning Record Co., July 8, 2008)
- "Saturday Looks Good to Me : Tour Tape" cassette (Life Like – 2012)
- "Sunglasses" (Polyvinyl, 2012)
