= No Passion All Technique =

Studio album by Protomartyr
- Released: October 8, 2012
- Recorded: November 2011
- Genres: Garage rock; post-punk; noise rock
- Length: 38:19
- Label: Urinal Cake Records (original) Domino (reissue)
- Producer: Protomartyr

Protomartyr chronology
No Passion All Technique (2012)	Under Color of Official Right (2014)

No Passion All Technique is the debut studio album by American post-punk band Protomartyr. Released through Urinal Cake Records in 2012, the album went quickly out of print and subsequently became a "collector's item". In May 2019, the band reissued the album with bonus tracks.

== Recording ==
According to the album's official Bandcamp page, the band "stepped into a studio together for the first time, in November of 2011 [...] With only four hours of studio time booked and one case of beer between them, their plan was to walk out with enough songs for a seven-inch single. Instead, at the suggestion of engineer Chris Koltay, the newly formed Detroit outfit recorded as much as they possibly could, in what little time they had. They left with 21 songs—enough material for two singles *and* a full-length album [...]." According to Casey: "My memory is shot, but I appreciate now, looking back, how raw and off-the-cuff it was. There’s tons of mistakes in it and that wasn’t because we planned on it. We still can’t really admit that it’s as good as it is. You never want to say that your first is the best, but I’m happy that the first ended up not being terrible. It gave us doorway to what we’d want to do later.”

== Themes ==
The songs on this album are lyrically set in the city of Detroit. According to Ryan Reft, the lyrics feature a "mix of resiliency, stoicism, and resignation [...] Machinists fill themselves with bottle after bottle of “High Life” on the weekend, but hardly remain confined by such an existence: “There are things that are built in the skulls of men.” On “3 Swallows,” Casey finds a place between desperation and hope: “Uninvincible, close but not pitiful, I discovered to drink it slowly, the great unfolding, and wait for their arms to hold me.”" Evan Minsker writes: "Scouring the lyrics sheet for No Passion All Technique, you'll find cold detachment and cynicism all over the place. [...] But this album is never bitter, and it's never a slog. A song like "Feral Cats" even borders on absurdity. [...] [W]ith a big triumphant hook and a shouted vocal, they sing, "Just like feral cats!" [...] It's a song delivered with either gravity or a smirk, and either way, it's a great song." The song "Ypsilanti" was inspired by the book The Three Christs of Ypsilanti by Milton Rokeach. "Too Many Jewels" even quotes directly from the aforementioned book.

== Cover ==
The album cover features a picture of J. Robert Oppenheimer.

== Release ==
225 copies of the album were pressed by Urinal Cakes Records on vinyl in 2012, with another 75 being pressed on clear vinyl. The band also self-released the album on cassette.

In March 2019, the band announced that they were going to reissue the album and release it with 4 bonus tracks (3 from the Dreads 85 84 7" and one hitherto unreleased track) on May 3 through Domino Recording Company. A music video for the track "Jumbo's" (directed by long-time collaborator Yoonha Park) was released online on 5 March.

== Reception ==
=== Initial ===
Professional ratings
Review scores
Source	Rating
AllMusic	3.5/5 stars
Crack	favorable
Pitchfork	7.8/10

Due to its limited circulation, the album received very little critical attention. Pitchfork's Evan Minsker writes that though the album "takes several Detroit reference points in its stride, it's more than "a Detroit record": Their characters aren't hollow archetypes, but people with ideas, struggles, and stories set to dextrously played speed punk, psych melodies, and gentle fingerpicking [...] For a debut LP, No Passion All Technique is an impressive showing of sonic, lyrical, and emotional range, and it all falls under a cohesive banner." Crack magazine compared the music to "late-era Black Flag" and Pissed Jeans, praising "the smart storytelling skills and brilliantly sardonic humor of vocalist Joe Casey." Jon Treneff of Dusted compared Casey to Mark E. Smith and Chris Thomson of Circus Lupus and compared the band as a whole to The Fall and Eddy Current Suppression Ring. "A band capable of serviceably [sic] capturing the spirit of any of the aforementioned would be worth noting," he writes, "but the truly impressive thing about No Passion All Technique is that it doesn't simply focus the laser on any one point; instead, it moves through all those speeds convincingly without coming off as a tourist, while staying well enough within the Venn diagram to hold it all together."

=== Reissue ===
Professional ratings
Review scores
Source	Rating
Exclaim!	7/10
The Line of Best Fit	8/10
Loud and Quiet	7/10
MusicOMH	4.5/5 stars
Ox-Fanzine	4/5 stars
PopMatters	8/10 stars

The reissue received positive reviews upon its release in 2019. Ross Horton of MusicOMH called it "an essential reissue of an incredible debut record, [...] it’s also an artefact that we can view with some measure of context. This is the skeleton key to unlocking all of the rest of Protomartyr’s dense and unyielding back catalogue." Lucy Boosey of The Line of Best Fit called it "a record of decadence to behold, pouring filth and work into an album that has yet been little heard [...]" Others, like Abi Crawford of Loud and Quiet criticized the "one-track garage sound, [...] boring things like production value are on the more primitive and muddy side too [...]" Brad Garcia of Exclaim! compared the album unfavorably to the band's later work, calling it "fairly harsh and often sloppy".

Charts (2019)

No Passion All Technique album chart
Chart	Peak position
US Heatseekers Albums (Billboard)	16
US Top Rock Albums (Billboard)	16
US Independent Albums (Billboard)	43

== Track listing ==
No.	Title	Length
1.	"In My Sphere"	3:44
2.	"Machinist Man"	2:44
3.	"Hot Wheel City"	1:35
4.	"3 Swallows"	2:21
5.	"Free Supper"	3:12
6.	"Jumbo's"	4:28
7.	"Ypsilanti"	3:12
8.	"Too Many Jewels"	3:51
9.	"(Don't You) Call Me Out My Name"	1:06
10.	"How He Lived After He Died"	2:54
11.	"Feral Cats"	2:51
12.	"Wine of Ape"	1:21
13.	"Principalities"	3:40

The following bonus tracks appeared on the album's 2019 reissue:

1. "King Boots"
2. "Bubba Helms"
3. "Cartier E.G.s"
4. "Whatever Happened to the Saturn Boys?"

== Personnel ==
- Joe Casey - vocals
- Greg Ahee - guitar
- Scott Davidson - bass
- Alex Leonard - drums

Additional credits

- Chris Koltay - engineering
