= Fred Thomas (rock musician) =

American indie rock musician

- Born: August 6, 1976 (age 49); Ypsilanti, Michigan
- Genres: Indie rock
- Occupations: Singer; musician; songwriter
- Years active: 1994–present
- Label: Polyvinyl

Fred Thomas (born August 6, 1976) is an American indie rock singer and multi-instrumentalist who was described by Mark Deming of AllMusic as "[o]ne of the most influential figures on Michigan's indie rock scene". Thomas founded the math rock band Chore in 1994. After this band broke up in 1996, he joined His Name Is Alive in addition to serving as a member of Lovesick and Flashpapr. He founded the band Saturday Looks Good to Me in 1999, and it released four studio albums before going on hiatus in 2008.

Thomas has also released music as a solo artist, beginning with the 2002 album Everything Is Pretty Much Totally Fucked Up. Over the following 20 years or more, Fred has remained active in the Michigan experimental music scene and is currently fronting a three-piece guitar rock project, Idle Ray, while continuing to release albums of instrumental electronic music under his own name.. Thomas released a trilogy of acclaimed indie rock albums through the mid 10s, All Are Saved (2015), Changer (2017) and 2018's Aftering, which featured contributions from Anna Burch and Elliot Bergman. He returned to a similar style in 2024 on his most recent song based solo release, Window in the Rhythm

== Discography ==
=== Albums ===
- Everything Is Pretty Much Totally Fucked Up (Little Hands, 2002)
- I Heard the Angels Sing (Ypsilanti, 2003)
- Turn It Down (Polyvinyl, 2004)
- Sink Like a Symphony (Corleone, 2006)
- Flood (Magic Marker, 2007)
- Old News (Ypsilanti, 2008)
- Night Times (self-released, 2010)
- Kuma (Ernest Jenning, 2012)
- All Are Saved (Polyvinyl, 2015)
- Changer (Polyvinyl, 2017)
- Aftering (Polyvinyl, 2018)
- Dream Erosion (Life Like, 2020)
- Those Dreams Are Dust, Dream Erosion Pt. II (Dagoretti, 2022)
- Window in the Rhythm (Polyvinyl, 2024)

=== Compilation ===
- Another Song About Riding The Bus - Selected Songs 2002 - 2020 (Antiquated Future, 2020)

=== EPs ===
- Fred Thomas (CDr, Ypsilanti, 2001)
- Tour EP (CDr, Ypsilanti, 2002)
- Birdsong (with Juan Garcia, CDr, Ypsilanti, 2005)
- Up North (Split cassette release with Troy Graham, Van Party Tapes, 2014)

=== Singles ===
List of singles, showing year released and album name
Title	Year	Album
"Les Etoiles Secretes" (split release with Elizabeth Mitchell)	2001	Non LP Singles
"No One Will Ever Make Me Feel This Way Again"	2002	Non LP Singles
"Your Side Of The Night"	2002	Non LP Singles
"The Dancefloor Dreams" (split release with Nedelle)	2005	Old News
"Well"	2012	Kuma
"Bad Blood"	2015	All Are Saved
"Cops Don't Care pt. II"	2015	All Are Saved
"Every Song Sung To A Dog"	2015	All Are Saved
"Brickwall"	2016	Changer
"Echolocation"	2016	Changer
"Voiceover"	2016	Changer
"Mallwalkers"	2017	Changer
"Good Times Are Gone Again"	2018	Aftering
"House Show, Late December"	2018	Aftering
"Altar"	2018	Aftering
"Parkways" (split release with Anna Burch)	2018	Non-LP Single
