= Relatives in Descent =

Studio album by Protomartyr
- Released: 29 September 2017
- Studio: 64 Sound (Los Angeles)
- Genres: Post-punk; art punk; noise rock
- Length: 43:35
- Label: Domino
- Producers: Protomartyr and Sonny DiPerri

Protomartyr chronology
The Agent Intellect (2015)	Relatives in Descent (2017)	Consolation (2018)

Singles from Relatives in Descent
- 1. "A Private Understanding" Released: July 10, 2017; 2. "My Children" Released: August 15, 2017; 3. "Don't Go to Anacita" Released: October 27, 2017

Relatives in Descent is the fourth studio album by American post-punk band Protomartyr released on 29 September 2017. Their first to be released through Domino Recording Company, the album is much darker and more philosophical than its predecessors. While lyrically not a concept album, it is produced so that many songs flow from one to another seamlessly. Relatives in Descent received critical acclaim upon release, with many publications ranking it one of the best albums of the year.

== Recording ==
The band hired Sonny DiPerri to co-produce this album (known for his work with Animal Collective). In an interview, lead singer Joe Casey said that "we knew we wanted to go someplace different to record than the previous two records, so we wouldn't get in a rut [...] what was so great about Sonny was that he was very locked in to what we wanted." He said that the band "wanted to record somewhere warm and we went to California. Usually, we are recording in Michigan and it is characteristically cold." According to Casey, the change in recording location also helped them write more complicated songs than before.

Guitarist Greg Ahee "was kind of enthralled with a certain kind of violin sound we heard [...] on a Raincoats record called Odyshape and then he wanted violin on the record. At first we heard it, and we all just thought, 'Ah shit, I don't know if that's going to work or not.'" He was also influenced by Mica Levi's score to Under the Skin. Asked on the source of the album's direction, Casey said: "For this record, we had just come off the road after doing a lot of touring. There were a lot of aches and pains so there was a lot of references to guts and generally feeling unwell. After the tour, my house also flooded. Before then, it had this smell of smoke and dust. Now I've got this mildew smell on top of that and the combination of these sensations and smell kind of infected the record."

== Content ==
=== Style ===
According to John Pareles:

[O]n its fourth album, the band is moving toward an idiom that's more flexible and contrasty yet just as gripping: Protomartyr's own post-post-punk. Its expanded vocabulary includes relentless Minimalist repetition, melodic (though still jagged) guitar leads, precise gradations of clarity and distortion, violin parts that subtly link tracks together and song structures that keep taking left turns.

Greg Kot describes the instrumentation as thus:

Greg Ahee's guitar ambushes the arrangements. It lunges out of the silence in "A Private Understanding" and "Windsor Hum." Bassist Scott Davidson knows when to push the melody and when to anchor the chaos with a steady pulse. Drummer Alex Leonard complements Casey's delivery rather than overwhelming it, his touch unerring yet spacious.

=== Themes ===
According to NPR, the album is "a collection of lyrically dense, deeply philosophical [...] songs that grapple with some of life's thorniest questions: What does it mean to be human? What is truth? What is the nature of good and evil?". Casey refuses to classify the album as "an anti-Trump album [...] I don't think this album is any more political than our previous records, but people are picking up on it more because it's a constant bombardment" despite being "half informed by America, post-election". "A Private Understanding", which is "almost a worldwide proclamation about the dire state of things (with apocalyptic trumpets even)", references Elvis Presley's vision of Jesus in a desert and the Flint water crisis. "Here is The Thing" is a "repeat of the same feeling but with a more personal, local take", the titular "Thing" being "unfettered capitalism at the expense of humanity." The song "My Children" deals with "legacy and what we leave behind: offspring, stone monuments, genetics [...]" and includes a reference to David Bowie. "Windsor Hum" references a real phenomenon in its title, "a very low frequency hum [...] described as a massive refrigerator running. It's constant, so if you do hear it, you can't get it out of your head and it can drive you crazy" that one can hear emanating from Windsor "across the river". "Caitriona" references the main character of Cré na Cille by Máirtín Ó Cadhain and describes "an afterlife of comically complaining in your coffin about everything, including your stupid son, for all eternity." "The Chuckler" "is about trying to get through the day-to-day grind of living with all its loneliness and frustrations while the shadow of global meltdown darkens your door. I would describe the chuckle of the main character as being very, very hollow." The imaginary titular city in "Don't Go To Anacita" is a pseudo-homophonic pun for "any city" that has been described "as an affluent suburb that looks quaint and respectable but maybe has too many cops for the population size." "Up The Tower", a "fantasy folk song about a craven, money-hungry troll that lived at the top of a golden tower and the heroic townspeople that would eventually dethrone him", was influenced by Charley Pride's cover of "Crystal Chandelier" and contains a reference to The English Mail-Coach by Thomas De Quincey. The song "Male Plague" deals with "weird toxic male attitude" he had witnessed from his experience in the "music iundustry [sic]". "Corpses In Regalia" incorporates dream imagery and is influenced by Our Lady of Darkness by Fritz Leiber. The closing track "Half Sister" is a "swaggering, misanthropic song in which Casey tells three (fictional) tales from different points in history all regarding the idea of 'truth'", ending with the refrain "She's just trying to reach you" which also ends the opening track "A Private Understanding", hence bringing the album "full circle" with the sense that "hope isn't quite dead, but it's also no closer than when we started."

=== Artwork ===
The album cover depicts Maude Fealy.

== Release ==
The album was released on the 29th of September 2017 through Domino Recording Company. The tracks "A Private Understanding", "My Children" and "Don't Go To Anacita" were released as singles on July 10, August 15 and October 27th respectively. The videos for "A Private Understanding" (directed by Tony Wolski and Trevor Naud) and "Don't Go To Anacita" (directed by Yoonha Park) were uploaded through the band's official YouTube channel on the aforementioned dates of their release.

== Reception ==
Professional ratings
Aggregate scores
Source	Rating
AnyDecentMusic?	8.2/10
Metacritic	85/100
Review scores
Source	Rating
AllMusic	4.5/5 stars
The A.V. Club	B+
Chicago Tribune	3.5/4 stars
Financial Times	4/5 stars
The Guardian	5/5 stars
NME	4/5 stars
Pitchfork	6.9/10
Q	4/5 stars
Record Collector	4/5 stars
Uncut	8/10

=== Critical ===
The album, like its predecessors, received critical acclaim from several sources. According to Metacritic, the album has a "metascore" of 85 based on 25 reviews. It also has a score of 8.2 based on 21 reviews on the site AnyDecentMusic?.

In a perfect score review for The Guardian, Ben Beaumont-Thomas called the album "sensational" and praised Casey's "soapbox poetry" lyrics, noting that it "never becomes leaden or pedantic" despite tackling serious issues. "While his band has grown into a post-punk monster," wrote Ben Salmon for Paste, "Casey, too, has moved beyond his personal frets and frustrations and developed into a lyricist capable of clear and compelling commentary. He's a voice worth listening to." In another perfect score review, Danny Carter of Loud and Quiet noted that the cryptic nature of the Joycean lyrics "[help] the album steer clear of being a tacky "fake news" concept piece." The review also praised the "expertly played" music, and the publication would later go on to rank it the best album of the year. Adam-Turner Heffer of Drowned in Sound called it "fairly incredible", and praised "A Private Understanding" as the best song of the year. NME's Thomas Smith called Casey an "elite wordsmith", and wrote - in reference to the song - that the band "have proved that they can be that cereus, blooming in the dark times we inhabit – and continue blossoming into a formidable and vital band."

Tiny Mix Tapes's Sean Hannah, on the other hand, noted that "Casey is at his lyrical best when tackling philosophical questions obliquely rather than head on". Despite this, they praised "Protomartyr's commitment to crafting challenging, academic songs reflective of their harried social and political climate." In a similarly mixed review, Paul Thomson of Pitchfork - while praising the band's ambition - took issue with some of the "scattershot" song structures and the cryptic nature of the lyrics in comparison with the band's past releases: "[B]y inching away from the Detroit-centered world-building of previous Protomartyr records, Casey's sacrificed a certain amount of the thematic consistency that's helped past records hold their center; these songs here, for better and worse, splay out all over the map."

=== Accolades ===
Publication	Accolade	Year	Rank	Ref.
NME	NME's Albums of the Year 2017	2017	#42	
Esquire (Ben Ratliff)	20 Best Albums of 2017	2017	-	
Loud and Quiet	Top 40 Albums of 2017	2017	#1	
OOR	10 Best Albums of 2017	2017	#8	
State	50 Best Albums of 2017	2017	#3	
The Guardian	Best Albums of 2017	2017	#24	
Sound Opinions (Greg Kot)	10 Best Albums of 2017	2017	#6	
Newsweek	17 Best Albums of 2017	2017	#11	
Rolling Stone (Rob Sheffield)	20 Best Albums of 2017	2017	#7	
The Skinny	The Skinny's Top 50 Albums of 2017	2017	#10	
OndaRock	Our 2017 Favorites	2017	#2	

The album would go on to receive other accolades as well:

Publication	Accolade	Year	Rank	Ref.
Paste	The 40 Best Punk Albums of the 2010s	2019	#19	
Magic	150 Records That Made The 2010s	2019	-	
Soundblab	The Best Post-Punk Albums Of The 21st Century	2019	#12	
Getintothis	Getintothis' best 100 albums of the decade	2019	#99	

== Usage in media ==
"My Children" has been used in the seventh episode of The Rain's first season. "Half Sister" was featured in the seventh episode of The OA's second season.

== Track listing ==
No.	Title	Length
1.	"A Private Understanding"	5:18
2.	"Here Is the Thing"	2:50
3.	"My Children"	3:42
4.	"Caitriona"	1:44
5.	"The Chuckler"	3:43
6.	"Windsor Hum"	4:40
7.	"Don't Go to Anacita"	3:12
8.	"Up the Tower"	3:38
9.	"Night-Blooming Cereus"	3:25
10.	"Male Plague"	3:22
11.	"Corpses in Regalia"	2:43
12.	"Half Sister"	5:04
Total length:		43:35

== Personnel ==
Protomartyr

- Joe Casey – vocals
- Greg Ahee – guitars, piano, synth
- Scott Davidson – bass
- Alex Leonard – drums

Additional personnel

- Olivier Demeaux - synth on tracks 1, 3, 4, 8, 9
- Tyler Karmen - violin on tracks 1, 2, 5, 11

== Charts ==
Chart performance for Relatives in Descent
Chart	Position
Dutch Albums (Album Top 100)	144
US Heatseekers Albums (Billboard)	4
US Independent Albums (Billboard)	22
US Vinyl Albums (Billboard)	9
