= Joy as an Act of Resistance =

Studio album by Idles
- Released: 31 August 2018
- Recorded: 2017–2018
- Genres: Punk rock; post-punk; post-hardcore
- Length: 42:14
- Label: Partisan
- Producer: Space

Idles chronology
Brutalism (2017)	Joy as an Act of Resistance (2018)	A Beautiful Thing: Idles Live at le Bataclan (2019)

Singles from Joy as an Act of Resistance
- 1. "Colossus" Released: 29 May 2018; 2. "Danny Nedelko" Released: 4 June 2018; 3. "Samaritans" Released: 25 July 2018; 4. "Great" Released: 14 August 2018; 5. "Never Fight a Man with a Perm" Released: 2 September 2018

Joy as an Act of Resistance is the second studio album by British rock band Idles, released on 31 August 2018 by Partisan Records.

Following the success of their debut album Brutalism, the band started recording new material. Taking inspiration from the similarly titled 2008 poem by Toi Derricotte, Joy as an Act of Resistance tells stories from lead singer Joe Talbot's troubled past. Its lyrics deal with toxic masculinity, self-love, immigration, Brexit, and class.

The album garnered acclaim from critics upon release. Joy as an Act of Resistance peaked at number 5 on the UK Albums Chart and spawned two official singles: "Danny Nedelko" and "Never Fight a Man with a Perm".

To promote the record, the band toured across Japan, North America, and Europe.

== Production and composition ==
The band started recording the album in 2017. Singer Joe Talbot stated "This album is an attempt to be vulnerable to our audience and to encourage vulnerability; a brave naked smile in this shitty new world."

According to Talbot "lots of songs got scrapped because there was this pressure, which we were carrying but not talking about. We were trying to sustain the success of 'Brutalism', to basically remake it. So we kind of scrapped all the songs and talked about why we weren't enjoying writing it."

The album was produced by British record producer and musician, Paul Frazer (known professionally as "SPACE") and mixed by Adam Greenspan and Nick Launay. The album's cover art features a photograph of a fight at a wedding in 1968 that Talbot saw on Instagram. The title phrase is similar to the title of the 2008 poem, "Joy Is An Act of Resistance" (part of a series of poems called "The Telly Cycle") by Pushcart Prize-winning poet Toi Derricotte, whose work as a Black woman explores race and identity.

== Lyrics ==
The album's lyrics deal with toxic masculinity, love, self-love, immigration, Brexit, and class. "June" deals with the death in childbirth of Talbot's daughter Agatha. It also includes a cover version of the Solomon Burke hit "Cry To Me".

Bob Boilen, writing for NPR, sat down with singer Joe Talbot for a track by track analysis of the album where Talbot described why he chose to write about his troubled past, the inseparability of the human portrait and political song, love, the death of his stillborn daughter and what it means to call oneself a parent, toxic masculinity, Brexit, his hate of tabloid journalism and more. Boilen stated that "The stories on Joy as an Act of Resistance are taken from real life: a humane look at immigration through singer Joe Talbot's friend Danny Nedelko; the "importance of grieving parents' right to call themselves mothers and fathers"; the "horrid corners" of Joe Talbot's past all the while celebrating human flaws and professing love with a deep urgency." And that "Joy as an Act of Resistance is a thoughtful attempt at loving one's self while also understanding the importance of community and trust."

== Promotion and release ==
Four of the album's tracks were made available for download prior to its release: "Colossus", "Danny Nedelko" (named after Talbot's friend of the same name and singer with the band Heavy Lungs), "Samaritans", and "Great".

To promote the album, the band announced a world tour taking in Japan, North America, and Europe. The day before the album's release, an art exhibition in London opened, displaying and selling artworks inspired by the album, with the proceeds going to the charity Samaritans. An interview with Talbot aired on ITV News at Ten, discussing the album.

== Commercial performance ==
On 20 December 2019, over 1 year after its release, Joy as an Act of Resistance was certified Silver by the BPI for selling 60,000 copies in the United Kingdom.

== Reception ==
Professional ratings
Aggregate scores
Source	Rating
AnyDecentMusic?	8.5/10
Metacritic	88/100
Review scores
Source	Rating
AllMusic	4.5/5 stars
Chicago Tribune	3.5/4 stars
The Guardian	4/5 stars
The Independent	4/5 stars
Mojo	4/5 stars
NME	5/5 stars
Pitchfork	6.8/10
Q	4/5 stars
The Times	4/5 stars
Vice	A−

Joy as an Act of Resistance was met with widespread critical acclaim. Jordan Bassett, reviewing the album for NME, awarded the album five stars, calling it "an instant classic". Dave Simpson, for The Guardian gave it four stars, describing it as "11 songs of focused, cathartic rage, rooted in their own experiences", and calling Idles "Britain’s most necessary band". Mark Beaumont of The Independent also gave it four stars. Dom Gourlay, for Drowned in Sound, called it "one of 2018's most eagerly anticipated releases", awarding it a score of 9 out of 10, and going on to say that it is "everything anyone could have wanted or expected it to be: Idles have released the most relevant and at times gut wrenching album of the year." Classic Rock magazine gave it the same score, calling it "a heart-breaking but jubilant exploration of joy, honesty, fragility and expression as our most powerful means of human resistance".

Ged Babey, writing for Louder Than War called it "One of the most inspiring albums I have heard for a long, long time. Punk Rock reinvented and not wearing a mask of masculinity or yoke of tradition, but a wicked smile and its broken heart exposed but still beating in its chest. Punk rock which instead of calling for Anarchy and saying I Don’t Care is shouting UNITY! and LOVE IS ALL." Jake Kennedy, for Record Collector, gave it four stars, calling it "an album that manages to combine grief, self-loathing and a realisation that life’s better played honest, with a fine-tuned, brutal sound: something like bent sheet metal being hammered straight." Ava Muir from Exclaim! applauded the album, saying, "IDLES turn trauma and anger into affirming lessons on Joy As an Act of Resistance, crafting a cathartic masterpiece that wears its heart — broken, but still beating — on its sleeve." Ryan Drever, for The Skinny, gave it three stars, stating that "many of these songs raise some serious hell", but viewed the tracks as too similar. PopMatters' Paul Carr gave it 9/10, commenting on what he saw as "a profound sense of joy on the album".

In the review for AllMusic, Liam Martin concluded that "Overall, Joy as an Act of Resistance manages to plumb new depths for Idles — that they've achieved another record in such a short space of time is admirable, let alone one that shines head and shoulders over the majority of their peers — and it certainly upholds their status as one of the U.K.'s most exciting new acts."

=== Accolades ===
Publication	Accolade	Rank	Ref.
BBC Radio 6 Music	Top 10 Albums of 2018	1	
Clash	Albums Of The Year 2018	10	
Classic Rock	50 Best Albums Of 2018	10	
Crack Magazine	The Top 50 Albums of 2018	5	
The Daily Beast	Top 10 Albums of 2018	7	
Double J	The 50 Best Albums of 2018	4	
Drowned in Sound	15 Favourite Albums of 2018	2	
Fopp	Top 100 Albums of 2018	2	
Gigwise	51 Best Albums of 2018	9	
The Guardian	The 50 Best Albums of 2018	6	
Kerrang!	Top 50 Albums of 2018	9	
The Line of Best Fit	The Best Albums of 2018	3	
Loud and Quiet	Best 40 albums of 2018	9	
Mojo	Top 75 Albums of 2018	6	
musicOMH	Top 50 Albums Of 2018	7	
NME	Albums Of The Year 2018	3	
Paste	Top 50 Albums of 2018	25	
Paste	100 Best Albums of the 2010s	76	
Piccadilly Records	Top 100 Albums of 2018	25	
PopMatters	The 70 Best Albums of 2018	3	
Q	Top 50 Albums of 2018	7	
Rolling Stone	20 Best Metal Albums of 2018	15	
Rough Trade	Top 100 Albums of 2018	3	
The Skinny	Top 10 Albums of 2018	4	
Sputnikmusic	Top 50 Albums of 2018	28	
Uncut	Top 50 Albums of 2018	27	
Under the Radar	Top 100 Albums of 2018	20	

== Track listing ==
All tracks are written by Adam Devonshire, Jonathan Beavis, Joseph Talbot, Lee Kiernan, and Mark Bowen except track 11, written by Bert Russell.

No.	Title	Length
1.	"Colossus"	5:39
2.	"Never Fight a Man with a Perm"	3:48
3.	"I'm Scum"	3:09
4.	"Danny Nedelko"	3:24
5.	"Love Song"	3:05
6.	"June"	3:35
7.	"Samaritans"	3:30
8.	"Television"	3:12
9.	"Great"	2:44
10.	"Gram Rock"	2:29
11.	"Cry to Me" (Solomon Burke cover)	2:14
12.	"Rottweiler"	5:25
Total length:		42:14

=== Notes ===
- "Never Fight a Man with a Perm" incorporates an interpolation of "These Boots Are Made for Walkin'", written by Lee Hazlewood and originally performed by American singer, Nancy Sinatra.

== Personnel ==
Idles

- Joe Talbot – lead vocals
- Mark Bowen – guitar
- Lee Kiernan – guitar
- Adam Devonshire – bass
- Jon Beavis – drums

Production

- Space – producer
- Nick Launay – mixing
- Adam 'Atom' Greenspan – mixing

== Charts ==
Chart (2018)	Peak position
Australia (ARIA Hitseekers)	11
Belgian Albums (Ultratop Flanders)	20
Belgian Albums (Ultratop Wallonia)	81
French Albums (SNEP)	74
German Albums (Offizielle Top 100)	49
Irish Albums (IRMA)	56
Scottish Albums (Official Charts)	6
Swiss Albums (Schweizer Hitparade)	49
UK Albums (Official Charts)	5
US Heatseekers Albums (Billboard)	4
US Independent Albums (Billboard)	26

== Certifications ==
Certifications and sales for Joy as an Act of Resistance
Region	Certification	Certified units/sales
United Kingdom (BPI)	Gold	100,000^{‡}
^{‡} Sales+streaming figures based on certification alone.
