= Never Fight a Man with a Perm =

Single by Idles

from the album Joy as an Act of Resistance
- Released: 2 September 2018
- Recorded: August–October 2017
- Genre: Punk rock; post-hardcore; noise rock
- Length: 3:48
- Label: Partisan
- Songwriter(s): Idles

Idles singles chronology
"Great" (2018)	"Never Fight a Man with a Perm" (2018)	"Mercedes Marxist" (2019)

Alternative cover
- The music video single cover.

"Never Fight a Man with a Perm" is a song by British rock band Idles. It is the fifth single from their second album, Joy as an Act of Resistance. The track was released as a single for streaming on 2 September 2018 through the band's YouTube channel.

Lyrically, the song has been described as a critique of toxic masculinity and a rallying cry for men to address the dangers of toxic masculinity and what it really means to be a man. Joe Talbot, the lead singer of the band, has described the song as a critique of masculinity, as well as a personal exposure to his past behaviour when he was younger and involved in fights and such scenes.

== Background ==
In 2018, Talbot explained his creative inspiration for the song to NPR: ”This song came about when I said the album needed a knife to cut through the macabre timbre of the album's arch; as soon as I mentioned "knife," Bobo [guitarist Mark Bowen] shat the riff out like he knew the album wanted it also. I wanted the song to be an exploration of the horrid corners of my past; the bit I felt shame from. I think of my art as a way of being vulnerable, an exercise in catharsis, and a reflection of my ugliness that can exalt shame. Here it manifested into something beautiful, as all catharsis should be.

== Themes and composition ==
In an interview with Kerrang!, lead singer Joe Talbot discussed how the song focuses on his personal mental health and toxic masculinity. Specifically, Talbot exposes how the song is a portal to his dark past where the toxic masculine culture he criticizes was a culture he was immersed in earlier on his life, and how he is trying to rid himself of that behavior while acknowledging it happening.

Writing for the Leamington Courier Peter Omerod compared the song's sound and composition "positioned somewhere between Quentin Crisp, Morrissey and the toilet door of a Wetherspoon's". Omerod stated that this song, and the band in general is "quite rightly reluctant to be filed under any particular genre: the drums often have a post-punk or motorik intensity; the bass is full, fat and sometimes even funky; the guitars bite and churn; the vocals snarl warmly."

== Reception ==
Reception for the song has been widely positive by contemporary music critics and journalists. Ludovic Hunter-Tilney, writing for The Financial Times praised the song as the "right kind of noise". Hunter-Tilney described the song as a satire of violence through the critique of masculinity, while describing the violent sounding noise in the track. He described the song as a "musical maelstrom aimed to shake up norms, but in the cause of self-growth rather than exhausted rock-and-roll rebellion".

Olivia White, writing for The Mancunion called the track a "fan favourite", and described the track as having "relentless vitality". Thomas Gale, writing for The Oxford Times praised the "cathartic noise" of the track's introduction before launching into the recognisable, raucous punk they're known for.

Omerod also felt the song, especially the song as "bright and devastatingly direct. And the lyrics carry a barbed and brutal beauty." Omerod further felt the band's song is "potent, powerful, and enormous fun". Omerod further said "at this point in their career, Idles are so perfect that you might almost want them to retire now. Only that would deny us the possibility of their taking over the world and making everything right. This explosive mix of fierceness, conviction and wit means they can go places others may dare not."

== Popular culture ==
The song is played on the last episode of season 5 of the TV show Peaky Blinders. The second verse plays as Oswald Mosley enters a rally at Bingley Hall in Birmingham. It also plays during the fourth episode of season 1 of the Netflix drama series Biohackers.

== Music video ==
A music video for the song was released on 15 July 2019. The animated music video is in the style of a classic arcade video game where the player selects Joe Talbot to play against "Barry Biffa", which is British slang for a person obsessed with sports (a jock or bro in United States culture), fighting against each other. In the first game, the Talbot character defeats Biffa, and plays against "Timmy Thyroid" (mocking meatheads), ultimately, the two characters begin making out with each other, get electrocuted and go to heaven. The music video was directed by Al Brown. The illustration was by Russell Taysom, and the Director of Photography and Animation was led by Stella Belle Hex.

== Personnel ==
- Joe Talbot – vocals
- Adam Devonshire – bass
- Mark Bowen – guitar
- Lee Kiernan – guitar
- Jon Beavis – drums
