= Joe Casey (singer) =

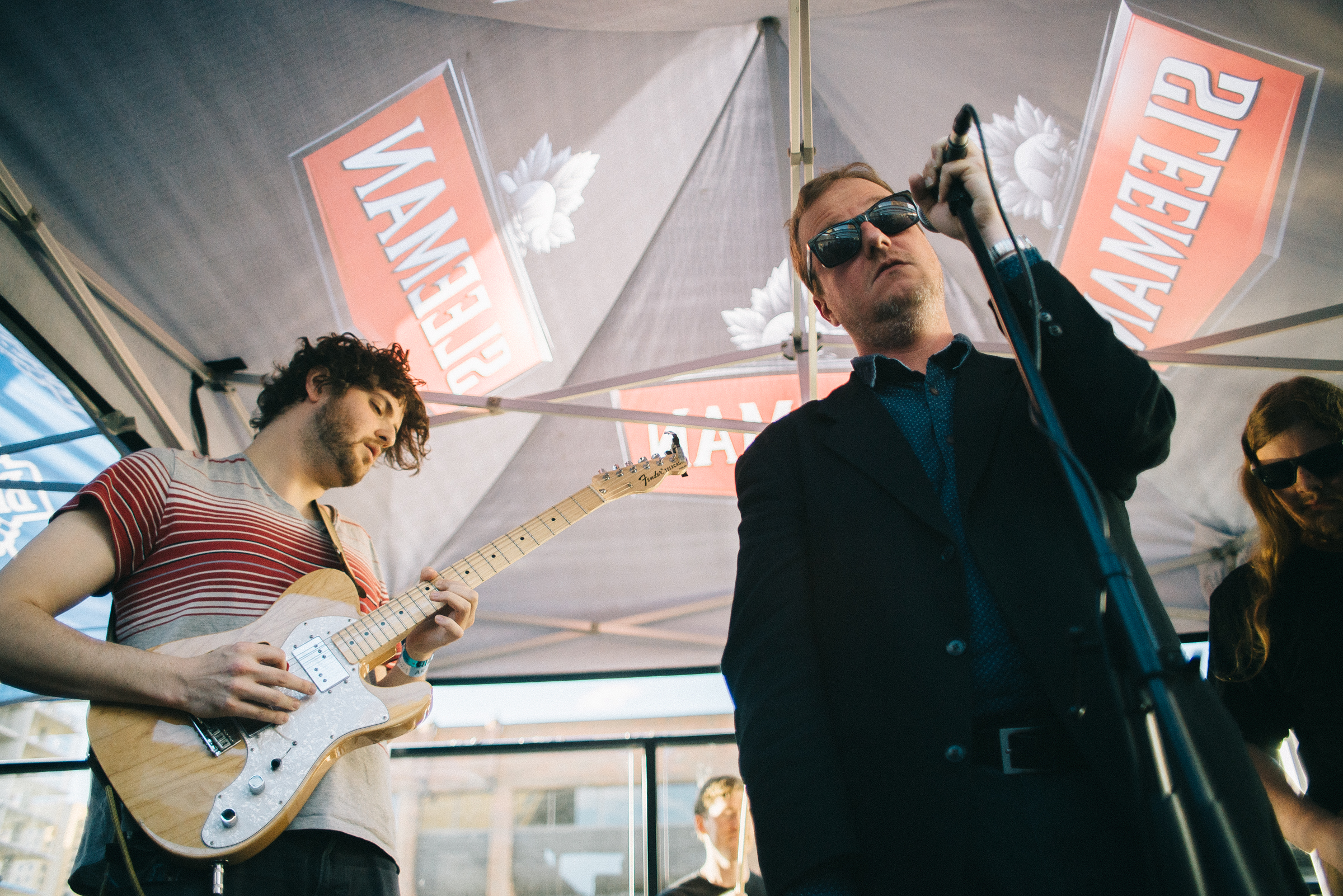
- Casey performing live with Protomartyr in 2016

Background information
- Born: January 31, 1977 (age 49); Detroit, Michigan
- Origin: University of Michigan
- Genres: Post-punk; art punk; noise rock; indie rock
- Years active: 2010-present
- Member of: Protomartyr
- Website: These Hungry Times

Joseph Kevin Barry Casey (born January 31, 1977) is an American musician based out of Detroit, best known as the lead vocalist and lyricist of post-punk band Protomartyr. He is known for his distinctive vocal style, "anti-charisma[tic]" stage presence, and sardonic, literary lyrics which often incorporate philosophical themes. He is also responsible for creating the band's visual aesthetic.

== Early life ==
Casey was born to an Irish-American Catholic family and is the youngest of 3 children. He grew up on 6 Mile on the north-west side of Detroit, which he remembers as an "idyllic corner" of the city when he was a child; his house described as being "the last [...] on a dead-end street, surrounded by a school, a church, and a monastery." However, by the time he was a teenager, his street had become prone to frequent shootings and stabbings, including one on his next door neighbor's lawn when he was just 12. His father - a construction inspector for the Detroit Water and Sewerage Department - was a fan of history, which in turn encouraged his interest in the field later on. Solitary in nature and fond of playing video games, he remembers being an avid reader as a child, treating it as "a competition [...] to see who [among his siblings] could read the most".

He attended the University of Detroit Jesuit High School and Academy and remembers being a good student, though he describes his academic performance in college - University of Michigan - as being "pretty bad". He recalls trying to learn the flute in grade school, calling the attempt a "failure on [his] part." His school friends included many future musicians, including the members of garage punk band Tyvek (whom he would accompany on a few of their tours and cite as an influence on Protomartyr's music). However, while many of them left for places like New York City, Los Angeles or Chicago, Casey himself chose to stay in Detroit and worked a number of odd-end jobs after film school, a period during which "he drank, [and] got depressed." One of them included the job of a doorman at the Gem Theatre, where he met and became close to guitarist Greg Ahee - then playing in a "caustic punk" band named Butt Babies with bassist Scott Davidson and drummer Alex Leonard (grandson of Elmore Leonard).

In March 2008, while on a trip to Texas with Tyvek, his 72-year-old father died due to complications during a routine hernia surgery. His death acted as a "wake-up call" to Casey, and would subsequently have a huge impact on his lyricism. He and Butt Babies started to jam together in 2010, soon adopting the name "Protomartyr" - referencing Saint Stephen. Kevin Boyer of Tyvek briefly played bass and later second guitar for the band during their early days, before having to leave due to a heavy work schedule. With the brief exception of Kelley Deal joining the band as a touring member in 2020, the band have primarily remained a quartet ever since.

== Career ==
Since 2010 and up until today, Protomartyr have released more than 6 studio albums and 3 EPs worth of material, and all of their songs have featured Joe Casey on vocals. He is also solely responsible for the band's lyricism across the entirety of their studio output - the only exception being a cover of Preoccupations' "Forbidden" (released on a split single, with Preoccupations' cover of the track "Pontiac 87" as the B-side).

Aside from their 2012 debut No Passion All Technique - which was later reissued in 2019 to positive reviews - all of Protomartyr's albums, including 2018's Consolation EP, have received widespread critical acclaim. On review aggregator website Metacritic, the band's discography (excluding their debut and including the Consolation EP) has an average score of 83/100, indicating "[u]niversal [a]cclaim". The Agent Intellect and Relatives in Descent even managed to break the top 5 of Billboard's Top Heatseekers chart, and songs from these two albums have been featured in TV shows such as 13 Reasons Why, The Rain and The OA. They have extensively toured around the world and have performed at multiple noteworthy festivals such as SXSW, CMJ Music Marathon, and the Pitchfork Music Festival.

Casey has also performed as a guest on numerous other records. He provides backing vocals on Tyvek's 2012 album On Triple Beams (alongside Greg Ahee). He sings lead vocals on the tracks "Rope" and "Slang Words" by The Gotobeds off of their 2016 & 2019 albums Blood Sugar Secs Traffic and Debt Begins At 30 respectively. He is also credited as the composer of the track "Why'd You?" off of the former album.

== Artistry ==
=== Lyricism and themes ===
"With his suit jacket and dangling cigarette, Casey remains much like the guy down the street who only speaks up when he's had a couple at the bar. With Protomartyr, he often sounds like he just wandered into the room and began riffing on whatever's on his mind while the band ebbs and surges around him. Yet this seemingly stream of consciousness spew is often strikingly sharp and evocative. When Casey latches on to a simple phrase or sentence, it's hard medicine: "I don't want to hear those vile trumpets anymore"; "everything's fine"; "knock it down.""

— Greg Kot, Chicago Tribune

According to an interview with Los Angeles Review of Books, Casey writes lyrics after listening to the music composed by the rest of the band. He spoke of his writing process in a Reddit AMA:

It changes from song to song. I will say I tend to go the "stream of consciousness" route at first BUT then heavily edit, add context, and then heavily edit again. Editing is the key.

Casey has been called the group's "wild card" due to his lyrics, described as "free-associative" and "blue collar" "beat poetry". His lyrics often consist of references to pre-Enlightenment sources such as Greek philosophy & mythology. For example, the lyrics to "A Private Understanding" reference Heraclitus, while "Bridge & Crown" references the deity Hermes. The philosophical concept of existentialism also informs a lot of his writing. He has often cited Irish literature as a big influence on his lyrics, a Spin interview noting that he'd "daydream" in college of being to Detroit what James Joyce was to Dublin. He has cited Cré na Cille by Máirtín Ó Cadhain as an inspiration for the track "Caitriona", and has mentioned Flann O'Brian's writings as coming "closest to a style [he] poorly [tries to] emulate from time to time." He references the insights of recurring O'Brian character, De Selby, in "A Private Understanding", particularly through lines such as "the night is an accumulation of dark air."

According to Ben Ratliff - who considers The Agent Intellect to contain "[s]ome of the strongest lyrics of 2015" - Casey's lyrics often render "Detroit as a pile of symbols and emotions". "Casey writes lyrics about the lives of the working class and dystopian visions from the heartland", writes Lauretta Charlton for The New Yorker, noting - as have other sources, including Casey himself - the influence Detroit has had on his lyrics. His lyrics on Relatives in Descent have been labeled by many as political, despite Casey refusing to label it an "anti-Trump" album, finding it no less political than the band's previous releases up until that point. Ana da Silva of The Raincoats compares his apocalyptic lyricism on Ultimate Success Today - with its "theme of things ending, above all human existence" - to Cormac McCarthy's The Road. Alexis Petridis finds Casey's "pre-cognitive powers" in his lyricism on the album to be similar to those of Mark E. Smith, one of many critics/sources to find similarities between the two as well.

=== Vocal style and live performances ===
Casey has been described as having a baritone and a "half spoken, half sung" sprechsang vocal style, which he pejoratively describes as "mumbling". It has been compared to Ian Curtis, Nick Cave and Mark E. Smith.

Casey has often been singled out in reviews of Protomartyr's live performances. In fact, humorous critical descriptions of his introverted appearance and "anti-charisma[tic]" onstage persona have even been compiled on a widely referenced Tumblr blog titled DESCRIPTIONS OF JOE CASEY. “Joe is one of the best lead singers right now,” Parquet Courts’ Andrew Savage claimed in an interview with Spin, “His whole stage thing is awesome, but it’s not even a ‘thing’—it's just who he is.”

Casey suffers from stage fright, and claims that on-stage drinking - a common feature of his live performances, where he brings "at least 6 beers" - helps him deal with it.

=== Artwork ===
Cover artwork designed by Casey (featuring a drawing by Alex Leonard) for the Protomartyr split single with R. Ring, A Half of Seven (2015).

Casey is responsible for the entirety of Protomartyr's album and flyer artwork, and consciously chooses to leave them uncredited. He describes his process and the origins of his aesthetic as follows:

Well, the printing process is me going to FedEx Kinko's and fudging around with the copiers there. Just tape and scissors and a rudimentary understanding of how the xeroxs work. I stumbled into "my aesthetic" that way. And being rushed and reusing a previous show flyer for the first two albums cemented the strong, simple portrait as my cover manifesto.

He also listed his influences as follows:

I grew up with a bunch of Frederic Remington books which affected me deeply. I like Albrecht Dürer, of course. Old punk flyers. Lucian Freud and Francis Bacon. Caravaggio. Jacques-Louis David, Théodore Géricault, etc. etc.

All of his artwork is displayed on his blog titled These Hungry Times.

== Personal life ==
Casey lives on 9 Mile Road in suburban Detroit, where he moved in 2022 after a spate of break-ins "to which Detroit police responded with complete indifference" prompted him to leave the home where he grew up. He had lived there with his mother until he and his brothers decided to relocate her to the suburbs due to her worsening Alzheimer's disease in 2014. Her affliction was the inspiration behind the lyrics to the song "Why Does It Shake?". Casey's mother died in 2021.

Casey got engaged to his girlfriend, Brittany, in 2022, and the two of them married in Detroit on May 20, 2023. They have a daughter together, born in early 2025.

Casey is a "movie lover", and his favorite games include NFL Blitz and Red Dead Redemption 2. He is a life-long fan of the Detroit Tigers.
