= Tyvek (band) =

American rock band

- Origin: Detroit, Michigan, U.S.
- Genres: Punk rock; garage punk; lo-fi
- Years active: 2004–present
- Labels: Siltbreeze; In the Red; Ginkgo
- Members: Kevin Boyer; Shelley Salant; Fred Thomas; Alex Glendening; Emily Roll
- Past members: Larry Williams; Bobby Columbo; Matt Ziolkowski; Heath Moerland; Damon Sturdivant

Tyvek is an American rock band formed in Detroit, Michigan in 2004.

== History ==
Tyvek was founded by songwriter/vocalist/multi-instrumentalist Kevin Boyer in 2004. After releasing several 7" singles for the labels X, What's Your Rupture?, M'Lady's Records, S-S, and Sub Pop, the band issued their self-titled debut album through Siltbreeze in 2009. In 2010, Tyvek released the demo LP Skyin, and their first album for In the Red, Nothing Fits. 2011 saw the release of their next album, Fast Metabolism. The band followed up with On Triple Beams in 2012. After several limited cassettes on Boyer's Doubles Tapes label, Tyvek returned to In the Red in 2016 with the album, Origin of What.

By 2017, the band settled into a regular lineup consisting of Boyer, guitarist Shelley Salant, drummer Fred Thomas, and bassist Alex Glendening. Salant's Ginkgo Records released the band's next studio album, Overground, in 2023.

== Band members ==
Current members

- Kevin Boyer – vocals, guitar
- Shelley Salant – guitar
- Fred Thomas – drums
- Alex Glendening – bass
- Emily Roll – saxophone

Former members

- Larry Williams - bass
- Bobby Columbo - bass
- Matt Ziolkowski – drums
- Heath Moerland – guitar
- Damon Sturdivant – guitar

== Discography ==
=== Studio albums ===
- Tyvek (2009, Siltbreeze)
- Skyin (2010, Exbxtapes)
- Nothing Fits (2010, In the Red)
- Fast Metabolism (2011, M'lady's Records/Water Wing Records)
- On Triple Beams (2012, In the Red)
- Origin of What (2016, In the Red)
- Overground (2023, Ginkgo)
