= Into the Great Wide Yonder =

Studio album by Trentemøller
- Released: May 28, 2010
- Genre: Electronica, downtempo, ambient
- Label: In My Room
- Producer: Anders Trentemøller

Trentemøller chronology
The Trentemøller Chronicles (2007)	Into the Great Wide Yonder (2010)	Lost (2013)

Singles from Into the Great Wide Yonder
- 1. "Sycamore Feeling" Released: March 22, 2010; 2. "...Even Though You're With Another Girl" Released: September 6, 2010; 3. "Silver Surfer, Ghost Rider Go!!!" Released: November 19, 2010; 4. "Shades of Marble" Released: April 1, 2011

Alternative cover
- Special Edition

Into the Great Wide Yonder is the second studio album by Danish electronic musician Trentemøller. It was released physically on May 28, 2010, in Germany, and worldwide on May 31 as digital download. The album's lead single, "Sycamore Feeling," which features vocals by Danish singer Marie Fisker, was released digitally on March 22, 2010. The Special Edition includes a DVD with the music video of "Sycamore Feeling" and a live video of "Silver Surfer, Ghost Rider Go!!!" performed at Roskilde Festival in 2009, both recorded in high-definition.

The album peaked at number two on the Danish Albums Chart. In 2014 it was awarded a double silver certification from the Independent Music Companies Association, which indicated sales of at least 40,000 copies throughout Europe.

== Track listing ==
All songs written by Anders Trentemøller, except where otherwise noted.

No.	Title	Length
1.	"The Mash and the Fury"	7:00
2.	"Sycamore Feeling" (Trentemøller, Marie Fisker)	6:06
3.	"Past the Beginning of the End"	6:19
4.	"Shades of Marble"	5:53
5.	"...Even Though You're With Another Girl" (Trentemøller, Josephine Philip)	4:52
6.	"Häxan"	5:11
7.	"Metamorphis"	2:05
8.	"Silver Surfer, Ghost Rider Go!!!"	4:23
9.	"Neverglade" (Trentemøller, Fyfe Dangerfield)	4:33
10.	"Tide" (Trentemøller, Solveig Sandnes)	7:45

Special Edition DVD
No.	Title	Length
1.	"Sycamore Feeling" (Video)	5:32
2.	"Silver Surfer, Ghost Rider Go!!!" (Live at Roskilde - Video)	4:38

iTunes Store Special Edition
No.	Title	Length
11.	"Neverglade" (Trentemøller remix)	7:45
12.	"Sycamore Feeling" (Marie Fisker version)	4:25
13.	"...Even Though You're with Another Girl" (Mikael Simpson version)	3:43
14.	"Neverglade" (UNKLE Surrender Sounds Session #16)	5:49
15.	"Sycamore Feeling" (Mofus remix)	6:30
16.	"...Even Though You're with Another Girl" (Dan the Dø remix)	3:31
17.	"Tide" (Efterklang remix)	4:51
18.	"Silver Surfer, Ghost Rider Go !!!" (Andrew Weatherall Sky 81 mix)	5:59
19.	"Tide" (Modeselektors Last Remix Ever)	4:39
20.	"...Even Though You're with Another Girl" (Pantha Du Prince Dub version)	8:58
21.	"Silver Surfer, Ghost Rider Go!!!" (Lulu Rouge feat. Abdullah S remix)	4:50
22.	"...Even Though You're with Another Girl" (Kollektiv Turmstrasse remix)
221.	Untitled	8:04

== Personnel ==
- Anders Trentemøller – composer, producer, mixing and instruments
- Anders Schumann – mastering and additional mixing
- Davide Rossi – strings ("The Mash and the Fury" and "Shades of Marble")
- Mikael Simpson – acoustic guitar and bass ("Past the Beginning of the End"), bass ("Silver Surfer, Ghost Rider Go!!!" and "Tide")
- Dorit Chrysler – theremin ("Past the Beginning of the End")
- Jakob Høyer – acoustic guitar ("Sycamore Feeling")
- Sune Martin – bass mandolin ("Neverglade")
- Nanna Øland Fabricius – choir ("Past the Beginning of the End")
- Marie Fisker – vocals and lyrics ("Sycamore Feeling")
- Josephine Philip – vocals and lyrics ("...Even Though You're With Another Girl")
- Fyfe Dangerfield – vocals and lyrics ("Neverglade")
- Solveig Sandnes – vocals and lyrics ("Tide")

== Charts ==
Chart (2010)	Peak position
Belgium Albums Chart (Flanders)	27
Belgium Albums Chart (Wallonia)	79
Danish Albums Chart	2
Dutch Albums Chart	86
French Albums Chart	142
German Albums Chart	37
Swiss Albums Charts	41

== Release history ==
Region	Date	Label	Format
Worldwide	May 31, 2010	In My Room	Digital download
Germany	May 28, 2010	In My Room	CD
Denmark	May 31, 2010	In My Room	CD
France	June 2, 2010	In My Room	CD
United States	June 8, 2010	In My Room	CD
Canada	June 8, 2010	In My Room	CD
Worldwide	April 22, 2013	In My Room	Digital download (Special Edition)
