= Andreas Emenius =

Swedish multi-disciplinary artist

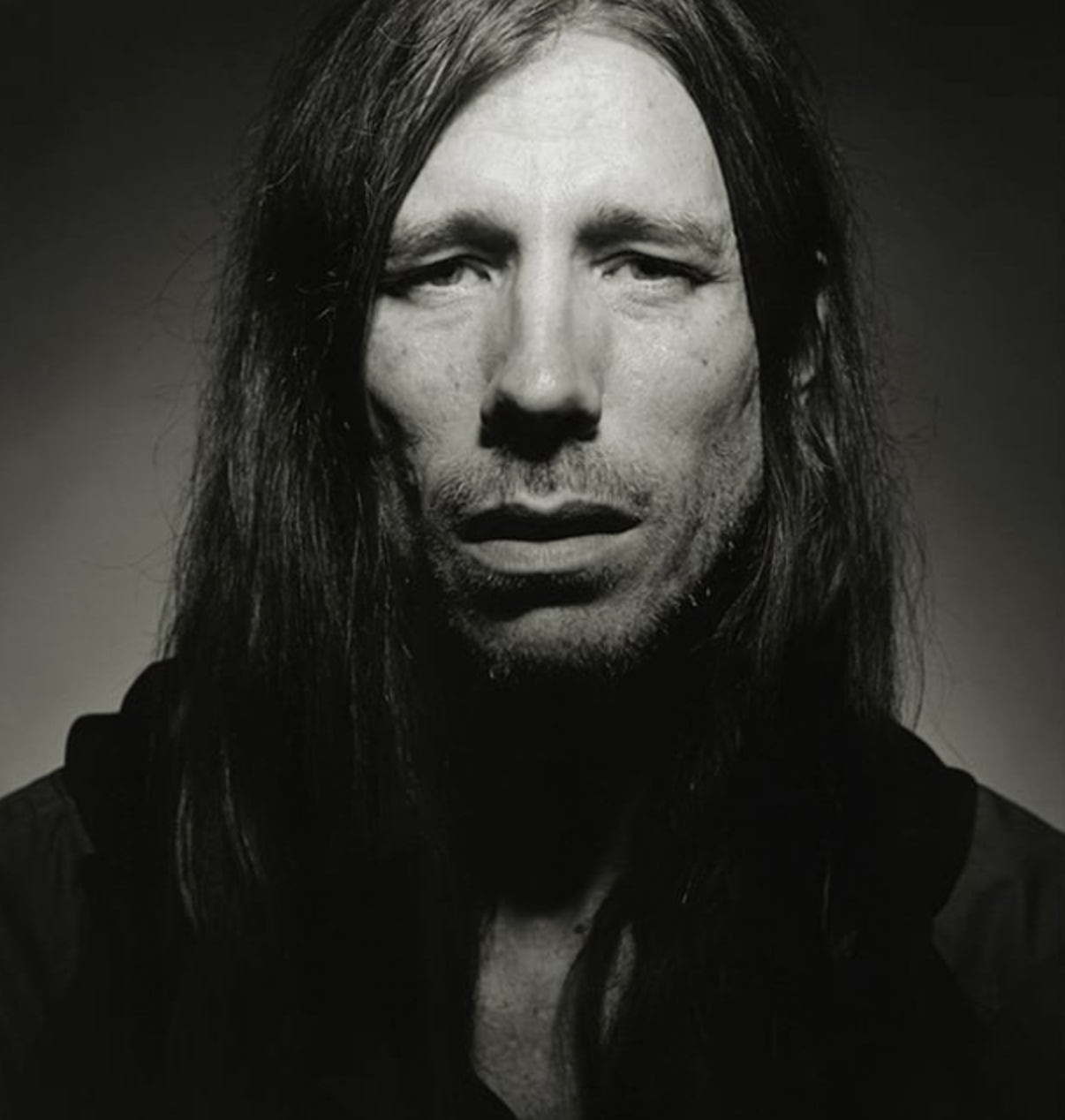
- Emenius in 2020
- Born: February 24, 1973 (age 53); Stockholm, Sweden
- Education: Central Saint Martins
- Known for: Painter & Performance Artist
- Spouse: Elena Velez
- Children: 2
- Website: www.andreasemenius.com

Andreas Emenius (born February 24, 1973) is a Swedish cross-disciplinary artist known for installation, painting, and performance, based in Copenhagen. Emenius has shown work in multiple global biennales as well as museums, and is currently the curator and co founder of the Nordic Contemporary, a gallery for contemporary art featuring Scandinavian artists, in Paris, France. Emenius works additionally as a film director and is a contributor for SHOWstudio, a fashion and film platform founded by British photographer Nick Knight. Emenius teaches occasionally as a visual arts professor at The Royal Danish Academy of Fine Arts, and is currently represented by Shin Gallery In New York. Emenius is the husband of prominent New York fashion designer Elena Velez with whom he shares two children.

== Career ==
Upon graduation from Central Saint Martins in 1999 with a degree in graphic design, Emenius moved to Paris and worked in design for Kenzo, Adidas, Nike Nederland, and collaborated with British graphic designer Neville Brody. Emenius works primarily with painting, video, and sculpture and uses different mediums to express themes including portraiture, banality, anthropomorphism, kinetics, high & low culture, and the ritualistic behaviors of man in group. UK based publication 1 Granary speaks to his work as "an exploration of figuration and abstraction" in videos, paintings, sculptures and performances. Inspired by the gesamtkunstwerk school of aesthetic, his work centers on the blending of individual components to create a whole, described by Xibit Magazine as "outlandish" and "eclectic". In 2018-2019, Emenius exhibited solo shows at Nikolaij Kunsthal, Art Busan, and Shin Gallery New York. Emenius has directed film for musicians Trentemøller and August Rosenbaum. Emenius, alongside designer Henrik Vibskov, co-created the acclaimed Vibskov & Emenius art ventures, The Fringe Projects, and The Circular Series, described by Dazed Magazine as a series of projects that go outside of the realm of fashion, touching on a variety of aspects such as performance, art installation, film, and even tapestry. Coverage of Emenius's work has been found in Phillips Auction House, Galerie Magazine, The New York Times, Christies, ArtForum, Vogue Italia, Purple Magazine, Nowness, The Fader, Hypebeast, and The Korea Times.

In 2014 Emenius co-founded the Nordic Contemporary gallery in Republique, Paris, as a platform to create long-term visibility for Nordic art, showcasing internationally the Nordic region's increasing importance in the global art scene.

== Works ==
Biennale

- 2011 Design Not Design (co-directed Seung H-Sang & Ai Weiwei), Gwangju Biennale, S. Korea
- 2010 Beyond the Crisis, Curitiba Biennale, Brazil

Solo exhibitions

- 2024 Näste, Shin Gallery, New York, USA
- 2022 ATLAS PARADISE, Shin Gallery, New York, USA
- 2021 Solo private selling exhibition, Phillips Auction House, New York, USA
- 2020 The Bored and the Restless, Shin Gallery, New York, USA
- 2019 When the Unknown Becomes Familiar, Kunsthallen Nikolaj, Copenhagen, Denmark
- 2019 The Great Conversation, Suwon Cultural Foundation, South Korea
- 2018 Muscle Memory, Shin Gallery, New York, U.S.A
- 2017 Sticky minds, fluid moves, Viborg Kunsthal, Denmark
- 2013 New End New End, Schunck Museum, Herleen, The Netherlands
- 2012 Future heads, Jonas Kleerup Gallery Stockholm, Sweden
- 2011 Pull me apart, tear me back together, WAS Wonderland Art Space, Copenhagen, Denmark
- 2010 The Circular Series, Wilhelm Wagenfeld Museum, Bremen, Germany

Performance & video

- 2017 Coming back from the gas station, everything melts through me, Copenhagen Artweek
- 2015-2017 Assorted Music videos for Trentemøller; 'Redefine', 'River In Me', 'My Conviction', 'Come Undone'
- 2014 Through & Through, Reaktorhallen, with Jacob Mühlrad Stockholm, Zittern Pferd, installation, H.C Andersen Castle, Copenhagen
