= The Trentemøller Chronicles =

Compilation album by Trentemøller
- Released: October 1, 2007
- Genre: Electronica; Downtempo; Minimal
- Length: 75:15 (Disc 1); 78:38 (Disc 2)
- Label: Audiomatique Recordings

Trentemøller chronology
The Last Resort (2006)	The Trentemøller Chronicles (2007)	Into the Great Wide Yonder (2010)

Professional ratings
Review scores
Source	Rating
Allmusic	4/5 stars
Pitchfork Media	(5.9/10)
NME	(7/10)

The Trentemøller Chronicles is a compilation album by Danish electronic musician Trentemøller, released on October 1, 2007. The first disc acts as a mix session, mixed by Trentemøller and the second disc contains selected Trentemøller remixes in their full length. The double album is also available on vinyl and as digital download.

The liner notes read:

The unique double album is Trentemøller's very own personal selection of his finest songs and remixes from 2003 - 2007. Featuring new and rare material, much of which has only been available on vinyl or compilations until now, as well as special re-edits, CD1 itself is an exclusive Trentemøller mix session.

The Trentemøller Chronicles peaked at #13 on the Danish Albums Chart.

== Track listing ==
=== Standard edition ===
Disc 1
No.	Title	Artist	Length
1.	"The Forest"	Trentemøller	5:59
2.	"Klodsmajor"	Trentemøller	3:10
3.	"McKlaren" (Trentemøller Remix)	Klovn	5:18
4.	"Snowflake" (Live Version)	Trentemøller	7:45
5.	"Blood in the Streets"	Trentemøller	6:26
6.	"Moan" (Trentemøller Remix)	Trentemøller	8:15
7.	"Kink"	Trentemøller	5:58
8.	"Gush"	Trentemøller	5:26
9.	"Physical Fraction"	Trentemøller	5:48
10.	"Killer Kat"	Trentemøller	5:28
11.	"Rykketid"	Trentemøller	4:38
12.	"Always Something Better" (Trentemøller Remix)	Trentemøller	7:51
13.	"Moan" (Trentemøller Remix Radio Edit) (bonus track)	Trentemøller	3:32
Total length:			75:15

Disc 2
No.	Title	Artist	Length
1.	"What Else Is There?" (Trentemøller Remix)	Röyksopp	7:41
2.	"Coincidance" (Trentemøller Remix)	Mathias Schaffhäuser	7:22
3.	"Danger Global Warming" (Trentemøller Remix)	The Blacksmoke Organisation	6:05
4.	"We Share Our Mothers' Health" (Trentemøller Remix)	The Knife	7:29
5.	"You And I" (Trentemøller Free Dub Remix)	Filur	9:06
6.	"Feeling Good" (Trentemøller Remix - Chronicles Edit)	Jokke Ilsøe	6:19
7.	"Konichiwa Bitches" (Trentemøller Remix)	Robyn	6:25
8.	"Want 2 / Need 2" (Trentemøller Remix)	Sharon Phillips	6:02
9.	"Flamingo" (Trentemøller Remix)	Tomboy	9:05
10.	"Go" (Trentemøller Remix)	Moby	6:46
11.	"Les Djinns" (Trentemøller Remix)	Djuma Soundsystem	6:15
Total length:			78:38

=== Digital download version ===
1. "The Forest" - 5:45
2. "Klodsmajor" - 3:13
3. Klovn - "McKlaren (Trentemøller Remix)" - 5:18
4. "Snowflake (Live Version)" - 7:49
5. "Blood in the Streets" - 6:31
6. "Moan (Trentemøller Remix)" - 7:25 (featuring Ane Trolle)
7. "Kink" - 6:49
8. "Gush" - 5:59
9. "Physical Fraction" - 7:05
10. "Killer Kat" - 7:07
11. "Rykketid" - 5:13
12. "Always Something Better (Trentemøller Remix)" - 7:57
1. Mathias Schaffhäuser - Coincidance (Trentemøller Remix)" - 7:22
2. The Knife - "We Share Our Mothers' Health (Trentemøller Remix)" - 7:29
3. Filur - "You And I (Trentemøller Free Dub Remix)" - 9:06
4. Jokke Ilsøe - "Feeling Good (Trentemøller Remix - Chronicles Edit)" - 6:19
5. Sharon Phillips - "Want 2 / Need 2 (Trentemøller Remix)" - 6:02
6. Tomboy - "Flamingo (Trentemøller Remix)" 9:05
7. Djuma Soundsystem - "Les Djinns (Trentemøller Remix)" - 6:15
8. Martinez - "Shadowboxing (Trentemøller Remix)" - 6:14
9. Blue Foundation - As I Movedon (Run Jeremy Band's 12 Inch Pleasure Mix)" - 4:43
10. Trentemøller - "African People" - 6:43
11. Trentemøller - "Prana" - 6:31

== Charts ==
Chart (2007)	Peak position
Belgium Albums Chart (Flanders)	28
Danish Albums Chart	13
French Albums Chart	149
