= Ane Trolle =

Danish singer and songwriter (born 1979)

Ane Trolle (born 1979) is a Danish singer and songwriter. She contributes notably on Trentemøller's album The Last Resort where she provides vocals for the song "Moan".

Trolle is known for her collaborations with other artists. Besides Trentemøller, she joined Peder for his song "White Lillies", which featured on Hôtel Costes, Vol. 10, a compilation CD mixed by French DJ Stéphane Pompougnac.

Trolle also joined forces with fellow Copenhagen artist Pato Siebenhaar for “Sweet Dogs” which they released under the name Trolle//Siebenhaar. Ane’s textured and urban voice glides above a weathered reggae production.

Along with Tim Myers, she performed in a duo called Lucy & the Cloud Parade who released an album called "Cloud 9". The duo released two singles from the CD named "Whistle, Clap, Hey!" and "Feel Lucky".

In 2007, Trolle collaborated with Josephine Phillip in the colorful duo JaConfetti. Their CD The Rainbow Express was released in August 2007. In September 2007, Ane Trolle and Steffen Brandt appeared in a series of off-season concerts on the Danish island of Bornholm with trumpeter Palle Mikkelborg, poets Jørgen Leth and Lone Hørslev, musician Mads Mouritz and others.

In Autumn 2008, Trolle recorded a song for one of The Danish Electricity Saving Trust's (Elsparefondens) commercials. In June 2010, her song "Feel Lucky" became the theme song for Telus' new internet/TV service "Optik" in Canada.

In October 2012, Trolle's first solo CD, Honest Wall, was released. It received great reviews in the Danish music magazine Gaffa, drawing a 5/6 review.

== Discography ==
=== Albums ===
Year	Album	Peak positions	Certification
Year	Album	DEN	Certification
2012	The Honest Wall	29	

=== Singles ===
Featured in

Year	Single	Peak positions		Certification
Year	Single	DEN	BEL (Vl)	Certification
2007	"Moan" (Trentemøller feat. Ane Trolle)	3	30	
