= Viborg Kunsthal =

Coordinates: 56°27′00″N 9°24′57″E

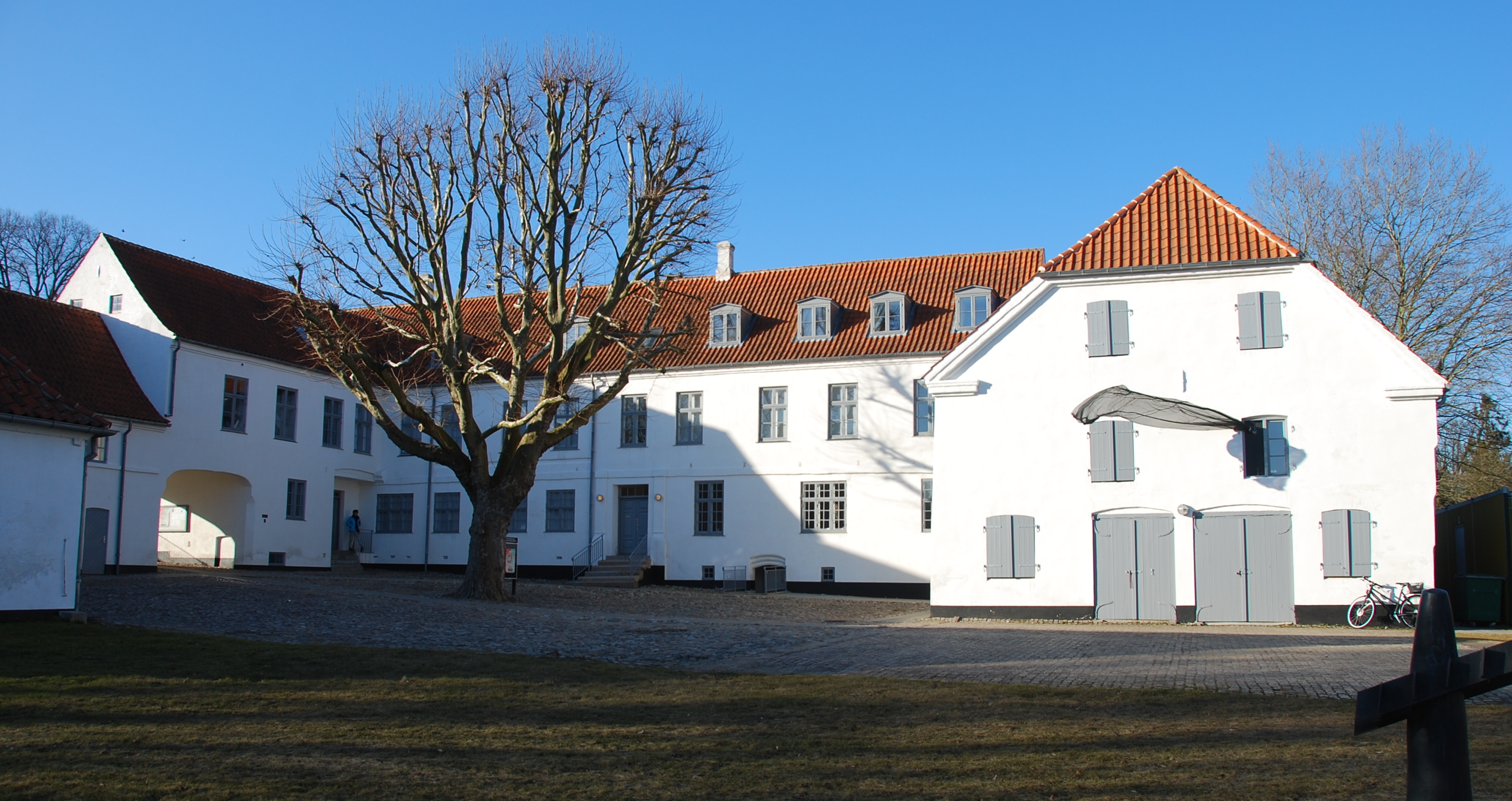

The Viborg Kunsthal located at Søndersø, Viborg, Denmark, presents changing exhibitions with renowned Danish and international artists and has existed since 1994. It has since been one of the leading exhibition venues for contemporary art in Denmark and is visited by over 20,000 patrons annually.

The art hall has a special focus on the living and creative arts, and has a number of concurrent events in connection including exhibitions, artist talks, lectures, concerts and workshops for children and adults. The art hall has an art school with teaching rooms, artist residency and studios where artists can live and work.

== Historic building ==
The Kunsthallen is housed in an historic building from 1734, which in the 19th century was used for the production of spirits, under the former name Kunsthal Brændigården. Additionally cited historic uses include an alcohol ambulatory, reception for mental health care patients and private housing. The surrounding garden is enclosed by a wall with a 500m2 mosaic decoration by the Danish artist Mette Winckelmann (inaugurated November 2013). The more than 100 patterns refer to the place's history, which dates back to the Middle Ages, when Knud the Great came from England and was crowned King of Denmark in Viborg. Due to archaeological finds, it is believed that the king lived where the art hall stands today.

The oldest part of the Brännigården dates back to 1734, when the Saxon architect and builder Johann Gottfried Hödrich erected the main building in one loggerhead. Later, an additional floor was added in the 19th century. The four-wing plant has been protected since 1950.

== Present day ==
In 1994, the building was designed as an art hall and has since been one of the leading exhibition venues for contemporary art in Denmark. Prior artist exhibitions include notable works of Henrik Vibskov, Andreas Emenius, Per Arnoldi, Kent Klich

Viborg Kunsthal also has a well-established residency program, offering workshop facilities, assistance for practical and art-related tasks, and access to a local, national and international network.
