= Hyun-kyung =

- Hangul: 현경
- RR: Hyeongyeong
- MR: Hyŏn'gyŏng

Hyun-kyung, also spelled Hyun-kyoung or Hyon-gyong, is a Korean given name.

People with this name include:

== Entertainers ==
- Oh Hyun-kyung (born 1970), South Korean actress
- Ryu Hyun-kyung (born 1983), South Korean actress
- Uhm Hyun-kyung (born 1986), South Korean actress

== Sportspeople ==
- Yoon Hyun-kyung (born 1986), South Korean team handball player
- Kang Hyun-kyung (born 1995), South Korean track cyclist
- Kim Hyon-gyong (born 1995), North Korean wrestler

== Other ==
- Chung Hyun Kyung (born 1956), South Korean Christian theologian
- So Hyun-kyung (born 1965), South Korean screenwriter
- Mary H.K. Choi (born Choi Hyun-kyung, 1979), South Korean-born American writer
- Hyon Gyon (born Park Hyun-kyoung, 1979), South Korean artist

== See also ==
- List of Korean given names
