= The Last Resort (album) =

Studio album by Trentemøller
- Released: 9 October 2006
- Recorded: 2005–2006
- Genre: Electronic, downtempo, minimal
- Length: 77:34 (Standard Edition); 153:51 (Limited Edition)
- Label: Poker Flat Recordings
- Producer: Trentemøller

Trentemøller chronology
The Last Resort (2006)	The Trentemøller Chronicles (2007)

Singles from The Last Resort
- 1. "Always Something Better" Released: 11 September 2006; 2. "Moan" Released: 12 March 2007; 3. "Miss You" Released: 27 March 2008

The Last Resort is the debut album by Danish electronic musician Trentemøller. It was released on 9 October 2006. The album debuted at No. 5 on the Danish Albums Chart. In Denmark, The Last Resort was certified platinum in October 2009 for sales over 30,000 copies, a rare feat for an electronic music album. It is also available in a Limited Edition which includes a bonus disc with some of Trentemøller's previous 12-inch singles.

== Reception ==
Professional ratings
Review scores
Source	Rating
AllMusic	4/5 stars
Gaffa	5/6 stars
Pitchfork	7.2/10
Politiken	5/6 stars
Resident Advisor	5/5

Philip Sherburne of Pitchfork compared the album to Thom Yorke's The Eraser. Resident Advisor—an online magazine with a focus on electronic music—named The Last Resort as the fifth best album of 2006. They also named it the 28th best album of the decade. The Danish newspaper Politiken gave the album 5 out of 6 stars, and named it the second best Danish album of 2006, dubbing him "the hero of techno".

== Track listing ==
All tracks are written by Anders Trentemøller.

No.	Title	Length
1.	"Take Me into Your Skin"	7:43
2.	"Vamp"	4:33
3.	"Evil Dub"	6:15
4.	"Always Something Better"	6:10
5.	"While the Cold Winter Waiting"	5:04
6.	"Nightwalker"	4:08
7.	"Like Two Strangers"	3:25
8.	"The Very Last Resort"	8:31
9.	"Snowflake"	7:33
10.	"Chameleon"	6:57
11.	"Into the Trees (Serenetti Part 3)"	7:22
12.	"Moan"	5:50
13.	"Miss You"	4:03

The Singles – Limited Edition Bonus CD
No.	Title	Length
1.	"Always Something Better" (Vocal Version) (feat. Richard Davis)	6:12
2.	"Moan" (Vocal Version) (feat. Ane Trolle)	5:46
3.	"Physical Fraction"	7:02
4.	"Polar Shift"	8:28
5.	"Chameleon"	7:58
6.	"Sunstroke"	8:28
7.	"Always Something Better" (Trentemøller Remix)	7:59
8.	"Nam Nam"	5:41
9.	"Killer Kat"	7:06
10.	"Rykketid"	5:12
11.	"Prana"	6:25

== Personnel ==
- Anders Trentemøller – production, instruments, programming, guitar (1 and 8), bass (2), celesta (4 and 7), glockenspiel and melodica (5), carillon (7)
- Henrik Vibskov – acoustic drums (1 and 11)
- Mikael Simpson – distorted bass (1), acoustic guitar (8)
- Karl Bille – bass (2)
- Arnaud Donez – guitar and bass (3)
- Thomas "DJ T.O.M." Bertelsen – scratch solo (4)
- Ossian Ryner – assistant engineer

== Charts and certifications ==
=== Charts ===
Chart (2006)	Peak position
Belgium Albums Chart (Flanders)	62
Danish Albums Chart	5
French Albums Chart	148

=== Certifications ===
Country	Certifications (sales thresholds)
Denmark	Platinum

In 2011, it was awarded a gold certification from the Independent Music Companies Association which indicated sales of at least 75,000 copies throughout Europe.
