= Trentemøller =

Danish musician and composer (born 1972)

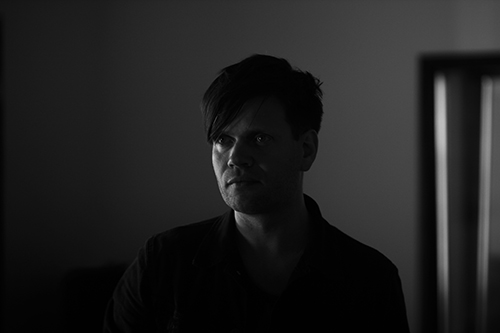
- Trentemøller in 2014

Background information
- Born: Anders Trentemøller; 16 October 1972 (age 54); Vordingborg, Denmark
- Origin: Copenhagen, Denmark
- Genres: Alternative rock; shoegaze; dreampop; electronic; darkwave; ambient
- Occupations: Musician; producer; songwriter
- Years active: 1997–present
- Labels: In My Room; Poker Flat Recordings; hfn music
- Website: www.trentemoller.com

Anders Trentemøller (Danish: [ˈɑnɐs ˈtsʰʁɑntəˌmøˀlɐ]; born 16 October 1972) is a Danish indie artist, producer, and multi-instrumentalist based in Copenhagen, Denmark.

== History ==
Trentemøller started music in the late 1990s with different indie rock projects. In 2006, following a line of more electronic-orientated 12-inch EPs, Trentemøller released his debut album, The Last Resort. In 2007 he assembled his first full live band, with Henrik Vibskov on drums and Mikael Simpson on guitar. Complete with visuals from director Karim Ghahwagi, the ensuing ‘Trentemøller: Live In Concert’ tour brought him to the United States for the first time as well as to festivals including Glastonbury (UK), Roskilde (Denmark) and Melt! (Germany).

In 2009, The Trentemøller Chronicles, a double compilation of unreleased songs, non-album tracks and remixes for acts including Röyksopp, Moby and The Knife, was released. He also headlined the Orange Stage at Roskilde Festival, playing for 60,000 people, with a set design created by Vibskov.

After starting up his own record label, In My Room, Trentemøller's second album Into the Great Wide Yonder was released in 2010. It was a move into a more analogue sound influenced by indie and post-punk, and incorporating more live instrumentation and vocals. Expanding his live band to seven people, he continued to tour around the world for two years. His appearance at 2011's Coachella Festival was described by NME as “one of the biggest breakouts of Coachella,” saying he “stunned all onlookers and became the toast of the fest.” Trentemøller toured widely across the US and appeared on Carson Daly. The world tour ended with two shows in Christiania, Copenhagen, released as the live album Live In Copenhagen.

Following his second album, Reworked/Remixed was released, a compilation of Trentemøller's remixes for other artists and other musicians' reworking of his music including Modeselektor, UNKLE, Franz Ferdinand, Andrew Weatherall, Efterklang and Depeche Mode. Trentemøller's music has also been used by film directors, including Oliver Stone (Savages), Pedro Almodóvar (The Skin I Live In), and Jacques Audiard (Rust and Bone).

In September 2013, Trentemøller released his third full-length album Lost, including collaborations with Low, Jonny Pierce from The Drums, Marie Fisker, Kazu Makino of Blonde Redhead, Jana Hunter of Lower Dens, Ghost Society and Sune Wagner of The Raveonettes. That year, Trentemøller also supported Depeche Mode on their Delta Machine world tour and appeared at Melt!, Dour, Pitch and Zurich Open Air. In 2014, Trentemøller composed the theme for the AMC series Halt and Catch Fire. In 2014, Lost was awarded a silver certification from the Independent Music Companies Association, which indicated sales of at least 20,000 copies throughout Europe.

Trentemøller's fourth album, Fixion, was released on 16 September 2016. It featured vocals by Marie Fisker, Lisbet Fritze and Jehnny Beth.

A fifth album, Obverse, was released in 2019. It was nominated for IMPALA's European Independent Album of the Year Award 2019, but did not win.

Trentemøller has frequently collaborated with Swedish artist Andreas Emenius, who directed music videos for the songs Come Undone (2014), Deceive (2014), Complicated (2016), and Redefine (2016).

On 13 September 2024, Trentemøller released his sixth album, Dreamweaver, written, produced and mixed by Trentemøller and featuring vocals performed by Dísa Jakobs.

== Style and influences ==
Trentemøller's later music has been described as synthwave and pop. His early tracks (especially those on The Last Resort) show influences drawing from early downtempo and trip hop, minimal, glitch, and darkwave, often incorporating a cinematic feel. He cited amongst his influences Siouxsie and the Banshees, My Bloody Valentine, Slowdive, Joy Division, The Cure, Low, Depeche Mode, Cocteau Twins and OMD.

== Discography ==
=== Albums ===
Year	Album	Peak positions								Certification
Year	Album	DEN	AUT	BEL (Fl)	BEL (Wa)	FRA	GER	NL	SWI	Certification
2006	The Last Resort	5	—	62	—	148	—	—	—	
2010	Into the Great Wide Yonder	2	—	27	79	142	37	86	41	
2013	Live in Copenhagen	—	—	—	—	—	—	—	—	
2013	Lost	2	63	40	40	152	65	85	38	
2016	Fixion	16	—	24	40	167	53	—	47	
2019	Obverse	—	—	158	128	—	99	—	65	
2022	Memoria	—	—	111	136	—	69	—	71	
2024	Dreamweaver									
2026	Trentemøller									

=== Compilations ===
- 2007 – The Trentemøller Chronicles
- 2009 – Harbour Boat Trips 01
- 2011 – Reworked/Remixed
- 2011 – Late Night Tales
- 2014 – Lost Reworks
- 2014 – Early Worx
- 2018 – Harbour Boat Trips 02

=== Singles and EPs ===
- 2003 – Trentemøller EP
- 2004 – Beta Boy
- 2005 – Physical Fraction
- 2005 – Kink
- 2005 – Polar Shift
- 2005 – Serenetti
- 2006 – Sunstroke
- 2006 – Nam Nam E.P.
- 2006 – Rykketid
- 2006 – Always Something Better
- 2007 – An Evening With Bobi Bros (woith DJ Tom) / 25 Timer (with Vildtand, Krede, Buda)
- 2007 – African People
- 2007 – Moan - IFPI DEN: Platinum
- 2007 – Gamma (with Buda)
- 2007 – Moan (Dub & Instrumental)
- 2007 – Take Me Into Your Skin (Nudisco Edit)
- 2008 – Miss You (Remixes)
- 2008 – Live in Concert EP (Live at Roskilde 2007)
- 2009 – Vamp / Miss You
- 2009 – Rauta EP (with DJ Lab)
- 2010 – Sycamore Feeling
- 2010 – ... Even Though You're With Another Girl
- 2010 – Silver Surfer, Ghost Rider Go!!!
- 2011 – Shades Of Marble (Remixes)
- 2011 – Raincoats / Tide (with Efterklang)
- 2012 – My Dreams
- 2013 – Never Stop Running
- 2013 – Candy Tongue
- 2013 – Gravity
- 2014 – Deceive
- 2016 – River in Me
- 2016 – Redefine
- 2017 – One Eye Open
- 2017 – Complicated
- 2017 – Hands Down
- 2018 – Transformer Man
- 2019 – Sleeper

=== Documentary ===
- 2017 – The Science of Fixion

=== Production work ===
- 2004 – Mikael Simpson - Er Du Kommet For A Faa Noget?
- 2006 – Mikael Simpson – Mist Dig Selv I Mig
- 2008 – Det som ingen ved (movie soundtrack)
- 2011 – Darkness Falls – Alive In Us
- 2012 – Dorit Chrysler - Avalanche
- 2014 – Giana Factory – Lemon Moon
- 2018 – 2nd Blood – Running Blind

=== Remixes ===
- 2003 – Djuma Soundsystem – Les
- 2004 – The Rhythm Slaves – The Light You Will See
- 2004 – Aphex Twin – Windowlicker (with Buda) (Unofficial)
- 2005 – Laid Back – People (with Banzai
- 2005 – Varano – Dead End Street
- 2005 – Pet Shop Boys – Sodom
- 2005 – Röyksopp – What Else Is There?
- 2005 – The Knife – We Share Our Mothers' Health
- 2005 – Moby – Go
- 2006 – Blue Foundation – As I Moved On (with Buda)
- 2006 – Djosos Krost – Chapter One
- 2006 – Trentemøller – Always Something Better
- 2007 – Trentemøller – Moan
- 2007 – JaConfetti – Hold Nu Kay
- 2007 – Robyn – Konichiwa Bitches
- 2007 – Klovn – McKlaren
- 2007 – The Blacksmoke Organisation – Danger Global Warming
- 2007 – Tomboy – Flamingo
- 2007 – Kira Skov - Religiously Young
- 2008 – Kasper Bjørke – Doesn't Matter
- 2008 – The Raveonettes – Aly, Walk With Me
- 2008 – The Raveonettes – Lust
- 2008 – Modeselektor – The White Flash (feat. Thom Yorke)
- 2008 – Trentemøller – Miss You
- 2009 – Visti & Meyland – Yes Maam (All Nite Long)
- 2009 – Favelachic – Jungle-TV (with DJ T.O.M.)
- 2009 – Chris Isaak - Wicked Game (Unofficial)
- 2009 – Depeche Mode – Wrong
- 2009 – Franz Ferdinand – No You Girls
- 2010 – Trentemøller – Sycamore Feeling
- 2010 – Trentemøller – Silver Surfer, Ghost Rider Go!!!
- 2010 – Lars and The Hands Of Light – Me Me Me
- 2010 – Mew – Beach
- 2011 – UNKLE – The Answer (feat. Big In Japan)
- 2011 – Chimes & Bells – The Mole
- 2011 – Chimes & Bells – This Far
- 2011 – Trentemøller – Shades Of Marble
- 2011 – Efterklang – Raincoats
- 2011 – The Dø – Too Insistent
- 2011 – Giana Factory – Dirty Snow
- 2011 – Sleep Party People – The Dwarf And The Horse
- 2011 – Darkness Falls – The Void
- 2011 – Darkness Falls – Timeline
- 2011 – Trentemøller – Neverglade
- 2011 – Bruce Springsteen — State Trooper (Unofficial)
- 2011 – I Got You On Tape – Springsteen
- 2011 – Dorit Chrysler – Come On Home
- 2011 – M83 – Midnight City
- 2012 – The Drums – Days
- 2012 – Lower Dens — Brains
- 2012 – Medina – Forever
- 2012 – Mikael Simpson – Lad Det Staa
- 2012 – David Lynch – Pinky's Dream
- 2013 – Howl Baby Howl — That Good Night
- 2013 – The Warlocks — Shake The Dope Out
- 2013 – Jakob Bro — Terrace Place
- 2014 – Reptile Youth – JJ
- 2014 – Jenny Wilson – Pyramids (Rose Out of Our Pain)
- 2014 – Eliot Sumner - Information
- 2014 – Fraser Mcguinness - The Sun Moves On
- 2014 – Future 3 feat. Benoit Pioulard - Revenant
- 2014 – RA - Prism
- 2014 – Trentemøller — River Of Life
- 2014 – Trentemøller — Come Undone
- 2014 – Trentemøller — Deceive
- 2014 – Mames Babegenush - A Woman (feat. Reculture)
- 2016 – Mellemblond - Nord
- 2016 – The Soft Moon - Black
- 2016 – Kira Skov - I Celebrate My Life
- 2016 – Jennylee - Boom Boom
- 2016 – Trentemøller — River In Me
- 2016 – Savages - Surrender
- 2017 – UNKLE — Looking for the Rain
- 2017 – TOYDRUM feat. Joel Wells - Void & Form
- 2017 – Trentemøller — One Eye Open
- 2017 – Trentemøller — Hands Down
- 2018 – A Place To Bury Strangers — Never Coming Back
- 2020 – School of X — Write My Name
- 2020 – 2nd Blood — Turn It Back
- 2020 – Blaue Blume — Lovable
- 2020 – ReMission International — TOS2020
- 2020 – TOM And His Computer — Puzzle (feat. Roxy Jules)
- 2021 – Tricky — Like A Stone
- 2021 – Loa & Koan — J.P. and the End of the World
- 2022 – The KVB — Lumens
- 2022 – Luster — IT FOLLOWS YOU NOW
- 2022 – A Place to Bury Strangers — I'm Hurt
- 2025 — The Cure — And Nothing Is Forever

=== Awards and nominations ===
Trentemøller has received two Danish Music Awards for his 2006 debut album The Last Resort, in the categories "Danish Electronica Release of the Year" and "Danish Producer of the Year", in 2007. He was first awarded a Danish DeeJay Award in 2004 for his EP Trentemøller EP, and have since received a total of 11 awards. In 2010 Trentemøller was nominated "Best Remixed Recording, Non-Classical" at the 52nd Grammy Awards for his remix of Franz Ferdinand's "No You Girls".

Year	Award	Category	Nominated work	Result
2004	Danish DeeJay Award	Danish Up Front Release of the Year	Trentemøller EP	Won
2005	Danish DeeJay Award	Danish Producer of the Year		Nominated
2006	Danish DeeJay Award	Danish Artist of the Year		Nominated
2006	Danish DeeJay Award	Danish Remix of the Year	Röyksopp - "What Else Is There?" (Trentemøller Remix)	Won
2006	Danish DeeJay Award	Danish DeeJay Favourite of the Year	"Rykketid"	Won
2006	Danish DeeJay Award	Danish Producer of the Year		Won
2006	Danish DeeJay Award	Danish Up Front Release of the Year	"Rykketid"	Won
2007	Danish DeeJay Award	Danish Artist of the Year		Won
2007	Danish DeeJay Award	Danish Album of the Year	The Last Resort	Won
2007	Danish DeeJay Award	Danish Remix of the Year	Moby - Go! (Trentemøller Remix)	Won
2007	Danish DeeJay Award	Danish Producer of the Year		Won
2007	Danish Music Award	Danish New Act of the Year		Nominated
2007	Danish Music Award	Danish Electronica Release of the Year	The Last Resort	Won
2007	Danish Music Award	Danish Producer of the Year	The Last Resort	Won
2007	Steppeulv	Album of the Year	The Last Resort	Nominated
2007	Steppeulv	Musician of the Year		Nominated
2007	Steppeulv	Composer of the Year		Won
2007	Steppeulv	Producer of the Year		Nominated
2008	Steppeulv	Live Act of the Year		Won
2008	Beatport Music Award	Best Chillout Artist		Won
2008	Beatport Music Award	Best Electronica Artist		Won
2008	Beatport Music Award	Best Minimal Artist		Nominated
2008	Beatport Music Award	Best Tech House Artist		Nominated
2008	Danish DeeJay Award	Danish Artist of the Year		Won
2008	Danish DeeJay Award	Danish DeeJay Favourite of the Year	"Moan" (feat. Ane Trolle)	Nominated
2008	Danish DeeJay Award	Danish Up Front Release of the Year	"Moan" (feat. Ane Trolle)	Won
2010	P3 Guld	The P3 Live Award	Roskilde Festival 2009	Nominated
2010	Grammy Award	Best Remixed Recording, Non-Classical	Franz Ferdinand - "No You Girls" (Trentemøller Remix)	Nominated
2010	Danish DeeJay Award	Danish Remix of the Year	Franz Ferdinand - "No You Girls" (Trentemøller Remix)	Nominated
