= Kunsthallen Nikolaj =

Contemporary arts centre in Copenhagen, Denmark

Coordinates: 55°40′43″N 12°34′53″E

Nikolaj Kunsthal
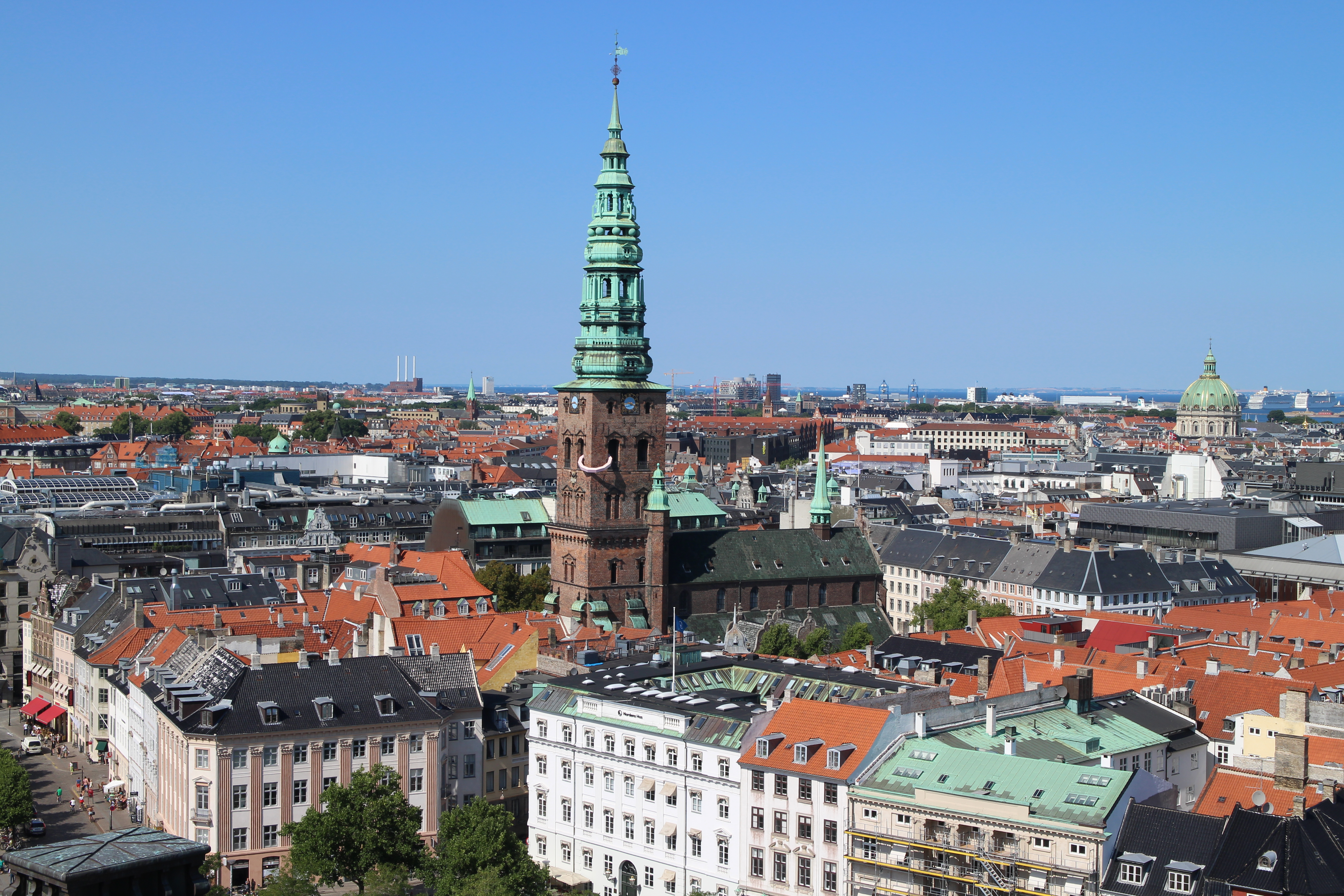
- Established: 1200
- Location: Nikolaj Plads, Copenhagen, Denmark
- Type: Contemporary Art Centre
- Director: Helene Nyborg Bay
- Website: https://nikolajkunsthal.kk.dk/en

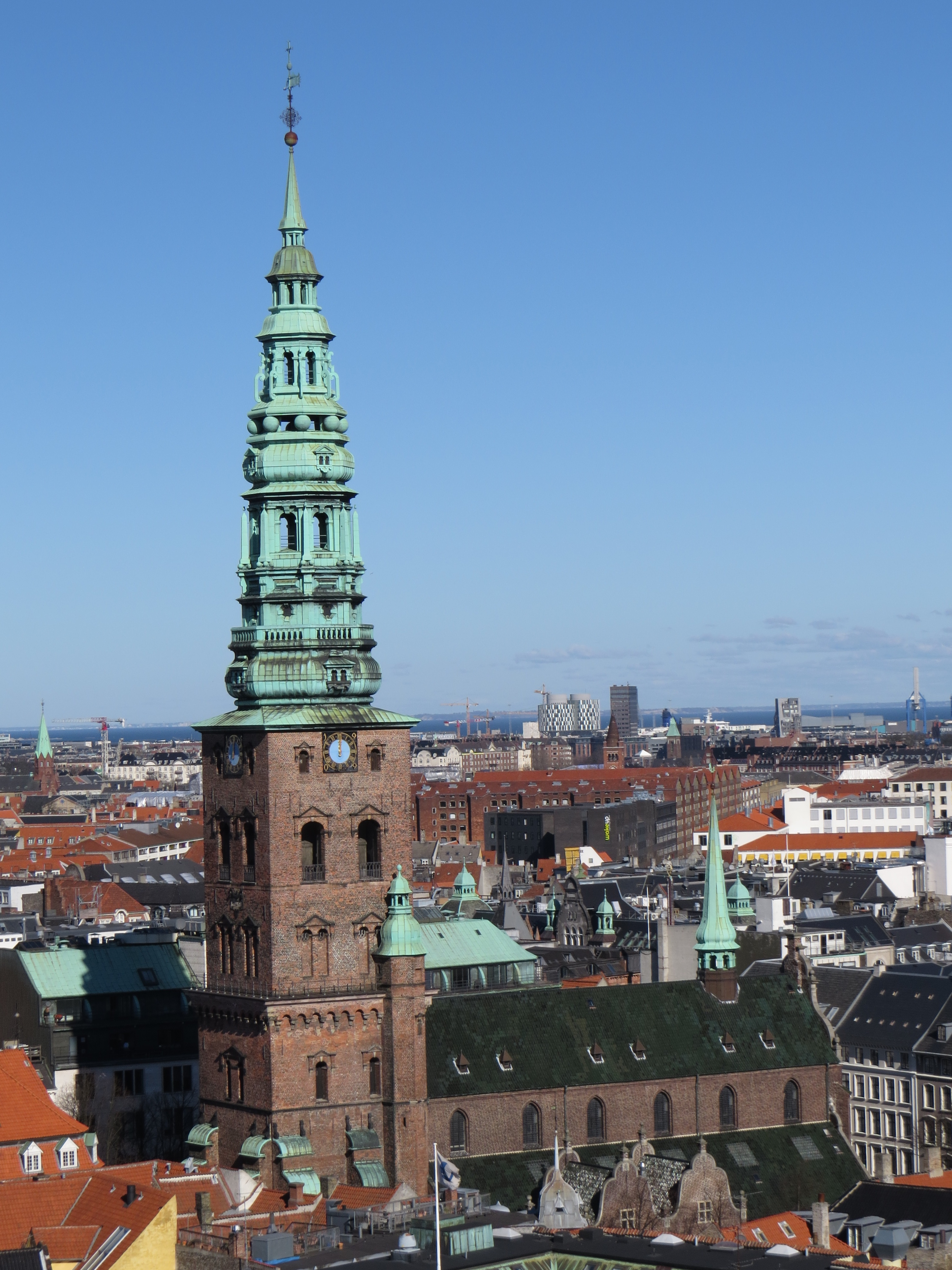
Nikolaj Kunsthal

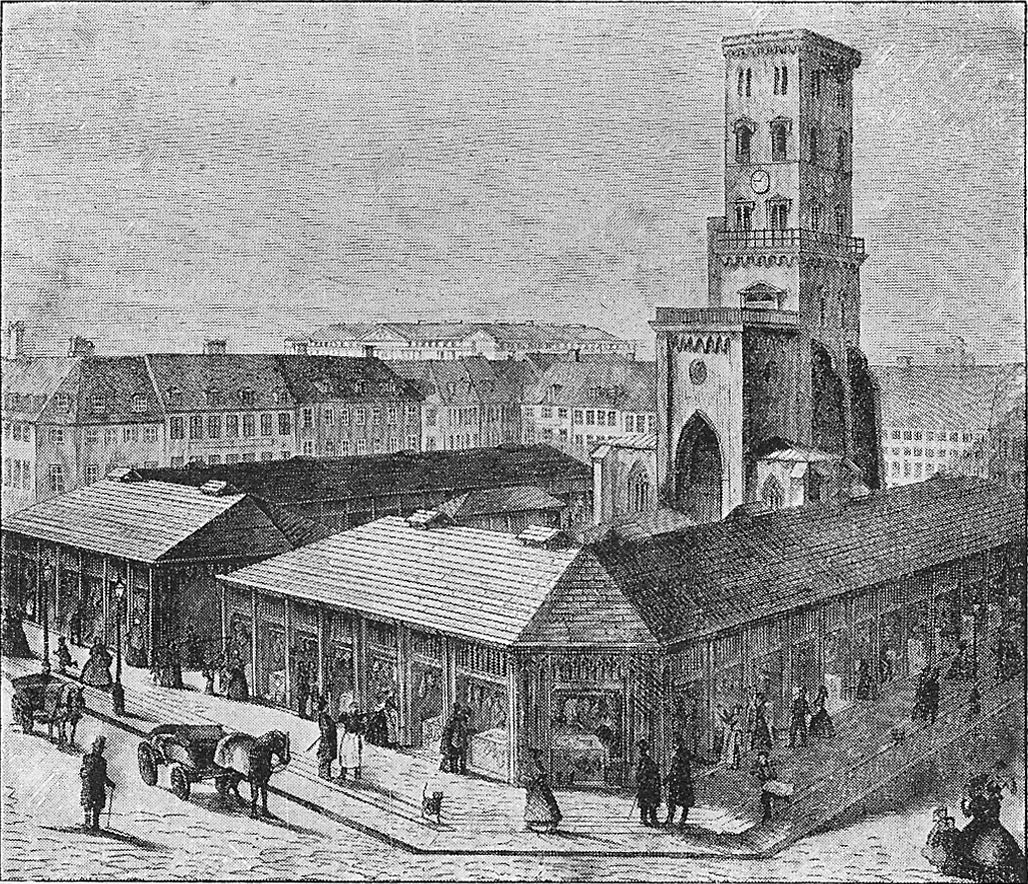
'Maven' / 'The Stomach', Nikolaj Church

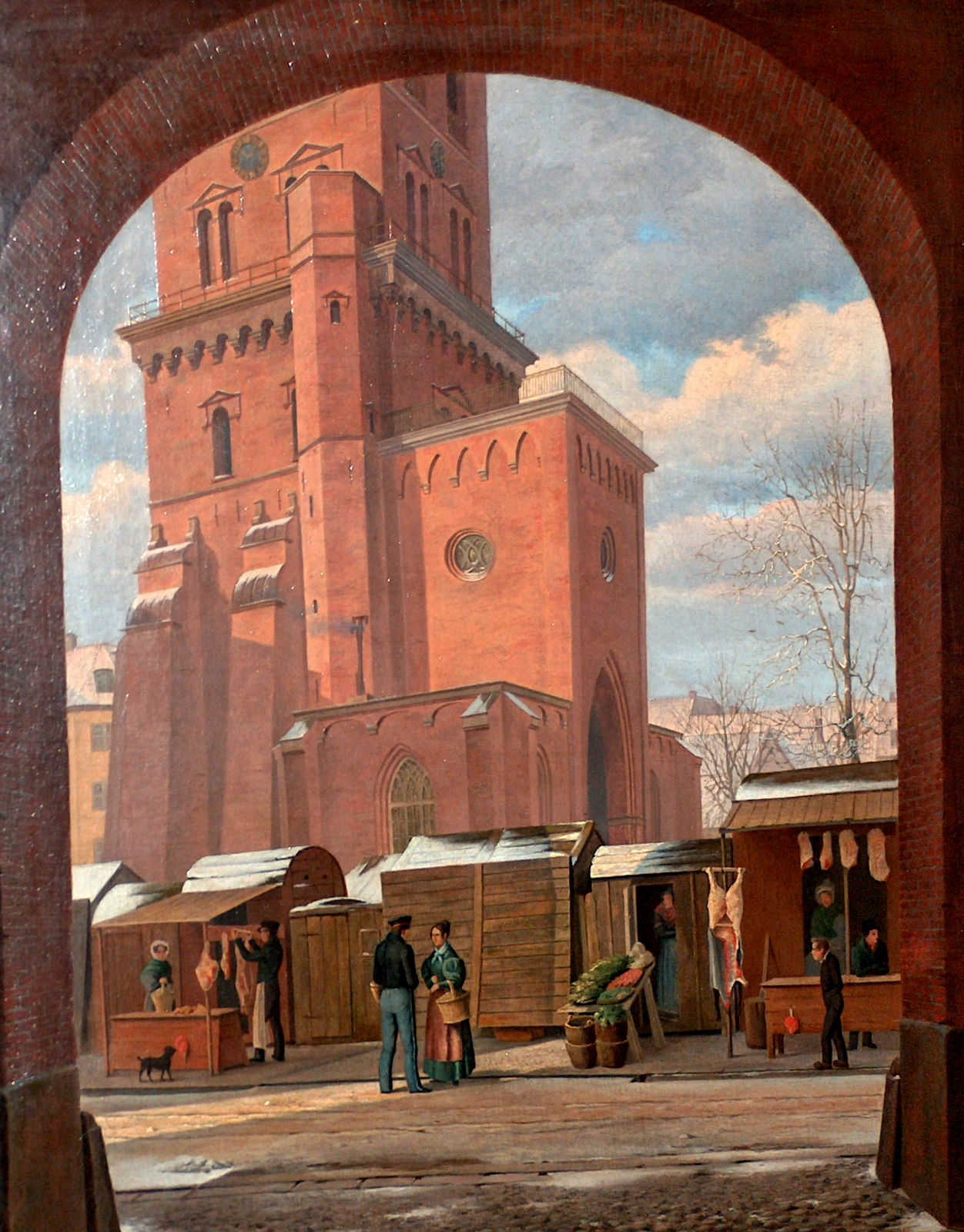
'Maven' / 'The Stomach', Nikolaj Church

Nikolaj Kunsthal is a contemporary arts center in Copenhagen which occupies the former St. Nicholas Church. It is one of the city's oldest churches and an architectural landmark. It is situated on Nikolaj Plads, a few steps away from Amagertorv and Strøget. The church building is noted for its fanciful Neo-Baroque 90 m (300 ft) long spire. The tower is the third highest in Copenhagen.

== History and architecture ==
=== St Nicholas Church ===
The original church building was constructed in the early thirteenth century and is one of Copenhagen’s oldest churches. It was located near Copenhagen's shore of the Øresund, and named after the patron saint of seafarers St. Nicholas. The church did not have a tower or spire when it was originally built. In 1530, the Lutheran theologian Hans Tavsen (1494–1561) preached the first Lutheran sermon within Copenhagen in St Nicholas Church. He became known as the ‘Danish Luther’ and the church was the center of the Lutheran Reformation in Copenhagen. The Dutch renaissance church tower was built in 1591. During a winter storm in 1628, the church lost its spire.

The fire of 1795 burned down most of the building, and there was not enough funding to rebuild it. In 1805, the congregation was dissolved and it was no longer an official church. Though church ruins were demolished, the sturdy tower survived and can be seen in the front hall of Nikolaj Kunsthal today.

=== A versatile tower for business and culture ===
From 1805 to 1868, the ruins of the tower functioned as a fire outlook post for the City Watchmen. The tower also functioned as a ‘time-ball’ from 1868 to 1908. Every day at 1pm a large ball would fall down on a pole, letting the locals and ships know what time it was. Until the second half of the 1800, the surrounding area functioned as Copenhagen meatpacking district and became known as ‘Maven (The Stomach).’ The artist and inventor Robert Storm Petersen began his career as an apprentice working in his fathers butchers shop in ‘Maven.’ Butcher stalls occupied the area around the tower until the second half of the 1800s when they were closed.

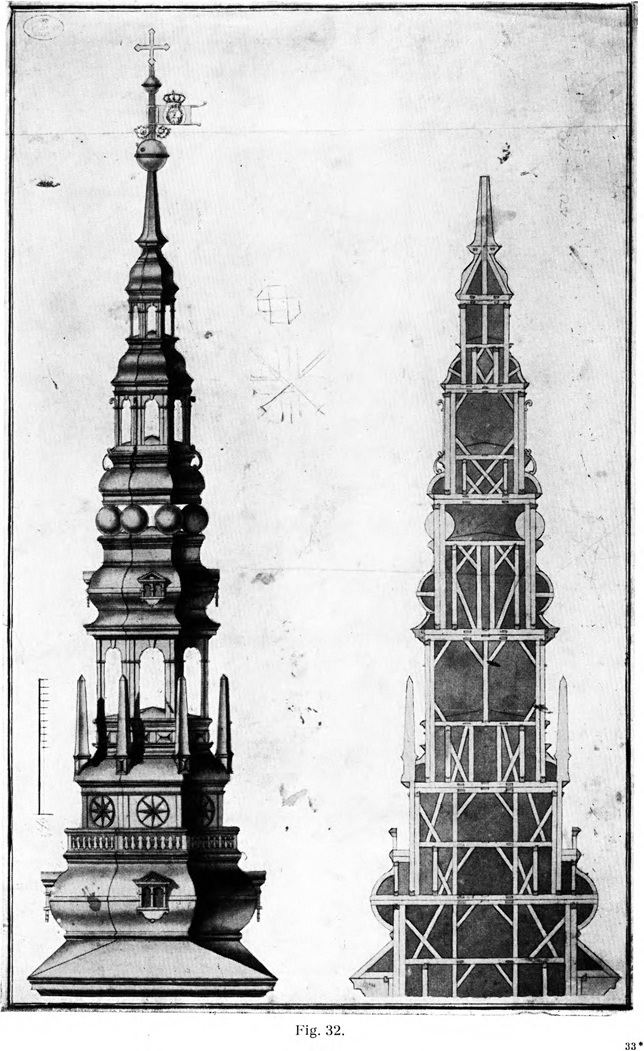
Nikolaj Church tower

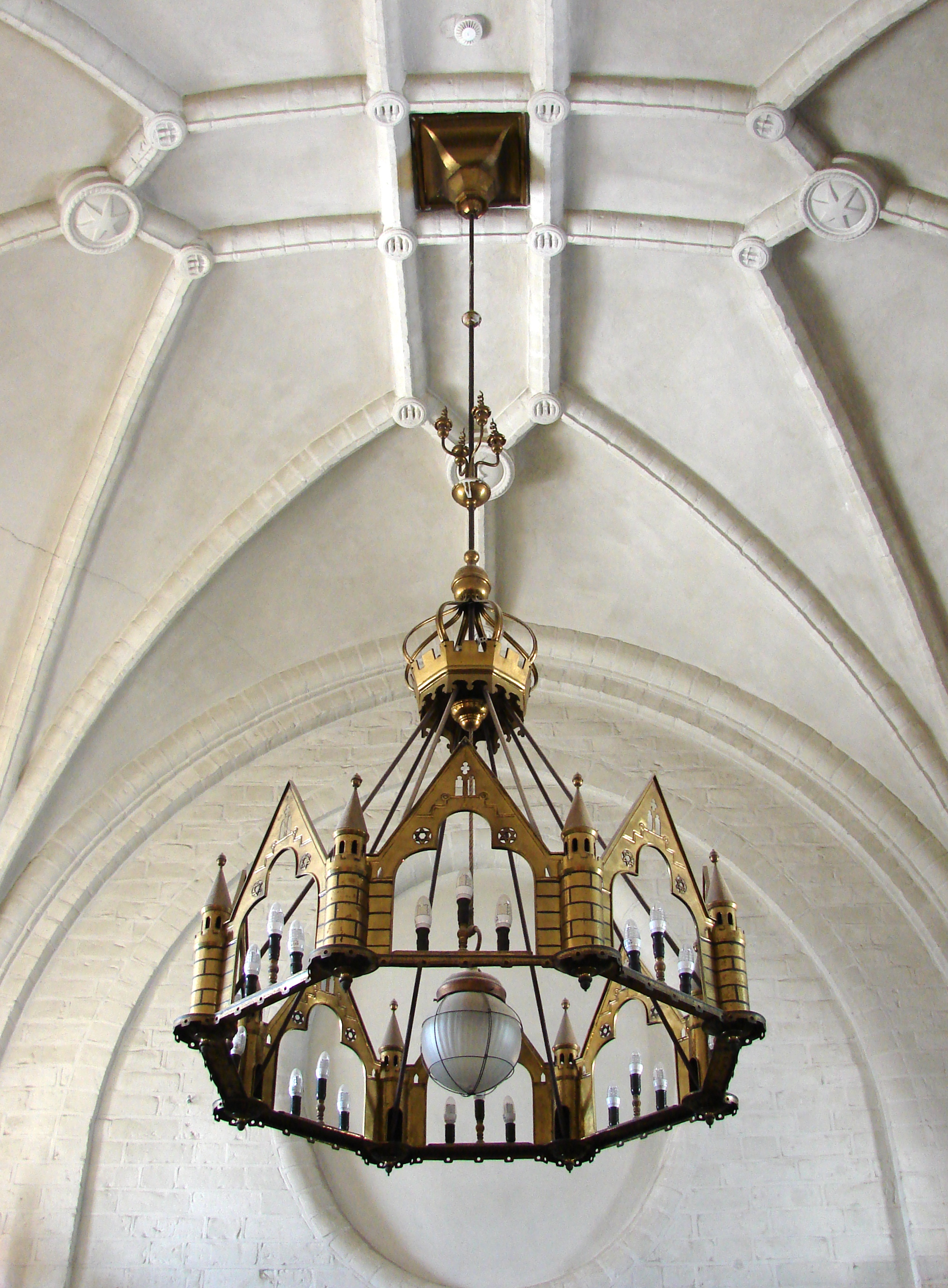
Nikolaj Church

The tower was also the focus of Hans Christian Andersen's drama, Love of Nicolai Tower performed in 1829 at the Royal Theatre. When the internationally notable Danish sculptor Bertel Thorvaldsen returned to Copenhagen in 1838 after living and working for 40 years in Rome, a flag was hoisted on the tower when his ship approached to alert residents of his arrival.

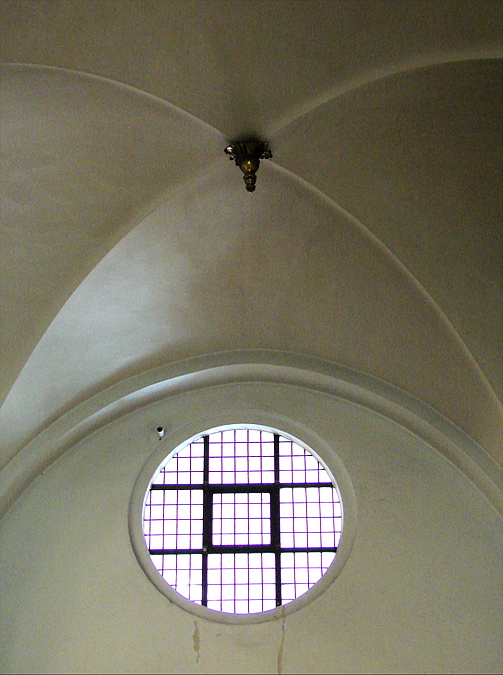
Nikolaj Church

The current building, which opened in 1912, is by a design of the architect, Hans Christian Amberg (1749–1815), representing a modern reconstruction of the destroyed church. The building is recognised for its red bricks and Neo-Baroque church windows. The current spire is also a modern reconstruction of the original, financed in 1905 at the initiative and expense of the brewer Carl Jacobsen (1842-1914). A topping out ceremony for the new spire for the old Tower was held in 1909. The 35-meter tower is the third highest in Copenhagen and adorned in iridescent green copper.

St Nicholas Church was rebuilt with the support of The Permanent Secretary P.N. Rentzmann and his sister Ida P.N. Rentzmann, who bequeathed their fortune to the reconstruction and reestablishment of the church. The Permanent Secretary P.N. Rentzmann lived in an apartment in the building until his death in 1923. The church was used by The Veterinary Council during First World War. With the completion of the renovation of the building, the mayor of Copenhagen decided that the church should be used for cultural activities, and it functioned as Copenhagen’s Public Library up until 1958 and a naval museum from 1958 to 1978. The church's organ was built by Marcussen & Son in 1930, and the first to have a mechanical action and slider chest in Denmark.

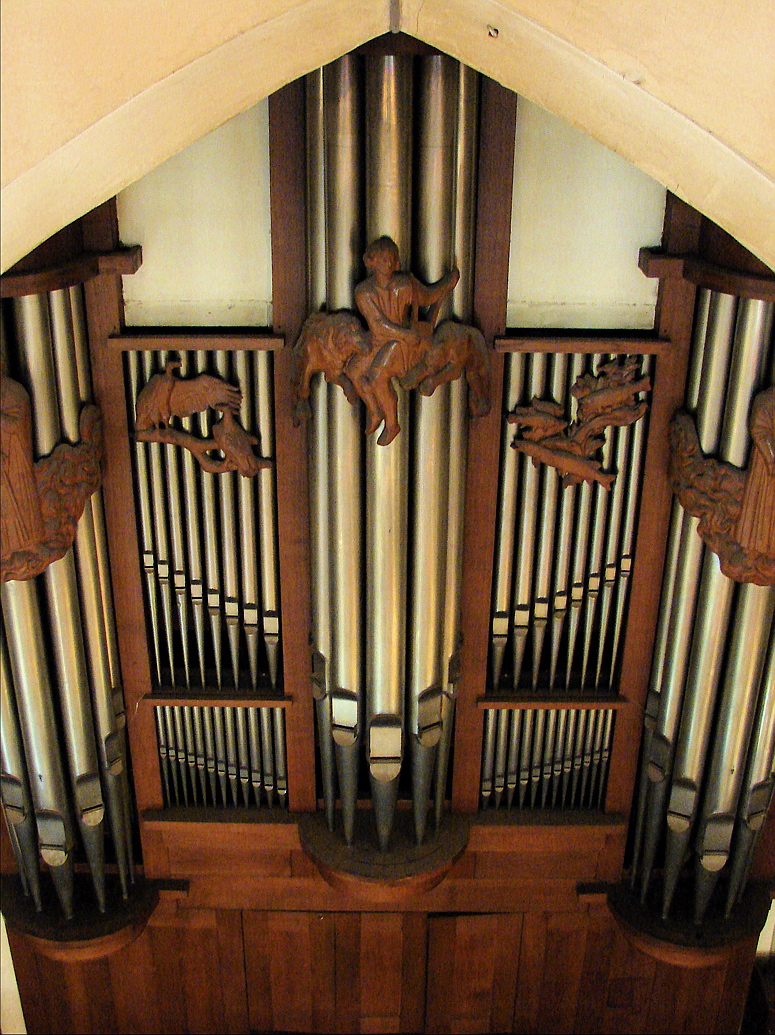
Nikolaj Church organ

=== An art center in Copenhagen ===
In 1957, art pioneer Knud Pedersen established a fine art library in the building, providing the opportunity to borrow original artworks. During this period, the venue hosted several noteworthy avant-garde events and exhibitions, including some of the earliest international Fluxus performances organized by Knud Pedersen and Arthur Köpcke in 1962.

Since 1981, the building has served as a Kunsthal and the City of Copenhagen's exhibition center for contemporary art. It was known as Nikolaj Udstillingsbygning till 2006, and Kunsthallen Nikolaj from 2006 to 2010. It has since 2010 been known as Nikolaj Kunsthal. Helene Nyborg Bay has since 2018 been Director of Nikolaj Kunsthal.

Nikolaj Kunsthal collaborates with a range of organisations locally, nationally and internationally in the realm of new artistic forms and media. The art center's focusses on Copenhagen's contemporary art scene, presenting a program of changing exhibitions and events which has included artists Leonard Cohen, Andreas Emenius, Helmut Newton, Ditte Ejlerskov, HuskMitNavn, Candice Breitz and Superflex.

== Directors ==
- Lise Funder (1984 - 1993)
- Elisabeth Delin Hansen (1993 - 2015)
- Andreas Brøgger (2015 - 2018)
- Helene Nyborg Bay (2018–present)

== Exhibitions ==
=== 2011 ===
- Space Invaders
- Hotel Nikolaj
- Jan Banning: Bureaucraties
- Afgang 11
- Gil & Moth: totally Devoted to You
- FOKUS 2011

=== 2012 ===
- Tracy Rose: Waiting for god
- Eva Koch: I Am the River
- Fluxus 50 år: Die Irren Sind Los
- Copenhagen Art Festival: Conversations
- Afgang 2012
- Mie Olise: Den Tavse Station
- Patrick Huse: Northern Imaginary 3rd Part
- Gruppeudstilling: Artreach
- FOKUS 2012

=== 2013 ===
- Karin Sander: Zeigen. En audiotur gennem København
- Marika Seidler: Human Animal
- Roger Ballen: Retroperspektiv
- Dias & Riedweg: Possible Archives
- Gruppeudstilling: Enten / Eller
- Eric Andersen: Liaison
- FOKUS 2013

=== 2014 ===
- Gruppeudstilling: Afghan Tales
- Lilibeth Cuenca Rasmussen: Being human being
- PIXELADE - en udstilling for alle fra 0 til 116
- Daniel & Geo Fuchs: Stasi Secret Room
- Shahzia Sikander: Parallax
- Hanne Nielsen & Birgit Johnsen: Drifting
- Jeanette Ehlers: Say it loud!
- FOKUS 2014

=== 2015 ===
- The Museum is Closed - An Exhibition about Knud Pedersen
- Embodied: Performance & documentary
- Copenhagen Art Festival: TRUST
- Group Show: Let There Be Light
- Clement Page: The Light that Obscures
- Stan Douglas: Fotografier 2008-2013
- FOKUS 2015
- Ian Ingram: Next Animals

=== 2016 ===
- Larissa Sansour: In the Future They Ate from the Finest Porcelain
- Rune Fjord & Trine Bastrup: Lost Love
- Trine Boesen: Holes in Space
- Santiago Sierra: Black Flag
- Group Show: Hybrid Matters
- Sectioning: My Holy Nacho
- John Akomfrah: Vertigo Sea
- FOKUS 2016
- The Lake: Works for Radio

=== 2017 ===
- Troels Lybecker & Christian Finne: Art in a Minefield
- Eske Kath & Oh Land: The Ship
- Japanese Connections
- Julian Rosefeldt: Works 2001-2016
- FOKUS 2017

=== 2018 ===
- Bank & Rau: Menneskebyen
- YOKE: Konstruktur
- HuskMitNavn: TEGN
- Arthur Van Der Zaag: Windows of Light
- Tommy Støckel: Things for a Symmetrical Tower
- Anohni: Miracle Now
- Haroon Mirza: Dancing with the Unknown
- FOKUS 2018
- Stine Marie Jacobsen: Law Shifters

=== 2019 ===
- Leonard Cohen: A Crack in Everything
- Camilla Brix Andersen: Supernova
- Korea in Denmark: Welcome to the Moon Palace
- Korea in Denmark: The Way a Hare Transforms into a Tortoise
- Anna Domnick: It's all white
- FOKUS 2019
- Andreas Emenius: When the Unknown becomes Familiar
- Lotte Nielsen: Haus of Dragons
- The Icelandic Love Corporation, Jacob Tækker: VIDEO VIDEO

=== 2020 ===
- Vibeke Bryld: Havfolket kalder mørknet vand
- Skate Works
- Venedig filmfestival VR i Nikolaj Kunsthal
- Hartmut Stockter: Flipperoraklet i panorama-arkaderne
- Nicolai Howalt: Variations of Old Tjikko
- FOKUS 2020

=== 2021 ===
- Lotte Nielsen: Letters from St. Petersburg
- Sisters Hope: Sensious City
- Foo/Skou: Disharmony of Spheres
- Lau & Maak: Fairy Tales
- Thomas Øvlisen: Anden Stjerne til højre
- Nikolaj: Københavns kunsthal 40 år
- David Lynch: Infinite Deep
- Nikoline Liv Andersen: Eden

=== 2022 ===
- DRIFT - Thorbjørn Lausten
- Anna Ørberg - Tech-High!
- CryptoPong - Radar Contemporary
- Ditte Ejlerskov - The Cult of Oxytocin
- Københavnerstykker - Rådet for Visuel Kunst 2018-2021
- Arto Saari - The Champagne of Skateboarding
- Planet VR
- Lasse Lau & Flo Maak - Hang On, Hang Tight

==== Platform ====
- Ditte Marie Frost & Mai Dengsøe
- Mette Riise & Rebecca Krasnik
- Ruby Mariama Laura Andersen Ndoye & Aysha Amin
- Clara Busch & Nanna Saplana
- Yujin Jung & Eli Ståhl
- Astrid Sonne & Ilethia Sharp

=== 2023 ===
- Shane Brox: Beauty in the Beast
- Kunstnernes København
- Mikkel Carl: Truth is like Poetry
- Tova Mozard: ILOVERUSS
- Signe Heinfelt & Jo Verwohlt: Interference
- Louise Bonde-Hansen: Neither Day nor Night

==== Platform ====
- Emilie Alstrup x Anna Bak
- Lydia Östberg Diakité x Awa Konaté
- Samara Sallam & Kate Sterchi
- Laurits Malthe Gulløv x Rebekka Elisabeth Anker-Møller
- Lina Hashim & Anne Zychalak Stolten
- Toke Højby Lorentzen & Marie Vinther

=== 2024 ===
- Rune Bering: Bycatch
- Super High End Underground
