= Elena Velez =

American fashion designer, artist (born 1994)

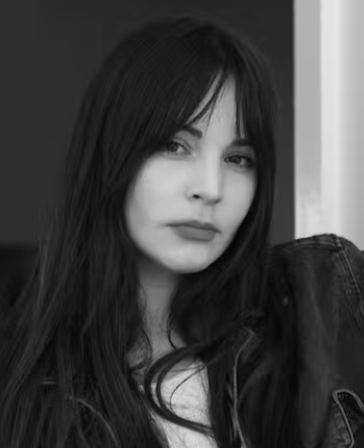
- Elena Velez at the Met Gala, 2023
- Born: Elena Velez; Milwaukee, Wisconsin, U.S.
- Education: Central Saint Martins, Parsons School of Design
- Occupation: Fashion Designer
- Spouse: Andreas Emenius
- Children: 2
- Website: www.elenavelez.com

Elena Velez is an American avant-garde fashion designer and creative from Milwaukee, Wisconsin, based in New York City. Her work is known for its synthesis of metalsmith and high fashion and has been featured at the Rockefeller Center, V&A Museum and the London Barbican. Velez was a semi-finalist for the 2024 LVMH prize and named the CFDA's 2022 Emerging Designer of the Year. In 2025 Velez designed the costumes for The National Ballet of Canada.

Described by Vogue as "explosive and aggressive", Velez's work has been inspired by the craftsmanship of the American Rust Belt as well as reactionary, counter-cultural aesthetics. Themes in her work include deconstruction, "anti-heroines", and alternative construction methods, which include salvaged materials. Velez coins her visual identity as "aggressively delicate" and "anti-fragile", frequently asserting the urgency of "transgressive art".

== Early life and education ==
Of Puerto Rican heritage and raised in Milwaukee, Wisconsin, Velez claims in recent interviews that the "industrial" nature of her "nontraditional upbringing" as the only child to a single mother who is a ship's captain on the Great Lakes influenced her current artistic identity, which she says draws heavily on "the relationship between femininity and force". With a beginning interest in design from early childhood, the first documentation of her developments appear in local TV news as a teenager in 2010. In 2023 Velez was profiled in The New York Times detailing her difficulties in growing a brand without private wealth or industry connections.

Velez studied at Parsons Paris from 2013 to 2015 and graduated from Parsons School of Design in 2018 with a BFA in fashion design and minor in creative entrepreneurship. Additionally in 2020 she received a Graduate Diploma in fashion design from Central Saint Martins in London. Her BFA thesis collection was shown at VFILES Season 10 Runway, and London Fashion Week, as a guest of the Swedish Fashion Council.

== Career ==
In 2019 Velez's work was exhibited as a Teen Vogue 2019 Generation Next designer curated by Editor in Chief of Vogue Anna Wintour. Her work has received coverage in Business of Fashion, Women's Wear Daily, WGSN, and other publications.

In February, 2021, Elena Velez Industries Inc. was founded with investment support from venture capital firms Gener8tor, and CSA Partners.

Velez has dressed celebrities including Courtney Love, Ye, Taylor Swift, John Kiriakou, Angela Nikolau & Ivan Beerkus, Solange Knowles, Ethel Cain, Julia Fox, Charli XCX, Eartheater, Doja Cat, Grimes, Anna Delvey, Teyana Taylor, Tinashe, Jenna Ortega, and others.

In 2022, Velez won American Emerging Designer of the Year at the CFDA Fashion Awards. In March 2023, she was inducted as a member of the Council of Fashion Designers of America.

Velez attended the 2023 Met Gala as a guest of Balenciaga. For the occasion, she created a crackle medium screen print ink-gown for the artist Sasha Gordon as a nod to Gordon's painting career.

In February 2024 Velez hosted controversial EVSALON001, which drew on "antiheroic American female archetypes" from Margaret Mitchell's Gone With The Wind. The Washington Post criticized the salon as "problematic" and "dangerously cheesy" and alleged that Velez "aligns herself with the unsavory flavor of a tendentious downtown New York crowd, whose podcasters, media personalities and fashion and art-adjacent figures rose to prominence under the aegis of 'Dimes Square'". The salon garnered Velez the nickname of "Fashion's first post-woke designer" according to The Free Press.

Velez collaborated with digital art collective Remilia Corporation in 2025. Velez was quoted in The New Yorker commenting on heterodox downtown event space Sovereign House.

In 2025, Velez collaborated with subscription platform and adult content hosting website OnlyFans.

For her Fall Winter 2026 show, Velez received highly polarizing reviews for collaborating with controversial streamer Clavicular on his runway debut. The event also featured Pariah the Doll. Velez is quoted in Vogue Business asserting that alignments are not "moral attachment[s]" but "artifacts, not endorsements". Fashion industry critics, while acknowledging the validity of the trend of "hypermasculinity" and "bodymaxxing", claim she "platforms problematic ideologies."

In her Spring Summer 2027 show as part of the New York Fashion Week, Velez had ex-CIA officer and whistleblower John Kiriakou walk down the runway with a book about Watergate tucked under his arm.

== Awards ==
- Inaugural Fellow of the Jayaram Law Creative Legal Alliance, New York, 2026
- Recipient, Joe & Clara Tsai Foundation; 2025 Revitalize Brooklyn Grant, New York, 2025
- Semi Finalist, LVMH Prize, Paris, 2024
- The Dazed 100 List curated by Ib Kamara, 2023
- Semi Finalist, Emerging Designer/ Brand of the Year; Latin American Fashion Awards, 2023
- 50 Women In Power list by WWD, New York, 2023
- Elle Magazine's 2023 Women of Impact Award, WA D.C., 2023
- Winner, Fashion Trust US Sustainability Award, New York 2023
- Winner, Best Emerging Designer; CFDA Fashion Awards, New York, 2022
- Winner, CFDA Vogue Fashion Fund Award, New York, 2022
- Recipient, IMG Fashion Alliance Grant, New York, 2022
- Winner, Teen Vogue Generation Next, New York, 2019
- Winner, VFILES Season 10 Runway, New York, 2018
- Finalist, Swedish Fashion Council CTF Award, London 2018

== Museum Shows & Acquisitions ==
- Brusk Museum Bruges: High Tide: Of Humanity and the Sea, Through Fashion and Art, Belgium, 2026
- Rockefeller Center: America250, New York City, 2026
- Barbican Centre: Dirty Looks, London 2025
- V&A Museum: Taylor Swift | Songbook Trail, London 2024
- Pratt Manhattan Gallery: The New Village: Ten Years of New York Fashion, New York 2024
- Abrons Art Center: Objects of Permanence, New York 2023
- The Museum at FIT: ¡Moda Hoy! Latin American and Latinx Fashion Design Today, New York 2023

== New York Fashion Week Collections ==
- YR009 - SMITE, Sep 12. 2026
- YR008 - MANUS MAXXIMA, Feb 12. 2026
- YR007 - Badland, Sep 16. 2025
- YR006 - Leech, Feb 9. 2025
- YR005 - La Pucelle, Sep 10. 2024
- YR004 - The Longhouse, Sep. 2023
- YR003 - How's My Driving?, Feb. 2023
- YR002 - In Glass, Sep. 2022
- YR001 - Maidenhood And Its Labors, Feb. 2022
- YR000 - Rinascita, Sep. 2021
- Homecoming, 2019
- Vessel, 2019
- _And Carry On, 2018

== Salons ==
- EVSALON001: Tomorrow is Another Day, Feb. 2024
