= Sasha Gordon =

American painter (born 1998)

- Born: 1998 (age 27–28); Somers, New York, U.S.
- Education: Rhode Island School of Design
- Known for: Painting

Sasha Gordon (born 1998) is an American figurative painter who lives and works in New York City. She is known for hyperrealistic self-portraits set within surreal narratives and uncanny scenes. Complicating the genre of self-portraiture and engaging the canon of art history, Gordon’s work expresses a range of psychological experience.

== Early life and education ==
Sasha Gordon was born in 1998 to a Polish American Jewish father and a Korean mother. She grew up in Somers, New York and expressed interest in art at an early age. When she was four, she was encouraged by her mother who set up a table with crayons, colored pencils, and paper. At five, she began taking classes at a local art center. At ten, a local newspaper published a photo of Gordon painting an accurate full-scale replica of Vincent van Gogh's The Starry Night. Gordon says that she was doing a lot of master copies at this time, such as paintings after Claude Monet’s water lilies and Georgia O’Keeffe’s poppy flowers. During these early years, she spent hours after school painting rather than doing her homework. She describes her adolescent years as "sheltered" and says that she had a "subconscious curiosity" about the medium of paint which motivated her to hone her painting skills on her own, without a local art scene to turn to.

Gordon entered the Rhode Island School of Design (RISD) in 2016. There she soon experimented with hyperrealistic paintings of the human face. During her sophomore year, she began thinking more conceptually and shifted towards painting self-portraits. Early examples of her conceptual self-portraits from this period include I Left The Night The Dummy Crashed The Gordon’s Volvo (2017) and Peel (2017). Gordon graduated from RISD in 2020.

== Career ==
While she was a student at RISD, Gordon's work caught the attention of gallerist Matthew Brown. Brown included one of Gordon's paintings in a group show at his LA gallery in 2019 while she was still a RISD student, and the following year gave Gordon her first solo show, which drew favorable reviews from critics and led to her first museum acquisition by ICA Miami.

Over the following years, Gordon's career gained notable momentum, leading ArtNet to describe her early success as "head-spinning". In 2022, one of her large self-portraits was shown at the Rudolph Tegners Museum outside Copenhagen alongside older established artists like Cecily Brown and Jenna Gribbon. New American Paintings named Gordon's painting My Friend Will Be Me their #1 2022 "Painting We Just Can't Stop Thinking About". Gordon's profile in Cultured Magazine was one of the publication's ten "Most Read" stories in 2022.

In 2023, her painting Campfire was included in the Hammer Museum’s show Together in Time. Also that year, visitors to the Baltimore Museum of Art voted Gordon's painting Mood Ring as one of their top five "most loved" works in the museum. In December 2023, her first solo museum show opened at the Institute of Contemporary Art, Miami, coinciding with Art Basel. ArtNet called the opening of the show "highly anticipated" and noted that Gordon is "among the most sought-after young artists". Gordon attended the 2023 Met Gala as a guest of Balenciaga, wearing an outfit designed for the occasion by Elena Velez.

In 2024, The New York Times called Gordon one of the "artists redefining portraits of the human body for a more inclusive age". She debuted several new paintings in a show at the Jewish Museum (Manhattan) in May 2024. In September 2024, she became the youngest artist to join the roster of David Zwirner Gallery and, according the ArtNews, among the youngest of any artist to be represented by a gallery of that stature. David Zwirner, after seeing Gordon's work for the first time at her 2023 Institute of Contemporary Art (Miami) show, said "I felt that I was in the presence of an artist of our time and for our time, an entirely new voice, a painter who is pushing the genre into uncharted territory."

Gordon's first show with David Zwirner Gallery opened in September 2025 at Zwirner's New York City gallery. A line stretched around the block the opening night, and the gallery stated that they hadn't seen such a crowd since their last exhibition with Yayoi Kusama.

Time Magazine named Gordon to their 2026 Time 100 Next list of the world's 100 most influential rising stars across all fields of culture, sports, business, and advocacy.

Gordon lives in Brooklyn, New York and works from her studio there.

== Work ==
Art Basel's Stories publication said of Gordon's work ahead of her first museum solo show

Contradicting painting traditions that positioned women as objects to be consumed, the female forms in these works are object and protagonist, subject and voyeur – unapologetic in their rage.

Gordon has stated that she often begins painting in the evening and works through the night when she can avoid distractions.

== Influences ==
Gordon has cited as references Liu Wei, Kerry James Marshall, Nicole Eisenman, Dana Shutz, Lisa Yuskavage, Tetsuya Ishida, and Cheyenne Julien.

For some of her work, Gordon draws inspiration from renaissance painters such as Botticelli, Titian, and Caravaggio. She credits Jennifer Packer, one of her professors at RISD, with encouraging the study of renaissance painting.

== Selected works ==
=== Campfire, 2021 ===
Oil and molding paste on canvas, 6 by 9 feet (1.8 m × 2.7 m). In this painting, Gordon presents herself in many forms and a range of affective states. Its cool tones and rich blues are used to create a surreal and magical feeling. While some renditions of the artist frolic in the water, another proudly chops wood besides several smoking and drinking. The painting offered Gordon the ability to reflect and heal from her experiences "as a lesbian Asian girl growing up in a white, upper-middle-class New York suburb."

=== Concert Mistress, 2021 ===
Oil on canvas, 72 by 48 by 2.25 inches (183 cm × 122 cm × 6 cm). This large self-portrait shows Gordon grinning wildly while playing a violin, an unseen viewer peering through the window. Playing with the model minority stereotype, Gordon pushes viewers to question their biases and to address the pressures of the white gaze and the stereotypes it engenders.

=== The Archer (diptych), 2021 ===
Oil on canvas, 3 by 6 feet (0.91 m × 1.83 m). These pieces face each other across a room – one self-portrait draws her arrow toward the opposing painting, where another resignedly and anxiously offers a thumbs up, apple on head and missed arrows at her feet. At war with herself and "catching viewers in the crossfire," Gordon implicates those gazing upon her body.

=== I Left the Night the Dummy Crashed the Gordon's Volvo, 2017 ===
Oil on canvas, 5 by 6 feet (1.5 m × 1.8 m). This work is one of the most pronounced of a series that Gordon executed in 2017 as she transitioned from her early hyperrealistic work to her signature works featuring her body. This series of transitional works showed Gordon as a latex dummy. Asked about this painting in a 2018 interview, Gordon stated:

In my recent work, I have this figure, sometimes multiple, in a black, latex, plastic suit that represents my anxiety and depression, personifying it. A large part of my anxiety is my fear of death...In this piece, I am faking my death, to escape reality.

== Public collections ==
- Hugger (2023), Whitney Museum New York, New York
- Princess (2023), Dallas Museum of Art, Dallas, TX
- My Friends Will Be Me (2022), Brooklyn Museum, Brooklyn, New York
- Almost a Very Rare Thing (2022), Cantor Arts Center at Stanford University, Stanford, California
- Mood Ring (2022) Baltimore Museum of Art, Baltimore, Maryland
- Sore Loser (2022) Ogunquit Museum of American Art, Ogunquit, Maine
- Campfire (2021), Hammer Museum, Los Angeles, California
- Mirror (2021), The Museum of Fine Arts Houston, Houston, Texas
- Concert Mistress (2021), ICA Miami, Miami, Florida
- Museu de Arte Contemporânea de Serralves, Porto, Portugal
- Los Angeles County Museum of Art, Los Angeles, California
- Crystal Bridges Museum of American Art Bentonville, Arkansas

== See also ==
- Yue Minjun
