= Si On =

- Education: Mokwon University; Kyoto City University of Arts

Korean name
- Hangul: 박현경
- RR: Bak Hyeongyeong
- MR: Pak Hyŏn'gyŏng
- Website: hyongyon.com

Si On formerly known as Hyon Gyon (born Hyun Kyoung Park, June 16, 1979), is a painter who received her doctorate from the Kyoto City University of Arts. She is best known for her use of traditional Korean shamanistic imagery in her large-scale paintings. Before she earned her master's degree and doctorate, Hyon Gyon earned her BFA from Mokwon University in Daejeon, South Korea. She now lives in Poland.

== Early life ==
Hyon Gyon became involved in the world of fine arts late in life. Post-graduation, the artist moved to Japan, where she enrolled in the Kyoto City University of Arts. Gyon noted in an interview with Kyoto Art Box, "While in university, I got more interested in creating art works." In an interview with Guernica Magazine, the artist described her early relationship with colorful, shiny fabrics. As a child, she drew on them and burned holes in them with a lighter. Si On's fascination with melting textiles was later reflected in the sculptural elements of her painted works, which collage textiles like satin and sateen that are melded with an iron.

Si On's work engaging with shamanistic ideas and imagery began after her grandmother's death. A family member called a shaman to perform a gut ritual at their home to exorcise the remnants of her grandmother's life and recent funeral. In an interview, Gyon described her interest in purification, as well as the manifestation of negative emotions such as sadness, grief, and agony after the event, saying, "What I experienced was the process of purification of the negative emotions that accompany human tragedies, a topic I had been consistently interested in. The ritual was an endless cycle of creation and extinction in which everything—sadness, joy, anger, attachment, love, hatred, obsession with life, fear of death, desire, pain—was swallowed up. The experience had a profound effect on me as both an individual and an artist. I felt that I had at last found my subject matter."

== Artistic themes and imagery ==
Several re-occurring themes and images are visible in Hyon Gyon's shamanistic painting:

Incarnations: Referred to as 'incarnations', the figures in Hyon Gyon's paintings represent metaphorical or otherworldly beings that take a temporary form. As manifestations of the intangible, the artist also relates them to the role of the shaman in gut who intercedes in a liminal space.

Hair: The artist uses hair as a signifier of life, citing it as a part of the body which continues to grow after death that was considered to hold spiritual power. The messy black hair which dominated her painting series in 2013 reflects struggle and turbulence, as the color indicates the possibility of rebirth in death.

Stigma: Hyon Gyon's interest in shamanism also lies in the social conflict around shamans. The artist has commented on her interest in the ordinary lives of shamans, who are often shunned but are called upon during climactic events, such as funerals. The artist describes the shamanistic role as providing solace through suffering, which creates empathy.

Catharsis: The artist has also referred to the catharsis she experienced after a shamanistic ceremony. Two elements that she refers to in her work are chaos, as well as the ripping apart of barriers and limitations, which are also echoed by the imagery of tearing clothing in her 'Untitled'.

== Selected works ==
=== Solo exhibitions ===
2020

- “Doomsday”, Mori Art Museum (Project Room), Tokyo, 2020

2019

- “Hyon Gyon”, Parasol Unit Foundation for Contemporary Art, London, UK

2017

- Cruel World, Ben Brown Fine Arts, Hong Kong (2017)

2016

- Emotional Drought, Shin Gallery, New York, United States (2016)

2015

- Hyon Gyon and the Factory Chashama, New York, United States (2015)
- No-Mad Nomad, Pioneer Works, New York, United States (2015)

2014

- Volta, New York, New York, United States (2014)

2013

- Phantoms on Parade, Shin Gallery, New York, United States (2013)
- All Night Haps, HAPS, Kyoto, Japan (2013)

2012

- The Incarnation of the World, Gallery Golmok, Seoul, South Korea (2012)

2011

- New incubation3, On a Knife Edge, Kyoto Art Center, Kyoto, Japan (2011)

2010

- Giragira, g³ gallery, Tokyo, Japan (2010)
- Tamahuri, g³ gallery, Tokyo, Japan (2010)

2009

- Iyoiyo, Gallery EXIT, Hong Kong2008 "iyoiyo", Magical Art Room, Tokyo, Japan (2009)
- TWS-Emerging 099, “Awesome,” Tokyo Wonder Site Hongo, Tokyo, Japan (2009)
- Tokyo Wonder wall, Tokyo Metropolitan Government, Tokyo, Japan (2009)

2008

- Iyoiyo, Magical Art Room, Tokyo, Japan (2008)
- TWS- Emerging 099, Awesome Tokyo Wonder Site Hongo, Tokyo Japan (2008)
- Tokyo Wonder Wall, Tokyo Metropolitan Government Tokyo, Japan (2008)

=== Group exhibitions ===
2019

- “Farba znaczy krew”, Muzeum Sztuki Nowoczesnej, Warsaw, Poland,
- “Trip” (in collaboration with Jakub Julian Ziolkowski),
- BWA Wroclaw Galleries of Contemporary Art, Wroclaw, Poland

2018

- “Wielcy sarmaci tego kraju/wielkie sarmatki tego kraju”, BWA Tarnów, Poland
- “Holy Nothing” (in collaboration with Jakub Julian Ziolkowski), Ujazdowski Castle Centre for Contemporary Art, Warsaw, Poland
- “Sue Coe, Eliza Douglas, Joseph Geagan, Hyon Gyon”, James Fuentes Gallery, New York, U.S.A.

2017

- Culture city of East Asia, Tokyo and Kyoto, Japan (2017)
- The World is a Stage, but the Play is Badly Cast, Batu Museum, New York, United States (2017)
- Naturalia, Paul Kasmin, New York, United States (2017)

2016

- Art for Art's Sake: Selections from the Frederick R. Welsman Art Foundation, Carneige Art Museum, California, United States (2016)
- BEYOND SECRETARY, Mark Borghi Gallery, United States (2016)

2015

- The Brooklyn Artists Ball, Brooklyn Museum, New York, United States (2015)
- Veni, Vidi, Vici, Shin Gallery, New York, United States (2015)

2013

- KAWAI CAMP!, Contemporary Art Meeting Point, Athens, Greece (2013)
- New Generation, Able Fine Art New York Gallery, New York, United States (2013)
- Kyoto Artist Meeting 2013, Antenna Media, Tokyo, Japan (2013)
- Open Studio 2013, Muko Studio, Kyoto, Japan (2013)
- Kyoto Studio, @KCUA, Kyoto, Japan (2013)

2012

- Phantoms of Asia, Asian Art Museum, San Francisco, California (2012)
- Transmit Program#3, Mètis, @KCUA, Kyoto, Japan (2012)

2011

- TOKYO FRONTLINE, 3331 Arts Chiyoda, Tokyo, Japan (2011)

2010

- Tokyo Wonder Wall 10th Anniversary, Museum of Contemporary Art, Japan (2010)

2009

- WAKUWAKU JOBAN-KASHIWA PROJECT, TSCA Kashiwa, Chiba, Japan (2009)
- Neoneo Part2[girl], Neoneo Girls Opening Themselves Iwato/Takahashi | collection/Tokyo, Japan (2009)
- Pica3, Art Court Gallery Osaka, Japan (2009)

2008

- NEW BEGINNING - The show must go on!, Magical Art Room, Tokyo, Japan (2008)

2007

- Worm Hole Episode 7, Magical Art Room, Tokyo, Japan (2007)
- Tokyo Wonder Wall, Museum of Contemporary Tokyo, Japan (2007)
- Hello, Chelsea 2007, PS35 gallery, New York, New York (2007)
- CX展, Caso, Osaka, Japan Art Award Tokyo, Japan (2007)
- Brilliant Works, Art Zone, Kyoto, Japan (2007)

2006

- Art Jam2006, the Museum of Kyoto, Japan (2006)
- Art Camp Gallery, Yamaguchi Kunst-Bau, Osaka, Japan (2006)

=== Public collections ===
- Brooklyn Museum, New York, United States
- The High Museum of Art, Atlanta, United States
- Takahashi Collection, Tokyo, Japan
- Kyoto City University of Arts, Kyoto, Japan
- Kyoto Bank, Kyoto, Japan
- Kyoto National Museum, Kyoto, Japan
- Frederick R. Weisman Art Foundation, Los Angeles, United States

=== Fellowships and awards ===
- Kyoto Cultural Award (2014)
- Kyoto City Special Bounty of Art and Cultural from April 2012 to March 2013 (2012)
- Asao Kato International Scholarship from April 2006 to March 2008 (2006)
- Tokyo Wonder Wall Competition Prize, 2014
