= Dorit Chrysler =

Austrian composer and sound artist

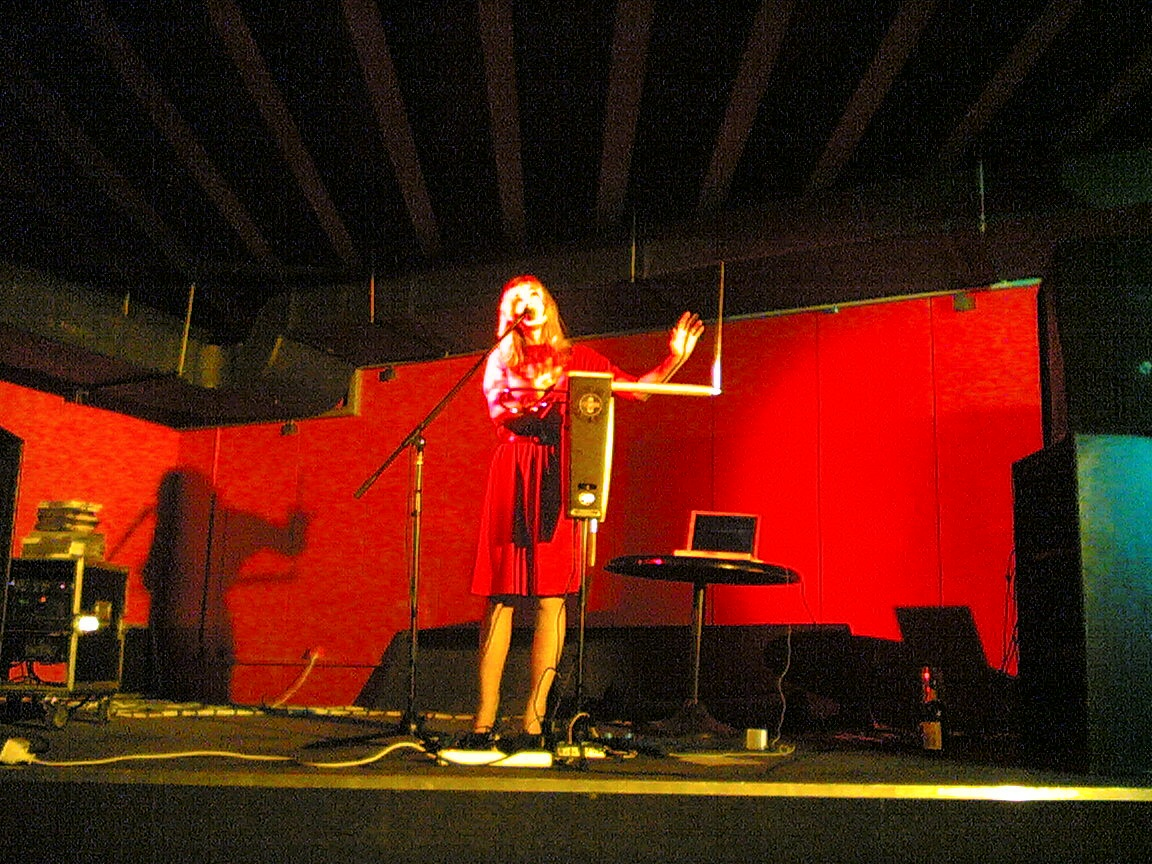
Chrysler in 2006

Dorit Chrysler, born Dorit Kreisler, is an Austrian-born composer, thereminist and sound artist. She has written music for films, TV and video art featured in museum collections such as the Guggenheim and MoMA. Chrysler co-founded the New York Theremin Society and developed a curriculum for Learning How To Play The Theremin when establishing the first international school of theremin "KidCoolThereminSchool". She has performed with the San Francisco Symphony Orchestra and is featured on the soundtrack of the HBO documentary Going Clear. Chrysler has written the soundtrack for "M - A City Hunts a Murderer" by David Schalko and is the founder of "Dame Electric Festival." She has curated Theremin100, a compilation featuring 50 international Theremin Artists to commemorate the Centennial of the Theremin in 2020. Her works have been commissioned for MoMA, Steirische Herbst, the Venice Biennale etc. Promoting the use of theremin in contemporary music styles, she has collaborated with Trentemøller, Lene Lovich, Cluster, Philippe Quesne, Carsten Nicolai, Elliott Sharp, Jesper Just and many more. She has performed at Lincoln Center, Palais Tokyo, the Louisiana Museum, Coachella, Roskilde Festival, Konzerthaus in Vienna and CBGB.

== Biography ==
Chrysler was born in Graz and spent her youth in Austria. She sang with the children's choir of the Opera Graz as a child, and studied musicology at the University of Vienna. Chrysler moved to New York, where she worked as a musician, founding the band Halcion. She has collaborated with artists including Elliott Sharp, Swans, Anders Trentemoeller, ADULT., Max Romeo, Cluster, Chicks on Speed, and Baby Dee.

She has performed and recorded as a solo artist since 2000. During this time she discovered the theremin. She has since performed worldwide, including Brazil, Australia, Japan, China and Russia. In 2005, Chrysler and Suzanne Fiol co-founded the New York Theremin Society.

Chrysler's musical style consists of electronic pop music, cinematic and experimental compositions. Wall Street Journal hailed her a "Futuristic Lotte Lenya". Paper magazine described her as the love child of Marianne Faithfull and Nikola Tesla, "with Jane Birkin as the nanny and Björk as the wayward Girl Scout leader." Her music has been used in TV, movies and video art, including "Riget" by Lars von Trier and "A Vicious Undertow" by Jesper Just. She is the producer and curator of the 10 piece Theremin Orchestra at Walt Disney Concert Hall in Los Angeles, CA. Recipient of permanent residency at Pioneer Works, Center for Art & Innovation and a grant of the Knightsbridge Foundation.

== Discography ==
- Schlager on Parade - Plastiktray (2000)
- Best of Dorit Chrysler - Plag Dich Nicht (2004)
- Tiny Thrills - Plag Dich Nicht (2005)
- Dorit Chrysler / Mico / Monotekktoni / Iris - 4 Women No Cry, Vol. 2 - Monika Enterprise (2006)
- Sea of Negligence - Prurience Factory (2011)
- Avalanche - In My Room (2012)
- Chinatown Evil / Sci-Fi - Bubutz Records (2012)
- A Happy Place - Self released (2019)
- Theremin 100 - NY Theremin Society (2020)
