= Henrik Vibskov =

Danish fashion designer, artist, curator and musician

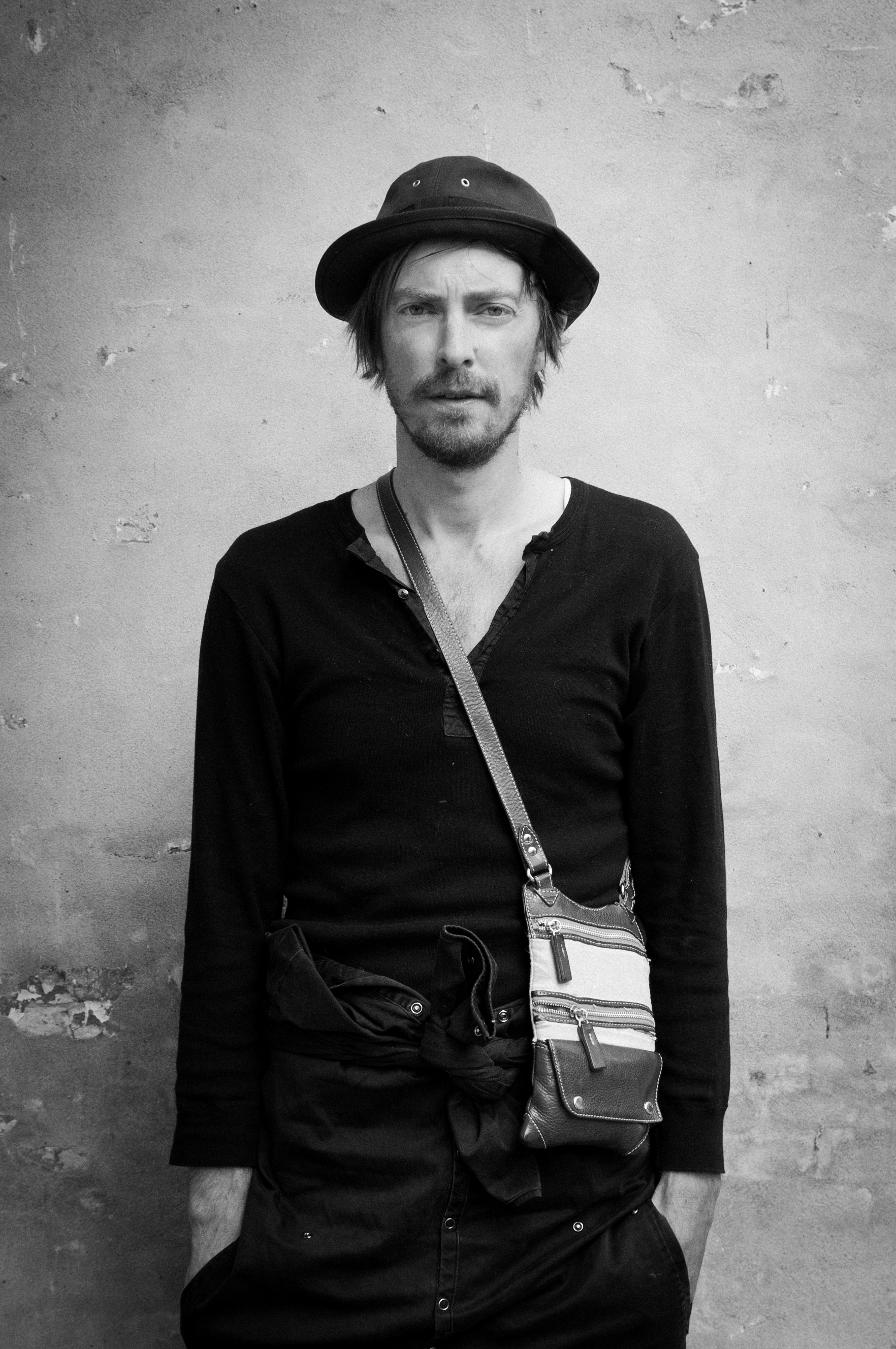
- Henrik Vibskov. Photo by Alastair Philip Wiper.
- Born: 1972 (age 53–54); Kjellerup, Jutland, Denmark
- Website: www.henrikvibskov.com

Henrik Vibskov (born 1972) is a Danish fashion designer, artist, curator and musician. Commonly associated with the fashion brand carrying the same name, his work is known for its enticing universes and crossover into other art forms. Working in the intersection between art and design, his work includes: art, installations, scenography, costumes, video, performance and exhibitions.

He graduated from the Central Saint Martins College of Art and Design in London in 2001. In 2021 he had his 20 years anniversary, with more than 40 fashion collections and numerous exhibitions presented, which has given him great recognition around the world. He has participated and exhibited in international designfairs, festivals and museums, including the MoMA in New York, the Palais de Tokyo in Paris, The 21st Century Museum of contemporary Art, Kanazawa, the ICA in London. He has also designed costumes for numerous operas and performances, including collaborations with Hotel Pro Forma, the Oslo Opera House, The Royal Swedish Ballet and the Brussels Opera House. Henrik Vibskov is currently Professor at the DSKD Design School Kolding and is frequently giving lectures in art institutions all over the world, such as Central Saint Martins in London, The IED in Madrid and the Antwerp Royal Academy of Fine Arts amongst other. As a musician he is best known for the collaborations with the Danish musicians Trentemøller, Mikael Simpson and Hess is More.

== Awards ==
- 2020 – Elle Style Award "Brand of the Year"
- 2016 – Thorvald Bindesbøll Medaljen
- 2011 – Torsten og Wanja Söderbergs pris
- 2009 – Award from The Danish Art Council for "The Solar Donkey Experiment" show
- 2008 – Danish Fashion Award in the category " Best Brand"
- 2000 – Beck´s Future Prize for filmen "The Monk"
