= Shin Gallery =

Coordinates: 40.717293°N 73.990515°W

Shin Gallery is an encyclopedic art gallery owned by Hong Gyu Shin. It specializes in modern and contemporary art, and hosts museum-quality exhibitions. It is located on the Lower East Side of Manhattan, New York, and it opened in 2013. In 2014, an immersive project space was opened next to the gallery. In 2017 Shin Gallery expanded to include three different gallery spaces on Orchard Street. Then in 2020, Shin Haus get launched, a program that aims to discover up-and-coming artists. The Gallery also specializes in rediscovering overlooked artists, traditionally marginalized due to their ethnicity and gender. Shin Gallery also works with a variety of venues including national heritage sites, hotels, and public spaces further demonstrating its international agenda.

== Background ==
Hong Gyu Shin was born in South Korea, and moved to New York as an international student at the age of 16. He was interested in art since his youth, he started collecting at 13, when he bought a Japanese ukiyo-e woodblock print by Utagawa Kuniyoshi. Shin graduated with a degree in art conservation and opened his gallery at the end of his second year in college. After getting to know the gallery scene in the city, he realized that New York needed a more inclusive space for both artists and visitors alike.

When he was only 23 years old (2013) Shin opened his gallery, at first displaying work by largely emerging Korean artists. His first exhibit showed the work of the Korean artist Hyon Gyon, including her monumental fabric pieces, made by melting traditional Korean garments together. Since then, the type of art that Shin displays has expanded, and he seeks out art that piques his curiosity.

The gallery features a collection of both established and emerging artists, unlike most galleries on the Lower East Side. A significant number of works by rediscovered women and self-taught artists of color can be seen as well. The collection features artworks that represent their era while still being aesthetically challenging in the present moment.

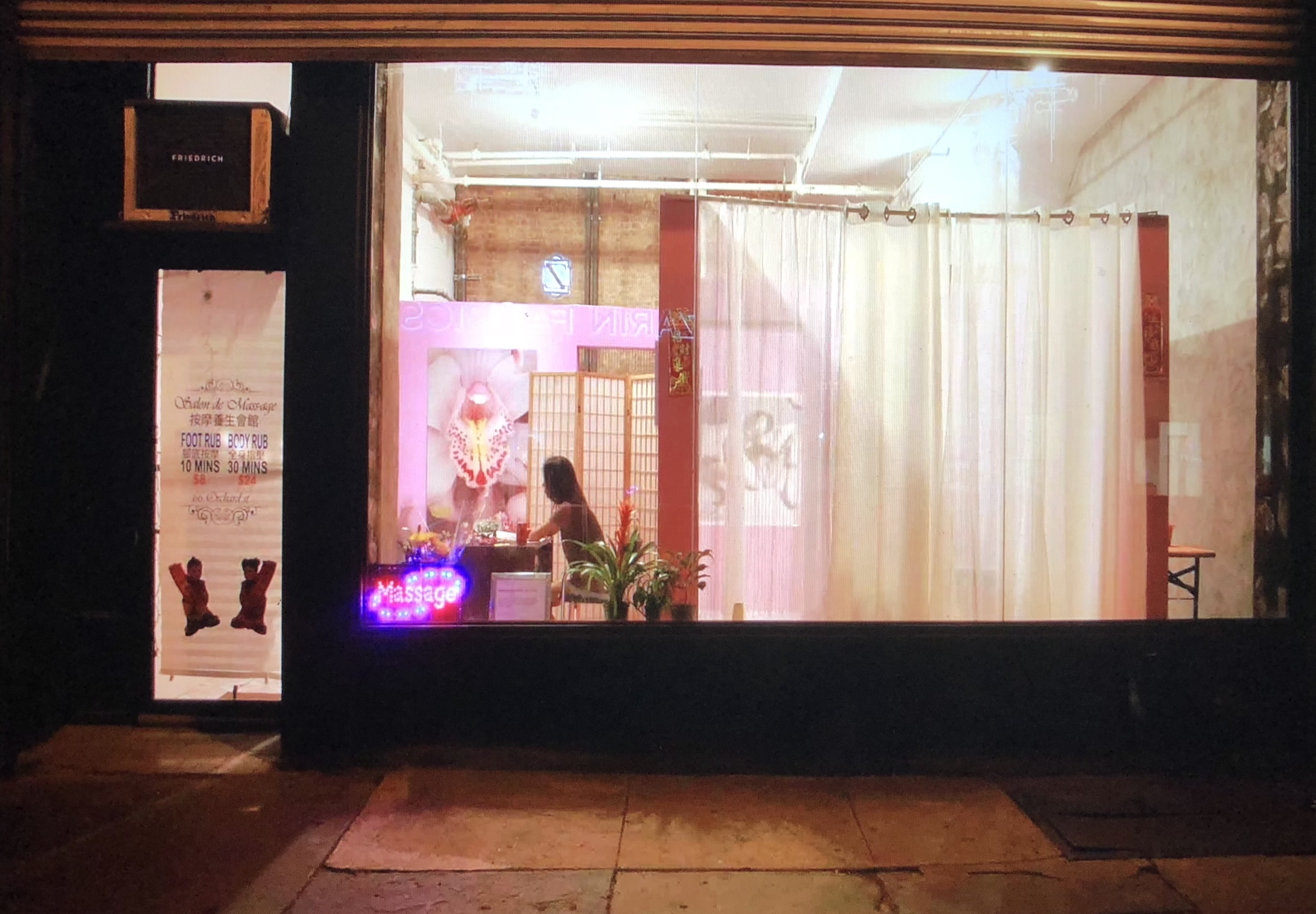
Street view of Salon de Mass-age at Shin Gallery, New York

== Notable exhibitions and projects ==
Nobuyoshi Araki & Rudolf Schwarzkogler: Salon de Mass-age

In 2015, the gallery exhibited a project called Salon de Mass-age in which the gallery's experimental space was transformed into a seedy exotic massage parlor to exhibit the grotesque works of Rudolf Schwarzkogler along with the erotic works of Nobuyoshi Araki. The exhibit paralleled the sexual connotation of a massage parlor with the explicit imagery present in Schwarzkogler and Araki’s works. In fact, the project drew attention on the Lower East Side because of its provocative nature and threats by nearby residents to sue the gallery for possibly lowering nearby property values with the project.

Martin Kippenberger & Sigmar Polke: Ja, Ja, Ja, Nee, Nee, Nee

The exhibition Martin Kippenberger & Sigmar Polke: Ja, Ja, Ja, Nee, Nee, Nee was displayed in 2015. The gallery space was a recreation of Kippenberger’s studio featuring objects the artists were fond of such as Mazda matches, Diebels Alt beer, Baldinette camera film, cigarettes, a favorite gray blazer, and magazine clippings. Commenting on the intense lifestyles of the visual artists Kippenberger and Polke, drug paraphernalia was scattered across the project space also referencing ready-made art. This exhibition was a peek into the worlds and minds of both Kippenberger and Polke, leaving the viewer enticed by the party-like environment, making it an extremely atypical exhibition.

John Graham, Willem de Kooning & Arshile Gorky: The Modernist Vanguards

John Graham, Willem de Kooning & Arshile Gorky: The Modernist Vanguards was a historic show on three European artists that became known as great American painters. The work of these famous artists are intrinsically tied to one another through their shared artistic values, philosophies, and personal relationships with each other. The show featured paintings and drawings from the three acclaimed modernist artists, highlighting the American style of art that emerged in the late 1920s. The show explored the dynamic between the three painters, demonstrating a close symbiotic relationship and exchange of artistic philosophies.

From David Drake to Bill Traylor: Where The Oven Bakes & The Pot Biles

Shin Gallery debuted its show entitled From David Drake to Bill Traylor: Where The Oven Bakes & The Pot Biles. This group exhibition displayed the works of African-American formerly enslaved and self-taught artists including David Drake, Bill Traylor, Clementine Hunter, and anonymous potters and doll-makers from the 19th century. Pieces were also displayed next to invoices of slave purchases, a powerful statement on the fragility between artist and object. The work of these unknown artists and skilled craftspeople revealed both spoken and unspoken truths of racial prejudice, tying in with the theme of the fair of putting the limelight on forgotten or underrepresented artists.

Lucio Fontana & Carla Prina: Spazio e Forma

Lucio Fontana & Carla Prina: Spazio e Forma marked Carla Prina’s largest U.S. show to date. Prina was shown at the Venice Biennale in 1942 and the Quadriennale Rome in 1955 yet was largely forgotten. She employed her use of color as armor, contrasting bright colors with undulating forms on canvas. Prina had a close artistic relationship with Lucio Fontana. Spazio e Forma explored the depths to which two Italian artists, male and female, celebrity and obscure, explored abstraction.

== Residency Program ==
The Wayne Nowack Artist Residency Program began in 2021 after Hong Gyu Shin acquired the Wayne Nowack collection including his 7-acre property, Lovearth, after the artist’s death in 2004. Every three months one artist is selected to go live on the estate and create a body of work. The goal of the program is to foster artist growth and creativity in an immersive and beautiful space in Upstate New York. Wayne Nowack (1923-2004) was an American artist that specialized in collages, paintings, and 3-D box constructions with found objects. He lived at Lovearth, located near Ithaca, for 50 years with his wife JeanCurtis. There they made art and began every day with “Our Hour,” which was an hour in the morning during which Wayne would read aloud to JeanCurtis while she knit. Wayne Nowack was represented by the American gallerist Allan Stone.

== SHIN HAUS ==
Shin Haus was launched in 2020 by Hong Gyu Shin with the goal of sharing cutting-edge art by young emerging artists to the art world on a monthly basis. Each month three to five artists are selected to share their work. The program aims to help collectors discover the work of these up-and-coming artists while giving the artists an opportunity to showcase their work at Shin Gallery. Past artists featured in the Shin Haus program include Amanda Baldwin, Bernadette Despujols, Talia Levitt, Egami Etsu, Yoora Lee, Ani Liu, Emma Safir, Shuyi Cao, Nate Plotkin, Ernesto Renda, and many others.

== Outsider Art and Self-taught Artists ==
Shin Gallery shines a spotlight on “outsider artists,” artists without formal training that often suffer from mental or physical ailments or social exclusion. Shin Gallery’s show of outsider artists included the works of Hawkins Bolden, Henry Darger, Purvis Young, Bill Traylor, Thornton Dial, and Minnie Evans. Shin hosted the Outsider Art Fair in 2021; it was the first in-person art fair since the pandemic started. In 2020 Shin Gallery also hosted the largest exhibition of Purvis Young, the self-taught American painter, in New York to date. Shin Gallery built an entire wall with his work as an homage to his studio in Florida. The Purvis Young exhibition was featured in Hyperallergic Magazine. The exhibition as a whole was also covered by The New York Times.
