= Elsparefonden =

The Danish Electricity Saving Trust (Elsparefonden) was an independent trust under the auspices of the Danish Ministry of Climate and Energy. The Trust worked to promote energy savings and a more efficient use of electricity.

The Trust was financed by a special electricity savings charge of DKK 0.006/kWh payable by households and the public sector. Total annual proceeds amount to approximately DKK 96 million.

It was replaced by the Centre for Energy Savings (Center for Energibesparelser).
