= Mikael Simpson =

Danish musician and composer (born 1974)

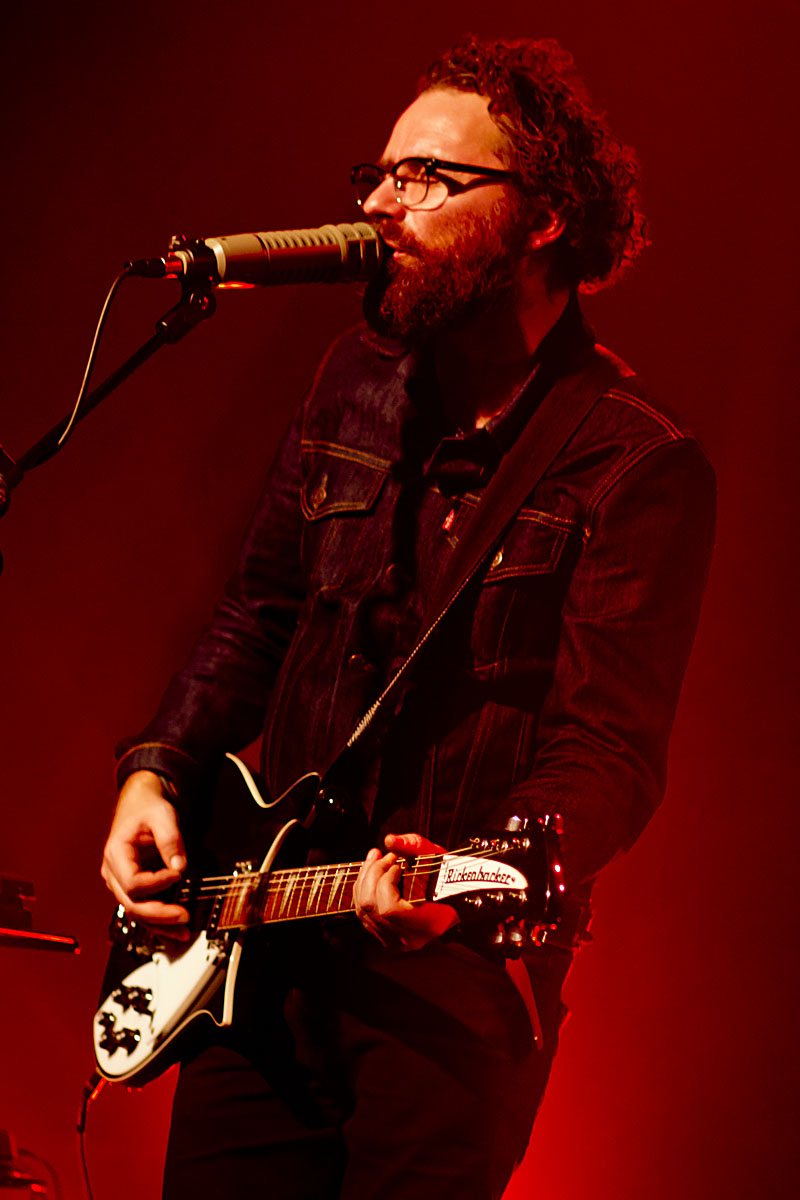
- Simpson performing in 2013

Background information
- Origin: Copenhagen, Denmark
- Genres: indietronica, dub, singer-songwriter
- Years active: 1995–present

Mikael Simpson (born 1974 in Holstebro) is a Danish songwriter, singer, film composer, musician and radio host. He began his musical career as a guitarist for the indie band Luksus, which disbanded in 2001. Since then, he has released four albums as a solo artist, earning him popularity in Denmark. He has performed live with Trentemøller on his Last Resort world tour and collaborates with Fritjhof Toksvig, dj Buda, Lulu Rouge and his band Sølvstorm.

== Discography ==
=== Albums ===
Studio albums

| Year | Album | Peak positions | Certification |
| Year | Album | DEN | Certification |
|---|---|---|---|
| 2002 | Os 2 + lidt ro 2002 | – | |
| 2004 | De ti skud | 20 | |
| 2006 | Stille & uroligt | 2 | Gold |
| 2009 | Slaar skaar | 3 | |
| 2011 | Noget lånt, noget blåt | 5 | |
| 2014 | Overspring (Samlet) | 12 | |

Live albums

| Year | Album | Peak positions |
| Year | Album | DEN |
|---|---|---|
| 2021 | Mikael Simpson & Sølvstorm: Live at Vega (with Sølvstorm) | 5 |

Compilation albums

| Year | Album | Peak positions |
| Year | Album | DEN |
|---|---|---|
| 2012 | Kompilation 2002–2012 | 15 |

Collaboration albums

| Year | Album | Peak positions |
| Year | Album | DEN |
|---|---|---|
| 2002 | Vi sidder bare her (Leth, Toksvig & Simpson) | 32 |

Remix albums

- 2005: B-sider, udtag og meget triste radiomix
- 2009: Slaar skaar – Udvalgte numre i andre versioner
- 2011: Udvalgte blaa

=== Singles ===
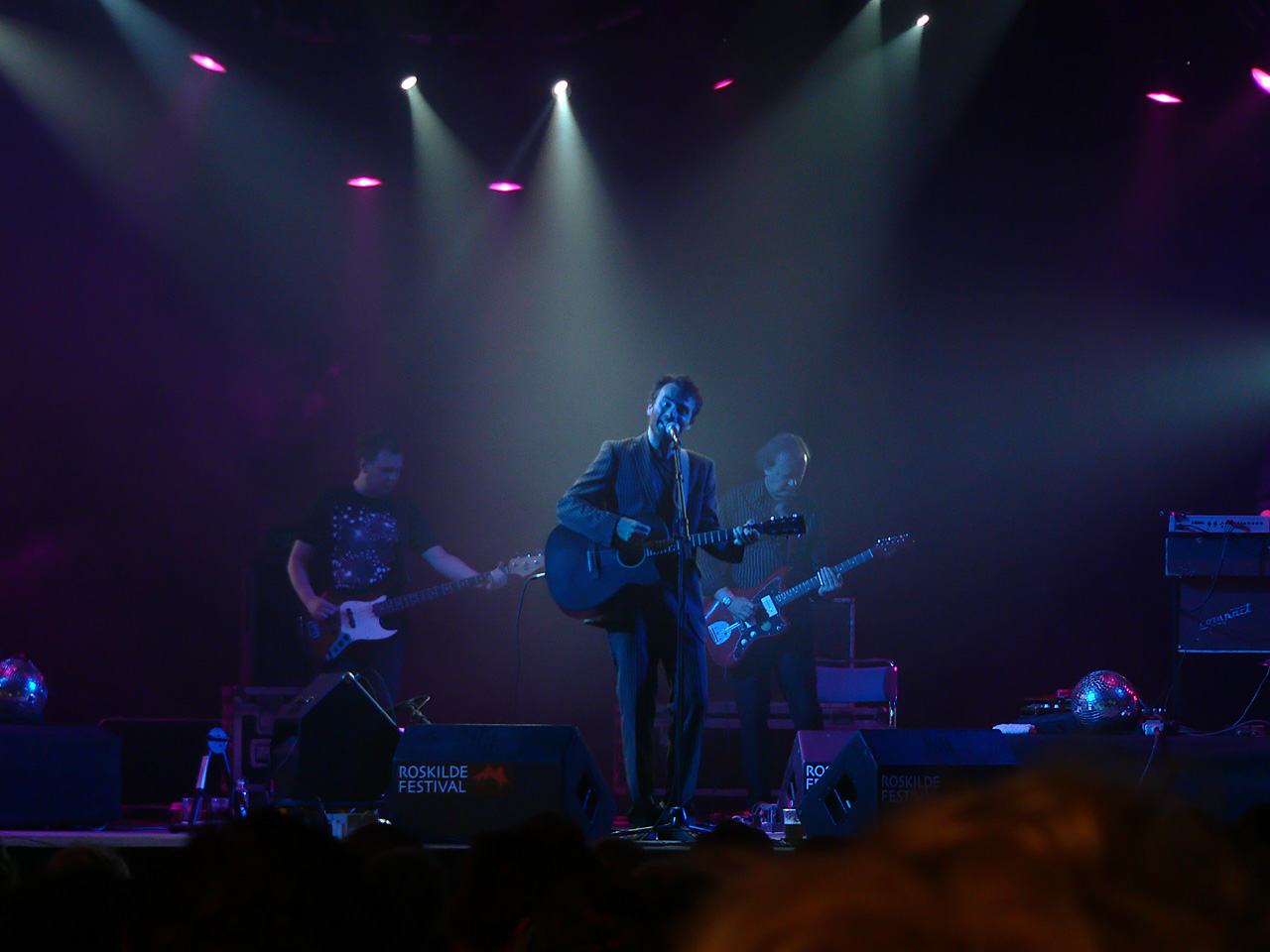
Simpson performing at Roskilde Festival in 2005

| Year | Single | Peak positions | Album |
| Year | Single | DEN | Album |
|---|---|---|---|
| 2009 | "Inden du falder i søvn" | 17 | Slaar skaar |

=== Others ===
- Composed the score for the documentary about a Danish refugee camp by Fenah Ahmed
- Composed the score for Rene Hjerter (Pure Hearts) with Jeppe Kaas
- Composed the score for gaven (The Gift) a film by Niels Graabøl
- Mikael Simpson also wrote the lyrics for Sweeter than sweet by Lulu Rouge and Moan by Trentemøller featuring Ane Trolle

=== Appearances ===
- Luksus – EP (1996)
- Luksus – Repertoire (1998)
- Lise Westzynthius – Heavy dream (2002)
- Various artist – Nordkraft (2005)
- Various artists – Andersens drømme (2005)
- Trentemøller – The Last Resort (2006)
- Various artists – Dmdk (2006)
- Various artists – Værsgo 2 (2006)
- Pet Shop Boys – Soddom (Trentemøller mix) (2006)
- Various artists – Stella polaris 2 (2006)
- Trentemøller – Cronicles (2007)
- Liv Lykke – Kai Normann Andersen (2007)
- Ekko -I know I Am Human (2007)
- Various artists – Frie børn leger bedst (2007)
- Various artists – Sound off Copenhagen (2008)
- Lulu Rouge – Bless You (2008)
- Trentemøller – Live at Roskilde (2008)
- Depeche Mode – Wrong (Trentemøller remix) (2009)

=== Remixes ===
- Nikolaj Nørlund – Verdensmester (with low ranger) (2001)
- Loveshop – Bellavista sol (with Ekko) (2003)
- Under Byen – Legesag (2003)
- Kashmir – Jewel Drop (2005)
- Ataf – Gade capitain (2006)
- Rhonda Harris – Waiting round to die (2006)
- Lulu Rouge – Bless you (2007)
- Trentemøller – Moan (2007)
- The crooked spoke – The one you left behind (2008)
- Trentemøller – Even though you're with another girl (2010)
- Sleep Party People – 10 Feet Up (2011)
- Panamah – Børn af natten (2013)
- Jacob Bro – Evening song (2013)
- Peter Sommer – Hvorfor løb vi (2013)

== Awards ==
- 2003 The "Steppeulven" Critics Award for hope of the year
- 2004 Danish Music Awards for songwriter of the year
- 2005 Best album the "Steppeulven" Critics Award
- 2005 Best alternative artist Danish National Radio p3 guld
- 2005 Composer of the year – The "Steppeulven" Critics Award
- 2006 Songwriter of the year Danish Music Awards
- 2006 Song of the year (for the song "VI 2") The "Steppeulven" Critics Award
- 2006 Main prize winner by Danish National Radio
- 2007 Best album – The "Steppeulven" Critics Award
- 2007 Singer of the year voted by the readers of music magazine Gaffa
- 2007 Bodil Film Award for best music with Jeppe Kaas for the film Rene Hjerter (Pure Hearts) directed by Kenneth Kaintz
- 2014 Radio innovation of the year at Prixradio
- 2024 Radiohost of the year at Prixradio (main prize)
