= List of Ivor Novello Award winners and nominees (1990s–2000s) =

The Ivor Novello Awards are held annually since 1956 by the Ivors Academy, formerly the British Academy of Songwriters, Composers and Authors, to recognize the excellence in songwriting and composing. The following list consists of all the winners and nominees of the awards by year, the winners are listed first and in bold followed by the nominees if present.

The awards and nominations are received by the songwriters of the nominated work, not the performers, unless they also have songwriting credits.

== 1990s ==
=== 1990 ===
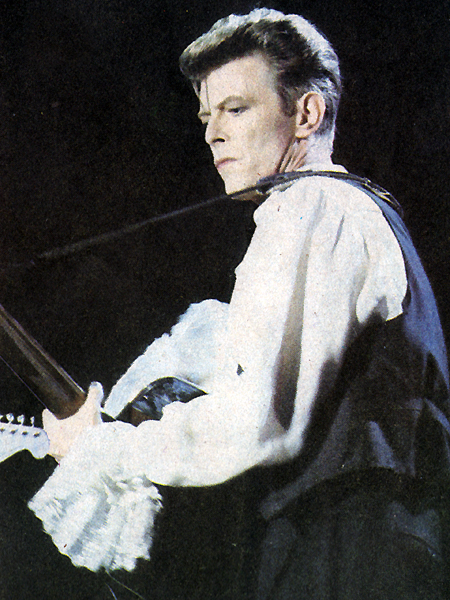
English singer-songwriter David Bowie received the award for Outstanding Contribution to British Music.

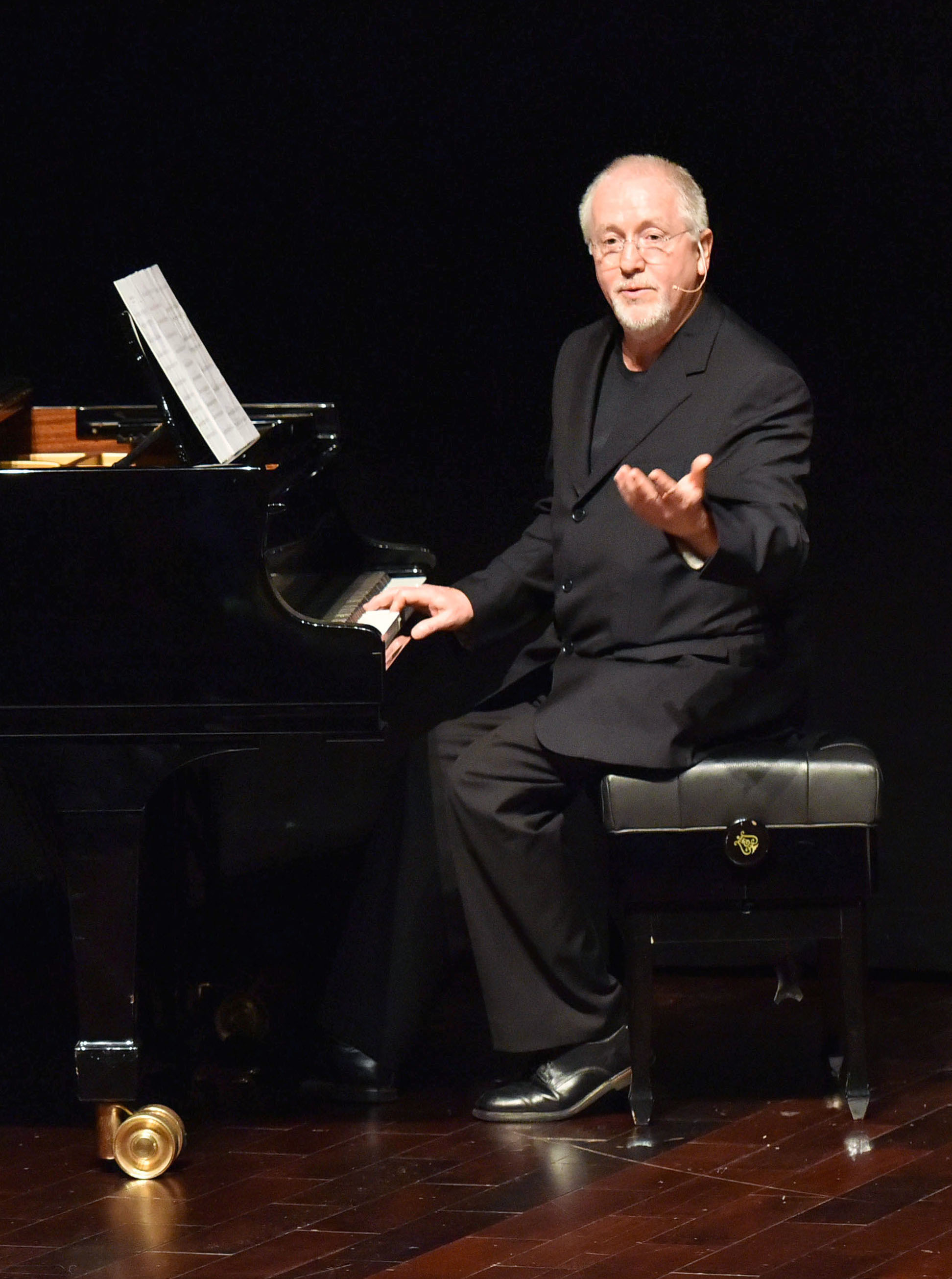
Scottish composer Patrick Doyle won Best Film Theme or Song for the song "Non Nobis, Domine" from Henry V.

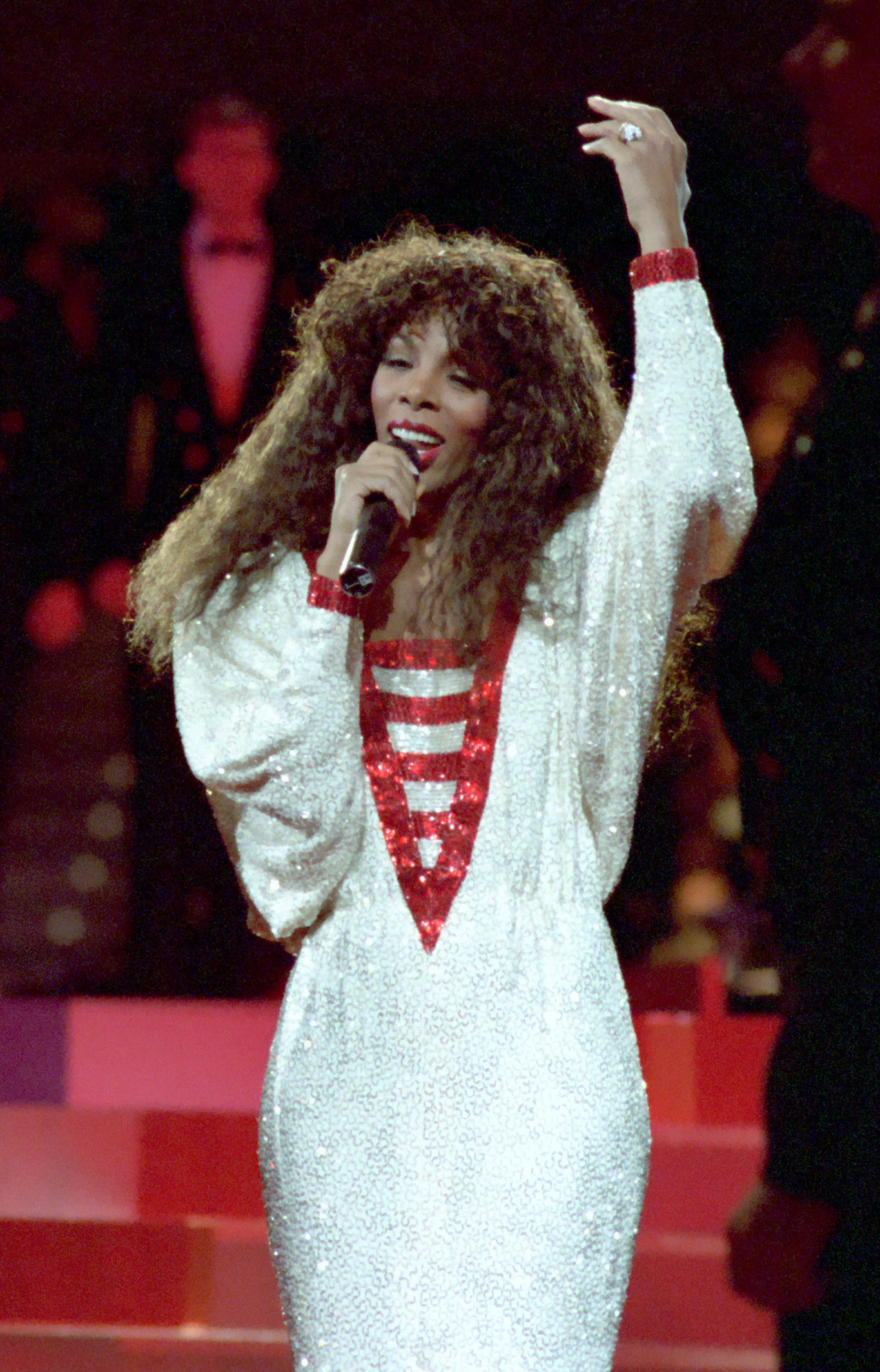
Donna Summer won the award for Most Performed Work along with Mike Stock, Matt Aitken and Pete Waterman for her song "This Time I Know It's for Real".

The 35th Ivor Novello Awards were presented on April 2, 1990, at the Grosvenor House, London.

Category	Recipient and nominees
Best British Musical	**Aspects of Love – Written by Don Black, Charles Hart and Andrew Lloyd Webber**
Best Contemporary Song	**"All Around the World" – Written by Lisa Stansfield, Ian Devaney and Andrew Morris; Performed by Lisa Stansfield**; "Back to Life (However Do You Want Me)" – Written by Jazzie B, Caron Wheeler, Nellee Hooper and Simon Law; Performed by Soul II Soul featuring Caron Wheeler; "She Drives Me Crazy" – Written by David Steele and Roland Gift; Performed by Fine Young Cannibals
Best Film Theme or Song	**"Non Nobis, Domine" from Henry V – Written by Patrick Doyle**; "Nothing Has Been Proved" from Scandal – Written by Neil Tennant and Chris Lowe; Performed by Dusty Springfield; "Travelling East" from Homeboy – Written by Eric Clapton and Michael Kamen; Performed by Eric Clapton
Best Song Musically and Lyrically	**"The Living Years" – Written by B.A. Robertson and Mike Rutherford; Performed by Mike + The Mechanics**; "Another Day in Paradise" – Written and performed by Phil Collins; "Room in Your Heart" – Written by Marcus Vere, Richard Darbyshire and Albert Hammond; Performed by Living in a Box
Best Theme from a TV/Radio Commercial	**"Abbey Endings" from Abbey National – Written by Lionel Bart**; "Big Day" from Maxwell House – Written by David Mindel; "Terry Keeps His Clips On" from Toshiba – Written by Viv Stanshall
Best Theme from a TV/Radio Production	**The Ruth Rendell Mysteries – Written by Brian Bennett**; Agatha Christie's Poirot – Written by Christopher Gunning; Sherlock Holmes – Written by Patrick Gowers
Outstanding Contribution to British Music	**David Bowie**
Outstanding Services to British Music	**The Kinks (Mick Avory, Dave Davies, Ray Davies, Ian Gibbons and Jim Rodford)**
Songwriters of the Year	**Mike Stock, Matt Aitken and Pete Waterman**
The Best Selling "A" Side	**"Too Many Broken Hearts" – Written by Mike Stock, Matt Aitken and Pete Waterman; Performed by Jason Donovan**; "Back to Life (However Do You Want Me)" – Written by Jazzie B, Caron Wheeler, Nellee Hooper and Simon Law; Performed by Soul II Soul featuring Caron Wheeler; "Something's Gotten Hold of My Heart" – Written by Roger Cook and Roger Greenaway; Performed by Marc Almond featuring Gene Pitney
The International Hit of the Year	**"She Drives Me Crazy" – Written by David Steele and Roland Gift; Performed by Fine Young Cannibals**; "Another Day in Paradise" – Written and performed by Phil Collins; "Buffalo Stance" – Written by Cameron McVey, Philip Ramacon, Neneh Cherry and Jamie Morgan; Performed by Neneh Cherry
The Jimmy Kennedy Award	**Herbert Kretzmer**
The Most Performed Work	**"This Time I Know It's for Real" – Written by Mike Stock, Matt Aitken, Pete Waterman and Donna Summer; Performed by Donna Summer**; "Something's Gotten Hold of My Heart" – Written by Roger Cook and Roger Greenaway; Performed by Marc Almond featuring Gene Pitney; "Too Many Broken Hearts" – Written by Mike Stock, Matt Aitken and Pete Waterman; Performed by Jason Donovan

=== 1991 ===
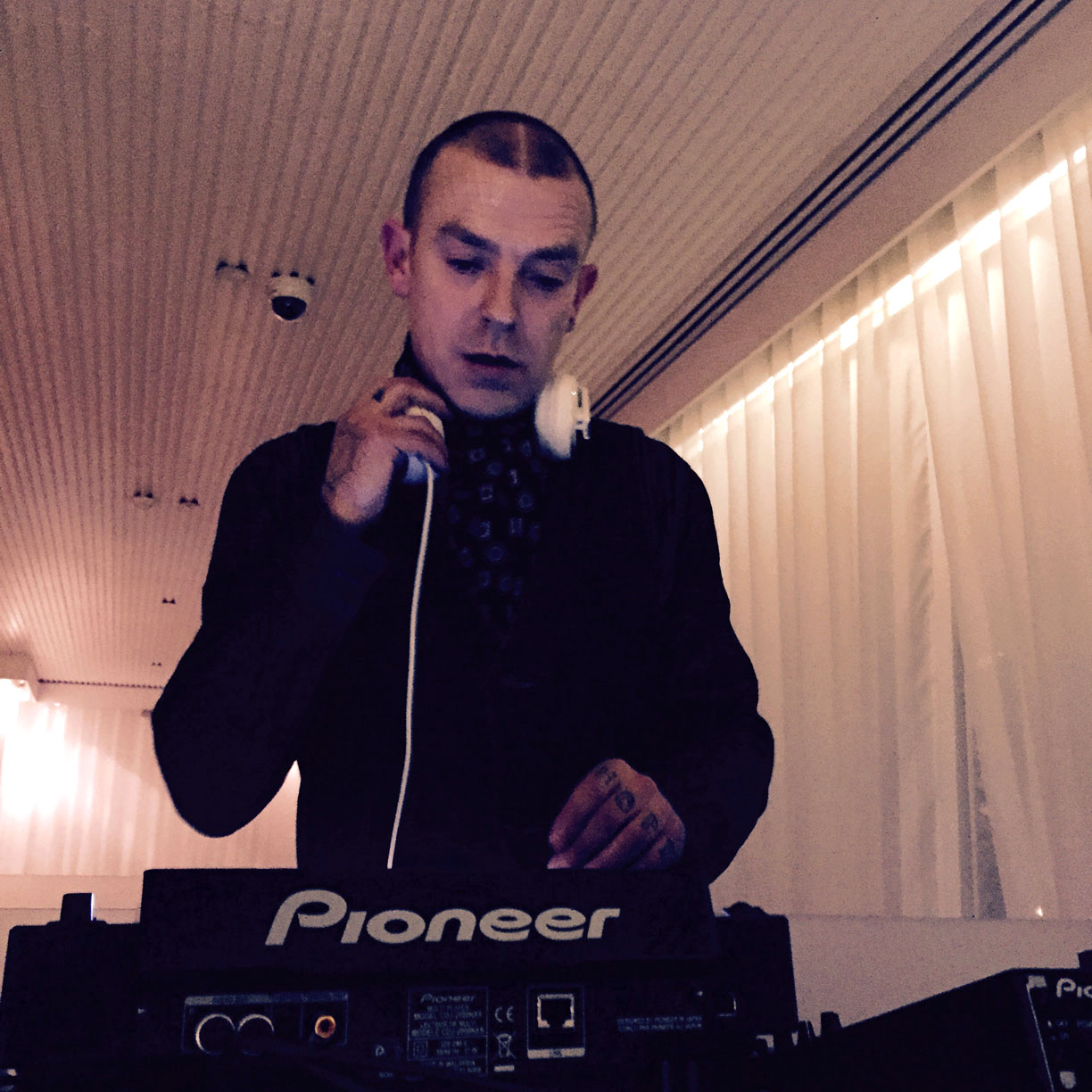
English DJ Adamski won Best Contemporary Song alongside Seal.

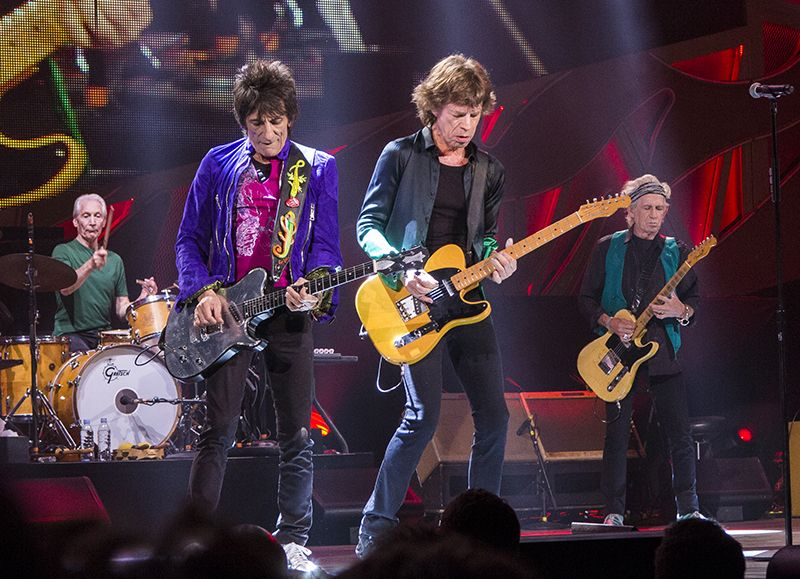
The Rolling Stones members Mick Jagger, Keith Richards, Charlie Watts, Ronnie Wood and Bill Wyman received the award for Outstanding Contribution to British Music.

The 36th Ivor Novello Awards were presented on May 2, 1991, at the Grosvenor House, London.

Category	Recipient and nominees
Best Contemporary Song	**"Killer" – Written by Adam "Adamski" Tinley and Seal; Performed by Adamski**; "Don't Worry" – Written by Kim Appleby, Craig Logan and George Deangelis; Performed by Kim Appleby; "Unbelievable" – Written by James Atken, Ian Dench, Zachary Foley, Mark Decloedt and Deran Brownson; Performed by EMF
Best Film Theme or Song	**The Witches – Written by Stanley Myers**; Arachnophobia – Written by Trevor Jones; Lily Was Here – Written by Dave Stewart
Best Song Musically and Lyrically	**"Sacrifice" – Written by Elton John and Bernie Taupin; Performed by Elton John**; "Nothing Ever Happens" – Written by Justin Currie; Performed by Del Amitri; "We Let the Stars Go" – Written by Paddy McAloon; Performed by Prefab Sprout
Best Theme from a TV/Radio Commercial	**"Only You" from Fiat Tempra – Written by Geoff MacCormack and Simon Goldenberg**; "Citric Bite" from Schweppes Tonic – Written by Don Gould and James Lowther; "Nick of Time" from Audi – Written by Tony Sadler and Gaynor Sadler
Best Theme from a TV/Radio Production	**The Victorian Kitchen Garden – Written by Paul Reade**; The Green Man – Written by Tim Souster; Tidy Endings – Written by Stanley Myers
Outstanding Contribution to British Music	**The Rolling Stones (Mick Jagger, Keith Richards, Charlie Watts, Ronnie Wood and Bill Wyman)**
Outstanding Services to British Music	**Robert Farnon**
PRS Most Performed Work	**"Blue Savannah" – Written by Andy Bell and Vince Clarke; Performed by Erasure**; "All I Wanna Do Is Make Love to You" – Written by Robert John "Mutt" Lange; Performed by Heart; "Killer" – Written by Adam "Adamski" Tinley and Seal; Performed by Adamski
Songwriter of the Year	**Phil Collins**
Special Award for International Achievement	**Albert Hammond**
The Best Selling "A" Side	**"Sacrifice/Healing Hands" – Written by Elton John and Bernie Taupin; Performed by Elton John**; "Killer" – Written by Adam "Adamski" Tinley and Seal; Performed by Adamski; "World in Motion" – Written by Bernard Sumner, Stephen Morris, Gillian Gilbert, Keith Allen and Peter Hook; Performed by New Order
The International Hit of the Year	**"All Around the World" – Written by Lisa Stansfield, Ian Devaney and Andrew Morris; Performed by Lisa Stansfield**; "Close to You" – Written by Gary Benson, Winston Sela and Maxi Elliott; Performed by Maxi Priest; "I've Been Thinking About You" – Written by George Chandler, Jimmy Chambers, Jimmy Helms and Liam Henshall; Performed by Londonbeat
The Jimmy Kennedy Award	**John Barry**

=== 1992 ===
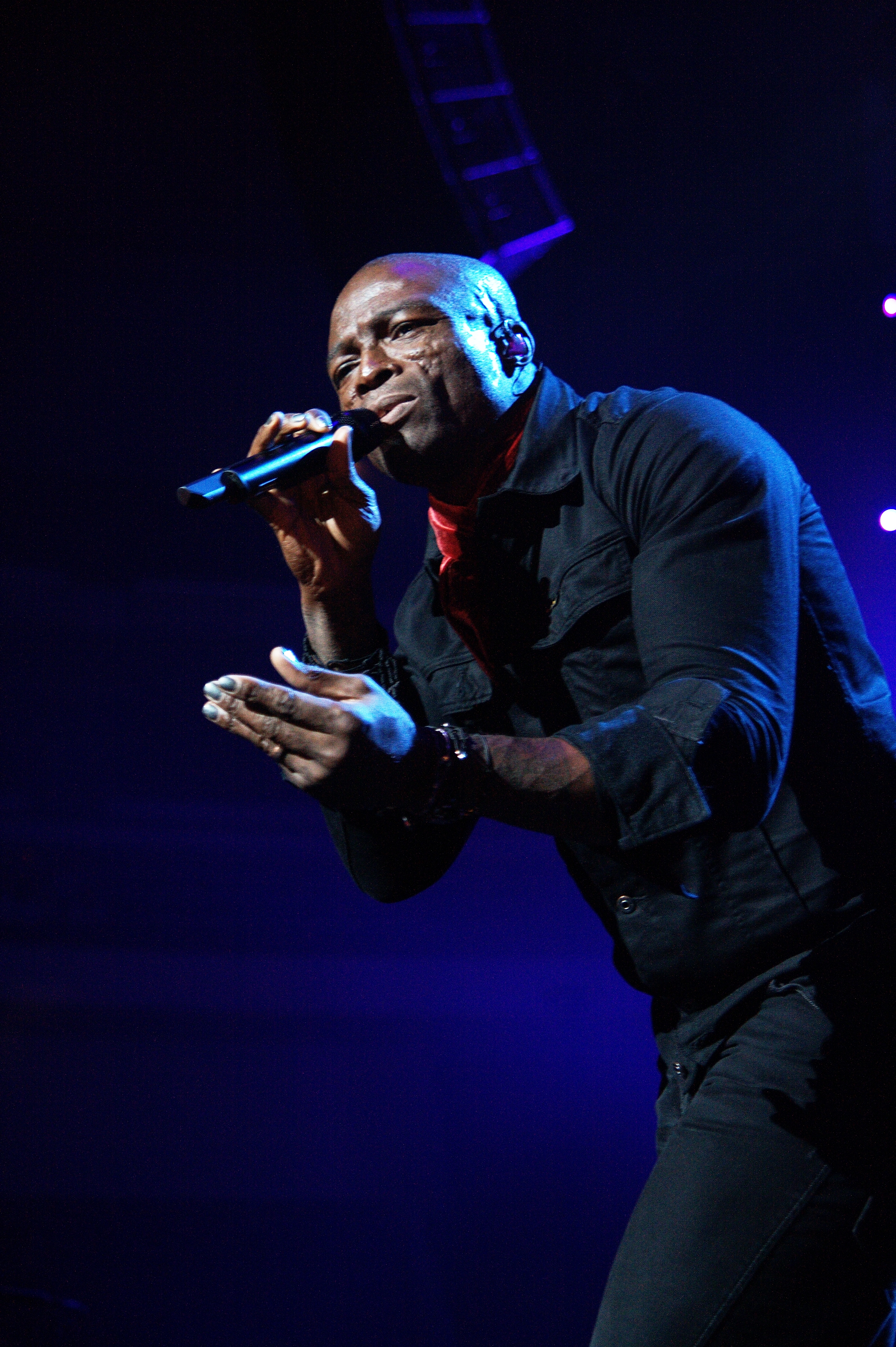
Musician Seal received two awards for the song "Crazy".

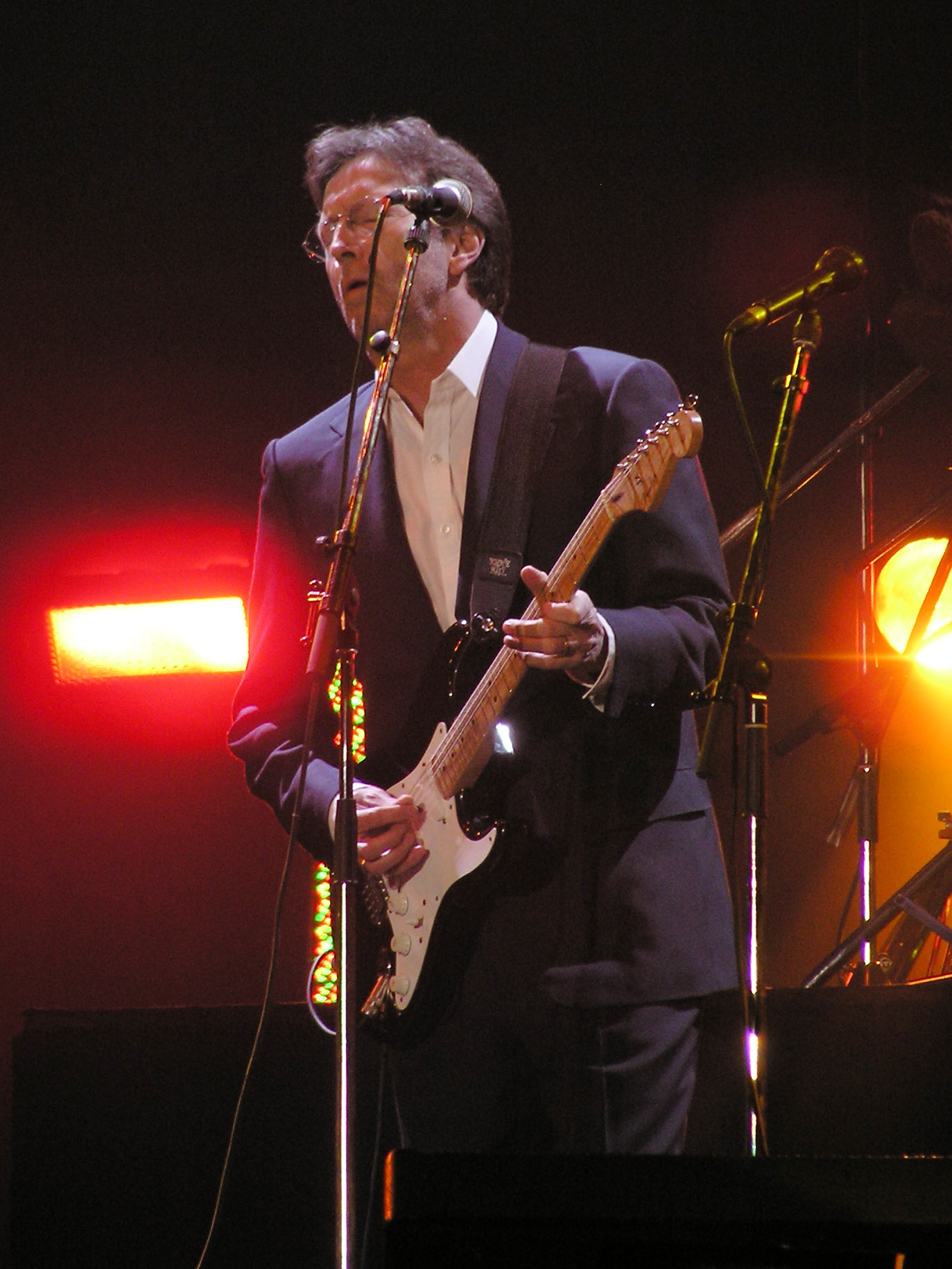
Lifetime Achievement Award recipient Eric Clapton

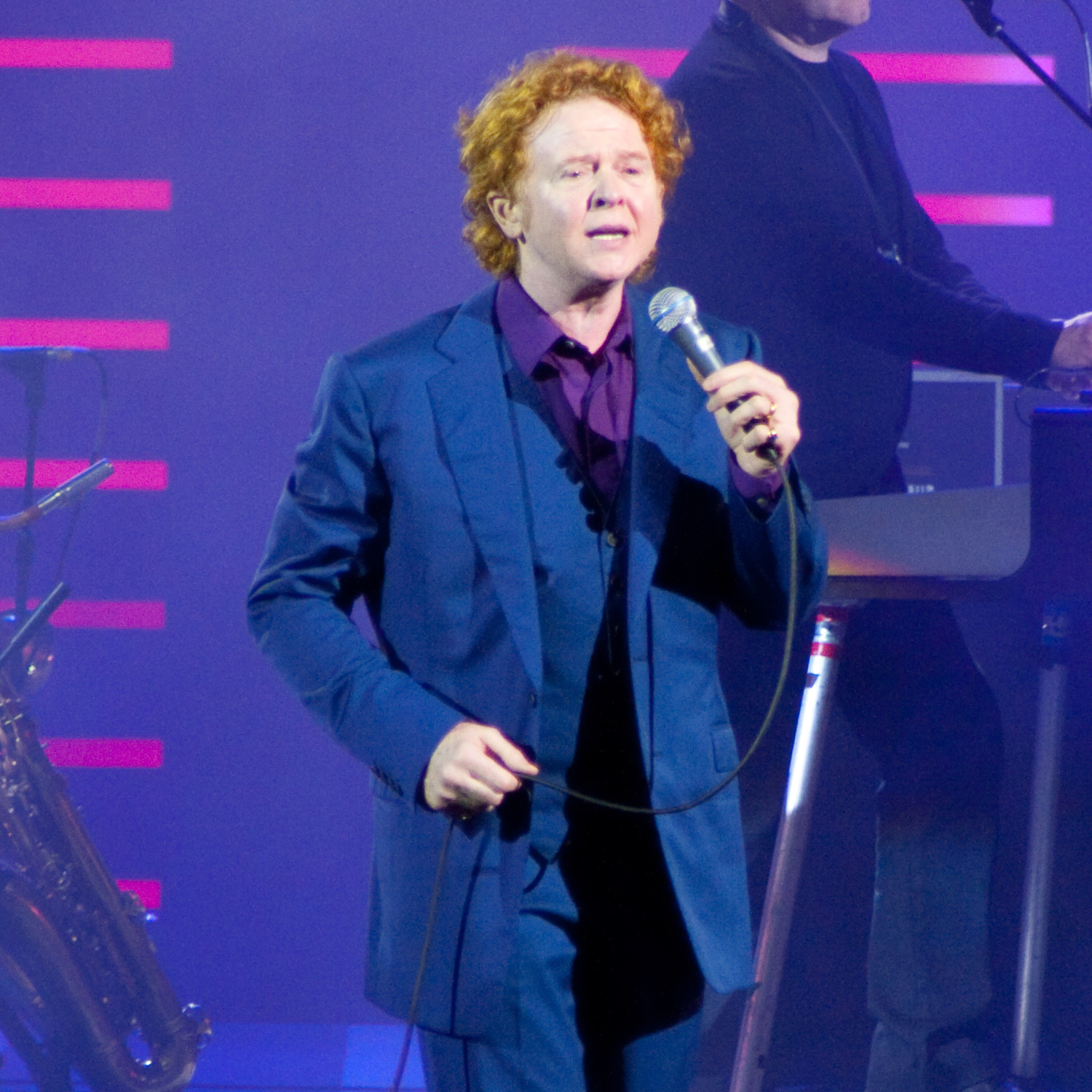
Simply Red lead singer Mick Hucknall won Songwriter of the Year.

The 37th Ivor Novello Awards were presented in May 1992 at the Grosvenor House, London.

Category	Recipient and nominees
Award in Recognition of the Exceptional Success of a Single Song	**"(Everything I Do) I Do It for You" – Written by Bryan Adams, Michael Kamen and Robert John "Mutt" Lange; Performed by Bryan Adams**
Best British Musical	**Joseph and the Amazing Technicolor Dreamcoat – Written by Andrew Lloyd Webber and Tim Rice**
Best Contemporary Song	**"Crazy" – Written and performed by Seal**; "Sit Down" – Written by Timothy Booth, Lawrence Gott, James Glennie and Gavan Whelan; Performed by James; "Walking Down Madison" – Written by Kirsty MacColl and Johnny Marr; Performed by Kirsty MacColl
Best Film Theme or Song	**Under Suspicion – Written by Christopher Gunning**; Dances with Wolves – Written by John Barry; "The One and Only" from Buddy's Song – Written by Nik Kershaw; Performed by Chesney Hawkes
Best Song Musically and Lyrically	**"The Whole of the Moon" – Written by Mike Scott; Performed by The Waterboys**; "Stars" – Written by Mick Hucknall; Performed by Simply Red; "The Show Must Go On" – Written by Freddie Mercury, Brian May, Roger Taylor and John Deacon; Performed by Queen
Best Theme from a TV/Radio Commercial	**"Driven by You" from Ford Motor Company – Written by Brian May**; "Eagle Star – Reflections" from Eagle Star Insurance – Written by Raf Ravenscroft and Kevin Dillon-Lamb; "Excaliber" – Written by Rachel Portman
Best Theme from a TV/Radio Production	**The Darling Buds of May – Written by Philip Burley and Barrie Guard**; A Question of Attribution – Written by Gerald Gouriet; Clarissa – Written by Colin Towns
Lifetime Achievement Award	**Eric Clapton**
Outstanding Contribution to British Music	**Pink Floyd (David Gilmour, Nick Mason, Roger Waters and Richard Wright)**
PRS Most Performed Work	**"I'm Too Sexy" – Written by Fred Fairbrass, Rob Manzoli and Richard Fairbrass; Performed by Right Said Fred**; "Any Dream Will Do" – Written by Andrew Lloyd Webber and Tim Rice; "The One and Only" – Written by Nik Kershaw; Performed by Chesney Hawkes
Songwriter of the Year	**Mick Hucknall**
Special Award for International Achievement	**Bernie Taupin**; Performed by Queen
The Best Selling "A" Side	**"Bohemian Rhapsody/These Are the Days of Our Lives" – Written by Freddie Mercury, Brian May, Roger Taylor and John Deacon**; "Any Dream Will Do" – Written by Andrew Lloyd Webber and Tim Rice; "I'm Too Sexy" – Written by Fred Fairbrass, Rob Manzoli and Richard Fairbrass; Performed by Right Said Fred
The International Hit of the Year	**"Crazy" – Written and performed by Seal**; "3 a.m. Eternal" – Written by Bill Drummond, Jimmy Cauty and Ricky Lyte; Performed by The KLF; "Unbelievable" – Written by James Atkin, Ian Dench, Mark Decloedt, Zachary Foley and Derran Brownson; Performed by EMF
The Jimmy Kennedy Award	**Tony Hatch and Jackie Trent**

=== 1993 ===
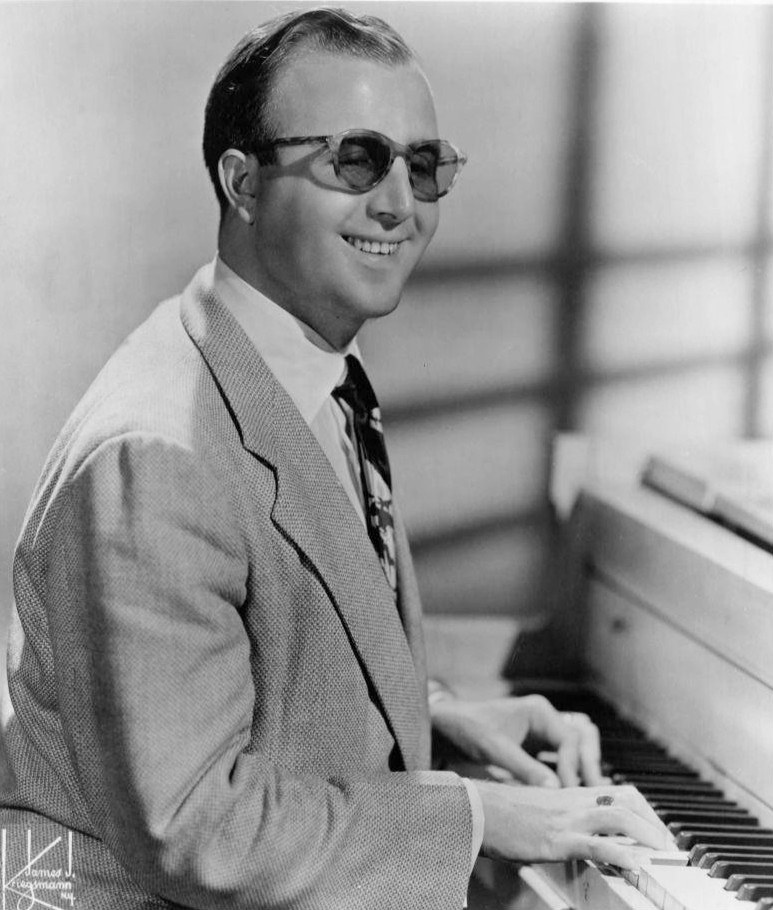
British jazz pianist George Shearing received the award for Lifetime Achievement.

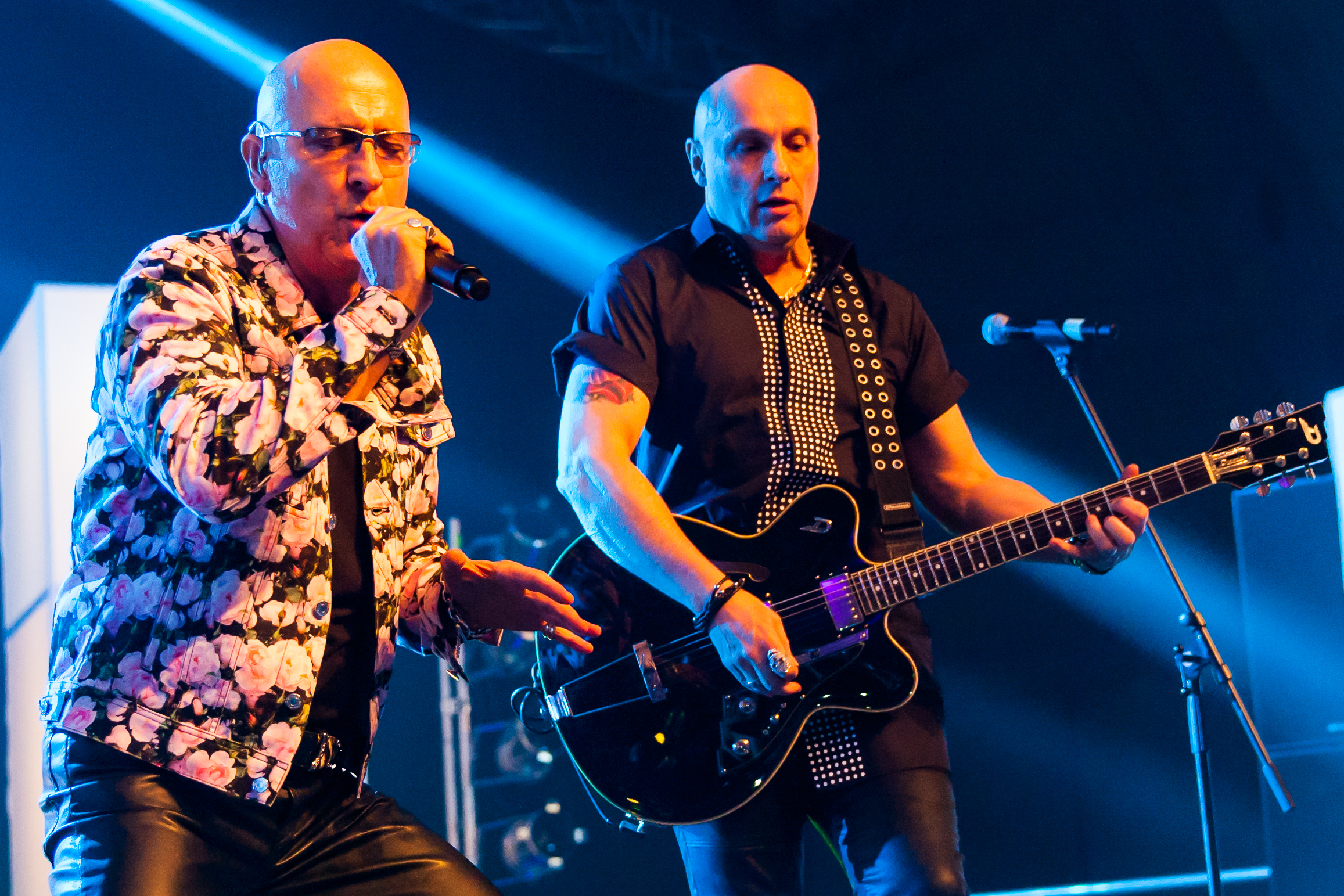
Right Said Fred members Richard Fairbrass (left), Fred Fairbrass (right) and Rob Manzoli won the PRS Most Performed Work award for the song "Deeply Dippy".

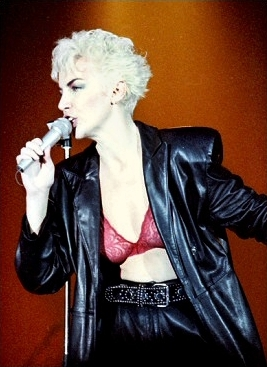
Annie Lennox won Best Song Musically and Lyrically for "Why".

The 38th Ivors were presented on May 26, 1993 at the Grosvenor House, London.

Category	Recipient and nominees
Best Contemporary Song	**"Would I Lie to You?" – Written by Peter Vale and Mick Leeson; Performed by Charles & Eddie**; "Friday I'm in Love" – Written by Robert Smith, Simon Gallup, Porl Thompson, Boris Williams and Perry Bamonte; Performed by The Cure; "Stay" – Written by Marcella Detroit, Siobhan Fahey and Dave Stewart; Performed by Shakespears Sister
Best Film Theme or Song	**"Tears in Heaven" from Rush – Written by Eric Clapton and Will Jennings**; Chaplin – Written by John Barry; Final Analysis – Written by George Fenton
Best Song Musically and Lyrically	**"Why" – Written and performed by Annie Lennox**; "Tears in Heaven" – Written by Eric Clapton and Will Jennings; Performed by Eric Clapton; "The Disappointed" – Written by Andy Partridge; Performed by XTC
Best Theme from a TV/Radio Production	**Civvies – Composed by Michael Storey**; The Blackheath Poisonings – Written by Colin Towns; "Kyrie Eleison" from The Big Battalions – Written by Christopher Gunning
Lifetime Achievement	**George Shearing**
Outstanding Contemporary Song Collection	**Shakespears Sister (Marcella Detroit, Siobhan Fahey and Dave Stewart)**
Outstanding Contribution to British Music	**The Hollies (Bernie Calvert, Allan Clarke, Bobby Elliott, Tony Hicks, Graham Nash and Terry Sylvester)**
PRS Most Performed Work	**"Deeply Dippy" – Written by Fred Fairbrass, Rob Manzoli and Richard Fairbrass; Performed by Right Said Fred**; "Stay" – Written by Marcella Detroit, Siobhan Fahey and Dave Stewart; Performed by Shakespears Sister; "Would I Lie to You?" – Written by Peter Vale and Mick Leeson; Performed by Charles & Eddie
Songwriters of the Year	**Colin Angus and Richard West**
Special Award for International Achievement	**Rod Temperton**
The Best Selling Song	**Would I Lie to You?" – Written by Peter Vale and Mick Leeson; Performed by Charles & Eddie**; "Goodnight Girl" – Written by Marti Pellow, Neil Mitchell, Tom Cunningham and Graeme Clark; Performed by Wet Wet Wet; "Ain't No Doubt" – Written by Jimmy Nail, Danny Schogger, Charlie Dore and Guy Pratt; Performed by Jimmy Nail; "Stay" – Written by Marcella Detroit, Siobhan Fahey and Dave Stewart; Performed by Shakespears Sister
The International Hit of the Year	**Would I Lie to You?" – Written by Peter Vale and Mick Leeson; Performed by Charles & Eddie**; "Why" – Written by Annie Lennox; "Stay" – Written by Marcella Detroit, Siobhan Fahey and Dave Stewart; Performed by Shakespears Sister; "Tears in Heaven" – Written by Eric Clapton and Will Jennings; Performed by Eric Clapton
The Jimmy Kennedy Award	**Les Reed**

=== 1994 ===
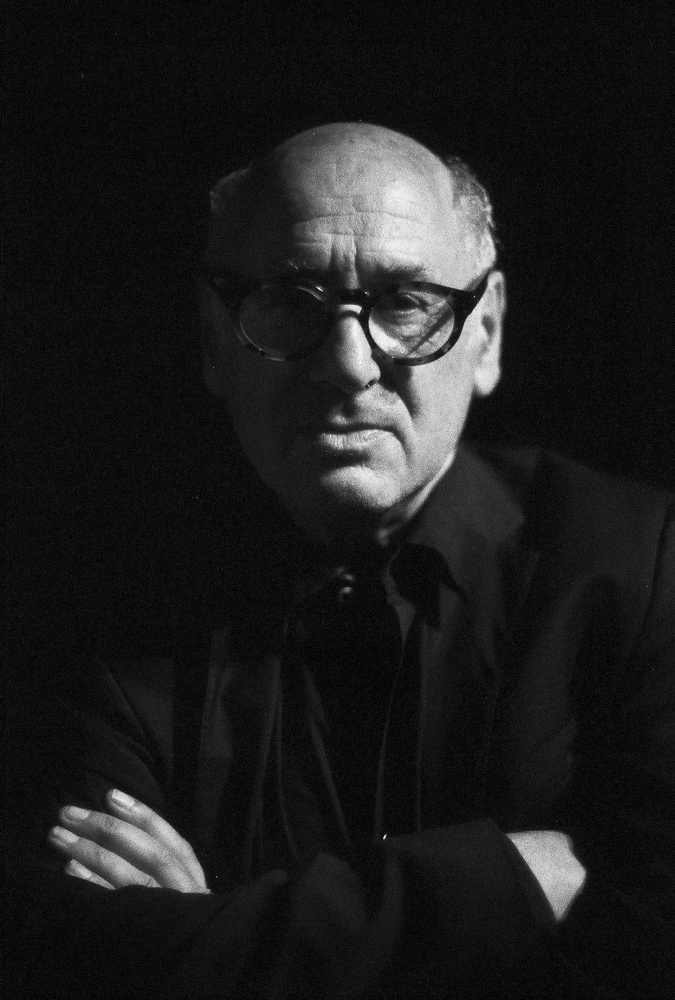
English composer Michael Nyman won Best Film Theme or Song for the film The Piano.

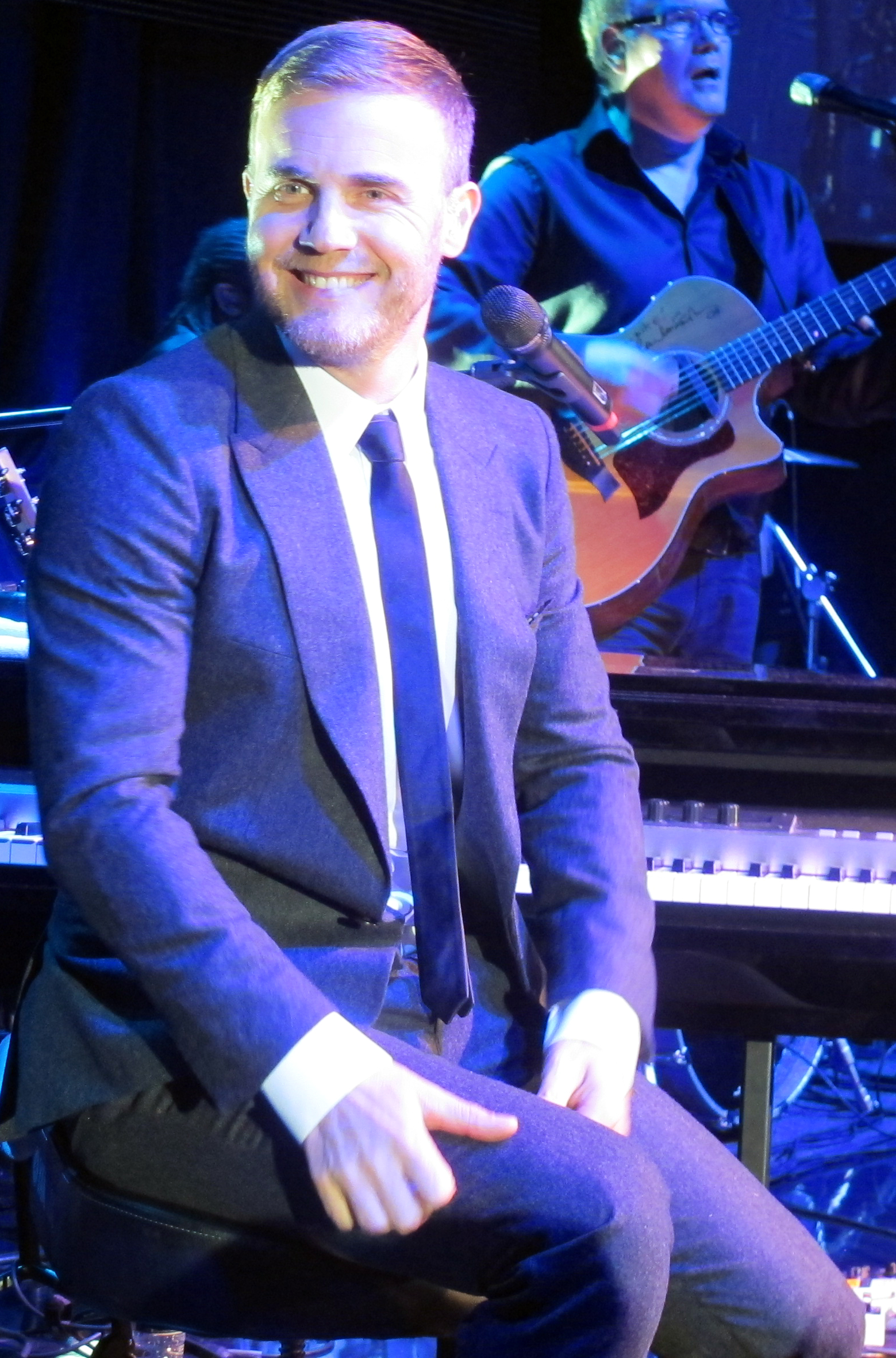
Take That member Gary Barlow won two awards including Songwriter of the Year.

The 39th Ivors were presented on May 25, 1994 at the Grosvenor House, London.

Category	Recipient and nominees
Best Contemporary Song	**"Pray" – Written by Gary Barlow; Performed by Take That**; "Arranged Marriage" – Written by Stephen Kapur, Simon Duggal and Diamond Duggal; Performed by Apache Indian; "Moving On Up" – Written by Paul Heard and Mike Pickering, Performed by M People
Best Film Theme or Song	**The Piano – Written by Michael Nyman**; Indochine – Written by Patrick Doyle; Into the West – Written by Patrick Doyle
Best Song Musically and Lyrically	**"If I Ever Lose My Faith in You" – Written and performed by Sting**; "I Don't Wanna Fight" – Written by Steve Duberry, Billy Lawrie and Lulu; Performed by Tina Turner; "Ordinary World" – Written by Simon Le Bon, Nick Rhodes, John Taylor and Warren Cuccurullo; Performed by Duran Duran
Best Theme from a TV/Radio Production	**Stalag Luft – Written by Stanley Myers**; Harnessing Peacocks – Written by Richard Holmes; Unnatural Causes – Written by Richard Harvey
Lifetime Achievement Award	**Ron Goodwin**
Outstanding Contribution to British Music	**Tim Rice**
Outstanding Contribution to British Musical Theatre	**Andrew Lloyd Webber**
PRS Most Performed Work	**"Ordinary World" – Written by Simon Le Bon, Nick Rhodes, John Taylor and Warren Cuccurullo; Performed by Duran Duran**; "Little Bird" – Written and performed by Annie Lennox; "Tears in Heaven" – Written by Eric Clapton and Will Jennings; Performed by Eric Clapton
Songwriter of the Year	**Gary Barlow**
Special Award for International Achievement	**U2 (Bono, Adam Clayton, Larry Mullen Jr. and The Edge)**
The Best Selling Song	**"Mr Blobby" – Written by David Rogers and Paul Shaw; Performed by Mr Blobby**; "Babe" – Written by Gary Barlow; Performed by Take That; "Dreams" – Written by Timothy Laws and Gabrielle; Performed by Gabrielle
The International Hit of the Year	**"Living on My Own" – Written and performed by Freddie Mercury**; "I Feel You" – Written by Martin Gore; Performed by Depeche Mode; "Ordinary World" – Written by Simon Le Bon, Nick Rhodes, John Taylor and Warren Cuccurullo; Performed by Duran Duran
The Jimmy Kennedy Award	**Roger Cook and Roger Greenaway**
The Outstanding Contemporary Song Collection	**Paul Weller**

=== 1995 ===
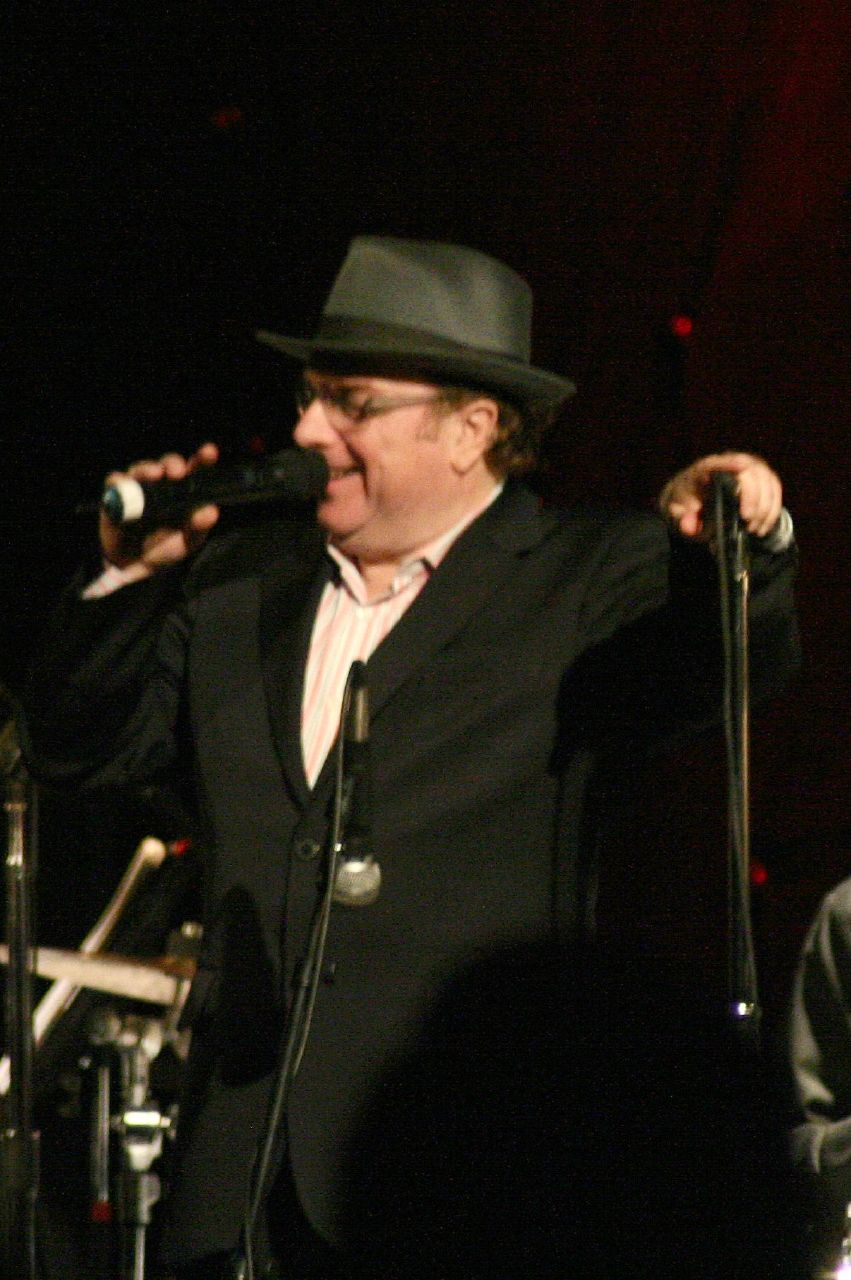
Northern Irish singer-songwriter Van Morrison received the Lifetime Achievement award.

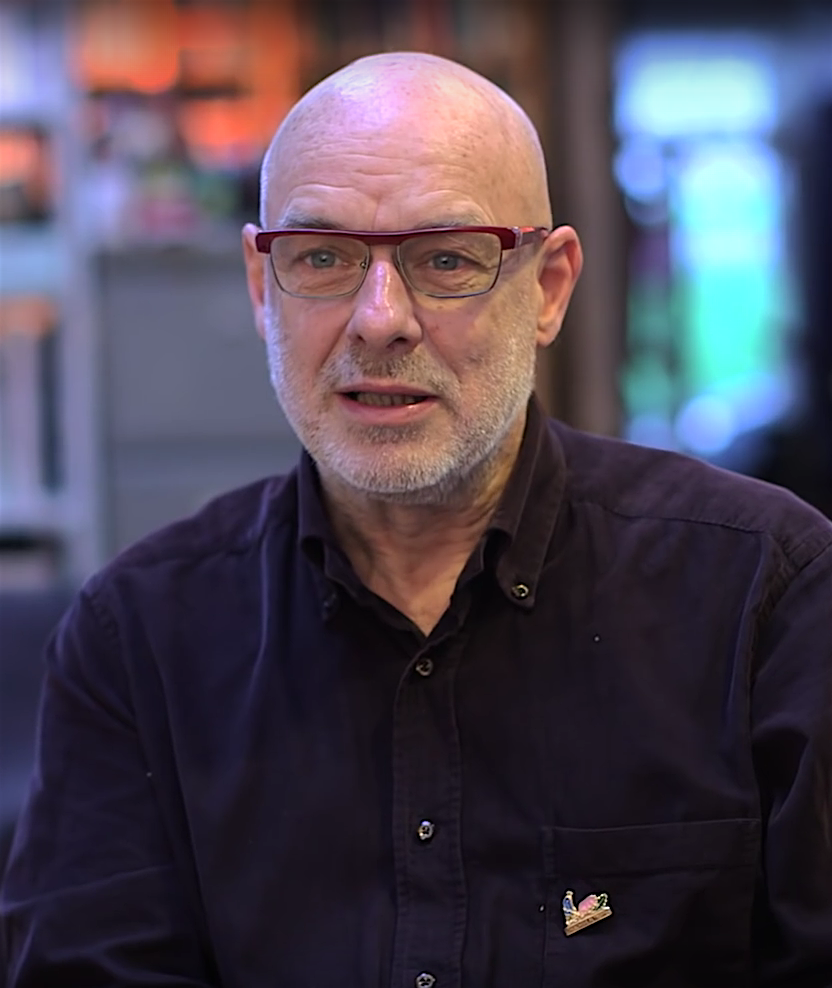
British musician Brian Eno won the Radio 1 Award for Continuing Innovation in Music.

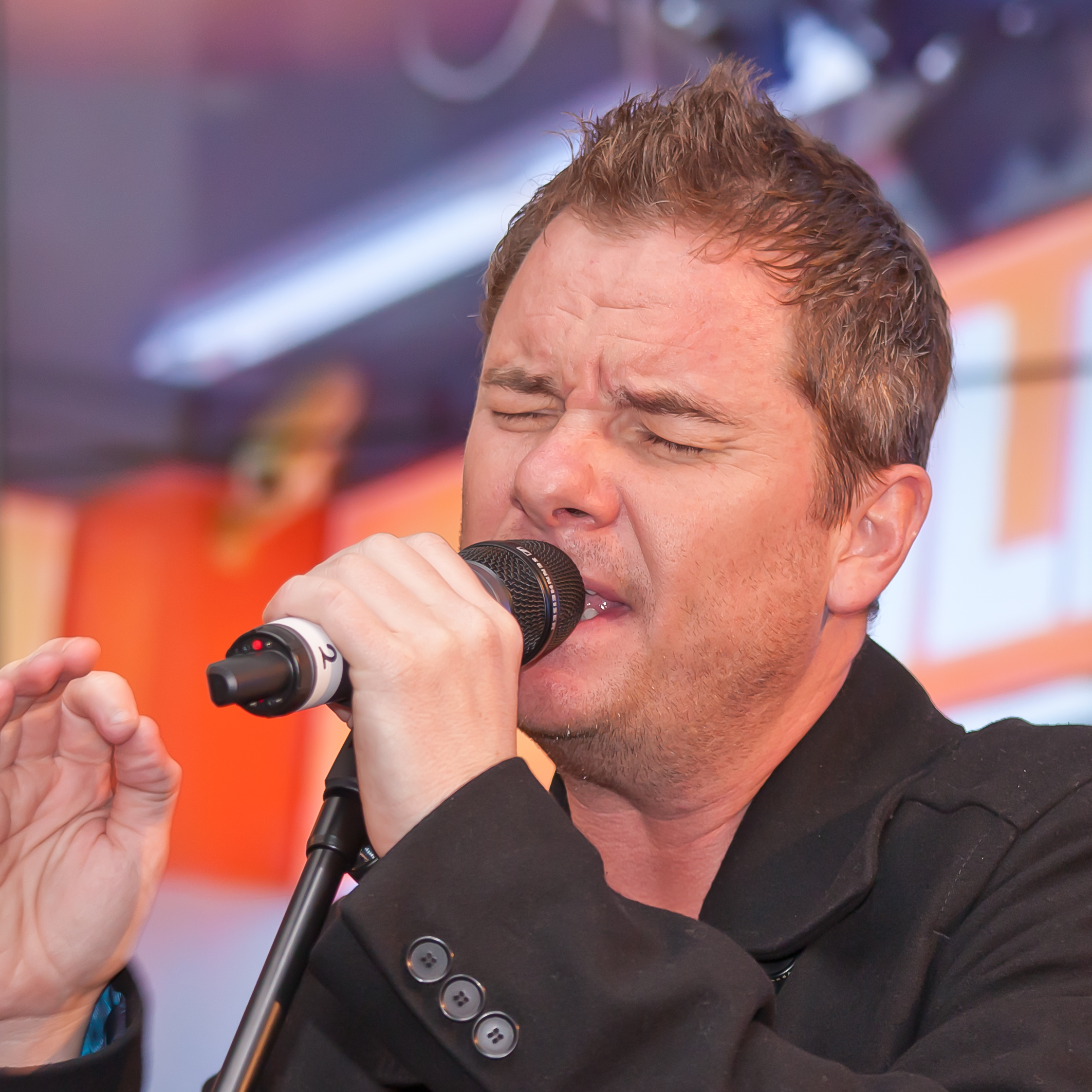
East 17 member Tony Mortimer won Songwriter of the Year.

The 40th Ivors were presented on May 23, 1995, at the Grosvenor House, London.

Category	Recipient and nominees
Best Commissioned Film Score	**Shadowlands – Written by George Fenton**; Deadly Advice – Written by Richard Harvey; The Joy Luck Club – Written by Rachel Portman
Best Contemporary Song	**"You Gotta Be" – Written by Des'ree Weekes and Ashley Ingra; Performed by Des'ree**; "Parklife" – Written by Damon Albarn, Graham Coxon, Alex James and Dave Rowntree; Performed by Blur; "Zombie" – Written by Dolores Mary O'Riordan; Performed by The Cranberries
Best Song Included in a Film	**"The Circle of Life" from The Lion King – Written by Elton John and Tim Rice; Performed by Elton John**; "In the Name of the Father" from the film of the same name – Written by Bono, Gavin Friday and Maurice Roycroft; Performed by U2; "Love is All Around" from Four Weddings and a Funeral – Written by Reg Presley; Performed by The Troggs
Best Song Musically and Lyrically	**"Think Twice" – Written by Andy Hill and Peter Sinfield; Performed by Celine Dion**; "Dear John" – Written by Mark Nevin and Kirsty McColl; Performed by Eddi Reader; "Patience of Angels" – Written by Boo Hewerdine; Performed by Eddi Reader
Best Theme from a TV/Radio Production	**Middlemarch – Written by Stanley Myers**; Beyond the Clouds – Written by George Fenton; Crocodile Shoes – Written by Tony McAnaney
Lifetime Achievement	**Van Morrison**
Outstanding Contribution to British Music	**Lonnie Donegan**
PRS Most Performed Work	**"Love is All Around" – Written by Reg Presley; Performed by The Troggs**; "Baby, Come Back" – Written by Eddy Grant; Performed by The Equals; "Stay Another Day" – Written by Tony Mortimer, Dominic Hawken and Robert Kean; Performed by East 17
Songwriter of the Year	**Tony Mortimer**
The International Hit of the Year	**"Love is All Around" – Written by Reg Presley; Performed by The Troggs**; "Without You" – Written by Pete Ham and Tom Evans; Performed by Mariah Carey; "7 Seconds" – Written by Cameron McVey, Jonathan Peter Sharp, Youssou N'Dour and Neneh Cherry; Performed by Youssou N'Dour and Neneh Cherry; "Baby, I Love Your Way" – Written by Peter Frampton; Performed by Big Mountain
The Jimmy Kennedy Award	**Don Black**
The Outstanding Contemporary Song Collection	**Elvis Costello**
The Radio 1 Award for Continuing Innovation in Music	**Brian Eno**

=== 1996 ===
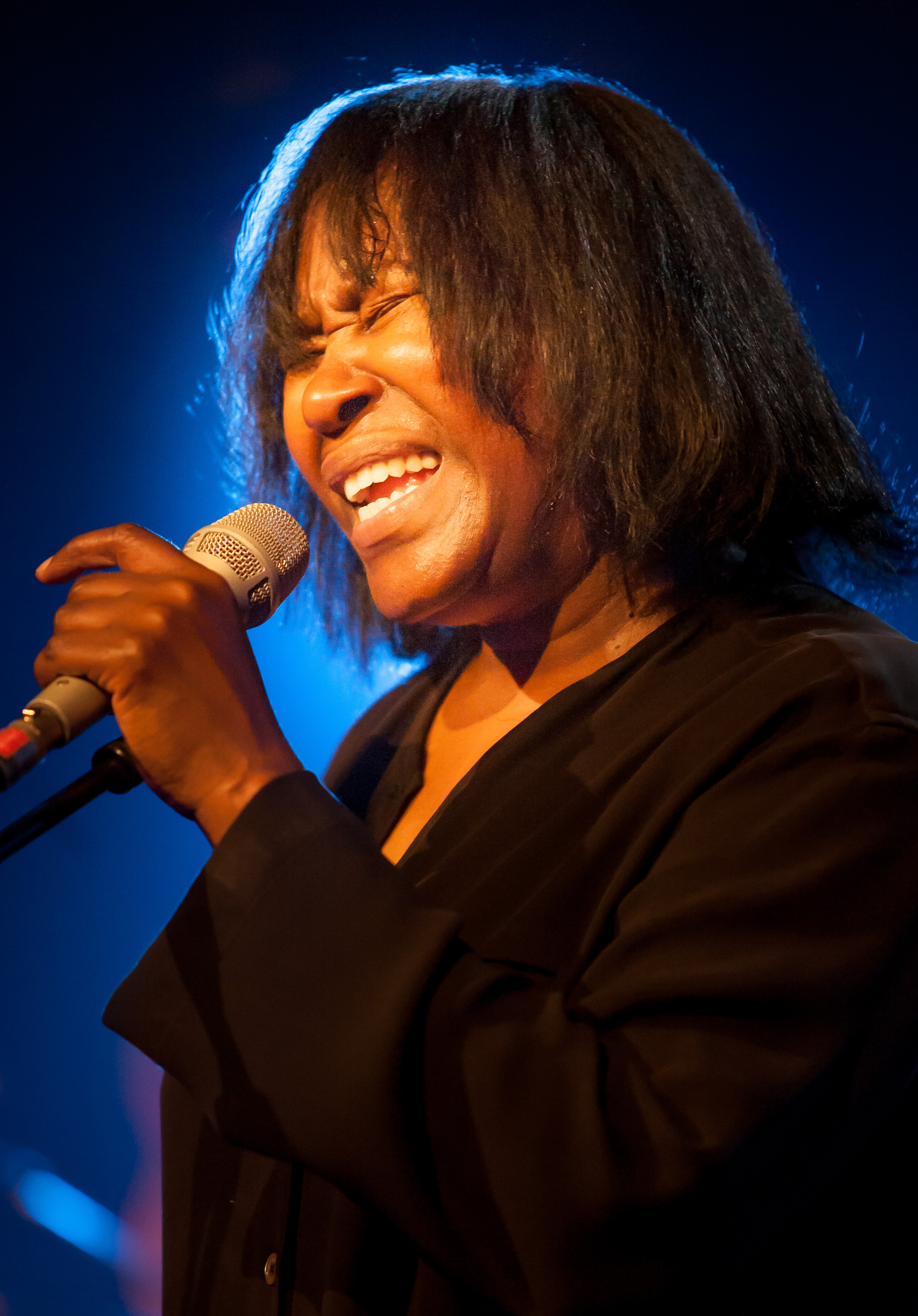
Outstanding Contemporary Song Collection recipient Joan Armatrading

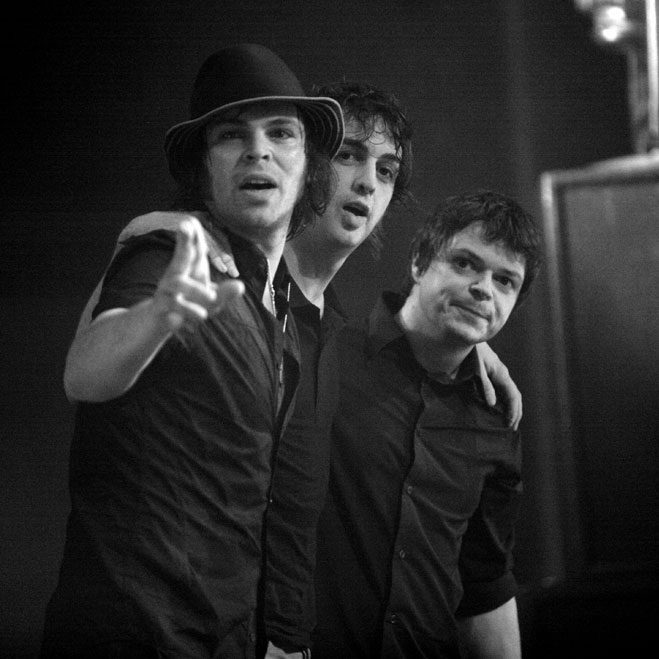
English band Supergrass won Best Contemporary Song for "Alright".

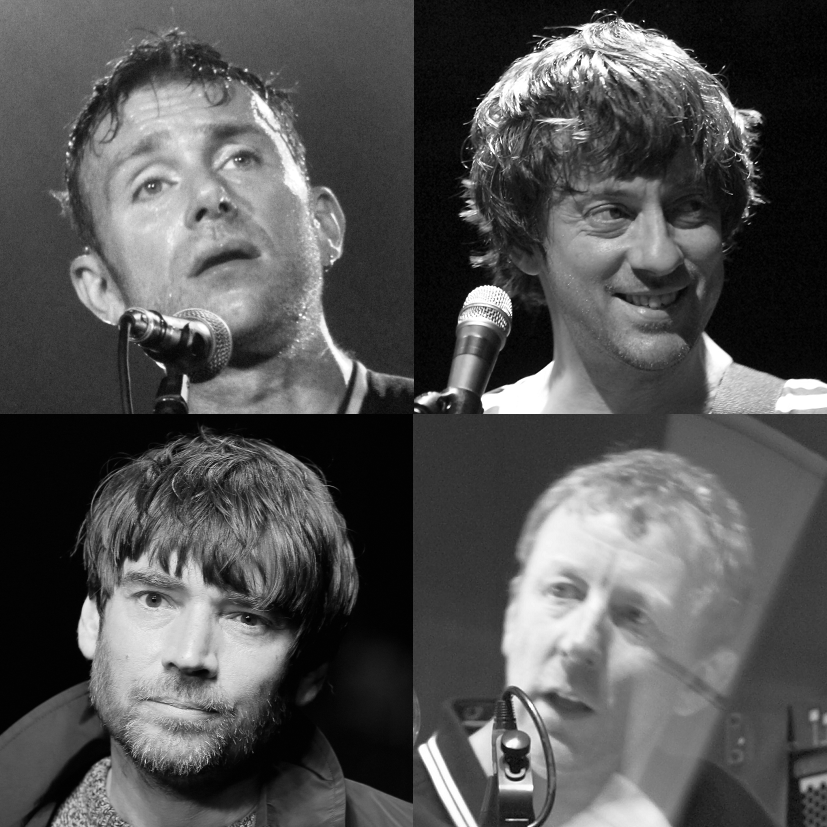
Blur members Damon Albarn, Graham Coxon, Alex James and Dave Rowntree shared the award for Songwriters of the Year with Oasis's Noel Gallagher.

The 41st Ivors were presented on May 30, 1996, at the Grosvenor House, London.

Category	Recipient and nominees
Outstanding Contemporary Song Collection	**Joan Armatrading**
Best Commissioned Film Score	**Don Juan DeMarco – Composed by Michael Kamen**; Nostradamus – Composed by Barrington Pheloung; A Pin for the Butterfly – Composed by Ilona Sekacz
Best Commissioned Score from a TV/Radio Production	**The Hanging Gale – Written by Shaun Davey**; Pride and Prejudice – Written by Carl Davis; The Death of Yugoslavia – Written by Debbie Wiseman
Best Contemporary Song	**"Alright" – Written by Danny Goffey, Gaz Coombes and Michael Quinn; Performed by Supergrass**; "A Girl Like You" – Written and performed by Edwyn Collins; "Wonderwall" – Written by Noel Gallagher; Performed by Oasis
Best Song Included in a Film or TV Programme	**"Have You Ever Really Loved a Woman?" from Don Juan DeMarco – Composed by Robert John "Mutt" Lange, Michael Kamen and Bryan Adams; Performed by Bryan Adams**; "GoldenEye" from the film of the same name – Composed by Bono and The Edge; Performed by Tina Turner; "Kiss from a Rose" from Batman Forever – Composed and performed by Seal
Best Song Musically and Lyrically	**"Common People" – Written by Jarvis Cocker, Nick Banks, Candida Doyle, Steve Mackey and Russell Senior; Performed by Pulp**; "Back for Good" – Written by Gary Barlow; Performed by Take That; "No More "I Love You's"" – Written by David Freeman and Joseph Hughes; Performed by Annie Lennox
Outstanding Contribution to British Musical Theatre	**Cameron Mackintosh**
Outstanding Services to British Music	**Jeff Lynne**
PRS Most Performed Work	**"Back for Good" – Written by Gary Barlow; Performed by Take That**; "A Girl Like You" – Written and performed by Edwyn Collins; "No More "I Love You's"" – Written by David Freeman and Joseph Hughes; Performed by Annie Lennox
PRS Outstanding Contribution to British Music	**Small Faces (Kenney Jones, Ronnie Lane, Steve Marriott and Ian McLagan)**
Songwriters of the Year	**Blur (Damon Albarn, Graham Coxon, Alex James and Dave Rowntree)**; **Noel Gallagher**
The Best Selling Song	**"Back for Good" – Written by Gary Barlow; Performed by Take That**; "Fairground" – Written by Mick Hucknall; Performed by Simply Red; "Missing" – Written by Tracey Thorn and Ben Watt; Performed by Everything but the Girl
The International Hit of the Year	**"Kiss from a Rose" – Written and performed by Seal**; "Back for Good" – Written by Gary Barlow; Performed by Take That; "No More "I Love You's"" – Written by David Freeman and Joseph Hughes; Performed by Annie Lennox
The Jimmy Kennedy Award	**Tony Macaulay**

=== 1997 ===
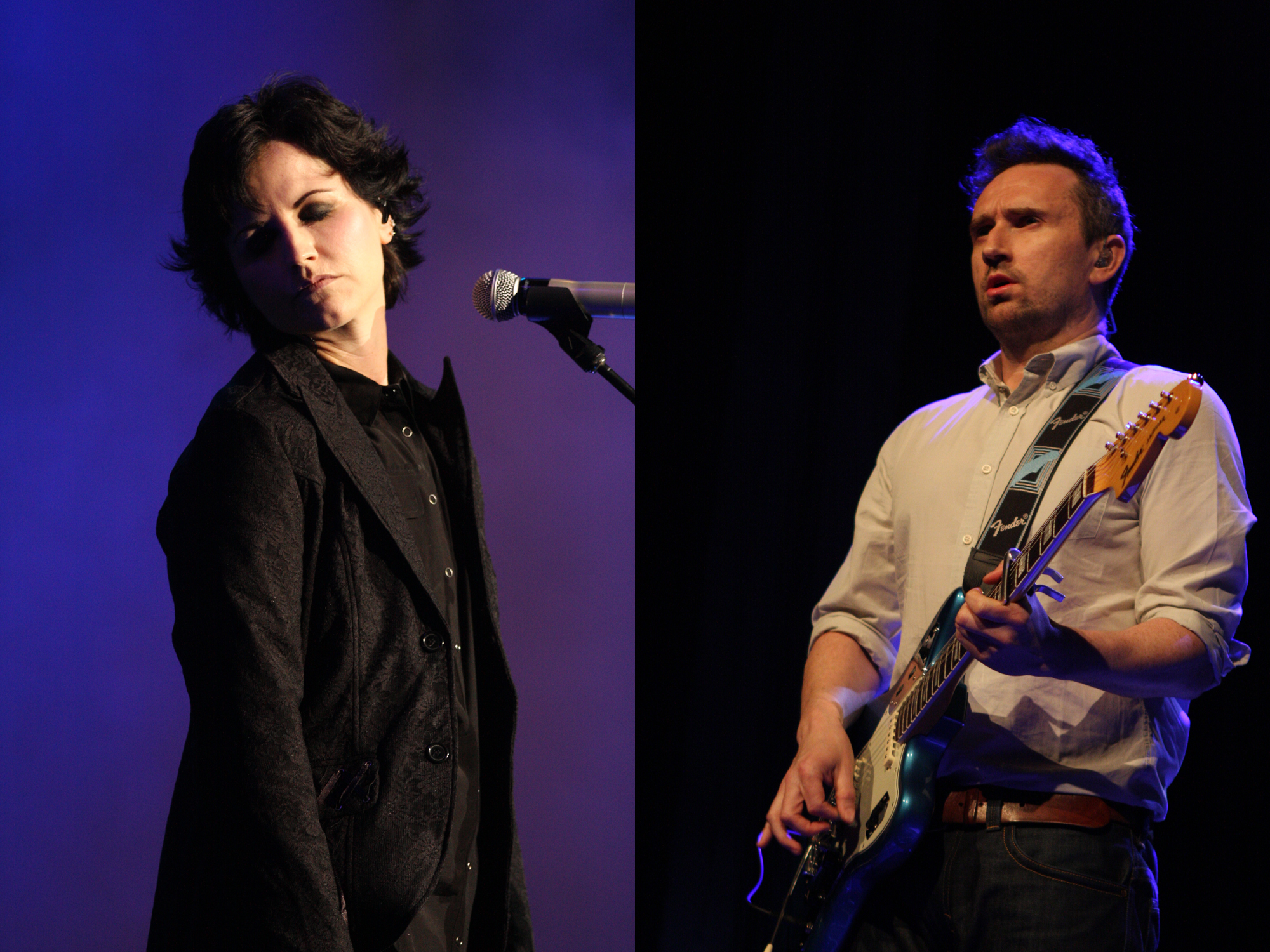
Dolores O'Riordan (left) and Noel Hogan (right) won the International Achievement award for The Cranberries.

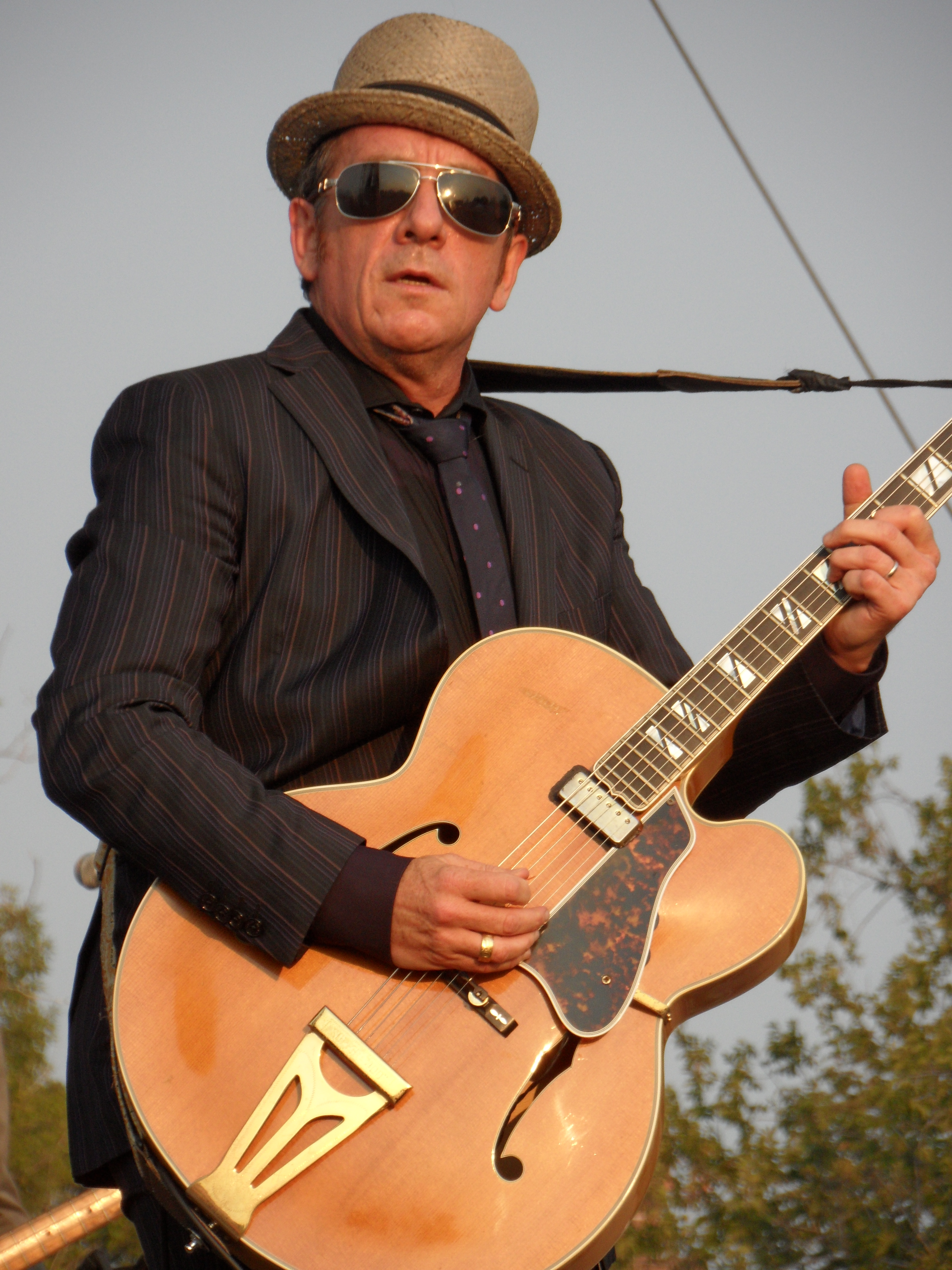
PRS Outstanding Contribution to British Music recipient Elvis Costello

The 42nd Ivors were presented on May 19, 1997 at the Grosvenor House, London.

Category	Recipient and nominees
Best Commissioned Film Score	**101 Dalmatians – Composed by Michael Kamen**; Independence Day – Composed by David Arnold; Twelfth Night – Composed by Shaun Davey
Best Contemporary Song	**"A Design for Life" – Written by James Dean Bradfield, Sean Moore and Nicky Wire; Performed by Manic Street Preachers**; "Firestarter" – Written by Liam Howlett and Keith Flint; Performed by The Prodigy; "Lifted" – Written by Paul Tucker, Martin Brammer and Tunde Baiyewu; Performed by Lighthouse Family
Best Music Commissioned fora Broadcast Production	**Hetty Wainthropp Investigates – Composed by Nigel Hess**; Cold Lazarus – Composed by Christopher Gunning; Rhodes – Composed by Alan Parker
Best Selling British Written Single in the UK	**"Wannabe" – Written by Victoria Beckham, Mel B, Emma Bunton, Melanie C, Geri Halliwell, Matt Rowe and Richard Stannard; Performed by Spice Girls**
Best Song Musically and Lyrically	**"Too Much Love Will Kill You" – Written by Brian May, Frank Musker and Elizabeth Lamers; Performed by Brian May**; "I Am, I Feel" – Written by Terence Martin, Karen Poole and Michelle Poole; Performed by Alisha's Attic; "Neighbourhood" – Written by Thomas Scott, Andrew Parle, James Edwards and Franny Griffiths; Performed by Space
International Achievement	**Noel Hogan and Dolores O'Riordan**
Lifetime Achievement	**Led Zeppelin (Jimmy Page, John Bonham, Robert Plant and John Paul Jones)**
Outstanding Song Collection	**Richard Thompson**
PRS Award for Most Performed Work of 1996	**"Fastlove" – Written and performed by George Michael**; "Don't Look Back in Anger" – Written by Noel Gallagher; Performed by Oasis; "Give Me a Little More Time" – Written by Gabrielle, Benjamin Wolff, Andrew Dean, Ben Barson; Performed by Gabrielle
PRS Outstanding Contribution to British Music	**Elvis Costello**
Songwriter of the Year	**George Michael**
The International Hit of the Year	**"Wannabe" – Written by Victoria Beckham, Mel B, Emma Bunton, Melanie C, Geri Halliwell, Matt Rowe and Richard Stannard; Performed by Spice Girls**
The Jimmy Kennedy Award	**Mike Chapman and Nicky Chinn**

=== 1998 ===
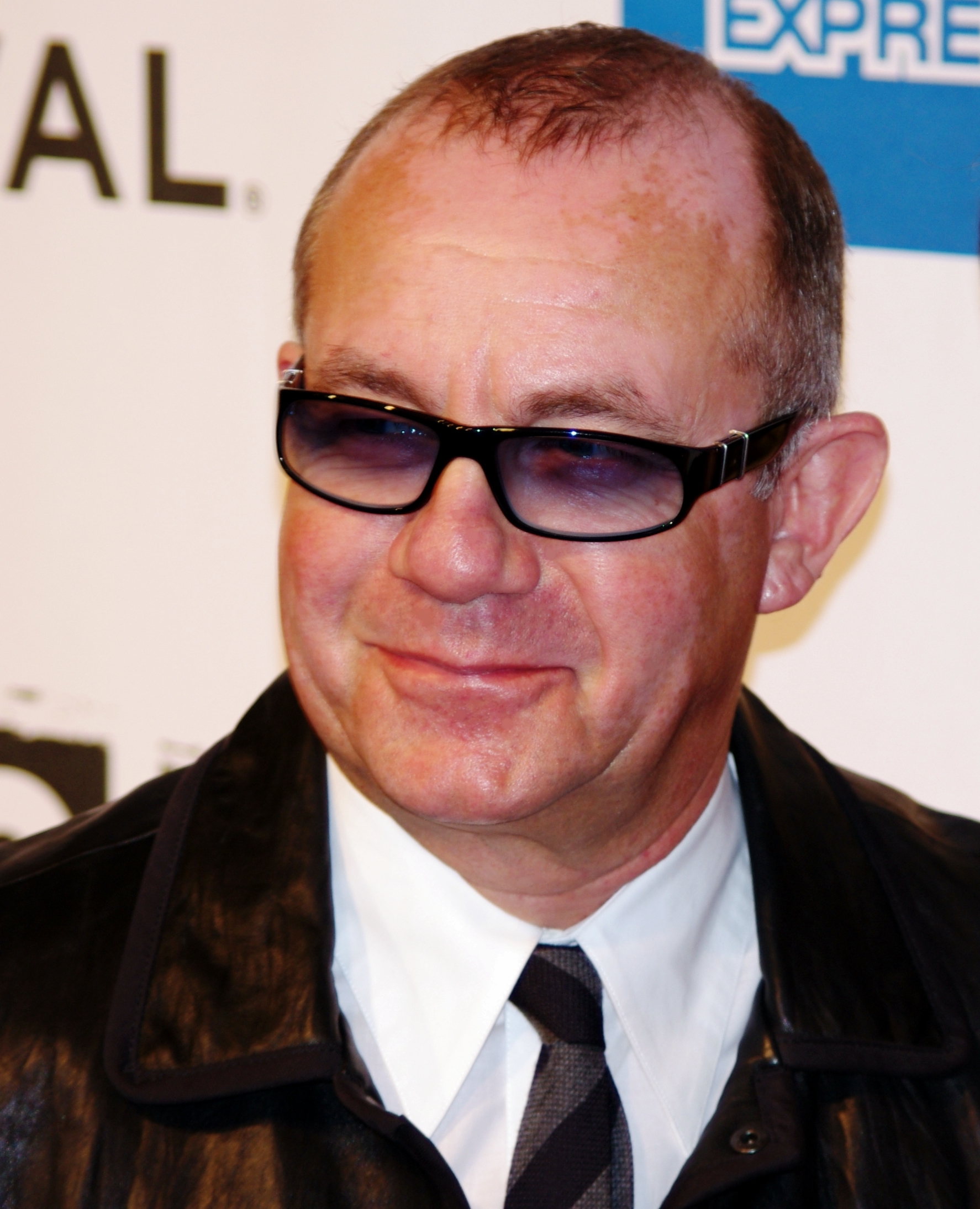
Bernie Taupin won two awards alongside Elton John for the song "Candle in the Wind 1997".

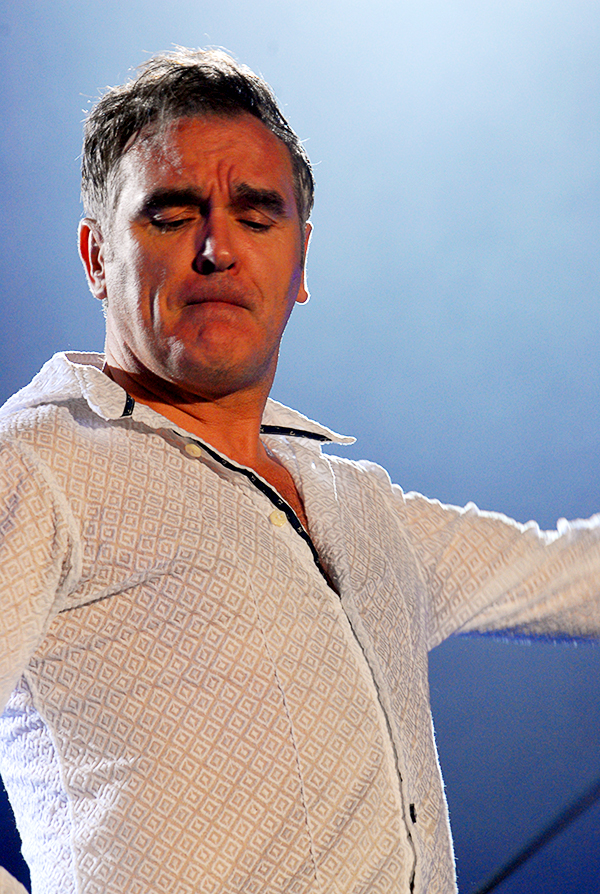
English singer Morrissey received the PRS Outstanding Contribution to British Music award.

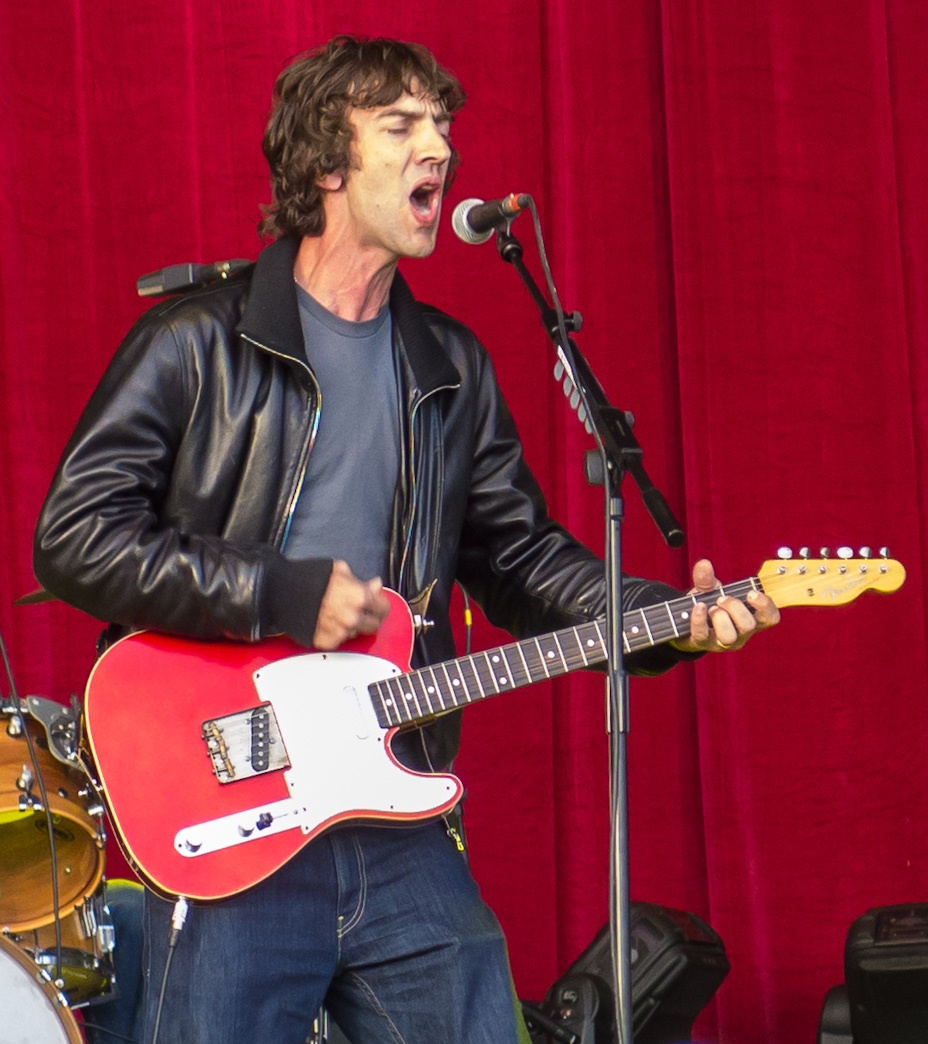
The Verve's lead singer Richard Ashcroft won Songwriter of the Year.

The 43rd Ivors were presented on May 28, 1998 at the Grosvenor House, London.

Category	Recipient and nominees
Best Contemporary Song	**"Karma Police" – Written by Thom Yorke, Jonny Greenwood, Phil Selway, Colin Greenwood and Ed O'Brien; Performed by Radiohead**; "Smile" – Written by James McColl, Ken McAlpine and Alan Tilston; Performed by The Supernaturals; "The Drugs Don't Work" – Written by Richard Ashcroft; Performed by The Verve
Best Dance Music	**"You're Not Alone" – Written by Tim Kellett and Robin Taylor-Firth; Performed by Olive**; "Gunman" – Written by Julian Jonah and Danny Harrison; Performed by 187 Lockdown; "Sunchyme" – Written by Gilbert Gabriel, Nick Laird Clowes, Stephen Spencer, Paul Spencer and Scott Rosser; Performed by Dario G
Best Original Film Score	**Romeo + Juliet – Composed by Craig Armstrong, Marius de Vries and Nellee Hooper**; Tomorrow Never Dies – Composed by David Arnold; Wilde – Composed by Debbie Wiseman
Best Original Music for a Broadcast	**Rebecca – Composed by Christopher Gunning**; Crime Traveller – Composed by Anne Dudley; Melissa – Composed by Richard Harvey and Steve Baker
Best Original Song for a Film or TV Broadcast	**"Picture of You" from Bean – Written by Paul Wilson, Andy Watkins, Ronan Keating and Eliot Kennedy; Performed by Boyzone**; "Step by Step" from The Preacher's Wife – Written by Annie Lennox; Performed by Whitney Houston; "Surrender" from Tomorrow Never Dies – Written by David Arnold, David McAlmont and Don Black; Performed by k.d. lang
Best Selling UK Single	**"Candle in the Wind 1997" – Written by Elton John and Bernie Taupin; Performed by Elton John**; "I'll Be Missing You" – Written by Sting; Performed by Puff Daddy and Faith Evans featuring 112; "Teletubbies say "Eh-oh!"" – Written by Andrew McCrorie-Shand; Performed by Teletubbies
Best Song Collection	**Texas (Johnny McElhone and Sharleen Spiteri)**
Best Song Musically and Lyrically	**"Paranoid Android" – Written by Thom Yorke, Jonny Greenwood, Phil Selway, Colin Greenwood and Ed O'Brien; Performed by Radiohead**; "Angels" – Written by Robbie Williams and Guy Chambers; Performed by Robbie Williams; "Brimful of Asha" – Written by Tjinder Singh; Performed by Cornershop
International Achievement	**Enya, Nicky Ryan and Roma Ryan**
PRS Most Performed Work	**"I'll Be Missing You" – Written by Sting; Performed by Puff Daddy and Faith Evans featuring 112**; "Black Eyed Boy" – Written by Sharleen Spiteri, Johnny McElhone, Edward Campbell, Richard Hynd and Robert Hodgens; Performed by Texas; "Say What You Want" – Written by Sharleen Spiteri and Johnny McElhone; Performed by Texas
PRS Outstanding Contribution to British Music	**Morrissey**
Songwriter of the Year	**Richard Ashcroft**
The International Hit of the Year	**"Candle in the Wind 1997" – Written by Elton John and Bernie Taupin; Performed by Elton John**; "I'll Be Missing You" – Written by Sting; Performed by Puff Daddy and Faith Evans featuring 112; "Spice Up Your Life" – Written by Richard Stannard, Matt Rowe, Mel B, Victoria Beckham, Geri Halliwell, Emma Bunton and Melanie C; Performed by Spice Girls
The Jimmy Kennedy Award	**Barry Mason**

=== 1999 ===
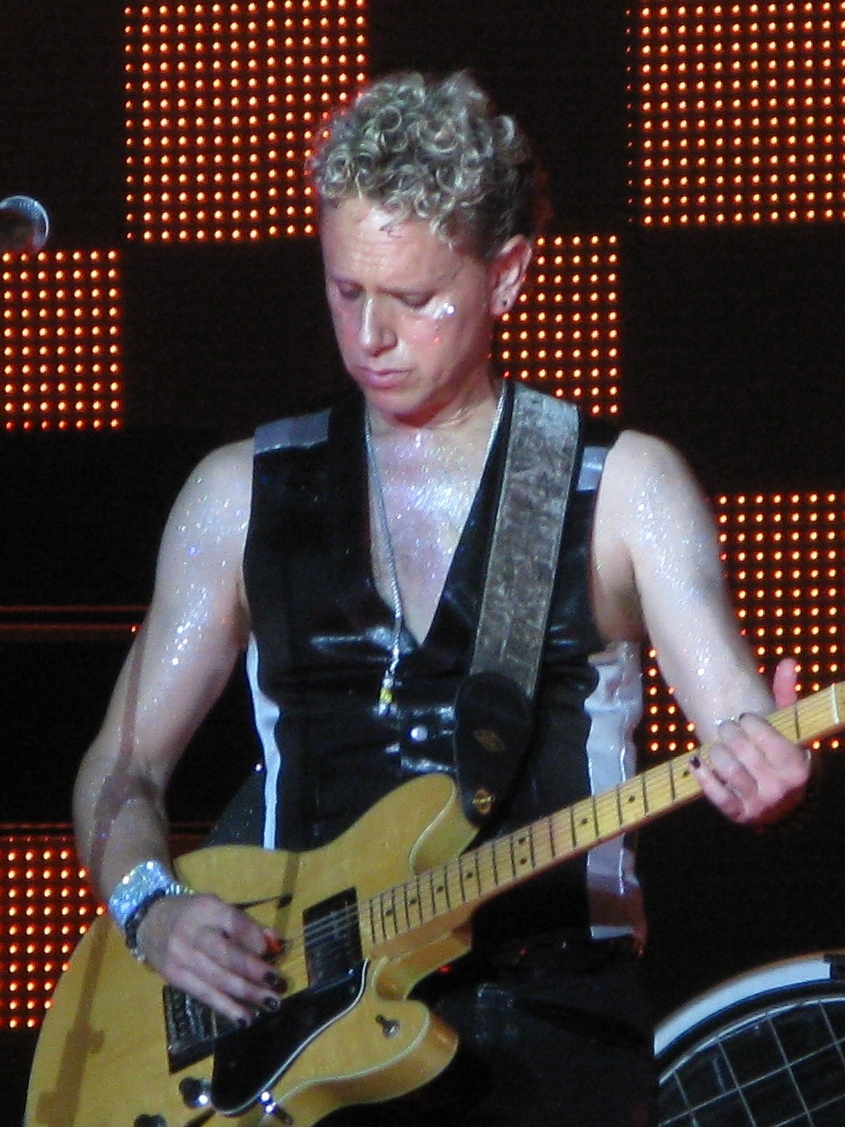
Depeche Mode member Martin Gore received the International Achievement award.

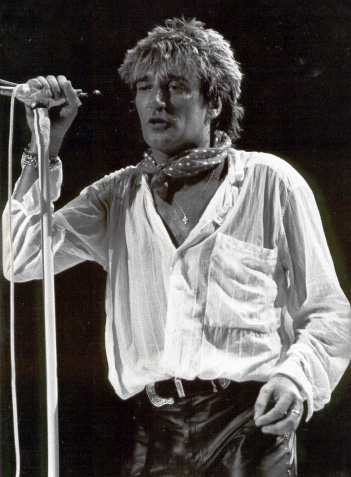
Lifetime Achievement award recipient Rod Stewart

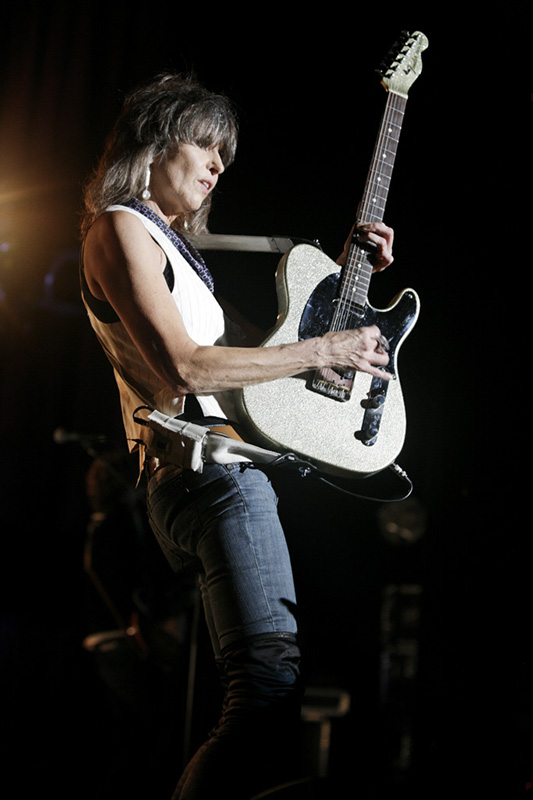
The Pretenders lead singer Chrissie Hynde received the PRS Outstanding Contribution to British Music award.

The 44th Ivors were presented on May 27, 1999 at the Grosvenor House, London.

Category	Recipient and nominees
Best Contemporary Song	**"Here's Where the Story Ends" – Written by Harriet Wheeler and David Gavurin; Performed by The Sundays**; "Road Rage" – Written by Mark Roberts, Cerys Matthews, David Jones, Aled Richards and Owen Powell; Performed by Catatonia; "What Can I Do" – Written by Andrea Corr, Caroline Corr, Sharon Corr and Jim Corr; Performed by The Corrs
Best Original Film Score	**Firelight – Composed by Christopher Gunning**; Dancing at Lughnasa – Composed by Bill Whelan; Ever After – Composed by George Fenton
Best Original Music for a Television/Radio Broadcast	**Close Relations – Composed by Rob Lane**; The Life of Birds – Composed by Steven Faux and Ian Butcher; Selfridges: The Shop – Composed by Barrie Bignold
Best Selling UK Single	**"Believe" – Written by Brian Higgins, Steve Torch, Paul Barry, Stuart McLennan, Tim Powell and Matt Gray; Performed by Cher**; "C'est la Vie" – Written by Tracy Ackerman, Ray Hedges, Martin Brannigan, Edele Lynch, Keavy Lynch, Lindsay Armaou and Sinead O'Carroll; Performed by B*Witched; "No Matter What" – Written by Andrew Lloyd Webber and Jim Steinman
Best Song Commissioned for a Film or Broadcast	**"The Flame Still Burns" from Still Crazy – Written by Chris Difford, Marti Frederiksen and Mick Jones**; "Kipper" from the series of the same name – Written by Robert Heatlie; "Why Won't You Shag Me" from The Young Person's Guide to Becoming a Rock Star – Written by Owen Vyse and Guy Pratt
Best Song Musically and Lyrically	**"Believe" – Written by Brian Higgins, Steve Torch, Paul Barry, Stuart McLennan, Tim Powell and Matt Gray; Performed by Cher**; "C'est la Vie" – Written by Tracy Ackerman, Ray Hedges, Martin Brannigan, Edele Lynch, Keavy Lynch, Lindsay Armaou and Sinead O'Carroll; Performed by B*Witched; "A Little Soul" – Written by Jarvis Cocker, Nick Banks, Candida Doyle, Steve Mackey and Mark Webber; Performed by Pulp
International Achievement	**Martin Gore**
Lifetime Achievement	**Rod Stewart**
Outstanding Song Collection	**Jamiroquai (Wallis Buchanan, Simon Katz, Jay Kay, Derrick McKenzie, Toby Smith and Stuart Zender)**
PRS Most Performed Work	**"Angels" – Written by Robbie Williams and Guy Chambers; Performed by Robbie Williams**; "High" – Written by Paul Tucker and Tunde Baiyewu; Performed by Lighthouse Family; "Never Ever" – Written by Shaznay Lewis, Sean Mather and Esmail Jazayeri; Performed by All Saints
PRS Outstanding Contribution to British Music	**Chrissie Hynde**
Songwriters of the Year	**Guy Chambers and Robbie Williams**
The International Hit of the Year	**"Believe" – Written by Brian Higgins, Steve Torch, Paul Barry, Stuart McLennan, Tim Powell and Matt Gray; Performed by Cher**; "Life" – Written by Des'ree Weekes and Prince Sampson; Performed by Des'ree; "No Matter What" – Written by Andrew Lloyd Webber and Jim Steinman; Performed by Boyzone
The Ivors Dance Award	**"Horny '98" – Written by Mousse T. and Errol Rennalls; Performed by Mousse T. featuring Hot 'n' Juicy and Inaya Day**; "I Can't Help Myself" – Written by Mark Hadfield and Adam Ryan Carter; Performed by Lucid; "Sing It Back" – Written by Mark Brydon and Róisín Murphy; Performed by Moloko
The Jimmy Kennedy Award	**Peter Callander and Mitch Murray**
The Special International Award	**Hal David**

== 2000s ==
=== 2000 ===
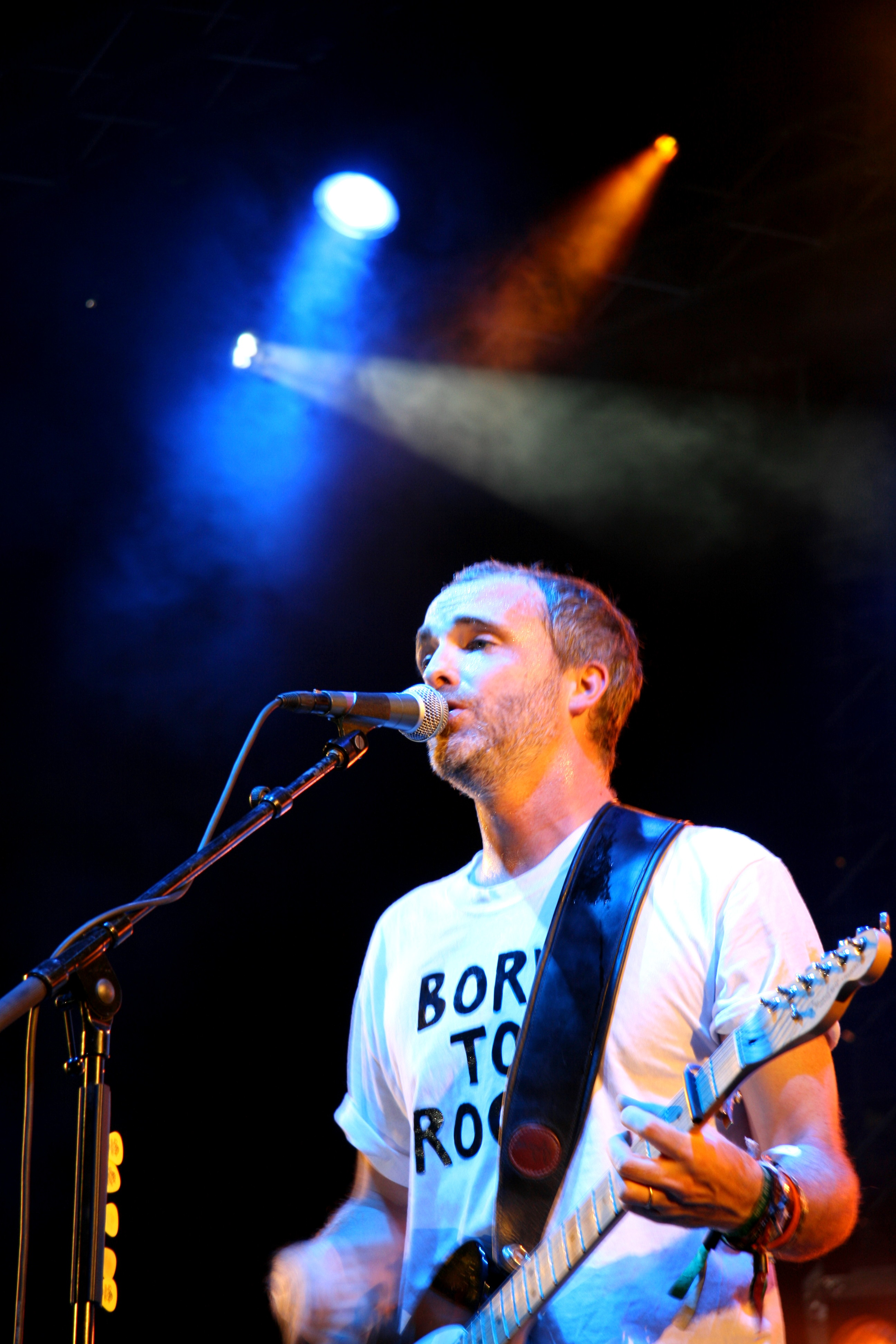
Travis lead singer Fran Healy received two awards, including Songwriter of the Year.

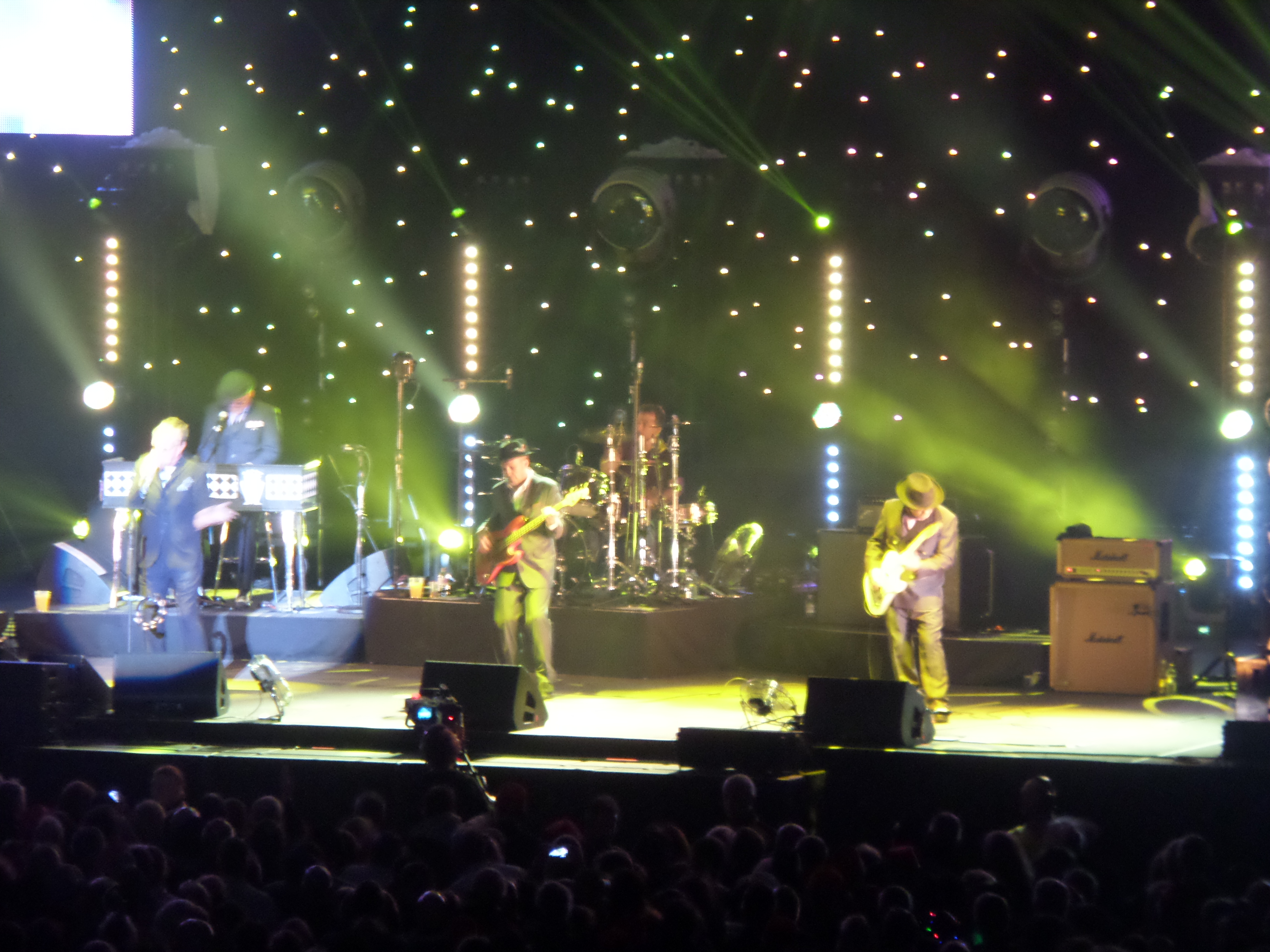
Madness members Mike Barson, Mark Bedford, Chris Foreman, Cathal Skyth, Suggs, Lee Thompson and Dan Woodgate won Outstanding Song Collection.

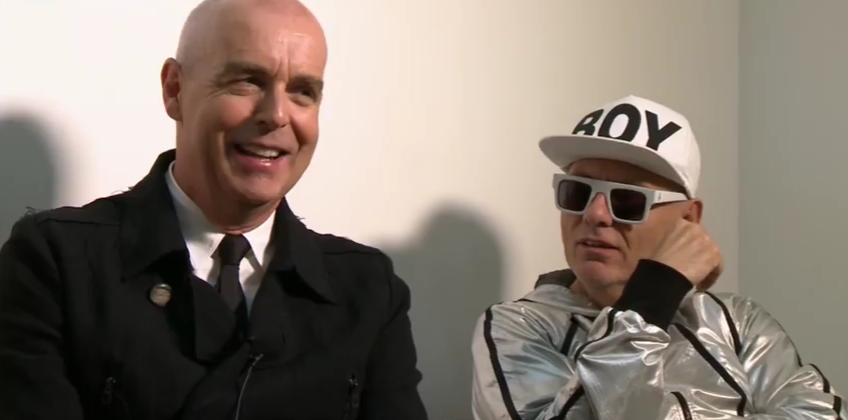
Chris Lowe and Neil Tennant from Pet Shop Boys won the PRS Outstanding Contribution to British Music award.

The 45th Ivor Novello Awards were presented on May 25, 2000 at the Grosvenor House, London.

Category	Recipient and nominees
Best Contemporary Song	**"Why Does It Always Rain on Me?" – Written by Fran Healy; Performed by Travis**; "Beautiful Stranger" – Written by William Orbit and Madonna; Performed by Madonna; "Rise" – Written by Gabrielle, Bob Dylan, Ferdy Unger-Hamilton and Ollie Dagois; Performed by Gabrielle
Best Original Film Score	**The World Is Not Enough – Composed by David Arnold**; Anna and the King – Composed by George Fenton; Shakespeare in Love – Composed by Stephen Warbeck
Best Original Music for a TV/Radio Broadcast	**Trial by Fire – Composed by Richard G. Mitchell**; An Evil Streak – Composed by Stanislav Syrewicz; Bad Blood – Composed by John Lunn
Best Selling UK Single	**"The Millennium Prayer" – Written by Paul Field and Stephen Deal; Performed by Cliff Richard**; "Sweet like Chocolate" – Written by Stephen Meade and Daniel Langsman; Performed by Shanks & Bigfoot; "That Don't Impress Me Much" – Written by Mutt Lange and Shania Twain; Performed by Shania Twain
Best Song Musically and Lyrically	**"Strong" – Written by Robbie Williams and Guy Chambers; Performed by Robbie Williams**; "Genie in a Bottle" – Written by Pam Sheyne, David Frank and Steve Kipner; Performed by Christina Aguilera; "You're Still the One" – Written by Mutt Lange and Shania Twain; Performed by Shania Twain
International Achievement in Musical Theatre	**Robert Elhai, Elton John, Lebo M, Tsidii Le Loka, Mark Mancina, Jay Rifkin, Tim Rice, Julie Taymor and Hans Zimmer**
International Hit of the Year	**"Genie in a Bottle" – Written by Pam Sheyne, David Frank and Steve Kipner; Performed by Christina Aguilera**; "Ray of Light" – Written by Madonna, William Orbit, Christine Leach, Clive Muldoon and Dave Curtis; Performed by Madonna; "That Don't Impress Me Much" – Written by Mutt Lange and Shania Twain; Performed by Shania Twain
Outstanding Song Collection	**Madness (Mike Barson, Mark Bedford, Chris Foreman, Cathal Skyth, Suggs, Lee Thompson and Dan Woodgate)**
PRS Most Performed Work	**"Beautiful Stranger" – Written by William Orbit and Madonna; Performed by Madonna**; "Strong" – Written by Robbie Williams and Guy Chambers; "That Don't Impress Me Much" – Written by Mutt Lange and Shania Twain; Performed by Shania Twain
PRS Outstanding Contribution to British Music	**Pet Shop Boys (Chris Lowe and Neil Tennant)**
Songwriter of the Year	**Fran Healy**
The Ivors Dance Award	**"Re-Rewind" – Written by Mark Hill and Craig David; Performed by Artful Dodger featuring Craig David**; "Rendez-Vu" – Written by Felix Buxton and Simon Ratcliffe; Performed by Basement Jaxx; "Sweet like Chocolate" – Written by Stephen Meade and Daniel Langsman; Performed by Shanks & Bigfoot
The Jimmy Kennedy Award	**Geoff Stephens**
The Special International Award	**Jerry Leiber and Mike Stoller**

=== 2001 ===
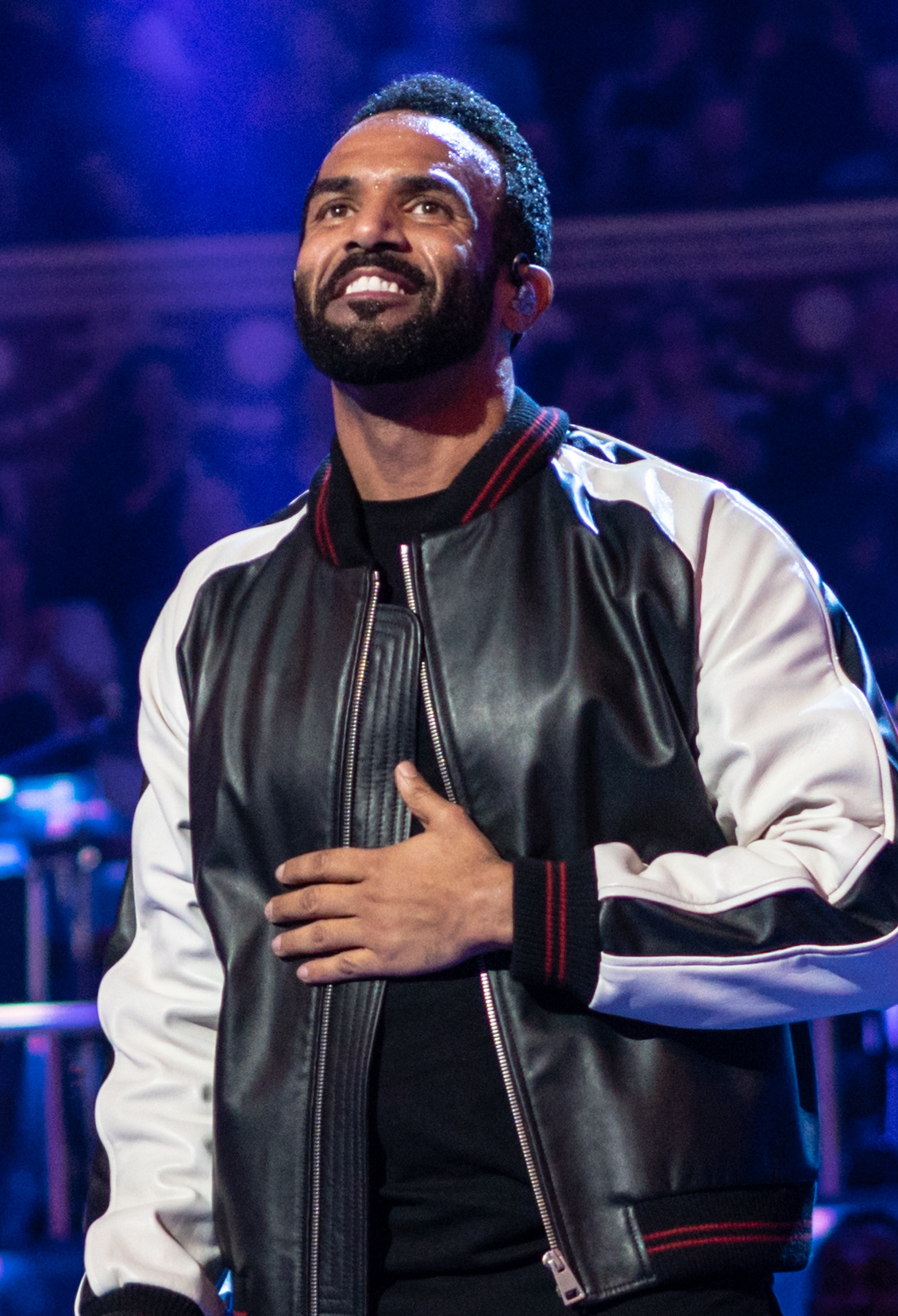
Singer Craig David won three awards, including Songwriter of the Year alongside Mark Hill.

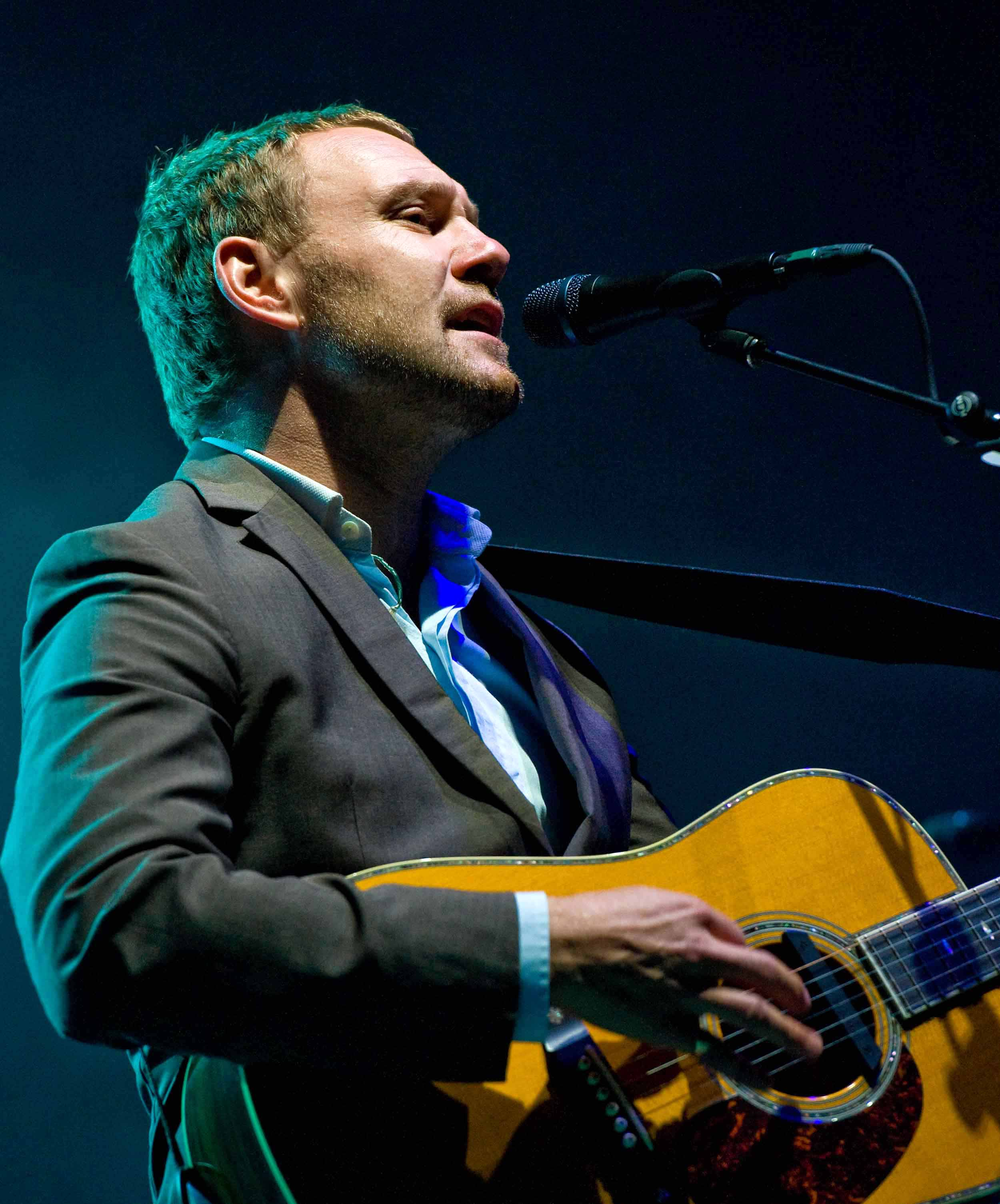
David Gray won Best Song Musically and Lyrically for "Babylon".

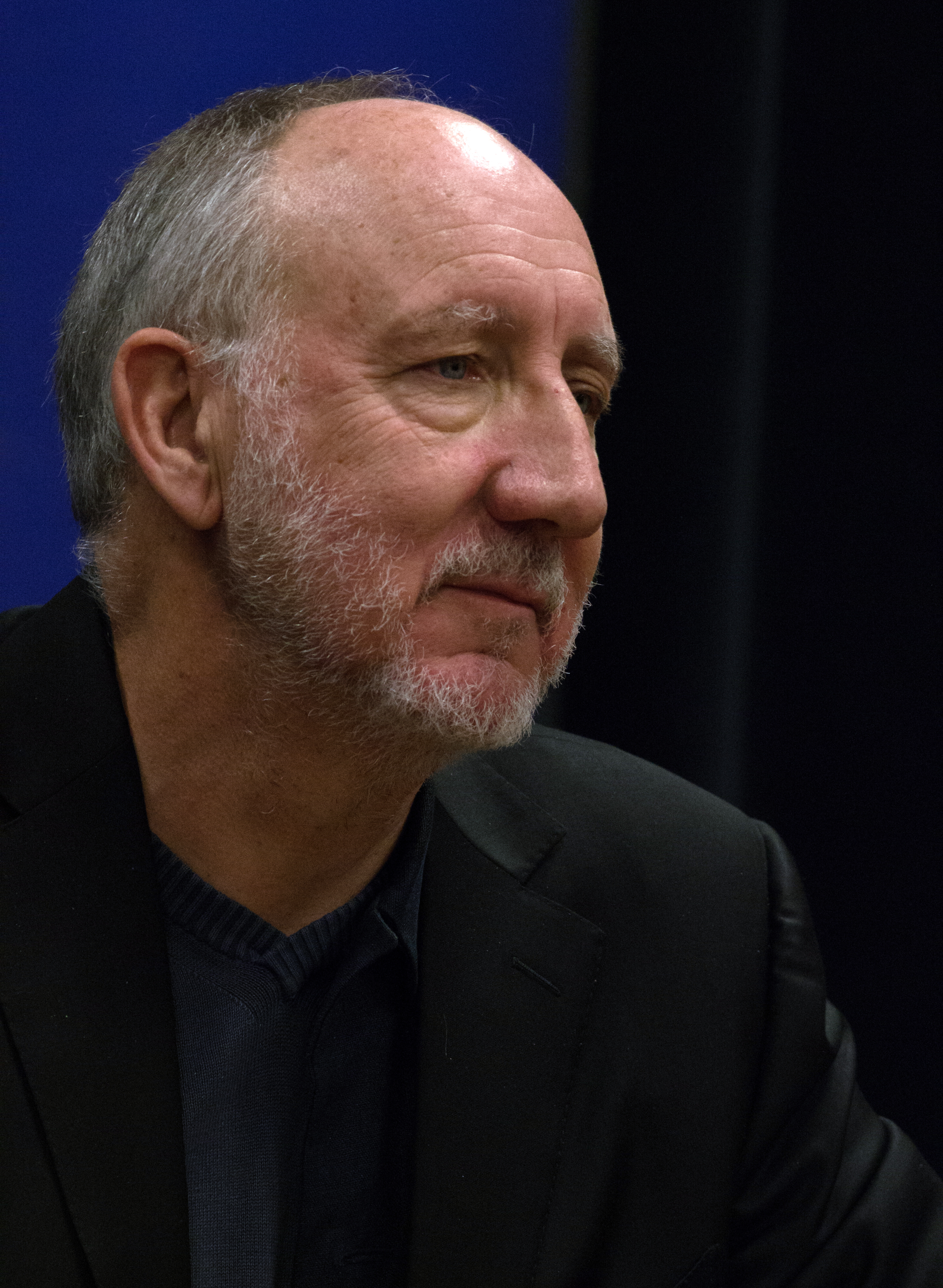
Lifetime Achievement award recipient Pete Townshend

The 46th Ivor Novello Awards were presented on May 24, 2001 at the Grosvenor House, London.

Category	Recipient and nominees
Best Contemporary Song	**"7 Days" – Written by Craig David, Mark Hill and Darren Hill; Performed by Craig David**; "Beautiful Day" – Written by Bono, The Edge, Larry Mullen Jr. and Adam Clayton; Performed by U2; "Please Forgive Me" – Written and performed by David Gray
Best Original Score	**X-Men – Composed by Michael Kamen**; Chicken Run – Composed by John Powell and Harry Gregson-Williams; Gangster No. 1 – Composed by John Dankworth
Best Original Music for a Television/Radio Broadcast	**Gormenghast – Composed by Richard Rodney Bennett**; Randall & Hopkirk (Deceased) – Composed by David Arnold and Tim Simenon; The Wyvern Mystery – Composed by Philip Appleby
Best Selling UK Single	**"Can We Fix It?" – Written by Paul Joyce; Performed by Bob the Builder**; "It Feels So Good" – Written by Sonique, Linus Burdick, Simon Belofsky and Graeme Pleeth; Performed by Sonique; "Pure Shores" – Written by Shaznay Lewis and William Orbit; Performed by All Saints
Best Song Musically and Lyrically	**"Babylon" – Written and performed by David Gray**; "Never Had a Dream Come True" – Written by Cathy Dennis and Simon Ellis; Performed by S Club 7; "Trouble" – Written by Guy Berryman, Jonny Buckland, Will Champion and Chris Martin; Performed by Coldplay
International Achievement	**Iron Maiden (Bruce Dickinson, Janick Gers, Steve Harris, Nicko McBrain, Dave Murray and Adrian Smith)**
International Hit of the Year	**"It Feels So Good" – Written by Sonique, Linus Burdick, Simon Belofsky and Graeme Pleeth; Performed by Sonique**; "I Turn to You" – Written by Melanie C, Rick Nowels and Billy Steinberg; Performed by Melanie C; "Sex Bomb" – Written by Errol Rennalls and Mousse T.; Performed by Tom Jones and Mousse T.
Lifetime Achievement	**Pete Townshend**
Outstanding Song Collection	**Roy Wood**
PRS Most Performed Work	**"Pure Shores" – Written by Shaznay Lewis and William Orbit; Performed by All Saints**; "Rise" – Written by Gabrielle, Ollie Dagois, Ferdy Unger Hamilton and Bob Dylan; Performed by Gabrielle; "Rock DJ" – Written by Ekundayo Paris, Nelson Pigford, Robbie Williams, Guy Chambers and Kelvin Andrews; Performed by Robbie Williams
PRS Outstanding Contribution to British Music	**The Clash (Topper Headon, Mick Jones, Paul Simonon and Joe Strummer)**
Songwriters of the Year	**Craig David and Mark Hill**
The Ivors Dance Award	**"Girls Like Us" – Written by Ali Campbell, Brian Travers, Dawnette Nevers, Janice Fyffe and Haldane Browne; Performed by B-15 Project featuring Crissy D and Lady G**; "The Time Is Now" – Written by Róisín Murphy and Mark Brydon; Performed by Moloko; "Woman Trouble" – Written by Mark Hill, Craig David, Robbie Craig and Pete Devereux; Performed by Artful Dodger and Robbie Craig featuring Craig David
The Special International Achievement	**Stevie Wonder**

=== 2002 ===
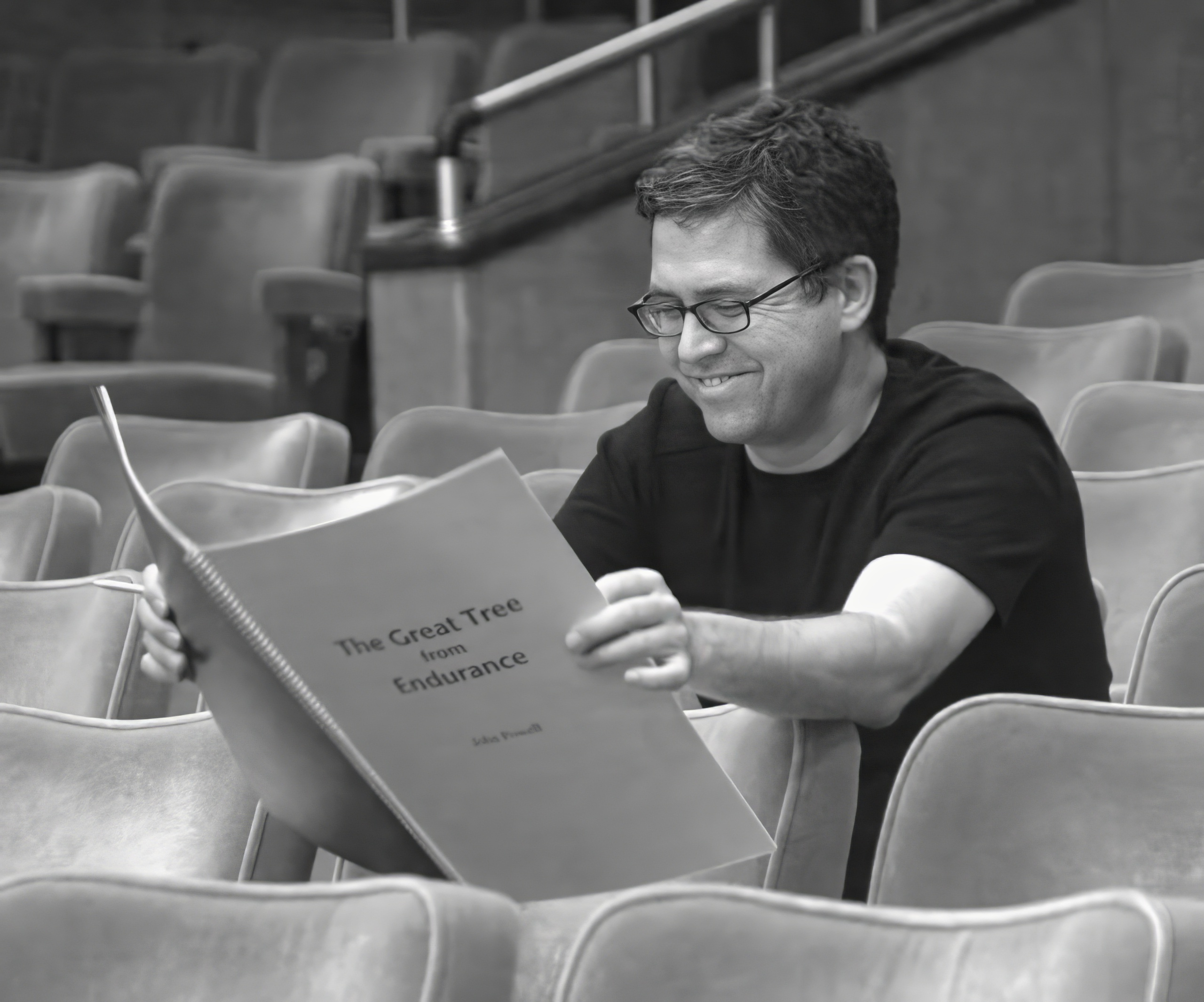
John Powell (pictured) won Best Original Score alongside Harry Gregson-Williams for the film Shrek.

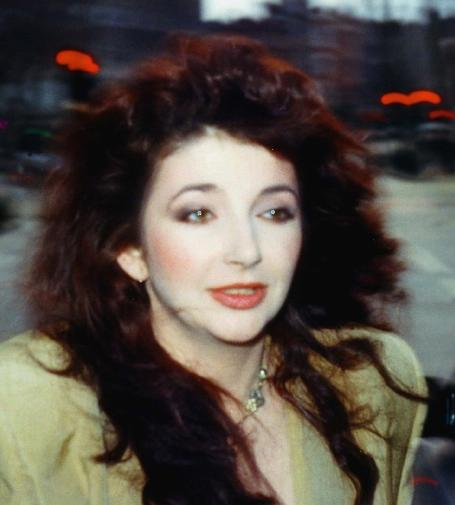
English singer Kate Bush received the PRS Outstanding Contribution to British Music award.

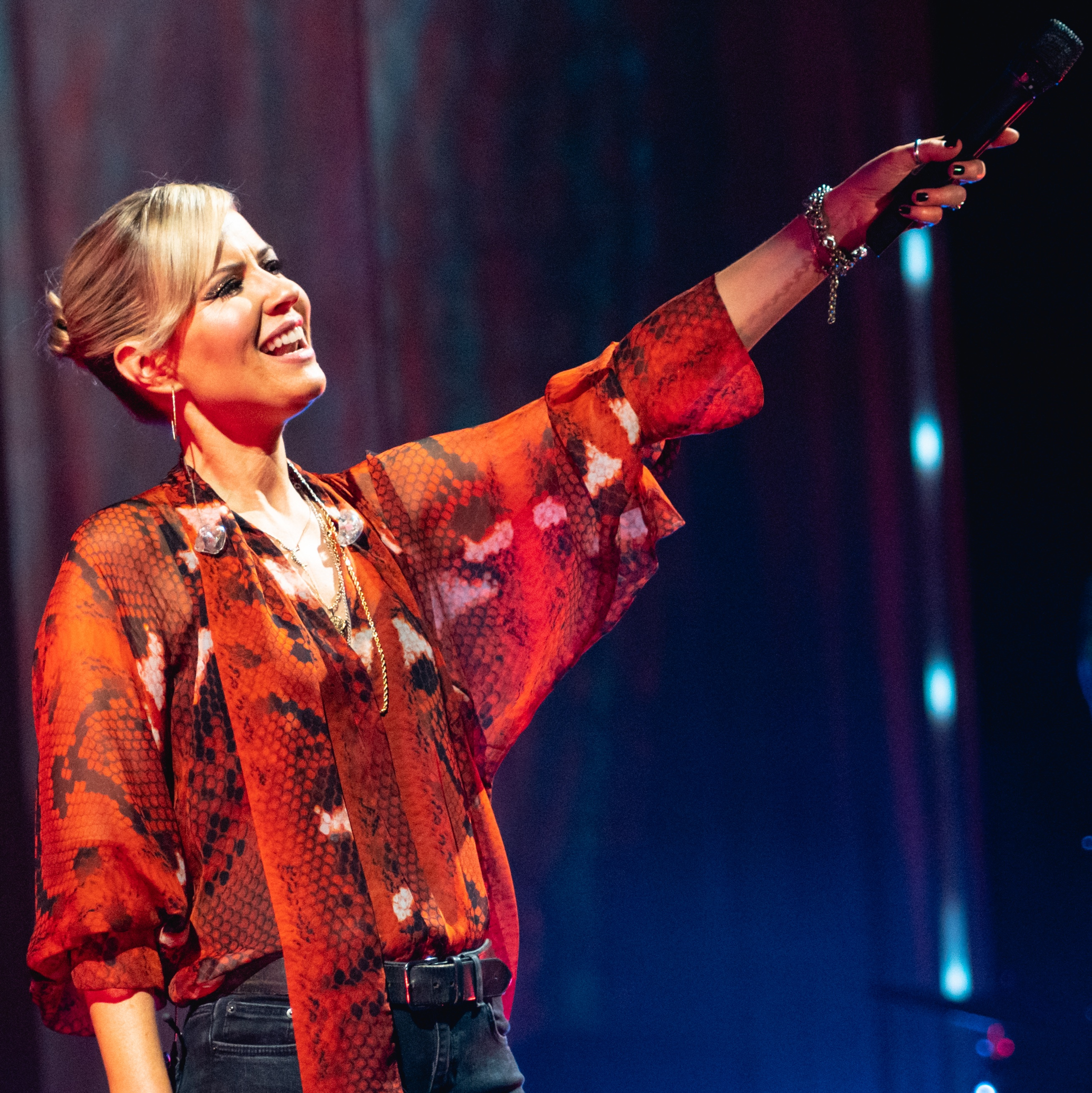
Songwriter of the Year recipient Dido

The 47th Ivor Novello Awards were presented on May 23, 2002 at the Grosvenor House, London.

Category	Recipient and nominees
Best Contemporary Song	**"Shining Light" – Written by Tim Wheeler; Performed by Ash**; "Clint Eastwood" – Written by Damon Albarn, Jamie Hewlett and Teren Delvon Jones; Performed by Gorillaz featuring Del the Funky Homosapien; "Thank You" – Written by Dido Armstrong and Paul Herman; Performed by Dido
Best Original Film Score	**Shrek – Composed by Harry Gregson-Williams and John Powell**; Quills – Composed by Stephen Warbeck; Thirteen Days – Composed by Trevor Jones
Best Original Music for a Television/Radio Broadcast	**The Blue Planet – Composed by George Fenton**; Band of Brothers – Composed by Michael Kamen; Wild Africa – Composed by Christopher Gunning
Best Selling UK Single	**"Pure and Simple" – Written by Pete Kirtley, Tim Hawes and Alison Clarkson; Performed by Hear'Say**; "Can't Get You Out of My Head" – Written by Cathy Dennis and Rob Davis; Performed by Kylie Minogue; "Whole Again" – Written by Andy McCluskey, Stuart Kershaw, Bill Padley and Jeremy Godfrey; Performed by Atomic Kitten
Best Song Musically and Lyrically	**"Walk On" – Written by Adam Clayton, The Edge, Bono and Larry Mullen Jr.; Performed by U2**; "Sail Away" – Written and performed by David Gray; "Side" – Written by Fran Healy; Performed by Travis
International Achievement	**Sting**
International Hit of the Year	**"Can't Get You Out of My Head" – Written by Cathy Dennis and Rob Davis; Performed by Kylie Minogue**; "Hero" – Written by Paul Barry, Enrique Iglesias and Mark Taylor; Performed by Enrique Iglesias; "Whole Again" – Written by Andy McCluskey, Stuart Kershaw, Bill Padley and Jeremy Godfrey; Performed by Atomic Kitten
Outstanding Song Collection	**Mick Hucknall**
PRS Most Performed Work	**"Can't Get You Out of My Head" – Written by Cathy Dennis and Rob Davis; Performed by Kylie Minogue**; "Thank You" – Written by Dido Armstrong and Paul Herman; Performed by Dido; "Out of Reach" – Written by Gabrielle and Jonathan Shorten; Performed by Gabrielle
PRS Outstanding Contribution to British Music	**Kate Bush**
Songwriter of the Year	**Dido Armstrong**
The Ivors Dance Award	**"Can't Get You Out of My Head" – Written by Cathy Dennis and Rob Davis; Performed by Kylie Minogue**; "Do You Really Like It?" – Written by Eugene Nwohia, Ronald Nwohia, Paul Newman, Ashley Livingston and Steve Wickham; Performed by DJ Pied Piper and the Masters of Ceremonies; "Where's Your Head At" – Written by Felix Buxton, Simon Ratcliffe and Gary Numan; Performed by Basement Jaxx
The Special International Award	**Benny Andersson and Björn Ulvaeus**

=== 2003 ===
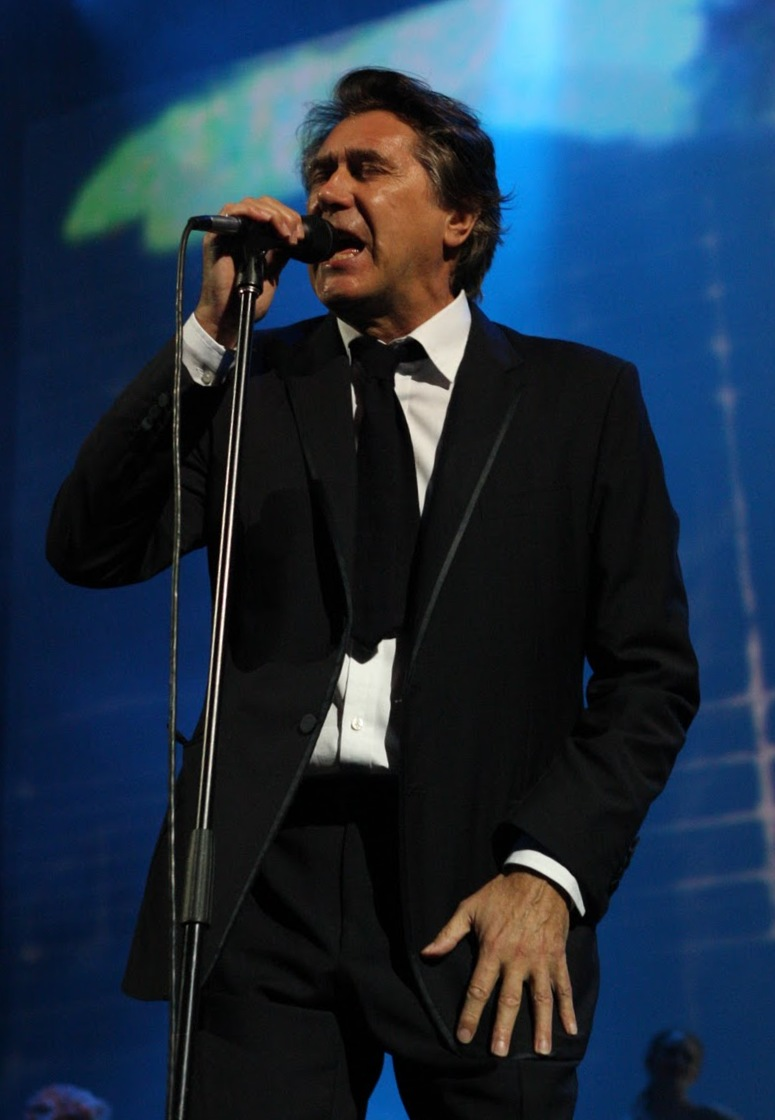
Bryan Ferry received the Outstanding Contribution to British Music award.

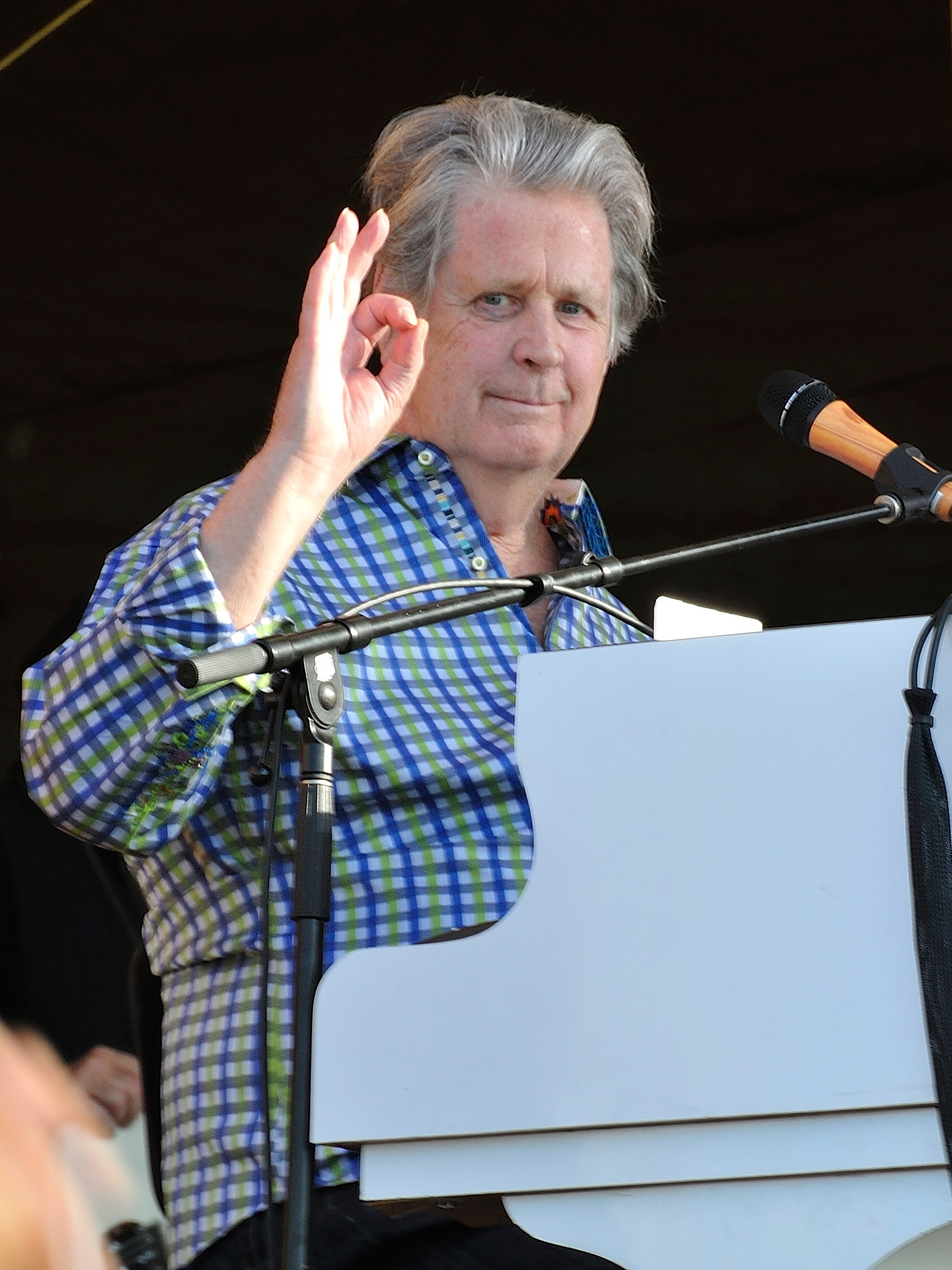
Brian Wilson received the Special International Award.

The 48th Ivor Novello Awards were presented on May 22, 2003 at the Grosvenor House, London.

Category	Recipient and nominees
Best Contemporary Song	**"Weak Become Heroes" – Written by Mike Skinner; Performed by The Streets**; "In My Place" – Written by Guy Berryman, Jonny Buckland, Will Champion and Chris Martin; Performed by Coldplay; "It Takes More" – Written by Ms. Dynamite and Punch; Performed by Ms. Dynamite
Best Original Film Score	**The Quiet American – Composed by Craig Armstrong**; Die Another Day – Composed by David Arnold; Rabbit-Proof Fence – Composed by Peter Gabriel
Best Original Music for Television	**Feltham Sings – Composed by Dextrous and Simon Armitage**; Natural World ("Danger in Tiger Paradise") – Composed by David Mitcham; Goodbye, Mr. Chips – Composed by Colin Towns
Best Selling UK Single	**"Anything is Possible" – Written by Cathy Dennis and Chris Braide; Performed by Will Young**; "Hero" – Written by Paul Barry, Enrique Iglesias and Mark Taylor; Performed by Enrique Iglesias; "Just a Little" – Written by Michelle Escoffery, John Hammond Hagan and George Hammond Hagan; Performed by Liberty X
Best Song Musically and Lyrically	**"The Other Side" – Written and performed by David Gray**; "Stop Crying Your Heart Out" – Written by Noel Gallagher; Performed by Oasis; "Strange & Beautiful (I'll Put A Spell On You)" – Written by Matthew Hales and Kim Oliver; Performed by Aqualung
International Achievement	**UB40 (Astro, James Brown, Ali Campbell, Robin Campbell, Earl Falconer, Norman Hassan, Brian Travers and Michael Virtue)**
International Hit of the Year	**"Complicated" – Written by Lauren Christy, David Alspach, Graham Edwards and Avril Lavigne; Performed by Avril Lavigne**; "Electrical Storm" – Written by Adam Clayton, The Edge, Bono and Larry Mullen Jr.; Performed by U2; "Feel" – Written by Robbie Williams and Guy Chambers; Performed by Robbie Williams
Outstanding Song Collection	**U2 (Adam Clayton, The Edge, Bono and Larry Mullen Jr.)**
PRS Most Performed Work	**"Just a Little" – Written by Michelle Escoffery, John Hammond Hagan and George Hammond Hagan; Performed by Liberty X**; "In Your Eyes" – Written by Kylie Minogue, Richard Stannard, Julian Gallagher and Ashley Howes; Performed by Kylie Minogue; "Love at First Sight" – Written by Kylie Minogue, Richard Stannard, Julian Gallagher, Ashley Howes and Martin Harrington; Performed by Kylie Minogue
PRS Outstanding Contribution to British Music	**Bryan Ferry**
Songwriters of the Year	**Coldplay (Guy Berryman, Jonny Buckland, Will Champion and Chris Martin)**
The Ivors Classical Music Award	**"Boots of Lead" – Composed by Simon Holt**; "Dead March" – Composed by Gerald Barry; "Sophie's Choice" – Composed by Nicholas Maw
The Ivors Dance Award	**"Lazy" – Written by Ashley Beedle, Darren House, Darren Rock and David Byrne; Performed by X-Press 2 featuring David Byrne**; "It Just Won't Do" – Written by Tim Liken and Ben Onono; Performed by Tim Deluxe; "Shake Your Body" – Written by Andre Williams and Dianna Joseph; Performed by Shy FX and T Power featuring Di
The Special International Award	**Brian Wilson**

=== 2004 ===
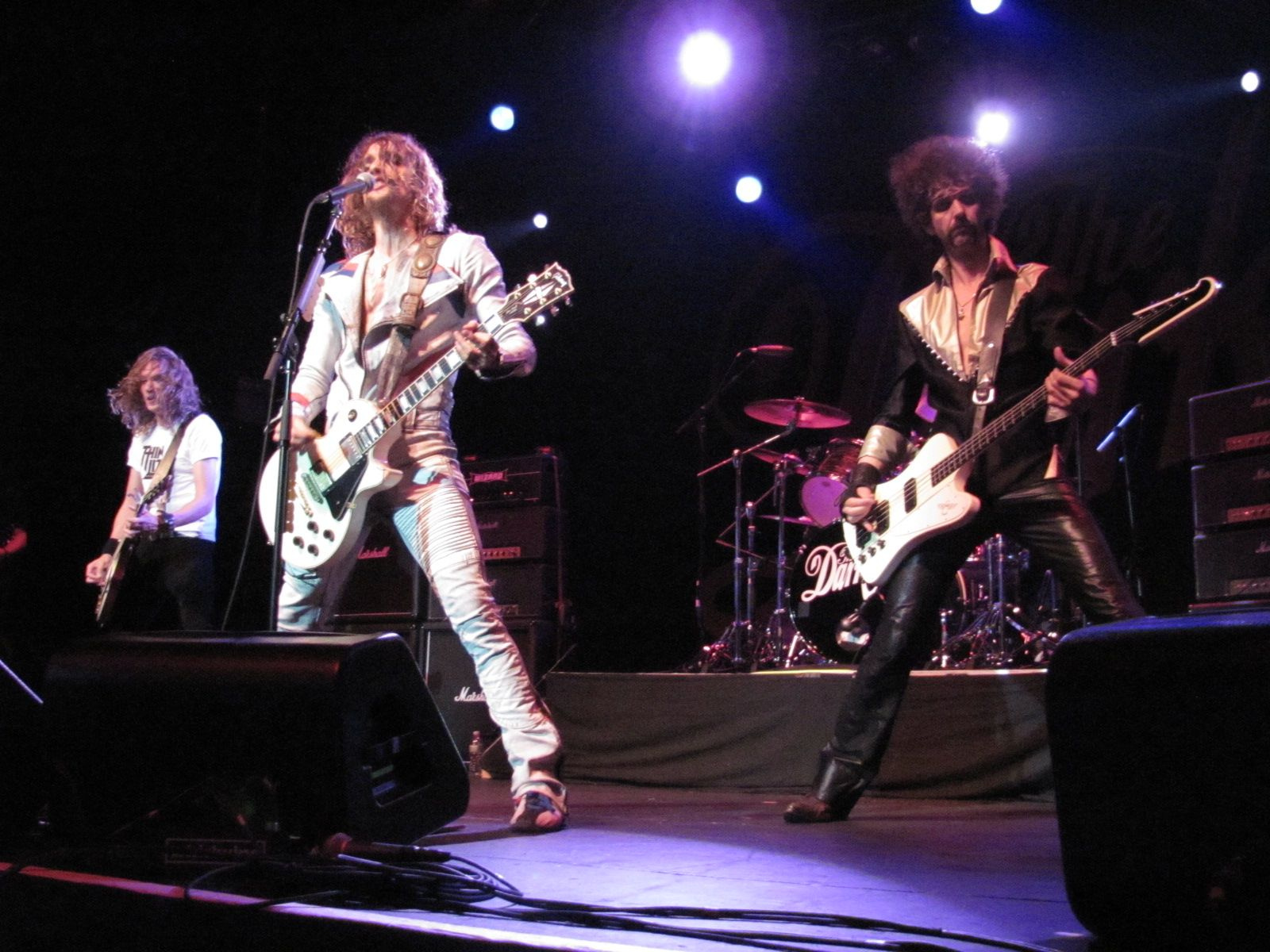
British band The Darkness won the Songwriter of the Year award.

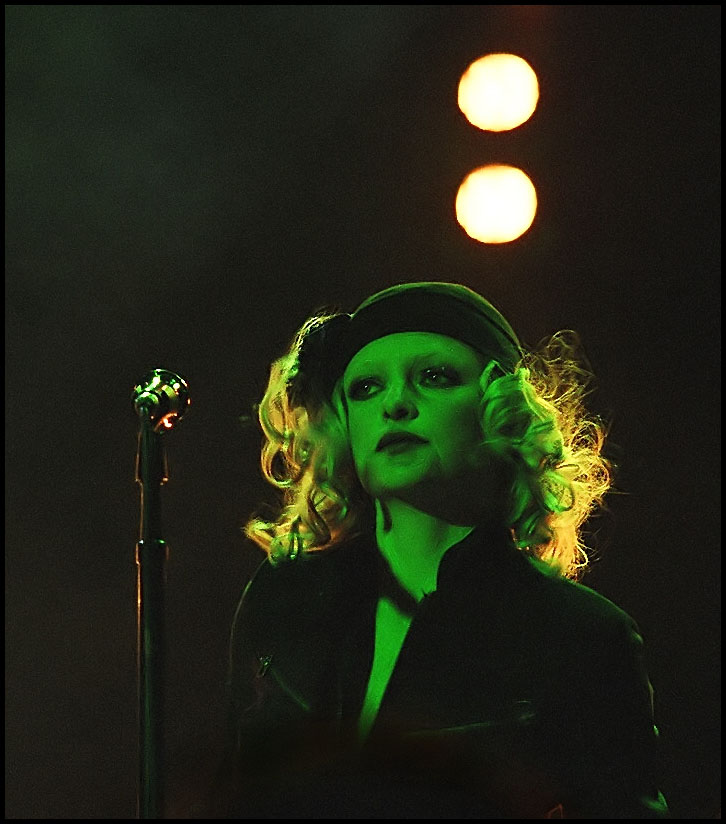
Alison Goldfrapp (pictures), Will Gregory and Nick Batt won The Ivors Dance Award.

The 49th Ivor Novello Awards were presented on May 27, 2004 at the Grosvenor House, London.

Category	Recipient and nominees
Best Contemporary Song	**"Stronger Than Me" – Written by Amy Winehouse and Salaam Remi; Performed by Amy Winehouse**; "Jus' a Rascal" – Written by Dylan Mills, Tesmond Rowe and Vegard Vardoen; Performed by Dizzee Rascal; "Slow" – Written by Dan Carey, Emiliana Torrini and Kylie Minogue; Performed by Kylie Minogue
Best Original Film Score	**Max – Composed by Dan Jones**; Bodysong – Composed by Jonny Greenwood; In America – Composed by Gavin Friday and Maurice Seezer
Best Original Music for Television	**The Young Visiters – Composed by Nicholas Hooper**; The Key – Composed by Anne Dudley; Second Generation – Composed by Nitin Sawhney
Best Song Musically and Lyrically	**"Leave Right Now" – Written by Francis Eg White; Performed by Will Young**; "Step into My Office, Baby" – Written by Stuart Murdoch, Stephen Jackson, Christopher Geddes, Richard Colburn, Michael Cooke, Sarah Martin and Robert Kildea; Performed by Belle and Sebastian; "White Flag" – Written by Dido Armstrong, Rollo Armstrong and Richard Nowels; Performed by Dido
International Achievement	**Radiohead**
International Hit of the Year	**"White Flag" – Written by Dido Armstrong, Rollo Armstrong and Richard Nowels; Performed by Dido**; "Slow" – Written by Dan Carey, Emiliana Torrini and Kylie Minogue; Performed by Kylie Minogue; "Feel" – Written by Robbie Williams and Guy Chambers; Performed by Robbie Williams
Outstanding Song Collection	**10cc (Lol Creme, Kevin Godley, Graham Gouldman and Eric Stewart)**
PRS Most Performed Work	**"Superstar" – Written by Mich Hansen, Joseph Belmaati and Mikkel Sigvardt, Performed by Christine Milton**; "Clocks" – Written by Guy Berryman, Jonny Buckland, Will Champion and Chris Martin; Performed by Coldplay; "Hole in the Head" – Written by Miranda Cooper, Brian Higgins, Timothy Powell, Nicholas Coler, Niara Scarlett, Keisha Buchanan, Mutya Buena and Heidi Range; Performed by Sugababes
PRS Outstanding Contribution to British Music	**Errol Brown**
Songwriters of the Year	**The Darkness (Justin Hawkins, Dan Hawkins, Frankie Poullain and Ed Graham)**
The Ivors Classical Music Award	**Richard Rodney Bennett**
The Ivors Dance Award	**"Strict Machine" – Written by Alison Goldfrapp, Will Gregory and Nick Batt; Performed by Goldfrapp**; "Familiar Feeling" – Written by Róisín Murphy, Mark Brydon and Edmond Stevens; Performed by Moloko; "Shining Through" – Written by Layo Paskin and Matthew Benjamin; Performed by Layo & Bushwacka!
The Special International Achievement	**Brian Holland, Lamont Dozier and Eddie Holland**

=== 2005 ===
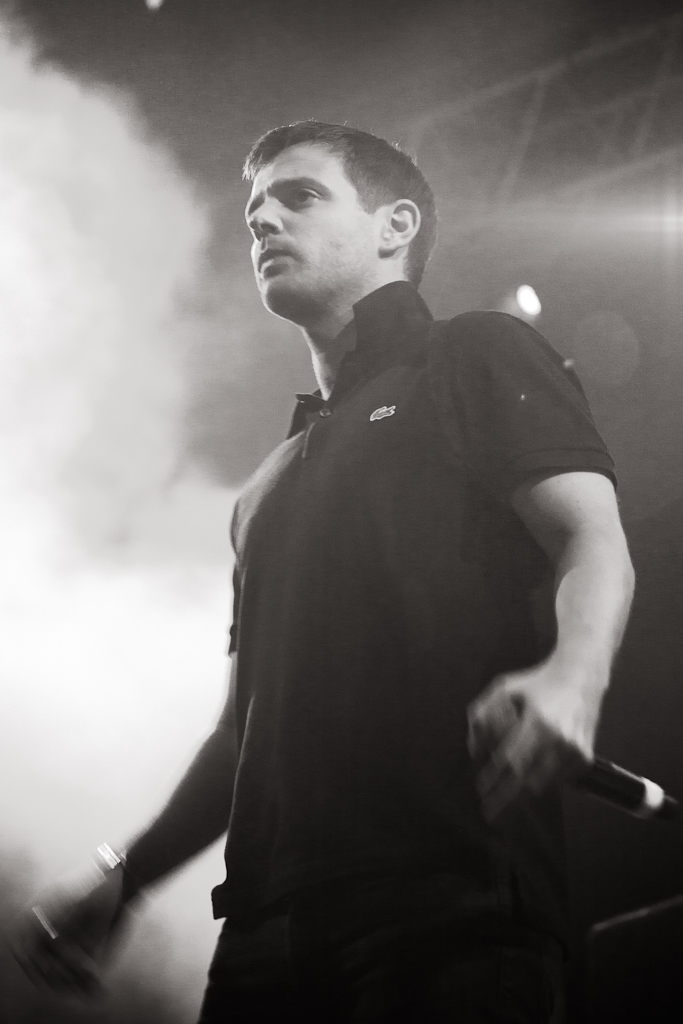
Mike Skinner from the music project The Streets won Best Song, Musically and Lyrically.

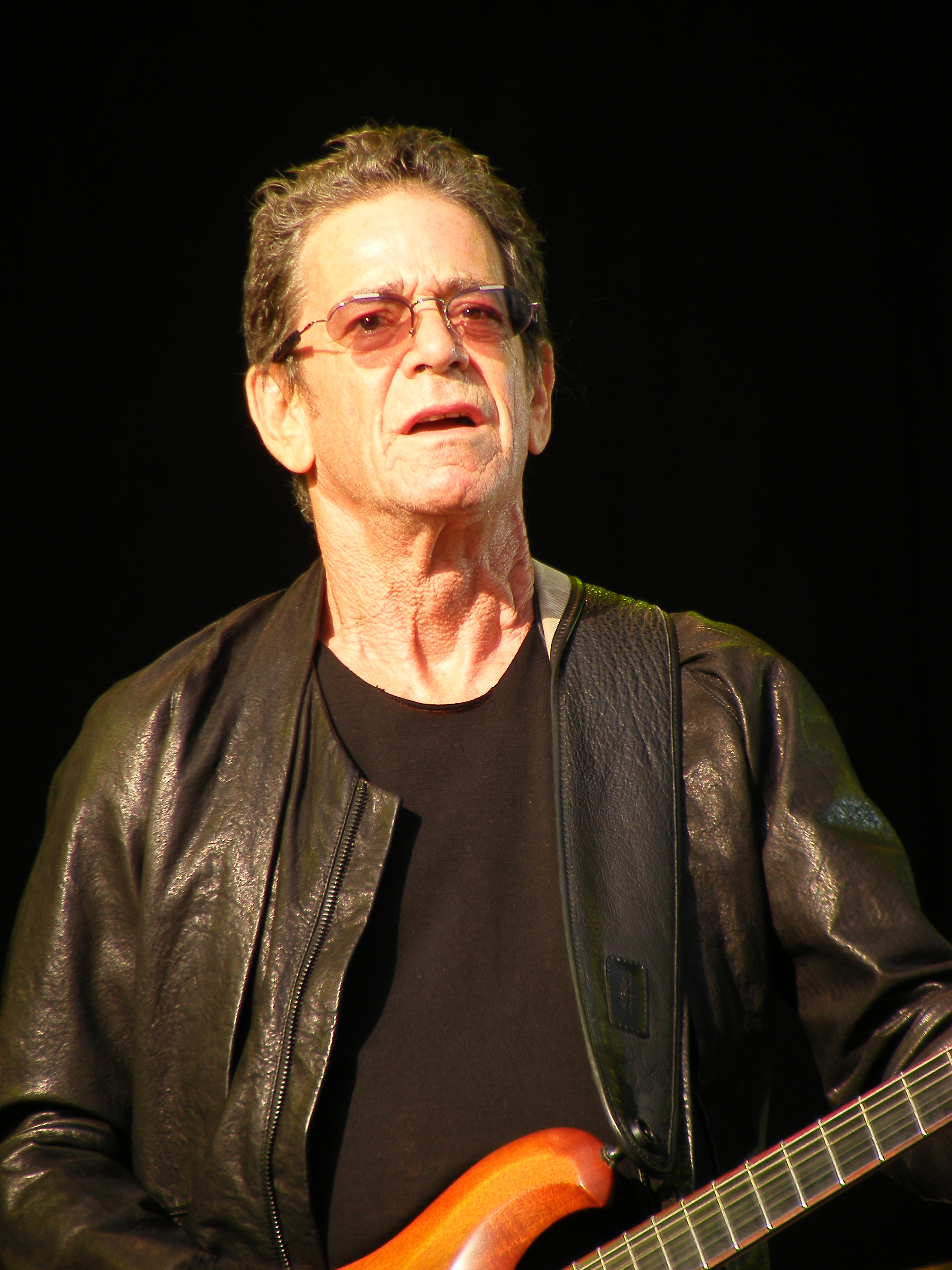
Lou Reed received the Special International Award.

The 50th Ivor Novello Awards were presented on May 26, 2005 at the Grosvenor House, London.

Category	Recipient and nominees
Album Award	**Final Straw – Written by Iain Archer, Nathan Connolly, Gary Lightbody, Mark McClelland and Jonny Quinn; Performed by Snow Patrol**
Best Contemporary Song	**"Take Me Out" – Written by Robert Hardy, Alex Kapranos, Nick McCarthy and Paul Thomson; Performed by Franz Ferdinand**; "Blinded by the Lights" – Written by Mike Skinner; Performed by The Streets; "For Lovers" – Written by Peter Wolfe, Pete Doherty, Julian Taylor, Edmund Scott, Matt White, David Banks and Matt Scott; Performed by Wolfman featuring Pete Doherty
Best Original Film Score	**Enduring Love – Composed by Jeremy Sams**; Deep Blue – Composed by George Fenton; Man on Fire – Composed by Harry Gregson-Williams
Best Original Music for Television	**Blackpool – Composed by Rob Lane**; Fallen – Composed by Paul Leonard-Morgan; North & South – Composed by Martin Phipps
Best Selling UK Single	**"Do They Know It's Christmas?" – Written by Bob Geldof and Midge Ure; Performed by Band Aid 20**; "All This Time" – Written by Wayne Hector, Steve Mac and Ali Tennant; Performed by Michelle McManus; "Call on Me" – Written by Steve Winwood, Eric Prydz and Will Jennings; Performed by Eric Prydz
Best Song, Musically and Lyrically	**"Dry Your Eyes" – Written by Mike Skinner; Performed by The Streets**; "Everybody's Changing" – Written by Tom Chaplin, Richard Hughes and Tim Rice-Oxley; Performed by Keane; "These Words" – Written by Stephen Kipner, Andrew Frampton, Natasha Bedingfield and Wayne Wilkins; Performed by Natasha Bedingfield
International Achievement	**Robert Smith**
International Hit of the Year	**"Vertigo" – Written by Bono, The Edge, Adam Clayton and Larry Mullen Jr.; Performed by U2**; "Do They Know It's Christmas?" – Written by Bob Geldof and Midge Ure; Performed by Band Aid 20; "Behind Blue Eyes" – Written by Pete Townshend; Performed by Limp Bizkit
Outstanding Song Collection	**Queen (Brian May, Roger Taylor, Freddie Mercury and John Deacon)**
PRS Most Performed Work	**"Toxic" – Written by Cathy Dennis, Bloodshy, Henrik Jonback and Avant; Performed by Britney Spears**; "Amazing" – Written by George Michael and Jonathan Douglas; Performed by George Michael; "Thank You" – Written by Jamelia Davies, Carsten Schack and Peter Biker; Performed by Jamelia
PRS Outstanding Contribution to British Music	**Duran Duran (Simon Le Bon, Nick Rhodes, Andy Taylor, John Taylor and Roger Taylor)**
Songwriters of the Year	**Keane (Tom Chaplin, Richard Hughes and Tim Rice-Oxley)**
The Ivors Classical Award	**John Tavener**
The Ivors Special Award for Songwriting	**Mick Jagger and Keith Richards**
The Special International Award	**Lou Reed**

=== 2006 ===
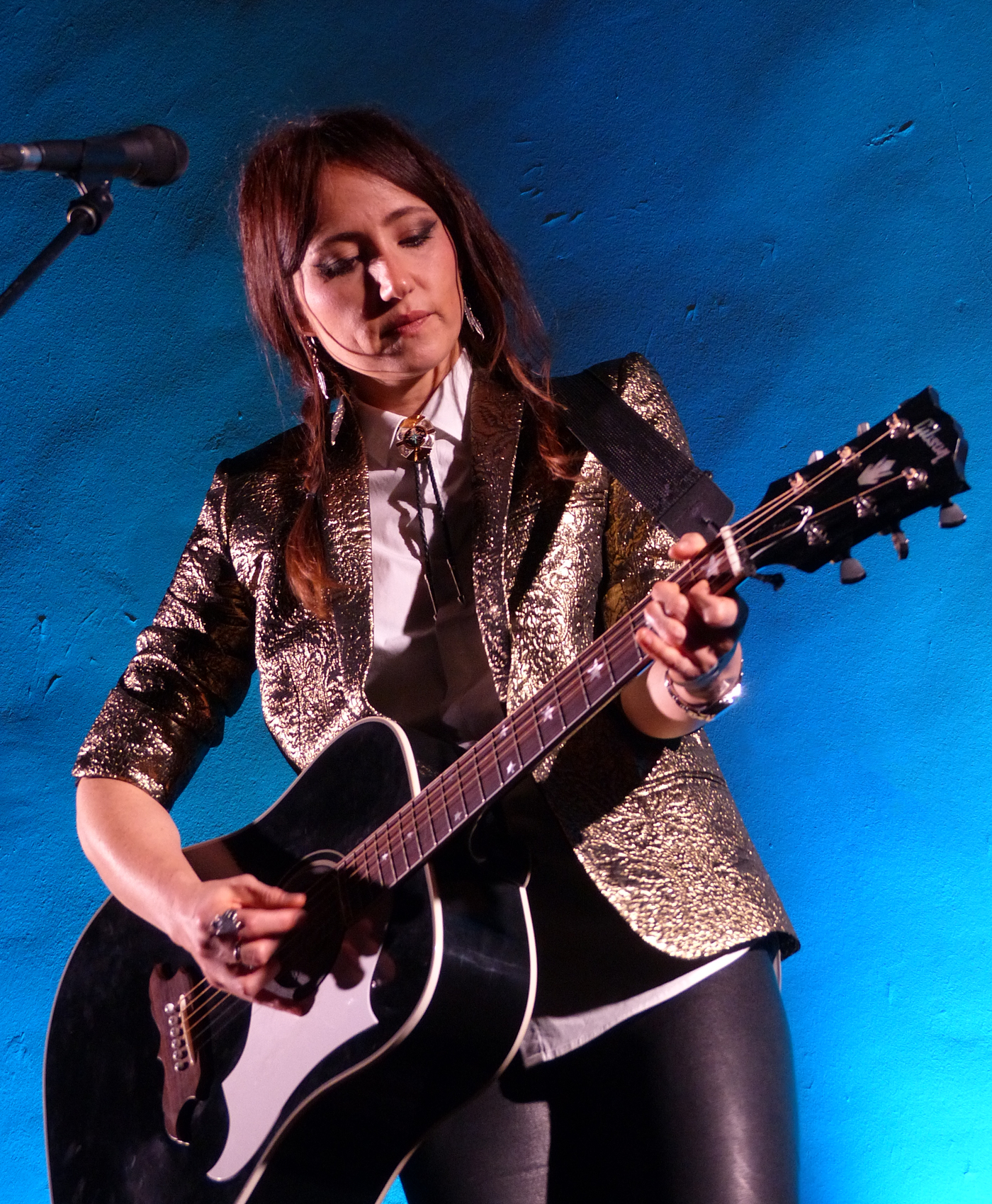
KT Tunstall won Best Song, Musically and Lyrically.

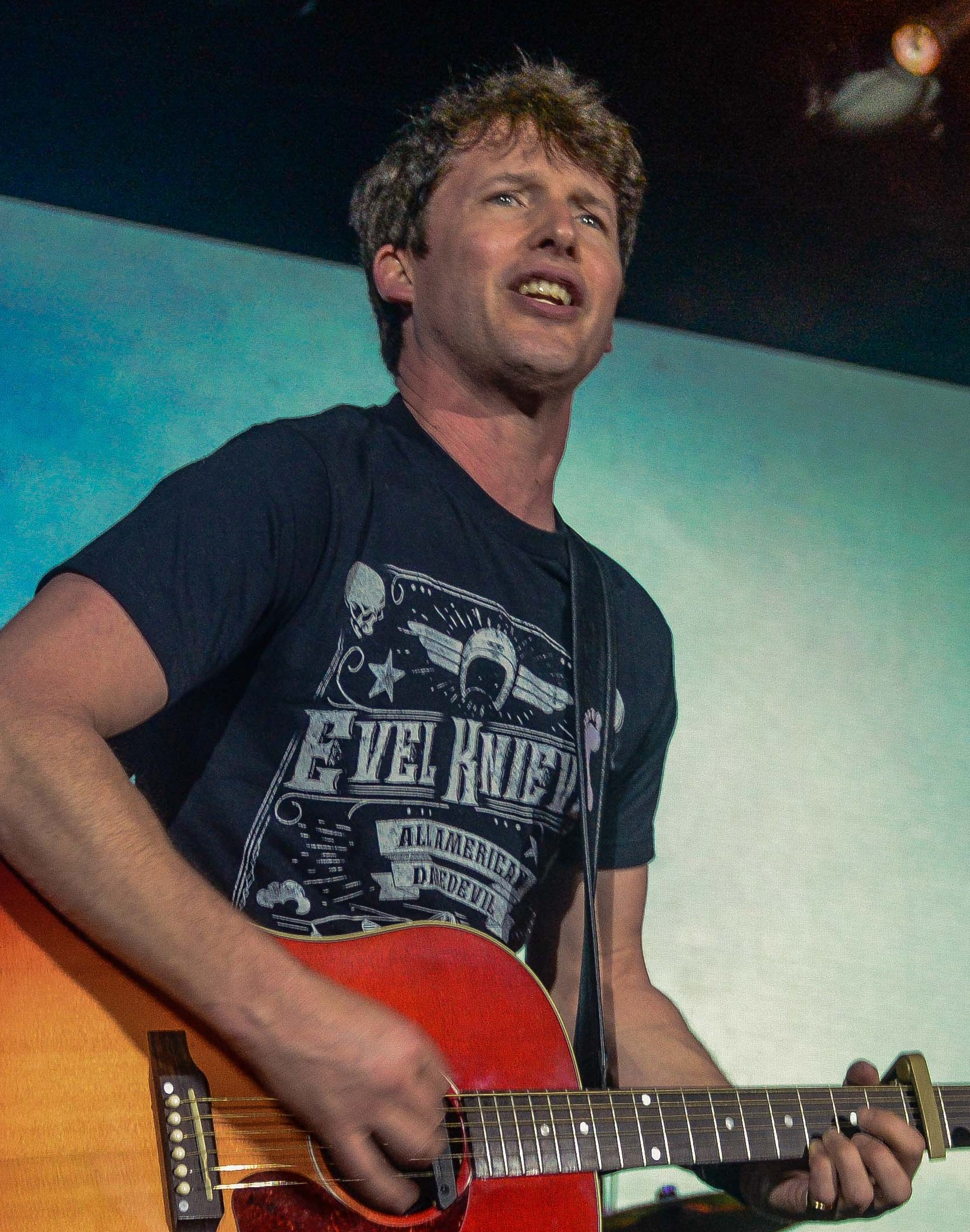
James Blunt received International Hit of the Year and Most Performed Work, both alonsgside Amanda Ghost and Sacha Skarbek.

The 51st Ivor Novello Awards were presented on May 25, 2006 at the Grosvenor House, London.

Category	Recipient and nominees
Album Award	**Employment – Written by Nick Baines, Nick Hodgson, Simon Rix, Andrew White and Ricky Wilson; Performed by Kaiser Chiefs**
Best Contemporary Song	**"Wires" – Written by Joel Pott, Steven Roberts, Timothy Wanstall and Carey Willetts; Performed by Athlete**; "DARE" – Written by Damon Albarn, Brian Burton and Jamie Hewlett; Performed by Gorillaz featuring Shaun Ryder; "I Predict a Riot" – Written by Nick Baines, Nick Hodgson, Simon Rix, Andrew White and Ricky Wilson; Performed by Kaiser Chiefs
Best Original Film Score	**Evil – Composed by Francis Shaw**; The Chronicles of Narnia: The Lion, the Witch and the Wardrobe – Composed by Harry Gregson-Williams; Pride & Prejudice – Composed by Dario Marianelli
Best Selling UK Single	**"That's My Goal" – Written by Jörgen Elofsson, Jeremy Godfrey and Bill Padley; Performed by Shayne Ward**
Best Song, Musically and Lyrically	**"Suddenly I See" – Written and performed by KT Tunstall**; "Fix You" – Written by Guy Berryman, Jonathan Buckland, Will Champion and Chris Martin; Performed by Coldplay; "I Bet You Look Good on the Dancefloor" – Written by Alex Turner; Performed by Arctic Monkeys
Best Television Soundtrack	**Elizabeth I – Composed by Rob Lane**; A Waste of Shame: The Mystery of Shakespeare and His Sonnets – Composed by Kevin Sargen (composer); Colditz – Composed by Richard Harvey
International Achievement	**Ian Anderson**
International Hit of the Year	**"You're Beautiful" – Written by James Blunt, Amanda Ghost and Sacha Skarbek; Performed by James Blunt**; "Speed of Sound" – Written by Guy Berryman, Jonathan Buckland, Will Champion and Chris Martin; Performed by Coldplay; "Tripping" – Written by Stephen Duffy and Robbie Williams; Performed by Robbie Williams
Outstanding Song Collection	**New Order (Philip Cunningham, Gillian Gilbert, Peter Hook, Stephen Morris and Bernard Sumner**
PRS Most Performed Work	**"You're Beautiful" – Written by James Blunt, Amanda Ghost and Sacha Skarbek; Performed by James Blunt**; "Sound of Sound" – Written by Guy Berryman, Jonathan Buckland, Will Champion and Chris Martin; Performed by Coldplay; "Shiver" – Written by Natalie Imbruglia, Sheppard Solomon and Francis Eg White; Performed by Natalie Imbruglia
PRS Outstanding Contribution to British Music	**Ray Davies**
Songwriters of the Year	**Damon Albarn and Jamie Hewlett**
The Ivors Classical Music Award	**Harrison Birtwistle**
The Special International Award	**Kenny Gamble and Leon Huff**

=== 2007 ===
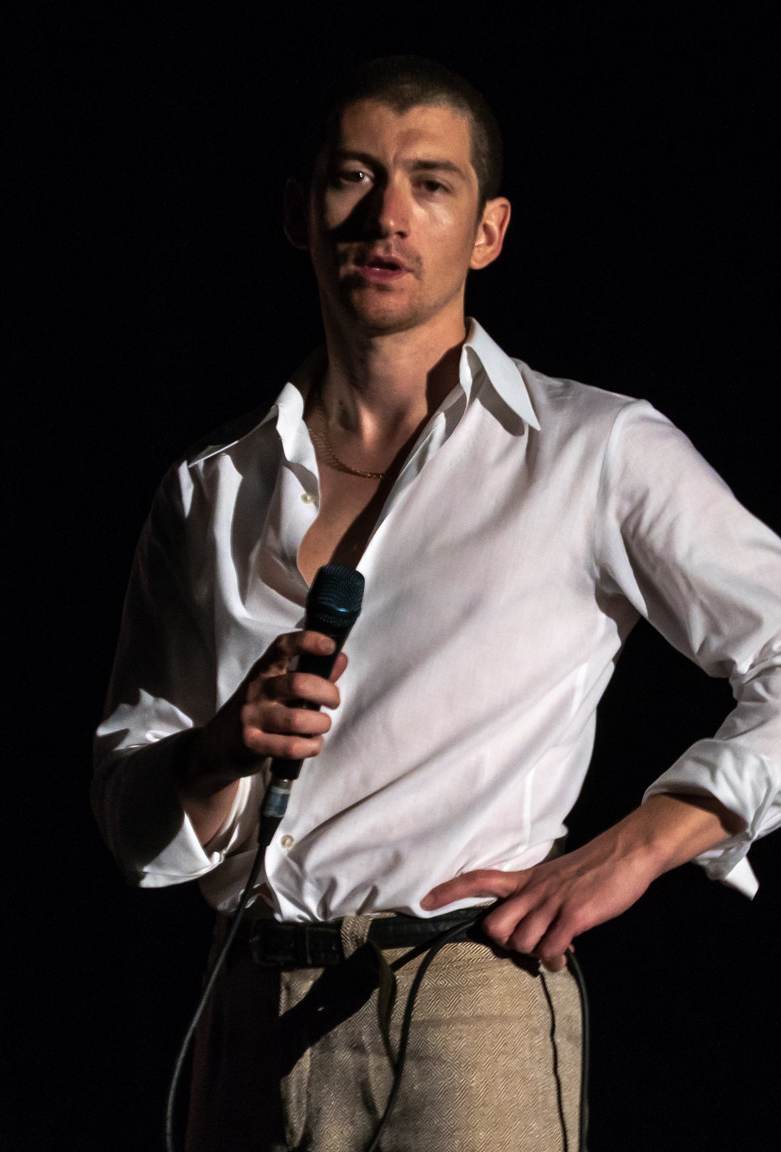
Alex Turner from Arctic Monkeys received the Album Award.

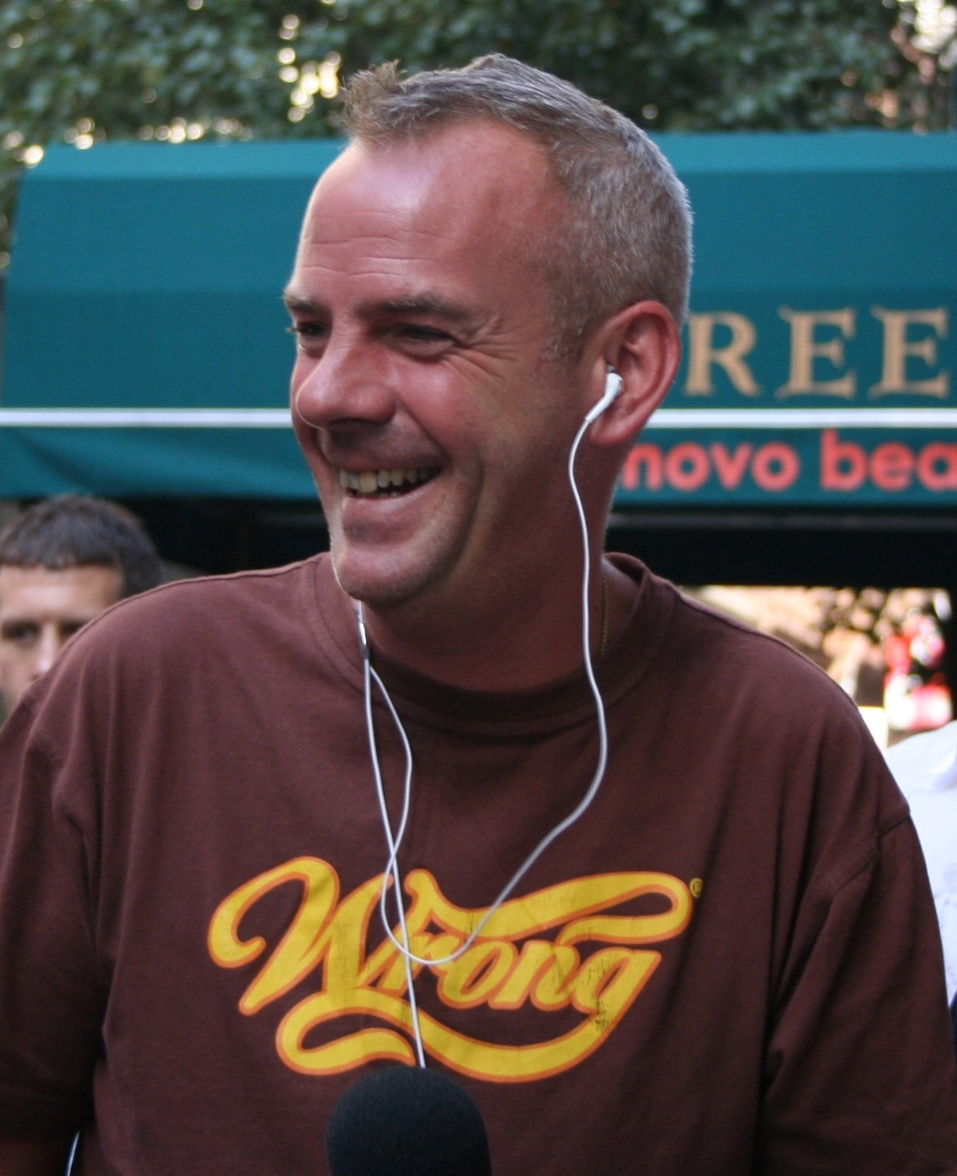
Norman Cook (Fatboy Slim) received the Outstanding Contribution to British Music award.

The 52nd Ivor Novello Awards were presented on May 24, 2007 at the Grosvenor House, London.

Category	Recipient and nominees
Album Award	**Whatever People Say I Am, That's What I'm Not – Written by Alex Turner; Performed by Arctic Monkeys**
Best Contemporary Song	**"Rehab" – Written and performed by Amy Winehouse**; "Over and Over" – Written by Joseph Goddard, Alexis Taylor and Felix Martin; Performed by Hot Chip; "Yeah Yeah" – Written by Nick Bridges, Jon Pearn, Nathan Thomas, Luciana Caporaso and Nick Clow; Performed by Bodyrox
Best Original Film Score	**Ice Age: The Meltdown – Composed by John Powell**; Casino Royale – Composed by David Arnold; Severance – Composed by Christian Henson
Best Selling UK Single	**"A Moment Like This" – Written by Jörgen Elofsson and John Reid; Performed by Leona Lewis**
Best Song Musically and Lyrically	**"Elusive" – Written and performed by Scott Matthews**; "Sophia" – Written and performed by Nerina Pallot; "When the Sun Goes Down" – Written by Alex Turner; Performed by Arctic Monkeys
Best Television Soundtrack	**The Virgin Queen – Composed by Martin Phipps**; Hotel Babylon – Composed by Jim Williams and John Lunn; Shiny Shiny Bright New Hole in My Heart – Composed by Alex Heffes
International Hit of the Year	**"Sorry" – Written by Madonna and Stuart Price; Performed by Madonna**; "I Don't Feel Like Dancin'" – Written by Elton John, Scott Hoffman and Jason Sellards; Performed by Scissor Sisters; "Rudebox" – Written by Robbie Williams, Danny Spencer, Kelvin Andrews, Sly Dunbar, Robbie Shakespeare, William "Earl2 Collins, Bill Laswell and Edmund "Carl Jr" Aiken; Performed by Robbie Williams
Lifetime Achievement	**Peter Gabriel**
Outstanding Song Colecction	**Yusuf Islam**
PRS Most Performed Work	**"I Don't Feel Like Dancin'" – Written by Elton John, Scott Hoffman and Jason Sellards; Performed by Scissor Sisters**; "Sorry" – Written by Madonna and Stuart Price; Performed by Madonna; "Put Your Records On" – Written by Corinne Bailey Rae, John Beck and Steve Chrisanthou; Performed by Corinne Bailey Rae
PRS Outstanding Contribution to British Music	**Norman Cook**
Songwriters of the Year	**Dan Gillespie Sells, Ciaran Jeremiah, Kevin Jeremiah, Richard Jones and Paul Stewart**
The Ivors Classical Music Award	**John Rutter**
The Special International Award	**Quincy Jones**

=== 2008 ===
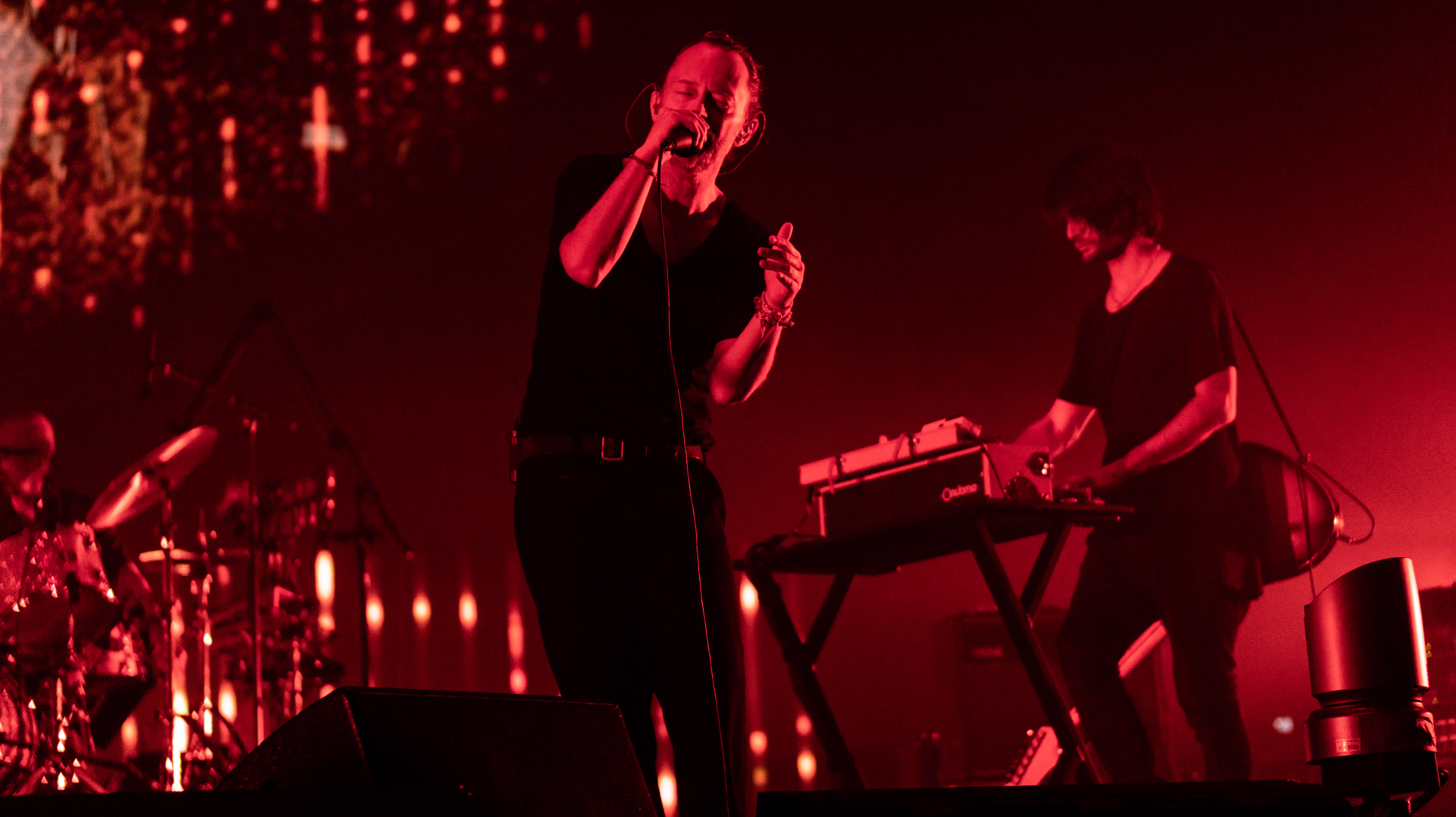
English band Radiohead received the Album Award.

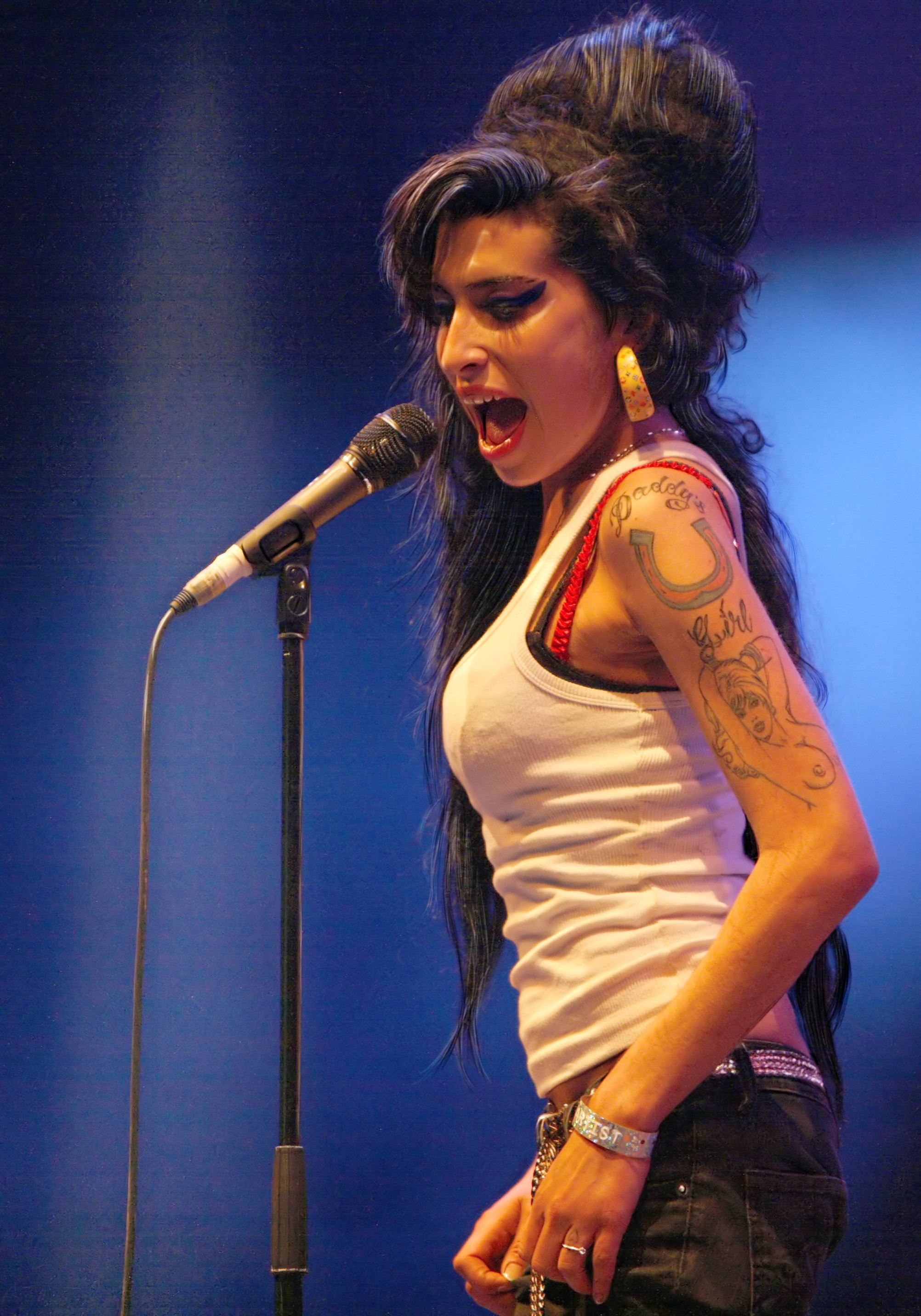
Amy Winehouse won Best Song Musically and Lyrically.

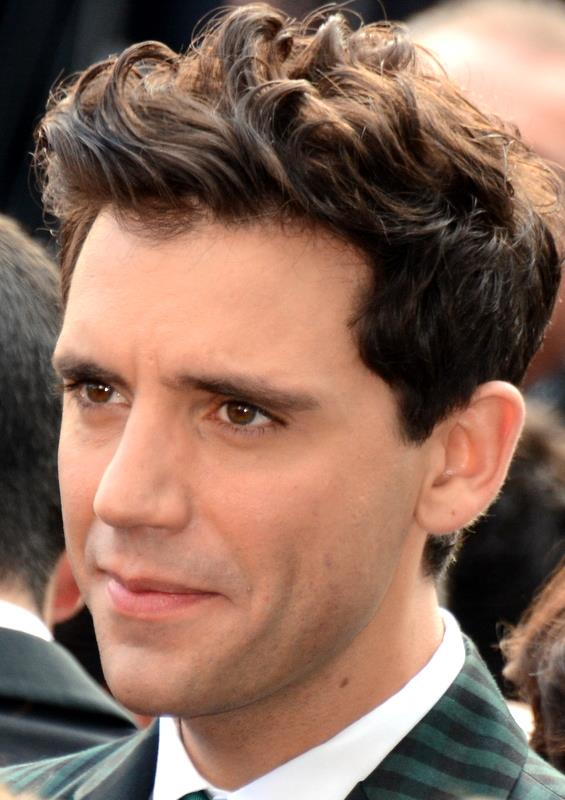
Mika won the Songwriter of the Year award.

The 53rd Ivor Novello Awards were presented on May 22, 2008 at the Grosvenor House, London.

Category	Recipient and nominees
Album Award	**In Rainbows – Written by Colin Greenwood, Jonny Greenwood, Ed O'Brien, Philip Selway and Thom Yorke; Performed by Radiohead**; Man on the Roof – Written and performed by Stephen Fretwell; Thirst for Romance – Written by Simon Aldred; Performed by Cherry Ghost
Best Contemporary Song	**"People Help the People" – Written by Simon Aldred; Performed by Cherry Ghost**; "Foundations" – Written by Paul Epworth and Kate Nash; Performed by Kate Nash; "Golden Skans" – Written by Jamie Reynolds, James Righton and Simon Taylor-Davies; Performed by Klaxons
Best Original Film Score	**Atonement – Composed by Dario Marianelli**; Becoming Jane – Composed by Adrian Johnston; La Vie en Rose – Composed by Christopher Gunning
Best Song Musically and Lyrically	**"Love Is a Losing Game" – Written and performed by Amy Winehouse**; "Let Me Out" – Written by Rosi Golan and Jamie Hartman; Performed by Ben's Brother; "You Know I'm No Good" – Written and performed by Amy Winehouse
Best Selling British Song	**"Beautiful Liar" – Written by Ian Dench, Mikkel Eriksen, Amanda Ghost, Tor Erik Hermansen and Beyoncé Knowles; Performed by Beyoncé and Shakira**; "Grace Kelly" – Written by Jodi Marr, John Merchant, Mika and Dan Warner; Performed by Mika; "Rehab" – Written and performed by Amy Winehouse
Best Television Soundtrack	**Oliver Twist – Composed by Martin Phipps**; Primo – Composed by Jonathan Goldstein; Who Killed Mrs De Ropp? – Composed by Paul Moessl
International Achievement	**Phil Collins**
Lifetime Achievement	**David Gilmour**
Outstanding Song Collection	**Gabrielle**
PRS Outstanding Contribution to British Music	**Chris Difford and Glenn Tilbrook**
PRS Most Performed Work	**"Shine" – Written by Gary Barlow, Howard Donald, Jason Orange, Mark Owen and Stephen Robson; Performed by Take That**; "Ruby" – Written by Nicholas Baines, Nick Hodgson, James Rix, Andrew White and Ricky Wilson; Performed by Kaiser Chiefs; "Starz in Their Eyes" – Written by Jack Allsopp; Performed by Just Jack
Songwriter of the Year	**Mika**
The Ivors Classical Music Award	**Jonathan Dove**
The Ivors Inspiration Award	**Jazzie B**
The Special International Award	**Diane Warren**

=== 2009 ===
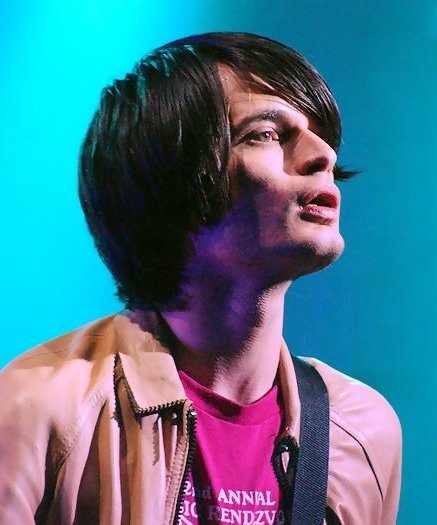
Jonny Greenwood won Best Original Film Score.

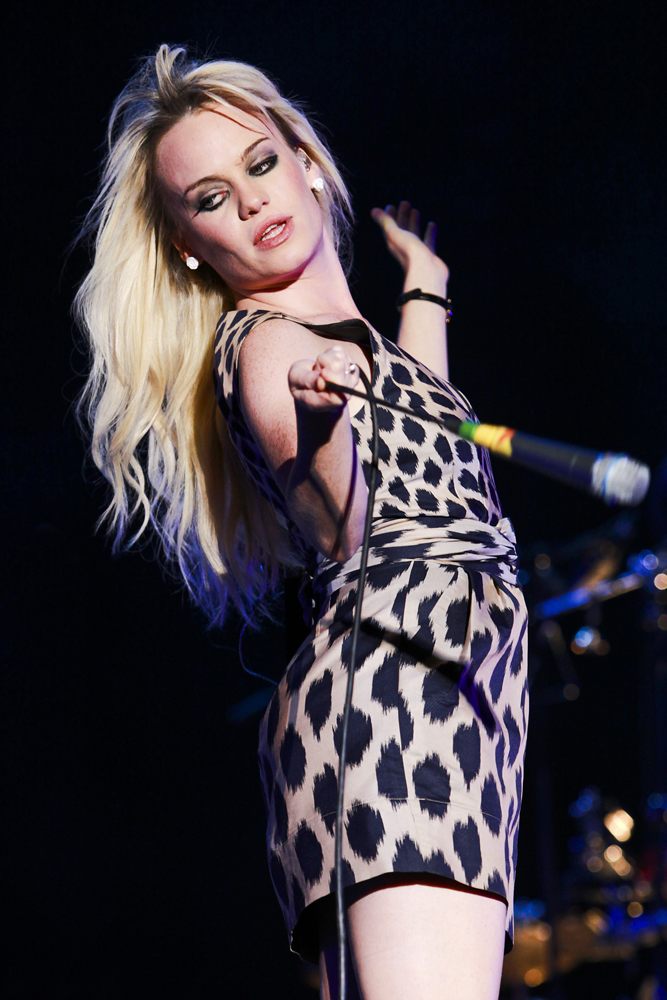
Duffy won Most Performed Work alongside Steve Booker.

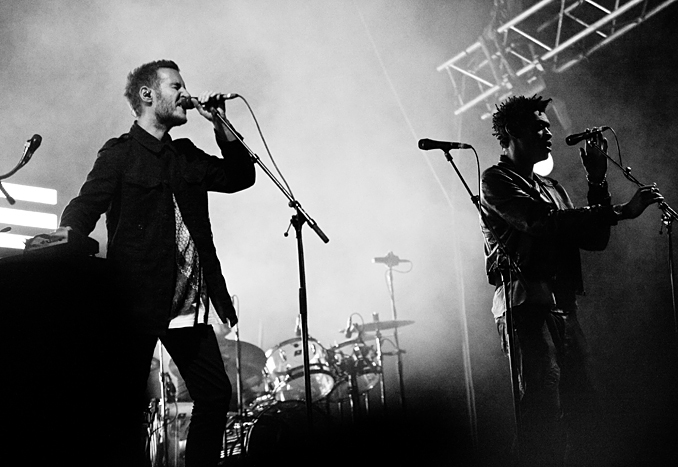
English collective Massive Attack received the Outstanding Contribution to British Music award.

The 54th Ivor Novello Awards were held at the Grosvenor House, Park Lane, London on May 21, 2009.

Category	Recipient and nominees
Album Award	**We Started Nothing – Written by Julian De Martino and Katie White; Performed by The Ting Tings**; Rockferry – Written by Bernard Butler and Duffy; Performed by Duffy; Viva la Vida or Death and All His Friends – Written by Guy Berryman, Jonny Buckland, Will Champion and Chris Martin; Performed by Coldplay
Best Contemporary Song	**"Grounds for Divorce" – Written by Guy Garvey, Richard Jupp, Craig Potter, Mark Potter and Peter Turner; Performed by Elbow**; "Dance wiv Me" – Written by Nicholas Detnon, Calvin Harris, Dylan Mills and Tyrone; Performed by Dizzee Rascal featuring Calvin Harris and Chrom3; "That's Not My Name" – Written by Julian De Martino and Katie White; Performed by The Ting Tings
Best Original Film Score	**There Will Be Blood – Composed by Jonny Greenwood**; Quantum of Solace – Composed by David Arnold; The Escapist – Composed by Benjamin Wallfisch
Best Song Musically and Lyrically	**"One Day Like This" – Written by Guy Garvey, Richard Jupp, Craig Potter, Mark Potter and Peter Turner; Performed by Elbow**; "My Mistakes Were Made for You" – Written by Miles Kane and Alex Turner; Performed by The Last Shadow Puppets; "The Last of the Melting Snow" – Written by Nicholas Hemming; Performed by The Leisure Society
Best Selling British Single	**"Viva la Vida – Written by Guy Berryman, Jonny Buckland, Will Champion and Chris Martin; Performed by Coldplay**; "Mercy" – Written by Steve Booker and Duffy; Performed by Duffy; "Paper Planes" – Written by Maya Arulpragasam, Topper Headon, Mick Jones, Thomas Wesley Pentz, Paul Simonon and Joe Strummer; Performed by M.I.A.
Best Television Soundtrack	**Wallace and Gromit: A Matter of Loaf and Death – Composed by Julian Nott**; Fiona's Story – Composed by Ben Bartlett; Trial & Retribution – Composed by Anne Dudley
Outstanding Song Collection	**Vince Clarke**
PRS for Music Most Performed Work	**"Mercy" – Written by Steve Booker and Duffy; Performed by Duffy**; "Viva la Vida – Written by Guy Berryman, Jonny Buckland, Will Champion and Chris Martin; Performed by Coldplay; "Sweet About Me" – Written by Gabriella Cilmi, Nicholas Coler, Miranda Cooper, Brian Higgins, Timothy Larcombe and Tim Powell; Performed by Gabriella Cilmi
PRS for Music Outstanding Contribution to British Music	**Massive Attack (Robert Del Naja, Grant Marshall and Andrew Vowles)**
PRS for Music Special International Award	**Smokey Robinson**
Songwriters of the Year	**Eg White**
The Ivors Classical Music Award	**James MacMillan**
The Ivors Inspiration Award	**Edwyn Collins**
