= Jamelia discography =

British R&B Singer

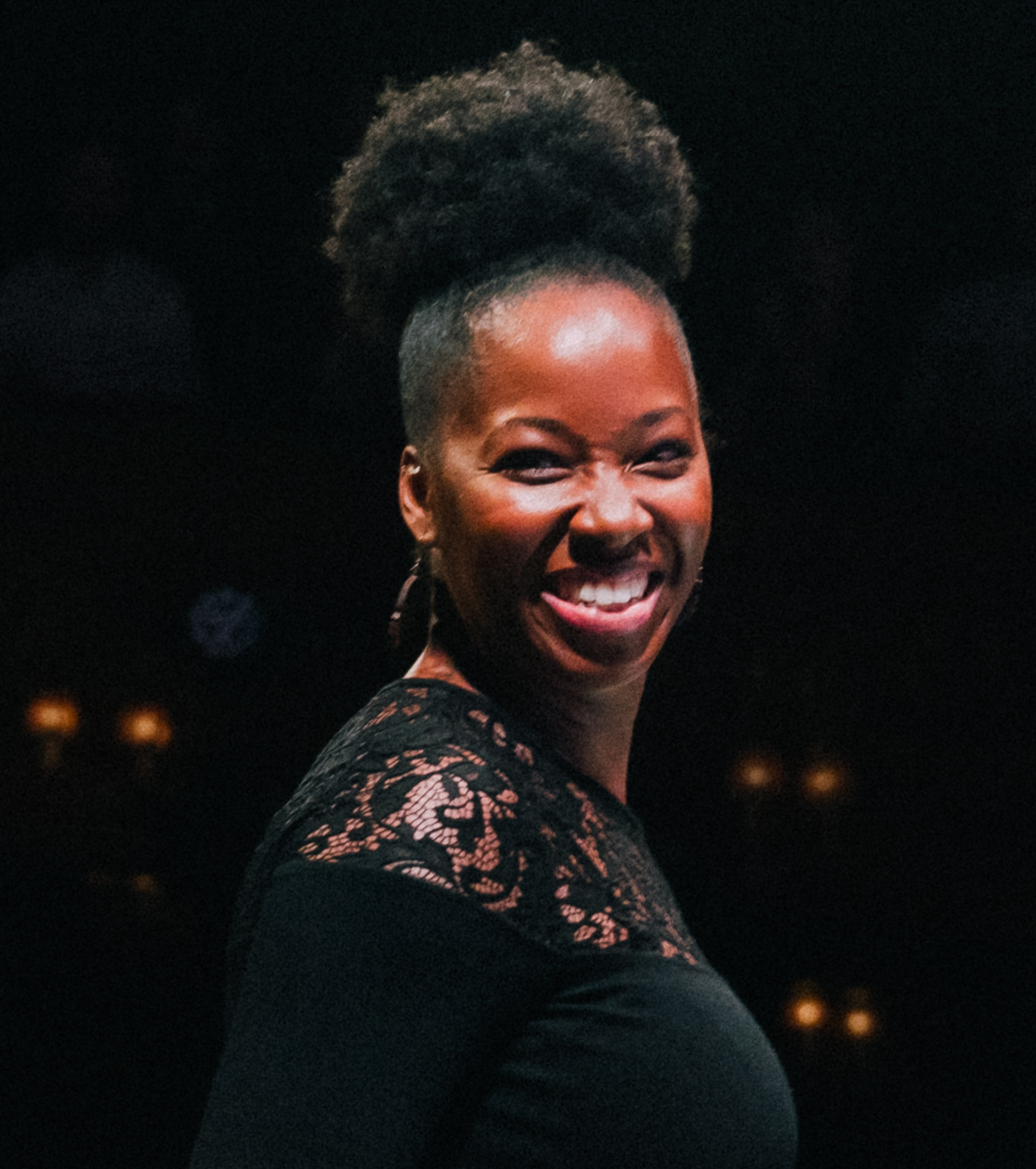
- Jamelia in 2019
- Studio albums: 3
- Compilation albums: 2
- Singles: 14
- Music videos: 15
- Other appearances: 5
- DVDs: 4

The discography of the British R&B recording artist Jamelia, consists of three studio albums, one greatest hits album, and fourteen singles, fifteen music videos, and one live DVD of a concert performance. She has contributed to the albums of two other artists, and appeared on two soundtrack albums. Jamelia signed with Capitol Records in 1996, and her debut single, "So High", was released on 3 May 1999. It failed to chart and she left the record company before an album was released. Later that year, Jamelia released "I Do" with Parlophone, which was followed up in 2000 with her first top five single, titled "Money", and her debut album Drama.

Jamelia's second album, Thank You, released in 2003, is her most successful to date, peaking at number 4 on the UK Albums Chart, at number 16 in New Zealand, and at number 21 in Ireland. It also charted in Australia and mainland Europe, but in much lower positions. The album's lead singles were "Bout", a reggae-style song that features a rap from Rah Digga, and pop/dance song "Superstar". "Bout" charted at 37 on the UK Singles Chart, but "Superstar" fared much better, entering the singles chart at number 8 and climbing to number 3, its peak position, after four weeks. It was also the 26th best selling single of 2003. The next single taken from Thank You was the title track, which peaked at number 2 in the UK. Both "Superstar" and "Thank You" are Jamelia's most successful single releases to date, appearing in many singles charts worldwide. Thank You was subsequently re-released with two new songs: "See It in a Boy's Eyes" and "DJ".

In 2004, Jamelia performed "Universal Prayer" with Tiziano Ferro for release on his album 111 Centoundici. The song also appears on Unity, the soundtrack for the 2004 Summer Olympics. The song was released as a single in mainland Europe, and reached number 1 in Italy. Later that year, she recorded "Stop", a cover of the 1988 song recorded by Sam Brown. It is included on the soundtrack album to the feature film The Edge of Reason, and was released as a double A-side with "DJ". At the end of 2004, Jamelia recorded an updated version of the charity record "Do They Know It's Christmas?" as a part of Band Aid 20; it became the Christmas number one. Jamelia's third and most recent album, Walk with Me, was released in 2006. It was not as commercially popular as Thank You, reaching number 20 on the albums chart in the UK; the three singles that were released from the album also fared worse than the singles from Thank You. "Something About You" and "Beware of the Dog" peaked just inside the top 10; "No More" fell short of the top 40. Jamelia has had seven singles chart inside the UK Top 10, and only three chart outside the UK Top 40.

== Albums ==
=== Studio albums ===
| Title | Details | Peak chart positions | | | | | | | | | | Certifications |
| Title | Details | UK | AUS | AUT | BEL | FRA | GER | IRE | NL | NZ | SWI | Certifications |
|---|---|---|---|---|---|---|---|---|---|---|---|---|
| Drama | Released: 26 June 2000; Label: Parlophone, EMI; Formats: CD, cassette, vinyl | 39 | — | — | — | — | — | — | — | — | — | |
| Thank You | Released: 29 September 2003; Label: Parlophone, EMI; Formats: CD, digital download | 4 | 63 | 62 | 74 | 52 | 56 | 21 | 84 | 16 | 33 | UK: Platinum 600,000 sales (as of September 2007) |
| Walk with Me | Released: 25 September 2006; Label: Parlophone, EMI; Formats: CD, digital download | 20 | — | — | — | — | — | 67 | — | — | 74 | UK: Gold 107,000 sales (as of September 2007) |
"—" denotes an album that did not chart or was not released in that territory.

=== Compilation albums ===
| Title | Details | Peak chart positions |
| Title | Details | UK |
|---|---|---|
| Superstar – The Hits | Released: 24 September 2007; Label: Parlophone, EMI; Formats: CD, digital download | 55 |
| Jamelia – The Collection | Released: 27 July 2009; Label: EMI; Formats: CD, digital download | — |
"—" denotes an album that did not chart or was not released in that territory.

=== Video albums ===
| Title | Details |
|---|---|
| Thank You – Live | Released: 1 November 2004; Label: EMI; Format: DVD |

== Singles ==
=== As lead artist ===
| Year | Title | Peak chart positions | | | | | | | | | | Certifications | Album |
| Year | Title | UK | AUS | AUT | BEL | FRA | GER | IRE | NL | NZ | SWI | Certifications | Album |
|---|---|---|---|---|---|---|---|---|---|---|---|---|---|
| 1999 | "So High" | — | — | — | — | — | — | — | — | — | — | | Non-album single |
| 1999 | "I Do" | 36 | — | — | — | — | — | — | — | — | — | | Drama |
| 2000 | "Money" (featuring Beenie Man) | 5 | — | — | — | — | — | 18 | 51 | — | — | | Drama |
| 2000 | "Call Me" | 11 | — | — | — | — | — | — | — | — | — | | Drama |
| 2000 | "Boy Next Door" | 42 | — | — | — | — | — | — | — | — | — | | Drama |
| 2003 | "Bout" (featuring Rah Digga) | 37 | — | — | — | — | — | — | — | — | — | | Thank You |
| 2003 | "Superstar" | 3 | 1 | 3 | 6 | 3 | 4 | 19 | 5 | 1 | 2 | UK: Platinum; AUS: Platinum; BEL: Gold; FRA: Gold; GER: Gold; NZ: Platinum | Thank You |
| 2004 | "Thank You" | 2 | 7 | 43 | 37 | 30 | 46 | 10 | 28 | 8 | 35 | UK: Silver; AUS: Gold | Thank You |
| 2004 | "See It in a Boy's Eyes" | 5 | 35 | — | 36 | — | — | 11 | — | — | — | | Thank You |
| 2004 | "DJ" / "Stop" | 9 | 37 | — | 46 | 26 | 56 | 12 | — | — | 36 | | Thank You |
| 2006 | "Something About You" | 9 | 17 | 43 | 26 | — | 59 | 28 | 73 | — | 46 | | Walk with Me |
| 2006 | "Beware of the Dog" | 10 | 50 | 68 | 52 | — | 63 | 48 | 91 | 29 | — | | Walk with Me |
| 2007 | "No More" | 43 | — | — | 55 | — | — | — | — | — | — | | Walk with Me |
"—" denotes a single that did not chart or was not released in that territory.

=== As featured artist ===
| Year | Title | Peak chart positions | | | | | | | | | | Album |
| Year | Title | UK | AUS | AUT | BEL | FRA | GER | IRE | NL | NZ | SWI | Album |
|---|---|---|---|---|---|---|---|---|---|---|---|---|
| 2004 | "Universal Prayer" (with Tiziano Ferro) | — | — | 46 | 52 | 61 | 52 | — | 69 | — | 31 | 111 Centoundici; Unity |
| 2004 | "Do They Know It's Christmas?" (as part of Band Aid 20) | 1 | 9 | 15 | 3 | 72 | 7 | 1 | 3 | 1 | 7 | Non-album single |
"—" denotes a single that did not chart or was not released in that territory.

== Other appearances ==
These songs did not originally appear on an official release by Jamelia.

=== Guest appearances ===
| Year | Title | Album | Artist |
|---|---|---|---|
| 2003 | "Universal Prayer" | 111 Centoundici | Tiziano Ferro |
| 2004 | "Straight Ahead" | The Hits: Reloaded (International version) | Kool & the Gang |
| 2009 | "We Can Do Anything" | Catch Me If You Can | Bashy and Loick Essien |

=== Compilation appearances ===
| Year | Title | Album | Notes |
|---|---|---|---|
| 2006 | "Numb" | Radio 1's Live Lounge | Live acoustic performance of song originally recorded by Linkin Park. |

=== Soundtrack appearances ===
| Year | Title | Album | Notes |
|---|---|---|---|
| 2004 | "Universal Prayer" | Unity | Soundtrack to the 2004 Summer Olympics |
| 2004 | "Stop" | Bridget Jones: The Edge of Reason | Soundtrack to the film Bridget Jones: The Edge of Reason |

== Music videos ==
| Year | Title | Director(s) |
|---|---|---|
| 1999 | "I Do" | Sven Harding |
| 2000 | "Money" | Max and Dania |
| 2000 | "Call Me" | Jake Nava |
| 2000 | "Boy Next Door" | Sophie Muller |
| 2003 | "Bout" | Barnaby Roper |
| 2003 | "Superstar" | Dominic Leung |
| 2004 | "Thank You" | Matthew Rolston |
| 2004 | "Thank You" (featuring Singuila) | Skwall |
| 2004 | "Thank You" (Studio) | |
| 2004 | "See It in a Boy's Eyes" | W.I.Z. |
| 2004 | "Universal Prayer" (with Tiziano Ferro) | |
| 2004 | "DJ" | Alex Hemming & Quinn Williams |
| 2004 | "Stop" | Alex Hemming |
| 2004 | "Do They Know It's Christmas?" (as part of Band Aid 20) | Geoff Wonfor |
| 2006 | "Something About You" | Stuart Orme |
| 2006 | "Beware of the Dog" | Ray Kay |
| 2007 | "No More" | Paul Gore |
