= Superstar – The Hits =

Superstar - The Hits

Greatest hits album by Jamelia
- Released: 24 September 2007
- Recorded: 1997–2006
- Length: 39:00
- Label: Parlophone
- Producers: Joe Belmaati; Peter Biker; Stuart Crichton; Cutfather; Colin Emmanuel; Jimmy Hogarth; Matt Kent; Cameron McVey; Soulshock & Karlin

Jamelia chronology
| Walk with Me (2006) | Superstar - The Hits (2007) | Jamelia - The Collection (2009) |

Superstar – The Hits is the first greatest hits album by English singer-songwriter Jamelia. It released by Parlophone Records on 24 September 2007.

== Background ==
Jamelia said of the collection: "It seems the right time to put out a Greatest Hits and have all the best tracks I've recorded from the past ten years on one album". Superstar – The Hits contains ten out of eleven of Jamelia's UK Top 40 singles to date and omits her debut single, "So High", her first top forty hit "I Do", Drama single "Boy Next Door" and her collaboration with Tiziano Ferro, "Universal Prayer", which remains unreleased in the UK.

== Critical reception ==
Professional ratings
Review scores
| Source | Rating |
|---|---|
| AllMusic | 3/5 stars |
| Digital Spy | 3.5/5 stars |

Nick Levine from Digital Spy called the album a "hastily-assembled singles collection plagued by the unmistakable whiff of Woolies' bargain bin: Superstar – The Hits features no new songs, no new photos and no liner essay praising its auteur's inestimable contribution to planet pop." AllMusic editor Sharon Mawer rated the album three and a half out of five stars and wrote: "With less than 40 minutes of music on the CD, there was plenty of room for either a little experimentation with some new tracks, or a little more adventure than simply compiling all the singles onto one album, the best of which had been on a big seller not long before."

== Commercial performance ==
Superstar – The Hits debuted at number 55 on the UK Albums Chart, becoming Jamelia's lowest charting album yet

== Track listing ==
Superstar – The Hits track listing
| No. | Title | Writer(s) | Producer(s) | Length |
|---|---|---|---|---|
| 1. | "Superstar" | Remee; Joe Belmaati; Mich Hansen | Cutfather & Joe | 3:35 |
| 2. | "Thank You" | Jamelia Davis; Carsten Schack; Peter Biker | Soulshock | 3:13 |
| 3. | "See It in a Boy's Eyes" | Davis; Chris Martin | Matt Kent; Cameron McVey | 3:41 |
| 4. | "Stop" | Sam Brown; Gregg Sutton; Bruce Brody | Jimmy Hogarth | 3:39 |
| 5. | "Money" (featuring Beenie Man) | Colin Emmanuel; Daniel de Bourg; Davis; James Yarde; Moses Davis | Emmanuel | 6:20 |
| 6. | "Beware of the Dog" | Davis; Stuart Crichton; Tommy Lee James; Karen Poole; Martin Gore | Crichton | 3:09 |
| 7. | "DJ" | Schack; Kenneth Karlin; Philip White; Alex Cantrall; Olivia Longott | Soulshock & Karlin | 3:45 |
| 8. | "Something About You" | Davis; Schack; Biker | Soulshock; Biker | 3:25 |
| 9. | "Call Me" | Davis | Emmanuel | 4:20 |
| 10. | "Bout" (featuring Rah Digga) | Davis; Emmanuel | Emmanuel | 4:26 |
| 11. | "No More" | Davis; Crichton; James; The Stranglers | Crichton | 2:54 |
| Total length: | | | | 39:00 |

Sample credits

- "Beware of the Dog" contains a sample of "Personal Jesus" by Depeche Mode.
- "Bout" samples "Gonna Fly Now" as performed by Bill Conti.
- "No More" contains a sample of "Golden Brown" by The Stranglers.

== Charts ==
Weekly chart performance for Superstar – The Hits
| Chart (2007) | Peak position |
|---|---|
| Scottish Albums (Official Charts) | 68 |
| UK Albums (Official Charts) | 55 |
| UK R&B Albums (Official Charts) | 18 |
