= Jamelia – The Collection =

Compilation album by Jamelia
- Released: 27 July 2009
- Genre: R&B
- Length: 51:02
- Label: EMI Gold
- Producer: Soulshock & Karlin, Stuart Crichton, Cutfather & Joe, Colin Emmanuel (aka C-Swing)

Jamelia chronology
Superstar - The Hits (2007)	Jamelia – The Collection (2009)

Professional ratings
Review scores
Source	Rating
Digital Spy	3/5 stars

Jamelia – The Collection is the second greatest hits album by English singer-songwriter Jamelia. The album was released on 27 July 2009 on EMI and Emi Gold Records.

== Track listing ==
No.	Title	Length
1.	"Superstar"	3:35
2.	"Thank You"	3:15
3.	"Stop"	3:39
4.	"Ghetto"	4:33
5.	"Life"	4:46
6.	"Call Me"	3:35
7.	"I Do"	5:31
8.	"No More"	2:53
9.	"Know My Name"	3:27
10.	"Same-ish"	3:16
11.	"Money (Emmanuel Remix)"	4:30
12.	"Boy Next Door (Stush Remix)"	3:53
13.	"Call Me (Jonuz Deep Cover Mix)"	4:07
Total length:		51:02
