= Thank You (Jamelia album) =

Studio album by Jamelia
- Released: 29 September 2003
- Genre: R&B
- Length: 46:06 (Version 1); 53:59 (Versions 2 and 3)
- Label: Parlophone
- Producer: Cutfather & Joe; Soulshock; Cameron McVey; Matt Kent; Jimmy Hogarth; Ignorants; Copenhaniacs; Colin Emmanuel; Marc "M2E" Smith; Sylvia Bennett Smith

Jamelia chronology
Drama (2000)	Thank You (2003)	Walk with Me (2006)

Alternative cover
- Re-release cover

Singles from Thank You
- 1. "Bout" Released: 16 June 2003; 2. "Superstar" Released: 15 September 2003; 3. "Thank You" Released: 24 February 2004; 4. "See It in a Boy's Eyes" Released: 12 July 2004; 5. "Universal Prayer" Released: 2 August 2004; 6. "DJ" Released: 1 November 2004

Thank You is the second studio album by British singer Jamelia. It was released in the United Kingdom through Parlophone on 29 September 2003. Recording sessions took place from mid-2002 to early 2003, during a period of hiatus marked by the birth of her daughter and a series of private, tabloid-reported personal difficulties. The album features production primarily handled by Colin Emmanuel, alongside contributions from Cutfather, Soulshock, Peter Biker, Matt Kent and Cameron McVey, among others. Jamelia wrote 10 songs on Thank You, including the title track.

The album received generally positive reviews, with critics praising its confident, imaginative production and strong urban pop sound, while noting both its stylistic ambition and occasional reliance on more generic material. Commercially, Thank You had a slow initial UK release, debuting at number 66 before a 2004 re-release boosted it to number four and a Platinum certification from the British Phonographic Industry (BPI). It spent 53 weeks in the UK Top 100 and achieved moderate international success across Europe and Oceania, marking Jamelia's debut in several markets.

Thank You spawned seven singles with varied success, including lead single "Bout," Jamelia’s breakthrough hit "Superstar," which topped the charts in Australia and New Zealand, and "Thank You," which reached number two in the UK. Later re-release singles such as "See It in a Boy's Eyes," "Universal Prayer" and the double A-side "DJ"/"Stop" continued its success, yielding multiple UK top-ten entries. In further promotion, Jamelia embarked on her first headlining tour, the Thank You Tour, in 2004. The same year, the album was shortlisted for the Mercury Prize.

== Background ==
Thank You was developed following a hiatus in Jamelia's recording career, during which she gave birth to her daughter from a relationship with music manager Terry Wallen and experienced increased personal and media scrutiny. Rather than proceeding directly with new material, she paused active promotion and recording before resuming work in mid-2002 under Parlophone’s continued support. At the time, Jamelia was reconsidering her artistic direction. Although she had been marketed primarily as an R&B artist, she has stated that she was open to a broader range of musical styles.

Recording for the album took place between mid-2002 and early 2003, with Jamelia collaborating with a range of producers, most prominently Colin Emmanuel, who handled the majority of the album’s production, alongside Cutfather, Soulshock, Peter Biker, Matt Kent, and Cameron McVey, among others. The project marked a stylistic continuation of her earlier R&B work while incorporating a stronger emphasis on pop-oriented production. Initial sessions yielded the single "Bout," while subsequent recordings, including "Superstar," established the commercial direction that would define the album's final form. Jamelia wrote 10 of the 14 tracks, with the title track drawing on her personal experiences of an unhealthy relationship.

== Singles ==
Thank You produced seven singles, all of which attained varying degrees of international chart success. "Bout" was released as the album's lead single in June 2003. It featured guest vocals from American rapper Rah Digga and reached the top forty in the UK. The follow-up single, "Superstar" became Jamelia's most successful single internationally to date, topping the charts in Australia and New Zealand. The title track was released as the album's third single in February 2004 and became Jamelia's highest-charting single in the UK to date, peaking at number 2 on the UK Singles Chart.

Following the single's success, the album was re-released with two additional tracks (three including Jamelia's duet with Italian singer Tiziano Ferro on the single, "Universal Prayer", which was only included on international versions of the re-release). "See It in a Boy's Eyes" served as the first single from the re-release and as the album's fourth single overall. It was most successful in the United Kingdom, where it became Jamelia's third consecutive top five hit. "Universal Prayer", a duet with Italian singer Tiziano Ferro, served as the album's fifth single and became Jamelia's first number-one hit in Italy and Spain. The album's final two singles, "DJ" and "Stop!" were released jointly as a double a-side single and became Jamelia's fourth consecutive top ten hit in the United Kingdom.

== Critical reception ==
Professional ratings
Review scores
Source	Rating
Allmusic	4/5 stars
laut.de	3/5 stars

Allmusic editor Jon O'Brien found that the album, "unlike countless other UK R&B albums, never forgets its roots, either [...] Overall, Thank You is a confident, imaginative record that oozes with personality and should be a lesson to record companies everywhere that patience can sometimes reap the biggest rewards." BBC critic Jaime Gill felt that Thank You "sees the vocalist take bold steps onto new musical ground. Indeed, Thank You is at its weakest when it is most generic [...] Given the success she is now enjoying, it seems likely that Jamelia's confidence and willingness to experiment can only grow. Her third album should be quite something." Entertainment.ie called Thank You a "genuinely classy collection of urban pop tracks" with "twitchy grooves and ear-grabbing hooks." The website further noted her emergence as "tough, smart and more than ready to embrace superstardom."

== Chart performance ==
In the United Kingdom, Thank You was initially released to lackluster sales, entering the UK Albums Chart at number 66 for the week of 11 October 2003 and spending just four weeks on the chart before dropping out. Following its re-release in March 2004, the album climbed to a new peak of number four, becoming Jamelia’s highest-charting album to date. It ultimately remained in the UK Top 100 for 53 weeks, continuing to chart intermittently until 2006, and was certified Platinum by the British Phonographic Industry (BPI) on 5 August 2004, denoting sales in excess of 300,000 copies.

Internationally, Thank You marked Jamelia's debut and attained moderate chart positions across Europe and Oceania, including France (52), Germany (56), Switzerland (33), Austria (62), Belgium's Flemish region (74), and the Netherlands (84), alongside a peak of 63 in Australia and 10 on the Australian Urban Albums chart.

== Track listing ==
Thank You – Standard version
No.	Title	Writer(s)	Producer(s)	Length
1.	"Bout" (featuring Rah Digga)	Jamelia Davis; Colin Emmanuel	Emmanuel	4:26
2.	"Off Da Endz" (featuring Asher D)	Davis; Emmanuel	Emmanuel	3:21
3.	"Taxi"	Karen Poole; Jimmy Hogarth	Hogarth	3:26
4.	"Thank You"	Davis; Carsten Schack; Peter Biker	Soulshock	3:13
5.	"Dirty Dirty"	Davis; Trevor Henry	Ignorants	4:22
6.	"B.I.T.C.H."	Davis; Jens Lomholt	Copenhaniacs	4:07
7.	"Superstar"	Remee; Joe Belmaati; Mich Hansen	Cutfather & Joe	3:35
8.	"Life"	Davis; Jamelia; Emmanuel	Emmanuel	4:45
9.	"Club Hoppin"	Davis; Ali Tennant; Lomholt; Philip Denker	Copenhaniacs	3:40
10.	"Antidote"	Davis; Emmanuel	Emmanuel	3:32
11.	"Cutie"	Davis; Emmanuel	Emmanuel	3:52
12.	"Bounce"	Marc Smith; Sylvia Bennett Smith; Dane Bowers	Smith; Bennett Smith	4:15

Re-release
No.	Title	Writer(s)	Producer(s)	Length
1.	"Superstar"	Remee; Belmaati; Mich Hansen	Cutfather & Joe	3:35
2.	"Thank You"	Davis; Schack; Biker	Schack	3:13
3.	"DJ"	Schack; Kenneth Karlin; Philip White; Alex Cantrall; Olivia Longott	Soulshock & Karlin	3:45
4.	"See It in a Boy's Eyes"	Davis; Chris Martin	Matt Kent; Cameron McVey	3:41
5.	"Taxi"	Poole; Hogarth	Hogarth	3:26
6.	"Dirty Dirty"	Davis; Henry	Ignorants	4:22
7.	"Club Hoppin"	Davis; Tennant; Lomholt; Denker	Copenhaniacs	3:40
8.	"Cutie"	Davis; Emmanuel	Emmanuel	3:52
9.	"Bounce"	Smith; Bennett Smith; Bowers	Davis; Smith; Bennett Smith	4:15
10.	"Bout" (featuring Rah Digga)	Davis; Emmanuel	Emmanuel	4:26
11.	"Off Da Endz" (featuring Asher D)	Jamelia; Emmanuel	Emmanuel	3:21
12.	"B.I.T.C.H."	Davis; Lomholt	Copenhaniacs	4:07
13.	"Life"	Davis; Emmanuel	Emmanuel	4:45
14.	"Antidote"	Davis; Emmanuel	Emmanuel	3:32

French edition alternate track / additional track
No.	Title	Writer(s)	Producer(s)	Length
2.	"Thank You" (with Singuila)	Davis; Schack; Biker; Bedaya N'Garo	Schack	3:13

International re-release bonus track
No.	Title	Writer(s)	Producer(s)	Length
15.	"Universal Prayer" (with Tiziano Ferro)	Davis; Tom Nichols; Ferro; Mikkel Storleer Eriksen; Tor Erik Hermansen	Stargate	4:07

Japanese edition bonus tracks
No.	Title	Length
15.	"Superstar" (Bob 'Reef' Tewlow Remix)
16.	"Superstar" (Copenhanicas Remix)
17.	"Superstar" (Ayo Supersar JD Remix)

Sample credits

- "Bout" samples Bill Conti's "Gonna Fly Now".

== Charts ==
=== Weekly charts ===
Weekly chart performance for Thank You
Chart (2003)	Peak position
Australian Albums (ARIA)	63
Australian Urban Albums (ARIA)	10
Austrian Albums (Ö3 Austria)	62
Belgian Albums (Ultratop Flanders)	74
Dutch Albums (Album Top 100)	84
French Albums (SNEP)	52
German Albums (Offizielle Top 100)	56
Irish Albums (IRMA)	21
New Zealand Albums (RMNZ)	16
Scottish Albums (OCC)	11
Swiss Albums (Schweizer Hitparade)	33
UK Albums (OCC)	4
UK R&B Albums (OCC)	2

=== Year-end charts ===
2004 year-end chart performance for Thank You
Chart (2004)	Position
UK Albums (OCC)	35

2005 year-end chart performance for Thank You
Chart (2005)	Position
UK Albums (OCC)	194

== Certifications ==
Certifications for Thank You
Region	Certification	Certified units/sales
United Kingdom (BPI)	Platinum	300,000^{*}
^{*} Sales figures based on certification alone.
