= Universal Prayer =

Universal Prayer may refer to

- The Universal Prayer, a poem by Alexander Pope
- Universal Prayer, a setting of Pope's poem to music by Andrzej Panufnik
- Universal Prayer (song), a song by Jamelia and Tiziano Ferro
