= International Love =

2011 single by Pitbull

Single by Pitbull featuring Chris Brown

from the album Planet Pit
- Released: November 1, 2011
- Recorded: 2010–2011
- Studio: SoulPower, Los Angeles; Al Burna & Hit Factory Criteria, Miami, Florida
- Genre: Dance-pop; electropop; pop rap
- Length: 3:47
- Label: Polo Grounds; J; Mr. 305; RCA
- Songwriters: Armando C. Perez; Carsten Shack; Peter Biker; Sean Hurley; Claude Kelly
- Producers: Carsten Shack; Sean Hurley; Peter Biker

Pitbull singles chronology
"Bailando Por El Mundo" (2011)	"International Love" (2011)	"U Know It Ain't Love" (2011)

Chris Brown singles chronology
"Wet the Bed" (2011)	"International Love" (2011)	"Another Round" (2011)

Music video
- "International Love" on YouTube

"International Love" is a song by American rapper and singer Pitbull featuring fellow American singer Chris Brown from the former's studio album, Planet Pit (2011). The song was written by Pitbull, Claude Kelly, and producers Soulshock, Peter Biker, Sean Hurley.

The song was first released on May 27, 2011, as the first promotional single from the album. However, on October 11, 2011, the single started airing on rhythmic radio in the US, and was finally released as the fourth and final official single on November 1, 2011, when it impacted US mainstream radio. It peaked at number 13 on the US Billboard Hot 100 chart.

The song also received publicity when it was featured prominently in the trailer for the 2012 film Step Up Revolution.

== Background and composition ==
"International Love"
A 24-second sample of part of the chorus of "International Love", which features vocals from Chris Brown, comparing women from New York City, Los Angeles and Miami.

"International Love" first appeared online in January 2011. Later that year, "International Love" was released as a promotional single on May 29, 2011. Later, the song was released as the fourth official single from the album on November 1, 2011.

The song was written by Pitbull, Soulshock, Peter Biker, Sean Hurley and Claude Kelly, and it was produced by Soulshock, Biker and Hurley. American R&B recording artist Chris Brown provides guest vocals on the hook and bridge. The song is a dance-pop song and is written in the key of C minor with a tempo of 120 beats per minute, following the strong "world dance music" feel of the other singles of the album.

== Critical reception ==
Robbie Daw of Idolator wrote: "It is an energetic floorfiller not unlike Breezy’s current hit 'Yeah 3x', and it finds the two praising women. Of course, there are no women like the ones in Miami for Pitbull. We can totally hear this finding a home on the radio." Bill Lamb of About.com praised Brown's vocal performance, writing: "Chris Brown delivers a beautiful vocal on the choruses." Jesse Cataldo of Slant Magazine wrote: "The track might have felt convincing. As delivered by Pitbull and Chris Brown, it feels juvenile and boastful, a puerile fantasy with zero appeal."

Josh Langhoff of PopMatters commented: "So in the interest of increasing his market share and his genetic footprint, Pitbull has decided to grow his brand and sink it deep into virgin territory. He positions himself for action, feels out the strategic gaps, and fills them with his acumen, forever keeping his eye on the back end." Richard of "DJ Booth" stated: "The Claude Kelly-penned smash is a Pit single par excellence, with all the dancefloor-scorching synth grooves and brilliantly mindless rhymes that entails. In between the headliner’s globally-conscious expressions of horniness, R&B heavyweight Chris Brown takes the reins, adding a dose of star power on the hook and bridge."

== Chart performance ==
"International Love" debuted at number 59 on the US Billboard Hot 100 chart, on the week of February 11, 2012. The song was originally released at a promo single for the album. The song left the chart in the following week. Five months later, the single re-entered the chart at number 92 after the song was released for Mainstream airplay. After climbing the chart for the 11 more weeks, it reached its peak at number 13 on the chart, on the week of February 11, 2012. The single also peaked at number one on US Hot Dance Club Songs chart. On October 16, 2020, the single was certified triple platinum by the Recording Industry Association of America (RIAA) for combined sales and streaming equivalent units of over three million units in the United States.

Outside of the US, "International Love" entered the ARIA Singles Charts in Australia at number 48 on November 27, 2011, due to strong digital sales from the album. Following the single's official release, the song re-entered the chart at number 34 on January 15, 2012, and has since peaked at number 27. It has been certified gold by the Australian Recording Industry Association (ARIA) for sales of 35,000 digital downloads. In the United Kingdom, "International Love" debuted at number 142 on the UK Singles Chart on the issue dated December 14, 2011. The following week, the song rose to number 99, before dropping to number 94 the week after. In its fourth week on the chart, rose to number 44. The following week, it moved to number 23 after selling 12,639 units. In its sixth week on the chart, the song reached number thirteen with sales of 18,620 copies. It eventually reached its peaked at number ten on the chart. It also reached number one in Slovakia.

== Music video ==
The music video was first released onto Pitbull's official Vevo channel on December 8, 2011. The video shows the duo traveling the world by CGI and green screen effects. The various cityscapes are projected behind the sharply dressed guys as they rap and sing about living it up and loving the many ladies around the world. The video has received over one billion views.

In the song, Pitbull rapped two verses but in the video, he rapped three verses, a new verse in the beginning. Erin Strecker of Entertainment Weekly's Music Mix, described the video, writing: "The extra-planetary party is a greenscreen orgy in the sky, complete with women, dance moves, and some oddly placed all-American body paint (at 3:20)."

== Live performances ==
The duo performed the song on February 16, 2012, at the Premio Lo Nuestro 2012. Brown's performance was criticized because of his lip-synching. On February 26, 2012, the song was performed by both singers in a medley during the halftime of 2012 NBA All-Star Game in Orlando.

== Track listing ==
- Digital download
1. "International Love" – 3:49
- CD single
1. "International Love" (Album version) – 3:49
2. "International Love" (Jump Smokers! Radio Mix) – 4:27

== Credits and personnel ==
Credits adapted from Planet Pit album liner notes.

- Pitbull – songwriter
- Soulshock – songwriter, producer, arranger, instrumentation, recording and mixing
- Peter Biker – songwriter, producer, arranger and instrumentation
- Sean Hurley – songwriter, keyboards and additional production
- Claude Kelly – songwriter and backing vocals
- Al Burna – Pitbull vocal recording
- Brian Springer – Chris Brown vocal recording
- Manny Marroquin – mixing
- Erik Madrid – assistant mixing
- Chris Galland – assistant mixing

== Charts ==
=== Weekly charts ===
Chart (2011–2012)	Peak position
Australia (ARIA)	15
Austria (Ö3 Austria Top 40)	8
Belgium (Ultratop 50 Flanders)	20
Belgium (Ultratop 50 Wallonia)	13
Canada (Canadian Hot 100)	10
Canada CHR/Top 40 (Billboard)	3
Czech Republic Airplay (ČNS IFPI)	5
Denmark (Tracklisten)	30
Finland (Suomen virallinen lista)	7
France (SNEP)	6
Germany (GfK)	21
Global Dance Tracks (Billboard)	5
Hungary (Dance Top 40)	6
Hungary (Rádiós Top 40)	4
Hungary (Single Top 40)	2
Ireland (IRMA)	8
Japan Hot 100 (Billboard)	38
Lebanon (The Official Lebanese Top 20)	17
Mexico (Billboard Mexican Airplay)	16
Mexico Anglo (Monitor Latino)	5
Netherlands (Dutch Top 40)	35
Netherlands (Single Top 100)	61
New Zealand (Recorded Music NZ)	7
Norway (VG-lista)	13
Romania (Romanian Top 100)	44
Russia Airplay (TopHit)	4
Scottish Singles Sales (Official Charts)	8
Slovakia (IFPI)	1
South Korea International Singles	33
Spain (Promusicae)	3
Spain (Airplay Chart)	9
Sweden (Sverigetopplistan)	34
Switzerland (Schweizer Hitparade)	13
UK Singles (Official Charts)	10
UK Official Streaming Chart Top 100	76
US Billboard Hot 100	13
US Adult Pop Airplay (Billboard)	30
US Dance Airplay (Billboard)	4
US Dance Club Songs (Billboard)	1
US Hot Rap Songs (Billboard)	15
US Hot Latin Songs (Billboard)	9
US Latin Airplay (Billboard)	9
US Latin Pop Airplay (Billboard)	4
US Pop Airplay (Billboard)	6
US Rhythmic Airplay (Billboard)	6

2025–2026 weekly chart performance for "International Love"
Chart (2025–2026)	Peak position
Lithuania (AGATA)	41
Poland (Polish Streaming Top 100)	68

=== Year-end charts ===
Chart (2012)	Position
Australia (ARIA)	96
Austria (Ö3 Austria Top 40)	43
Belgium (Ultratop Wallonia)	55
Brazil (Crowley)	185
Canada (Canadian Hot 100)	40
France (SNEP)	42
Hungary (Dance Top 40)	35
Hungary (Rádiós Top 40)	75
Russia Airplay (TopHit)	42
Spain (PROMUSICAE)	26
Sweden (Sverigetopplistan)	87
Switzerland (Schweizer Hitparade)	53
UK Singles (Official Charts Company)	80
US Billboard Hot 100	48
US Dance Club Songs (Billboard)	46
US Hot Latin Songs (Billboard)	29
US Mainstream Top 40 (Billboard)	39
US Rhythmic (Billboard)	31

== Certifications ==
Certifications for "International Love"
Region	Certification	Certified units/sales
Australia (ARIA)	3× Platinum	210,000^{^}
Austria (IFPI Austria)	Gold	15,000^{*}
Canada (Music Canada)	3× Platinum	240,000^{*}
Denmark (IFPI Danmark)	Gold	15,000^{^}
Germany (BVMI)	Platinum	600,000^{‡}
Italy (FIMI)	Gold	15,000^{*}
Japan (RIAJ)	Gold	100,000^{*}
Mexico (AMPROFON)	Platinum+Gold	90,000^{*}
New Zealand (RMNZ)	2× Platinum	60,000^{‡}
Norway (IFPI Norway)	3× Platinum	30,000^{*}
Spain (Promusicae)	Platinum	60,000^{‡}
Switzerland (IFPI Switzerland)	Platinum	30,000^{^}
United Kingdom (BPI)	Platinum	600,000^{‡}
United States (RIAA)	5× Platinum	5,000,000^{‡}
Streaming
Denmark (IFPI Danmark)	2× Platinum	1,800,000^{†}
^{*} Sales figures based on certification alone.^{^} Shipments figures based on certification alone.^{‡} Sales+streaming figures based on certification alone.^{†} Streaming-only figures based on certification alone.

== Release history ==
Country	Date	Format
United States	May 27, 2011	Digital download – promo single
United States	October 11, 2011	Rhythmic radio
United States	November 1, 2011	Mainstream radio
Australia	November 7, 2011	Contemporary hit radio
United Kingdom	November 14, 2011	Digital download
Germany	February 10, 2012	CD single

== See also ==
- List of number-one dance singles of 2012 (U.S.)
