= Bout =

Bout can mean:

== People ==
- Viktor Bout, suspected arms dealer
- Jan Everts Bout, early settler to New Netherland
- Marcel Bout

== Musical instruments ==
- The outward-facing round parts of the body shape of violins, guitars, and other stringed instruments

== Other ==
- "Bout" (song), a single by the British artist Jamelia
- A boxing match
- A roller derby match
- An episode of illness
