= Walk with Me (Jamelia album) =

2006 album

Studio album by Jamelia
- Released: 25 September 2006
- Genre: R&B
- Length: 41:48
- Label: Parlophone
- Producer: Peter Biker; Stuart Crichton; Cutfather & Joe; Fort Knox Five; Jimmy Hogarth; Greg Kurstin; Matt Prime; Fraser T Smith; Soulshock & Karlin

Jamelia chronology
Thank You (2003)	Walk with Me (2006)	Superstar - The Hits (2007)

Singles from Walk With Me
- 1. "Something About You" Released: 11 September 2006; 2. "Beware of the Dog" Released: 4 December 2006; 3. "No More" Released: 19 March 2007

Walk with Me is the third studio album by English singer-songwriter Jamelia. It was released by Parlophone Records on 25 September 2006 in the United Kingdom. Jamelia was influenced by a variety of musical genres and wanted to reflect that on the album, something she achieved by working with a variety of different producers such as Soulshock & Karlin, Stuart Crichton, Greg Kurstin, Fraser T Smith, and Jimmy Hogarth, among others. Walk with Me debuted and peaked at number 20 on the UK Albums Chart and spawned the singles "Something About You", "Beware of the Dog" and "No More".

== Background ==
After the release of her second studio album (2003), Jamelia took a break from her career to give birth to her second daughter Tiani. Whilst she was pregnant she started writing new material but due to her new-found happiness she found the process frustrating: "When I first tried to write, I was five months pregnant and every song was either rubbish or insincere. I thought I needed to write another Thank You, but I was so sickeningly happy, I couldn't write anything with any strong emotion." It was not until after she gave birth that she was able to rediscover her songwriting skills and start laying down the foundations for her third album. Eager to continue her growth as an artist, Jamelia was determined to continue making music that reflected her personality and musical outlook: "My whole aim was to do something different. I do not believe in giving people something that they have already heard from me. We know what worked the last time (on Thank You) but I think changing and reinventing yourself is the way forward."

== Critical reception ==
Professional ratings
Review scores
Source	Rating
AllMusic	3/5 stars
The Guardian	4/5 stars
MusicOMH	4/5 stars
Q	4/5 stars
The Skinny	3/5 stars
The Times	4/5 stars
Yahoo! Music UK	6/10

The Guardian critic Caroline Sullivan called the album "a set full of glittering, A-list moments and wrote: "Jamelia has made strides as a singer, too, and is silkily assured – as she has to be, if she's to give Beyoncé a run for her money. Her beguiling vulnerability has been sacrificed, but strength and power have emerged in its stead." AllMusic editor Sharon Mawer found that "the album lost its way a little in the middle as "La La Love," "Go," and "Get Up, Get Out" are rather insipid, chugging mid-tempo ballads, and then it's back to R&B-soul on "Got It so Good." The album closed with "Hustle," a Latin-grooved dance track that did exactly what you would expect, and a good way to end an album, leaving the audience wanting more." The Daily Telegraph wrote that "there's a spark of life to this album."

Kitty Empire, writing for The Observer, felt that Walk with Me "is both spirited and sensible, sustaining tunes all the while. There's a steady pop production hand at work which means much of the album's mid-section treads water nicely enough as it recalls Liberty X [...] And while Walk with Me hasn't quite got it all, exactly – Jamelia's voice is too often slimline and catchless, for one – the album only adds to her ineluctable jamminess." BBC critic Talia Kraines called the album "a continuation of the brilliant singles, mundane albums routine" on Jamelia's previous projects. John Murphy from MusicOMH declared Walk with Me "Jamelia's finest album yet. Now happily engaged and the mother of two children, she may be a million miles away from the relationship that inspired her earlier songs, but she retains an edge and class that cements her position as this country's leading soul vocalist," continuing "that trend of strong songwriting" with "the finest pop-soul you'll find this side of the Sugababes."

== Chart performance ==
Upon its release, Walk with Me entered the UK Top 75 albums chart at number 20 before dropping to number 44 the following week and quickly falling off the album chart. However, in January 2007, the album witnessed a resurgence when it re-entered the top 75 chart at number fifty-one, and climbed again to number 45 the following week. By September 2007, Walk with Me had sold 107,000 copies in the United Kingdom where it had been certified gold by the British Phonographic Industry (BPI). The album has also reached gold status in Poland, indicating sales in excess of 10,000 units.

== Track listing ==
No.	Title	Writer(s)	Producer(s)	Length
1.	"Something About You"	Jamelia Davis; Carsten Schack; Peter Biker	Soulshock; Biker	3:25
2.	"Do Me Right" (featuring Afrika Bambaataa)	Davis; Afrika Bambaataa; Matt Prime; Hannah Robinson; Steven Albert; Sidney Barcelona; Jon Horvath; Rob Myers; Steve Raskin	Fort Knox Five	3:39
3.	"Window Shopping"	Davis; Matt Prime; Robinson	Prime	3:38
4.	"Know My Name"	Davis; Karen Poole; Schack; Biker	Soulshock; Biker	3:28
5.	"No More"	Davis; Stuart Crichton; Tommy Lee James; The Stranglers	Crichton	2:54
6.	"Ain't a Love"	Davis; Prime; Robinson; Joe Belmaati; Mich Hansen	Cutfather & Joe	3:46
7.	"La La Love"	Fraser T Smith; Nina Woodford	Smith	3:38
8.	"Go"	Davis; Eg White	Jimmy Hogarth	3:26
9.	"Get Up, Get Out"	Davis; Carsten Schack; Kenneth Karlin	Soulshock & Karlin	3:18
10.	"Beware of the Dog"	Davis; Crichton; James; Poole; Martin Gore	Crichton	3:09
11.	"Got It So Good"	Davis; Prime; Robinson	Prime	3:36
12.	"Hustle" (featuring Sway)	Davis; Prime; Robinson	Prime	3:32

Digital edition bonus track
No.	Title	Writer(s)	Producer(s)	Length
13.	"Tripping Over You"	Greg Kurstin	Kurstin	2:53

Sample credits'

- "No More" contains a sample of "Golden Brown" by The Stranglers.
- "Ain't a Love" contains a drum sample from "Jungle Jazz" by Kool & the Gang.
- "Beware of the Dog" contains a sample of "Personal Jesus" by Depeche Mode.

== Charts ==
Chart (2006)	Peak position
Irish Albums (IRMA)	67
Scottish Albums (OCC)	25
Swiss Albums (Schweizer Hitparade)	74
UK Albums (OCC)	20
UK R&B Albums (OCC)	9

== Certifications ==
Certifications for Walk With Me
Region	Certification	Certified units/sales
Poland (ZPAV)	Gold	10,000^{*}
United Kingdom (BPI)	Gold	100,000^{^}
^{*} Sales figures based on certification alone.^{^} Shipments figures based on certification alone.

== Release history ==
List of release dates, showing region, formats, label, and catalog number
Region	Date	Label	Format(s)	Ref
United Kingdom	25 September 2006	Parlophone Records	CD; digital download	
Australia	17 March 2007	Parlophone Records	CD; digital download	
