= Something About You (Jamelia song) =

2006 single by Jamelia

Single by Jamelia

from the album Walk with Me
- Released: 11 September 2006
- Length: 3:24
- Label: Parlophone
- Songwriters: Peter Biker; Jamelia Davis; Carsten Schack
- Producers: Soulshock; Peter Biker

Jamelia singles chronology
"DJ" / "Stop" (2004)	"Something About You" (2006)	"Beware of the Dog" (2006)

"Something About You" is a song by English singer-songwriter Jamelia. It was written by Jamelia, Carsten "Soulshock" Schack, and Peter Biker for her third studio album, Walk with Me (2006), while production was helmed by Biker and Schack. Jamelia described the sound of the song as being more "experimental and not as "R&B" as her previous material." "Something About You" was released as the album's lead single on 11 September 2006.

== Chart performance ==
"Something About You," released as a download single first, charted at number 28 upon its download release on the official UK Singles Chart, the second highest new entry on downloads alone in that week. The physical formats were released one day after the song had charted on downloads only. It rose to number 10 in its second week on the chart and rose again to number nine in its third week. "Something About You" also climbed into the top five of the UK's radio airplay chart, peaking at number four in its third week.

== Music video ==
An accompanying music video for "Something About You" was directed by Stuart Orme. The clip begins with two scenes alternating between her doing various poses against a glass window and her standing by a bed, showing the camera zooming out to show a man. Halfway through the video, Jamelia is having what seems to be a tea party on a grass and one scene shows her in a thin walkway with white walls. The video premiered on Channel 4 in August 2006.

== Track listings ==
UK single
No.	Title	Length
1.	"Something About You" (single edit)
2.	"Stop"

UK DVD single
No.	Title	Length
1.	"Something About You" (single edit)
2.	"Love Me"
3.	"Superstar" (Copenhaniacs remix)
4.	"Something About You" (video)
5.	"Something About You" (making of the video)

UK 12-inch vinyl
No.	Title	Length
1.	"Something About You" (single edit)
2.	"Superstar" (Copenhaniacs remix)

Australian CD single
No.	Title	Length
1.	"Something About You" (single edit)	3:22
2.	"Something About You" (Linus Loves extended remix)	7:22
3.	"Something About You" (Mr. Oizo mix)	3:56
4.	"Something About You" (H-Money refix)	4:16

== Charts ==
=== Weekly charts ===
Weekly chart performance for "Something About You"
Chart (2006–2007)	Peak position
Australia (ARIA)	17
Australian Urban (ARIA)	4
Austria (Ö3 Austria Top 40)	43
Belgium (Ultratop 50 Flanders)	26
Belgium (Ultratip Bubbling Under Wallonia)	4
Germany (GfK)	59
Ireland (IRMA)	28
Italy (FIMI)	40
Netherlands (Dutch Top 40 Tipparade)	11
Netherlands (Single Top 100)	73
Scotland Singles (Official Charts)	5
Switzerland (Schweizer Hitparade)	46
Ukraine Airplay (TopHit) Remix	179
UK Singles (Official Charts)	9
UK Hip Hop/R&B (Official Charts)	4

=== Year-end charts ===
Year-end chart performance for "Something About You"
Chart (2006)	Position
UK Singles (OCC)	119
Chart (2007)	Position
Australian Urban (ARIA)	40

== Release history ==
Release dates and formats for "Something About You"
Region	Date	Format	Label	Ref.
United Kingdom	11 September 2006	CD	Parlophone	
Australia	3 March 2007	CD	Parlophone	
