= DJ (Jamelia song) =

2004 single by Jamelia

Single by Jamelia

from the album Thank You
- A-side: "Stop"
- Released: 1 November 2004
- Length: 3:45
- Label: Parlophone
- Songwriters: Alex Cantrall; Jamelia Davis; Kenneth Karlin; Olivia Longott; Carsten Schack; Philip White
- Producer: Soulshock & Karlin

Jamelia singles chronology
"Universal Prayer" (2004)	"DJ" / "Stop" (2004)	"Something About You" (2006)

"DJ" is a song by English singer Jamelia. It was written by Jamelia, Carsten Schack, Kenneth Karlin, Philip White, Alex Cantrall and Olivia Longott for the reissue of her second studio album, Thank You (2003), while production was helmed by Schack and Karlin under their production moniker Soulshock & Karlin. The song takes its main tune from Raymond Guiot's "Primitive Spirit". "DJ" was released as the fifth and final single from the album on a double A-side along with Jamelia's cover of Sam Brown's song "Stop".

== Promotion and chart performance ==
"DJ" was released on 1 November 2004, one of the busiest release weeks of the year competing with Eminem, Destiny's Child, Usher & Alicia Keys, Britney Spears, and Christina Aguilera & Missy Elliott. However, the single still managed to get a UK top ten place, despite the stiff competition and became her fourth consecutive top ten hit, spending twelve weeks inside the UK Singles Chart, one week longer than "See It in a Boy's Eyes", despite having a lower peak. The single also became her fourth consecutive top forty hit in Australia, peaking at number thirty-seven there.

== Track listings ==
UK CD single 1
No.	Title	Length
1.	"DJ" (Radio Edit)
2.	"Stop"

UK CD single 2
No.	Title	Length
1.	"DJ" (Radio Edit)
2.	"Stop"
3.	"Last Christmas"
4.	"Stop" (Video)

UK DVD single
No.	Title	Length
1.	"DJ" (Radio Edit)
2.	"Last Christmas"
3.	"DJ" (Beatguru Mix)
4.	"DJ" (Video)

== Charts ==
All entries charted as "DJ" / "Stop" unless otherwise noted.

=== Weekly charts ===
Chart (2004–2005)	Peak position
Australia (ARIA)	37
Belgium (Ultratop 50 Flanders)	46
Belgium (Ultratip Bubbling Under Wallonia)	6
CIS Airplay (TopHit) "DJ" only	6
Hungary (Dance Top 40) "DJ" only	25
Ireland (IRMA)	12
Russia Airplay (TopHit) "DJ" only	3
Scottish Singles Sales (Official Charts)	10
Switzerland (Schweizer Hitparade)	36
UK Singles (Official Charts)	9
UK Hip Hop/R&B (Official Charts)	6

=== Year-end charts ===
Chart (2004)	Position
Russia Airplay (TopHit)	139
UK Singles (OCC)	107

Chart (2005)	Position
CIS Airplay (TopHit)	114
Russia Airplay (TopHit)	105
