= Peter Biker =

Danish record producer and songwriter

- Born: 10 May 1961 (age 64); Denmark
- Genres: Pop, R&B, Hip hop
- Occupations: Singer, songwriter, record producer, musician
- Years active: 1980–present

Peter Biker (born 10 May 1961) is a Danish record producer and songwriter. He is also a musician drummer and keyboard player. He has produced or written for many local Danish and international acts. He was on the judging panels of shows like Stjerneskud and Popstars

== Career ==
In the 1980s, Peter Biker started as a drummer in News, a popular Danish pop group. He started as drummer of the band, and then as keyboard player. He stayed with the band until its break-up in 1994. After that he went solo and released his debut solo album Kys dig når du går in 1987.

Later on he moved to songwriting and producing and is well known for cooperation with many successful Danish artists including Szhirley, SOAP, TV·2, Søs Fenger, Lis Sørensen, Det Brune Punktum, Juice and Heidi Herløw. He also worked closely with producer Soulshock.

In 1995 he was part of the panel of judges in the reality television talent competition, Stjerneskud on TV 3, and in 2003 he evaluated the competitors in Danish singing competition Popstars Showtime! on TV 2.

Biker wrote the song "Faster" for Caroline Henderson that was nominated for "Radio Hit of the Year" at the Danish Grammy Award 1999. Together with Kim Sagild and Stig Kreutzfeldt, he wrote the song "Selv en dråbe" for the victims in Kosovo in 2000. In 2010, together with the three X-Factor judges Soulshock, Pernille Rosendahl and Remee, he wrote "My Dream", which became first single for the winner of the Danish edition of the Danish X Factor in 2010.

Peter has been writing, composing, and producing music for numbers of Danish as well as international artists. He often collaborates alongside fellow writer and producer Soulshock over in the US. In 2012, he has had success with Pitbull feat. Chris Brown ("International Love"). Other collaborations include Monica, Usher, Victoria Beckham, Sugababes, Craig David, Jay Sean and Jamelia. Thank You became Jamelia's highest charting single in the UK to date, peaking at No. 2. The song earned Peter an Ivor Novello nomination for "most performed song" in 2005.

He is son of the Danish musician Pedro Biker He has three daughters.

== Discography ==
=== Studio albums ===
- 1987: Kys dig når du går

=== Songwriting/ Producing ===
(selective)

- Monster: "SuperJunior (co-writing album track)
- Jay Sean, "Good Enough" (writing album track)
- Atom, "Safe & Sound" and "Serious" (writing album track)
- Monrose, "Just Like That" (writing and co-producing album track)
- Jamelia, "Something About You" (writing and producing single)
- Jamelia, "Thank You" (writing and producing single)
- Jamelia: "Know My Name" (writing and producing album track)
- Trinity Stone, "Nothing Like Him" (writing and producing single)
- Amy Pearson, "I Wish I Was Her" (writing and producing album track)
- Sugababes, "Better" (writing and producing album track)
- Liberty X, "Its OK!" (writing and producing single)
- Keisha White, "Why" (writing and producing album track)
- Terri Walker, "Slow It Up" and "The One That Got Away" (writing and producing album tracks)
- Nina Jayne, "Circles" (writing and producing single)
- Nina Jayne, "Complete" (writing and producing album track)
- Lemar, "Call Me Daddy" (writing and producing album track)
- Jay Sean, "On & On" (writing and producing album track)
- Javine, "Let Me Go" (writing and producing album track)
- Smujj, "Bring It" (writing and producing album track)
- Craig David, "You Don't Miss The Water" (Remix & Re-vocal production of single)
- Monica, "Hurts The Most" (writing and producing single)
- Usher, "She's Got The Part" (writing and producing album track)
- Victoria Beckham, "I Wish" (writing and producing single)
- Maria, "Hate To Love You", "Simplified", "Always", "Nowadays", "Lonely" (co-writing and producing album track)
- LMNT "Keep It Coming" (co-writing and produsing album track)
- Tracie Spencer, "Unbelieveable" [sic] (cowriting and producingh single)
