= I Do (Jamelia song) =

Single by Jamelia

from the album Drama
- Released: 19 July 1999
- Recorded: 1999
- Genre: R&B
- Length: 3:17 (radio mix); 5:29 (album version)
- Label: Parlophone
- Songwriter(s): Jamelia Davis; D. De'Bourg; Colin Emmanuel
- Producer(s): Colin Emmanuel

Jamelia singles chronology
| "So High" (1999) | "I Do" (1999) | "Money" (2000) |

"I Do" is the second single from British R&B singer Jamelia. It was the first single from her debut album Drama and was her first UK top 40 hit, peaking at number 36 on the UK Singles Chart. The Spanish Mix has Slum Village rapping on it as well as a UK rapper named Dubwise (Junior Williams). The track was originally remixed with only Dubwise rapping.

== Track listing ==
1. "I Do" (radio mix)
2. "I Do" (Raw Soul remix)
3. "I Do" (Capital T mix – single edit)
4. "I Do" (Rugged Tuff mix)
5. "I Do" (Spanish mix; featuring Slum Village)
6. "I Do" (Enhanced section – including video and photographs)

== Charts ==
Chart performance for "I Do"
| Chart (1999) | Peak position |
|---|---|
| Scotland (OCC) | 95 |
| UK Singles (OCC) | 36 |
| UK Dance (OCC) | 14 |
| UK Hip Hop/R&B (OCC) | 7 |
