= Tatiana Karelina =

Russian entrepreneur

- Karelina with bundles of Russian hair in 2026
- Born: 20 July 1980 (age 46); Kashin, Soviet Union
- Occupation: Entrepreneur
- Website: www.tatianakarelina.co.uk

Tatiana Karelina (born 1980) is a Russian entrepreneur living in London, United Kingdom. She is the founder of Tatiana Karelina, a chain of self-named salons specialising in hair extensions with locations in Los Angeles, London and Manchester. She is credited for introducing the Micro Ring hair extension technique from the United States into the UK. The business makes made-to-measure clip-in pieces, ponytails and braids by hand, custom hair toppers for women with thinning hair, and made-to-measure medical wigs.

== Early life ==
Karelina, was born to Soviet parents in Kashin, Russia, a rural agricultural area 250 km north-east of Moscow. In 2000, at the age of 20, Karelina left Kashin on a student's visa for the United States, where she spent the summer learning English. In 2002, she graduated from Tver State University with a degree in linguistics before moving to London, where she took an apprenticeship with Lucinda Ellery, a salon that specialised in hair loss and hair extensions.

== Career ==
In 2006, Karelina left Lucinda Ellery to set up Tatiana Hair Extensions from her 1-bedroom house in Barnet. Over the next few years, she built her reputation as one of the UK's premier hair extensionists by combining micro rings with high-quality Russian hair and her proprietary "strand-by-strand" colour blending technique. But it was on the back of the British Broadcasting company (BBC Three) documentary Jamelia: Whose Hair Is It Anyway? that she rose to prominence and at the height of the financial crisis Karelina took a leap of faith and set up her own salon in Kensington, England. Success quickly followed and she opened a second salon in Manchester in 2010. In 2011, Karelina was approached by Sky UK's Moscow correspondent, Amanda Walker to accompany her to Russia to film a documentary on the hair extension industry in Russia. In 2015, Karelina rebranded from Tatiana Hair Extensions to Tatiana Karelina as a precursor for their entry into the United States. In February 2016, Karelina made her foray into session styling at the Felder Felder London Fashion Week show where she was credited with creating one of the most talked-about hairstyles of the week, the Unicorn Braid. In October 2017, Karelina opened a salon in West Hollywood and her proximity to Hollywood enabled her to expand her celebrity clientele roster which now includes Ariana Grande, Lindsay Lohan, Stacey Solomon, and Bianca Gascoigne,

Ariana Grande wore Karelina's extensions during the UK dates of her 2019 Sweetener World Tour. Grande and Laura Whitmore have also worn the company's custom clip-in pieces. Other clients have included Emma Thompson, Emma Stone and Lindsay Lohan. Karelina also made a clip-in braid worn by Made in Chelsea cast member Sophie Hermann.

Alongside extensions and styling pieces, her salons make custom toppers for thinning hair. These are made by hand, with hair tied into a mesh base, then fitted and cut to blend with the client's own hair. The business also makes made-to-measure wigs for people experiencing hair loss.

In September 2019 the Evening Standard reviewed the Kensington salon, describing its method of hand selecting strands from several ponytails of Russian hair to match each client's colour and fitting them with small metal rings rather than glue or heat. Grazia includes the Kensington salon in its list of the best hair salons in London. Karelina has been quoted as a hair extension specialist in the British press, including HELLO! and The Independent.

In 2026 Karelina founded TK Academy, which teaches hair extension techniques through an online course with an AI teaching assistant and through in-person classes in London.

== In popular culture ==
Karelina custom created Ariana Grande's signature ponytail worn during her 2019 Sweetener World Tour

Emma Thompson in the 2016 Hollywood film The Meyerowitz Stories wore a custom hairpiece created by Karelina designed to give Emma the look of a dishevelled alcoholic. The Huffington Post ranked Emma's hairstyle number 4 in their article "19 Emma Thompson Hairstyles, Ranked".

Emma Stone wore a reddish-brown Karelina ponytail in the 2019 Hollywood sequel Zombieland: Double Tap
