= Money (Jamelia song) =

2000 single by Jamelia

Single by Jamelia featuring Beenie Man

from the album Drama
- Released: 21 February 2000
- Length: 6:19 (album version); 4:01 (radio edit)
- Label: Rhythm Series
- Songwriters: Jamelia Davis; Colin Emmanuel; Daniel de Bourg; Moses Davies
- Producer: Colin Emmanuel

Jamelia singles chronology
| "I Do" (1999) | "Money" (2000) | "Call Me" (2000) |

Beenie Man singles chronology
| "Mary's Got a Baby" (1999) | "Money" (2000) | "Love Me Now" (2000) |

Music video
- "Money" on YouTube

"Money" is the a song by British R&B singer Jamelia, released as the second single from her debut album, Drama (2000), on 21 February 2000. Originally, "Thinking 'Bout You" was to be the second single from the album; a video was filmed and promotional copies of the single were sent to radio stations across the UK. That single was cancelled and the video was never released to the public. "Money" was chosen to replace "Thinking 'Bout You" as the second single from Drama.

"Money" is considered by many to be Jamelia's breakthrough hit as the song made the UK top five upon its release, spending 11 weeks inside the UK top 100. The song features reggae star Beenie Man and was co-written by Daniel de Bourg.

== Track listings ==
All tracks feature Beenie Man.

UK CD single

1. "Money" (radio edit)
2. "Money" (Old Skool mix)
3. "Money" (Smokin Beats mix – edit)
4. "Money" (Capital T club mix – edit)
5. "Money" (Emmanuel remix)
6. "Money" (enhanced section – video)

UK 12-inch single

A1. "Money" (radio edit)
A2. "Money" (Old Skool mix)
A3. "Money" (Poisonous Crew mix)
B1. "Money" (Smokin Beats club mix – edit)
B2. "Money" (Capital T club mix – edit)

UK cassette single

A1. "Money" (radio edit)
A2. "Money" (Old Skool mix)
B1. "Money" (Smokin Beats club mix)

European CD single

1. "Money" (radio edit)
2. "Money" (Emmanuel instrumental)

European maxi-CD single

1. "Money" (radio edit)
2. "Money" (Emmanuel remix)
3. "Money" (Smokin Beats mix – edit)
4. "Money" (Capital T club mix – edit)
5. "Money" (enhanced section – video)

== Charts ==
=== Weekly charts ===
Weekly chart performance for "Money"
| Chart (2000) | Peak position |
|---|---|
| Europe (Eurochart Hot 100) | 26 |
| European Radio Top 50 (Music & Media) | 49 |
| Ireland (IRMA) | 18 |
| Netherlands (Dutch Top 40 Tipparade) | 2 |
| Netherlands (Single Top 100) | 51 |
| Scottish Singles Sales (Official Charts) | 21 |
| UK Singles (Official Charts) | 5 |
| UK Dance (Official Charts) | 5 |
| UK Hip Hop/R&B (Official Charts) | 2 |

=== Year-end charts ===
Year-end chart performance for "Money"
| Chart (2000) | Position |
|---|---|
| UK Singles (OCC) | 105 |
| UK Urban (Music Week) | 12 |
