= Beware of the Dog (song) =

2006 single by Jamelia

Single by Jamelia

from the album Walk with Me
- Released: 4 December 2006
- Length: 3:11 (album version); 4:48 (extended version)
- Label: Parlophone
- Songwriters: Martin Gore; Jamelia Davis; Stuart Crichton; Tommy Lee James; Karen Poole
- Producer: Crichton

Jamelia singles chronology
"Something About You" (2006)	"Beware of the Dog" (2006)	"No More" (2007)

"Beware of the Dog" is a song by the English singer Jamelia. It was written by Jamelia, Stuart Crichton, Tommy Lee James, and Karen Poole for her third studio album Walk with Me (2006), while production was helmed by Crichton. The song is built around a sample of Depeche Mode's song "Personal Jesus" (1989), written by Martin Gore. "Beware of the Dog" was selected and released as the second single from Walk with Me in December 2006.

The song peaked at number 10 on the UK Singles Chart. In July 2007, "Beware of the Dog" was shortlisted for the Popjustice £20 Music Prize, a prize which recognizes the best British pop single over the past year. In support of the song, Jamelia performed the track with UK rock band Feeder, at their gig that was held on 9 November 2006 gig at the London Coronet. "Beware of the Dog" has also been used in the advertisement for UK television network's Channel 4 show, Goldplated. The song was also used as one of the catwalk tracks for the 2006 Victoria's Secret Fashion Show.

== Chart performance ==
"Beware of the Dog" became Jamelia's second single to enter the UK top 40, based on downloads alone. It also received high radio airplay, reaching BBC Radio 1's A-list and peaking inside the top 20 of both British television airplay and radio airplay charts. Upon its physical release, "Beware of the Dog" peaked at number 10 during its second week on the UK Singles Chart, becoming her seventh UK top-10 single. In Australia, "Beware of the Dog" debuted at number 51 on 21 May 2007 due to low digital downloads, but during its second week, it moved up to its peak of number 50.

== Music video ==
Shot in a black-and-white format, the music video for "Beware of the Dog" was filmed by Norwegian director Ray Kay. It premiered in the United Kingdom on 21 October 2006. Set in central London, it features Jamelia being driven at high speed through Soho before arriving at a nightclub and performing to a crowd. Big Brother UK Series 8 housemate Nabeel "Billi" Bhatti starred in the video.

In 2013, several scenes from the music video served as inspiration for the music video for "Da raskinem s njom" by Serbian singer Ceca, directed by Serbian music video director Miloš Nadaždin.

== Track listings ==
UK and Dutch CD single
No.	Title	Length
1.	"Beware of the Dog"
2.	"Thank You" (Radio Edit)

UK DVD single
No.	Title	Length
1.	"Beware of the Dog" (Extended Version)
2.	"Tripping Over You"
3.	"Real Love"
4.	"Beware of the Dog" (Video)

UK 12-inch vinyl
No.	Title	Length
1.	"Beware of the Dog" (Alavi ReroX Remix)
2.	"Beware of the Dog" (Radio Slave Instrumental)

Australian CD single
No.	Title	Length
1.	"Beware of the Dog"
2.	"Something About You" (Single Edit)
3.	"Beware of the Dog" (Steve Lawler's Sesso Oscurita Mix)
4.	"Beware of the Dog" (Radio Slave Instrumental)
5.	"Beware of the Dog" (Alavi ReroX Remix)

== Charts ==
=== Weekly charts ===
Weekly chart performance for "Beware of the Dog"
Chart (2006–2007)	Peak position
Australia (ARIA)	50
Austria (Ö3 Austria Top 40)	68
Belgium (Ultratip Bubbling Under Flanders)	2
Belgium (Ultratip Bubbling Under Wallonia)	15
CIS Airplay (TopHit)	11
Czech Republic Airplay (ČNS IFPI)	36
Finland (Suomen virallinen lista)	11
Germany (GfK)	63
Ireland (IRMA)	48
Netherlands (Dutch Top 40 Tipparade)	2
Netherlands (Single Top 100)	91
New Zealand (Recorded Music NZ)	29
Romania (Romanian Top 100)	9
Russia Airplay (TopHit)	11
Scottish Singles Sales (Official Charts)	8
Slovakia Airplay (ČNS IFPI)	44
Sweden (Sverigetopplistan)	46
Ukraine Airplay (TopHit)	186
UK Singles (Official Charts)	10
UK Hip Hop/R&B (Official Charts)	2

=== Year-end charts ===
Year-end chart performance for "Beware of the Dog"
Chart (2007)	Position
Russia Airplay (TopHit)	194

== Release history ==
Release and formats for "Beware of the Dog"
Region	Date	Format	Label	Catalogue	Ref.
United Kingdom	4 December 2006	CD	Parlophone	CDR 6727	
Australia	12 May 2007	CD	Capitol	3845122	
