= So High (Jamelia song) =

1999 debut single by Amelia

Single by Jamelia
- Released: 3 May 1999
- Recorded: 1999
- Genre: R&B
- Length: 3:45
- Label: Capitol, Parlophone
- Songwriters: Jamelia Davis, Stepz, R. King, Rositta Lynch, MC D
- Producer: Lloyd Brown

Jamelia singles chronology
"So High" (1999)	"I Do" (1999)

"So High" is the debut single from British R&B singer Jamelia. It was her first single for Parlophone in 1999. The single did not chart in the UK and is rare due to the fact it did not feature on her debut album, Drama. It was also omitted from her greatest hits compilation, along with Drama singles "I Do" and "Boy Next Door".

== Critical reception ==
Yahoo's Dotmusic gave "So High" a mixed review. They stated, "New kid on the block Jamelia swings into town with this slice of R&B which never manages to rise above the mediocre. She can sing, the beats roll, the bass tones swing, the chords funk – hey, you might even find your head nodding Flat Eric style! It's just we've heard this a 1000 times before and when the chorus slips into "So high, So high...You're making me..." things take a nosedive. It's a shame as Jamelia's got a great voice and with the right production could lift a tune.

== Track listing ==
CD single

(CDRHYTHM19 / 742388684828)

1. "So High" (featuring Rositta Lynch) (original mix) – 3:45
2. "So High" (original mix without rap) – 3:45
3. "So High" (featuring Ms Ill) (Raw Soul mix) – 4:17
4. "So High" (Raw Soul instrumental) – 4:18
5. "So High" (featuring Rositta Lynch) (Ill Skills remix) – 4:20
6. "So High" (Ill Skills instrumental) – 4:20

== Credits ==
Information from the "So High" liner notes.

- Written by Jamelia Davis, Stepz, R. King
- Published by Warner Chappell Music
- Tracks 1 and 2 mixed at Pierce Rooms by Marcellus Fernadnes for Millenius Productions.
- Track 1 rap written by Rositta Lynch & MC D, rap performed by Rositta Lynch.
- Tracks 3 and 4 additional remix and production by Jonuz for Raw Soul Productions. Mixed by Jonuz, Tony "Mutley" Matthews and Bug at Soul II Soul Studios.
- Track 3 rap by Ms Ill, Ms Ill appears courtesy of Utopia Entertainment.
- Tracks 5 and 6 remix and additional production by Ill Skills for Linslee Campbell Productions. Mixed at Funk Lab Studios. Track 6 additional instruments by Linslee Campbell.
- All tracks executive producer Lloyd Brown
