= Singuila =

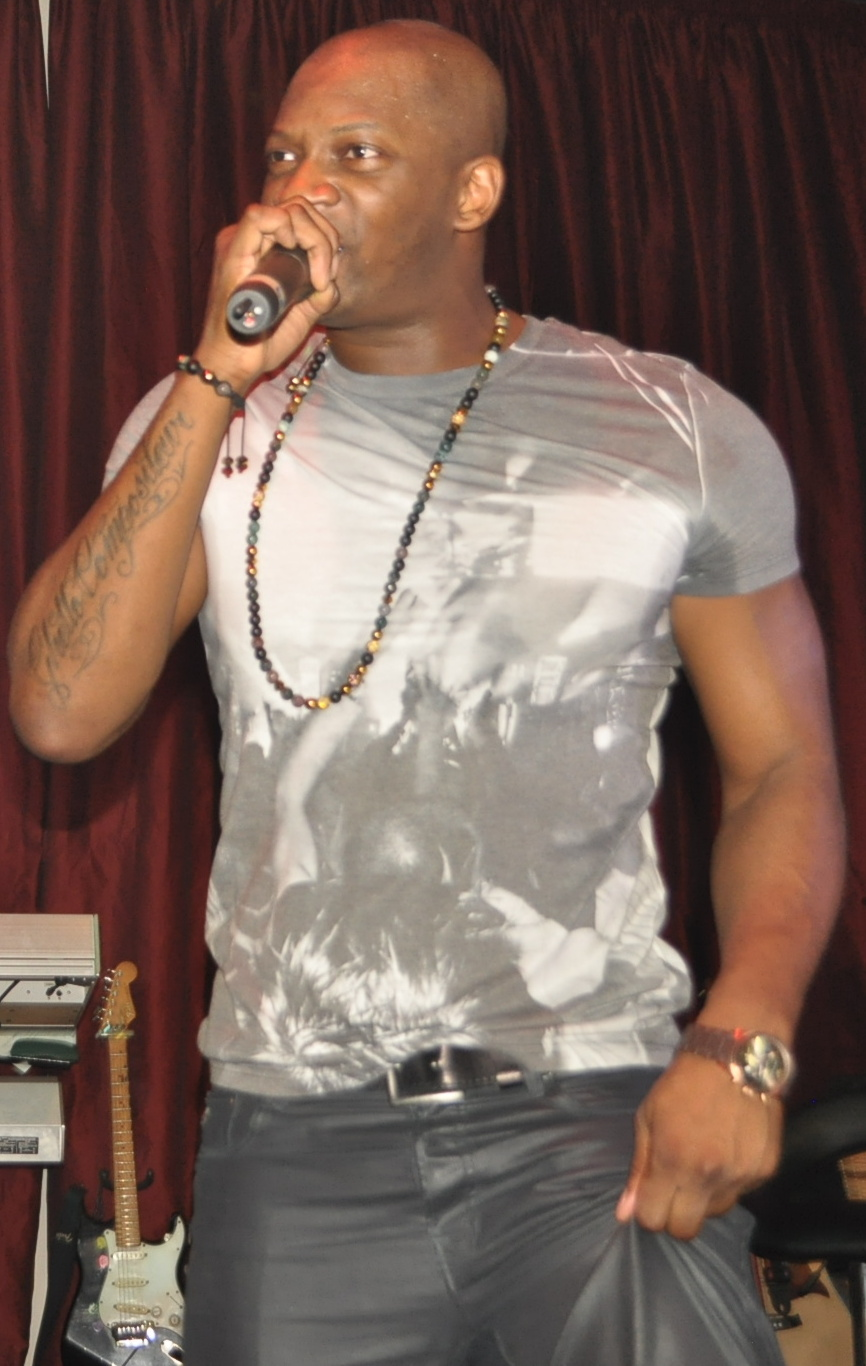

Background information
- Birth name: Bedaya Singuila N'Garo
- Origin: Suresnes, Île-de-France, France
- Genres: R&B
- Years active: 1998–present
- Labels: Secteur Ä (1998–present)
- Website: Official website

Bedaya Singuila N'Garo (born 19 September 1977 in Suresnes), better known by his stage name Singuila (French pronunciation: [siŋɡila]), is a French singer of Congolese and Central African origins. Singuila means "thank you" in Sango, a main language spoken in Central African Republic.

He released his debut album in late 2004 entitled On ne vit qu'une fois (literally "We only live once") produced by Secteur Ä, a famous French rap label. Singles from the album included "Aïcha" and "C'est Trop".

After a successful launching, he gained popularity in French-speaking countries throughout Europe. He teamed up with the British R'n'B singer Jamelia in 2004, for a French version of her hit song Thank You, which had been successful in many European countries, including the United Kingdom and the Netherlands. The new version was bilingual with Jamelia singing in English, and Singuila in French. The video featured clips of the original English video and new clips of Singuila.

In 2006, Singuila returned with a new album called Ghetto Compositeur. Singles from the album included "Le temps passe trop vite" (literally "Time passes too fast") and "Ma Nature", strengthen his position in French R'n'B circles.

== Biography ==
In 2003, he released his debut album "On ne vit qu'une fois". With this first album, the singles; "Aisha" and "C'est trop" will be hits.

In 2006, he returned with a new album called "Ghetto Composer" with Lino. The singles from the album are "Le temps passe trop vite" and "Ma nature."

In 2007, he participated in the compilation Trimmed Offset Mania: "Ca n'ment" with Kamnouze and Petit Denis. He also participates in the creation of the album Sheryfa Luna component including the title "Il avait les mots" that will quickly become a tube.

In 2008, He takes the music of "Il avait les mots" Sheryfa Luna (which he is the author) to create "Je cherchais les mots - La reponse". This song is so like the title suggested, the answer to "Il avait les mots".

In 2009, he released a new album, "Ca fait mal", just like the track 3 of the same album, that it is a tribute to his late father. "Viens, je t'en prie" and "Je suis KO" duet with Marc Anthony, are the singles from the album.

Currently, he is preparing a new album with a title, entitled "Sang chaud", is extracted and was broadcast on the Internet beginning in May 2011. Singuila has also collaborated with Nigerian artist DonTom on a female-friendly song titled "I Love You", which was released in February 2014.

Singuila is coach in "The voice Afrique francophone" 2016–2017

== Discography ==
=== Albums ===
- 2003: "On ne vit qu'une fois"
- 2006: "Ghetto Compositeur"
- 2009: "Ça fait mal"
- 2017: "Entre deux"
- 2020: "Dans la Cage Du Rossignol"
- 2021: "Docteur Love"

=== Singles ===
- 2003: "Aïcha"
- 2003: "C'est trop"
- 2003: "Ma conscience"
- 2004: "J'avance en chantant"
- 2006: "Le temps passe trop vite"
- 2006: "Ma nature"
- 2008: "Je cherchais les mots"
- 2009: "Reviens je t'en prie"
- 2009: "J'suis KO" (feat. Marc Antoine)
- 2010: "Ça fait mal"
- 2011: "Je la veux" (Hold U de Gyptian's Remix)
- 2011: "Le sang chaud"
- 2012: "Mieux loin de moi"
- 2014: "Ma liberté"
- 2014: "Rossignol"
- 2016: "Retour de flamme"
