= Boy Next Door (song) =

2000 single by Jamelia

Single by Jamelia

from the album Drama
- Released: 2 October 2000
- Recorded: 2000
- Genre: R&B
- Length: 3:24 (Radio edit); 3:38 (Album version)
- Label: Parlophone
- Songwriter(s): Jamelia Davis, R. Bennett, T. Harris
- Producer(s): Rory Bennett

Jamelia singles chronology
"Call Me" (2000)	"Boy Next Door" (2000)	"Bout" (2003)

Alternative cover
- UK CD: 2 single cover

"Boy Next Door" is a song by British R&B singer Jamelia. It was released as the fourth and final single from her debut album Drama. The song is one of two of Jamelia's singles to miss the UK top 40, peaking at No. 42 and spending only two weeks inside the top 75. The version released as a single was a slight remix to the version that appears on the album and is also slightly shorter in length.

== Track listing ==
UK CD 1

1. "Boy Next Door" (Radio Edit)
2. "Money" (Smokin Beats Club Mix Edit)
3. "Boy Next Door" (Raw Soul Mix)
4. "Boy Next Door" (Enhanced section – video & photos)

UK CD 2

1. "Boy Next Door" (Radio Edit)
2. "Boy Next Door" (Stush Mix)
3. "Boy Next Door" (Code Blue Mix)

== Charts ==
Chart (2000)	Peak position
Scotland (OCC)	61
UK Singles (OCC)	42
UK Hip Hop/R&B (OCC)	7
