= Call Me (Jamelia song) =

2000 single by Jamelia

Single by Jamelia

from the album Drama
- B-side: "Big Girl"
- Released: 12 June 2000
- Studio: Xosa (Weymouth, Dorset, UK)
- Length: 4:20 (album version); 3:36 (radio edit)
- Label: Rhythm Series
- Songwriter(s): Jamelia
- Producer(s): Emmanuel

Jamelia singles chronology
"Money" (2000)	"Call Me" (2000)	"Boy Next Door" (2000)

Alternative cover
- UK CD2 cover

"Call Me" is the fourth single from British R&B singer Jamelia and the third single from her debut album, Drama (2000). Released on 12 June 2000, "Call Me" followed "Money" into the UK top 20, peaking at No. 11. The song spent five weeks on the UK Singles Chart.

== Track listings ==
UK CD1

1. "Call Me" (radio edit)
2. "Call Me" (Goodfellas' Rising mix)
3. "Big Girl"
4. "Call Me" (enhanced video)

UK CD2

1. "Call Me" (radio edit)
2. "Call Me" (Jonuz Deep Cover mix)
3. "Call Me" (Capital T Feelgood mix)
4. "Call Me" (Messy Boy's vocal mix)

UK cassette single

1. "Call Me" (radio edit)
2. "Call Me" (Goodfellas' Rising mix)
3. "Call Me" (Capital T Feelgood mix)

== Credits and personnel ==
Credits are taken from the UK CD1 liner notes.

Recording

- Recorded at Xosa Studios (Weymouth, Dorset, UK)
- Mixed at Enterprise Studios (Burbank, California, US)

Personnel

- Jamelia – vocals, background vocals, writing
- Daniel de Bourg – background vocals
- Emmanuel – keyboards, production, programming
- Dave Pensado – mixing
- Dylan Dresdow – mixing assistant
- Phil Byrne – management
- Peacock – art direction and design
- Mike Diver – photography

== Charts ==
=== Weekly charts ===
Chart (2000)	Peak position
Europe (Eurochart Hot 100)	52
Scotland (OCC)	32
UK Singles (OCC)	11
UK Hip Hop/R&B (OCC)	3

=== Year-end charts ===
Chart (2000)	Position
UK Urban (Music Week)	25
