= Matt Kent =

American baseball player (born 1992)

Free agent
- Pitcher
- Born: September 13, 1992 (age 33); Waco, Texas, U.S.
- Bats: Left Throws: Left

CPBL debut
- April 2, 2023, for the Fubon Guardians

CPBL statistics (through 2024 season)
- Win–loss record: 9–14
- Earned run average: 3.27
- Strikeouts: 90
- Stats at Baseball Reference

Teams
- Fubon Guardians (2023); Rakuten Monkeys (2024)

Matthew Allen Kent (born September 13, 1992) is an American professional baseball pitcher who is a free agent. He has previously played in the Chinese Professional Baseball League (CPBL) for the Fubon Guardians and Rakuten Monkeys.

== Career ==
=== Boston Red Sox ===
The Boston Red Sox selected Kent in the 13th round of the 2015 MLB draft out of Texas A&M University, where he pitched for the Texas Aggies and improved gradually each season. In 2015, he went 9–1 with a 2.76 earned run average in 98 innings pitched, leading the team in innings and K/BB ratio (7.0), while posting the lowest ERA of any A&M pitcher to collect at least 55 innings. Likewise, Kent played three collegiate summers with the Rochester Honkers of the Northwoods League. In the 2015 season, he was named Northwoods League co-pitcher of the year and ranked fourth on the league's top 200 prospects, after going 3–3 with a 2.09 ERA and 69 strikeouts in 77 2/3 innings.

Kent uses a three-quarters arm slot and has a repeatable delivery, and even though his fastball is clocked consistently at 84–88 mph, he attacks the strike zone efficiently to produce swing and miss offerings. His fastball is followed by a slider at 78–82 mph, as well as a solid changeup with fade at 76–80 mph.

The left-hander made a promising debut with the Low–A Lowell Spinners in 2015, as he went 7–1 with a 1.86 ERA and one save in 14 long relief appearances, striking out 35 and giving up 10 walks in 48 1/3 innings of work.

Kent earned a promotion to the Single–A Greenville Drive in 2016, where he settled into a starter's role for the rest of the year. As a result, Kent allowed a 1.50 ERA with a 1.08 WHIP in over two starts and 12 innings for Greenville before joining the High–A Salem Red Sox a few days later. At Salem, Kent tossed 156 innings, going 10–7 with a 3.69 ERA and striking out 120 against 33 walks. He also produced quality starts in 22 of his 26 assignments, including a complete game and the most innings pitched in the Carolina League. After that, he started the decisive Game 3 for Salem in the Carolina League South Division Championship Series, which was won by the Myrtle Beach Pelicans, 2–1. Kent, who did not factor in the decision, was dominant in 6 2/3 scoreless innings for the Sox, scattering four hits while not walking a batter and striking out five. Overall, Kent compiled a record of 10–7 with a 3.54 ERA in 28 starts, striking out 125 batters while walking 37 in 168 innings. Moreover, he led all Red Sox minor league pitchers in starts, innings, and least home runs allowed (4), while ending fourth in wins, ERA and strikeouts.

Kent spent the 2017 season with Salem, appearing in 28 games (all starts) while compiling a 7–7 record with 4.23 ERA, 142 strikeouts, and 38 walks in 164 innings pitched. Kent started the 2018 season with the Double-A Portland Sea Dogs. He was sent to the Triple-A Pawtucket Red Sox for one start in late July, a no decision, and then returned to Portland. Overall during 2018 with both teams, Kent appeared in 28 games (24 starts) while compiling an 11–8 record with a 3.69 ERA.

Kent started the 2019 season with Portland, and spent three stints with Pawtucket (most of May, three days in early June, and one day in mid-July). Overall with both teams in 2019, Kent appeared in 28 games (24 starts), recording 99 strikeouts in 152 1/3 innings with a 5.08 ERA and a 6–11 record. He did not in a game in 2020, due to cancellation of the minor league season because of the COVID-19 pandemic. Kent began the 2021 season in Double-A with Portland, and spent part of July in Triple-A with the Worcester Red Sox. Overall with both teams, Kent made 27 appearances (three starts), compiling a 7–3 record with 3.73 ERA while striking out 57 batters in 72 1/3 innings pitched. He elected minor league free agency following the season on November 7, 2021.

=== Miami Marlins ===
On December 3, 2021, Kent signed a minor league contract with the Miami Marlins organization. Kent made 28 appearances (25 starts) for the Triple-A Jacksonville Jumbo Shrimp in 2022, posting a 9-11 record and 4.99 ERA with 80 strikeouts in 144 1/3innings pitched. He became a free agent following the season on November 10, 2022.

=== Fubon Guardians ===
On January 27, 2023, Kent signed with the Fubon Guardians of the Chinese Professional Baseball League (CPBL). In 25 games (24 starts) for Fubon, Kent compiled a 5–12 record and 3.23 ERA with 69 strikeouts across 150 1/3 innings pitched.

=== Rakuten Monkeys ===
On June 2, 2024, Kent signed with the Rakuten Monkeys of the Chinese Professional Baseball League.
