= Drama (Jamelia album) =

Studio album by Jamelia
- Released: 26 June 2000
- Genre: R&B
- Length: 60:34
- Label: Parlophone

Jamelia chronology
| Drama (2000) | Thank You (2003) |

Singles from Drama
- 1. "I Do" Released: 19 July 1999; 2. "Money" Released: 21 February 2000; 3. "Call Me" Released: 5 June 2000; 4. "Boy Next Door" Released: 2 October 2000

Drama is the debut studio album by English singer-songwriter Jamelia. It was released by Parlophone Records on 26 June 2000. The album was well-received, with critics praising Jamelia's vocal talent, songwriting range, and potential for future growth. Commercially, Drama peaked at number 39 on the UK Albums Chart and number 12 on the UK R&B Albums Chart. It produced four singles, including lead single "I Do", the top five hit "Money", and two further singles, "Call Me" and "Boy Next Door."

== Background ==
At just 15 years old, Jamelia secured a deal with Capitol Records after record producers were impressed by her a cappella demos—songs she had written and recorded herself using a karaoke machine. In late 1999, she released the track "So High", a duet with R&B singer Rosita Lynch. However, the single failed to chart in the United Kingdom or across Europe and was not included on any of Jamelia's later albums. Due to the underwhelming performance of the release, she parted ways with Capitol Records but was soon signed by Parlophone, a division of EMI.

== Promotion ==
Parlophone issued "I Do" as her debut with the company. Serving as the lead single off Jamelia's debut album Drama, the song became her first top 40 hit in the UK, peaking at number 36 on the UK Singles Chart. Promotional copies of the song "Thinking 'Bout You" were released near the end of the year. In 2000, Jamelia released the second single off the album, "Money," featuring Jamaican artist Beenie Man. The song reached the top five of the UK Singles Chart and spent eleven weeks there. It received a nomination for Best British Video at the 2001 BRIT Awards. Later on that year, two further singles, "Call Me" and "Boy Next Door" were released from the album. They peaked at number 11 and number 42 on the UK Singles Chart, respectively.

== Critical reception ==
Professional ratings
Review scores
| Source | Rating |
|---|---|
| The Encyclopedia of Popular Music | 3/5 stars |
| The Independent | 3/5 stars |
| NME | 3/5 stars |
| Q | 3/5 stars |

Drama earned generally positive reviews from music critics. The Guardian wrote that Drama "proves that the British are capable of making R&B that is soulful, sophisticated and mesmerising." Tim Perry from The Independent concluded: "Demonstrating a deft writing skill that rounds up soul, pop, ragga, medieval vibes and hip-hop, her first album is more a statement of future intent, but it's still pretty awesome." Lucy O'Brien, writing for Q, called Drama an "impressive debut album." She found that "despite her youth and relative inexperience, 19-year-old Jamelia curls her voice around the beat with astonishing authority." NME noted that "while there are a few less-inspired moments on this album, it'a highly impressive debut. One of the best things about Drama is that you know she’s capable of even better than this."

== Commercial performance ==
In the United Kingdom, Drama was released on 26 June 2000. It opened and peaked at number 39 on the UK Albums Chart. The album also reached number 12 on the UK R&B Albums Chart. A potential release of Drama in the United States was planned for early 2001. However, it never came to fruition.

== Track listing ==
Drama track listing
| No. | Title | Writer(s) | Producer(s) | Length |
|---|---|---|---|---|
| 1. | "One" | Jamelia Davis; Jonuz | Jonuz | 3:54 |
| 2. | "Money" (featuring Beenie Man) | Colin Emmanuel; Daniel de Bourg; Davis; James Yarde; Moses Davis | Emmanuel | 6:20 |
| 3. | "Call Me" | Davis | Emmanuel | 4:20 |
| 4. | "Not With You" | Emmanuel; Davis; Rupert Gayle | Emmanuel | 3:49 |
| 5. | "Boy Next Door" | Davis; Rory Bennett; Tina Harris | Bennett | 3:40 |
| 6. | "One Day" | Emmanuel; de Bourg; Davis | Emmanuel | 5:28 |
| 7. | "Ghetto" | Alex Nesmith; Andrew Lane; Davis | Nesmith | 4:42 |
| 8. | "Thinking 'Bout You" | Ivor Reid; Davis; Jon Beckford; Mark Reid; Michelle Escoffery | Emmanuel | 4:54 |
| 9. | "I Do" | Emmanuel; de Bourg; Davis | Emmanuel | 5:29 |
| 10. | "Room 101" | I. Reid; Davis; Beckford; M. Reid | I. Reid; Beckford; M. Reid | 4:30 |
| 11. | "Guilty" | Barry, Robin & Maurice Gibb | I. Reid; Beckford; M. Reid | 4:06 |
| 12. | "I Can't Be" | Davis; Linslee Campbell; Escoffery | Campbell | 4:23 |
| 13. | "This Time" | I. Reid; Davis; Beckford; M. Reid | I. Reid; Beckford; M. Reid | 5:10 |
| Total length: | | | | 60:34 |

Notes

- "Guilty" is a cover of the 1980 song by Barbra Streisand and Barry Gibb.
- "Thinking 'Bout You" features a rap by Don Juan.

== Charts ==
Weekly chart performance for Drama
| Chart (2000) | Peak position |
|---|---|
| UK Albums (OCC) | 39 |
| UK R&B Albums (OCC) | 12 |
