= Bout (song) =

Single by Jamelia featuring Rah Digga

from the album Thank You
- B-side: "For You"; "Girlfriend"
- Released: 21 February 2003
- Genre: Hip hop
- Length: 4:01 (radio version); 4:26 (album version)
- Label: Parlophone
- Songwriters: Bill Conti; Jamelia Davis; Colin Emmanuel
- Producer: Colin Emmanuel

Jamelia singles chronology
"Boy Next Door" (2000)	"Bout" (2003)	"Superstar" (2003)

"Bout" is a song by English singer Jamelia featuring American rapper Rah Digga. It was written by Jamelia and Colin Emmanuel for her second studio album Thank You (2003), while production was helmed by the latter. The song samples from American composer Bill Conti's record "Gonna Fly Now" (1976), best known as the theme from Rocky. Her first release in three years, it was released by Parlophone Records on 21 February 2003 in the United Kingdom. A minor commercial hit, it peaked at number 37 on the UK Singles Chart.

== Music video ==
A music video for "Bout" was directed by Barnaby Roper.

== Track listing ==
UK CD1
No.	Title	Length
1.	"Bout" (featuring Rah Digga) (Single Edit)
2.	"For You"
3.	"Girlfriend"
4.	"Bout" (video)

UK CD2
No.	Title	Length
1.	"Bout" (featuring Rah Digga) (Single Edit)
2.	"Bout" (featuring Rah Digga) (Delinquent Vocal Mix)
3.	"Bout" (featuring Rah Digga) (Sticky Remix)

== Charts ==
=== Weekly charts ===
Chart (2003)	Peak position
Scottish Singles Sales (Official Charts)	55
UK Singles (Official Charts)	37
UK Hip Hop/R&B (Official Charts)	9

=== Year-end charts ===
Chart (2003)	Position
UK Urban (Music Week)	9
