= Thank You (Jamelia song) =

2004 single by Jamelia

Single by Jamelia

from the album Thank You
- B-side: "Same-ish"; "Club Hoppin" (remix); "Bad"
- Released: 23 February 2004
- Length: 3:13
- Label: Parlophone
- Songwriters: Jamelia Davis; Carsten Schack; Peter Biker
- Producers: Soulshock; Peter Biker

Jamelia singles chronology
"Superstar" (2003)	"Thank You" (2004)	"See It in a Boy's Eyes" (2004)

"Thank You" is a song by English singer Jamelia. It was written by Jamelia, Peter Biker and Carsten "Soulshock" Schack, while production was helmed by the latter two. The song was chosen as the third single taken from Jamelia's second studio album, Thank You (2003). "Thank You" is about an abusive relationship, of which Jamelia had first-hand experience, discussing that relationship and how she made it through the experience.

"Thank You", released in the United Kingdom on 23 February 2004, became Jamelia's highest-charting single in the UK to date, peaking at number two and spending 14 weeks within the UK Singles Chart. It was kept off the top spot by a re-release of Peter Andre's "Mysterious Girl". The song was also successful in Australia, New Zealand, Finland, and Ireland, peaking inside the top 20 in all four countries. In France, the song was released as a duet with French singer Singuila, reaching number 30 on the French Singles Chart.

== Music video ==
Many critics saw the song as a source of strength and inspiration, which is why in the music video, directed by Matthew Rolston, Jamelia is depicted as the four elements. She commented that when thinking of ideas for the music video she wanted to focus on the positive side of the song, not the negative.

== Track listings ==
UK CD1
No.	Title	Length
1.	"Thank You"
2.	"Same-ish"

UK CD2
No.	Title	Length
1.	"Thank You"
2.	"Club Hoppin" (Rishi Rich remix)
3.	"Bad"
4.	"Thank You" (enhanced video)

UK 12-inch single
No.	Title	Length
1.	"Thank You"
2.	"Club Hoppin" (Rishi Rich remix)
3.	"Bad"

Australian CD1
No.	Title	Length
1.	"Thank You"
2.	"Superstar" (Rob 'Reef' Tewlow remix)
3.	"Club Hoppin" (Rishi Rich remix)
4.	"Same-ish"

Australian CD2
No.	Title	Length
1.	"Thank You"
2.	"Superstar"
3.	"Thank You" (Mike 'Spike' Drake remix)
4.	"Superstar" (Rob 'Reef' Tewlow remix)
5.	"Bad"

French CD single
No.	Title	Length
1.	"Thank You" (with Singuila)	4:18
2.	"Thank You" (album version)	3:07

== Personnel ==
Personnel are lifted from the Thank You album booklet.

- Jamelia – writing (as Jamelia Davis)
- Soulshock – writing (as Carsten Schack), all instruments, production, mixing, arrangement
- Peter Biker – writing, all instruments, production, arrangement
- Eric Jackson – guitar

== Charts ==
=== Weekly charts ===
Weekly chart performance for "Thank You"
Chart (2004)	Peak position
Australia (ARIA)	7
Australian Urban (ARIA)	2
Austria (Ö3 Austria Top 40)	43
Belgium (Ultratop 50 Flanders)	37
Belgium (Ultratop 50 Wallonia)	38
Belgium (Ultratop 50 Wallonia) with Singuila	32
Europe (Eurochart Hot 100)	10
Finland (Suomen virallinen lista)	15
France (SNEP) with Singuila	30
Germany (GfK)	46
Ireland (IRMA)	10
Italy (FIMI)	29
Netherlands (Dutch Top 40)	21
Netherlands (Single Top 100)	28
New Zealand (Recorded Music NZ)	8
Scottish Singles Sales (Official Charts)	3
Switzerland (Schweizer Hitparade)	35
UK Singles (Official Charts)	2
UK Hip Hop/R&B (Official Charts)	1

=== Year-end charts ===
Year-end chart performance for "Thank You"
Chart (2004)	Position
Australia (ARIA)	50
UK Singles (OCC)	24

== Certifications ==
Certifications for "Thank You"
Region	Certification	Certified units/sales
Australia (ARIA)	Gold	35,000^{^}
United Kingdom (BPI)	Silver	200,000^{^}
^{^} Shipments figures based on certification alone.

== Release history ==
Release history and formats for "Thank You"
Region	Date	Format(s)	Label(s)	Ref.
United Kingdom	23 February 2004	12-inch vinyl; CD	Parlophone	
Australia	19 April 2004	CD	Parlophone	
