= Universal Prayer (song) =

Single by Tiziano Ferro and Jamelia

from the album Thank You (international reissue) and Unity: The Official Athens 2004 Olympic Games Album
- Released: 2 August 2004
- Genre: R&B; pop
- Length: 4:07
- Label: Parlophone; EMI
- Songwriters: Jamelia Davis; Tom Nichols; Tiziano Ferro; Mikkel Storleer Eriksen; Tor Erik Hermansen
- Producer: Stargate

Tiziano Ferro singles chronology
"Non me lo so spiegare" (2004)	"Universal Prayer" (2004)	"Stop! Dimentica" (2006)

Jamelia singles chronology
"See It in a Boy's Eyes" (2004)	"Universal Prayer" (2004)	"DJ" / "Stop" (2004)

"Universal Prayer" is a song recorded by Italian singer Tiziano Ferro and English singer Jamelia for the soundtrack to the 2004 Summer Olympic games. It was written by Ferro and Jamelia along with Tom Nichols, Mikkel Storleer Eriksen, and Tor Erik Hermansen, while production was helmed by Eriksen and Hermansen under their production moniker Stargate. Released as a standalone single in August 2004, the song became a number-one hit in Greece, Italy, and Spain. "Universal Prayer" was later added to the re-issue of Jamelia's second studio album Thank You (2003).

== Track listing ==
CD single
No.	Title	Length
1.	"Universal Prayer" (Radio Version)
2.	"Universal Prayer" (Album Version)
3.	"Universal Prayer" (Blacksmith Club Remix)

== Charts ==
Chart (2005)	Peak position
Austria (Ö3 Austria Top 40)	46
Belgium (Ultratip Bubbling Under Wallonia)	11
CIS Airplay (TopHit)	149
Europe (European Hot 100)	59
Germany (GfK)	52
Greece (IFPI)	1
Italy (FIMI)	1
Netherlands (Dutch Top 40 Tipparade)	4
Netherlands (Single Top 100)	69
Switzerland (Schweizer Hitparade)	31
Turkey (Number One Top 20)	99
