= See It in a Boy's Eyes =

2004 single by Jamelia

Single by Jamelia

from the album Thank You
- B-side: "Taxi"; "Numb" (live acoustic)
- Released: 12 July 2004
- Length: 3:40
- Label: Parlophone
- Songwriters: Chris Martin; Jamelia Davis
- Producers: Cameron McVey; Matt Kent

Jamelia singles chronology
"Thank You" (2004)	"See It in a Boy's Eyes" (2004)	"Universal Prayer" (2004)

"See It in a Boy's Eyes" is a song by English singer Jamelia. It was written by Jamelia and Coldplay frontman Chris Martin for the reissue of Jamelia's second studio album, Thank You (2003). Production was helmed by Cameron McVey and Matt Kent. Released in the United Kingdom on 12 July 2004, the song became Jamelia's third consecutive top-five hit in the UK, peaking at number five and spending 11 weeks on the UK Singles Chart. It also peaked at number 11 on the Irish Singles Chart.

== Composition ==
The song was written in the studio by Jamelia and Chris Martin in London at the end of 2003 for Jamelia's second album, Thank You. Martin created a piano loop and wrote the chorus lyrics. Jamelia said the song is "about a relationship where someone doesn't speak about having a problem and you can see that they're upset but they're just not talking".

== Release and chart performance ==
"See It in a Boy's Eyes" was released on 12 July 2004 in the United Kingdom under two CD single formats. The first CD contains "Taxi" from Thank You and the second CD contains the acoustic version of "Thank You" from Jo Whiley's Live Lounge, an acoustic cover of "Numb" by "Linkin Park", and the enhanced music video. The song debuted and peaked at number five on the UK Singles Chart on 24 July 2004. A week later, it slipped to number six and the following week, it fell four places to number 10. It spent 11 weeks on the chart, seven of which were in the top 40, and finished as the 101st-best-selling single of 2004. The song also reached the top 20 in Flanders and on the Hungarian Dance Chart.

== Music video ==
The music video for "See It in a Boy's Eyes" was directed by W.I.Z. It was filmed in Cuba and features Jamelia as a soldier in the army and throughout the video, there are scenes of Jamelia and another soldier who are in love but it is clear that they are upset with each other and they refuse to speak. In an interview with the BBC, Jamelia said "I just wanted it to be different – it would have been so predictable if it was just me in a short skirt, my legs out – and I'm not a predictable person. I was trying to be fresh so that people stay interested in me." The video won the "Best Video Award" at the 2004 MOBO awards.

== Track listings ==
UK CD1 and European CD single
No.	Title	Length
1.	"See It in a Boy's Eyes"
2.	"Taxi"

UK CD2
No.	Title	Length
1.	"See It in a Boy's Eyes"
2.	"Thank You" (Jo Whiley Live Lounge acoustic)
3.	"Numb" (Jo Whiley Live Lounge acoustic)
4.	"See It in a Boy's Eyes" (enhanced video)

UK 7-inch picture disc
No.	Title	Length
1.	"See It in a Boy's Eyes"
2.	"See It in a Boy's Eyes" (JD rework)

Australian CD single
No.	Title	Length
1.	"See It in a Boy's Eyes"
2.	"Thank You" (Jo Whiley Live Lounge acoustic)
3.	"Numb" (Jo Whiley Live Lounge acoustic)
4.	"See It in a Boy's Eyes" (JD rework)

== Credits and personnel ==
Credits are lifted from the Thank You album booklet.

Studio

- Mixed at Astoria Studios (London, England)

Personnel

- Chris Martin – writing
- Jamelia – writing (as Jamelia Davis)
- Cameron McVey – production
- Matt Kent – production
- Jonathan Shakhovskoy – recording engineer
- Steve Fitzmaurice – mixing
- Damon Iddins – mixing assistance

== Charts ==
=== Weekly charts ===
Chart (2004–2005)	Peak position
Australia (ARIA)	35
Australian Urban (ARIA)	8
Belgium (Ultratop 50 Flanders)	36
Belgium (Ultratip Bubbling Under Wallonia)	17
CIS Airplay (TopHit)	200
Hungary (Dance Top 40)	20
Hungary (Editors' Choice Top 40)	28
Ireland (IRMA)	11
Romania (Romanian Top 100)	70
Scotland Singles (OCC)	7
UK Singles (OCC)	5
UK Hip Hop/R&B (OCC)	3

=== Year-end charts ===
Chart (2004)	Position
UK Singles (OCC)	101

== Release history ==
Region	Date	Format	Label	Ref.
United Kingdom	12 July 2004	CD	Parlophone	
Australia	9 August 2004	CD	Parlophone	
