= Superstar (Christine Milton song) =

2003 single by Christine Milton

Single by Christine Milton

from the album Friday
- Released: 13 January 2003
- Studio: C&J (Copenhagen, Denmark)
- Genre: R&B
- Length: 3:33
- Label: RCA; BMG Denmark; Metronome
- Songwriters: Mich Hansen; Joe Belmaati; Remee
- Producers: Cutfather & Joe

Christine Milton singles chronology
"Superstar" (2003)	"Whiketywhack (I Ain't Coming Back)" (2003)

"Superstar" is a song written by Mich Hansen, Joe Belmaati, and Remee and performed by Danish pop singer Christine Milton. It was released in January 2003 as the lead single from Milton's debut studio album, Friday (2004), and spent seven weeks at number one on the Danish Singles Chart. The song was later covered to international success by British singer Jamelia.

== Background and writing ==
According to a HitQuarters interview with co-writer and producer Cutfather, the song was initially inspired by Liberty X's "Just a Little" (2002), "I liked that song and wanted to do something, not similar, but something in that vibe", he said. Originally written for Swedish singer Robyn, Cutfather also considered giving the song to Australian singer Kylie Minogue.

== Track listings ==
- CD single
1. "Superstar" – 3:34
2. "Superstar" (Mestarr radio edit) – 3:38
- Maxi-CD single and download single
1. "Superstar" – 3:33
2. "Superstar" (Mestarr radio edit) – 3:36
3. "Superstar" (Mestarr club mix) – 6:55
4. "Superstar" (instrumental) – 3:33

== Personnel ==
Personnel are lifted from the CD single liner notes.

- Mich Hansen – writing
- Joe Belmaati – writing
- Remee – writing, co-production
- Cutfather & Joe – production

== Charts ==
Chart (2003–2004)	Peak position
Denmark (Tracklisten)	1
Norway (VG-lista)	15

== Certifications ==
Region	Certification	Certified units/sales
Denmark (IFPI Danmark)	Platinum	8,000^{^}
^{^} Shipments figures based on certification alone.

== Jamelia version ==
"Superstar"

Single by Jamelia

from the album Thank You
- B-side: "Ayo Superstar" (remix); "Bounce" (remix)
- Released: 15 September 2003
- Studio: Cutfather & Joe (Copenhagen, Denmark)
- Genre: R&B
- Length: 3:35
- Label: Parlophone
- Songwriters: Remee; Mich Hansen; Joe Belmaati
- Producers: Cutfather & Joe

Jamelia singles chronology
"Bout" (2003)	"Superstar" (2003)	"Thank You" (2004)

"Superstar" was covered by British R&B singer Jamelia for her second studio album, Thank You. It was released as the album's second single on 15 September 2003 through Parlophone. The song entered the UK Singles Chart at number eight, but as airplay, video play and the general awareness of the track increased, the track climbed to a peak of number three the following month. "Superstar" became the UK's 26th-biggest-selling single of 2003 and has sold 400,000 copies there as of 2019. The single has been certified platinum by the British Phonographic Industry (BPI), spending 20 weeks on the UK chart.

"Superstar" also saw worldwide chart success, peaking at number one in Australia, the Czech Republic, New Zealand and Poland, as well as attaining top-10 positions in 13 other countries. The song earned the songwriters an Ivor Novello Award for "Most Performed Work", being the most performed song in the United Kingdom in 2003. According to the Performing Right Society, "Superstar" was the fourth most popular song of the 2000s (decade) in the UK based on the amount of plays and performances.

=== Music video ===
The music video for "Superstar" was directed by Dominic Leung. It was shot in Birmingham.

=== Track listings ===
- UK CD1
1. "Superstar" (original version)
2. "Superstar" (Rob "Reef" Tewlow remix)
3. "Ayo Superstar" (JD remix)
4. "Superstar" (enhanced video)
- UK CD2 and European CD single
1. "Superstar" (original version)
2. "Bounce" (Mizchif Makaz mix)
- UK 12-inch single

A1. "Ayo Superstar" (JD remix)
A2. "Superstar" (original mix)
B1. "Superstar" (Rob "Reef" Tewlow remix)
B2. "Superstar" (Copenhaniacs remix)

- Australasian CD single
1. "Superstar" – 3:34
2. "Ayo Superstar" – 3:51
3. "Superstar" (Copenhaniacs remix) – 4:12
4. "Superstar" (enhanced video)

=== Credits and personnel ===
Credits are lifted from the Thank You album booklet.

Studios

- Recorded at Cutfather & Joe Studios (Copenhagen, Denmark)
- Mixed at White Room (Copenhagen, Denmark)

Personnel

- Remee – writing, rap
- Mich Hansen – writing, percussion
- Joe Belmaati – writing, guitar, keys, programming, recording
- Cutfather & Joe – production, mixing
- Mads Nilsson – mixing

=== Charts ===
==== Weekly charts ====
Chart (2003–2004)	Peak position
Australia (ARIA)	1
Australian Urban (ARIA)	1
Austria (Ö3 Austria Top 40)	3
Belgium (Ultratop 50 Flanders)	7
Belgium (Ultratop 50 Wallonia)	6
Czech Republic (IFPI)	1
Europe (Eurochart Hot 100)	2
Finland (Suomen virallinen lista)	9
France (SNEP)	3
Germany (GfK)	4
Greece (IFPI)	6
Hungary (Rádiós Top 40)	11
Hungary (Dance Top 40)	5
Hungary (Single Top 40)	8
Ireland (IRMA)	19
Italy (FIMI)	5
Netherlands (Dutch Top 40)	3
Netherlands (Single Top 100)	5
New Zealand (Recorded Music NZ)	1
Norway (VG-lista)	9
Poland (Polish Airplay Chart)	1
Romania (Romanian Top 100)	12
Scottish Singles Sales (Official Charts)	4
South Korea (Hanteo)	6
Spain (Promusicae)	14
Sweden (Sverigetopplistan)	8
Switzerland (Schweizer Hitparade)	2
UK Singles (Official Charts)	3
UK Hip Hop/R&B (Official Charts)	2

==== Year-end charts ====
Chart (2003)	Position
UK Singles (OCC)	26

Chart (2004)	Position
Australia (ARIA)	6
Australian Urban (ARIA)	2
Austria (Ö3 Austria Top 40)	17
Belgium (Ultratop 50 Flanders)	20
Belgium (Ultratop 50 Wallonia)	30
France (SNEP)	20
Germany (Media Control GfK)	23
Hungary (Rádiós Top 40)	39
Italy (FIMI)	9
Netherlands (Dutch Top 40)	5
Netherlands (Single Top 100)	16
New Zealand (RIANZ)	5
Sweden (Hitlistan)	56
Switzerland (Schweizer Hitparade)	6

=== Certifications ===
Region	Certification	Certified units/sales
Australia (ARIA)	Platinum	70,000^{^}
Belgium (BRMA)	Gold	25,000^{*}
France (SNEP)	Gold	250,000^{*}
Germany (BVMI)	Gold	150,000^{^}
New Zealand (RMNZ)	Platinum	10,000^{*}
United Kingdom (BPI)	Platinum	600,000^{‡}
^{*} Sales figures based on certification alone.^{^} Shipments figures based on certification alone.^{‡} Sales+streaming figures based on certification alone.

=== Release history ===
Region	Date	Format(s)	Label(s)	Ref.
United Kingdom	15 September 2003	12-inch vinyl; CD; DVD	Parlophone	
Australia	12 January 2004	CD	Parlophone	

== Other versions ==
In 2004, Israeli singer Roni Duani released a Hebrew version of the song as a single from her debut album Olam Shalem Bachutz.

In January 2017, Polish Mandee and Maria Mathea released a new version of the song.

In March 2020, a cover of the song was released by British girl group Four of Diamonds and Dutch DJ/producer Joe Stone.
