= Jamelia =

British singer, actress and television presenter (born 1981)

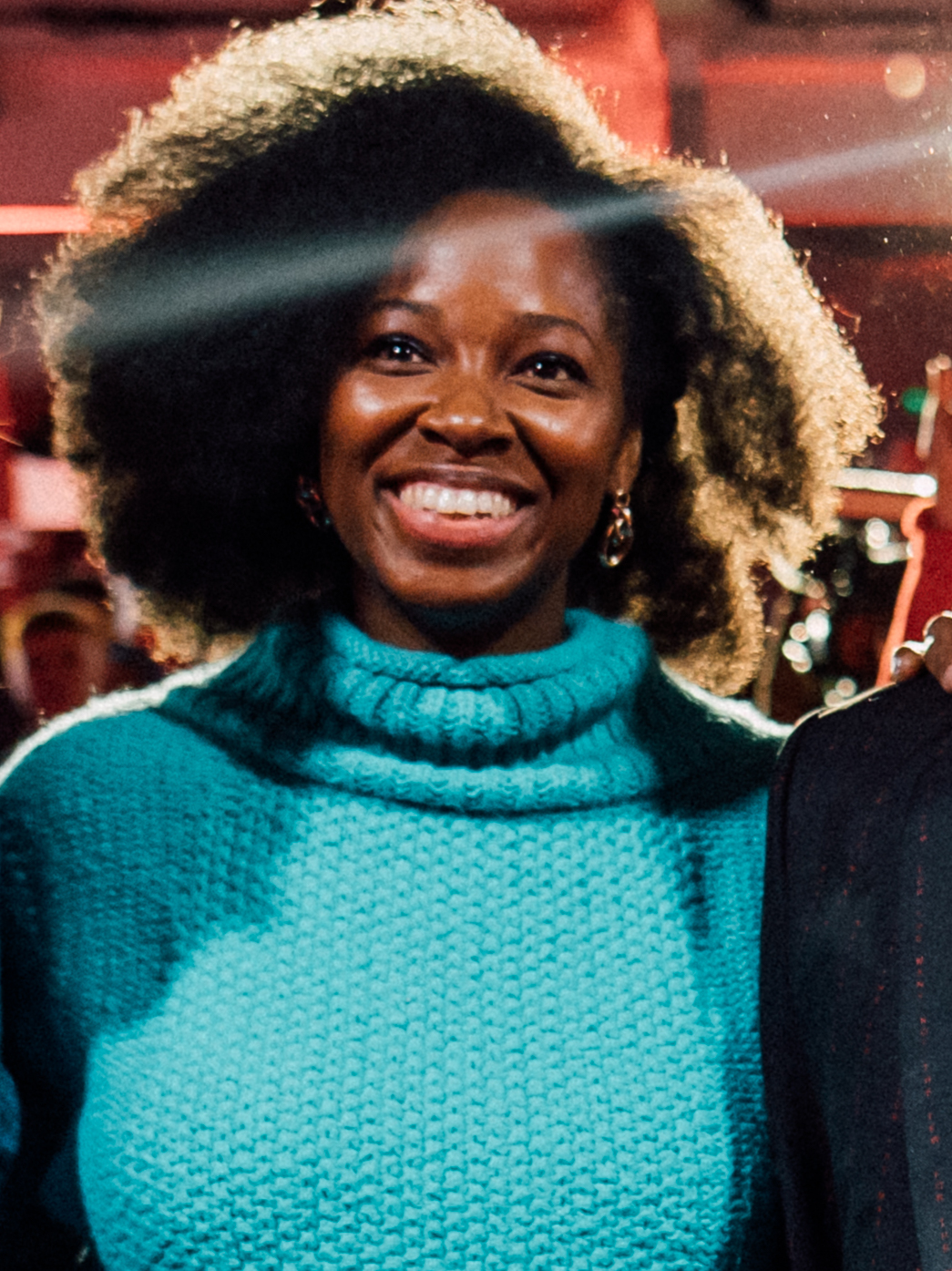
- Jamelia in 2019
- Born: Jamelia Niela Davis; 11 January 1981 (age 45); Handsworth, Birmingham, England
- Occupations: Singer; songwriter; actress; television presenter
- Years active: 1999–present
- Spouse: Darren Byfield (m. 2008; div. 2009)
- Children: 4
- Musical career
- Genres: R&B; pop; hip hop
- Labels: Capitol; Parlophone; All Around the World; Universal
- Website: jamelia.com

Jamelia Niela Davis (born 11 January 1981) is a British singer, actress and television personality. Her three studio albums each peaked inside the Top 40 and they spawned eight top-10 singles. In addition, Jamelia has won four MOBO Awards, a Q Award and has received nine BRIT Award nominations.

Jamelia's professional music career began in 1999, when she released her debut single, "So High", followed by a more successful single, "I Do". She then released her debut full-length studio album, Drama, in June 2000. Jamelia went on to release further successful singles, including "Superstar" which charted at number three on the UK Singles Chart and number one in Australia, where it became platinum certified. She went on to release the albums Thank You (2003) and Walk with Me (2006), before leaving her label Parlophone.

Jamelia appeared as a judge on Move Like Michael Jackson in 2009. Her filmography includes her own television documentaries, such as Jamelia: Whose Hair Is It Anyway (2008), her own edition of the popular Channel 4 show, The House That Made Me and, in 2011, BBC Three documentary Jamelia: Shame About Single Mums. In 2010, Jamelia signed a new record deal with All Around the World Productions.

Jamelia was a panellist on the ITV magazine show Loose Women from 2013 to 2016.

== Early life ==
Jamelia was born in Handsworth, Birmingham, to single mother Paulette Davis. Both her parents are Jamaican; her father is from Spanish Town and her mother is from Westmoreland. She grew up in nearby Hockley. She attended the local Brookfields Primary School and then the City Technology College, now the CTC Kingshurst Academy.

== Career ==
=== 1999–2001: Early career and Drama ===
Jamelia was signed to Capitol Records at 15 after record producers heard recordings of her self-written a cappella songs that she had made on a karaoke machine. In late 1999, Jamelia recorded the single "So High", a collaboration with fellow R&B vocalist Rosita Lynch. The single failed to chart in both the UK and mainland Europe, and did not appear on any of Jamelia's subsequent albums. Following the poor sales of the single, Jamelia left Capitol Records, but was quickly signed up with record company Parlophone, a branch of EMI.

Taking some time to record her debut studio album, Drama (2000), Jamelia returned to the music scene in 1999 with the single "I Do", which became her first commercially successful single in the UK and mainland Europe, making the UK Top 40 and holding Top 20 positions in France and Sweden. The single's mediocre chart success, however, led to the delay of the release of Money. Jamelia's third single, "Money" (featuring dancehall artist Beenie Man and co-written by UK The X Factor finalist Daniel De Bourg), was released in February 2000. The single was the singer's breakthrough in the UK, peaking at number five and spending nine weeks in the UK Top 75; it later won a MOBO Award for Best Video in 2000. Despite the success of Money, Drama did not make a major chart impression in the UK, where it peaked at number 39. The third single from the album, "Call Me", reached number 11, and the fourth single, "Boy Next Door", peaked at number 42. Recognition for the singer's early success came in late 2000 and 2001 at the BRIT Awards. Jamelia was nominated for Best British Newcomer, Best British Video and Best British Female.

=== 2003–2005: Thank You and mainstream breakthrough ===
Jamelia recorded her second studio album, Thank You, in 2002 and early 2003 following the birth of her daughter Teja in 2001. The first single lifted from Thank You was the R&B-influenced "Bout", on which she collaborated with American rap star Rah Digga; it debuted at number 37 in the UK. The second single, the much poppier "Superstar", became Jamelia's highest peaking at the time when it peaked at number three, and earned the spot of the 26th best-selling of 2003 in the UK. It remains Jamelia's only single to receive a BPI certification. Parent album Thank You, released shortly after "Superstar", was widely expected to replicate the single's success, but entered the UK chart at number 65. Subsequently, a number of record producers worked with Jamelia on a re-release of the album that featured new artwork and track listing, including two new songs: her collaboration with Coldplay's Chris Martin and DJ K Staveley, "See It in a Boy's Eyes", and "DJ".

Promoting the re-release, title track "Thank You" was issued shortly before. Known to be Jamelia's favourite of her releases, the song became her highest-charting single to date in the UK, where it peaked at number two and received the 2004 MOBO Award for Best Single and a BRIT Award nomination in the same category. The fourth single "See it in a Boy's Eyes" was released in mid-2004 and became Jamelia's third consecutive top five hit, winning a MOBO Award for Best Video and a Q Award for Best Single. The success of Thank You resulted in five BRIT Award nominations for Jamelia in 2004 and 2005 for Best British Female, Best British Single, Best Female Solo Act, and Best British Urban Act. The album became the 36th best-selling of 2004 and was certified double platinum by the BPI in recognition of 600,000 copies shipped to retailers. Jamelia also contributed a cover version of Kool and the Gang's "Straight Ahead" for their remix/covers album The Hits: Reloaded.

In mid-2004, Jamelia collaborated with Italian singer Tiziano Ferro on "Universal Prayer" for the 2004 Olympic Games soundtrack. It became her first Number 1 single in Italy and Spain and was added to non-UK editions of Thank You. In late 2004, Jamelia was asked to contribute to the Band Aid 20 charity single "Do They Know It's Christmas?", on which she sang with Will Young. The single topped the UK Singles Chart and was certified platinum. Around the same time, Jamelia released the lead single from the soundtrack of the film Bridget Jones: The Edge of Reason, a cover of Sam Brown's 1988 single "Stop!"; it was released as double A-side in the UK with the aforementioned "DJ", and peaked at number nine.

On 9 November 2006, Jamelia joined Feeder on stage for the encore of Feeder's WAR Child gig at 'The Coronet' in London. They performed a cover of REM's "Everybody Hurts" as well as "Beware of the Dog".

=== 2005–2010: Walk with Me and departure from Parlophone ===
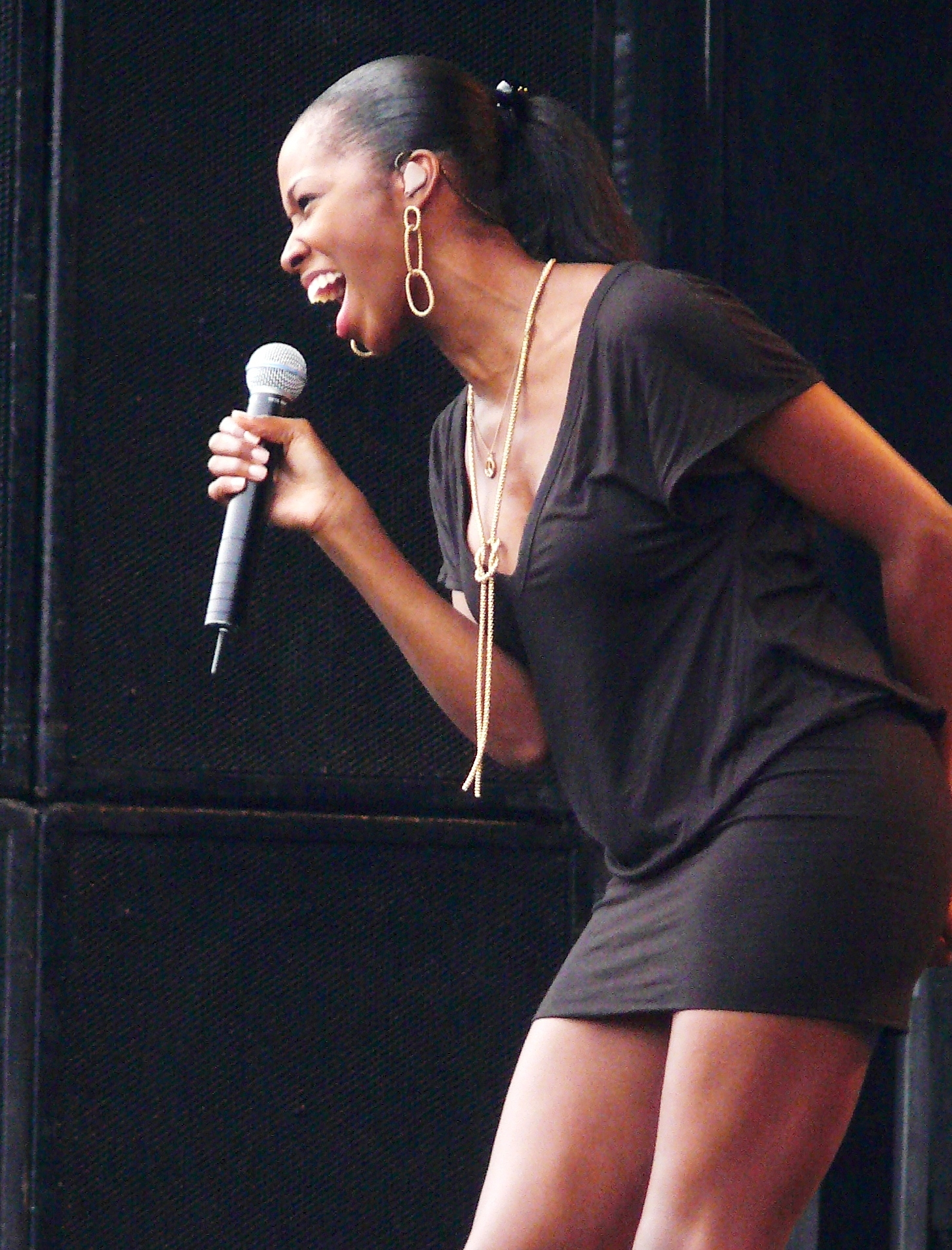
Jamelia in 2007.

Following the birth of her second daughter, Tiani, in 2005, Jamelia began recording her third album, Walk with Me. Its lead single, "Something About You", was released in late 2006 and described as "less R&B, more experimental", with Popjustice hailing it as "an incredible pop single". The single became Jamelia's first to enter the charts solely on download sales alone, debuting at number 28, rising to number nine almost a month later following the physical release. Walk with Me was released shortly after and drew critical praise, with many critics claiming that it marked a significant turn in the singer's career as she moved from R&B to pop/rock.

The album did not emulate the chart success of Thank You, managing to début only at number 20 on the UK Albums Chart. The second single, "Beware of the Dog", features a sample from Depeche Mode's 1989 song "Personal Jesus" and was heavily praised as being Jamelia's best single to date, with BBC Radio 1's "Chart Blog" stating that it "might just be one of the best pop songs ever made" and "the best pop song of the year", receiving a five-star rating. The single became the second consecutive Top 10 effort from the singer's third album, reaching number 10 in the UK. The final single to be released from the album was "No More", which samples The Stranglers' 1981 single "Golden Brown". It made the A-list on BBC Radio 2, but failed to garner much sales success, debuting at number 43.

Walk with Me became Jamelia's second album to receive a BPI certification. After four months of release, it sold more than 100,000 copies and was awarded a Gold disk. However, despite producing two Top 10 singles and garnering mostly positive reviews, Walk With Me had disappointing sales compared to her second album, Thank You, which went on to become certified double platinum.

In an interview with Digital Spy in December 2009, Jamelia said that she wasn't surprised that the album did not sell well. "I probably wasn't in the right frame of mind with Walk With Me... I love all the songs individually, but I don't feel it flows very well as an album, which makes it harder to relate to. It sold well over 100,000 copies – but I want double-platinum every time!"

In late 2007, the singer released a singles collection titled Superstar - The Hits. The compilation album features 11 of her 14 releases, omitting the 1999 single "So High", Drama singles "I Do" and "Boy Next Door" and the non-UK 2004 release "Universal Prayer". The collection, which only managed to début at number 55 on the UK Album Charts, was criticised for its hastiness, brevity and lack of new tracks or artwork. This proved to be her final album for Parlophone, which she left weeks after the collection's release amid rumours that the sales performance of Walk With Me had been a factor in the decision of the artist and label to part ways, and to release the singles collection.

In an interview with entertainment website Digital Spy in December 2009, Jamelia commented on being a rumoured replacement for Keisha Buchanan, in the girl-group Sugababes and spoke about work with her ongoing album, which was going "absolutely amazing". She stated that she was working with producers who have previously worked with Lady Gaga and Beyoncé, and that the album returned her sound to 2004's Thank You. She also vowed to come back with a "really exciting" album. On 26 July 2010, Jamelia signed a record deal with an unknown label live on video streaming website Ustream.tv. Ultimately, nothing was released

=== 2013–2020: Presenting and return to acting ===
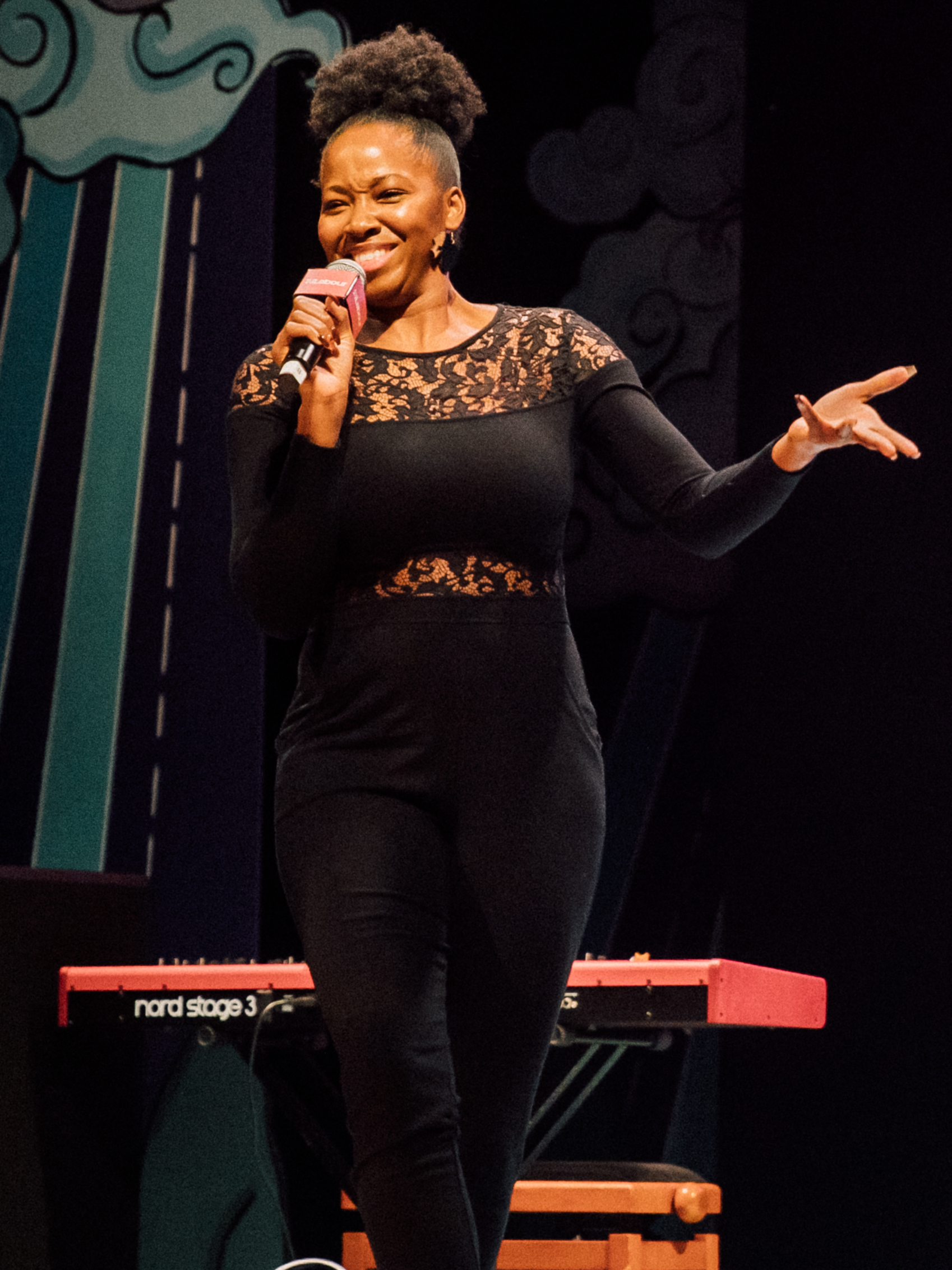
Jamelia in 2019

In 2013 and 2014, Jamelia appeared on two series of The Voice of Ireland as a coach.

In February 2013, Jamelia appeared in an episode of the BBC drama series Death in Paradise, portraying a singer. In 2014, Jamelia modelled a new swimwear range for Boux Avenue. In August 2013, Jamelia was part of a house band on every episode of the BBC One panel show I Love My Country. On 27 November 2013, Jamelia joined the panel of the ITV chat show Loose Women. As of 16 August 2016, she had made 162 appearances. However, she was axed from the show following new contracts being drawn up on 17 August 2016, and did not return for series 21.

In May 2014, she appeared in a TV advertisement for Boux Avenue and sang a cover version of "I Only Want to Be with You", with the chorus changed to "I only want to be with Boux". In 2015, Jamelia took part in Bear Grylls: Mission Survive on ITV. In 2015, Jamelia participated on thirteenth series of Strictly Come Dancing. She was partnered with professional dancer Tristan MacManus. The pair survived four dance-offs, but lost their fifth dance off in week 9, being voted out by 3 out of 4 judges against Peter Andre and Janette Manrara. In 2016, she returned to acting to appear in an episode of the BBC soap opera Doctors as Helena Wales. Following her appearance, she stated that she wants to return to Doctors.

=== 2021-present Hollyoaks, Just Act Normal and The Audacity ===
In 2023, Jamelia joined the cast of Hollyoaks, as Sharon Bailey. She had previously appeared as herself in 2003, and as Bailey for one episode in 2021. In 2024, she appeared on the thirteenth series of the E4 series Celebs Go Dating. In April 2025, BBC comedy drama Just Act Normal aired; Jamelia portrays Jackie.

In 2025 Jamelia confirmed working on a new album. Citing family encouragement, as a reason to return to the studio, Jamelia says her new music will reflect a more "mature perspective" and that she intends to bring “wisdom and life experience” to her new music. In October 2025, Jamelia performed a live acoustic performance at AURA Skypool in Dubai where she debuted two unreleased tracks "Flowers" and "Pieces" from her upcoming album. In an interview with Davina McCall, Jamelia confirmed the album, titled The Audacity, would be released in 2026.

== Other projects ==
In spring 2004, Jamelia was signed by the agency ICM. A week later she was signed as the face and legs of Pretty Polly in a high-profile advertising campaign and shortly afterwards was featured in a poster campaign for Reebok. Since pursuing work in modelling, Jamelia has also endorsed Listerine Softmint Sensation, Jaguar Cars and BMW, was the brand ambassador for the maternity wear line Seraphine, has appeared in print advertising for Oxfam and on the front cover of magazines such as Cosmopolitan, Company, Elle and Harpers & Queen.

In January 2007, Jamelia launched a new fragrance as part of a campaign to increase awareness of HIV and AIDS. Proceeds from the sale of every bottle of The Body Shop's Rougeberry were donated to MTV's Staying Alive Foundation. On 4 March 2007, Jamelia appeared on an episode of Top Gear, where Richard Hammond drove her to Earl's Court Exhibition Centre for a Brit Awards show in his homemade stretch limousine. On 27 May 2007, Jamelia had signed a £100,000 contract to launch a new range of products for Boots. On 31 July 2007, Jamelia, Erin O'Connor and Helena Christensen, had teamed up with hairdressing/hair product company Toni & Guy to promote Model.Me – a hair product created for women with ethnic hair. Jamelia said, "I think it's about time that there was a haircare range specifically designed for ethnic hair available on every high street."

On 18 September 2007, Jamelia co-hosted the MOBO Awards with Shaggy and on 20 September, she was on the catwalk in Naomi Campbell's Fashion for Relief event at the Natural History Museum in London. Jamelia appeared on ITV's Saturday Night Divas to mark the end of Breast Cancer Awareness Month. She shared the stage with Jennifer Lopez, Girls Aloud, Celine Dion and Alicia Keys, amongst others and performed a cover version of Outkast's hit single Hey Ya!. On 1 December 2007, Jamelia was invited to perform on stage for Nelson Mandela's World Aids Day concert. She performed the hit singles "Something About You", "See It in a Boy's Eyes" and "Superstar". On 19 December 2007, she played Cinderella in Channel 4's The Paul O'Grady Show's Christmas Pantomime.

In January 2008, Jamelia signed a book publishing deal with Orion. Her autobiography, Stronger has yet to be published. In February 2008, Jamelia announced in a podcast on her personal website that she had "completed her first official acting role". It was also mentioned that she had landed a TV presenting job. In July 2008 she appeared in a documentary about the international Hair extensions trade Jamelia: Whose Hair is it Anyway? for BBC Three travelling to India and Russia with Tatiana Karelina and guest presented a week of episodes of Big Brother's Big Mouth for E4.

On 7 September 2008, Jamelia guest presented an episode of Something for the Weekend with Tim Lovejoy. A more recent project is The Really Good School Dinner. Jamelia is supporting the initiative which will see children and young people in England pledging to have a school meal and make a donation to provide some of the world's poorest children with a nutritious meal.

Jamelia starred in an episode of Gordon Ramsay's The F Word, where she and Gordon took part in a cook off competition. She was a guest judge for BBC's Let's Dance for Comic Relief, and she has appeared on the Disney channel show Under Cover Coach, in which she coached a girl called Amy in singing. Jamelia presents The National Lottery some Wednesday evenings, which she has been doing since April 2008. Jamelia featured in a Channel 4 documentary series, produced by Nutopia, in 2010, called The House That Made Me, which took her back to her childhood home, and reintroduced her to the people she had known in her youth.

Jamelia has walked the catwalk every year since 2007 for her UK model counterpart, Naomi Campbell, and her Fashion for Relief show. Jamelia is also active in working with ActionAid, Princes Trust and the Food Aid branch of the UN, the World Food programme which has seen her visit Kenya, Uganda and India. In 2008, Jamelia earned the role of appearing alongside Helena Christensen and Erin O'Conor, fronting her own ethnic haircare range 'Model Me', in conjunction with 'Toni and Guy', and was stocked nationwide in Boots stores. 2009 saw Jamelia take on various TV roles including authoring her own documentary for BBC Three on ethical hair extensions, which saw her travel to Russia and India. Plus she was one of the judges on BBC Three's Move Like Michael Jackson. Jamelia has met Nelson Mandela and performed for him for both his 46664 concert in Johannesburg and his 90th birthday celebrations in Hyde Park. In 2012, she took part in the Preston Passion to mark Preston's 2012 Guild. The Preston Passion was a retelling of the Easter story and involved singing, dancing and three dramas, where she sang a cover version of "You Got the Love". She has been a frequent guest on the satirical music panel show Never Mind the Buzzcocks and was a celebrity contestant on Vernon Kay's Gameshow Marathon.

== Personal life ==
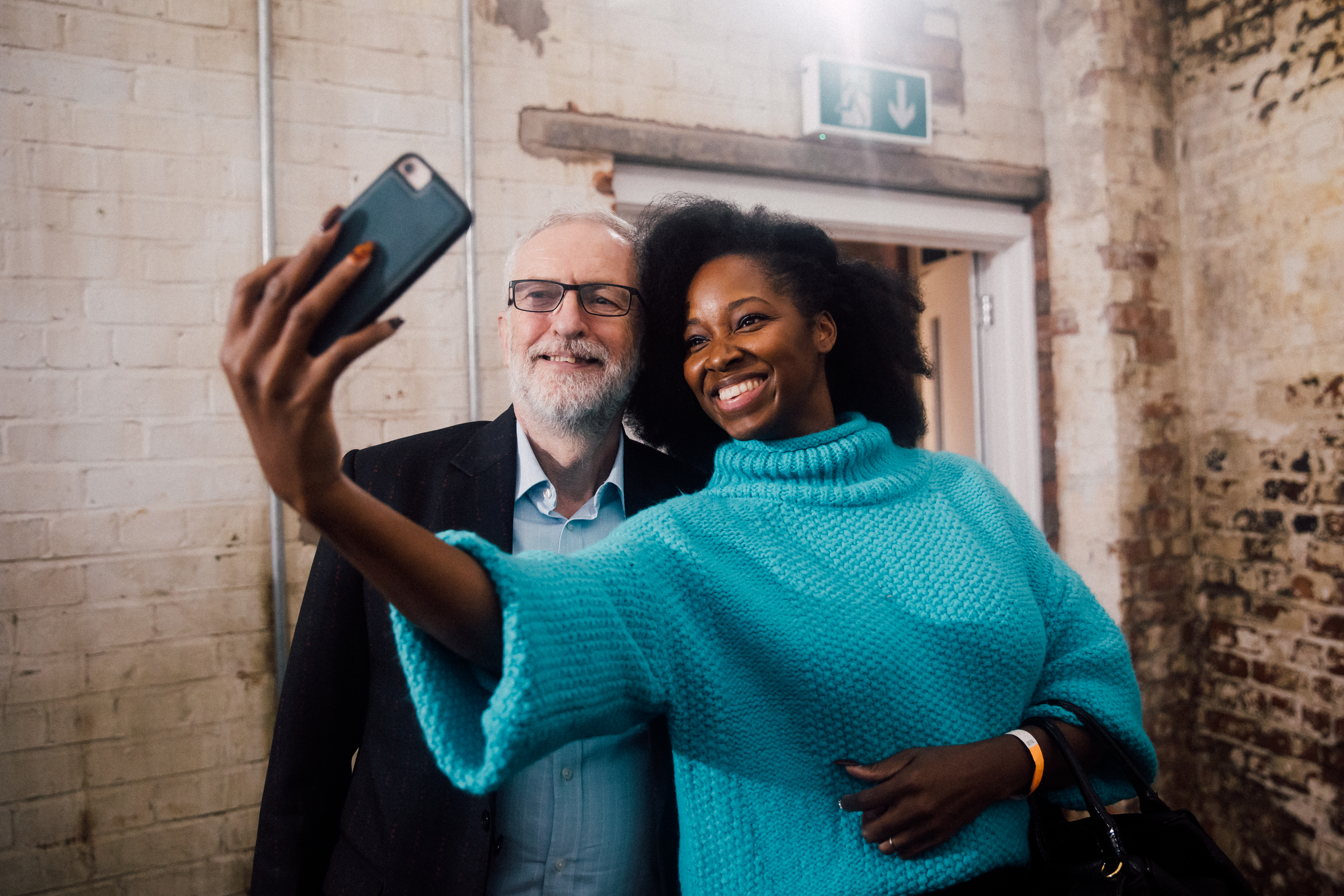
Jamelia taking a selfie with then Labour Party leader Jeremy Corbyn at a 2019 general election campaign rally in Birmingham. Jamelia endorsed Labour in the 2019 general election

Jamelia revealed that she grew up without her father, due to the fact he was often in and out of prison, and he later rejected her invitation to her wedding.

Jamelia has four daughters. Her first was born in 2001, from a relationship with music manager Terry Wallen, who Jamelia claims was abusive and inspired her song "Thank You". In August 2007, Jamelia split from boyfriend Darren Byfield; the couple have a daughter (born 21 October 2005). They were reconciled a couple of months later, and in October 2007 announced their engagement. On 15 June 2008, it was reported the couple had married on the previous day in West Sussex. On 3 November 2009, it was announced that they were filing for divorce. In August 2022, Jamelia announced she was expecting her fourth child.

In March 2024, Jamelia decided to move with her family from Birmingham to Dubai. Among the reasons she listed the desire to live a more balanced life and focusing on her children and opening a new chapter and exploring new opportunities. On a podcast with Kubi Springer, Jamelia mentioned she wanted to change many things in her life and that "I just knew that where I was, the environment in which I was existing, I just knew it’s not going to happen there" adding that "life is a lot more simpler now".

In 2018, Jamelia blamed TV projects being "taken away" from her on the coverage of her stepbrother, Tafarwa Beckford, who was convicted of a gang-related murder.

In November 2019, Jamelia endorsed the Labour Party in the 2019 UK general election.

== Discography ==
Studio albums

- Drama (2000)
- Thank You (2003)
- Walk with Me (2006)
- The Audacity (2026)

== Filmography ==
Year	Title	Role	Notes
2000–2009	Never Mind the Buzzcocks	Herself - Panellist	5 episodes
2003	Hollyoaks	Herself	Episode: "#1.1044"
2007	Gameshow Marathon	Herself - Contestant	Series 2, 6 episodes
2008	Jamelia: Whose Hair Is It Anyway?	Herself - Presenter	TV film documentary
2008–2013	8 Out of 10 Cats	Herself - Panellist	8 episodes
2009	Would I Lie to You?	Herself - Panellist	Episode: "#3.3"
2009	Move Like Michael Jackson	Herself - Judge	4 episodes (as Jamelia Davis)
2009	Let's Dance for Sport Relief	Herself - Judge	Episode: "#1.2"
2011	Jamelia: Shame About Single Mums	Herself - Presenter	TV film documentary
2012	The Diamond Heist	Cherry Valentine	Film (Original title: Magic Boys)
2012	Crime Stories	Alice Dixon	Episode: "#1.17" (as Jamelia Davis)
2012	Celebrity Chase	Herself - Contestant	Series 2, Episode 7: "Text Santa Special"
2013	Big Star's Little Star	Herself - Contestant	Episode: "#1.1"
2013	Death in Paradise	Aimee Fredericks	Series 2, Episode 5: "Death Onboard"
2013	I Love My Country	Herself - House band singer	8 episodes
2013–2014	The Voice of Ireland	Herself - Coach / Judge	Series 2 & 3
2013–2016	Loose Women	Herself - Regular panellist	Series 18–20; 162 episodes
2014	Tipping Point: Lucky Stars	Herself - Contestant	Episode: "#2.7"
2015	All Star Family Fortunes	Herself - Contestant	Episode: "Sam Bailey vs. Jamelia"
2015	Strictly Come Dancing	Herself - Contestant	Series 13, 21 episodes
2015	Bear Grylls: Mission Survive	Herself - Participant	6 episodes
2016	Doctors	Helena Wales	Episode: "Waste of Shame"
2016	The Diary	Detective Inspective Anisa Powell	Short film
2018	Pointless Celebrities	Herself - Contestant	Series 11, Episode: "Christmas Special"
2020	Richard Osman's House of Games	Herself - Contestant	Series 3, 5 episodes
2021, 2023–2024	Hollyoaks	Sharon Bailey	Series regular, 47 episodes
2022	Little Darlings	Kate Williams	Mini-series, 4 episodes
2022	On Tour: Little Darlings	Kate Williams	Mini-series, 2 episodes: "Birthday" and "Lucky Charm"
2022	Little Darlings: Songs	Kate Williams	Mini-series, 2 episodes: "Little Darlings" and "Just a Little"
2022	The Hit List	Herself - Contestant	Series 5, Episode 9: "Celebrity Special" with Lemar
2023	Celebrity Masterchef	Herself - Contestant	Series 18, 6 episodes
2024	Drama Queens	Herself	
2024	Celebs Go Dating	Herself	Cast member; series 13
2025	Just Act Normal	Fake Jackie	

Guest appearances

- Top Gear (2007)
- Loose Women (2007–2011)
- Gok's Fashion Fix (2008)
- The House That Made Me (2010)
- Room 101 (2012)
- The Great Sport Relief Bake Off (2014)
- Celebrity Squares (2014)
- Celebrity Benchmark (2015)
- The Chase Celebrity Special (2016)
- Celebrity Haunted Hotel Live (2016)
- Don't Ask Me Ask Britain (2017)
- Richard Osman's House of Games Night (2020)
- Sorry, I Didn't Know (2022)
- Countdown - Dictionary Corner (February, 2023)

== Awards and nominations ==
Year	Institution	Award
Won
2000	MOBO Awards	Best Video – "Money"
2004	TMF Awards (Belgium)	Meest Belovend
2004	Q Awards	Best Single – "See It in a Boy's Eyes"
2004	MOBO Awards	Best British Female
2004	MOBO Awards	Best Single – "Thank You"
2004	MOBO Awards	Best Video – "See It in a Boy's Eyes"
2005	Urban Music Awards	Best R&B Act
2007	Eska Awards	Best Foreign Singer
2007	Urban Music Awards	Best R&B Act
Nominated
2001	Brit Awards	Best British Video – "Money"
2001	Brit Awards	Best British Female
2004	Brit Awards	Best British Female
2004	Brit Awards	Best British Single – "Superstar"
2004	Mercury Music Prize	Thank You
2004	Smash Hits Poll Winners Party	Best R&B Act
2004	MTV Europe Music Awards	Best New Act
2004	MTV Europe Music Awards	Best UK & Ireland Act
2005	Brit Awards	Best British Female
2005	Brit Awards	Best British Urban Act
2005	Brit Awards	Best British Single – "Thank You"
2005	Ivor Novello Awards	Most Performed Work - "Thank You"
2007	Brit Awards	Best British Female
2005	NRJ Music Awards	International New Artist of the Year
2006	Virgin Media Music Awards	Best Solo Artist
2006	Virgin Media Music Awards	Best Comeback
2006	Virgin Media Music Awards	Most Fanciable Female
2007	Popjustice £20 Music Prize	"Beware of the Dog"
2007	MOBO Awards	Best British Female

== Tours ==
- 2004 Thank You Tour

Jamelia has also been the opening act for artists such as Destiny's Child, Justin Timberlake and Usher as well as her own sold-out tour.

== See also ==
- List of one-word stage names
- List of Strictly Come Dancing contestants
