= Colin Emmanuel =

English music producer

Colin Emmanuel a.k.a. C-Swing is an English music producer, remixer and writer who works across most genres including Hip hop, R&B, Alternative and Soul genres.

He has produced, remixed or written for the likes of; The Beta Band, Jamelia, KRS-One, Beverley Knight, Braintax and Mary J. Blige among others.

== Solo releases ==
- D'illusions of Grandeur was released in January 2006.
