= Soulshock =

- Also known as: Soulpower Productions
- Born: Carsten Schack; 5 July 1968 (age 58); Gug, Denmark
- Origin: Aalborg, Denmark
- Genres: Pop, R&B, hip hop
- Occupations: Singer, songwriter, record producer, musician
- Years active: 1989–present
- Website: www.soulpower.net

Carsten Schack (born 5 July 1968) and better known by his stage name Soulshock is a Danish record producer and songwriter.

== Beginnings ==
Carsten Schack was born in the Aalborg suburb of Gug, the son of economics professor Bent Schack and physician assistant Åse Schack. In the early 1990s he dated choreographer Toniah Pedersen for 3 years. Since 1993 he had been living in Los Angeles in the US with his girlfriend Charmayne Maxwell, former vocalist of American R&B group Brownstone, with whom he has a son, Nicholas.

His music career began as a DJ, when in 1989 he came joint third place in the DMC European Mixing Championships. This gave him a DJ job at Queen Latifah's European tour, and later a remix job for the artist.

In the years 1989–1991 Carsten Schack was co-host of the radio program Det DUR (Dansk Ungdomsradio) on P3. His Monday hip-hop radio show was the first hip-hop program on Radio Denmark.

== Soulshock and Cutfather ==
Together with Mich "Cutfather" Hansen, he formed a producer and DJ duo Soulshock & Cutfather in the late 1980s, making a name by remixing for Danish artists such as Lis Sørensen ("Mine øjne de skal se"), Cut'N'Move ("Get Serious" and "Spread Love"), Laid Back ("Bakerman") and Back to Back ("Jonathan").

In 1990 they together started a record label Soulpower Productions, as part of Medley Records, where they particularly produced Yasmin and Cut'N'Move. Several times they won mixing championship produced for Queen Latifah and Ultra Naté.

== De Serious Cutshock ==
For producing Turkish-Faroese singer Yasmin (full name Yasmin Elvira Steenholdt), he formed a producing trio under the name De Serious Cutshock made up of him (under the pseudonym Soulshock), Mich Hedin Hansen (known as Cutfather) and Peter Meldgaard (known as Depete). The trio produced "Wanna Dance" and "A Scent of Flowers" for her.

== Soulshock and Karlin ==
In 1992, Carsten Schack immigrated to the United States. Soulshock needed a great keyboard player, and found one in Kenneth Karlin. Together they formed the production duo Soulshock & Karlin. Soulshock & Karlin produced and wrote their first No. 1 top 40 hit "Leave (Get Out)" performed by JoJo, and the No. 1 R&B song "Truth Is" performed by American Idol winner Fantasia (which also received a Grammy nomination for best R&B album) and tracks for rap star Nelly.

Throughout the 1990s he wrote and produced, inter alia, Brandy, Usher, Monica, Whitney Houston, Luther Vandross, Craig David, Sting, Toni Braxton, JoJo, and 2Pac.

Soulshock and Karlin have more recently produced songs for the debut solo albums of Cheryl Cole, Alexandra Burke and Leona Lewis.

== Other appearances ==
- In 1992, Schack was in youth program Transit and in a series called Exit.
- In 2010, he was a judge on the Danish X Factor for the third season. He was replaced by Thomas Blachman for the fourth season.

== Personal life ==
Schack was married to Charmayne "Maxee" Maxwell of the group Brownstone, with whom he has a son, Nicolaj. She died on 28 February 2015.

== Discography ==
See: Soulshock & Karlin discography
