= Sam Brown discography =

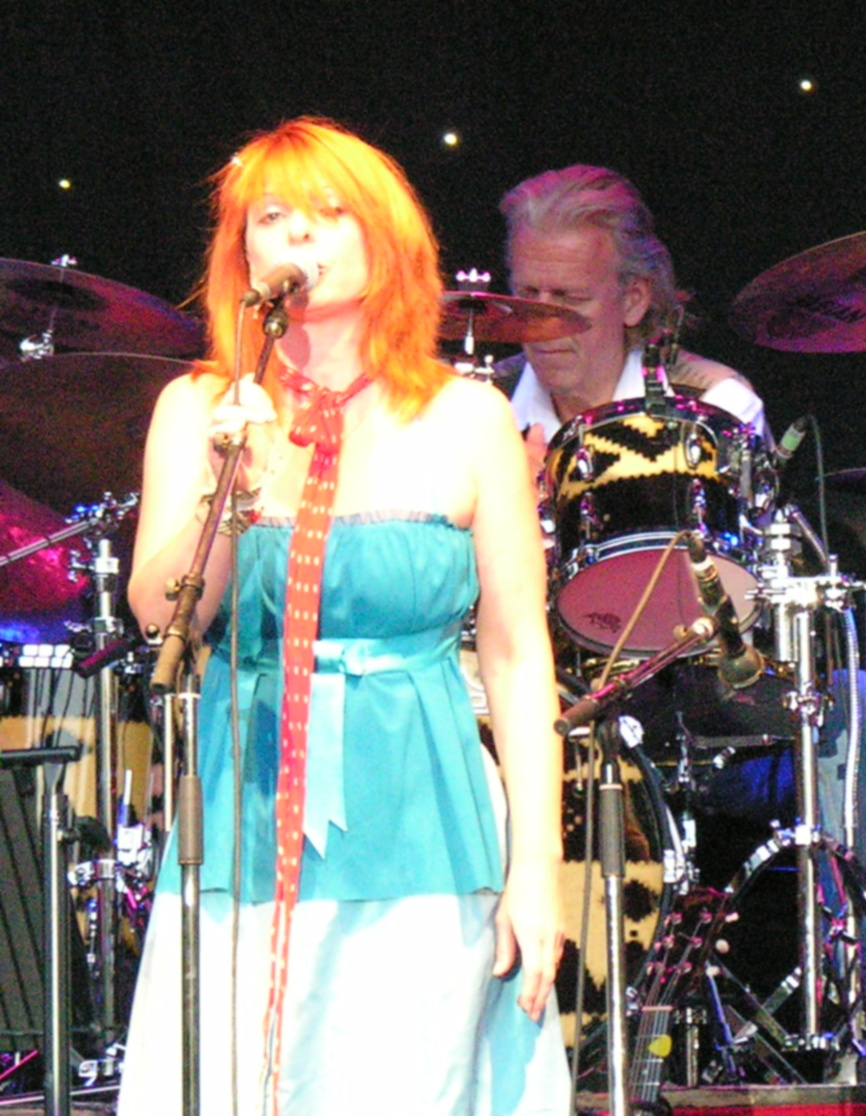
- Brown (with drummer Gilson Lavis) performing live with Jools Holland's Rhythm and Blues Orchestra, in 2006
- Studio albums: 7
- EPs: 1
- Live albums: 1
- Compilation albums: 3
- Singles: 17

Sam Brown has released seven studio albums, one live album, one EP, and three compilation albums.

A curious element of Brown's discography is that her studio and live albums' first letters (ignoring the "43" in 43 Minutes) spell out her name (with "N" being the most recent initial). Brown was unaware of this coincidence until a fan spotted this on the release of ReBoot, after which Brown led an online campaign for fans to name her next album beginning with "O."

== Albums ==
=== Studio albums ===
Year	Title	Peak chart positions										Certifications
Year	Title	UK	AUS	AUT	CAN	GER	NED	NOR	NZ	SWE	SWI	Certifications
1988	Stop!: Released: 8 June 1988; Label: A&M/Festival; Formats: CD, cassette, vinyl	4	13	2	13	13	4	12	4	18	6	UK: Gold; AUS: Gold
1990	April Moon: Released: 27 March 1990; Label: A&M; Formats: CD, cassette, vinyl	38	30	29	—	34	45	—	—	21	20	UK: Silver
1992	43 Minutes...: Released: 1993; Label: Pod Music; Format: CD	—	132	—	—	—	—	—	—	—	—	
1997	Box: Released: 1997; Label: Demon; Format: CD	—	—	—	—	—	—	—	—	—	—	
2000	ReBoot: Released: 2000; Label: Mud Hut; Format: CD	—	—	—	—	—	—	—	—	—	—	
2007	Of the Moment: Released: 22 October 2007; Label: Pod Music; Format: CD	—	—	—	—	—	—	—	—	—	—	
2023	Number 8: Released: 20 January 2023; Label: Pod Music; Format: CD	—	—	—	—	—	—	—	—	—	—	
"—" denotes releases that did not chart.

=== Live albums ===
Year	Title
2021	Wednesday the Something of April: Released: 26 June 2021; Label: Dunmore Ltd.; Format: CD

=== Compilation albums ===
Year	Title
1993	The Kissing Gate: Released: 1993; Label: Karussell
1996	Sam Brown: Released: 1996; Label: A&M
2005	The Very Best of Sam Brown: Released: 2005; Label: Radar/Warner Strategic Marketing

== Extended play ==
Year	Title
2005	Ukulele and Voice: Released: 2005; Label: Nova Sales & Distribution

== Singles ==
Year	Title	Peak chart positions									Album
Year	Title	UK	AUS	BEL (FL)	CAN	GER	IRE	NED	NZ	US	Album
1988	"Walking Back to Me"	—	—	—	—	65	—	—	—	—	Stop!
1988	"Stop!"	52	72	1	—	7	—	2	—	—	Stop!
1988	"This Feeling"	91	115	23	82	—	—	32	—	—	Stop!
1989	"Stop!" (re-release)	4	4	—	13	—	4	—	16	65	Stop!
1989	"Can I Get a Witness"	15	17	—	—	—	15	—	9	—	Stop!
1990	"With a Little Love"	44	27	—	—	52	—	—	—	—	April Moon
1990	"Kissing Gate"	23	89	—	45	—	—	—	—	—	April Moon
1990	"Once in Your Life"	—	125	—	—	—	—	—	—	—	April Moon
1990	"Mindworks"	77	—	—	—	—	—	—	—	—	April Moon
1990	"As One"	—	—	—	—	—	—	—	—	—	April Moon
1991	"Fly Up to the Moon" (Black feat. Sam Brown)	—	—	—	—	—	—	—	—	—	Black (Black album)
1991	"Together Again" (Jools Holland & Sam Brown)	—	—	—	—	—	—	—	—	—	The Full Complement (Jools Holland album)
1993	"Fear of Life"	—	135	—	—	—	—	—	—	—	43 Minutes
1993	"Standing in My Light" (duet with Tom Van Landuyt)	—	—	—	—	—	—	—	—	—	Ad Fundum OST
1995	"Just Good Friends" (Fish feat. Sam Brown)	63	—	—	—	—	—	—	—	—	Yin (Fish album)
1997	"I Forgive You"	—	192	—	—	—	—	—	—	—	Box
2001	"In Light of All That's Gone Before"	—	—	—	—	—	—	—	—	—	Reboot
2004	"Make It Tonight" (Chris Field feat. Sam Brown)	—	—	—	—	—	—	—	—	—	Powis Square (Chris Field album)
"—" denotes releases that did not chart or were not released.
