= Diamond Jubilee Concert =

2012 British music concert

The Diamond Jubilee Concert
- Commemoration concert by various artists
- Logo
- Venue: The Mall, London, England
- Date: 4 June 2012

The Diamond Jubilee Concert was a British music concert and celebration held outside Buckingham Palace on The Mall in London on 4 June 2012. The concert was organised by Take That singer-songwriter Gary Barlow and was part of Queen Elizabeth II's Diamond Jubilee celebrations.

The Diamond Jubilee Concert followed two concerts held at the palace for the Queen's Golden Jubilee a decade earlier – the classical themed Prom at the Palace and the rock/pop themed Party at the Palace, followed by the Platinum Party at the Palace for the Queen's Platinum Jubilee in 2022.

The concert was partially attended by the Queen, who arrived at 9 pm, but not by Prince Philip who had been taken to hospital with a bladder infection earlier in the day. Prince Charles and other members of the royal family attended the whole concert.

== Ticketing ==
Ten thousand free tickets were made available to the public, with applications possible, by post or online, between 7 February and 2 March 2012. After the application period closed, successful applicants were then drawn by random ballot. A total of 1.2 million applications were eventually received, 240 for every available pair. Non-ticketed attendees could watch the concert on giant TV screens in the Mall and local Parks. Estimates of these free attendees range from 250,000 to 500,000 people.

== Date, venue and stage ==
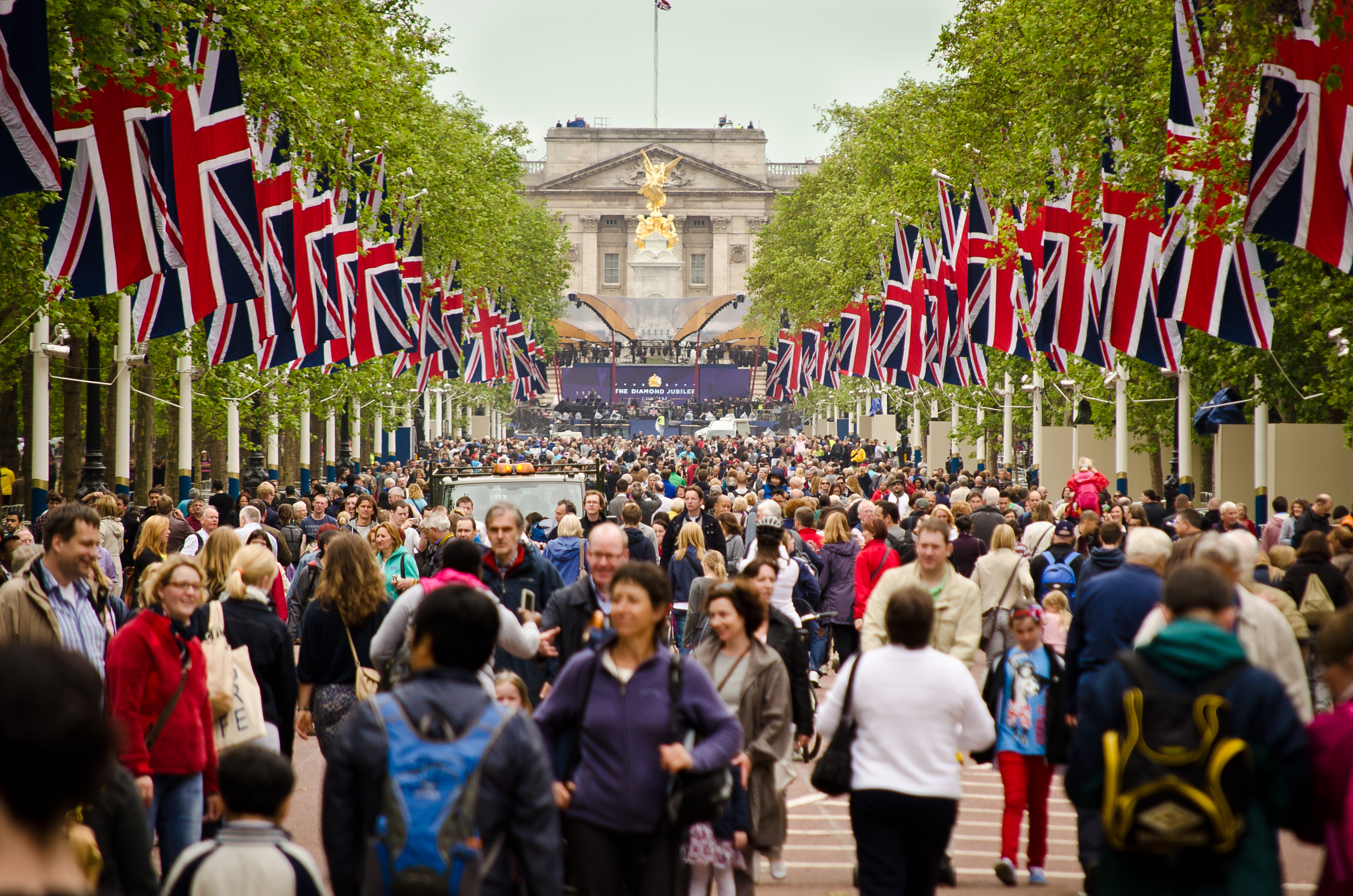
The concert was held at the end of The Mall, directly in front of Buckingham Palace, where a special stage was built.

The concert took place on bank holiday Monday 4 June as part of the extended weekend celebrations for the Diamond Jubilee, which ran from 2 to 5 June. The acts performed on a specially constructed stage, with a canopy, around the Queen Victoria Memorial, in front of the palace. The stage was designed by Mark Fisher.

== House band ==
The house band, led by Mike Stevens, who was also the Musical Director of the concert, consisted largely of the Take That/Gary Barlow band, a few additional musicians and the BBC Concert Orchestra conducted by Keith Lockhart. The house band performed with many of the guest artists that were featured, however Tom Jones, Elton John, Stevie Wonder and Paul McCartney brought their own bands to the concert.

== Diamond Jubilee song ==
Gary Barlow and Andrew Lloyd Webber wrote a song for the jubilee entitled "Sing" which was performed for the first time at the concert by a choir from many Commonwealth countries. The song draws inspiration from the music and people of the Commonwealth. Its creation was the subject of a one-hour BBC documentary broadcast on 3 June 2012 by BBC One.

== Jubilee picnic ==
Concert ticket holders were given access to the palace gardens for an afternoon picnic before the main event. They were served cold hampers with a British themed menu specially designed by Heston Blumenthal and the royal chef Mark Flanagan.

== Performances ==
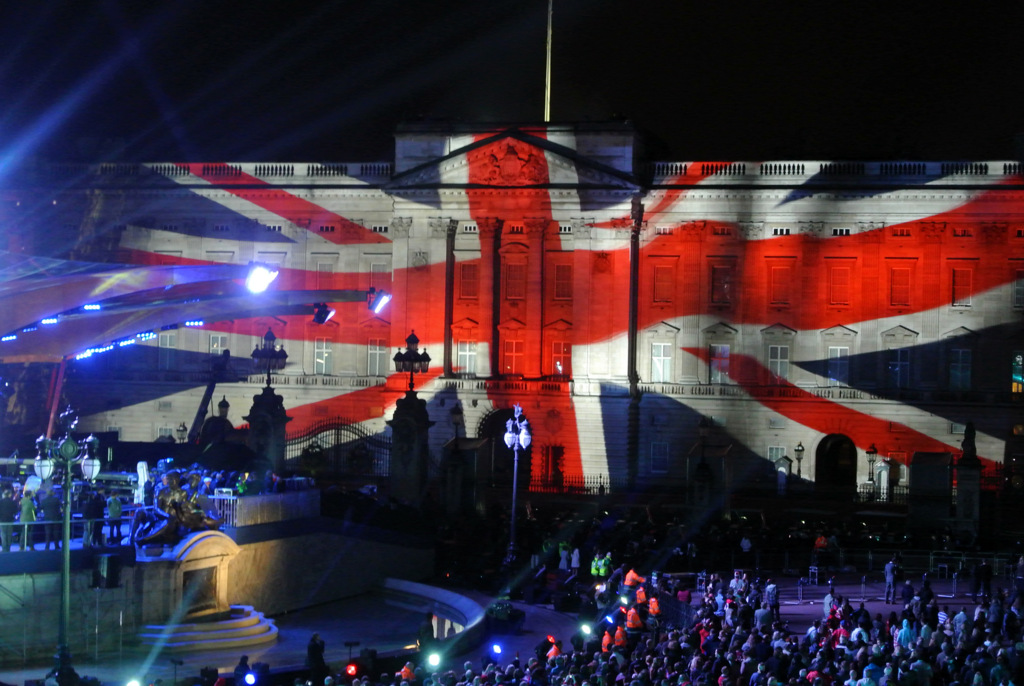
Diamond Jubilee Concert

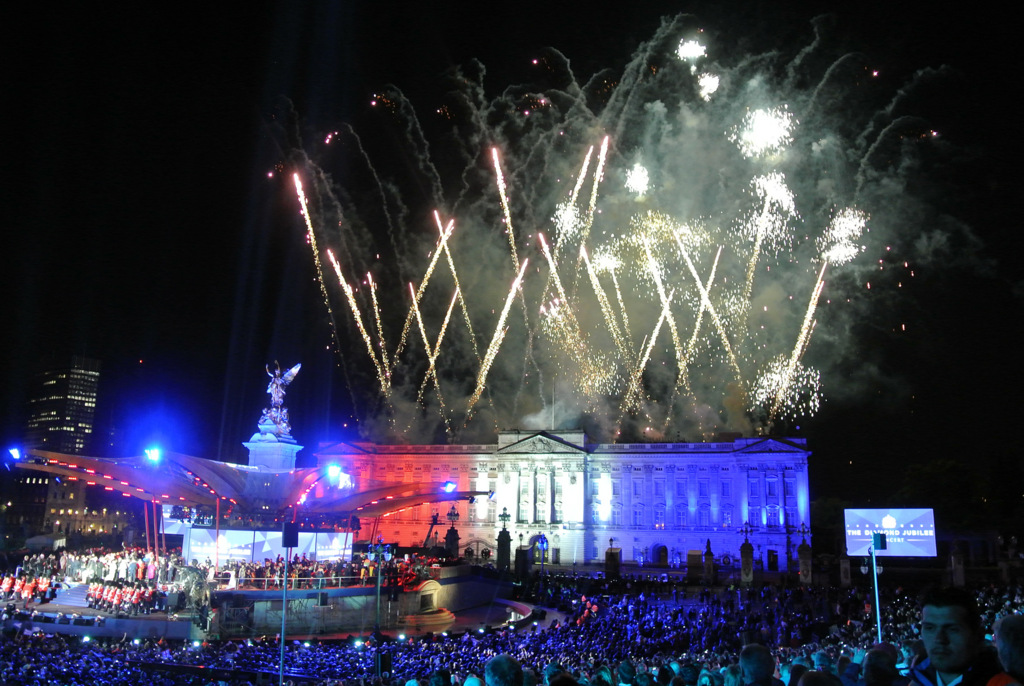
Diamond Jubilee Concert – Fireworks display

The running order was:

- Robbie Williams with drummers and trumpeters from various Household Division bands of the Foot Guards – Let Me Entertain You
- Introduction – Rob Brydon
- will.i.am and Jessie J – I Gotta Feeling / This Is Love
- Jessie J – Domino
- JLS – Everybody in Love / She Makes Me Wanna
- Interlude – Miranda Hart
- Gary Barlow and Cheryl (from Girls Aloud) – Need You Now (cover of Lady A song)
- Interlude – Lee Mack
- Cliff Richard – Medley: Dynamite, The Young Ones, Devil Woman, We Don't Talk Anymore, Wired for Sound and The Millennium Prayer (followed by Congratulations)
- Interlude – Jimmy Carr
- Lang Lang – Hungarian Rhapsody / Rhapsody in Blue
- Interlude – Miranda Hart
- Alfie Boe – O Sole Mio / It's Now or Never
- Interlude – Lenny Henry
- Jools Holland and Ruby Turner – You Are So Beautiful
- Interlude – Jimmy Carr
- Grace Jones – Slave to the Rhythm
- Interlude – Lee Mack and Miranda Hart
- Ed Sheeran – The A Team
- Annie Lennox and Joanne Shaw Taylor – There Must Be An Angel
- Interlude – Rolf Harris
- Renée Fleming – Un Bel Di Vedremo
- Interlude – Rob Brydon
- Tom Jones – Mama Told Me (Not to Come) and Delilah
- Interlude – Lenny Henry. During the interlude, the Queen arrived.
- Robbie Williams – Mack the Knife
- Interlude – Rolf Harris
- Gary Barlow, Andrew Lloyd Webber, The Commonwealth Band, Gareth Malone and the Military Wives – Sing
- Interlude – Rob Brydon organised a forward-moving Mexican wave in the Mall
- Shirley Bassey – Diamonds Are Forever
- Kylie Minogue – Medley: Spinning Around, Can't Get You Out of My Head, Step Back in Time and All the Lovers. Dance troupe Flawless performed during the second half of the number.
- Interlude – Jimmy Carr
- Alfie Boe and Renée Fleming – Somewhere
- Interlude – Rob Brydon
- Elton John – I'm Still Standing, Your Song and Crocodile Rock
- Interlude – Rolf Harris
- A film about the Queen's reign was played, which included her coronation, past jubilees, The Royal Wedding and other events. The film was accompanied by the BBC Concert Orchestra, performing an instrumental arrangement of Beautiful Day.
- Interlude – Lenny Henry (Rolf Harris sang, unaccompanied, a portion of Two Little Boys during the interlude.)
- Stevie Wonder – Sir Duke, Isn't She Lovely (the lyrics were amended to refer to the Queen), Happy Birthday (with will.i.am) and Superstition
- Interlude – Lee Mack
- Madness – Our House and It Must Be Love.
- Interlude – Peter Kay
- Paul McCartney – Magical Mystery Tour, All My Loving, Let It Be, Live and Let Die and Ob-La-Di, Ob-La-Da
- Finish – Prince Charles made a speech
- God Save the Queen (National Anthem)
- Grand Finale – The Queen lit the last National Beacon, after which there was a firework display, during which the melodies of several patriotic songs and hymns were played: Zadok the Priest (Georg Friedrich Händel), I Vow to Thee My Country (Gustav Holst), Land of Hope and Glory (Edward Elgar) and Ode to Joy / Anthem of Europe (Ludwig van Beethoven).

== Broadcasting ==
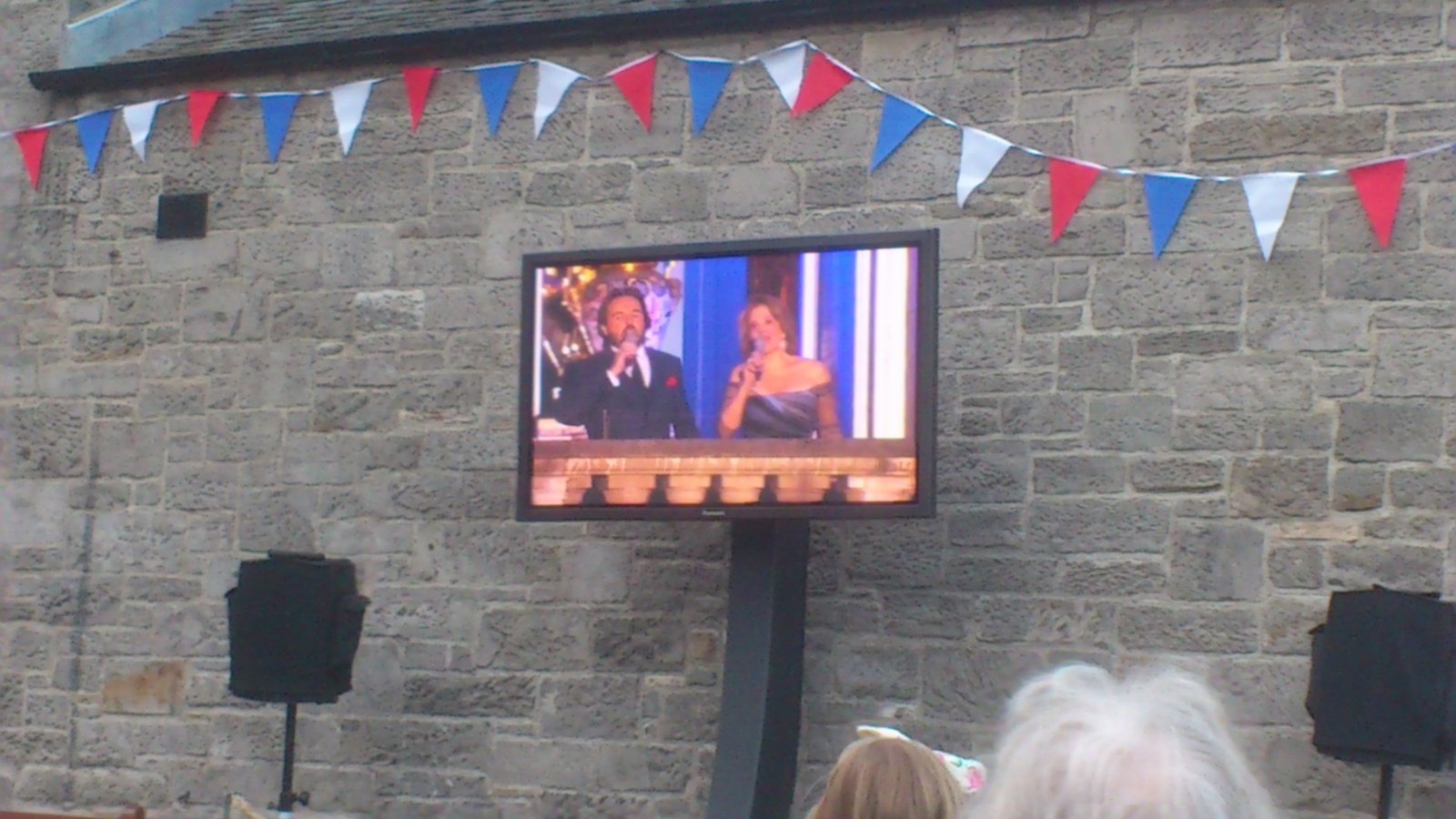
The Queen's Diamond Jubilee Concert viewed at Holyrood Palace

The concert was broadcast live on BBC One, BBC One HD and BBC Radio 2. American broadcaster ABC showed highlights the following day after as Concert for the Queen: A Diamond Jubilee Celebration With Katie Couric as well as an encore airing on 9 June. Broadcasting unions announced in April 2012 that they would ballot their members over taking strike action due to an ongoing pay dispute with the BBC, leading to media speculation that the BBC coverage of the concert could be affected. It was later confirmed that the BBC's coverage would not be affected by any strikes. It aired on 5 June on CBC television in Canada. BBC Entertainment showed the concert on 8 June in Latin America.

The concert aired from 19:30 until approximately 23:00 UK time. In the UK the programme was seen by an average of 15.32 million viewers on BBC One, making it the 6th highest UK TV audience of 2012, but peaking near 17 million.

For the ABC broadcast the following aired:

- will.i.am and Jessie J – "I Gotta Feeling" / "This Is Love"
- Jessie J – "Domino"
- Tom Jones – "Mama Told Me (Not To Come)" and "Delilah"
- Kylie Minogue – medley "Spinning Around", "Can't Get You Out Of My Head", "Step Back In Time" and "All The Lovers"
- Elton John – "I'm Still Standing", "Your Song" and "Crocodile Rock"
- Stevie Wonder – "Sir Duke", "Isn't She Lovely", "Happy Birthday" (with will.i.am) and "Superstition"
- Madness – "Our House" and "It Must Be Love"
- Paul McCartney – "All My Loving", "Let It Be", "Live and Let Die" and "Ob-La-Di, Ob-La-Da"
- Finish – Prince Charles made a speech at the end of the concert
- The National Anthem was played, which majority sang.
- Grand Finale – The Queen lit the National Beacon followed by a display of fireworks, during which the melodies of several national hymns were played.
  - Annie Lennox's participation was listed in the program description yet her appearance did not air.

The show of 5 June on ABC opened to 6.4 million (4.1/6) before rising in the second hour to 7.2 million (4.7/8) for an average of 6.8 million viewers for the evening.

The broadcast was aired on Channel 9 in Australia on 5 June – and was broadcast in its entirety apart from:

- Interlude – Jimmy Carr
- Lang Lang – "Hungarian Rhapsody" / "Rhapsody In Blue"
- Interlude – Miranda Hart
- Interlude – Lenny Henry
- Jools Holland and Ruby Turner – "You Are So Beautiful"
- Interlude – Jimmy Carr

== See also ==
- Party at the Palace
- Prom at the Palace
- Platinum Party at the Palace
