= With a Little Love =

Single by Sam Brown

from the album April Moon
- B-side: "Window People"
- Released: 19 February 1990
- Length: 3:48
- Label: A&M
- Songwriters: Margo Buchanan; Sam Brown
- Producers: Pete Brown; Sam Brown

Sam Brown singles chronology
"Can I Get a Witness" (1989)	"With a Little Love" (1990)	"Kissing Gate" (1990)

"With a Little Love" is a song by English singer-songwriter Sam Brown, released on 19 February 1990 as the lead single from her second studio album, April Moon. It was written by Margo Buchanan and Sam Brown, and produced by Pete Brown and Sam Brown. "With a Little Love" reached No. 44 on the UK Singles Chart and remained in the Top 100 for four weeks.

== Critical reception ==
Upon its release, Music & Media picked "With a Little Love" as their "Single of the Week". They described the song as "easy-going and full of melodic charm", and added, "Although it breaks no new ground stylistically, the song is extremely seductive." Stephen Lamacq of New Musical Express praised the song as " a stout, likeable number with an ear-bending hook and a background hint of Cyndi Lauper". David Giles of Music Week considered it to be "uptempo mid-Atlantic pop with enough guitar to suggest serious intent". He noted Brown sounds "more distinctive" and her "huskiness more pronounced", drawing comparisons between her and Bonnie Tyler, but felt the music is "fast heading into Belinda Carlisle territory". He concluded that "another 'Stop!' is needed to get her back on the hit trail".

Tim Jeffery of Record Mirror considered the song to be a "real disappointment". He commented, "Sam's rich and exquisitely sexy voice is wasted on this rather drippy, mid-tempo song that borders on MOR country." Jeffery believed the "very safe and radio-friendly" song would do well commercially, but added "it would be nice to see Sam stretching herself on something a little more gutsy". Brett Thomas of The Sydney Morning Herald felt that despite the "overwhelming indifference" to the song's release as a single, it "shouts 'hit record'".

== Track listing ==
7" single

1. "With a Little Love" - 3:48
2. "Window People" - 5:28

12" and CD single

1. "With a Little Love" - 3:48
2. "Long Way Down" - 3:29
3. "Window People" - 5:28
4. "Dolly Mixture" - 3:20

== Personnel ==
With a Little Love

- Sam Brown - vocals
- Pete Brown - guitar
- Paul Bangash - guitar, backing vocals
- Danny Schogger - piano
- Joe Brown - mandolin
- Guy Barker - piccolo trumpet
- Matthew Seligman - bass
- Richard Newman - drums
- Martin Ditcham - percussion
- Vicki Brown - backing vocals

Window People

- Sam Brown - vocals
- Pete Brown - guitar, backing vocals
- Paul Bangash - guitar
- Danny Schogger - keyboards, programming
- Richard Newman - drums
- Margo Buchanan - backing vocals

Long Way Down

- Sam Brown - vocals, organ
- Pete Brown - guitar, backing vocals
- Paul Bangash - guitar
- Simeon Jones, Cameron Jenkins - saxophone
- Matthew Seligman - bass
- Richard Newman - drums
- Tina Warrilow, Sara Jones, Vicki Brown, Margo Buchanan - backing vocals

Dolly Mixture

- Sam Brown - vocals, organ
- Pete Brown - guitar, synthesiser, backing vocals
- Paul Bangash - guitar, backing vocals
- Ian Maidman - bass, backing vocals
- Richard Newman - drums, backing vocals
- Phil Saatchi - percussion, backing vocals

Production

- Pete Brown, Sam Brown - producers (all tracks)
- Julian Mendelsohn - mixing on "With a Little Love"
- Jock Loveband - engineer (all tracks)
- Pete Brown - additional engineering on "With a Little Love" and "Long Way Down", recording and mixing on "Window People"
- Robin Evans - engineer on "With a Little Love", recording and mixing on "Long Way Down" and "Dolly Mixture"
- James Monkman, Alan Barclay - engineers on "Window People"

Other

- Robert Ogilvie - photography
- Jeremy Pearce - design

== Charts ==
Chart (1990)	Peak position
Australia (ARIA)	27
West Germany (GfK)	52
UK Singles (OCC)	44
European Airplay (European Hit Radio)	10
Swiss Airplay (Music & Media)	9
