= Platinum Party at the Palace =

2022 London concert for Queen Elizabeth II

- Commemoration concert by various artists
- The titlecard to host broadcaster BBC's coverage of the event
- Venue: The Mall, London, England
- Date: 4 June 2022
- Duration: 2 hours 30 minutes
- Producer: BBC Studios Events Productions
- Attendance: 22,000

The Platinum Party at the Palace was a British music concert, held outside Buckingham Palace on The Mall in London on 4 June 2022, in celebration of the Platinum Jubilee of Queen Elizabeth II. The concert began at 20:00 (BST). Comedian Lee Mack served as host for the event while the Queen appeared with Paddington Bear in a pre-recorded comedy segment, which showed her offering tea to Paddington, pulling a marmalade sandwich from her handbag and tapping her tea cup to the beat of We Will Rock You. Prince William spoke about the state of the natural world and pointed out his family's involvement with tackling environmental issues, while the Prince of Wales gave the closing speech and paid tribute to his mother's "lifetime of selfless service". Pre-taped messages of tribute from Sir Paul McCartney and former US First Lady Michelle Obama were also played during the event.

The Platinum Party at the Palace followed three concerts held at the palace for the Queen's previous jubilees – the Prom at the Palace and Party at the Palace in 2002 and the Diamond Jubilee Concert in 2012.

== Ticketing ==
A ballot for 10,000 free tickets opened to the public on 24 February 2022 and closed at 23:59 (BST) on 23 March. 7,500 tickets were reserved for key workers, volunteers, charities and members of the Armed Forces. 22,000 people attended the event.

== Stage ==
The concert stage design consisted of three stages, linked by walkways, which created a 360-degree stage in front of Buckingham Palace and the Queen Victoria Memorial. There were 70 columns linking the stages together into one overall design, representing the Queen's 70-year reign. For the first time, two of the three stages sat immediately in front of Buckingham Palace.

Construction began around the first week of May to create 15,000 standing spaces around the memorial, and 7,000 seated in the north and south stands.

== Concert ==
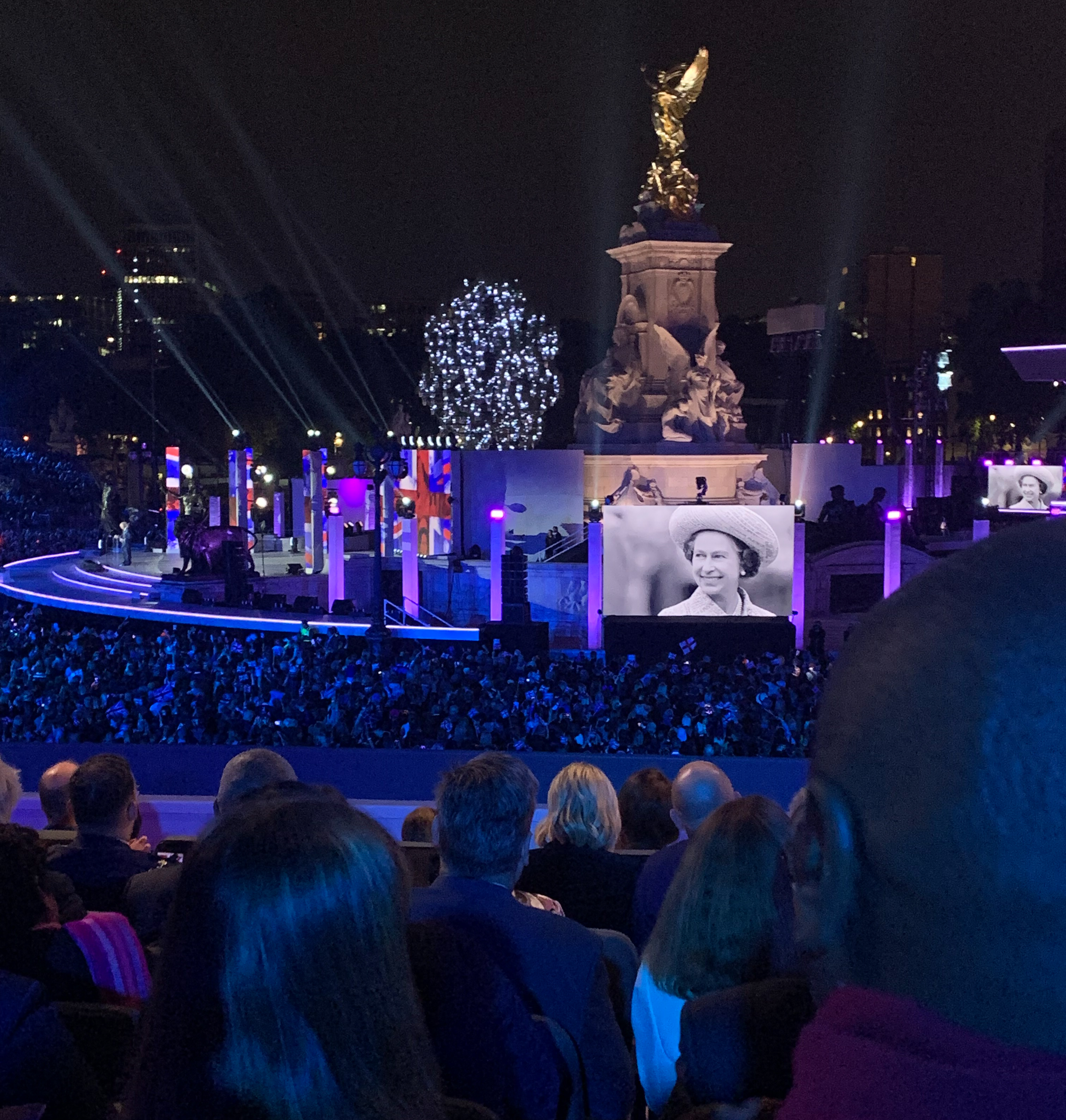
A view of the concert from the Royal Box

=== Opening ===
The Queen acted in a sketch, which was directed by Mark Burton, to open the concert. In the sketch, the Queen hosts Paddington Bear (voiced by Ben Whishaw) for tea in honour of the Jubilee. The Queen is seen patiently tolerating a tea-slurping Paddington who, upon realising his mistake, attempts to pour tea for her. However, he stomps over a pastry on the table and ends up covering a footman (played by Simon Farnaby) in cream. As the bear offers the Queen a marmalade sandwich, and tells her that he always keeps one for emergencies, the Queen confides "So do I" and, prising open her handbag, tells him: "I keep mine in here". Later, the bear congratulates the Queen on her reign, exclaiming: "Happy Jubilee Ma'am. And thank you for everything". The sequence ends with both the Queen and Paddington using a spoon to tap out the beat of Queen's "We Will Rock You" on teacup. The sketch later won the Memorable Moment Award at the 2023 British Academy Television Awards.

The Queen spent around half a day filming the sketch at Windsor Castle, and had since kept it a secret from some of her family members. A Buckingham Palace spokesman stated: "While the Queen may not be attending the concert in person, she was very keen that people understood how much it meant to her and that all those watching had a great time. [...] Her Majesty is well known for her sense of humour, so it should be no surprise that she decided to take part in tonight's sketch."

In an interview on BBC Radio 2 in November 2026, Simon Farnaby revealed that the Queen was very hard of hearing and could only see two feet in front of her, and as such did not recognise him despite her secretary telling him that she liked Horrible Histories.

=== Setlist ===
In order, the performers were:

- Queen + Adam Lambert
  - "We Will Rock You"
  - "Don't Stop Me Now"
  - "We Are the Champions
- Jax Jones
  - "You Don't Know Me"
  - "Instruction" (ft. Stefflon Don + Nandi Bushell)
  - "Don't Call Me Up" (ft. Mabel)
  - "Ring Ring" (ft. Mabel)
  - "Where Did You Go?" (ft. John Newman)
- Elbow and the Citizens of the World Choir
  - "One Day Like This"
- Diversity – 'The History of British Pop', dancing to:
  - The Beatles – "She Loves You"
  - Bee Gees – "Night Fever"
  - David Bowie – "Let's Dance"
  - Spice Girls – "Spice Up Your Life"
  - One Direction – "What Makes You Beautiful"
  - Stormzy – "Big for Your Boots"
- Craig David
  - "Ain't Giving Up"
  - "Re-Rewind (The Crowd Say Bo Selecta)"
  - "Fill Me In"
- Mimi Webb
  - "House on Fire"
- Andrew Lloyd Webber and Lin-Manuel Miranda – Musicals medley
  - "Wait for It"
  - "Phantom of the Opera"
  - "Circle of Life" (ft. Lebo M)
  - "Ex-Wives/Six"
  - "Any Dream Will Do" (ft. Jason Donovan)
- Sam Ryder
  - "Space Man"
- George Ezra
  - "Green Green Grass"
  - "Shotgun"
- Rod Stewart
  - "Baby Jane"
  - "Sweet Caroline"
- Andrea Bocelli
  - "Nessun dorma"
- Duran Duran
  - "Notorious" (ft. Nile Rodgers and Ms Banks)
  - "Girls on Film"
- Alicia Keys
  - "Superwoman"
  - "Girl on Fire"
  - "City of Gods"
  - "Empire State of Mind (Part II) Broken Down"
- Hans Zimmer
  - Excerpts from Planet Earth II
  - "What a Wonderful World" (ft. Celeste)
- Elton John
  - "Your Song" (pre-recorded at Windsor Castle)
- Sigala ft. Ella Eyre
  - "Came Here for Love"
- Mica Paris, Ruby Turner and Nicola Roberts
  - "Climb Ev'ry Mountain"
- Diana Ross
  - "Chain Reaction"
  - "Thank You"
  - "Ain't No Mountain High Enough"

=== Speech by the Prince of Wales ===
Looking back, we think of the countless State occasions that are milestones along this nation's road. And you will think of red boxes, filled with Government papers, at the end of the day. You will remember those who have led this country. Indeed, all the countries you serve. And leaders across the entire world. How things have changed… We think of all you have done to make the Commonwealth such an important force for good. You continue to make history.

— Charles, Prince of Wales, 2022

The then-Prince of Wales gave a speech at the concert to pay tribute to the Queen's "lifetime of selfless service in pictures, in words and in light". "Your Majesty, Mummy", he began. "The scale of this evening's celebration – and the outpouring of warmth and affection over this whole Jubilee weekend – is our way of saying thank you – from your family, the country, the Commonwealth, in fact the whole world".

He said "the Queen is watching these celebrations with much emotion, having, I hope, finished her marmalade sandwich, including immense regret that she cannot be here in person with us this evening. But Windsor Castle is barely twenty miles away. If we cheer loudly enough, she might, might just hear us - so let's all join together with three enormous cheers for Her Majesty!"

After the speech, the concert attendees all sang the British national anthem, "God Save the Queen".

=== Drone show ===
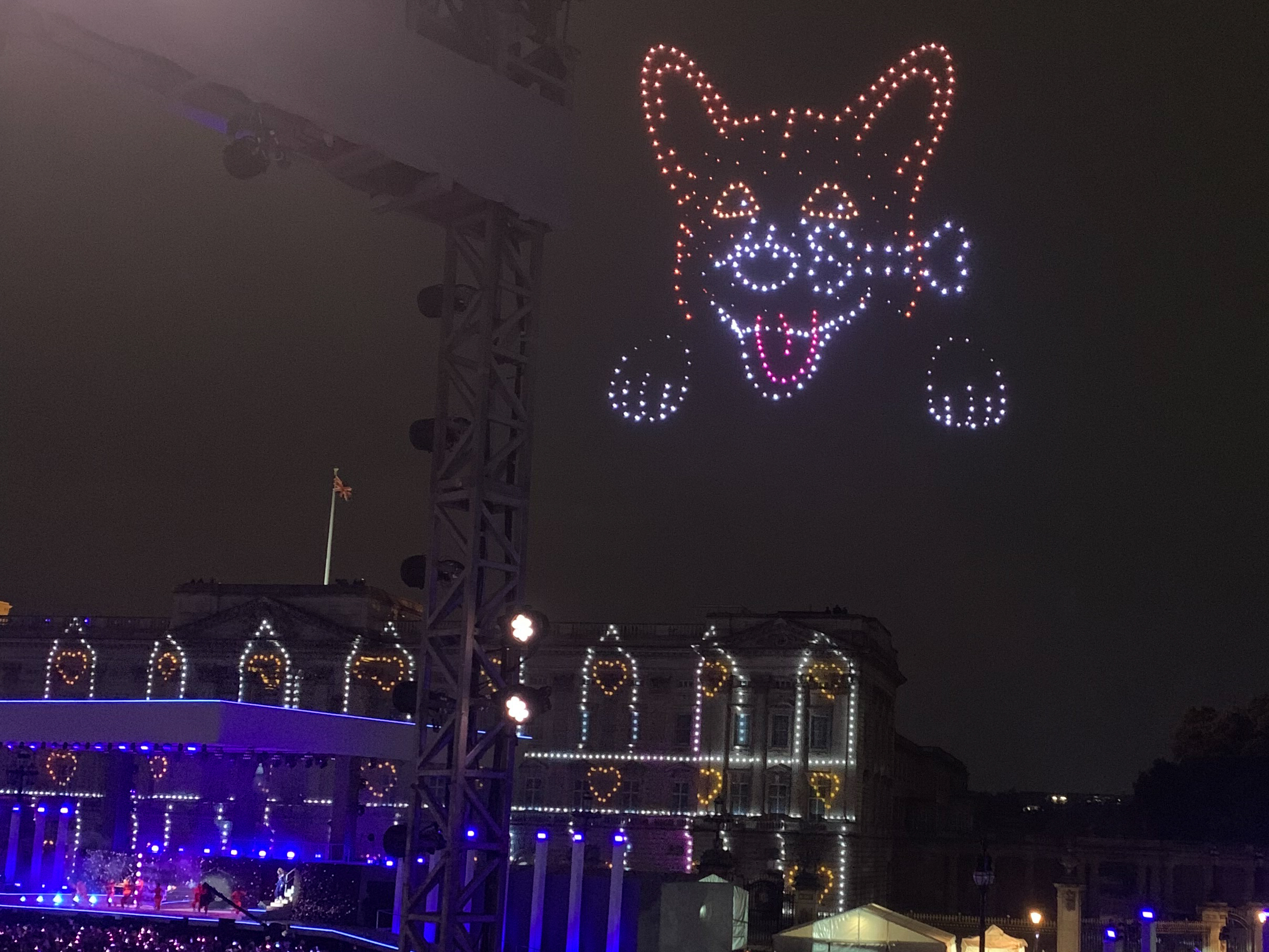
Drones forming a corgi above Buckingham Palace

During the concert, a display of 400 drones, produced by drone light show company Sky Magic, took place above Buckingham Palace. The drones created several images in the sky including a Union flag, a corgi, a stamp, a cup of tea, the Queen's signature Launer handbag, the number "70" with a crown in the centre of the "0". The show also delivered a subtle nod to the Queen's love of horse riding, and at the end the drones formed a "Thank you, Ma'am" message.

== Broadcasting ==
The concert was staged and broadcast live by the BBC, and members of the public were invited to apply for attendance. In the United States, the event was shown on ABC and later made available to be streamed on Hulu. In Canada, the event was shown on Global, which simulcast the United States airing. In Australia, the event was shown on Channel 7, Channel 9 and BBC UKTV and is available to stream on BritBox. The concert became the most watched television event of 2022 in the UK (later surpassed by the UEFA Women's Euro 2022 Final) with a peak viewing figure of 13.3 million and an average audience of 11.2 million people.
