= Party at the Palace =

Pop/rock concert commemorating the golden jubilee of Queen Elizabeth II

- Commemoration concert by various artists
- Logo
- Venue: Buckingham Palace Garden, London, England
- Date: 3 June 2002
- Duration: 3 hours 30 minutes

The Party at the Palace was a rock/pop music concert held at Buckingham Palace Garden in London on 3 June 2002. The event was in commemoration of the Golden Jubilee of Queen Elizabeth II held over the Golden Jubilee Weekend. It was the pop/rock equivalent of the Prom at the Palace, that showcased classical music. 10 years later the Diamond Jubilee Concert for the Queen's Diamond Jubilee was held in 2012, followed by the Platinum Party at the Palace for the Queen's Platinum Jubilee in 2022.

== Event and venue ==
The concert was held at the gardens of Buckingham Palace as part of the Golden Jubilee. Sir George Martin and Phil Ramone served as consultants for organising the show. Sir Michael Peat, Keeper of the Privy Purse, was one of the main organisers. The event was touted as the greatest concert in Britain since Live Aid or possibly ever. Tickets to the event were determined by a lottery and 3,000 telephones lines were set up to deal with the calls from applicants. Around two million applications were submitted to attend either the Party or the Prom at the Palace. 12,000 people attended the pop concert. They were provided by the palace with hampers packed with food and champagne. An estimated 1 million people watched outside the Palace in The Mall and around the Queen Victoria Memorial, and 200 million on television. The police arrested one person during the event. The concert included performances of many hit songs from the reign of Queen Elizabeth II. The event was the culmination of a national day of partying. The BBC Music Live Festival also occurred on the day. At 13:00, towns across the United Kingdom had bands play The Beatles hit "All You Need Is Love" before church bells were rung around the country.

== House band ==
The house band for the performance consisted of Phil Palmer (guitar), Pino Palladino (bass), Paul "Wix" Wickens (keyboards), Phil Collins (drums), Ray Cooper (percussion), Eric Robinson (saxophone), Sam Brown, Margo Buchanan and Claudia Fontaine (backing vocals) and the Royal Academy of Music Symphony Orchestra conducted by Michael Kamen. The house band performed with many of the guest artists that were featured, however some performers brought their own musicians to the concert.

== Hosts ==
The concert was hosted by Lenny Henry and Ben Elton. Between some acts were short comedy segments featuring Meera Syal, Nina Wadia, Ruby Wax, Kermit the Frog (performed by Steve Whitmire), and Barry Humphries (in characters as Dame Edna Everage and Sir Les Patterson).

== Performances ==
Song	Artists	Notes
"God Save the Queen"	Queen (Brian May, Roger Taylor) with house orchestra	May performed on the roof of Buckingham Palace and Taylor played with the orchestra on the stage
"The Cup of Life"/"B with Me"	Ricky Martin and Mis-Teeq	
"Livin' La Vida Loca"	Ricky Martin	
"Don't Stop Movin'"	S Club 7	
"Sisters Are Doin' It for Themselves"	Annie Lennox	
"You Can't Hurry Love"	Phil Collins	Phil Collins performed the main vocals and Roger Taylor played the drums
"Dancing in the Street"	Atomic Kitten	
"I Heard It Through the Grapevine"	Will Young	
"Get Ready"	Blue	
"Baby Love"	Emma Bunton	
"Stop! In the Name of Love"	Mis-Teeq	
"Sex Bomb"	Tom Jones	
"The Long and Winding Road"	The Corrs	
"Dancing in the Moonlight"	Toploader	
"Goldfinger"	Shirley Bassey	
"(Everything I Do) I Do It for You"	Bryan Adams	Phil Collins played drums; the recording of this performance was included on Collins's 2018 compilation Plays Well with Others
"You Can Leave Your Hat On"	Tom Jones and Blue	
"Radio Ga Ga"	Queen (Brian May, Roger Taylor)	Phil Collins took Taylor's place on drums for this song, while Taylor performed the lead vocal
"We Will Rock You"	Queen (Brian May, Roger Taylor) and London cast of We Will Rock You	May performed the lead vocal
"We Are The Champions"	Queen (Brian May, Roger Taylor), Will Young and London cast of We Will Rock You	Young performed the lead vocal
"Bohemian Rhapsody"	Queen (Brian May, Roger Taylor), and London cast of We Will Rock You	Tony Vincent (Galileo) principal vocalist, Hannah Jane Fox (Scaramouche) second vocalist, Sharon D. Clarke (Killer Queen) third vocalist
"If I Ruled the World"	Tony Bennett	
"Why"	Annie Lennox	Phil Collins played drums; the recording of this performance was included on Collins's 2018 compilation Plays Well with Others
"Living Doll"	Cliff Richard	
"Move It"	Cliff Richard, S Club 7 and Brian May	
"Paranoid"	Ozzy Osbourne and Tony Iommi	Phil Collins played the drums for this song.
"I Want Love"	Elton John	Pre-recorded in the Music Room inside Buckingham Palace.
"California Girls"	Brian Wilson	
"The Warmth of the Sun"	Brian Wilson and Eric Clapton	
"God Only Knows"	Brian Wilson and The Corrs	
"Good Vibrations"	Brian Wilson with Emma Bunton, Atomic Kitten and Cliff Richard	
"Layla"	Eric Clapton	Phil Collins played drums; the recording of this performance was included on Collins's 2018 compilation Plays Well with Others
"Gimme Some Lovin'"	Steve Winwood	
"With a Little Help from My Friends"	Joe Cocker, Steve Winwood and Brian May	Phil Collins played drums; the recording of this performance was included on Collins's 2018 compilation Plays Well with Others
"Lola"	Ray Davies	
"Handbags and Gladrags"	Rod Stewart	
"Her Majesty"/"Blackbird"	Paul McCartney	Does not appear on the DVD
"While My Guitar Gently Weeps"	Eric Clapton and Paul McCartney	
"Sgt. Pepper's Lonely Hearts Club Band (Reprise)"/"The End"	Paul McCartney	Does not appear on the DVD
"All You Need Is Love"	Paul McCartney, Rod Stewart, Joe Cocker, Brian Wilson, Queen (Brian May, Roger Taylor), Eric Clapton, Cliff Richard, Ozzy Osbourne and Ladysmith Black Mambazo	Joined by the rest of the performers part way through the song
"Hey Jude"	Paul McCartney and the rest of the performers	
"I Saw Her Standing There"	Paul McCartney	Does not appear on the DVD

== Aspects of concert ==
The concert began with Brian May performing "God Save the Queen" on the roof of Buckingham Palace as a guitar solo with support from the orchestra onstage in the Garden far below. This sequence was filmed, including some upward photography of May in full "rock god" mode and shots of the crowd in the Garden below. It has become an iconic moment and Brian May himself has said in interview that he hoped that he would strike the last chord at the same time as the orchestra in the gardens far below. Once it was finished, said May, the arm and fist went up, and the guitar was free, for it had done its work. Ozzy Osbourne said in the same interview that this was the greatest moment of his career and pronounced the Queen to be "a beautiful woman."

Phil Collins played drums for many of the artists, as well as singing his 1983 UK number one single "You Can't Hurry Love", with Queen's Roger Taylor playing drums. Taylor took late singer Freddie Mercury's place by singing lead vocals for the band's 1984 number two hit "Radio Ga Ga" (which Taylor had also written), with Collins playing drums in place of Taylor.

S Club 7's performance of "Don't Stop Movin'" was announced as the last time the group would be performing as a septet, as Paul Cattermole had announced his departure from the group prior to the event. Some performances shown on TV are missing on the DVD release.

Tribute band The Bootleg Beatles also performed at the concert, though their performance wasn't on the DVD and didn't get to meet McCartney.

== Royal family commemoration ==
We feel proud of you; proud and grateful for everything you have done for your country and the Commonwealth over 50 extraordinary years, supported unfailingly throughout by my father. You have embodied something vital in our lives - continuity. You have been a beacon of tradition and stability in the midst of profound, sometimes perilous change.

— Charles, Prince of Wales, 2002

The event ended with the Royal Family joining the stars onstage. Prince Charles thanked his mother for her fifty years on the throne, famously beginning his speech with the words, "Your Majesty... Mummy!" to the delight of the crowd and bemusement of the Queen.

Following this the Queen and Prince Philip went to light the National Beacon on the Mall using the Millennium flame, which she had previously used to light a beacon on the River Thames on Millennium Eve in 1999. After the lighting of the beacon a massive 15-minute firework show took place. During this time different symbols were projected onto the palace including a Union Flag.

== Recordings ==
A condensed version of the concert was released on DVD. Some portions have been cut, e.g. Ruby Wax's monologue, Dame Edna's introduction of Paul McCartney performing "Blackbird" and Paul McCartney's spontaneous performance of "Her Majesty".

A live CD recording of the performance was also released in 2002.

4 songs can be found on Phil Collins' 4 CD Boxset, Plays Well with Others, Layla by Eric Clapton, Why by Annie Lennox, (Everything I Do) I Do It for You by Bryan Adams and With a Little Help from My Friends by Joe Cocker. Collins played drums on each of these songs.

== See also ==
- Prom at the Palace
- Diamond Jubilee Concert
- Platinum Party at the Palace
