= Stop! (album) =

Studio album by Sam Brown
- Released: 8 June 1988
- Studios: The Power Plant (London); Greene Street (New York City)
- Genres: Pop; blue-eyed soul; jazz; rhythm and blues; pop rock
- Length: 54:45 (CD); 43:50 (vinyl)
- Label: A&M
- Producers: Pete Brown; Sam Brown; Pete Smith; Danny Schogger; John Madden

Sam Brown chronology
Stop! (1988)	April Moon (1990)

Singles from Stop!
- 1. "Walking Back to Me" Released: 1988; 2. "Stop!" Released: 2 May 1988; 3. "This Feeling" Released: 1988; 4. "Can I Get a Witness" Released: 1989

Stop! is the debut studio album by the English singer-songwriter Sam Brown, released on 8 June 1988 by A&M Records. It includes Brown's biggest and best-known single, the title track "Stop!".

== Background ==
Produced by Sam Brown, her brother Pete Brown, Pete Smith, Danny Schogger, and John Madden, the album was recorded at the Power Plant in London, with then-Pink Floyd member David Gilmour's guitar parts on "This Feeling" and "I'll Be in Love" being recorded at Greene Street Studios in New York City. The track "Merry Go Round" has lyrics slightly adapted from W. H. Davies poem "Leisure". The CD edition of the album includes cover versions of Marvin Gaye's "Can I Get a Witness" and Ike & Tina Turner's "Nutbush City Limits".

== Release ==
On release, Stop! was received favourably by the majority of music critics. Brown's most commercially successful album, it went on to peak at number four on the UK Albums Chart and reached number 13 on the Australian ARIA Charts, also reaching the top 10 in countries such as Austria, the Netherlands, and New Zealand. It spawned three charting singles in the United Kingdom: "Stop!" peaked at number four on the UK Singles Chart; "This Feeling" peaked at number 91; "Can I Get a Witness" at number 15. The album has sold over two and a half million copies worldwide. It has been certified gold by the British Phonographic Industry (BPI) and platinum by Music Canada.

== Critical reception ==
Professional ratings
Review scores
Source	Rating
AllMusic	4/5 stars

Billboard noted that "in a year already jammed with fine debuts by distinctive female writer/singers, here comes another one. Brown has a strong, bluesy voice, and the string settings often lend fascinating counterpoint. The title track is an absolutely stunning blues - drenched number."

Cashbox stated "what a year this is for distinctive female voices! Sam Brown is a British export with a soulful set of pipes that can go from a whisper to a keening lament to a growl, all within the same bar. Her artfully textured, jazzified funk shares some of the same turf as Rickie Lee Jones and Kate Bush, but she's a huge talent in her own right and likely to set a standard by which others are compared for years to come."

In their review Music & Media called the album "rather old-fashioned poprock that nevertheless is more than just another record. Brown's voice is strong and expressive and her songs are largely excellent...both the material and Brown's voice are reminiscent of Kate Bush's first album. The songs vary from the sub PM grind of "Walking Back To Me" to the African influenced "Your Love Is All" and the excellent single "Stop".

== Track listing ==
Side one
No.	Title	Writer(s)	Length
1.	"Walking Back to Me"	Sam Brown; Gregg Sutton	3:40
2.	"Your Love Is All"	S. Brown; Margo Buchanan	4:09
3.	"Stop!"	S. Brown; Sutton; Bruce Brody	4:53
4.	"It Makes Me Wonder"	S. Brown; Buchanan	4:33
5.	"This Feeling"	S. Brown; Buchanan	3:21
6.	"Tea"	S. Brown	0:41

Side two
No.	Title	Writer(s)	Length
7.	"Piece of My Luck"	S. Brown	3:00
8.	"Ball and Chain"	S. Brown; Danny Schogger	4:34
9.	"Wrap Me Up"	S. Brown; Schogger	3:10
10.	"I'll Be in Love"	S. Brown; Schogger	5:16
11.	"Merry Go Round"	S. Brown; Vicki Brown	3:07
12.	"Sometimes You Just Don't Know"	S. Brown; Danny Malloy; Richard Brennan	3:05

Tracks not included on original LP release
No.	Title	Writer(s)	Length
13.	"Can I Get a Witness"	Eddie Holland; Lamont Dozier; Brian Holland	2:59
14.	"High as a Kite" (not on Australian pressing)	S. Brown; Schogger	3:24
15.	"Nutbush City Limits" (not on Australian pressing)	Tina Turner	4:25

== Personnel ==
Credits are adapted from the album's liner notes.

"Walking Back to Me"

- Sam Brown – lead vocals; piano
- Pete Brown – lesley guitar; backing vocals
- Paul Bangash – guitar
- Richard Newman – drums
- Jim Leverton – bass guitar
- Danny Schogger – keyboards
- Phil Saatchi – backing vocals

"Your Love Is All"

- Sam Brown – lead vocals
- Jakko Jakszyk – guitar; backing vocals
- Gavin Harrison – drums; percussion
- Ed Poole – bass guitar
- Pandit Dinesh – Indian percussion
- Andy Price – 1st violin
- Mark Watson – 2nd violin
- Kate Musker – viola
- Peter Esswood – cello
- Vicki Brown – backing vocals
- Pete Brown – backing vocals
- Kevin Malpass – string arrangements

"Stop!"

- Sam Brown – lead vocals; string arrangements
- Jakko Jakszyk – guitar
- Gavin Harrison – drums
- Ed Poole – bass guitar
- Kevin Malpass – Hammond organ; string arrangements
- Bob Andrews – Hammond organ solo
- Andy Price – 1st violin
- Mark Walton – 2nd violin
- Kate Musker – viola
- Peter Esswood – cello
- Vicki Brown – backing vocals
- Margo Buchanan – backing vocals

"It Makes Me Wonder"

- Sam Brown – lead vocals
- Phil Palmer – guitars
- Roland Kerridge – drums
- Ian Maidman – bass guitar
- Paul Fishman – keyboards
- Danny Cummings – percussion
- Vicki Brown – backing vocals
- Margo Buchanan – backing vocals
- Phil Saatchi – backing vocals
- Helen Chappelle – backing vocals
- Pete Smith – backing vocals

"This Feeling"

- Sam Brown – lead vocals
- David Gilmour – guitar
- Richard Newman – drums
- Jim Leverton – bass guitar
- Danny Schogger – piano; keyboards; piano accordion
- Pete Brown – acoustic guitars
- Vicki Brown – backing vocals

"Tea"

- Sam Brown – lead vocals
- Danny Schogger – all keyboards

"Piece of My Luck"

- Sam Brown – lead vocals
- Jakko Jakszyk – acoustic guitar
- Gavin Harrison – drums
- Danny Thompson – double bass
- Bobby Valentino – violin
- Julian Stringle – clarinet
- Alan Wickham – trumpet
- Rex O'Dell – trombone
- Pete Brown – backing vocals
- Richard Newman – backing vocals

"Ball and Chain"

- Sam Brown – lead vocals
- Jakko Jakszyk – guitar
- Gavin Harrison – drums
- Ed Poole – bass guitar
- Bob Andrews – Hammond organ
- Danny Schogger – keyboards
- Vicki Brown – backing vocals

"Wrap Me Up"

- Sam Brown – lead vocals
- Jakko Jakszyk – guitars
- Paul Bangash – guitar solo
- Charlie Morgan – drum programming
- Richard Newman – hooligan drums
- Danny Schogger – keyboards
- Pete Brown – backing vocals

"I'll Be In Love"

- Sam Brown – lead vocals
- David Gilmour – guitar
- Danny Schogger – all keyboards; programming; arrangements

"Merry Go Round"

- Sam Brown – lead vocals; all other keyboards
- Danny Schogger – keyboard effects
- Paul Bangash – guitar
- Pete Brown – programming
- Jim Abbiss – programming; Russian strings

"Sometimes You Just Don't Know"

- Sam Brown – lead vocals; piano
- Jakko Jakszyk – guitar; backing vocals
- Pete Brown – guitar; backing vocals
- Danny Schogger – keyboards
- Gavin Harrison – drums
- Ed Poole – bass guitar
- Paul Bangash – backing vocals

"Can I Get a Witness"

- Sam Brown – lead vocals
- Joe Brown – lead guitar
- Phil Palmer – rhythm guitar
- Roland Kerridge – drums
- Ian Maidman – bass guitar
- Kenny Craddock – Hammond organ
- Danny Cummings – percussion
- Stuart Brooks – trumpet
- John Huckridge – trumpet
- Dave Hancock – trumpet
- Chris Pyne – trombone
- Pete Smith – trombone
- Chris Dean – trombone
- Stan Sulzmann – saxophone
- Jamie Talbot – saxophone
- Jeff Daly – saxophone
- Vicki Brown – backing vocals
- Margo Buchanan – backing vocals
- Phil Saatchi – backing vocals
- Helen Chappelle – backing vocals
- Pete Smith – backing vocals
- Billy Vanderpuye – backing vocals

"High as a Kite"

- Sam Brown – lead vocals
- Jakko Jakszyk – guitars
- Gavin Harrison – drums; marimba
- Ed Poole – bass guitar
- Danny Schogger – piano; keyboards
- Andy Price – 1st violin
- Mark Walton – 2nd violin
- Kate Musker – viola
- Peter Esswood – cello
- Vicki Brown – backing vocals
- Margo Buchanan – backing vocals
- Kevin Malpass – string arrangements

"Nutbush City Limits"

- Sam Brown – lead vocals
- Joe Brown – rhythm guitar
- Paul Bangash – wah-wah guitar
- Richard Newman – drums
- Jim Leverton – bass guitar
- Danny Schogger – keyboards
- Steve Sidwell – trumpet
- Simon Gardner – trumpet
- Pete Beachill – trombone
- Jamie Talbot – tenor saxophone
- Dave Bishop – baritone saxophone
- Martin Ditcham – percussion
- Vicki Brown – backing vocals
- Andy Caine – backing vocals
- Kevin Malpass – brass arrangement

== Charts ==
=== Weekly charts ===
Weekly chart performance for Stop!
Chart (1988–1989)	Peak position
Australian Albums (ARIA)	13
Austrian Albums (Ö3 Austria)	2
Canada Top Albums/CDs (RPM)	13
Dutch Albums (Album Top 100)	4
European Albums (Music & Media)	12
Finnish Albums (Suomen virallinen lista)	1
French Albums (SNEP)	18
German Albums (Offizielle Top 100)	13
Icelandic Albums (Tónlist)	1
New Zealand Albums (RMNZ)	4
Norwegian Albums (VG-lista)	12
Swedish Albums (Sverigetopplistan)	18
Swiss Albums (Schweizer Hitparade)	6
UK Albums (Official Charts)	4

=== Year-end charts ===
1988 year-end chart performance for Stop!
Chart (1988)	Position
Dutch Albums (Album Top 100)	34

1989 year-end chart performance for Stop!
Chart (1989)	Position
Australian Albums (ARIA)	45
Canada Top Albums/CDs (RPM)	59
European Albums (Music & Media)	71
German Albums (Offizielle Top 100)	53
New Zealand Albums (RMNZ)	40
UK Albums (Gallup)	91

== Certifications ==
Certifications for Stop!
Region	Certification	Certified units/sales
Australia (ARIA)	Gold	35,000^{^}
Canada (Music Canada)	Platinum	100,000^{^}
Finland (Musiikkituottajat)	Gold	25,000
Germany (BVMI)	Gold	250,000^{^}
United Kingdom (BPI)	Gold	100,000^{^}
^{^} Shipments figures based on certification alone.

== Release history ==
Label	Cat. No.		Format	Date
A&M	395195-2	^{UK, and EU}	CD	1988
A&M	AMA 5195	^{UK, IL, ES, and AU}	LP	1988
A&M	395195-2, 395 195-2	^{EU}	CD	2005
