= 43 Minutes =

Studio album by Sam Brown
- Released: 1 March 1993
- Length: 43:35
- Label: Pod Music (UK, Australia); All At Once Records (Europe)
- Producer: Pete Brown

Sam Brown chronology
April Moon (1990)	43 Minutes (1993)	Box (1997)

43 Minutes is the third studio album by English female singer-songwriter Sam Brown. It was released in 1993 by Brown's own label, Pod Music.

43 Minutes peaked at No. 132 on Australia's ARIA Charts. "Fear of Life" was released as the album's only single, and reached No. 135 on the ARIA Charts. In 2019, a remastered edition of 43 Minutes was reissued on CD through Pod Music.

== Background ==
Brown began writing 43 Minutes in 1991, during which time her mother was dying of cancer. Once writing was completed, Brown's label, A&M Records, provided the singer with £11,000 to demo her new material, with recording taking place in the summer of 1992. When presented to A&M, the label raised concerns over the material not being commercial enough. They requested Brown record a cover version of a song with hit potential and include it on the album, but Brown refused and split from the label. She told the Windsor Star in 1994: "I made a creative decision that I'd rather have artistic fulfillment than financial success."

Brown then looked at releasing her new material independently. She bought back the rights from A&M, and worked some more on the existing recordings. 43 Minutes was released in 1993 through Brown's own label, Pod Music, and through All At Once Records in Europe. The initial release sold 4,000 copies, and Brown embarked on a 22-date UK tour in early 1993 to promote it.

Speaking of the album, Brown told Staines and Ashford News in 1992: "Musically it's very different to what I have done before. It's all piano with other instruments and quite mellow." She added in 2000: "43 Minutes is the first album that really represents me. It's not directly about my mother's death, but it is a whole piece and very fierce. It really homed in on what I thought, what death chucks up at you."

== Reception ==
Upon release, Penny Kiley of the Liverpool Echo commented: "The album is her most mature and most personal so far. Her voice is better than ever and the songs are particularly open - some obviously inspired by the death of her mother." H. M. Dickenson of The Sydney Morning Herald wrote: "Her new songs show more lyrical maturity than her earlier work and sensitive arrangements for real instruments bring out new depth in Sam's voice."

In their review, The Canberra Times commented that "if you are expecting the big sound which surrounded hits such as "Stop" and "With a Little Love", this release may take you by surprise. 43 Minutes contains a restrained, mellow sound — real simple piano bar stuff. There is nothing strikingly commercial and at best is a worthwhile dinner accomplice. But this is exactly how Brown wanted to sound, an expressive album which pays respect to her late mother and indicates she has put her personal life and goals into perspective."

== Track listing ==
All tracks are written by Sam Brown.

No.	Title	Length
1.	"Come into My World"	3:47
2.	"Into the Night"	3:25
3.	"In the Rain"	2:09
4.	"Fear of Life"	5:13
5.	"The Morning Song"	2:50
6.	"You Are the World"	5:38
7.	"See This Evil"	4:08
8.	"Your Time Is Your Own"	4:33
9.	"One Candle"	3:20
10.	"Letting Go"	4:24
11.	"Sleep Like a Baby"	3:39

== Personnel ==
- Sam Brown – vocals, piano, organ, harpsichord on tracks 6 and 8, Mellotron on track 4
- Pete Brown – guitar, vocals, bass guitar on track 5
- Herbie Flowers – bass guitar, double bass
- Tony Newman – drums
- Jody Linscott – percussion
- Danny Schogger – piano (track 3), keyboards (tracks 2, 6, 10)
- Anne Whitnell – cello (tracks 4–6, 10)
- Julian Stringle – clarinet (tracks 5–6, 11)
- Doris Brendel – backing vocals (tracks 4, 7–10), flageolet (track 11)
- Margo Buchanan, Julie Harrington – backing vocals (tracks 4, 7–10)
- Neil Gauntlett, Mike Sheridan, Phil Middleton, Alan Garfield – backing vocals (tracks 8–9, 11)
- Joe Brown – fiddle (track 1)
- Nick Ingman – string quartet arrangement (track 8)
- Gavyn Wright, Wilfred Gibson – violin (track 8)
- Bob Smissen – viola (track 8)
- Anthony Pleeth – cello (track 8)
- Paul Bangash – acoustic guitar (track 9)

Production

- Pete Brown – producer, recording, mixing
- Robin Wynn Evans – additional engineering, mixing
- Sean De Feo, Henry Binns, Danton Supple, Adrian Moore, Simon Wall – assistant engineers
- John Dent – mastering
