= This Feeling (Sam Brown song) =

1988 single by Sam Brown

Single by Sam Brown

from the album Stop!
- B-side: "Window People", "Soldiers", "Pitiful World", "Stop (edited version)"
- Released: 1988
- Recorded: 1988
- Genre: Blue-eyed soul
- Length: 3:21
- Label: A&M
- Songwriters: Sam Brown; Margo Buchanan
- Producers: Pete Brown; Sam Brown

Sam Brown singles chronology
"Stop!" (1988)	"This Feeling" (1988)	"Stop! (re-release)" (1989)

Music video
- "This Feeling" on YouTube

"This Feeling" is a song by the English singer-songwriter Sam Brown, written by Brown and Margo Buchanan. It was released by A&M and appears on her debut studio album, Stop! (1988). It is also one of two songs (along with I'll Be in Love") from the album to feature the guitar work of then Pink Floyd member David Gilmour. "This Feeling" was a top 30 hit in Belgium, while peaking at number 91 on the UK Singles Chart.

== Critical reception ==
Upon its release as a single, the Gloucestershire Echo awarded "This Feeling" a 9 out of 10 rating and wrote, "Sam Brown has a quite amazing voice – the gentle tune washes over you like a calming tonic and Dave Gilmour's more-than-excellent guitar playing is just the icing on the cake." Barry Young of the Aberdeen Press and Journal gave four out of five stars and remarked that Brown's "excellent voice makes this a pleasure to listen to". Jerry Smith of Music Week described it as a "dramatic ballad", but felt it is "hardly as compelling as some of [the] other tracks from her debut LP".

Lisa Tilston of Record Mirror acknowledged "more than a glimmer of potential in Sam's crystal voice", but considered the song to be "frankly, crapola" and added that "sub-Eurovision backing bands do not a hit single make". Andrew Hirst of the Huddersfield Daily Examiner commented, "Even the craftmanship of David Gilmour's guitar playing can't save this one from leaving a trail of mournful drudgery on the mind." Mick Mercer from Melody Maker called it a "no-go, sadly" and wrote, "She enters the studio where a sprawling guitar solo, by ultra-vital Dave Gilmour, lays waiting and emerges with a chorus looking for an outline. A noise and approach different to grab attention, it doesn't quite reach defoliated Kate Bush status. Which it should."

Paul Taylor of the Manchester Evening News felt it was "plain fare in comparison with that soulful single 'Stop!'" and continued, "It's merely an American-style power ballad whose only saving grace is some nice chirruping sound effects and a guitar solo from the always-welcome Dave Gilmour." Marcus Hodge, writing for the Cambridge Evening News, stated, "Her first single had plenty of bounce but this is dreary in the extreme. Dave Gilmour pops up half-way, and kills everything off."

== Track listings ==
- CD single – UK
1. "This Feeling (Remix)"
2. "Window People"
3. "Soldiers"
4. "Pitful World"
- 7" single – UK
1. "This Feeling"
2. "Soldiers"
- 12" single – UK

A1. "This Feeling (Remix)"
A2. "Window People"
B1. "Soldiers"
B2. "Pitiful World"

== Personnel ==
Credits are adapted from the album's liner notes.

- Sam Brown – lead vocals
- David Gilmour – guitar
- Richard Newman – drums
- Jim Leverton – bass guitar
- Danny Schogger – piano; keyboards; piano accordion
- Pete Brown – acoustic guitars
- Vicki Brown – backing vocals

== Charts ==
Chart (1988–1989)	Peak position
Belgium (Ultratop)	23
Canada Top Singles (RPM)	82
Netherlands (MegaCharts)	32
UK Singles (OCC)	91
Australia (ARIA)	115
Quebec (ADISQ)	20
