= ReBoot (Sam Brown album) =

Studio album by Sam Brown
- Released: 25 September 2000
- Length: 58:48
- Label: Mud Hut Records
- Producer: Sam Brown; Pete Brown

Sam Brown chronology
Box (1997)	ReBoot (2000)	Of the Moment (2007)

ReBoot is the fifth studio album from English female singer-songwriter Sam Brown, which was released in the UK by Mud Hut Records in 2000. It was released in the Netherlands the following year on the label Coast to Coast.

== Background ==
Speaking of the album, Brown said in 2000, "The first thing I should say is I decided for the first time I would produce at least part of my own album [alone] – although I'd done it for my mum. It's a big step and I didn't really have that much confidence. But my brother Pete was so positive."

A single, "In Light of All That's Gone Before", was released from the album. Brown said of the track in 2000, "When the band first played this song it sounded like Katrina and the Waves. That wasn't the idea at all because I'd got much more into blues and soul having worked with Jools a lot and I wanted a more contemporary vibe so I ended up doing it with samples and vocals." The song features Jools Holland on piano. The single included two exclusive tracks, "Brown Wood, Brown Water" and "Rise Above".

Brown embarked on a British tour to promote ReBoot. Both ReBoot and "In Light of All That's Gone Before" failed to generate commercial success. Brown commented in 2000, "It's bloody hard at the bottom end of the business. Access to radio play can be difficult, but the regionals have been good to me." In 2020, she recalled, "We did all the usual things. We tried to get radio and we plugged [the album]." She added, "I like that album. For me, it was a turning point. It made me a bit more confident in my production ideas."

== Critical reception ==
Upon its release, Music Week wrote, "Reboot is her fifth album and continues to show her abilities as a singer, though at times the material does not live up to her voice." The Herald said, "'In Light of All That's Gone Before' is perhaps the most radio-friendly release [from Brown] for a while and while it may not see her on Saturday morning TV with Ant and Dec, it's a good hook into the album." Worcester News described "In Light of All That's Gone Before" as a "cracking" single.

== Track listing ==
No.	Title	Writer(s)	Length
1.	"In Light of All That's Gone Before"	Sam Brown	5:34
2.	"Heartbeats"	S. Brown	4:54
3.	"Let Go Move On"	Richard Newman	4:32
4.	"Timebomb"	Phil Saatchi, Ian Sugar	5:23
5.	"Understand the Animal"	S. Brown, Pete Brown	4:46
6.	"Breathe in Life"	S. Brown	4:38
7.	"The Key"	S. Brown, P. Brown	4:27
8.	"Call Me"	S. Brown, Margo Buchanan	4:50
9.	"Out of Focus"	S. Brown	4:25
10.	"Blood Run Cold"	S. Brown	5:35
11.	"Learn to Listen"	S. Brown, P. Brown	6:13
12.	"Rainbow"	S. Brown	3:31

== Personnel ==
Credits are adapted from the ReBoot CD album booklet.

- Sam Brown – vocals (all tracks), Juno synthesiser (track 1), Hammond organ (tracks 1–2, 4, 6–8), percussion (tracks 1–2, 8), keyboards (tracks 2, 10), programming (tracks 2, 4), piano (tracks 5–6, 8–12), Rhodes (track 6), bass (track 11)
- Pete Brown – guitar (tracks 1–5, 7–9, 11), vocals (tracks 3–4, 11), programming (tracks 3, 5, 7, 9, 11), additional programming (track 4), percussion (track 7), bass (track 11)
- Jools Holland – piano (track 1)
- Robin Evans – drum loops (track 1, 8), programming (track 8), drums and percussion programming (track 10)
- Richard Newman – drums (tracks 2–5, 7–9)
- Aaron McRobbie – bass (tracks 2, 4–9)
- Christopher Holland – Hammond organ (tracks 3, 5), piano (tracks 3, 5)
- Claudia Fontaine, Aitch McRobbie – backing vocals (tracks 3, 5–6, 8)
- Des Barkus – harmonica (tracks 4, 7)

Production

- Sam Brown – producer (tracks 1–2, 4, 6, 8, 10, 12)
- Pete Brown – producer (tracks 3, 5, 7, 9, 11), mixing (tracks 3, 5, 7, 9, 11)
- Robin Evans – mixing (tracks 1–2, 4, 6, 8, 10, 12), engineer (all tracks)

Other

- Karen Fuchs – front and back cover photography
- Soulla Petrou – additional photography
