= Kissing Gate (song) =

Single by Sam Brown

from the album April Moon
- B-side: "Is It Mustard or Mango?"
- Released: 23 April 1990
- Length: 2:48
- Label: A&M
- Songwriters: Sam Brown; Pete Brown; Paul Bangash; Tina Warrilow; Sara Jones
- Producers: Pete Brown; Sam Brown

Sam Brown singles chronology
"With a Little Love" (1990)	"Kissing Gate" (1990)	"Once in Your Life" (1990)

"Kissing Gate" is a song by English singer-songwriter Sam Brown, which was released on 23 April 1990 as the second single from her second studio album April Moon. The song was written by Sam Brown, Pete Brown, Paul Bangash, Tina Warrilow and Sara Jones, and was produced by Pete Brown and Sam Brown.

"Kissing Gate" reached No. 23 in the UK and remained in the charts for eight weeks. It is Brown's last single to reach the UK Top 40. The song also reached No. 57 on the Eurochart Hot 100 Singles chart.

Speaking of the song in relation to "Stop!" in 1990, Brown said: "They've both got the same old-song-style feel to them. But "Kissing Gate" is more tongue-in-cheek; it's not as serious as "Stop!"."

== Reception ==
On its release, Eleanor Levy of Record Mirror wrote, "A song that can't make up its mind whether it's a bluesy ballad like 'Stop', or a rocky little number like that dreadful Alannah Miles record. In the end all you're left with is Sam's great voice and, as with so many pop stars with 'voices', Sam wants to show us just how good it is by shouting. Sometimes a whisper can speak volumes." The Press and Journal stated, "Romantic number with full orchestral backing. She was a very full voice, which she uses to its limit here. Unfortunately it just does not have the punch that "Stop!" had."

Simon Lloyd of the Reading Evening Post described the song as "an infectious little number which more than adequately provides a vehicle for Sam's earthy vocals". Jennifer Grant of the Perthshire Advertiser commented, "There's nowt coming over this girl's vocal chords - she's got an excellent voice. "Kissing Gate" [is] really quite pleasant. However, a romantic string arrangement is probably not catchy enough to have the same sort of commercial success."

== Track listing ==
7" and cassette single

1. "Kissing Gate" - 2:48
2. "Is It Mustard or Mango?" - 3:11

12" and CD single

1. "Kissing Gate" - 2:48
2. "Is It Mustard or Mango?" - 3:11
3. "Here You Are Again" - 3:42
4. "Trick of the Imagination" - 5:20

== Personnel ==
Kissing Gate

- Sam Brown - vocals, organ, piano
- Pete Brown, Paul Bangash - guitar
- Gavyn Wright, Pete Oxer, Jim Archer, John Williams, Tim Good, Ben Cruft, Mark Berrow - violin
- Chris Wellington, Paul Silverthorne - viola
- Ben Kennard, Paul Kegg - cello
- Nick Ingman - string conductor
- David Levy - bass
- Richard Newman - drums

Is It Mustard or Mango?

- Sam Brown - vocals, organ
- Pete Brown, Paul Bangash - guitar
- David Levy - bass
- Richard Newman - drums

Here You Are Again

- Sam Brown - vocals, piano, organ
- Pete Brown, Paul Bangash - guitar
- David Levy - bass
- Richard Newman - drums

Trick of the Imagination

- Sam Brown - vocals, piano, organ
- Pete Brown - guitar, synthesiser
- Paul Bangash - guitar
- David Levy - bass
- Richard Newman - drums

Production

- Pete Brown, Sam Brown - producers (all tracks)
- Robin Evans - recording engineer (all tracks)
- Jock Loveband - assistant engineer on "Kissing Gate"
- Stan Loubieres, Cameron Jenkins - assistant engineers on all B-sides

Other

- Mike Owen - photography
- Jeremy Pearce - design

== Charts ==
Chart (1990)	Peak position
Australia (ARIA Charts)	89
Canada (RPM)	45
Europe (Eurochart Hot 100)	57
UK Singles (OCC)	23
European Airplay (European Hit Radio)	48
Quebec (ADISQ)	3
