= April Moon =

Studio album by Sam Brown
- Released: 2 April 1990
- Genre: Pop; blue-eyed soul; soft rock; pop rock
- Length: 52:32
- Label: A&M
- Producer: Pete Brown; Sam Brown

Sam Brown chronology
Stop! (1988)	April Moon (1990)	43 Minutes (1993)

Singles from April Moon
- 1. "With a Little Love"; 2. "Kissing Gate"; 3. "Once in Your Life"; 4. "Mindworks"; 5. "As One"

April Moon is the second studio album by the English singer-songwriter Sam Brown, released on 2 April 1990 by A&M Records. The album was produced by Sam Brown, and her brother Pete Brown.

The album peaked at number 38 on the UK Albums Chart and number 30 on the Australian ARIA Charts. The album spawned three charting singles in the United Kingdom: "With a Little Love" peaked at number 44 on the UK Singles Chart; "Kissing Gate" at number 23; "Mindworks" at number 77. The album has sold over half a million copies worldwide. April Moon was certified silver by the British Phonographic Industry (BPI) on 17 October 1990.

Then-Pink Floyd member David Gilmour sang backing vocals on the track "Troubled Soul" (he had also appeared on Brown's debut album, Stop!, in 1988).

== Critical reception ==
Professional ratings
Review scores
Source	Rating
NME	7/10
Record Mirror	2/5 stars

Music & Media named it their Album of the Week, noting that "the follow-up to Brown's 1988 debut LP Stop! is a confident step into artistic maturity. Backed by a string of outstanding musicians and vocalists including Dave Gilmour and Phil Saatchi, the artist extends her soulful voice to its limits. The new material is a varied bunch of strong soul-rooted pop songs wrapped in sophisticated arrangements that will stand the test of time."

Russ Hudson of Record Mirror described April Moon as an "eclectic overview of contemporary musical modes which has resulted in a directionless album full of melodrama, 'nice' arrangements, and very little else". He noted the broad range of musicians on the album had resulted in a "lack of continuity" and added that "more originality, energy and rawness is needed [to] give Brown's impressive vocals the material they deserve".

In their review, The Canberra Times commented that "it is a couple of years since Sam Brown launched herself into the charts...if her new album, April Moon, is any indication, she has spent those two years consolidating and refining. Gone is her tendency to over-sing (yell is a blunter word for it). Her voice is now much more controlled and flows easily and confidently through a set of melodious and reasonably catchy tracks....Not a world-shattering album, but easy on the ears and gentle on the intellect."

== Track listing ==
Side one
No.	Title	Writer(s)	Length
1.	"April Moon"	Sam Brown	3:39
2.	"With a Little Love"	Margo Buchanan; S. Brown	3:46
3.	"Mindworks"	Richard Newman; S. Brown	4:07
4.	"Kissing Gate"	S. Brown; Pete Brown; Sara Jones; Tina Warrilow	3:21
5.	"Where You Are"	P. Brown; S. Brown; Pete Bangash	3:47
6.	"Contradictions"	Danny Schogger; S. Brown	4:38

Side two
No.	Title	Writer(s)	Length
7.	"Once in Your Life"	S. Brown; Gregg Sutton	4:14
8.	"Hypnotised"	P. Brown; S. Brown	4:27
9.	"As One"	S. Brown; Buchanan	2:46
10.	"Eye for an Eye"	Schogger; S. Brown	4:30
11.	"Troubled Soul"	P. Brown; Bangash; S. Brown	6:27
12.	"S'Envoler"	E. de la Lubie; S. Brown	2:57
13.	"Henry"	S. Brown; Bangash; P. Brown	3:20

Tracks on CD releases only
No.	Title	Writer(s)	Length
14.	"Pride and Joy"	Jennifer (Ian) Maidman; P. Brown; S. Brown	4:32
15.	"Now and Forever"	P. Brown; Matthew Seligman; S. Brown	4:37
16.	"The Way I Love You"	R. Shannon	2:37

== Personnel ==
Adapted from the album's liner notes.

=== Musicians ===
- Sam Brown – lead vocals (all tracks), piano (tracks 1, 3–5, 8–12, 15–16), Minimoog bass (tracks 3, 5), organ (tracks 3, 15), Hammond (tracks 4, 6, 12, 16), keyboards (track 2, 14), SH-101 (track 9), D-50 (track 10), tambourine (track 14), percussion (track 15)
- Pete Brown – guitars (tracks 1–4, 8, 10–15), bass (track 16), backing vocals (track 3, 5–6, 10, 14–16), SH-101 (track 3, 12), keyboards (track 6), percussion (track 6)
- Joe Brown – mandolin (track 2)
- Vicki Brown – backing vocals (tracks 2, 7, 13, 15)
- Jim Archer – violin (track 4)
- Paul Bangash – guitar (tracks 1–8, 10–16), backing vocals (tracks 2, 5–6, 10, 14)
- Guy Barker – piccolo trumpet (track 2)
- Mark Berrow – violin (track 4)
- Margo Buchanan – backing vocals (tracks 1, 5–6, 10, 13–15)
- Ben Cruft – violin (track 4)
- Danny Cummings – percussion (tracks 8, 10, 13)
- Martin Ditchman – percussion (tracks 2, 7)
- Mitt Gamon – harmonica (track 16)
- Will Gibson – violin (tracks 1, 5)
- David Gilmour – vocals (track 11)
- Tim Good – violin (track 4)
- Nick Ingman – MD strings (tracks 1, 4–5)
- Carol Isaacs – piano (track 15)
- Cameron Jenkins – saxophones (track 13)
- Sara Jones – backing vocals (tracks 7, 13)
- Simeon Jones – mouth organ (track 6), saxophone solo (track 13), baritone saxophone (track 13)
- Paul Kegg – cello (track 4)
- Ben Kennard – cello (track 4)
- David Levy – bass (track 4, 15)
- Helen Lichmann – cello (1, 5)
- Jon Lord – piano (track 6)
- Martin Loveday – cello (1, 5)
- Ian Maidman – bass (tracks 6, 10, 12, 14), vocals (track 10), Chapman Stick (track 8), piano (track 14), acoustic guitar (track 14)
- Chucho Merchán – double bass (track 11)
- Richard Newman – drums (tracks 1–4, 6–8, 10–16), percussion (track 5)
- Naomi Osborne – backing vocals (tracks 10, 15)
- Pete Oxer – violin (track 4)
- George Robertson – violin (1, 5)
- Phil Saatchi – backing vocals (track 1)
- Danny Schogger – piano (track 2), clarinet (track 6), keyboards (track 8)
- Matthew Seligman – bass (tracks 1–2, 7–8, 13), additional double bass (track 11)
- Paul Silverthorne – viola (track 4)
- Linda Taylor – backing vocals
- Tina Warrilow – backing vocals (tracks 7, 13)
- Chris Wellington – viola (track 4)
- John Williams – violin (track 4)
- Gavyn Wright – first violin (tracks 1, 5), violin (track 4)

=== Technical ===
- Produced by Pete Brown and Sam Brown
- Additional engineering by Pete Brown
- Recording and mixing engineer: Robin Evans
- Assistant engineer: Jock Loveband
- Management: Lisa Denton
- Photography: Mike Owen, Robert Ogilvie; assisted by Clare Hanford
- Design and art direction: Jeremy Pearce; assisted by Simon Carrington and Les Watts

== Charts ==
Chart performance for April Moon
Chart (1990)	Peak position
Australian Albums (ARIA)	30
Austrian Albums (Ö3 Austria)	29
Dutch Albums (Album Top 100)	45
European Albums (Music & Media)	83
Finnish Albums (Suomen virallinen lista)	11
German Albums (Offizielle Top 100)	34
Swedish Albums (Sverigetopplistan)	21
Swiss Albums (Schweizer Hitparade)	20
UK Albums (OCC)	38

== Certifications ==
Certifications for April Moon
Region	Certification	Certified units/sales
United Kingdom (BPI)	Silver	60,000^{^}
^{^} Shipments figures based on certification alone.
