= Box (Sam Brown album) =

Studio album by Sam Brown
- Released: 1997
- Length: 49:07
- Label: Demon Records
- Producer: Pete Brown; Sam Brown

Sam Brown chronology
43 Minutes (1993)	Box (1997)	ReBoot (2000)

Box is the fourth studio album by English singer-songwriter Sam Brown. It was released in 1997 by Demon Records.

Box peaked at No. 207 on Australia's ARIA Charts. The album's first single, "I Forgive You", peaked at No. 192 on the ARIA charts. "Whisper" was issued as a promotional single in the UK. The album sold approximately 17,000 copies.

== Reception ==
Professional ratings
Review scores
Source	Rating
AllMusic	4/5 stars

Upon release, Bob Eborall of Ealing Leader wrote: "Sam gives us the full works on a new album of across-the-range songs. Ranging from the jazzy title track to the rocking "They're the Ones", and my favourite tracks, "Embrace the Darkness" and the tender "Whisper"." Stephen Thomas Erlewine of AllMusic described the album as "arguably her best effort yet". He commented: "She's developed into a first-rate songwriter, capable of crafting melodic, memorable songs with true emotion and depth. It's mature pop with many layers and levels."

== Track listing ==
No.	Title	Writer(s)	Length
1.	"Box"	Sam Brown	3:03
2.	"Ebb and Flow"	S. Brown	3:46
3.	"Whisper"	S. Brown	4:45
4.	"I Forgive You"	S. Brown, Maria McKee	5:32
5.	"They're the Ones"	S. Brown, Pete Brown	4:52
6.	"Liberty in Reality"	S. Brown, P. Brown	3:44
7.	"Embrace the Darkness"	S. Brown	4:48
8.	"T.O.E.S."	S. Brown	4:29
9.	"Intuition"	S. Brown, P. Brown	4:55
10.	"As the Crow Flies"	S. Brown, Danny Schogger	4:24
11.	"What's the Use?"	S. Brown, P. Brown, Barry Godfrey	2:46
12.	"Bert and Flo"	S. Brown	2:03

Japanese CD bonus track
No.	Title	Writer(s)	Length
13.	"You're My World"	Carl Sigman, Gino Paoli, Umberto Bindi	3:05

== Personnel ==
- Sam Brown – lead vocals, backing vocals, piano
- Pete Brown – guitar, backing vocals
- Claire Nicolson – organ, synthesiser, backing vocals
- Aaron McRobbie – bass, backing vocals
- Richard Newman – drums
- Jim Capaldi – percussion (track 6, 10)

Production

- Pete Brown – producer, engineer
- Sam Brown – producer
- Damon Iddins, Mat Davies – engineers
