= Walking Back to Me =

Single by Sam Brown

from the album Stop!
- Released: 1988
- Recorded: 1988
- Genre: Pop rock
- Length: 3:40
- Label: A&M
- Songwriters: Sam Brown; Gregg Sutton
- Producers: Pete Brown; Sam Brown

Sam Brown singles chronology
"Walking Back to Me" (1988)	"Stop!" (1988)

Music video
- "Walking Back to Me" on YouTube

"Walking Back to Me" is a song by the English singer-songwriter Sam Brown, written by Brown, and Gregg Sutton. It appears on her debut studio album Stop! (1988).

== Critical reception ==
Upon its release, John Lee of the Huddersfield Daily Examiner picked "Walking Back to Me" as the "single of the week" and praised it as "a fabulous number, borrowing the feel of early Seventies glam-rockers Sweet". He added that it has "got to be a big hit". Jim Whiteford of the Dundee Evening Telegraph called it a "strident rocker" which shows Brown's "certainly got power in her vocal cords and some writing talent". He questioned its commercial potential, stating, "Melody is not strong enough for radio use, I fear, but, if she gets a chance to perform on TV, she could well start this debut song selling." Marcus Hodge of the Cambridge Evening News commented, "Blonde Sam tries too hard to give a sluggish song some lmife. Vaguely promising debut." Steven Wells of NME felt Brown would "do well to rid herself of the leaden rockist backing band and get with a drum machine and a sampler".

== Track listings ==
CD single – DE

1. "Walking Back to Me"
2. "Living In Your Own World"
3. "Tender Hearts"
4. "Leave It Be"

7" single – UK

1. "Walking Back to Me"
2. "Tender Hearts"

12" single – UK

- Side A
1. "Walking Back to Me"
2. "Living In Your Own World"
- Side B
1. "Tender Hearts"
2. "Leave It Be"

== Personnel ==
Credits are adapted from the album's liner notes.

- Sam Brown – lead vocals; piano
- Pete Brown – lesley guitar; backing vocals
- Paul Bangash – guitar
- Richard Newman – drums
- Jim Leverton – bass guitar
- Danny Schogger – keyboards
- Phil Saatchi – backing vocals

== Charts ==
Chart (1988)	Peak position
German Singles Chart	65
Italy Airplay (Music & Media)	20
