= Mindworks =

Single by Sam Brown

from the album April Moon
- B-side: "No Man Is an Island"
- Released: 9 July 1990
- Length: 4:10
- Label: A&M
- Songwriter(s): Sam Brown; Richard Newman
- Producer(s): Pete Brown; Sam Brown

Sam Brown singles chronology
"Once in Your Life" (1990)	"Mindworks" (1990)	"As One" (1990)

"Mindworks" is a song by English singer-songwriter Sam Brown, released on 9 July 1990 as the fourth single from her second studio album April Moon. It was written by Sam Brown and Richard Newman, and produced by Pete Brown and Sam Brown. "Mindworks" reached number 77 in the UK Singles Chart and remained in the top 100 for four weeks.

== Release ==
In addition to the standard 7-inch format, a limited edition 7-inch single was released featuring a pop-up sleeve. The 12-inch and CD formats of the single include "Feel Like Making Love", a cover of the 1975 song by English supergroup Bad Company.

== Music video ==
The song's music video was directed by Giblets, a group of directors made up of Rob MacGillivray, Mike Sumpter, Carol MacGillivray and Michael Olley.

== Critical reception ==
On its release, Tim Booth of the English rock band James, as guest reviewer for Record Mirror, stated, "Well I'm done in by that. It's a really fine song. What a shock, I actually like a Sam Brown record. That will teach me to have preconceptions." In a review of April Moon, Simon Williams of New Musical Express described the song as being "all bluesy schmaltz", with an "odd arrangement making the tune a pleasing touch harder to decipher". Marcus Hodge of the Cambridge Evening News felt the song to be a "gentle ballad where her coarse delivery detracts from the fragility of the musical backing."

== Track listing ==
7-inch single (UK, Germany and Australia) and cassette single (UK)

1. "Mindworks" – 4:10
2. "No Man Is an Island" – 4:50

12-inch single (UK) and CD single (UK and Germany)

1. "Mindworks" – 4:10
2. "The Tune with No Name" – 3:09
3. "No Man Is an Island" – 4:50
4. "Feel Like Making Love" – 5:07

== Personnel ==
Credits are adapted from the UK CD single liner notes.

"Mindworks"

- Sam Brown – vocals, piano, organ, Minimoog bass
- Pete Brown – Roland SH-101 synthesiser, acoustic guitars, backing vocals
- Paul Bangash – guitars
- Richard Newman – drums

"No Man Is an Island"

- Sam Brown – vocals, keyboards
- Pete Brown, Paul Bangash – guitar
- David Levy – bass
- Richard Newman – drums
- Doris Brendel – whistle

"The Tune with No Name"

- Sam Brown – vocals, piano
- Paul Bangash, Pete Brown – guitars
- Stan Loubières – bass
- Richard Newman – percussion, timpani

"Feel Like Making Love"

- Sam Brown – vocals, keyboards
- Pete Brown, Paul Bangash – guitar
- David Levy – bass
- Richard Newman – drums
- Doris Brendel – backing vocals

Production

- Pete Brown – producer (all tracks), additional engineering on "Mindworks" and "The Tune with No Name", mixing on "No Man Is an Island" and "Feel Like Making Love"
- Sam Brown – producer (all tracks)
- Robin Evans – recording and mixing engineer on "Mindworks" and "The Tune with No Name"
- Jock Loveband – second engineer on "Mindworks" and "The Tune with No Name", recording engineer on "No Man Is an Island" and "Feel Like Making Love"
- Sarah Ozholl – second engineer on "No Man Is an Island" and "Feel Like Making Love"

Other

- Mike Owen – photography
- Jeremy Pearce – design

== Charts ==
Chart (1990)	Peak position
UK Singles (OCC)	77
Quebec (ADISQ)	50
