= Prom at the Palace =

British classical music concert

- Commemoration concert by various artists
- Logo
- Venue: Buckingham Palace Garden, London, England
- Date: 1 June 2002
- Duration: 2 hours

The Prom at the Palace was a classical music concert held in London in 2002, in commemoration of the Golden Jubilee of Elizabeth II. It was held at Buckingham Palace Garden on 1 June 2002 and formed part of the Golden Jubilee Weekend. It was the classical equivalent of the Party at the Palace, a rock/pop music event. Its name reflects the popular season of classical concerts held at the Royal Albert Hall, The Proms. The event was broadcast by the BBC and shown in more than 40 countries. It was directed by Nicholas Kenyon.

== Event and venue ==
The concert was held in Buckingham Palace Garden as part of the Golden Jubilee celebrations. The event was touted as the greatest classical concert in Britain in many years, in part due to the quality of performers gathered on a single stage. Tickets were determined by a lottery and 3,000 telephone lines were set up to deal with the calls from applicants. Around two million applications were submitted to attend either the Party or the Prom at the Palace. Twelve thousand people attended the latter, including 125 guests in the royal box, among whom were eighteen members of the royal family.

This was the first time that the Queen had ever opened the garden up to the public and heralded similar celebrations, both during the Golden Jubilee Year of 2002 and in 2006 for her 80th birthday celebrations, which included a party for fellow octogenarians and a Children's Prom at the Palace.

== Performers ==
Orchestras at the Prom included HM Royal Marines Portsmouth, the BBC Symphony Orchestra and the BBC Symphony Chorus, and the London Adventist Chorale. The compere, Michael Parkinson, asked the audience to stand as the Queen, wearing a lime green suit, entered the Royal Box with the Duke of Edinburgh and took her place with the royal family. Individual performers included Dame Kiri Te Kanawa, Julian Bliss, Ashley Wass, Zenaida Yanowsky, Roberto Bolle, Angela Gheorghiu, Thomas Allen, Mstislav Rostropovich and Roberto Alagna.

== Concert ==
The concert was the opening of the Golden Jubilee Weekend. In Buckingham Palace Garden, 12,000 guests each sat in their seats and ate a picnic dinner. They were provided with hampers packed with champagne, smoked salmon wrap, Jubilee chicken and strawberries and cream by the palace. The performances were done on a large stage constructed specially for the event. The performances were synchronized for ballet presentations inside the Palace and broadcast to the crowds in the garden. The concert ended with "Pomp and Circumstance March No. 1", followed by the national anthem "God Save the Queen". At the end, the Queen stepped outside the palace to greet 40,000 people who were watching the event on wide screens in The Mall.

== See also ==
- Party at the Palace
- Buckingham Palace Gardens
- Buckingham Palace
