= Sam Brown (singer) =

English musician (born 1964)

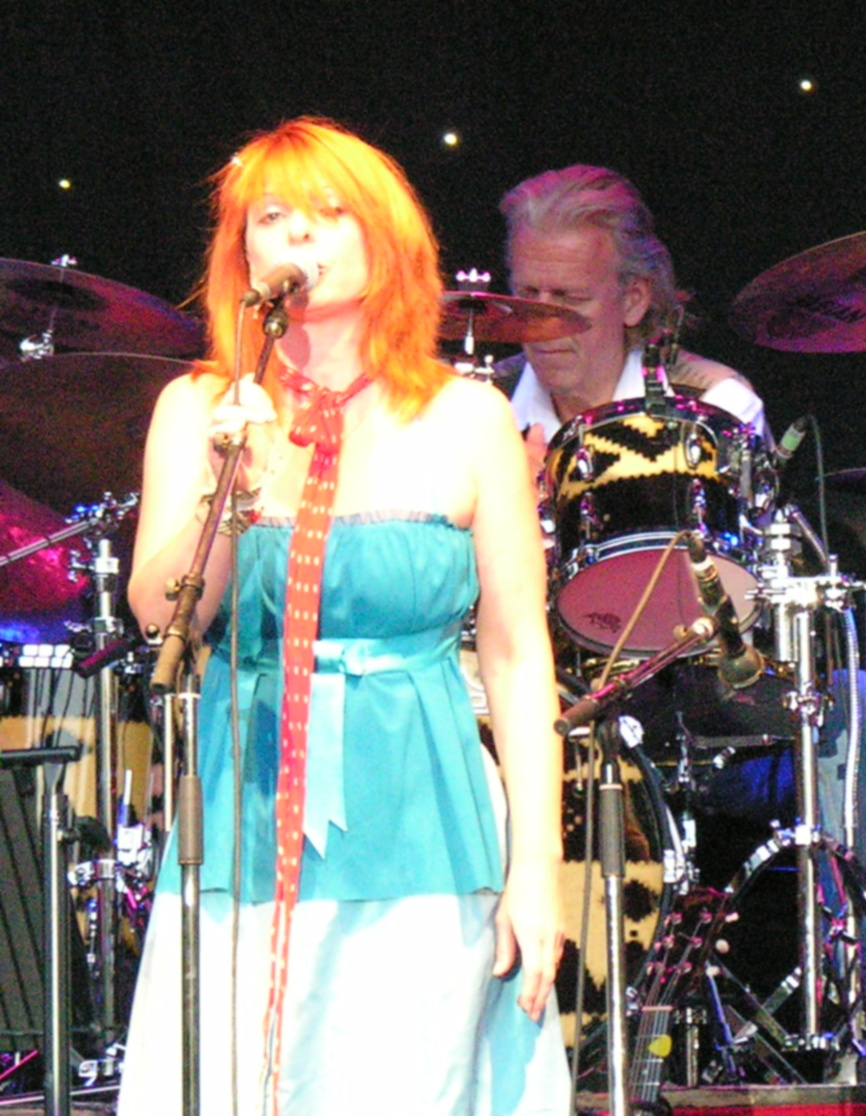
- Brown (with drummer Gilson Lavis) performing in 2006

Background information
- Born: Samantha Brown; 7 October 1964 (age 62); Stratford, Essex, England
- Genres: Blue-eyed soul; jazz; pop; soft rock
- Occupations: Singer; songwriter; musician
- Instruments: Vocals; keyboards; bass guitar; ukulele
- Years active: 1978–present
- Labels: A&M; Festival; I.R.S.; Pod Music; Dick Bros Record Company; Demon Music Group; Mud Hut
- Website: misssambrown.com

Samantha Brown (born 7 October 1964) is an English singer, songwriter and musician.

Brown is a blue-eyed soul and jazz singer, and ukulele and piano player. She came to prominence in the late 1980s as a solo artist and released eight singles that entered the UK Singles Chart during the 1980s and 1990s. Her solo singles, sometimes dealing with lost love, include "Stop!", "This Feeling", "Can I Get a Witness", "Kissing Gate", "With a Little Love" and "Just Good Friends". She worked as a session backing vocalist, working with artists such as Gary Moore, George Harrison, Small Faces, Spandau Ballet, Adam Ant, Jon Lord (of Deep Purple), Pink Floyd, David Gilmour, The Firm, Dodgy and Nick Cave.

Brown released her debut album Stop! in 1988 and in total has released seven studio albums, one live album, one EP, and three compilation albums, as well as three albums as part of the group Homespun. She developed serious problems with her singing voice in 2007 after which she stopped recording and singing live until 2023 when she released the album Number 8.

== Early years ==
Samantha Brown was born on 7 October 1964, in Stratford, east London, England. She is the daughter of musician Joe Brown and session singer Vicki Brown. Brown's first work in the music industry was in 1978 aged 14, when she sang backing vocals on the final studio album by the Small Faces, 78 in the Shade. She also worked as a backing vocalist with several other bands, including Spandau Ballet, and with her mother on former Deep Purple keyboardist Jon Lord's third solo album Before I Forget.

== Career ==
Brown signed a recording contract with A&M in 1986. Her most successful song with A&M was "Stop!", released as a single in 1988. She issued an album of the same name that same year. Other singles taken from the album included "Walking Back to Me", "This Feeling" and her cover version of "Can I Get a Witness". The album Stop! has sold over two-and-a-half million copies worldwide, doing particularly well in the UK and Australia. Brown's second studio album, April Moon (1990), included two hit singles, "Kissing Gate" and "With a Little Love". Three further singles were released from the album: "Mindworks", "Once in Your Life" and "As One".

Brown's third studio album, 43 Minutes..., was made around the same time that her mother was dying from breast cancer. A&M, Brown's record label at the time, were not satisfied with the album and wanted some potential hit singles recorded and added to the track listing. Brown, unwilling to compromise and after a protracted legal battle, bought back the master recordings of the album and released them in 1992 on her own label Pod Music, a year after the death of her mother. Few copies were initially released, but it was reissued in 2004.

Brown provided backing vocals for Pink Floyd on their 14th studio album, The Division Bell, released in 1994, and accompanied them on their tour to promote the release. Her involvement was documented on the following year's Pink Floyd release, Pulse, in which she sang backing vocals and was the first lead vocalist on the song "The Great Gig in the Sky". In 1995, she had a minor chart hit with a duet with fellow singer-songwriter Fish, entitled "Just Good Friends". In 1997, Brown returned with her fourth studio album Box, released via the independent record label Demon Music Group. Tracks on this album included "Embrace the Darkness", "Whisper" and "I Forgive You" which was co-written with Maria McKee. McKee's version of the song originally appeared on her second album, You Gotta Sin to Get Saved.

In 2000, her fifth studio album, ReBoot, was released via another independent label, Mud Hut, as was the single "In Light of All That's Gone Before." In 2003, Brown formed the band Homespun with Dave Rotheray. The group has released three albums. Brown also released several solo recordings in this period, including an EP, Ukulele and Voice. In 2004, Jon Lord released Beyond the Notes, for which she wrote almost all the lyrics. In late 2006, she undertook an extensive UK tour as special guest of her father, Joe Brown. The shows also included appearances by her brother, Pete Brown.

In 2007, seven years after her last album, Brown released Of the Moment. She also returned to the Top 10 of the UK Albums Chart in October 2007, when "Valentine Moon" was included on Jools Holland's hit album Best of Friends.

That same year she developed problems with her singing voice, and for unknown reasons has not been able to sing consistently since. In an interview in 2013 she explained that "I can't get vocal cord closure and achieve the proper pitch simultaneously. It feels like there are some muscles that aren't working." After a cyst was found on her vocal cords, she had the cyst successfully removed, but problems with her voice persisted, leaving her unable to hold a note.

Seeking alternative musical occupation, Brown started a ukulele club in 2010 and expanded to several clubs in Oxfordshire, Dorset, London and online which have continued to thrive.

In 2021 she released her only live album, Wednesday The Something of April, a recording of a one-woman show from 2004 featuring songs from across her career. Brown's first studio album in fifteen years, Number 8, was released in January 2023. It was written and recorded with long-time collaborator Danny Schogger and makes use of Melodyne software to help Brown's vocals.

=== Backing and guest vocalist ===
As well as her solo career, Brown has had a successful career as a backing vocalist and collaborator with other artists. She has worked with the band Barclay James Harvest (1984), David Gilmour (David Gilmour in Concert) and Pink Floyd, Deep Purple (In Concert with The London Symphony Orchestra), Jon Lord, The Firm, Gary Moore, George Harrison and Nick Cave. She has often appeared as a member of Jools Holland's Rhythm and Blues Orchestra and achieved further prominence with her 2002 performance at the Concert for George, which was a memorial to George Harrison on the first anniversary of his death, where she sang "Horse to the Water". This song is included in the film of the concert and in the 2018 digital album release, but not on the original 2003 album. In 2002, she was a backing vocalist at Buckingham Palace at the Golden Jubilee of Elizabeth II's concert, Party at the Palace.

In 2015, Brown started teaching backing vocals classes at the Academy of Contemporary Music (ACM) in Guildford, Surrey, a school for rock and pop musicians.

== Personal life ==
Brown has two children, born 1993 and 1995, with her ex-husband, producer and musician Robin Evans.

On 16 June 1991, Brown's mother Vicki Brown died aged 50 from breast cancer.

== Discography ==
Studio albums

- Stop! (1988)
- April Moon (1990)
- 43 Minutes... (1993)
- Box (1997)
- ReBoot (2000)
- Of the Moment (2007)
- Number 8 (2023)

Live albums

- Wednesday the Something of April (2021)

Listed chronologically, the initial letters of the titles of Brown's seven solo studio albums and one live album spell out Brown's name. Brown said that she was unaware of the pattern until it was pointed out after the release of ReBoot in 2000. Once it was brought to her attention she vowed to continue the trend, asking fans to submit suggestions for the next title beginning with 'O'. Of the Moment was released in September 2007; its title was suggested by a fan via Brown's website.

== See also ==
- List of former A&M Records artists
- List of performers on Top of the Pops
