= Stop! (Sam Brown song) =

1988 single by Sam Brown

Single by Sam Brown

from the album Stop!
- B-side: "Poor Frank"; "Blue Soldier"; "Bones"
- Released: 2 May 1988
- Studio: Power Plant (London, England)
- Genre: Blue-eyed soul; pop
- Length: 4:53
- Label: A&M
- Songwriters: Sam Brown; Gregg Sutton; Bruce Brody
- Producers: Pete Brown; Sam Brown

Sam Brown singles chronology
"Walking Back to Me" (1988)	"Stop!" (1988)	"This Feeling" (1988)

Music video
- "Stop" on YouTube

"Stop!" is a song by the English singer-songwriter Sam Brown from her debut studio album of the same name (1988). It was released in May 1988 by A&M Records, and written by Brown, Gregg Sutton and Bruce Brody. Brown also co-produced it with Pete Brown. "Stop!" reached number 52 on the UK Singles Chart when it was first released. Following its re-release on 23 January 1989, the song peaked at number four, becoming Brown's highest-charting single, and spending 12 weeks on the chart. Additionally, "Stop!" topped the charts in Belgium, Iceland, the Netherlands and Norway, while reaching the top five in Australia, Austria, Finland, France, Ireland, Luxembourg and Switzerland. The song was featured in the soundtrack to the 1992 film Bitter Moon.

== Critical reception ==
Pan-European magazine Music & Media named "Stop!" Single of the Week, complimenting "an impressive new talent whose striking debut single leaves us with no doubts about her future." They added that "her commanding vocals fare well in this emotional and powerful ballad, suitable for all types of radio formats." Adrian Thrills from NME commented, "Fair stab at an atmospheric pop noir ballad, 'Stop!' comes complete with another orchestral quartet, a tinkling ivory and some strained, pained vocals. Mildly startling, if a little studied. A Hammond organ even helps to re-create a smokily authentic '60s feel as the melodrama slowly unfolds, but the strings are the thing."

Upon the 1989 re-release, Betty Page from Record Mirror wrote, "Second time lucky, please, for Sam's powerful R&B-ish ballad (out first time last year) from her cruelly overlooked debut LP. It's a barnstormer of a vocal performance — gutsy but strangely vulnerable at the same time. What a woman. She's made it big in Europe already, so it's about time you lot out there woke up to her considerable talents." David Cavanagh of Sounds described the song as "absolutely corking" and "solid gold". He added, "Sam's obviously a sucker for Dusty Springfield and is equipped with a startlingly good voice."

== Track listings ==
- UK CD single
1. "Stop!" (edit)
2. "Blue Soldier"
- UK 7-inch single

A. "Stop!" (edit)
B. "Blue Soldier"

- UK 12-inch single

A1. "Stop!" (album version)
A2. "Poor Frank"
B1. "Blue Soldier"
B2. "Bones"

== Credits and personnel ==
Credits adapted from the liner notes of Stop!

- Sam Brown – lead vocals; string arrangements
- Jakko Jakszyk – guitar
- Gavin Harrison – drums
- Ed Poole – bass guitar
- Kevin Malpass – Hammond organ; string arrangements
- Bob Andrews – Hammond organ solo
- Andy Price – 1st violin
- Mark Walton – 2nd violin
- Kate Musker – viola
- Peter Esswood – cello
- Vicki Brown – backing vocals
- Margo Buchanan – backing vocals

== Charts ==
=== Weekly charts ===
Weekly chart performance for "Stop!"
Chart (1988–1989)	Peak position
Australia (ARIA)	4
Austria (Ö3 Austria Top 40)	3
Belgium (Ultratop 50 Flanders)	1
Canada Top Singles (RPM)	13
Europe (Eurochart Hot 100 Singles)	7
Finland (Suomen virallinen lista)	2
France (SNEP)	2
Iceland (Íslenski Listinn Topp 10)	1
Ireland (IRMA)	4
Italy Airplay (Music & Media)	3
Luxembourg (Radio Luxembourg)	4
Netherlands (Dutch Top 40)	1
Netherlands (Single Top 100)	2
New Zealand (Recorded Music NZ)	16
Norway (VG-lista)	1
Quebec (ADISQ)	1
Sweden (Sverigetopplistan)	11
Switzerland (Schweizer Hitparade)	5
UK Singles (Official Charts)	4
US Billboard Hot 100	65
US Cash Box Top 100	70
West Germany (GfK)	7

=== Year-end charts ===
1988 year-end chart performance for "Stop!"
Chart (1988)	Position
Belgium (Ultratop 50 Flanders)	3
Netherlands (Dutch Top 40)	3
Netherlands (Single Top 100)	10
Switzerland (Schweizer Hitparade)	19

1989 year-end chart performance for "Stop!"
Chart (1989)	Position
Australia (ARIA)	24
Austria (Ö3 Austria Top 40)	21
Europe (Eurochart Hot 100 Singles)	22
UK Singles (Gallup)	36
West Germany (Media Control)	39

== Certifications ==
Certifications and sales for "Stop!"
Region	Certification	Certified units/sales
Australia (ARIA)	Gold	35,000^{^}
Canada (Music Canada)	Gold	50,000^{^}
France (SNEP)	Silver	200,000^{*}
United Kingdom (BPI)	Silver	200,000^{^}
^{*} Sales figures based on certification alone.^{^} Shipments figures based on certification alone.

== Release history ==
Release dates and formats for "Stop!"
Region	Date	Format(s)	Label(s)	Ref.
United Kingdom	2 May 1988	7-inch vinyl; 12-inch vinyl	A&M	
United Kingdom (re-release)	23 January 1989	7-inch vinyl; 12-inch vinyl; CD	A&M	
Japan	21 June 1989	CD	A&M	

== Jamelia version ==
"Stop"

Single by Jamelia

from the album Bridget Jones: The Edge of Reason (The Original Soundtrack)
- A-side: "DJ"
- B-side: "Last Christmas"
- Released: 1 November 2004
- Length: 3:37
- Label: Parlophone
- Songwriters: Sam Brown; Gregg Sutton; Bruce Brody
- Producer: Jimmy Hogarth

Jamelia singles chronology
"Universal Prayer" (2004)	"DJ" / "Stop" (2004)	"Something About You" (2006)

English singer Jamelia covered "Stop!" after the makers of the 2004 film Bridget Jones: The Edge of Reason approached her to record it to illustrate an integral part of the film. Jamelia instantly accepted the offer and explained how much she was a fan of the character and of the first film. The exclamation mark at the end of the title was dropped for the Jamelia release.

"Stop" was released as a double A-side with the song "DJ" on 1 November 2004. The single peaked at number nine on the UK Singles Chart and became Jamelia's fourth consecutive top-10 entry, spending 12 weeks on the chart. It also became her fourth consecutive top-40 single in Australia, peaking at number 37.

The formats of "DJ" and "Stop" received a staggered release. On 1 November 2004, the two-track CD one was released along with the "DJ" CD release. Due to time constraints, the "Stop" music video (directed by Alex Hemming) could not be added in time to make the 1 November release date and so the CD two was released a week later on 8 November 2004. This was also the first DVD single release from Jamelia. The single release also contained a cover of Wham!'s "Last Christmas".

=== Track listings ===
- UK CD1 and European CD single
1. "DJ"
2. "Stop"
- UK CD2
1. "DJ"
2. "Stop"
3. "Last Christmas"
4. "Stop" (video)
- Australian CD single
1. "DJ"
2. "Stop"
3. "Last Christmas"

=== Charts ===
All entries charted as "DJ" / "Stop" unless otherwise noted.

==== Weekly charts ====
Weekly chart performance for "DJ" / "Stop"
Chart (2004–2005)	Peak position
Australia (ARIA)	37
Belgium (Ultratop 50 Flanders)	46
Belgium (Ultratip Bubbling Under Wallonia)	6
Germany (GfK) "Stop" only	56
Greece (IFPI)	22
Hungary (Editors' Choice Top 40) "Stop" only	38
Ireland (IRMA)	12
Scotland Singles (Official Charts)	10
Switzerland (Schweizer Hitparade)	36
UK Singles (Official Charts)	9
UK Hip Hop/R&B (Official Charts)	6

==== Year-end charts ====
Year-end chart performance for "DJ" / "Stop"
Chart (2004)	Position
UK Singles (OCC)	107

== Other versions ==
- It was covered by Polish singer Edyta Górniak in 1989, at age 16, when she gave her first public appearance on a Polish television talent show of which she won.
- It was covered by blues rocker Joe Bonamassa in 2009, who recorded a seven-minute version of the song for inclusion on his album The Ballad of John Henry.
- It was covered by Norwegian singer Ane Brun in 2005, whom released a version (as a duet with Liv Widell) on her album Duets.
- It was covered by Icelandic singer Hafdís Huld, whom recorded an a cappella version which was used for a pan-European TV commercial for Mercedes-Benz in the summer of 2008. A fully instrumented version was released as a single in Iceland on 24 October 2008 with a full iTunes release on 24 November via Red Grape.
- It was covered by Vietnamese singer Mỹ Tâm on her album 10 Years Anniversary Liveshow 2011: Mỹ Tâm Melodies of time
- It was covered by Paul Dempsey, frontman of the Australian group Something for Kate, as a bonus track on the deluxe version of the band's 2012 album Leave Your Soul to Science.
- It was covered by Italian singer Andrea Faustini in week 7 of the live show on The X Factor 2014 after ending up in the bottom two with Stevi Ritchie.
- It was covered by Four of Diamonds in the six chair challenge on The X Factor 2016.
- It was covered by Nikita Dzhigurda in the voice of Whitney Houston on "Pikabu" 2019 specially for Makhmud.
