= Margo Buchanan =

Scottish singer-songwriter

- Born: Lanark, Scotland
- Occupation: Singer-songwriter
- Instruments: Vocals; guitar; piano
- Labels: MCA; London
- Website: margobuchananmusic.com

Margo Buchanan is a Scottish singer-songwriter, composer, musician, and recording artist. In a career spanning more than 30 years, Buchanan has worked most as a session backing vocalist.

== Early years ==
Margo Buchanan was born in Lanark, Lanarkshire, Scotland. She moved to England when she was 12 years old and left school early. She worked at a number of odd jobs and started work as a musician at age 16. She lived for a while in Coventry and then moved to London. During these years, she was offered to work with the 2 Tone band The Specials on the condition that she bleached her hair blond, but she declined and regretted it.

== Music career ==
In London, Buchanan worked as a backing vocalist with artists including Deep Purple, Tina Turner, Bonnie Tyler, Shirley Bassey, Van Morrison, David Knopfler, Jools Holland, Sam Brown, David Gilmour, The Pet Shop Boys and Tracey Ullman.

Buchanan performed at the Concert for Diana held at the newly built Wembley Stadium in 2007, in honour of Diana, Princess of Wales, and at Queen Elizabeth II's Party at the Palace in 2002. She developed a teaching model called Learn to Sing in 2002. She has also worked with BBC Television on the national singing competition series Just the Two of Us.

== Discography ==
Studio album

- I Should've Done This Years Ago (2005)
