= Cutfather =

- Born: Mich Hedin Hansen; 9 April 1968 (age 58); Holbæk, Denmark
- Genres: Pop, R&B, hip hop
- Occupations: Record producer, songwriter
- Years active: 1989–present
- Formerly of: Soulshock & Cutfather; Cutfather & Joe

Mich Hedin Hansen (born 9 April 1968), known professionally as Cutfather, is a Danish music producer, songwriter, remixer and DJ based in Copenhagen. Cutfather has a studio in Njalsgade, Copenhagen.

== Career ==
Cutfather is perhaps best known for his remix of "Return of the Mack" by Mark Morrison (1996), and the song "Superstar" recorded by Christine Milton (2002) and Jamelia (2003).

Cutfather has previously worked with Joe Belmaati in the songwriting and production team Cutfather & Joe. As part of the Cutfather & Joe partnership, he wrote, produced and remixed for Peter Andre, Another Level, Damage, Lighthouse Family, Ace of Base, Westlife, Blue, Jamelia, Shayne Ward, Lee Ryan, Lemar, Blazin' Squad and Kylie Minogue.

Cutfather has also worked with Danish producer Jonas Jeberg. Together they wrote and produced for the Pussycat Dolls, Kylie Minogue, Pixie Lott, the Wanted, JLS, Jessica Mauboy, Claire Richards, and Jordin Sparks. In 2004, Cutfather received a prestigious Ivor Novello songwriting award for Best Performing song, for his composition "Superstar" by Jamelia (which he also co-produced), which was the most performed song in the United Kingdom that year.

In 2015, "Up", performed by Olly Murs featuring Demi Lovato, written and produced alongside Daniel Davidsen and Peter Wallevik, became an international hit.

== Writing and producing collaborations ==
- Cutfather produced, wrote and remixed songs with his former production partner Joe Belmaati, as Cutfather & Joe.
- Cutfather was one half of the Danish producer team Soulshock & Cutfather in partnership with Carsten Schack (a.k.a. Soulshock).
- They founded together the Danish label Soulpower Productions in 1990.
- Cutfather regularly collaborates with songwriters worldwide and many other Danish songwriters and producers, including PhD (Peter Wallevik & Daniel Heloy Davidsen), Kasper Larsen, Jacob Ubizz, Jeppe London Bilsby and E&B.

Title	Year	Artist(s)	Album	Credits	Written with or by	Produced with
"Fly Girl"	1991	Queen Latifah	Nature of a Sista'	Co-writer/producer	Dana Owens, Carsten Schack	Soulshock
"Give Me Your Love"	1991	Queen Latifah	Nature of a Sista'	Co-writer/producer	Dana Owens, Carsten Schack, Curtis Mayfield	Soulshock
"Love Again"	1991	Queen Latifah	Nature of a Sista'	Co-writer/producer	Dana Owens, Carsten Schack	Soulshock
"Bad as a Mutha"	1991	Queen Latifah	Nature of a Sista'	Co-writer/producer	Dana Owens, Carsten Schack, Curtis Mayfield	Soulshock
"All Alright Now"	1992	Patti LaBelle	Live!	Co-writer/producer	Lori Perri, Sami McKinney, Carsten Schack, Kenneth Karlin	Soulshock & Karlin
"I'm in the Mood"	1993	CeCe Peniston	Thought 'Ya Knew	Co-writer	Steven Nikolas, Brendan Sibley, Carsten Schack, Kenneth Karlin	-
"Hit by Love"	1994	CeCe Peniston	Thought 'Ya Knew	Co-writer	Steven Nikolas, Brendan Sibley, Carsten Schack, Kenneth Karlin	-
"Keep Givin' Me Your Love"	1994	CeCe Peniston	Thought 'Ya Knew	Co-writer	Steven Nikolas, Brendan Sibley, Carsten Schack, Kenneth Karlin	
"Be Alone No More" (solo / featuring Jay-Z)	1998	Another Level	Another Level	Producer	-	Joe Belmaati
"When the Lights Go Out"	1998	5ive	Five	Additional producer	-	Eliot Kennedy, Tim Lever, Mike Percy, Joe Belmaati
"It's the Things You Do"	1998	5ive	Five	Additional producer	-	Max Martin, Jake Schulze, Joe Belmaati
"Until the Time Is Through"	1998	5ive	Five	Additional producer	-	Max Martin, Jake Schulze, Joe Belmaati
"This Is What You Told Me"	1998	5ive	Five	Co-writer/producer	Ritchie Neville, Sean Conlon, Scott Robinson, Jason Brown, Richard Breen, Wayne Hector, Ali Tennant, Joseph Belmaati	Joe Belmaati
"You and I"	1998	5ive	Five	Co-writer/producer	Wayne Hector, Ali Tennant, Joseph Belmaati	Joe Belmaati
"Freak Me"	1998	Another Level	Another Level	Co-producer	-	Scott Fitzgerald, Joe Belmaati
"Cruel Summer"	1998	Ace of Base	Cruel Summer	Producer	-	Joe Belmaati
"Everytime It Rains"	1998	Ace of Base	Cruel Summer	Producer	-	Joe Belmaati
"Adventures in Paradise"	1998	Ace of Base	Cruel Summer	Co-writer/producer	Jonas Berggren, Joseph Belmaati	Joe Belmaati
"My Private Movie"	2000	Westlife	Westlife	Co-producer	Steve Kipner, David Kopatz, Jack Kugell	Joe
"See Ya"	2000	Atomic Kitten	Right Now	Additional producer	-	Engine, Pete Craigie, Joe Belmaati
"Flowers"	2000	Sweet Female Attitude	Non-album single	Producer	Mike Powell, Martin Green	
"No More"	2001	A1	The A List	Producer	Stevie Bensusen, Claudio Cueni, Lindy Robbins, Damon Sharpe	Joe Belmaati
"Good Like That"	2001	Kylie Minogue	Fever	Co-writer/producer	Joseph Belmaati, Kara Dioguardi	Joe Belmaati, Kara DioGuardi
"We Fit Together"	2001	O-Town	O-Town	Co-writer/producer	Joseph Belmaati, Remee Jackman	Joe Belmaati
"Flexin'"	2002	Blue	One Love	Co-writer/producer	David Dawood, Simon Webbe, Joseph Belmaati	Joe Belmaati
"Don't Treat Me Like a Fool"	2002	Blue	One Love	Producer	-	Joe Belmaati
"Guilty"	2003	Britney Spears	Unreleased	Co-writer/producer	Britney Spears, Joseph Belmaati, Mich Hansen, Balewa Muhammad	Cutfather & Joe
"Superstar"	2003	Christine Milton	Friday	Co-writer/producer	Remee Jackman, Joseph Belmaati	Joe Belmaati, Remee
"Whiketywhack (I Ain't Coming Back)"	2003	Christine Milton	Friday	Co-writer/producer	Remee Jackman, Joseph Belmaati	Joe Belmaati
"All Night (Back on the Inside)"	2004	Christine Milton	Friday	Co-writer/producer	Remee Jackman, Joseph Belmaati	Joe Belmaati, Remee
"Loneliness"	2004	Christine Milton	Friday	Co-writer/producer	Remee Jackman, Joseph Belmaati	Joe Belmaati
"If You Leave Me Now"	2004	Christine Milton	Friday	Producer	-	Joe Belmaati, Remee, Ali Tennant
"Addict"	2004	Christine Milton	Friday	Co-writer/producer	Ryan Shaw, Joseph Belmaati	Joe Belmaati
"No Promises"	2006	Shayne Ward	Shayne Ward	Producer	-	Joe Belmaati
"You're Not Alone"	2006	Shayne Ward	Shayne Ward	Co-writer/producer	Joseph Belmaati, Jonas Schroder, Lucas Sieber	Joe Belmaati
"Next to Me"	2006	Shayne Ward	Shayne Ward	Co-writer/producer	Joseph Belmaati, Remee Jackman, Ali Tennant	Joe Belmaati
"It's Not All About Me"	2006	3LW	Point of No Return	Co-writer/producer	Joe Belmaati, Jack Kugell, Steve Kipner	Joe Belmaati
"Like a Drug"	2007	Kylie Minogue	X	Co-writer/producer	Jonas Jeberg, Engelina Larsen, Adam Powers	Jonas Jeberg
"All I See"	2007	Kylie Minogue	X	Co-writer/producer	Jonas Jeberg, Edwin Serrano, Raymond Calhoun	Jonas Jeberg
"Rippin' up the Disco"	2007	Kylie Minogue	X	Co-writer/producer	Jonas Jeberg, Jasmine Bird	Jonas Jeberg
"Stand By Your Side"	2007	Shayne Ward	Breathless	Co-writer/producer	Remee Jackman, John Reid, Joseph Belmaati	Jonas Jeberg
"One Step at a Time"	2007	Jordin Sparks	Jordin Sparks	Co-writer/producer	Robert Nevil, Lauren Evans, Jonas Jeberg	Jonas Jeberg, Robbie Nevil
"If This Is Love"	2008	The Saturdays	Chasing Lights	Co-writer/producer	Genevieve Moyet, Ina Wroldsen, Joseph Belmaati, John Reid, Remee Jackman, Vince Clarke	Joe Belmaati
"I Hate This Part"	2008	The Pussycat Dolls	Doll Domination	Co-writer/producer	Lucas, Wayne Hector, Jonas Jeberg	Jonas Jeberg
"Burn"	2008	Jessica Mauboy	Been Waiting	Co-writer/producer	Taj Jackson, Jonas Jeberg	Jonas Jeberg
"Juliette"	2009	Shinee	Romeo EP	Co-writer	Remee Jackman, Joseph Belmaati, Jay Sean	-
"S.O.S. (Let the Music Play)"	2009	Jordin Sparks	Battlefield	Co-writer/producer	Edward Chisolm, Christopher Barbosa, Keely Hawkes, David Kopatz, Lasse Kramhoft	Pilfinger, David Kopatz
"Turn It Up"	2009	Pixie Lott	Turn It Up	Co-writer/producer	Victoria Lott, Ruth-Anne Cunningham, Jonas Jeberg	Jonas Jeberg
"Gravity"	2009	Pixie Lott	Turn It Up	Co-writer/producer	Ina Wroldsen, Jonas Jeberg, Lucas	Jonas Jeberg
"My Love"	2009	Pixie Lott	Turn It Up	Co-writer/producer	Victoria Lott, Ruth-Anne Cunningham, Jonas Jeberg	Jonas Jeberg
"Nok af Dig"	2009	Basim	Befri dig selv	Producer	-	Jonas Jeberg
"Jeg Vil Vaere Din"	2009	Basim	Befri dig selv	Producer	-	Jonas Jeberg
"Heal this Heartbreak"	2009	JLS	JLS	Co-writer/producer	Aston Merrygold, Marvin Humes, Oritse Williams, Jonathan Gill, Jonas Jeberg, Christopher Braide	Jonas Jeberg
"Black Box"	2009	Stan Walker	Introducing Stan Walker	Co-writer/producer	Lucas Secon, Wayne Hector, Jonas Jeberg	Jonas Jeberg
"Nu ABO"	2010	f(x)	Nu ABO EP	Co-writer	Jose Lopez, Thomas Troelsen, Engelina Larsen, Yoo Young-Jin	-
"Get Outta My Way"	2010	Kylie Minogue	Aphrodite	Co-writer/producer	Damon Sharpe, Daniel Heløy Davidsen, Lucas Secon, Peter Wallevik	Daniel Heløy Davidsen, Peter Wallevik, Stuart Price, Lucas, Damon Sharpe
"Go Hard or Go Home"	2010	Kylie Minogue	Aphrodite	Co-writer/producer	Daniel Heløy Davidsen, Lucas Secon, Damon Sharpe, Thomas Sardorf	Thomas Sardorf, Daniel Heløy Davidsen, Damon Sharpe, Lucas
"Heart Vacancy"	2010	The Wanted	The Wanted	Co-writer/producer	Jonas Jeberg, Lucas Secon, Wayne Hector	Jonas Jeberg
"A Good Day for Love to Die"	2010	The Wanted	The Wanted	Co-writer/producer	Maxwell George, Nathan Sykes, Siva Kaneswaran, Thomas Parker, Jay McGuiness, Sharon Vaughn, Marcus Bryant	Jonas Jeberg
"Good Ol' Fashioned Love"	2010	The Overtones	Good Ol' Fashioned Love	Co-writer	Lachie Chapman, Mike Crawshaw, Mark Franks, Darren Everest, Timmy Matley, Drew Scott, Joachim Scharup-Jansen, Jonas Jeberg, Sean Alexander	-
"Gotta Be Somebody"	2010	Shayne Ward	Obsession	Producer	-	Ray Hedges, Nigel Butler, David Kopatz
"Resuscitate Me"	2010	September	Love CPR	Co-writer/producer	Wayne Hector, Lucas Secon, Jonas Jeberg	Jonas Jeberg
"Party in My Head"	2011	September	Love CPR	Co-writer/producer	Wayne Hector, Lucas Secon, Daniel Heløy Davidsen, Peter Wallevik	Daniel Heløy Davidsen, Peter Wallevik, Lucas
"Think About It"	2011	Melanie C	The Sea	Co-writer/producer	Melanie Chrisolm, Adam Argyle, Daniel Heløy Davidsen, Peter Wallevik, Jason Gill	Davidsen, Gill
"Burn"	2011	Melanie C	The Sea	Co-writer/producer	Chrisolm, Argyle, Davidsen, Wallevik, Gill	Davidsen, Gill
"Cruel Intentions"	2011	Melanie C	Think About It EP	Co-writer/producer	Chrisolm Argyle, Davidsen, Wallevik, Gill	Davidsen, Gill
"Go Harder"	2011	JLS	Jukebox	Co-writer/producer	Aston Merrygold, Marvin Humes, Oritse Williams, Jonathan Gill, Daniel Heløy Davidsen, Jason Gill, Ali Tennant	Jason Gill
"3D"	2011	JLS	Jukebox	Co-writer/producer	Aston Merrygold, Marvin Humes, Oritse Williams, Jonathan Gill, Daniel Heløy Davidsen, Jason Gill, Damon Sharpe	Jason Gill, Damon Sharpe
"Take You Down"	2011	JLS	Jukebox	Producer	-	Jason Gill
"Love Me, Love Me"	2011	Big Time Rush	Elevate	Co-writer/producer	Kandall Schmidt, James Maslow, Carlos Pena Jr., Logan Henderson, Christopher Rojas, Ole Broderson, Kasper "Kay" Larsen	Damon Sharpe, Chris Rojas, Kay 'n' Dustry
"Let It Go"	2012	Alexandra Burke	Heartbreak on Hold	Co-writer/producer	Belle Humble, Jason Gill	Jason Gill
"This Love Will Survive"	2012	Alexandra Burke	Heartbreak on Hold	Co-writer/producer	Daniel Heløy Davidsen, Jason Gill, Sonia Clarke	Jason Gill, Daniel Heløy Davidsen
"Between the Sheets"	2012	Alexandra Burke	Heartbreak on Hold	Producer	-	Jason Gill
"Million Miles"	2014	Kylie Minogue	Kiss Me Once	Co-writer/producer	Chelcee Grimes, Daniel Heløy Davidsen, Peter Wallevik	Daniel Heløy Davidsen, Peter Wallevik
"Sexy Love"	2014	Kylie Minogue	Kiss Me Once	Co-writer/producer	Wayne Hector, Autumn Rowe, Daniel Heløy Davidsen, Peter Wallevik	Daniel Heløy Davidsen, Peter Wallevik
"Up" (featuring Demi Lovato)	2015	Olly Murs	Never Been Better	Co-writer/producer	Wayne Hector, Daniel Heløy Davidsen, Maegan Cottone, Peter Wallevik	Daniel Heløy Davidsen, Peter Wallevik, David Quinones, TommyD
"I Could Be" (with Nadine Coyle)	2015	Shane Filan	Right Here	Co-writer/producer	Shane Filan, Engelina Larsen, Kasper "Kay" Larsen, Martin Hedegaard, Sharon Vaughn	Kay
"Serious"	2015	Fleur East	Love, Sax and Flashbacks	Co-writer/producer	Daniel Heløy Davidsen, Peter Wallevik, Wayne Hector	Daniel Heløy Davidsen, Peter Wallevik
"Know Your Name"	2015	Fleur East	Love, Sax and Flashbacks	Co-writer/producer	Fleur East, Kasper "Kay" Larsen, Maegan Cottone, Tebey Ottoh	Kay
"Need Somebody"	2016	Alex Newell	Non-album single	Co-writer/producer	Brandyn Burnette, Janee Bennett, Daniel Heløy Davidsen, Peter Wallevik	Daniel Heløy Davidsen, Peter Wallevik
"False Alarm" (with Becky Hill)	2016	Matoma	Hakuna Matoma / One in a Million	Co-writer/producer	Thomas Lagergren, Rebecca Hill, Daniel Heløy Davidsen, Peter Wallevik, Kara Dioguardi, James Newman	Matoma, Daniel Heløy Davidsen, Peter Wallevik, MNEK
"Keep It Moving"	2016	Alex Newell	Non-album single	Co-writer/producer	Brandyn Burnette, Janee Bennett, Daniel Heløy Davidsen, Peter Wallevik	Daniel Heløy Davidsen, Peter Wallevik
"Unpredictable" (solo / with Louisa Johnson)	2016	Olly Murs	24 HRS	Co-writer/producer	Daniel Heløy Davidsen, Peter Wallevik, Kara Dioguardi, Iain James	Daniel Heløy Davidsen, Peter Wallevik
"Nothing Else Matters"	2016	Little Mix	Glory Days	Co-writer/producer	Daniel Heløy Davidsen, Peter Wallevik, Camille Purcell, Wayne Hector	Daniel Heløy Davidsen, Peter Wallevik, Freedo, Joe Kearns
"Rhythm Inside"	2016	Calum Scott	Only Human	Co-writer	Calum Scott, Jonathan Maguire, Corey Saunders, Kasper "Kay" Larsen	-
"Digital Love" (featuring Hailee Steinfeld)	2017	Digital Farm Animals	Non-album single	Producer	-	Digital Farm Animals, W&W, Daniel Heløy Davidsen, Peter Wallevik
"Paint Me"	2018	Mamamoo	Yellow Flower EP	Co-writer	Chelcee Grimes, Daniel Heløy Davidsen, Peter Wallevik, Kara Dioguardi	-
"Love"	2018	Kylie Minogue	Golden	Co-writer	Kylie Minogue, Autumn Rowe, Daniel Heløy Davidsen, Peter Wallevik, Wayne Hector	-
"Monday Blues"	2018	Exo-CBX	Blooming Days EP	Co-writer	Daniel Heløy Davidsen, Peter Wallevik, Iain James, Maegan Cottone	-
"Slow"	2018	Liam Payne	First Time EP	Producer	-	MdL, Sly
"Friends"	2018	Why Don't We	8 Letters	Co-writer/producer	Daniel Heløy Davidsen, Peter Wallevik, Edward Drewett, Iain James	PhD
"I Need a Night Out"	2018	Chelcee Grimes	TBA	Co-writer/producer	Chelcee Grimes, Kara DioGuardi, Daniel Heløy Davidsen, Kasper "Kay" Larsen	Daniel Heløy Davidsen, Kay
"Watch Love Die"	2018	Melo Moreno	Colours	Co-writer	Rebecca Hill, Daniel Heløy Davidsen, Peter Wallevik, Jorgen Elofsson	-
"You Don't Know Me" (with Flo Rida & Shaun Frank featuring Delaney Jane)	2018	Sigala	Brighter Days	Co-writer/producer	Bruce Fielder, Shaun Frank, Daniel Heløy Davidsen, Peter Wallevik, Janee Bennett, Tramar Dillard	Sigala, Shaun Frank, Alexander Healey
"Stupid Things"	2018	Four of Diamonds	TBA	Co-writer/producer	Daniel Heløy Davidsen, Peter Wallevik, Neil Ormandy, Oladayo Olatunji, Caroline Ailin, Diamonte Harper, Gino Borri	Daniel Heløy Davidsen, Peter Wallevik, Tre Jean-Marie
"Younger"	2018	Olly Murs	You Know I Know	Co-writer/producer	Oliver Murs, Daniel Heløy Davidsen, Peter Wallevik, Wayne Hector, Lucas Secon	Daniel Heløy Davidsen, Peter Wallevik
"Love You Better"	2018	Olly Murs	You Know I Know	Co-writer/producer	Oliver Murs, Daniel Heløy Davidsen, Peter Wallevik, Wayne Hector, Lucas Secon	Daniel Heløy Davidsen, Peter Wallevik
"Loaded Gun"	2018	Boyzone	Thank You & Goodnight	Co-writer/producer	Daniel Heløy Davidsen, Peter Wallevik, Edward Drewett, Camille Purcell	Daniel Heløy Davidsen, Peter Wallevik
"Anyone I Want to Be"	2018	Roksana Węgiel	Roksana Węgiel	Co-writer/producer	Maegan Cottone, Nathan Duvall, Peter Wallevik, Daniel Heløy Davidsen, Lanberry, Patryk Kumór	Peter Wallevik, Daniel Heløy Davidsen
"Shame on You"	2019	Claire Richards	My Wildest Dreams	Co-writer/producer	Karen Harding, Daniel Heløy Davidsen, Peter Wallevik, Chelcee Grimes	D&P, Johnny Sarde, The Collab
"365" (with Katy Perry)	2019	ZEDD	Non-album single	Co-writer/producer	Anton Zaslavski, Katheryn Hudson, Caroline Ailin, Daniel Heløy Davidsen, Peter Wallevik, Corey Sanders	ZEDD, Daniel Heløy Davidsen, Peter Wallevik
"Devil"	2019	CLC	Non-album single	Co-producer	-	Peter Wallevik, Daniel Heløy Davidsen, Phil Plested, Lauren Aquilina
"Killing Me"	2021	Chungha	Non-album single	Co-writer/producer	Musikality, Celine Svanback, Jeppe London, Sam Merrifield	Musikality, Jeppe London
"Cruel"	2021	TWICE	Formula of Love: O+T=＜3	Co-writer/producer	Jeppe London Bilsby, Brooke Tomlinson, Alma Gudmundsdottir, Lauritz Emil Christiansen	Jeppe London Bilsby, Lauritz Emil Christiansen
"Can't Control Myself"	2022	Taeyeon	INVU	Co-producer	-	Celine Svanbäck, Lauritz Emil Christiansen, Jacob Ubizz, Ryan S. Jhun
"Fabulous"	2023	Taeyeon	To. X	Co-producer	-	Rachel Kanner, Sammie Gee, Jacob Uchorczak, Oliver McEwan
"Agit"	2023	Purple Kiss	Cabin Fever	Co-producer	Dosie, Goeun, Yuki	Peter Wallevik, Daniel Davidsen, Chelcee Grimes, Kara DioGuardi
"Welcome to MY World"	2023	aespa	MY WORLD	Co-writer/producer	Ellie Suh (153/Joombas), Hyun Ji-won, Danke	Jacob Uchorczak, Celine Svanbäck, Patrizia Helander
"Hands"	2023	Kylie Minogue	Tension	Co-writer/producer	Daniel Davidsen, Kasper Larsen, Ryan Ashley	Daniel Davidsen, KayAndMusic
"Rush"	2024	TWICE	With You-th	Co-writer/producer	Chris Burton, Carl Wallevik	Carl Altino

== The X Factor in Denmark ==
On 24 September 2010, it was announced that Cutfather would replace Remee in season four of the Danish X Factor. He joined returning judge Pernille Rosendahl and former judge Thomas Blachman. Cutfather won in his first season with Sarah Skaalum Jørgensen. After completing the fifth season (his second season), Cutfather left The X Factor and was replaced by Anne Linnet.
