= Not Like Other Girls =

Studio album by S.O.A.P.
- Released: March 18, 1998 (Denmark); May 5, 1998 (US)
- Recorded: March—September 1997
- Genre: Pop, Europop
- Length: 39 mins
- Label: Sony Music; Crave Records (US)
- Producer: Remee; Holger Lagerfeldt

S.O.A.P. chronology
| Not Like Other Girls (1998) | Miracle (2000) |

Singles from Not Like Other Girls
- 1. "This Is How We Party" Released: 1997; 2. "Ladidi Ladida" Released: 1998; 3. "Stand by You" Released: 1998; 4. "Not Like Other Girls" Released: 1999

Not Like Other Girls is the debut album by S.O.A.P. It was released on 18 March 1998 in Denmark and on 5 May in the U.S., as a self-titled album on Crave Records, with a European release under Sony held around the same time. Remee wrote the lyrics for the album, which was produced by Holger Lagerfeldt. The album was certified gold in Finland and Denmark, and had sold over 15,000 copies in the US by July 1998. By August 2000, it had sold 1.5 million copies worldwide. The album's debut single was "This Is How We Party". The second single was "Ladidi Ladida", except in the US where the second single released was "Stand by You". "Stand by You" was later recorded by the UK pop group S Club 7 for their album 7.

The album won best pop album at the 1999 Danish Music Awards. Remee and Holger Lagerfeldt were also nominated for producer of the year for the album, and "Stand by You" was nominated for best radio hit.

In 2017, BuzzFeed listed the song "This Is How We Party" at No. 100 on their list of "The 101 Greatest Dance Songs of the '90s".

== Singles ==
The first single, This Is How We Party, was a worldwide success, which spent ten weeks in the top five in Denmark, reached No.1 in Sweden where it achieved gold status, and was also certified platinum in Australia, where it reached No. 7. The song found significant radio coverage in the US, it was S.O.A.P.'s biggest hit, making it into the top 10 in many countries, including Sweden, where it reached No. 1. The single is certified platinum in Australia and gold in Belgium, France, New Zealand, and Sweden. and S.O.A.P. were described in Billboard as "looking to be the biggest thing out of Denmark since Aqua." In 2017, BuzzFeed listed the song at No. 100 on their list of "The 101 Greatest Dance Songs of the '90s".

The second single was "Ladidi Ladida", reached No. 8 in New Zealand and No. 15 in Australia, where it is certified gold.

"Stand by You" was released as the third single and the US the second single. It was later recorded by the UK pop group S Club 7 for their album 7. It was nominated for best radio hit.

Released in 1999, the fourth and final single was Not Like Other Girls. The radio version was a Dave Sears remix, while the original album version was featured in Songs from Dawson's Creek, the soundtrack from the TV show Dawson's Creek.

== Track listing ==
1. "S.O.A.P. Intro"
2. "Stand by You"
3. "This Is How We Party"
4. "Romeo & Juliet"
5. "Not Like Other Girls"
6. "Who Can I Talk To"
7. "Simon Says"
8. "Ladidi Ladida"
9. "Wishing"
10. "Deep in My Heart"
11. "Dowutchalike"
12. "Live Forever"
13. "Ladidi Ladida - Part II (TNT Meets Remee)"

== Charts ==
Chart performance for Not Like Other Girls
| Chart (1998) | Peak position |
|---|---|
| Australian Albums (ARIA) | 61 |
| Danish Albums | 3 |
| Finnish Albums (Suomen virallinen lista) | 2 |
| New Zealand Albums (RMNZ) | 32 |
| Swedish Albums (Sverigetopplistan) | 40 |

== Certifications and sales ==
The album was certified gold in Finland and Denmark, and had sold over 15,000 copies in the US by July 1998. By August 2000, it had sold 1.5 million copies worldwide.

The album won best pop album at the 1999 Danish Music Awards. Remee and Holger Lagerfeldt were also nominated for producer of the year for the album, and "Stand by You" was nominated for best radio hit.

Certifications for Not Like Other Girls
| Region | Certification |
|---|---|
| Denmark | Gold |
| Finland | Gold |

== Legacy ==
Released in December 1997, This Is How We Party was S.O.A.P.'s biggest hit, making it into the top 10 in many countries, including Sweden, where it reached No. 1. The single is certified platinum in Australia and gold in Belgium, France, New Zealand, and Sweden. In 2017, BuzzFeed listed the song at No. 100 on their list of "The 101 Greatest Dance Songs of the '90s". In 2002, it was sampled in BoA's song "Tragic", and in 2019, it was sampled in a song also titled "This Is How We Party" by R3hab and Icona Pop.

S.O.A.P. were described in Billboard as "looking to be the biggest thing out of Denmark since Aqua."

The album won best pop album at the 1999 Danish Music Awards. Remee and Holger Lagerfeldt were also nominated for producer of the year for the album, and "Stand by You" was nominated for best radio hit.

Released in 1999, the fourth and final single was Not Like Other Girls. The radio version was a Dave Sears remix, while the original album version was also use in the soundtrack Songs from Dawson's Creek, from the famous TV show Dawson's Creek.
