= Ladidi Ladida =

Single by S.O.A.P.

from the album Not Like Other Girls
- B-side: "Ladidi Ladida Part II"
- Released: March 1998
- Length: 3:03
- Label: SOAP
- Songwriter: Remee Zhivago
- Producers: Remee Zhivago; Holger

S.O.A.P. singles chronology
"This Is How We Party" (1997)	"Ladidi Ladida" (1998)	"Stand by You" (1998)

"Ladidi Ladida" is a song by Danish pop music duo S.O.A.P., released as the second single from their debut album Not Like Other Girls (1998). The single reached No. 8 in New Zealand and No. 15 in Australia, where it is certified gold. The song was written by Remee Zhivago.

The song was covered by American girl group i5 in 2000 with slightly modified lyrics including more sexual innuendo. Reviewing the i5 version, William Ruhlmann from AllMusic said the song "steps over the line of double entendre with its repeated demand, 'I want to see you come,' only occasionally followed, after a lag, by 'into my life'."

== Music video ==
The music video begins with Heidi driving a Volkswagen Beetle while Saseline reads a map. "This Is How We Party" can be heard briefly as a radio is tuned to different stations. Footage of the sisters travelling is intercut with footage of them dancing on a small stage in front of a crowd of people. When the Volkswagen stalls, the girls get their bags out of the car and start walking along the road, before hitchhiking a ride in the back of a truck carrying frozen fish. Later, the girls get out of the truck and get into the back of a black station wagon. When the two men in the front of the station wagon discover a fish in the girl's belongings, they kick them out of the vehicle. The girls commence walking down the road again. A sedan containing two men with stockings over their faces is seen driving along the road. The men abandon the vehicle and flee the area. When the girls come across the vehicle, they find handguns inside. Heidi picks one up, as a police car with its lights and sirens activated drives up to the vehicle. The words "To be continued..." appear on the screen as the song ends. After the screen turns black the sound of a gun being cocked is heard.

== Track listings ==
Danish CD single

1. "Ladidi Ladida" (album version) – 3:01
2. "Ladidi Ladida Part II" (TNT meets Remee) – 3:48

Danish maxi-CD single

1. "Ladidi Ladida Part II" (TNT meets Remee) – 3:48
2. "Ladidi Ladida" (album version) – 3:01
3. "Ladidi Ladida" (TNT's extended club mix) – 5:09
4. "Ladidi Ladida" (TNT's Dirty Phunk mix) – 6:46

French CD single

1. "Ladidi Ladida" (album version) – 3:02
2. "Ladidi Ladida Part II" (TNT meets Remee) – 3:45
3. "Ladidi Ladida" (TNT's extended club mix) – 5:06

Australian CD single

1. "Ladidi Ladida" – 3:10
2. "Ladidi Ladida Part II" (TNT meets Remee) – 3:43
3. "Ladidi Ladida" (TNT's extended club mix) – 5:09
4. "Ladidi Ladida" (TNT's Dirty Phunk mix) – 6:46

Australian maxi-CD single

1. "Ladidi Ladida" (album version) – 3:10
2. "Ladidi Ladida Part II" (TNT meets Remee) – 3:43
3. "Ladidi Ladida" (TNT's extended club mix) – 5:09
4. "Ladidi Ladida" (TNT's Dirty Phunk mix) – 6:46
5. "This Is How We Party" (album version) – 3:17

== Charts ==
=== Weekly charts ===
Chart (1998–1999)	Peak position
Australia (ARIA)	15
Belgium (Ultratop 50 Wallonia)	21
France (SNEP)	28
New Zealand (Recorded Music NZ)	8
Sweden (Sverigetopplistan)	58

=== Year-end charts ===
Chart (1998)	Position
Australia (ARIA)	74

== Certifications ==
Region	Certification	Certified units/sales
Australia (ARIA)	Gold	35,000^{^}
^{^} Shipments figures based on certification alone.
