= Whiketywhack (I Ain't Coming Back) =

Single by Christine Milton

from the album Friday
- Released: 2003
- Genre: Pop
- Length: 3:03
- Label: RCA/BMG
- Songwriters: Remee, Mich Hansen, Joe Belmaati
- Producer: Cutfather & Joe

Christine Milton singles chronology
"Superstar" (2003)	"Whiketywhack (I Ain't Coming Back)" (2003)	"Shine On" (2004)

"Whiketywhack (I Ain't Coming Back)" is a song by Danish pop singer Christine Milton. It was released on 7 July 2003 as the second single from her debut album Friday.

== Track listing ==
No.	Title	Remixed by	Length
1.	"Whiketywhack (I Ain't Coming Back)" (C&J Radio Version)		3:03
2.	"Whiketywhack (I Ain't Coming Back)" (Remee & The Shack Radio Version)		3:03
3.	"Whiketywhack (I Ain't Coming Back)" (The Nightclub Mix)	The Shack	3:01
4.	"Whiketywhack (I Ain't Coming Back)" (Simon Vegas Remix)	Simon Vegas	4:43
5.	"Whiketywhack (I Ain't Coming Back)" (Instrumental)		3:03

== Credits and personnel ==
- Written by Remee, Mich Hansen, Joe Belmaati
- Producer on track 1 and 5: Cutfather & Joe for XL Talent Partnership
- Recorded by Joe Belmaati at C&J Studio, Copenhagen
- Mixed by Mads Nilsson, Cutfather & Joe at Whiteroom Studio, Copenhagen
- Percussion by Mich Hansen
- All other instruments by Joe Belmaati
- Backing vocals by Szhirley Rasmussen
- Producer, recording and mixing on track 2: Remee and The Shack at www.studioc4.dk
- Executive remix production on track 4 by emu for Gheespot Productions
- Rap and backing vocals on all tracks by Remee

== Charts ==
Chart (2003)	Peak position
Danish Singles Chart	4
