= Miracle (S.O.A.P. album) =

Studio album by S.O.A.P.
- Released: 2000
- Genre: Electronic
- Label: Sony Music Entertainment
- Producer: Remee Zhivago

S.O.A.P. chronology
Not Like Other Girls (1998)	Miracle (2000)

Miracle is the second and final album by S.O.A.P. It was released in 2000 and peaked at No. 20 in Denmark. The album's debut single, "S.O.A.P. Is in the Air", charted in Denmark and Sweden, reaching No. 3 and No. 25 respectively.

== Track listing ==
1. "S.O.A.P. Is in the Air"
2. "We Are the Good"
3. "Mr. DJ"
4. "One Love Only"
5. "Welcome to My Party"
6. "Like a Stone (In the Water)"
7. "Abracadabra"
8. "Give It All You Got"
9. "Smile at Me"
10. "Good 2 Me"
11. "I Wanna Go Back"
