= Friday (album) =

2004 album by Christine Milton

Studio album by Christine Milton
- Released: 8 April 2004
- Genre: Pop, R&B
- Label: RCA, BMG
- Producer: Cutfather & Joe, Ghost, Jensen, Larrson & Jørgensen, Remee, Ali Tennant

Singles from Friday
- 1. "Superstar" Released: 13 January 2003; 2. "Whicketywhack (I Ain't Coming Back)" Released: 2003; 3. "Shine On" Released: 2004; 4. "So Addictive" Released: 2004

Friday is the debut album by the Danish pop singer and Popstars participant Christine Milton, released on 8 April 2004. It spawned four singles, with "Superstar" being the most successful, peaking at No. 1 on the Danish Singles Chart in February 2003. It was later covered internationally by Jamelia.

== Track listing ==
No.	Title	Writer(s)	Producer(s)	Length
1.	"Shine On"	Ulf Lindström, Johan Ekhé, Ana Johnsson	Ghost	3:30
2.	"Superstar"	Remee, Joe Belmaati, Mich Hansen	Cutfather & Joe, Remee	3:35
3.	"So Addictive"	Lars H. Jensen, Johannes Jørgensen, Remee	Jensen, Larrson & Jørgensen	3:01
4.	"All Night (Back on the Inside)"	Remee, Joe Belmaati, Mich Hansen	Cutfather & Joe, Remee	3:32
5.	"Loneliness"	Remee, Joe Belmaati, Mich Hansen	Cutfather & Joe	4:21
6.	"Whiketywhack (I Ain't Coming Back)"	Remee, Joe Belmaati, Mich Hansen	Cutfather & Joe	3:06
7.	"Head in the Clouds"	Ulf Lindström, Johan Ekhé	Ghost	3:45
8.	"If You Leave Me Now"	Peter Cetera	Cutfather & Joe, Remee, Ali Tennant	3:47
9.	"Addict"	Ryan Shaw, Joe Belmaati, Mich Hansen	Cutfather & Joe	3:26
10.	"What About You"	Leif Larson, Marcus Black	Ghost	3:28
