= This Is How We Party =

1997 single by S.O.A.P.

Single by S.O.A.P.

from the album Not Like Other Girls
- Released: 15 December 1997
- Genre: Pop
- Length: 3:18
- Label: SOAP
- Songwriters: Remee, Holger Lagerfeldt
- Producer: Holger Lagerfeldt

S.O.A.P. singles chronology
"This Is How We Party" (1997)	"Ladidi Ladida" (1998)

Music video
- "This Is How We Party" on YouTube

"This Is How We Party" is the debut single of Danish pop duo S.O.A.P., written by Remee and Holger Lagerfeldt. Released in December 1997, it was S.O.A.P.'s biggest hit, making it into the top 10 in several countries, including Sweden, where it reached No. 1. The single is certified platinum in Australia and gold in Belgium, France, New Zealand, and Sweden.

In 2017, BuzzFeed listed the song at No. 100 on their list of "The 101 Greatest Dance Songs of the '90s". In 2002, it was sampled in BoA's song "Tragic", and in 2019, it was sampled in a song also titled "This Is How We Party" by R3hab and Icona Pop.

== Release and reception ==
"This Is How We Party" was first released in Denmark as a maxi-CD single on 15 December 1997. In March of the following year, two more CDs with new cover artworks were issued, followed by a four-track maxi-CD in May. The song was made available for purchase in the US on 18 March 1998 and was scheduled to debut on radio on 17 March, though it ended up being played before that date. It received significant radio coverage in the US.

Larry Flick from Billboard gave a favourable review of the song, calling it a "synth-happy pop shuffler" with "harmonized vocals" that "suits the song's 'let's have fun' tone just fine". In May 1998, another editor Michael Paoletta stated that S.O.A.P. had made an "impressive splash" in the US with the debut single. Matt Stopera and Brian Galindo from BuzzFeed said "it's basically 1998 in the form of a song." Chad Watson from The Newcastle Herald stated the song had "enough sugar to lure children and enough spice to tempt night-clubbers." Kris Teo from the Sunday Mail also gave a favourable review, calling the track "pure bubblegum" that "should have preteens singing along with thoughtless cheer."

== Music video ==
Heidi and Saseline (credited as 'Line' in the video) are seen preparing their outfits and makeup at night in their home while singing the lyrics to the song. A photograph of a young man in a black vest is seen on Heidi's mirror, and Line clutches a photo frame containing an image of the same man. Wearing bathrobes, they make phone calls before escorting their parents to the front door. Once their parents leave, they remove their robes, revealing their party attire. A crowd of people immediately comes to the house, and a party begins inside. A young man dressed in a green suit, bow tie and glasses enters the party, as does the man in Heidi and Line's photo's (portrayed by the same actor). Heidi and Line dance on stage with the man in the vest, before rejecting him for the man in the green suit. When the girl's parents return home and see the party their mother faints, though their father appears amused. The participants of the party flee the house, and Heidi and Line are seen leaving in the arms of the man in the green suit.

== Track listings ==
The S.O.A.P. samples released on the US formats consist of "Ladidi Ladida", "Wishing", "Stand by You", "Who Can I Talk To", and "Not Like Other Girls".

Danish maxi-CD single

1. "This Is How We Party" (album version) – 3:17
2. "This Is How We Party" (rap version featuring Remee) – 3:34
3. "This Is How We Party" (karaoke version) – 3:34

Danish and European CD single

1. "This Is How We Party" (album version) – 3:17
2. "This Is How We Party" (rap version featuring Remee) – 3:34

Danish maxi-CD single (1998); European 12-inch single

1. "This Is How We Party" (the Almighty Mighty mix—edit) – 3:57
2. "This Is How We Party" (the Almighty Mighty mix) – 7:34
3. "This Is How We Party" (album version) – 3:20
4. "This Is How We Party" (the Almighty dub) – 6:19

UK CD1

1. "This Is How We Party" (album version) – 3:19
2. "This Is How We Party" (Almighty club mix) – 7:37
3. "This Is How We Party" (Almighty dub mix) – 6:20

UK CD2

1. "This Is How We Party" (Almighty radio version) – 3:19
2. "This Is How We Party" (Gotta Party mix) – 3:49
3. "This Is How We Party" (Gotta Party extended mix) – 6:37
4. "This Is How We Party" (rap version featuring Remee) – 3:34

UK cassette single

1. "This Is How We Party" (album version) – 3:19
2. "This Is How We Party" (Almighty radio version) – 3:19

US CD single

1. "This Is How We Party" – 3:19
2. S.O.A.P. samples – 4:58

Australian CD single

1. "This Is How We Party" (album version)
2. "This Is How We Party" (Almighty Mighty mix)
3. "This Is How We Party" (rap version featuring Remee)
4. "This Is How We Party" (karaoke version)

== Charts ==
=== Weekly charts ===
Weekly chart performance for "This Is How We Party"
Chart (1998)	Peak position
Australia (ARIA)	7
Belgium (Ultratop 50 Flanders)	43
Belgium (Ultratop 50 Wallonia)	5
Canada Dance/Urban (RPM)	6
Denmark (IFPI)	3
Europe (Eurochart Hot 100)	21
Finland (Suomen virallinen lista)	5
France (SNEP)	4
Netherlands (Dutch Top 40)	13
Netherlands (Single Top 100)	17
New Zealand (Recorded Music NZ)	5
Norway (VG-lista)	8
Scottish Singles Sales (Official Charts)	37
Sweden (Sverigetopplistan)	1
UK Singles (Official Charts)	36
US Billboard Hot 100	51
US Mainstream Top 40 (Billboard)	21

=== Year-end charts ===
Year-end chart performance for "This Is How We Party"
Chart (1998)	Position
Australia (ARIA)	35
Belgium (Ultratop 50 Wallonia)	31
Europe (Eurochart Hot 100)	52
Europe Border Breakers (Music & Media)	30
France (SNEP)	19
Netherlands (Dutch Top 40)	105
New Zealand (RIANZ)	27
Sweden (Hitlistan)	32
US Mainstream Top 40 (Billboard)	99

== Certifications ==
Certifications and sales for "This Is How We Party"
Region	Certification	Certified units/sales
Australia (ARIA)	Platinum	70,000^{^}
Belgium (BRMA)	Gold	25,000^{*}
France (SNEP)	Gold	250,000^{*}
New Zealand (RMNZ)	Gold	5,000^{*}
Sweden (GLF)	Gold	15,000^{^}
^{*} Sales figures based on certification alone.^{^} Shipments figures based on certification alone.

== Release history ==
Release dates and formats for "This Is How We Party"
Region	Date	Format(s)	Label(s)	Ref.
Denmark	15 December 1997	Maxi-CD	SOAP	
Denmark	March 1998	Maxi-CD (new cover); CD	SOAP	
United States	17 March 1998	Rhythmic contemporary; contemporary hit radio	Crave	
United States	18 March 1998	CD; cassette	Crave	
Denmark	May 1998	Maxi-CD	SOAP	
United Kingdom	13 July 1998	CD; cassette	Columbia	
