= List of Europop artists =

Europop refers to a style of pop music that originated in Europe and is generally more dance oriented than American pop. The style originated in the late 1960s and topped the charts throughout the, 1970s, 1980s and 1990s.

== List of Europop artists ==
- ABBA
- Ace of Base
- Army of Lovers
- Modern Talking
- Mónica Naranjo
- Nek
- Robyn
- Roxette
- S.O.A.P.
- A Touch of Class (ATC)
