= Juice (Danish group) =

Danish R&B group

- Origin: Denmark
- Genres: R&B, pop
- Years active: 1995–2000
- Labels: EMI-Medley
- Past members: Anne Rani; Lena Tahara; Maria Hamer; Eve Horne

Juice was a Danish R&B musical group that was established in 1995 and included Anne Rani, Lena Tahara and Maria Hamer (a.k.a. Maria Hamer-Jensen). They were signed to EMI-Medley. Lena Tahara left in 1998 and was replaced by Eve Horne. The group's producers included Carsten Soulshock, Peter Biker and Kenneth Karlin. The group disbanded in August 2000 after two successful albums.

The group became very prominent particularly with their debut album Something to Feel which sold 40,000 copies in 1997. Singles included "Best Days" and "I'll Come Runnin'" which charted on the Danish Singles Chart and also the UK Singles Chart at numbers 28 and 48, respectively.

In 1999, the group released their second album Can We Get Personal?. They also took part in the Christmas hit "Let Love Be Love" alongside S.O.A.P., Christina Undhjem and Remee. It reached No. 16 in the Danish charts.

== Former members ==
- Anne Rani (1995–2000)
- Lena Tahara (1995–1998)
- Maria Hamer (1995–2000)
- Eve Horne (1998–2000)

== Discography ==
=== Albums ===
- 1997: Something to Feel
- 1999: Can We Get Personal?

=== Singles ===
- 1997: "I'll Come Runnin'"
- 1998: "Best Days"
- 1999: "Let Love Be Love" (S.O.A.P., Juice, Christina featuring Remee)
- 1999: "Not in Love"
- 2000: "My Love"
- 2018: "Stay"
- 2019: "Indestructible"
