= Shine On (Christine Milton song) =

Single by Christine Milton

from the album Friday
- B-side: "So Addictive"
- Released: 2004
- Genre: Pop
- Length: 3:26
- Label: RCA/BMG
- Songwriters: Ulf Lindström, Johan Ekhé, Ana Johnsson
- Producer: Ghost

Christine Milton singles chronology
"Whicketywhack (I Ain't Coming Back)" (2003)	"Shine On" (2004)	"So Addictive" (2004)

"Shine On" is a song by Danish pop singer Christine Milton. It was released on 29 March 2004 as the third single from her debut album Friday.

== Track listing ==
1. "Shine On" (Single Version) – 3:26
2. "Shine On" (Extended) – 6:29
3. "Shine On" (Instrumental) – 3:26
4. "So Addictive" – 3:01

== Credits and personnel ==
- Writers: Ulf Lindström, Johan Ekhé, Ana Johnsson
- Producer, arrangement, recording and mixing: Ghost
- Vocals: Christine Milton
- Instruments: Ghost
- Backing vocals: Szhirley, Christina Undhjem
- Mastering: Björn Engelmann

== Charts ==
Chart (2003)	Peak position
Danish Singles Chart	8
