= INVU (album) =

- Digital cover

Studio album by Taeyeon
- Released: February 14, 2022
- Studios: SM (Seoul); MonoTree (Seoul); Doobdoob (Seoul)
- Genres: K-ballad; dance; pop
- Length: 42:19
- Language: Korean
- Labels: SM; Dreamus

Taeyeon chronology
What Do I Call You (2020)	INVU (2022)	To. X (2023)

Singles from INVU
- 1. "Can't Control Myself" Released: January 17, 2022; 2. "INVU" Released: February 14, 2022

INVU (/aɪ ɛn viː juː/) is the third studio album by South Korean singer Taeyeon. The album was released by SM Entertainment on February 14, 2022, and contains thirteen tracks, including the 2021 standalone single "Weekend", the pre-release single "Can't Control Myself", and the lead single of the same name, the former duo charted at top 10 and the latter debuted atop the Gaon Digital Chart.

== Background and release ==
On January 11, 2022, SM Entertainment announced that Taeyeon would pre-release a digital single titled "Can't Control Myself" on January 17 prior to the release of her third studio album in February 2022. On January 26, the name of the third studio album was announced as INVU and would be released on February 14 and consists of thirteen tracks, with pre-orders starting on the same day. Three days later, the promotional schedule was released. On February 3, the mood sampler video was released with "INVU" announced as the lead single. On February 4, it was announced that an exhibition titled "INVU: The Exhibit" would be held in Seoul from February 7–14 to commemorate the release of the album where attendees "can appreciate the concept of the album". On the same day, SM announced that the highlight video teaser scheduled for release from February 4–10 has been cancelled due to production issues. On February 8, the track listing was released. On February 13, the music video teaser for "INVU" was released.

== Composition ==
INVU consists of thirteen tracks and incorporates various genres of ballad, dance, and pop. The lead single "INVU" was described as a house and pop dance song that has "soft and dreamy synth sound", "impressive flute melody in the chorus", "vocals that deeply express the various emotions contained in the song", and "splendid high notes [that] emphasize the lyrics [of the song]". The second track "Some Nights" was described as a R&B ballad song with "dreamy vocals harmonized by gentle guitar and piano performances", including samples of the Edvard Grieg's arrangement "Solveig's Song (Solvejgs sang)" from Peer Gynt, Op. 23. The third track "Can't Control Myself" was described as a rock, garage rock, and pop-punk ballad love song that "stimulates emotions with intense sound" with lyrics about "the dangerous love that has lost control" and "[the person] still longs for the other person's heart despite the intuition that they will be hurt". The fourth track "Set Myself On Fire" was described as a pop song characterized by "vintage guitar performance that stimulates emotions" with lyrics about "the denial of reality after seeing couples saying farewell to each other" from Taeyeon's POV.

The fifth track "Toddler" was described as a pop dance song with "exciting bass performance that flow in harmony with the disco rhythm". The sixth track "Siren" was described as a medium-tempo pop ballad song with "attractive sense of speed for the chorus an dreamy synth sound" with lyrics about "luring the person in love to the ruin" and based on the "motif of Siren in Greek and Roman mythology". The seventh track "Cold As Hell" was described as an up-tempo pop song with "a bright and cheerful rhythm" and "catchy chorus that is repeated like a spell" with lyrics about "the heartbreaking and regretful loss of a person, who gave up everything for love". The eighth track "Timeless" was described as a "nostalgia" synth-pop dance song with "retro vibe and rhythm".

The ninth track "Heart" was described a pop ballad song that "starts with a minimalist focus on the guitar before progressing to an intense distortion bass and piano". The tenth track "No Love Again" was described as an "up-tempo" pop song with an "upbeat guitar performance and drum sound that provides a danceable atmosphere" with lyrics about "containing the feelings of not wanting to fall in love anymore due to ending up getting hurt anytime despite the anticipation of starting a relationship". The eleventh track "You Better Not" was described as a song that changes between "the eerie feeling of organ, violin, and vocal harmony" and the "strong 808 bass break" with lyrics containing a "message [about] a person who remains a desolate space as [they] cannot accept the parting". The twelfth track "Weekend" was described as a disco and city pop song characterized by guitar and retro synth sounds with lyrics about "wanting to freely go on a trip during the weekend". The last track "Ending Credits" was described as a medium-tempo pop song that "heightens emotions with deep sense of impact" characterized by "powerful drum sound", "multiple layers of synthesizer", and "[Taeyeon's] emotional vocals".

== Critical reception ==
Professional ratings
Review scores
Source	Rating
IZM	3.5/5 stars
NME	5/5 stars

Time chose INVU as one of "The Best K-pop Albums of 2022 So Far", with contributor Kat Moon acclaiming that "Taeyeon takes the listener on an intimate journey through the complex emotions of being in love with INVU". Rain Tears from Korean online magazine Idology found INVU as "an exemplary case of a full album that draws a long narrative, and it will become a milestone in Taeyeon's discography". While critics Squib spoke of it as "the merits of her first album My Voice, which transmits her voice through prisms of various genres, and her second album Purpose, which meticulously depicts the devastating monodrama throughout the album". Meanwhile, critics Mano praised her impressive vocal and described the album as "tenacity, even hysterical, or highly sensitive (all in a good sense)"

Jung Soo-min of IZM called INVU "a rich and elegant moonlight" in which "contains emotional changes and personal maturity under an organic and dense design from the beginning to the end". While Tanu I. Raj of NME complimented Taeyeon's approach to the topic "love" and her experience of love, "with a consuming self-awareness about her goals, ambitions and shortcomings" in which "to every emotion related, she imparts a mysticism that immediately arrests". He concluded that the album is "the story on this particular one might have been heartbreaking and soul-crushing, but there certainly will be another chapter – hopefully, a brighter, more loving one. Till then, we'll all nurse our bitter hearts and envy the ones who have it all".

In the 2022 year-end listicles, INVU was named as one of the best K-pop Albums of the Year by IZM, and Nylon. Time named INVU as one of the five best Korean Albums of the Year. NME named it as the seventh best Asian Albums of the Year.

Listicles for INVU
Publisher	Listicle	Rank	Ref.
Idology	Closing 2022: 20 Albums of the Year	Included	
IZM	2022 K-Pop Album of the Year	Included	
NME	The 25 Best Asian Albums of 2022	7	
Nylon	The 20 Best K-Pop Releases of 2022	Included	
Paste	The 30 Greatest K-Pop Albums of All Time	9	
Time	The Best K-Pop Songs and Albums of 2022	Included	

== Accolades ==
Awards and nominations for INVU
Award ceremony	Year	Category	Result	Ref.
Genie Music Awards	2022	Album of the Year	Nominated	
Korean Music Awards	2023	Best K-pop Album	Nominated	
MAMA Awards	2022	Album of the Year	Nominated	
Melon Music Awards	2022	Album of the Year	Nominated	

== Commercial performance ==
INVU debuted at number two on South Korea's Gaon Album Chart in the chart issue dated February 13–19, 2022; on the monthly chart, the album debuted number four in the chart issue for February 2022 with 129,783 copies sold. On the Billboard Japan Hot Albums, the album debuted at number 47 in the chart issue dated February 16, 2022, ascending to number 21 in the chart issue dated March 16, 2022. The album also debuted at number 38 on Japan's Oricon Albums Chart in the chart issue dated March 7, 2022, ascending to number 18 in the chart issue dated March 21, 2022. In the United Kingdom, the album debuted at position 70 on the OCC's UK Digital Albums in the chart issue dated February 18–24, 2022. In the United States, the album debuted at position 20 on the Billboard Heatseekers Albums in the chart issue dated February 26, 2022.

== Promotion ==
Prior to the album's release, on February 14, 2022, Taeyeon held a live event called "Taeyeon INVU Countdown Live" on YouTube to introduce the album and communicate with her fans.

== Track listing ==
Track listing for INVU
No.	Title	Lyrics	Music	Arrangement	Length
1.	"INVU"	Jinli (Full8loom)	Peter Wallevik; Daniel Davidsen; Rachel Furner; Jess Morgan	PhD	3:24
2.	"Some Nights" (Korean: 그런 밤; RR: Geureon Bam)	Kim Eana	Edvard Grieg; Simon Petrén; Andreas Öberg	Simon Petrén	3:27
3.	"Can't Control Myself"	Taeyeon; Moon Seol-ri	Celine Svanback; Lauritz Emil Christiansen; Mich Hansen; Jacob Ubizz; Ryan Jhun	Lauritz Emil Christiansen; Jacob Ubizz; Ryan Jhun	3:01
4.	"Set Myself on Fire"	Kenzie	Alna Hofmeyr; Michael Dunaief; Ryland Holland; Hamid Bashir	Stryv	2:37
5.	"Toddler" (Korean: 어른아이; RR: Eoreun-ai; lit. 'Adults and Children')	Kang Eun-jung; Aeon	Salem Ilese; William Leong	William Leong	3:08
6.	"Siren"	Mok Ji-min (lalala Studio)	Mike Daley; Mitchell Owens; Rodnae 'Chikk' Bell; Nicole 'Kole' Cohen	Mike Daley; Mitchell Owens	3:09
7.	"Cold as Hell"	Cha Yu-bin	Lara Andersson; Manon van Dijk; Amanda Cygnaeus; Marcus van Wattum	Nova Blue; Marcus van Wattum; Kasperi A. Pitkanen	2:44
8.	"Timeless"	Jo Yoon-kyung	Alida Garpestad Peck; Sean Fischer; Ben Samama	Sean Fischer	3:22
9.	"Heart" (Korean: 품; RR: Pum)	Lee Yi-jin (153/Joombas)	Cameron Warren; Connie Talbot; Ryan Jhun	Cameron Warren; Ryan Jhun	3:52
10.	"No Love Again"	Kang Eun-jung	Alma Guðmundsdóttir; Alida Garpestad Peck; Marc Sibley; Nathan Cunningham	Space Primates	3:14
11.	"You Better Not"	Moon Seol-ri	Celine Svanbäck; Hilda Stenmalm; Jeppe London Bilsby; Ryan Jhun	Jeppe London Bilsby; Ryan Jhun	2:43
12.	"Weekend"	Hwang Yu-bin	RoseInPeace; Saimon; Willemijn van der Neut; Marcia "Misha" Sondeijker	RoseInPeace; Saimon	3:53
13.	"Ending Credits"	Ji Ye-won (153/Joombas)	Mich Hansen; Jeppe London Bilsby; Celine Svanbäck; Sam Merrifield	Mich Hansen; Jeppe London Bilsby	3:45
Total length:					42:19

== Credits and personnel ==
Credits adapted from album's liner notes.

Studio

- SM Big Shot Studio – recording (track 1), mixing (track 8, 10)
- MonoTree Studio – recording (track 2, 12)
- SM LVYIN Studio – recording (track 3, 4, 9, 13), digital editing (track 3, 9–10, 12), engineered for mix (track 3, 13), mixing (track 9, 13)
- Doobdoob Studio – recording, digital editing (track 5)
- SM Starlight Studio – recording (track 6, 10–11), digital editing (track 1, 2, 6, 8, 11, 13), engineered for mix (track 1)
- SM SSAM Studio – recording (track 7), digital editing (track 4, 7, 12), engineered for mix (track 4–6, 10, 12)
- SM Yellow Tail Studio – recording (track 8, 11–12), digital editing (track 12), engineered for mix (track 2)
- SM Blue Cup Studio – mixing (track 1, 4, 6, 12)
- SM Blue Ocean Studio – mixing (track 2, 3, 7)
- SM Concert Hall Studio – mixing (track 5, 11)
- 821 Sound Mastering – mastering (all tracks)

Personnel

- SM Entertainment – executive producer
- Lee Soo-man – producer
- Yoo Young-jin – Music and sound director
- Taeyeon – vocals (all tracks), background vocals (all tracks), lyrics (track 3)
- Rachel Furner – background vocals, composition (track 1)
- Kwon Ae-jin – background vocals (track 2, 12)
- Maja Keuc – background vocals (track 2)
- Alna Hofmeyr – background vocals, lyrics (track 4)
- Salem Ilese – background vocals, composition (track 5)
- Amanda Cygnaeus – background vocals, composition (track 7)
- Willemijn van der Neut – background vocals, composition (track 12)
- Jinli (Full8loom) – lyrics (track 1)
- Kim Eana – lyrics (track 2)
- Moon Seol-ri – lyrics (track 3, 11)
- Kenzie – lyrics, vocal directing (track 4)
- Kang Eun-jung – lyrics (track 5, 9)
- Aeon – lyrics (track 5)
- Mok Ji-min (lalala Studio) – lyrics (track 6)
- Cha Yu-bin – lyrics (track 7)
- Jo Yoon-kyung – lyrics (track 8)
- Lee Yi-jin (153/Joombas) – lyrics (track 9)
- Hwang Yu-bin – lyrics (track 12)
- Ji Ye-won (153/Joombas) – lyrics (track 13)
- Peter Wallevik (PhD) – composition, arrangement (track 1)
- Daniel Davidsen (PhD) – composition, arrangement (track 1)
- Jess Morgan – composition (track 1)
- Edvard Grieg – composition (track 2)
- Simon Petrén – composition, arrangement (track 2)
- Andreas Öberg – composition (track 2)
- Celine Svanback – composition (track 3, 11, 13)
- Lauritz Emil Christiansen – composition, arrangement (track 3)
- Mich Hansen – composition (track 3, 13), arrangement (track 13)
- Jacob Ubizz – composition, arrangement (track 3)
- Ryan Jhun – composition, arrangement (track 3, 9, 11)
- Michael Dunaief – composition (track 4)
- Ryland Holland – composition (track 4)
- Hamid Bashir a.k.a. Stryv – composition, arrangement (track 4)
- William Leong – composition, arrangement (track 5)
- Mike Daley – composition, arrangement (track 6)
- Mitchell Owens – composition, arrangement (track 6)
- Rodnae 'Chikk' Bell – composition (track 6)
- Nicole 'Kole' Cohen – composition (track 6)
- Lara Andersson – composition (track 7)
- Manon van Dijk a.k.a. Nova Blue – composition (track 7)
- Marcus van Wattum – composition, arrangement (track 7)
- Alida Garpestad Peck – composition (track 8)
- Sean Fischer – composition, arrangement (track 8)
- Ben Samama – composition (track 8)
- Cameron Warren – composition, arrangement (track 9)
- Connie Talbot – composition track 9)
- Alma Guðmundsdóttir – composition (track 10)
- Alida Garpestad Peck – composition (track 10)
- Marc Sibley (Space Primates) – composition, arrangement (track 10)
- Nathan Cunningham (Space Primates) – composition, arrangement (track 10)
- Hilda Stenmalm – composition (track 11)
- Jeppe London Bilsby – composition, arrangement (track 11, 13)
- RoseInPeace (Lee Sang-hyun) – composition, arrangement, drums, bass (track 12)
- Saimon (Lee Seol-min) – composition, arrangement, guitar, keyboard (track 12)
- Marcia "Misha" Sondeijker – composition (track 12)
- Sam Merrifield – composition (track 13)
- Kasperi A. Pitkanen – arrangement track 7)
- Lee Min-kyu – recording (track 1), mixing (track 8, 10)
- Kang Sun-young – recording (track 2, 12)
- Lee Ji-hong – recording (track 3–4, 9, 13), digital editing (track 3, 9–10), engineered for mix (track 3, 13), mixing (track 9, 13)
- Jang Woo-young – recording (track 5), digital editing (track 5)
- Jeong Yoo-ra – recording (track 6, 10–11), digital editing (track 1, 2, 6, 8, 11, 13), engineered for mix (track 1)
- Kang Eun-ji – recording (track 7), digital editing (track 4, 7, 12), engineered for mix (track 4–6, 10, 12)
- Noh Min-ji – recording (track 8–9, 11–12), digital editing (track 12), engineered for mix (track 2)
- Lee Joo-hyung – vocal directing (track 1, 2, 5–9, 11, 13), Pro Tools (track 1, 5–9, 11, 13)
- minGtion – vocal directing (track 3)
- G-high – vocal directing (track 10, 12), Pro Tools (track 10, 12)
- Jung Eui-seok – mixing (track 1, 4, 6, 12)
- Kim Cheol-sun – mixing (track 2, 3, 7)
- Nam Koong-jin – mixing (track 5, 11)
- Kwon Nam-woo – mastering (all tracks)

== Charts ==
=== Weekly charts ===
Weekly chart performance
Chart (2022)	Peak position
Australian Digital Albums (ARIA)	18
Japanese Albums (Oricon)	18
Japanese Hot Albums (Billboard Japan)	21
South Korean Albums (Gaon)	2
UK Digital Albums (OCC)	70
US Heatseekers Albums (Billboard)	20

=== Monthly charts ===
Monthly chart performance
Chart (2022)	Peak position
South Korean Albums (Gaon)	4

=== Year-end chart ===
Year-end chart performance
Chart (2022)	Peak position
South Korea Albums (Circle)	76

== Sales ==
Overall sales for INVU
Region	Sales amount
Japan	2,555
South Korea	248,325

== Release history ==
Release history for INVU
Region	Date	Format	Label
South Korea	February 14, 2022	CD; cassette	SM; Dreamus
Various	February 14, 2022	Digital download; streaming	SM; Dreamus
South Korea	December 31, 2022	LP	SM; Dreamus
