= Can't Control Myself (Taeyeon song) =

Single by Taeyeon

from the album INVU
- Language: Korean
- Released: January 17, 2022
- Studio: SM LVYIN Studio; SM Blue Ocean Studio
- Genre: Pop punk; garage rock; rock
- Length: 3:01
- Label: SM; Dreamus
- Composers: Celine Svanbäck; Mich Hansen; Lauritz Emil Christiansen; Jacob Ubizz; Ryan Jhun
- Lyricists: Taeyeon; Moon Seol-ri

Taeyeon singles chronology
"Little Garden" (2021)	"Can't Control Myself" (2022)	"INVU" (2022)

Music video
- "Can't Control Myself" on YouTube

Professional ratings
Review scores
Source	Rating
IZM	2.5/5 stars

"Can't Control Myself" is a song recorded by South Korean singer Taeyeon for her third studio album INVU. It was released on January 17, 2022, by SM Entertainment as a pre-release single from the album. The song is written by Taeyeon with Moon Seol-ri, composed by Celine Svanbäck, and Mich Hansen, alongside Lauritz Emil Christiansen, Jacob Ubizz, and Ryan Jhun, whom also arranged the song.

== Background and release ==
On January 11, 2022, SM Entertainment announced that Taeyeon will be pre-releasing a digital single titled "Can't Control Myself" prior to the release of a new third studio album in February 2022. On January 15, the music video teaser was released. On January 17, the song along with the video was released. On January 26, the name of the third studio album was announced as INVU and was released on February 14.

== Composition ==
"Can't Control Myself" was written by Taeyeon alongside Moon Seol-ri, composed by Lauritz Emil Christiansen, Jacob Ubizz, Ryan Jhun, Celine Svanback, and Mich Hansen, and arranged by Lauritz Emil Christiansen, Jacob Ubizz, Ryan Jhun. Musically, the song is described as a rock, garage rock, and pop punk ballad love song that "stimulates emotions with intense sound" with lyrics about "the dangerous love that has lost control" and "[the person] still longs for the other person's heart despite the intuition that they will be hurt". The song opens with "breathy guitar riffs layered over Taeyeon's 'emotive' vocalizations" with the chorus featuring "heartfelt punchy guitar riffs and rich bass sounds". "Can't Control Myself" was composed in the key of E major, with a tempo of 85 beats per minute.

== Music video ==
A scene in the music video, where Taeyeon is seen covered in scratches, standing in front of the bathroom mirror wiping blood off of her face.

The music video directed by Shin Hee-won was released alongside the song by SM Entertainment on January 17. The theatre-themed music video portrays Taeyeon and her love interest playing the role of lovers. It starts with the singer covered in scratches, standing in front of the bathroom mirror wiping blood off of her face. In the music video, Taeyeon "struggles to let go of a painful relationship as she rewinds and idealises past memories as part of a fictional play. The lines between her imagined and true selves begin to blur, and her unhappiness begins to show on stage with the singer breaking down in tears and having full-blown emotional breakdowns in front of the audience and cameras."

== Commercial performance ==
"Can't Control Myself" debuted at position nine on South Korea's Gaon Digital Chart on the chart issue dated January 16–22, 2022, ascending to position eight on the chart issue dated February 6–12, 2022. The song also debuted at positions 2, 19, and 11 on the Gaon Download Chart, Gaon Streaming Chart, and Gaon BGM Chart, respectively, on the charts dated January 16–22, 2022. The song ascended to position 12 on the Gaon Streaming Chart the following week. On the Billboard K-pop Hot 100, the song debuted at position 59 on the chart issue dated January 29, 2022, ascending to nine the following week. In Singapore, the song debuted at position 18 on the RIAS Top Regional Chart on the chart issue dated January 14–20, 2022, ascending to position 17 the following week. In Vietnam, the song debuted at position 27 on the Billboard Vietnam Hot 100 for the chart issue dated January 27, 2022. The song also debuted at position 13 on the US Billboard World Digital Song Sales on the chart issue dated January 29, 2022.

== Promotion ==
To promote the song, the music video was screened as a 30-seconds advertisement at 87 Megabox movie theaters in South Korea (excluding boutiques) for about a month from January 18, 2022.

== Accolades ==
"Can't Control Myself" was nominated for Artist of the Year – Global Digital Music (January) at the 12th Circle Chart Music Awards. It also received a Melon Weekly Popularity Award on February 21, 2022.

== Credits and personnel ==
Credits adapted from liner notes of INVU.

Studio

- SM LVYIN Studio – recording, digital editing, engineered for mix
- SM Blue Ocean Studio – mixing
- 821 Sound Mastering – mastering

Personnel

- SM Entertainment – executive producer
- Lee Soo-man – producer
- Yoo Young-jin – music and sound supervisor
- Taeyeon – vocals, background vocals, lyrics
- Moon Seol-ri – lyrics
- Celine Svanback – composition
- Lauritz Emil Christiansen – composition, arrangement
- Mich Hansen – composition
- Jacob Ubizz – composition, arrangement
- Ryan Jhun – composition, arrangement
- Lee Ji-hong – recording, digital editing, engineered for mix
- minGtion – vocal directing
- Kim Cheol-soon – mixing
- Kwon Nam-woo - mastering

== Charts ==
=== Weekly charts ===
Weekly chart performance
Chart (2022)	Peak position
Singapore (RIAS Regional)	17
South Korea (Gaon)	8
South Korea (K-pop Hot 100)	9
US World Digital Songs (Billboard)	13
Vietnam (Vietnam Hot 100)	27

=== Monthly charts ===
Monthly chart performance
Chart (February 2022)	Peak position
South Korea (Gaon)	13

=== Year-end chart ===
Year-end chart performance
Chart (2022)	Peak position
South Korea (Circle)	100

== Release history ==
Release dates and formats
Region	Date	Format	Label
Various	January 17, 2022	Digital download; streaming	SM; Dreamus
