= Tye Morgan =

English singer (born 1992)

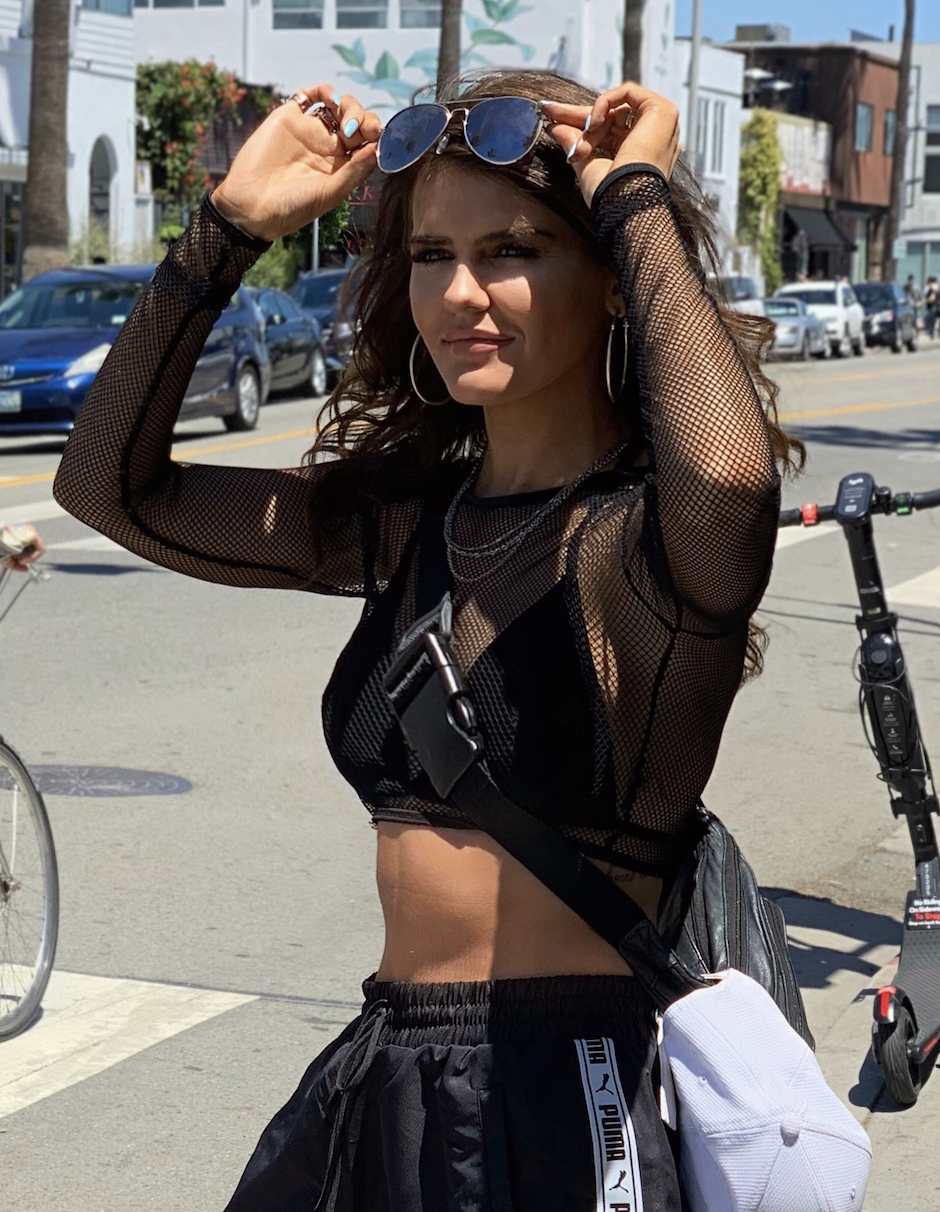
- Morgan in Los Angeles, 2019

Background information
- Born: 4 January 1992 (age 34); Fazakerley, Liverpool, England
- Origin: Walthamstow, London, England
- Genres: Pop
- Occupations: Singer, songwriter
- Years active: 2008—present
- Label: Warner/679 Artists (2010–2012) Concord/Karma Artists (2016-2022)

Tye Morgan (born 4 January 1992) is an English singer and songwriter.

== Life and career ==
At the age of 16, Morgan signed to Simon Fuller's management company 19 Entertainment (XIX) and signed a record deal with Warner Music Group/679 Recordings at 18 after touring with Marina & The Diamonds on The Family Jewels Tour. She then went on to support Pete Wentz/Black Cards and Janelle Monáe on their UK tours.

In 2017 Morgan signed a deal with Concord Music Group/Karma Artists and later in 2018 co-wrote the Spanish hit "Lo malo" which topped the Spanish singles chart and received 5 x platinum certification, as well as reaching gold status in the United States. The song has over 300,000,000 streams to date.

In 2019 Morgan co-wrote the official song for the Cricket World Cup, 'Stand By' with Rudimental and Loryn. She also co-wrote and provided vocals for the lead single from Cashmere Cat's album Princess Catgirl, entitled 'For Your Eyes Only' with Cashmere Cat, Benny Blanco and Francis and The Lights as well as Toby Scott and Paul Harris, which hit number 12 on the Billboard Dance/Electronic charts. Shortly after, Four of Diamonds released the single 'Eating Me Up' which Morgan also co-wrote with Freedo and Tia Rice.

In April 2020, Morgan co-wrote the Michael Calfan and Martin Solveig single 'No Lie' with Toby Scott, Paul Harris and Iman Conta Hultén.

In March 2021, Morgan co-wrote with Jack Morgan and Grades the song 'Mystery' on Super Junior's 'The Renaissance' album, which reached number 1 in 12 countries.

In February 2022, Morgan co-wrote the lead single 'INVU' on Taeyeon's album of the same name. 'INVU' debuted at number one on South Korea's Gaon Digital Chart in the chart issue dated 13–19 February 2022; on its component charts, the song debuted at number one on the Gaon Download Chart, number two on the Gaon Streaming Chart, and number eight on the Gaon BGM Chart. It ascended to number one on the Gaon Streaming Chart in the following week. On the Billboard K-pop Hot 100, the song debuted at number 15 in the chart issue dated 26 February 2022, ascending to number one in the following week.

In May 2022, Morgan featured on 'Gang Gang' alongside DJ Katch. The song was written by Morgan and Freedo and was the first song Morgan sang on as a featured vocalist. Following this, in June 2022, Morgan featured on 'Slide' with Michael Calfan. The song was written by Morgan, Jack Morgan and Freedo.

In June 2022, Morgan launched her own home fragrance company ‘sense of ldn’ which was featured in British Vogue and Country Living in November of the same year.

In 2023, Morgan continued working as a songwriter and featured vocalist. Her releases during this period included “Look for You” with Asle, “Not Ready to Let Go” by Jethro Heston, and “Me & U” with Lazar.

In August 2024, Morgan released the EP Bittersweet, which she wrote, produced, and performed. The EP featured the tracks “Bittersweet,” “Small Wins,” “Stay the Same,” “Cinnamon,” and “If You Could Love Me.” Alongside her own releases, she continued writing for other artists, including “Everything at Once” by Sonia Stein.

In 2025, Morgan continued her songwriting work across pop and R&B releases, including “Anomaly” by Sonia Stein and “Be Your Friend” by Cheat Codes, Edward Maya, and Enisa.

Later in 2025, Morgan co-wrote “Bad Gyal Energy,” a single recorded by the artist Morgan and released on Red Bull Records. The track was used as the opening song at the Red Bull Dance Your Style World Final in Los Angeles.

== Education ==
Morgan completed a Bachelor of Laws (LLB) degree at the University of Greenwich in 2023. She later completed a Master’s degree in Entertainment Law at the University of Westminster in 2025, focusing on legal frameworks governing the music and entertainment industries.

== Discography ==
Song	Year	Artist	Album	Role
Revolving	2011	The Streets Remix	Non-album single	Co-writer, artist
The Vaccine	2011	Fanfair	Non-album single	Co-writer
Try	2013	Alexandra Burke	NewRulesEP	Writer
Hum	2016	Sweet California	3	Co-writer
Crush	2017	Ben Adams	Crush	Co-writer
Lo Malo	2018	Aitana, Ana Guerra	Sus Canciones (Operación Triunfo 2017)	Co-writer
Lo Malo Remix	2018	Aitana, Ana Guerra, Greeicy, TINI	Lo Malo (Remix)	Co-writer
Stand By	2019	Rudimental, Loryn	Non-album single	Co-writer
Eating Me Up	2019	Four of Diamonds	Non-album single	Co-writer
For Your Eyes Only	2019	Cashmere Cat	Princess Catgirl	Co-writer, vocals
I Need You Tonight	2019	Delena	Non-album single	Co-writer
No Lie	2020	Michael Calfan, Martin Solveig	Non-album single	Co-writer
Your Problem	2020	Four of Diamonds	Non-album single	Co-writer
SOS	2020	Delena	Non-album single	Co-writer
Mystery	2021	Super Junior	The Renaissance	Co-writer
Don't Hold Your Breath	2021	Delena	Non-album single	Co-writer
INVU	2022	Taeyeon	INVU	Co-writer
Gang Gang	2022	DJ Katch x Tye Morgan	Non-album single	Co-writer, featured vocalist
Slide	2022	Michael Calfan ft. Tye Morgan	Non-album single	Co-writer, featured vocalist
Look For You	2023	Asle ft. Tye Morgan	Non-album single	Co-writer, featured vocalist
Not Ready To Let Go	2023	Jethro Heston	Non-album single	Co-writer, vocals
Me & U	2023	Lazar x Tye Morgan	Non-album single	Vocals
Everything At Once	2024	Sonia Stein	Blooming Season	Co-writer
Bittersweet	2024	Tye Morgan	Bittersweet EP	Writer, producer, vocals
Small Wins	2024	Tye Morgan	Bittersweet EP	Writer, producer, vocals
Stay The Same	2024	Tye Morgan	Bittersweet EP	Writer, producer, vocals
Cinnamon	2024	Tye Morgan	Bittersweet EP	Writer, producer, vocals
If You Could Love Me	2024	Tye Morgan	Bittersweet EP	Writer, producer, vocals
Anomoly	2025	Sonia Stein	Blooming Season	Co-writer
Be Your Friend	2025	Cheat Codes, Edward Maya, Enisa	Future Renaissance	Co-writer
Bag Gyal Energy	2025	Morgan	Non-album single	Co-writer

== Tours ==
Supporting

- The Family Jewels Tour (2010)
- Black Cards UK Tour (2010)
- Songs from the Tainted Cherry Tree Tour (2010)
- The ArchAndroid Tour (2010)
