= S.O.A.P. (duo) =

Danish pop duo

- Origin: Næstved, Denmark
- Genres: Pop, dance
- Years active: 1997–2002
- Past members: Heidi "Suriya" Sørensen; Saseline "Line" Sørensen

S.O.A.P. were a Danish pop music duo made up of the two sisters Heidi "Suriya" Sørensen (born 18 October 1979) and Saseline "Line" Sørensen (born 26 July 1982). Their music was primarily written by Remee and produced by Holger Lagerfeldt for Sony Music Entertainment Denmark. They released two albums before they disbanded in 2002. They are best known for their single "This Is How We Party", and sold almost 2 million albums worldwide.

Their first album Not Like Other Girls won best pop album at the 1999 Danish Music Awards. Remee and Holger Lagerfeldt were also nominated for producer of the year for the album, and "Stand by You" was nominated for best radio hit. In 2017, BuzzFeed listed the song "This Is How We Party" at No. 100 on their list of "The 101 Greatest Dance Songs of the '90s".

S.O.A.P. were described in Billboard as "looking to be the biggest thing out of Denmark since Aqua."

== History ==
Heidi and Saseline were born in the state of Perak in Malaysia though were raised in Næstved, along with their younger brother Daniel. Their father is Danish and their mother is Malaysian. Heidi met Remee when she interviewed him for the youth magazine she worked for. Her father, who had accompanied her to the interview, mentioned to Remee that Heidi was a singer. Remee asked Heidi to sing on a solo album with him, however, she stated that she would not do anything without her sister. Remee subsequently withdrew his offer, though approached the girls a year later stating he wanted to produce an album with both of them. The sisters chose the name S.O.A.P. because they thought it was fun, although it did not stand for anything. Heidi and Saseline once held a competition for their fans to come up with a backronym. "Sisters Organising a Party" was one of their favourite choices, though they were unimpressed by the "countless unsavoury submissions".

Their first album, Not Like Other Girls, was released on 18 March 1998 in Denmark for Sony Music Entertainment. It was released in the US on 5 May, as a self-titled album on Crave Records, with a European release under Sony held around the same time. Remee wrote the lyrics for the album, which was produced by Holger Lagerfeldt. The album was certified gold in Finland and Denmark, and had sold over 15,000 copies in the US by July 1998. By August 2000, it had sold 1.5 million copies worldwide. It featured the successful debut single, "This Is How We Party", which spent ten weeks in the top five in Denmark, reached No. 1 in Sweden where it achieved gold status, and was also certified platinum in Australia, where it reached No. 7. The song found significant radio coverage in the US, and S.O.A.P. were described in Billboard as "looking to be the biggest thing out of Denmark since Aqua." The second single from the album, "Ladidi Ladida", was certified gold in Australia, where it reached No. 15. In the US, "Stand by You" was chosen as the second single from the album and was released in late June. S.O.A.P. won two of their four nominations at the 1999 Danish Music Awards: best new act and best pop album for Not Like Other Girls. Their fourth and final single from their debut album was the eponymous track "Not Like Other Girls", which was featured as a bonus track on the soundtrack for Songs from Dawson's Creek.

S.O.A.P. opened for the Backstreet Boys on their Backstreet's Back Tour in 1998 at 25 venues in the US between 8 July and 14 August.

In 1999, they recorded the Christmas song "Let Love Be Love" alongside Juice and Christina featuring Remee. The song remains popular at Christmas time in Denmark, where it charted in 2007 and again in 2011 at No. 20 and No. 34 respectively. The song was certified gold by the International Federation of the Phonographic Industry in December 2013. They were also selected by Australian duo Savage Garden to be the opening act on their 2000 European tour. In 2000, they released their second and final album, Miracle. The album was less successful than their debut, with its lead single, "S.O.A.P. Is in the Air" only charting in Denmark and Sweden, where it reached No. 3 and No. 25 respectively. S.O.A.P. sold nearly two million albums worldwide.

== Disbandment and later work ==
In 2002, S.O.A.P. disbanded. From 2002 till 2003, Saseline was a TV presenter, hosting the Danish music program Boogie. In 2005, she featured on the charity single "Hvor små vi er" and was also a contestant on the show Expedition Robinson 2005 (VIP), the Danish version of Survivor. She had a son with tennis player Frederik Fetterlein in 2008, though the couple separated during her pregnancy. In 2010, she released a solo album, Restart. In 2012, she was a contestant on Vild med dans, the Danish version of Dancing with the Stars. In 2014, she had another son with her boyfriend Michael Dreyer. In 2016, Saseline Sørensen changed her name to Saszeline Emanuelle Dreyer after visiting a numerologist. During the COVID-19 pandemic, Saszeline drew controversy for spreading misinformation regarding COVID-19 and its vaccines, leading to her being banned from Instagram.

Heidi took a break from the music industry after S.O.A.P. disbanded, and trained to become a tattoo artist while learning to write her own music. She later recorded as a solo artist under the name Suriya, releasing her first single "My Desire" in 2008 and second single "Louis Bag" in 2011. Her song "Forever I B Young" was chosen as a wildcard entry for the Dansk Melodi Grand Prix 2012, the Danish national selection for the Eurovision Song Contest.

== Legacy, sampling and covers ==
In 2017, BuzzFeed listed "This Is How We Party" at No. 100 on their list of "The 101 Greatest Dance Songs of the '90s". In 2002, the song was sampled in BoA's song "Tragic", and in 2019 it was sampled in a song also titled "This Is How We Party" by R3hab and Icona Pop.

"Stand by You" was covered by S Club 7 on their 2000 album 7, while that same year "Ladidi Ladida" was covered by i5.

== Discography ==
=== Albums ===
Year	Album	Peak chart positions					Certifications
Year	Album	DEN	AUS	FIN	NZ	SWE	Certifications
1998	Not Like Other Girls	3	61	2	32	40	IFPI DEN: Platinum; IFPI FIN: Gold
2000	Miracle	20	—	—	—	—	
"—" denotes the album did not chart or was not released in that territory

=== Singles ===
Year	Title	Peak Chart positions										Certifications	Album
Year	Title	AUS	FIN	FRA	NL	NZ	NOR	UK	US Hot 100	US Top 40	SWE	Certifications	Album
1998	"This Is How We Party"	7	5	4	17	5	8	36	51	21	1	ARIA: Platinum; GLF: Gold	Not Like Other Girls
1998	"Ladidi Ladida"	15	—	28	—	8	—	—	—	—	58	ARIA: Gold	Not Like Other Girls
1998	"Stand by You"	82	—	—	—	—	—	—	—	—	—		Not Like Other Girls
1999	"Not Like Other Girls"	—	—	—	—	—	—	—	—	—	—		Not Like Other Girls
1999	"Let Love Be Love" (Juice, S.O.A.P., Christina featuring Remee)	—	—	—	—	—	—	—	—	—	—	IFPI: Gold	Non-album single
2000	"S.O.A.P. Is in the Air"	—	—	—	—	—	—	—	—	—	25		Miracle
2000	"Mr. DJ"	—	—	—	—	—	—	—	—	—	—		Miracle
2000	"Like a Stone (In the Water)"	—	—	—	—	—	—	—	—	—	—		Miracle
2001	"Holiday"	—	—	—	—	—	—	—	—	—	—		Non-album single
"—" denotes a title that did not chart, or was not released in that territory.
