= Soulshock & Cutfather =

- Origin: Denmark
- Genres: Jazz, pop, R&B
- Years active: Late 1980s–early 1990s
- Members: Carsten Schack; Mich Hedin Hansen
- Website: www.soulpower.net

Soulshock & Cutfather was a Danish production duo active in the late 1980s and early 1990s, made up of Carsten Schack, better known as Soulshock, and Mich Hedin Hansen, better known as Cutfather.

As a production and DJ duo, they remixed songs by Danish artists such as Lis Sørensen ("Mine øjne de skal se"), Cut 'N' Move ("Get Serious" and "Spread Love"), Laid Back ("Bakerman") and Back to Back ("Jonathan"). In 1990, they started a record label together, Soulpower Productions, as part of Medley Records, where they particularly produced for Yasmin and Cut 'N' Move. Several times they won mixing championships and produced for Queen Latifah and Ultra Naté.

The duo collaboration ended with Carsten Schack immigrating to the United States and soon after forming the duo Soulshock & Karlin with Kenneth Karlin.

Carsten Schack and Mich Hansen have both been judges on the Danish X Factor, Carsten "Soulshock" Schack in season 3 (2010) and Mich "Cutfather" Hansen in season 4 (2011) and season 5 (2012).

== See also ==
- Soulshock
- Soulshock & Karlin
- Cutfather & Joe
