= No More (A1 song) =

2001 single by A1

Single by A1

from the album The A List
- B-side: "Three Times a Lady"; "I'll Take the Tears" (live); "Livin' la Vida Loca" (live)
- Released: 19 February 2001
- Length: 3:43
- Label: Columbia
- Songwriters: Stevie Bensusen; Claudio Cueni; Lindy Robbins; Damon Sharpe
- Producers: Stevie Bensusen; Claudio Cueni; Cutfather & Joe

A1 singles chronology
"Same Old Brand New You" (2000)	"No More" (2001)	"Caught in the Middle" (2002)

Music video
- "No More" on YouTube

"No More" is a song by British-Norwegian boy band A1. It was released on 19 February 2001 as the third single from their second studio album, The A List (2000). The song was written by Stevie Bensusen, Claudio Cueni, Lindy Robbins, and Damon Sharpe, and produced by the former two. The song was re-produced and remixed by Danish production duo Cutfather & Joe for the song's single release. The song peaked at number six on the UK Singles Chart, becoming the band's seventh consecutive top-10 single.

== Music video ==
The video for "No More" was filmed in Singapore, as the Asian Pacific region was at the time a major market for the boy band sound.

== Track listings ==
- UK CD1
1. "No More" (Cutfather & Joe mix) – 3:43
2. "Three Times a Lady" – 3:37
3. "I'll Take the Tears" (live on the UK2K Tour) – 4:38
- UK CD2
1. "No More" (Riprock 'n' Alex G mix) – 3:28
2. "No More" (E-Smoove club mix) – 9:00
3. "Livin' la Vida Loca" (live on the UK2K Tour) – 3:45
- UK cassette single
1. "No More" (Cutfather & Joe mix) – 3:43
2. "Three Times a Lady" – 3:37

== Charts ==
=== Weekly charts ===
Chart (2001)	Peak position
Europe (Eurochart Hot 100)	29
Ireland (IRMA)	35
Scottish Singles Sales (Official Charts)	5
Sweden (Sverigetopplistan)	56
UK Singles (Official Charts)	6

=== Year-end charts ===
Chart (2001)	Position
UK Singles (OCC)	126
