= INVU (song) =

- iScreaM remixes cover

Single by Taeyeon

from the album INVU
- Language: Korean
- Released: February 14, 2022
- Studio: SM Big Shot (Seoul); SM Starlight (Seoul); SM Blue Cup (Seoul)
- Genre: House; dance-pop; synth-pop
- Length: 3:24
- Label: SM; Dreamus
- Composers: Peter Wallevik; Daniel Davidsen; Rachel Furner; Jess Morgan
- Lyricist: Jinli (Full8loom)

Taeyeon singles chronology
"Can't Control Myself" (2022)	"INVU" (2022)	"Night Into Days" (2023)

Music video
- "INVU" on YouTube

"INVU" (/aɪ ɛn viː juː/) is a song recorded by South Korean singer Taeyeon for her third studio album of the same name. It was released as the lead single by SM Entertainment on February 14, 2022. "INVU" was written by Jinli (Full8loom), composed by Peter Wallevik, Daniel Davidsen, Rachel Furner, and Jess Morgan, and arranged by PhD.

== Background and release ==
On January 11, 2022, SM Entertainment announced that Taeyeon would release a digital single titled "Can't Control Myself" on January 17 prior to the release of her third studio album in February 2022. On January 26, the name of the third studio album was announced as INVU, for release on February 14 and consisting of thirteen tracks, with pre-orders starting on the same day. On February 3, the mood sampler video was released with "INVU" announced as the lead single. On February 12, the music video teaser was released. On February 14, the song was released as the lead single of INVU, alongside the music video.

During the press conference for INVU held on February 14, the singer stated that there was "pushback" against choosing the song as the lead single, as her team "was saying 'No' and [she] was the only one who was saying 'Yes!'". She called it "a bold decision, but [she] had confidence" that it was the best choice. On February 15, in an interview with Nylon via email, Taeyeon said that she was "immediately drawn to this type of genre" upon hearing the song. The singer also revealed "INVU" as her favorite song off the album and added that "The way I approach love is similar to how ["INVU"] describes it, so I feel a little more attached to it".

On April 28, the three remixes of "INVU" by Zhu, Moon Kyoo, and Ginjo, titled iScreaM Vol.15: INVU Remixes, was released.

== Composition ==
"INVU"
"INVU" was described as a house, dance-pop, and synth-pop song that features "melancholy lyrics by saving 'I envy you' towards a partner who does not take love seriously".

"INVU" was written by Jinli (Full8loom), composed by Peter Wallevik, Daniel Davidsen, Rachel Furner, and Jess Morgan, and arranged by PhD. Musically, the song was described as a house, dance-pop, and synth-pop song with a "funky beat", "soft and dreamy synth sound", "impressive flute melody in the chorus", "vocals that deeply express the various emotions contained in the song", and "splendid high notes [that] emphasize the lyrics". The song features "melancholy lyrics by saying 'I envy you' towards a partner who does not take love seriously". "INVU" was composed in the key of B minor, with a tempo of 107 beats per minute.

== Music video ==
A scene in the music video, which shows Taeyeon as an archer, standing in a marble-carved ancient Roman-inspired temple.

The music video directed by Samson of High Quality Fish was released alongside the song by SM Entertainment on February 14. The "celestial"-themed music video portrays Taeyeon "as an enchanting warrior on a quest to annihilate the love that destroyed her" with scenes switching between "a marble-carved ancient Roman-inspired temple to a vast desert wasteland". She described the music video as "a new kind of image and visual that [she] hasn't tried before", stating that the song's concept "is about a main character who is hurt by love but nonetheless gives it all when it comes to love, and [she] wanted to express this through strong, warlike visuals in the music video", including various sets that "remind the viewers of Greek mythology".

The music video was chosen as one of the best K-pop videos of the year by Teen Vogue and Rolling Stone India.

== Commercial performance ==
Professional ratings
Review scores
Source	Rating
Music Y	3.5/5 stars

In addition to achieving a perfect all-kill on the South Korean charts, "INVU" debuted at number one on South Korea's Gaon Digital Chart in the chart issue dated February 13–19, 2022; on its component charts, the song debuted at number one on the Gaon Download Chart, number two on the Gaon Streaming Chart, and number eight on the Gaon BGM Chart. It ascended to number one on the Gaon Streaming Chart in the following week. On the Billboard K-pop Hot 100, the song debuted at number 15 in the chart issue dated February 26, 2022, ascending to number one in the following week. The song debuted at number seven on the Billboard South Korea Songs in the chart issue dated May 7, 2022.

In Singapore, the song debuted at number 29 on the RIAS Top Streaming Chart and number eight on the Top Regional Chart in the chart issue dated February 11–17, 2022, ascending to number 11 on the Top Streaming Chart and number four on the Top Regional Chart in the following week. The song also debuted at number 11 on the Billboard Singapore Songs in the chart issue dated March 5, 2022. On the Billboard Vietnam Hot 100, the song debuted at number 26 in the chart issue dated February 24, 2022, ascending to number 12 in the following week. In Taiwan, the song debuted at number 15 on the Taiwan Songs in the chart issue dated February 26, 2022, ascending to number eight in the following week. In Hong Kong, the song debuted at number 13 on the Billboard Hong Kong Songs in the chart issue dated March 5, 2022. In Malaysia, the song debuted at number 15 on the Billboard Malaysia Songs in the chart issue dated March 5, 2022.

In United States, the song debuted at number eight on the Billboard World Digital Song Sales in the chart issue dated February 26, 2022. Globally, the song debuted at number 138 on the Billboard Global Excl. U.S. in the chart issue dated March 5, 2022.

== Promotion ==
Prior to the album's release, on February 14, 2022, Taeyeon held a live event called "Taeyeon INVU Countdown Live" on YouTube to introduce the album and communicate with her fans. Following the album release, she performed "INVU" on two music programs: Mnet's M Countdown on February 17, and SBS's Inkigayo on February 20.

== Accolades ==
Awards and nominations
Award ceremony	Year	Category	Result	Ref.
Asian Pop Music Awards	2022	Best Music Video (Overseas)	Nominated	
Circle Chart Music Awards	2023	Artist of the Year – Global Digital Music (February)	Won	
Golden Disc Awards	2023	Digital Bonsang	Nominated	
Korean Music Awards	2023	Best Electronic Song (Note: Credit for "INVU (Moon Kyoo Remix)" version)	Nominated	
MAMA Awards	2022	Best Vocal Performance — Solo	Won	
MAMA Awards	2022	Song of the Year	Nominated	
Melon Music Awards	2022	Song of the Year	Nominated	

Listicles
Publisher	Listicle	Placement	Ref.
Billboard	The 25 Best K-Pop Songs of 2022: Staff Picks	8th	
CNN Philippines	CNN Philippines' 25 Favorite K-pop Songs of 2022	Placed	
Idology	Closing 2022: The 20 Songs of the Year	Placed	
NME	The 25 Best K-Pop Songs of 2022	3rd	
Rolling Stone India	The 10 Best Korean Music Videos of 2022	5th	
Teen Vogue	The 21 Best K-Pop Music Videos of 2022	Placed	
Teen Vogue	The 79 Best K-Pop Songs of 2022	Placed	
The Korea Herald	2022 Highlights of K-Pop	6th	
The Telegraph	Top 20 K-Pop Hits of the Year	12th	

Music program awards
Title	Date	Ref.
Inkigayo	February 27, 2022	
Inkigayo	March 6, 2022	
Inkigayo	March 13, 2022	
M Countdown	February 24, 2022	
Show! Music Core	February 26, 2022	
Show! Music Core	March 5, 2022	
Show! Music Core	March 12, 2022	
Show! Music Core	March 19, 2022	

Melon weekly popularity award
Award	Date	Ref.
Weekly Popularity Award	February 28, 2022	
Weekly Popularity Award	March 7, 2022	
Weekly Popularity Award	March 14, 2022	
Weekly Popularity Award	March 21, 2022	

== Track listing ==
- Digital download / streaming – Original
1. "INVU" – 3:24
- Digital download / streaming – Remixes
1. "INVU" (Zhu remix) – 3:39
2. "INVU" (Moon Kyoo remix) – 4:11
3. "INVU" (Ginjo remix) – 3:40

== Credits and personnel ==
Credits adapted from liner notes of INVU.

Studio

- SM Big Shot Studio – recording
- SM Starlight Studio – digital editing, engineered for mix
- SM Blue Cup Studio – mixing
- 821 Sound – mastering

Personnel

- SM Entertainment – executive producer
- Lee Soo-man – producer
- Yoo Young-jin – music and sound supervisor
- Taeyeon – vocals, background vocals
- Rachel Furner – background vocals, composition
- Jinli (Full8loom) – lyrics
- Peter Wallevik (PhD) – composition, arrangement
- Daniel Davidsen (PhD) – composition, arrangement
- Jess Morgan – composition
- Lee Min-kyu – recording
- Jeong Yoo-ra – digital editing, engineered for mix
- Lee Joo-hyung – vocal directing, Pro Tools operating
- Jung Eui-seok – mixing
- Kwon Nam-woo – mastering

== Charts ==
=== Weekly charts ===
Weekly chart performance
Chart (2022)	Peak position
Global Excl. U.S. (Billboard)	138
Hong Kong (Billboard)	13
Malaysia (Billboard)	15
Malaysia (RIM)	14
Singapore (Billboard)	11
Singapore (RIAS)	11
South Korea (Gaon)	1
South Korea (K-pop Hot 100)	1
Taiwan (Billboard)	8
US World Digital Song Sales (Billboard)	8
Vietnam (Vietnam Hot 100)	12

=== Monthly charts ===
Monthly chart performance
Chart (2022)	Peak position
South Korea (Gaon)	1

=== Year-end charts ===
2022 year-end chart performance for "INVU"
Chart (2022)	Peak position
South Korea (Circle)	12

2023 year-end chart performance for "INVU"
Chart (2023)	Position
South Korea (Circle)	149

== Certifications ==
Region	Certification	Certified units/sales
Streaming
South Korea (KMCA)	Platinum	100,000,000^{†}
^{†} Streaming-only figures based on certification alone.

== Release history ==
Release history
Region	Date	Format	Label
Various	February 14, 2022	Digital download; streaming	SM; Dreamus
Various	April 28, 2022	Digital download; streaming	SM; ScreaM; Dreamus

== See also ==
- List of Inkigayo Chart winners (2022)
- List of M Countdown Chart winners (2022)
- List of Show! Music Core Chart winners (2022)
- List of Gaon Digital Chart number ones of 2022
- List of K-pop Hot 100 number ones of 2022
