= Page Four =

Danish boy band

- Origin: Denmark
- Genres: Pop
- Years active: 2014–2018,2023—
- Labels: Sony Music Entertainment
- Members: Lauritz Emll Christiansen; Jonas Eilskov; Stefan Hjort; Pelle Højer
- Website: http://www.pagefour.dk/

Page Four is a Danish boy band established in Copenhagen in November 2014 by the four members: Lauritz Emil Christiansen, Jonas Eilskov, Stefan Hjort and Pelle Højer. The band was discovered by uploading cover versions online and were eventually signed to Sony Music Entertainment Denmark.

The group sang in Danish and their debut single "Sommer" was co-written by Tim McEwan, Theis Andersen and Søren Ohrt Nissen. The single, as well as the following three singles "Fucking smuk" "Du og jeg - Magi i luften", and "Vinder" all entered the top 15 in the Danish single chart Tracklisten. "Sommer" also entered the Europe Official Top 100.

== Discography ==
=== Albums ===
Year	Album	Peak positions
Year	Album	DEN
2016	Page Four	7

=== EPs ===
Year	Album	Peak positions
Year	Album	DEN
2025	Indeni	

=== Singles ===
Year	Single	Peak positions	
Year	Single	DEN	Europe
2015	"Sommer"	14	_
2015	"Fucking Smuk"	14	99
2016	"Du og jeg - Magi i luften"	10	_
2017	"Bedre end din eks"	16	_
2017	"Koldt udenfor"	_	_
2023	"Du hader mig"	15	_
2024	"Altid dig"	_	_
2025	"Sommerfugle"	_	_
2025	"Mere Tilbage"	_	_

== Videography ==
- 2015: "Sommer"
- 2016: "Vinder"
- 2016: "17 år"
