= Europop =

European pop music genre

- Stylistic origins: Pop; disco (1970s)
- Cultural origins: 1960s, Europe
- Derivative forms: K-pop

Other topics
- List of artists

Europop (also spelled Euro pop) is a style of pop music characterized by polished production, simple and highly catchy melodies, repetitive choruses, and light lyrical themes. The style consolidated itself mainly in continental Europe from the mid to late 1960s, although it exerted significant influence on British and American artists, and topped the charts throughout the 1980s and 1990s, with revivals and moderate degrees of appreciation in the 2000s. The Swedish group ABBA is widely considered the leading representative of classic Europop.

== History ==
During the 1970s and early 1980s, such groups were primarily popular in continental countries, with the exception of ABBA (1972–1983). The Swedish four-person band achieved great success in the UK, where they scored twenty top 10 singles and nine chart-topping albums, and in North America and Australia.

In the late 1980s and early 1990s, Europop became very popular. Roxette and Ace of Base led Europop in American mainstream audiences. In the 1990s, pop groups like the Spice Girls, Aqua, Steps, Right Said Fred, Backstreet Boys and singer DJ BoBo were strongly influenced by Europop. Throughout the late 1990s and early 2000s, the Italian dance group Eiffel 65 were highly active in this genre. In the 2000s, one of the most popular representatives of Europop music was Swedish pop group Alcazar and German pop group Cascada.

== See also ==
- List of Europop artists
- Eurodance
- Eurovision Song Contest
