= Songs from Dawson's Creek =

1999 soundtrack album by various artists

Soundtrack album by Various artists
- Released: April 27, 1999
- Genres: Pop; pop rock; folk
- Length: 60:21
- Labels: Columbia; Sony Music

Songs from Dawson's Creek is the first soundtrack album for the teen drama television series Dawson's Creek. Released by Columbia Records and Sony Music after the broadcasting of the series' first season on The WB network, it features a set of pop rock and folk pop songs by artists such as Sophie B. Hawkins, Jessica Simpson, Shooter, Heather Nova, Adam Cohen, Sixpence None the Richer, and Paula Cole, most of which appeared during the series' second season.

A commercial success, it scattered two US charts hit singles, including Sixpence None the Richer's "Kiss Me" and Dawson's Creek's theme song "I Don't Want to Wait", and reached the top of the Australian Albums Chart. The album also peaked within the top in Austria, Norway, Sweden, and the United States. During it first sixth months of release, Songs from Dawson's Creek sold more than 1.5 million copies worldwide and was certified triple platinum by the Australian Recording Industry Association (ARIA) and gold by the Recording Industry Association of America (RIAA). In Australia, it became the fifth highest selling album of 1999.

== Track listing ==
Songs from Dawson's Creek track listing
No.	Title	Performer(s)	Length
1.	"Kiss Me"	Sixpence None the Richer	3:18
2.	"Lose Your Way"	Sophie B. Hawkins	4:03
3.	"Feels Like Home"	Chantal Kreviazuk	4:40
4.	"Life's a Bitch"	Shooter	3:09
5.	"Ready for a Fall"	P.J. Olsson	4:29
6.	"Stay You"	Wood	3:48
7.	"Any Lucky Penny"	Nikki Hassman	4:36
8.	"Shimmer"	Shawn Mullins	4:07
9.	"London Rain (Nothing Heals Me Like You Do)"	Heather Nova	3:49
10.	"To Be Loved"	Curtis Stigers	3:54
11.	"Letting Go"	Sozzi	4:39
12.	"Cry Ophelia"	Adam Cohen	3:48
13.	"Did You Ever Love Somebody"	Jessica Simpson	3:48
14.	"Blame It on the Weatherman" (bonus track)	B*Witched	3:35
15.	"Not Like Other Girls" (bonus track)	S.O.A.P.	4:25
16.	"I Don't Want to Wait" (theme song)	Paula Cole	5:19

== Charts ==
=== Weekly charts ===
Chart (1999-2000)	Peak position
Australian Albums (ARIA)	1
Austrian Albums (Ö3 Austria)	2
Belgian Albums (Ultratop Flanders)	32
Belgian Albums (Ultratop Wallonia)	13
Finnish Albums (Suomen virallinen lista)	40
French Albums (SNEP)	13
Hungarian Albums (MAHASZ)	39
New Zealand Albums (RMNZ)	18
Norwegian Albums (VG-lista)	10
Swedish Albums (Sverigetopplistan)	4
Swiss Albums (Schweizer Hitparade)	14
US Billboard 200	7
US Top Internet Albums (Billboard)	9

=== Year-end charts ===
Chart (1999)	Position
Australian Albums (ARIA)	5
Austrian Albums (Ö3 Austria)	18
Belgian Albums (Ultratop Wallonia)	74
New Zealand Albums (RMNZ)	50
US Billboard 200	159

== Certifications ==
Region	Certification	Certified units/sales
Australia (ARIA)	3× Platinum	210,000^{^}
United States (RIAA)	Gold	500,000^{^}
^{^} Shipments figures based on certification alone.

== Australian version ==
The Australian version featured the song Photograph by Australian band Something For Kate, instead of the U.S. bonus tracks. As a result, this version contained only fifteen tracks.
