= Christine Milton =

Danish singer, songwriter and dancer

- Born: 18 July 1985 (age 41); Amager, Denmark
- Genres: R&B
- Occupations: Singer, songwriter, dancer, actress
- Years active: 2002–present
- Labels: RCA/BMG (2002-2004); Sony BMG (2007); Smokenhagen Records (2008); Nightology Records (2010)
- Website: www.christinemilton.dk

Christine Milton (born 18 July 1985) is a Danish singer, songwriter, dancer and actress. She was one of the participants in Denmark's version of the Popstars franchise, having competed in season 2. Despite not winning, she was signed to record label BMG.

== Career ==
She is the original singer behind Jamelia's international hit single "Superstar", which was written and produced by Danish producers Cutfather & Joe and Remee in 2002, and released in January 2003. It spent seven weeks at number one on the official Danish singles chart, sold over 12,000 copies, and gave Milton her first gold and platinum record.

In 2004 she co-hosted the annual Danish MGP, a song contest for kids aged 8 to 15, on DR1.

On 8 April 2004, Milton released her debut album Friday. Written and produced by the Swedish producers Ghost (Ulf Lindström & Johan Ekhé) and Danish producers Cutfather & Joe and Remee, the album was a number 1 success in Denmark. It also spawned three further singles, "Whicketywhack (I Ain't Coming Back)", "Shine On" and "So Addictive".

In 2005 she provided the voice dubbing for one of the characters in the Danish release of the adventure/comedy film Racing Stripes.

In November 2006, "Superstar" appeared on the debut album of American singer Bianca Ryan, the first winner of the reality talent show America's Got Talent.

Milton released her first Danish single, "Det' forbi" ("It's Over") in 2007. A year later, she released the single "Tilbage" on Smokenhagen Records, a label owned by the hip-hop production team Madness 4 Real.

On 12 April 2010, Milton returned with the come-back single "Leave You Now", released on Danish house producer Rune RK's Nightology Records.

== Personal life ==
Milton was born on 18 July 1985 in Amager, Denmark and was raised in Gilleleje, as one of four siblings.

== Discography ==
=== Albums ===
- Friday (2004)

=== Singles ===
Year	Title	Peak chart positions		Certifications	Album
Year	Title	DEN	NOR	Certifications	Album
2003	"Superstar"	1	15	IFPI: Platinum	Friday
2003	"Whiketywhack (I Ain't Coming Back)"	4	—		Friday
2004	"Shine On"	8	—		Friday
2004	"So Addictive"	—	—		Friday
2007	"Det' forbi"	—	—		—N/a
2008	"Tilbage"	—	—		—N/a
2010	"Leave You Now"	—	—		—N/a

== Awards ==
- FHM Denmark: "World's 100 Sexiest Women" (2004): ranked #41
- FHM Denmark: "World's 100 Sexiest Women" (2005): ranked #29
