= I5 (girl group) =

America-based girl group

i5
- Origin: United States
- Genres: Pop; teen pop; dance-pop
- Years active: 1999–2001
- Label: Giant Records
- Past members: Kate Macalino; Tal B. Hajek; Christina Rumbley; Andi McCormack; Gaby Equiz

i5 was an American-based girl group whose name stood for "International Five". The group formed in 1999 and disbanded in 2001.

== History ==
=== 1999-2001: Formation, debut album, rising fame and breakup ===
In 1999, Giant Records, mainly a dance music label, sought to create a girl group. The label's hook for this new group would be that its members were international, to appeal to a larger fan base. Auditions were held, and the five members selected represented five distinct nationalities. Kate Macalino, from the Philippines, had worked as a model in her home country. Tal B. Hajek, from Israel, was a devout Jew who had moved to the US in 1997 and admired rock singers. Christina Rumbley, from the United States, had moved from Florida to Los Angeles to pursue a music career. Andi Murphy-McCormack was from the UK and had a passion for dancing. Gaby Equiz, from Mexico, a Latina who dreamed of fame. Together, all girls became "International Five", more commonly referred to as i5.

In Spring 2000, i5 was featured on the soundtrack to the dance film Center Stage with their song "First Kiss." By the summer of 2000, the quintet had almost finished their debut album and began touring with Nickelodeon's All That Music and More tour. On this tour, i5 promoted its single "Distracted," which was written by Steve Kipner, who had previously written hits for Christina Aguilera, Brandy Norwood, and Dream.

On September 12, 2000, Giant Records released i5's self-titled debut album. The album failed to chart and was a mass-market failure due to their label being unable to release any more singles or significantly promote the album due to its imminent folding. Once Giant Records folded, Warner Bros. Records, its parent, absorbed it, and i5 did not have a label again. Though the members of i5 initially sought a new record label, they failed to find one, and parted ways in late 2001.

== Discography ==
=== Studio albums ===
- i5 (2000)

=== Singles ===
- "Distracted" (2000)
