= Remee =

Danish rapper, songwriter, producer and composer

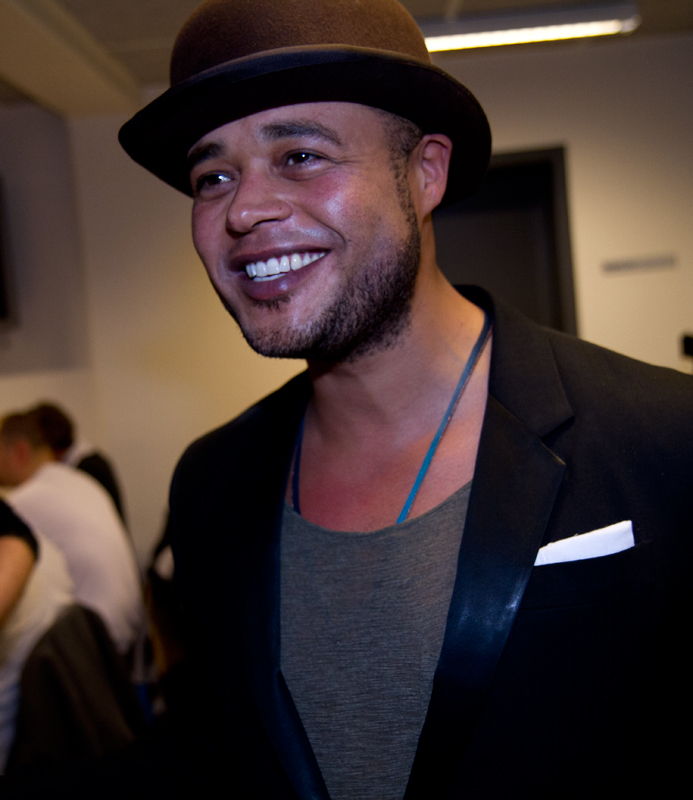
- Remee at Dansk Melodi Grand Prix 2012

Background information
- Also known as: Remee Sigvardt Jackman
- Born: Mikkel Johan Imer Sigvardt; 8 November 1974 (age 51); Frederiksberg, Denmark
- Genres: Pop; hip-hop; R&B
- Occupations: Rapper; songwriter; producer; composer
- Years active: 1989–present
- Formerly of: Sound of Seduction

Remee Sigvardt Jackman (né Mikkel Johan Imer Sigvardt; born 8 November 1974), better known as Remee, is a Danish rapper, songwriter, producer and composer.

== Career ==
Remee has written more than 60 hits and has sold over 25 million records. He has co-written several songs with Thomas Troelsen.

=== Early music career ===
Remee was a rapper in the pop group Sound of Seduction and in Thomas Blachman's jazz and hip-hop project in the early and mid-1990s. In 1998, Remee broke through as a producer/songwriter for the pop duo S.O.A.P, with the debut album Not Like Other Girls. At the Danish Grammy Awards, the group was honored with two prizes, and Remee was nominated for the Producer of the Year. In 1999, he wrote and co-produced "Let Love Be Love", sung by Juice, SOAP and Christina Undhjem, as well as Remee. The track is, according to DR, one of the most played songs ever on Danish radio.

In 2003, he helped write Jamelia's international hit "Superstar", which was originally released by Danish singer Christine Milton, and won him a British Ivor Novello Award. Later that year, he co-hosted the first Junior Eurovision Song Contest alongside Camilla Ottesen.

In 2005, Remee and Nicolai Seebach and Rasmus Seebach composed the tribute song for the victims of the Boxing Day tsunami. Remee, along with several Danish celebrities, performed the song "Hvor små vi er". The song went 13 times platinum and raised more than 3 million Danish kroner (500,000 US dollars) for the tsunami victims.

=== 2008–10: X Factor, Eurovision 2008 ===
In 2008, he became one of the original judges with Thomas Blachman and Lina Rafn searching for talent in the Danish version of the TV-show X-Factor. He mentored the Under 25s category, which consisted of Martin Hoberg Hedegaard, Laura Arensbak Kjaergaard and Basim Moujahid. All of his acts reached the semi-final, with Hedegaard and Kjaergaard finishing as winner and runner-up respectively.

The same year, he co-wrote the German entry for the Eurovision Song Contest 2008, "Disappear", performed by No Angels.

In 2009, Remee returned to the judging panel alongside Blachman and Rafn for the show's second season. Remee mentored the Groups category for his second season, which consisted of Alien Beat Club, Asian Sensation and Tårnhøj. Alien Beat Club reached the final, but lost out to Rafn's last act Linda Andrews. Remee continued as a judge for the third season, with Soulshock and Pernille Rosendahl replacing Blachman and Rafn. He mentored the Under 25s category, which consisted of Tine Midtgaard Madsen, Jesper Boesgaard and Anna "Faroe" Nygaard. Nygaard was eliminated in week 5 of the live shows, Boesgaard was eliminated in week 6 and Nygaard lost out to Thomas Ring Petersen, mentored by Rosendahl. Remee confirmed his departure after the final of season 3 and his replacement for the fourth season was Cutfather.

=== 2013–present: Return to X Factor ===
In 2013, Remee returned as a judge for the seventh season of X Factor alongside original fellow judges Thomas Blachman and Lina Rafn, replacing Anne Linnet. For his fourth year on the show, Remee was given the Over 23s category, which consisted of Lucy Mardou, Pernille Nordtorp and Steffen Gilmartin. Gilmartin was eliminated in week 4, Nortorp was eliminated in week 6 and Mardou lost out in the final to Anthony Jasmin, mentored by Blachman.

It was confirmed in August 2014 that Remee would return for season 8 in 2015. Remee won as winning mentor in season 8 with Emilie Esther, again in season 9 with Embrace and in season 10 with Morten Nørgaard.

== Personal life ==
At the age of 23, Remee had a daughter, Emma Imani.

He was in a relationship with Maria Leander from 2001 to 2008.

From 2009 to 2010, he dated Michala Kjær. He dated model Simona Popovic from 2010 to 2014.

At the end of 2012, Remee officially changed his name from Mikkel Johan Imer Sigvardt to Remee Sigvardt Jackman. Jackman is his biological father's name and Sigvardt is his adoptive father's name.

He started dating model Mathilde Gøhler in 2014. In 2015, they had a daughter. While celebrating his birthday on 11 November 2017, he proposed to Gøhler and she accepted.

== Discography ==
- Jamelia "Superstar"
- Beverley Knight "Keep This Fire Burning"
- Monrose "Hot Summer"
- No Angels "Disappear"
- Robyn "Don't Stop The Music", "Keep This Fire Burning"
- Sarah Connor "Under My Skin"
- BoA "Eat you up", "Just Like That"
- TVXQ "Mirotic"
- f(x) "Hot Summer", "Gangsta Boy"
- Super Junior "MONSTER"
- Bent Fabric "Jukebox", "Shake"
- Safri Duo "All the people in the world"
- C21 "All That I Want"
- Jokeren / L.O.C. / Niarn "Gravøl"
- Martin Hoberg Hedegaard "Show the World", "Report to the Dancefloor"
- S.O.A.P. "S.O.A.P. Is In The Air", "Like A Stone In The Water", "This Is How We Party", "Stand By You", "Not Like Other Girls", "Ladidi Ladida", "Mr. DJ"
- Cinema Bizarre "Forever or Never"
- Corbin Bleu "Deal with It" (with Jay Sean)
- Christine Milton "Superstar", "Whicketywhack", "So Addictive"
- Terri Walker "Whoopsie Daisy"
- The Saturdays "If This Is Love"
- S.O.S. "Welcome to My World", "Love Like 7", "Until Im Saticefied", "We could Have Been"
- Blue "Only Words I Know"
- Sarah Connor "Sexy As Hell"
- O-Town "We Fit Together"
- Diverse "Hvor Små Vi Er"
- Private "Killer on the Dancefloor"
- S Club 7 "Stand By You"
- Shayne Ward "Next To Me", "Stand By Your Side"
- Shaznay Lewis "On the Radio"
- Eye Q "The World Outside My Door"
- Lee Ryan "Real Love"
- SHINee "Love Like Oxygen", "Juliette" (with Jay Sean), "Forever or Never"
- Jeanette Biedermann "Undress to the Beat"
- Girls' Generation "Echo"
- EXO "History" (with Yoo Young-jin, Thomas Troelsen)
- 2YOON "Why Not" (with Mich Hansen, Keeley Hawkes, Nevil, Robert S, Thomas Troelsen)
- Anti Social Media "The Way You Are"
- Emilie Esther "Undiscovered"

=== Compilation albums ===
- Grænseløs Greatest (1999)

== Awards ==
- 2004: Ivor Novello Awards for Jamelia "Superstar".
- 2008: BMI Awards for Corbin Bleu "Deal with It".
- 2008: Comet Awards Germany "Song of the Year" for Monrose "Hot Summer".
- 2008: Eurovision Winner Germany for No Angels "Disappear".
- 2008: TV Awards Denmark - 'TV show of the year' for "X-factor".

Preceded by None (first contest)	Junior Eurovision Song Contest presenter 2003; With: Camilla Ottesen	Succeeded by Nadia Hasnaoui and Stian Barsnes Simonsen
