= 1982 in music =

This is a list of notable events in music from 1982, the year in which Michael Jackson released Thriller, which holds the title for the world's best selling album.

== Specific locations ==
- 1982 in British music
- 1982 in Japanese music
- 1982 in Norwegian music
- 1982 in Scandinavian music

== Specific genres ==
- 1982 in country music
- 1982 in heavy metal music
- 1982 in hip-hop music
- 1982 in jazz
- 1982 in progressive rock

== Events ==
=== January–March ===
- January 15 – K.C. and the Sunshine Band's Harry Wayne Casey is seriously injured in an automobile accident in Miami, Florida.|
- January 20 – Ozzy Osbourne bites the head off a live bat thrown at him during a performance in Des Moines, Iowa. He thought it was rubber.
- January 21 – B. B. King donates his personal record collection, which includes nearly 7,000 rare blues records, to the University of Mississippi's Center for the Study of Southern Culture.
- February 13 – A 300-pound (136 kg) gravestone from the grave of Lynyrd Skynyrd singer Ronnie Van Zant is stolen from an Orange Park, Florida, cemetery. Police find the gravestone two weeks later in a dry river bed.
- February 19 – Ozzy Osbourne is arrested after urinating on The Alamo, in San Antonio, Texas.
- February 20 – Pat Benatar marries her guitarist, Neil Giraldo, on the Hawaiian island of Maui.
- February 24 – The 24th Annual Grammy Awards are presented in Los Angeles, hosted by Quincy Jones (who wins a total of five awards). John Lennon and Yoko Ono's Double Fantasy (the final album released by Lennon in his lifetime) wins Album of the Year, while Kim Carnes' "Bette Davis Eyes" wins both Record of the Year and Song of the Year. Sheena Easton wins Best New Artist.
- February 27 – The D'Oyly Carte Opera Company gives its final performance at the Adelphi Theatre after more than 110 years.
- March 3 – The Mamas & the Papas begin a reunion tour with a show in the New York club The Other End with original members John Phillips and Denny Doherty, along with Mackenzie Phillips and Spanky McFarlane replacing Michelle Gilliam and Cass Elliot respectively.
- March 4 – Frank Zappa's son Dweezil and daughter Moon Unit form Fred Zeppelin.
- March 5 – Comedian and Blues Brother John Belushi is found dead of an apparent drug overdose in the Chateau Marmont in Los Angeles.
- March 18 – Teddy Pendergrass is severely injured in a car accident in Philadelphia. Pendergrass's injuries result in him being paralyzed from the chest down.
- March 19 – Ozzy Osbourne's lead guitarist, Randy Rhoads, is killed in a freak accident in Leesburg, Florida, when the plane in which he is riding buzzes Osbourne's tour bus and crashes into a house. The plane's pilot and a female passenger are also killed.
- March 28 – In Los Angeles, David Crosby is arrested for possession of Quaaludes and drug paraphernalia, driving under the influence of cocaine and carrying a concealed weapon.

=== April–August ===
- April 13 – David Crosby is arrested on drug charges for the second time in three weeks when Dallas police catch him preparing cocaine backstage before a show.
- April 15 – Billy Joel is seriously injured in a motorcycle accident in Long Island, New York. Joel spends over a month in the hospital undergoing physical therapy for his hand.
- April 17 – Johnny Cash hosts the US TV program Saturday Night Live, with Cash and Elton John and his classic band as the musical guests. Cash sings I Walk The Line, Folsom Prison Blues, Ring of Fire and Sunday Morning Coming Down. John sings Empty Garden (Hey Hey Johnny) and Ball and Chain. The latter would not appear on the NBC show again until 2011.
- April 24 – Germany wins the 27th annual Eurovision Song Contest, held in the Harrogate Conference Centre, North Yorkshire, with the song "Ein bißchen Frieden", sung by 17-year-old Nicole. She also records the song in English as "A Little Peace", which becomes the 500th chart-topping single in the UK.
- April 26
  - Rod Stewart is car-jacked in Los Angeles. Stewart loses his $50,000 Porsche to the mugger, but is not hurt. The car is recovered several days later.
  - Joe Strummer goes into hiding, forcing The Clash to postpone their U.K. tour.Salewicz, Chris (2006). Redemption Song: The Ballad of Joe Strummer. New York: Macmillan. p. 303. ISBN 978-0-571-21178-4. OCLC 76794852.
- May 14 – The first Prince's Trust charity concert is held at the National Exhibition Centre in Birmingham. With the Prince of Wales (later Charles III) in attendance, Status Quo, becomes the first contemporary band to play to British royalty.
- May 18 – Three weeks after disappearing, Joe Strummer and his girlfriend are found living in Paris, two days after they ran the Paris Marathon.
- May 21 – Queen release their tenth studio album, Hot Space, to immense critical outcry. The decision to make a dance-pop album with prominent disco influences at the height of American backlash against the latter genre renders the band a pariah in the United States, and their shift from traditional rock alienates their fans in the United Kingdom. Queen would not recover from the resulting backlash in the United Kingdom until after their Live Aid performance in 1985, while they would remain unpopular in the United States until after Freddie Mercury's death in 1991.
- May 23 – Pink Floyd – The Wall, a film adaptation of Pink Floyd's 1979 album The Wall, is premiered at the Cannes Film Festival; the film's wide release would later begin on July 15.
- May 29 – Duran Duran's album Rio peaks at number 2 on the UK Albums Chart in its second week on the chart and will remain on the chart for almost two years.
- June 16 – James Honeyman-Scott dies of heart failure caused by cocaine intolerance. He is 25 years old.
- June 19 – Amy Grant marries Gary Chapman.
- July – The first known fully staged performance of Jean-Philippe Rameau's tragédie lyrique Les Boréades (1763) is given by John Eliot Gardiner at the Aix-en-Provence Festival.
- July 3 – ABC's debut album The Lexicon of Love enters the UK Albums Chart at number 1 and remain at the top position for four consecutive weeks.
- July 4 – Ozzy Osbourne marries his manager Sharon Arden in Maui, Hawaii.
- July 21 – A second Prince's Trust charity concert is held at the Dominion Theatre in London. Performers include Pete Townshend, Robert Plant, Madness, Phil Collins, Joan Armatrading and Kate Bush.
- August 17 – In Langenhagen near Hanover, Germany begins the first mass production of the compact disc.

=== September–December ===
- September 3–5 – The first US Festival is held over Labor Day Weekend near Devore, California. The Police, Tom Petty & the Heartbreakers, Fleetwood Mac, Grateful Dead, Talking Heads and The B-52's are among the many performers.
- October 1 – The first compact discs appear in music stores in Japan.
- November 1 – The breakup of the band Blondie is announced publicly.
- November 5 – The first edition of The Tube is broadcast on Channel 4 in the UK. Guests on the first programme include The Jam, making their last live TV appearance together.
- November 6 – Tears for Fears first hit single "Mad World" peaks at number 3 on the UK Singles Chart during its 17-week chart run.
- November 21 – Joni Mitchell marries producer and bassist Larry Klein in Malibu, California.
- November 25–27 – The Jamaica World Music Festival is held in Montego Bay, Jamaica. Acts over the three-day festival include Peter Tosh, Rick James, The Clash, Grateful Dead, Aretha Franklin and, in their final show before disbanding, Squeeze.
- November 27 – The 11th OTI Festival, held at the Coliseo Amauta in Lima, Peru, is won by the song "Puedes contar conmigo", written by Luis Gerardo Tovar and Carlos Moreán, and performed by Grupo Unicornio representing Venezuela.
- November 27 and 28 - Rita Lee and Roberto de Carvalho previews their upcoming Tour Brasil 83 with two megashows at Ginásio do Ibirapuera in São Paulo, which were recorded for TV Globo's year-end special O Circo.
- November 29 – Sena Jurinac appears on stage for the last time, with the Vienna State Opera.
- November 30 – Michael Jackson releases his sixth studio album Thriller, which would go on to be the greatest selling album of all time at 70 million units sold worldwide.

== Bands formed ==
- See Musical groups established in 1982

== Bands disbanded ==
- See Category:Musical groups disestablished in 1982

== Albums released ==
In the US, the RIAA stated that 2,630 albums, 2,710 cassettes and 2,285 singles were released.

=== January ===
Day	Album	Artist	Notes
11	Wasn't Tomorrow Wonderful?	The Waitresses	–
15	All for a Song	Barbara Dickson	–
18	Mystical Adventures	Jean-Luc Ponty	–
19	How Could Hell Be Any Worse?	Bad Religion	–
27	Mesopotamia	The B-52's	EP
29	Friends	Shalamar	–
29	Picture This	Huey Lewis and the News	–
?	Another Day/Another Dollar	Gang of Four	Compilation
?	Anyone Can See	Irene Cara	–
?	Breaking Point	Central Line	–
?	The David Frizzell and Shelly West Album	David Frizzell and Shelly West	–
?	Flex Your Head	Various Artists	–
?	Kasim	Kasim Sulton	–
?	Objects of Desire	Michael Franks	–
?	Oriental Beat	Hanoi Rocks	–
?	Repercussion	The dB's	–
?	Shadows	Gordon Lightfoot	–
?	The Sisters	Sister Sledge	–
?	Somewhere over China	Jimmy Buffett	–
?	Southern Comfort	Conway Twitty	–
?	Streetheart	Streetheart	–
?	White Heart	White Heart	-
?	Yes It's You Lady	Smokey Robinson	–

=== February ===
Day	Album	Artist	Notes
5	Bad Brains	Bad Brains	–
5	Celebration	Simple Minds	Compilation
10	Bobbie Sue	The Oak Ridge Boys	–
12	English Settlement	XTC	–
16	Beautiful Vision	Van Morrison	–
16	The Concert in Central Park	Simon & Garfunkel	Live
23	The Blue Mask	Lou Reed	–
24	Swing to the Right	Utopia	–
25	Mountain Music	Alabama	–
26	2XS	Nazareth	–
26	Set	Thompson Twins	–
?	Baal	David Bowie	Soundtrack
?	Black on Black	Waylon Jennings	–
?	Chase the Dragon	Magnum	–
?	Crumbling the Antiseptic Beauty	Felt	–
?	Gamma 3	Gamma	–
?	Green Light	Bonnie Raitt	–
?	Growing in the Dark	Glass Moon	–
?	Just Another Day in Paradise	Bertie Higgins	–
?	Mechanix	UFO	–
?	Nick the Knife	Nick Lowe	–
?	One from the Heart	Tom Waits and Crystal Gayle	Soundtrack
?	Pelican West	Haircut One Hundred	–
?	Seasons of the Heart	John Denver	–
?	Times of Our Lives	Judy Collins	–
?	Weather Report	Weather Report	–
?	You Can't Hide Your Love Forever	Orange Juice	–

=== March ===
Day	Album	Artist	Notes
4	Wild in the Streets	Circle Jerks	–
5	Windows	Charlie Daniels Band	–
8	Blackout	Scorpions	–
8	Hex Enduction Hour	The Fall	–
12	Diamond	Spandau Ballet	–
12	The Gift	The Jam	–
15	Shoot Out the Lights	Richard and Linda Thompson	–
18	Asia	Asia	Debut
19	Batteries Not Included	After the Fire	–
19	Five Miles Out	Mike Oldfield	–
22	Alligator Woman	Cameo	–
22	Reel Music	The Beatles	Compilation
23	Success Hasn't Spoiled Me Yet	Rick Springfield	–
24	The Name of This Band Is Talking Heads	Talking Heads	Live
24	Only Theatre of Pain	Christian Death	Debut
25	The Blurred Crusade	The Church	Australia
26	The Anvil	Visage	–
26	Bill Wyman	Bill Wyman	–
29	The Number of the Beast	Iron Maiden	–
29	Angst in My Pants	Sparks	–
?	Always on My Mind	Willie Nelson	–
?	Ambient 4: On Land	Brian Eno	–
?	Branigan	Laura Branigan	–
?	Brilliance	Atlantic Starr	–
?	The Early Tapes	Level 42	Recorded in 1980
?	Filth Hounds of Hades	Tank	Debut
?	Fun Boy Three	Fun Boy Three	–
?	Grasshopper	JJ Cale	–
?	New Britain	Whitehouse	–
?	One to One	Carole King	–
?	Sonic Youth	Sonic Youth	Debut/EP
?	The Tunes of Two Cities	The Residents	–
?	V Deep	The Boomtown Rats	–
?	Walk Among Us	The Misfits	Debut

=== April ===
Day	Album	Artist	Notes
1	Toto IV	Toto	
2	Cat People	Giorgio Moroder	Soundtrack
5	All Four One	The Motels	–
8	D.E. 7th	Dave Edmunds	–
9	A Flock of Seagulls	A Flock of Seagulls	Debut
9	Broadsword and the Beast	Jethro Tull	UK
9	Jump Up!	Elton John	–
12	American Fool	John Cougar	–
14	Straight Between the Eyes	Rainbow	–
14	Friends in Love	Dionne Warwick	–
15	Metal on Metal	Anvil	–
16	1+9+8+2	Status Quo	–
19	Diver Down	Van Halen	
19	Extraterrestrial Live	Blue Öyster Cult	Live
19	Big Science	Laurie Anderson	Debut
23	The Single Factor	Camel	
23	Complete Madness	Madness	Compilation
23	After the Snow	Modern English	–
26	Tug of War	Paul McCartney	–
26	Are You Ready	Bucks Fizz	–
28	Marshall Crenshaw	Marshall Crenshaw	–
?	Abominog	Uriah Heep	–
?	Album – Generic Flipper	Flipper	Debut
?	Revelations	Killing Joke	–
?	Circus Animals	Cold Chisel	–
?	Four Cuts EP	Diamond Head	EP
?	Heartbreak Express	Dolly Parton	–
?	High Notes	Hank Williams, Jr.	–
?	Iron Fist	Motörhead	–
?	Jinx	Rory Gallagher	–
?	Maybe It's Live	Robert Palmer	Live +4 studio tracks
?	A New Chapter of Dub	Aswad	–
?	Rhythm of Youth	Men Without Hats	–
?	Time and Tide	Split Enz	–
?	White Eagle	Tangerine Dream	–

=== May ===
Day	Album	Artist	Notes
1	Age to Age	Amy Grant	–
3	Ship Arriving Too Late to Save a Drowning Witch	Frank Zappa	–
4	Hot Space	Queen	
4	Stevie Wonder's Original Musiquarium	Stevie Wonder	Compilation
4	Pornography	The Cure	
7	Wiped Out	Raven	–
10	The Eagle Has Landed	Saxon	Live
10	The Golden Age of Wireless	Thomas Dolby	Debut
10	Junkyard	The Birthday Party	–
10	Rio	Duran Duran	–
13	Throwin' Down	Rick James	–
14	Sulk	The Associates	–
14	Combat Rock	The Clash	–
14	Church of Hawkwind	Hawkwind	–
14	Pinky Blue	Altered Images	–
16	The Record	Fear	Debut
19	One Down	Material	–
20	Vinyl Confessions	Kansas	
20	Private Audition	Heart	
21	Coney Hatch	Coney Hatch	–
21	Fabrique	Fashion	–
24	The Hunter	Blondie	–
26	3rd from the Sun	Chrome	–
28	Avalon	Roxy Music	–
28	I Paralyze	Cher	–
28	No Fun Aloud	Glenn Frey	–
?	2x45	Cabaret Voltaire	–
?	Animation	Jon Anderson	
?	D. Train	D. Train	–
?	Eye in the Sky	The Alan Parsons Project	–
?	Sheffield Steel	Joe Cocker	–
?	12 Greatest Hits, Vol. II	Neil Diamond	Compilation
?	Get It on Credit	Toronto	–
?	Individuals	Sunnyboys	–
?	The Last of the Mohicans	Bow Wow Wow	EP
?	Let Me Rock You	Peter Criss	–
?	Now and Forever	Air Supply	–
?	The One Giveth, the Count Taketh Away	William Bootsy Collins	–
?	One on One	Cheap Trick	–
?	Quiet Lies	Juice Newton	–
?	Special Forces	38 Special	–
?	Street Opera	Ashford & Simpson	–
?	Sweets From a Stranger	Squeeze	–
?	Time Pieces: The Best of Eric Clapton	Eric Clapton	Compilation
?	Tropical Gangsters	Kid Creole and the Coconuts	–
?	Tuckerized	Marshall Tucker Band	–
?	World Radio	Leo Sayer	Studio

=== June ===
Day	Album	Artist	Notes
1	Still Life	The Rolling Stones	Live
3	Strait from the Heart	George Strait	–
4	Three Sides Live	Genesis	Live
7	Battle Hymns	Manowar	–
7	Built for Speed	Stray Cats	–
7	Chicago 16	Chicago	–
7	Screaming Blue Murder	Girlschool	–
8	Eye of the Tiger	Survivor	–
14	All the Best Cowboys Have Chinese Eyes	Pete Townshend	–
14	Metal Massacre	Various Artists	–
15	Abracadabra	Steve Miller Band	–
15	Killers	Kiss	–
17	Nugent	Ted Nugent	–
18	Beat	King Crimson	–
21	The Lexicon of Love	ABC	Debut
21	Daylight Again	Crosby, Stills & Nash	–
22	Nothing to Fear	Oingo Boingo	–
24	Stink	The Replacements	EP
25	Night and Day	Joe Jackson	
28	Before I Forget	Jon Lord	–
?	The Changeling	Toyah	–
?	Good Trouble	REO Speedwagon	–
?	Live It Up	David Johansen	Live
?	The Love That Whirls (Diary of a Thinking Heart)	Bill Nelson	–
?	No Control	Eddie Money	–
?	Somewhere in the Stars	Rosanne Cash	–
?	Sunshine Dream	The Beach Boys	Compilation
?	Unlimited	Reba McEntire	–

=== July ===
Day	Album	Artist	Notes
1	Screaming for Vengeance	Judas Priest	US
2	Mirage	Fleetwood Mac	
2	Pictures at Eleven	Robert Plant	
2	Billy Idol	Billy Idol	Solo Debut
2	Imperial Bedroom	Elvis Costello and the Attractions	–
9	Let Me Tickle Your Fancy	Jermaine Jackson	–
12	The Party's Over	Talk Talk	Debut
16	The Envoy	Warren Zevon	–
19	Donna Summer	Donna Summer	–
20	Vacation	The Go-Go's	–
23	Best Little Whorehouse in Texas Soundtrack	Various Artists	Soundtrack
23	Emotions in Motion	Billy Squier	–
26	Jump to It	Aretha Franklin	–
26	Love and Dancing	The Human League	Remix
29	So Excited!	Pointer Sisters	–
30	Fast Times at Ridgemont High	Various Artists	Soundtrack
?	Highway Song Live	Blackfoot	Live
?	Juggernaut	Frank Marino	–
?	The Lords of the New Church	The Lords of the New Church	Debut
?	Love Will Turn You Around	Kenny Rogers	–
?	Psychopathia Sexualis	Whitehouse	–
?	Sons of Beaches	Australian Crawl	–
?	TV Party	Black Flag	EP
?	Under the Big Black Sun	X	–

=== August ===
Day	Album	Artist	Notes
3	If That's What It Takes	Michael McDonald	Debut
11	Vanity 6	Vanity 6	–
12	Rough Diamonds	Bad Company	US
13	I Can't Stand Still	Don Henley	–
17	Art of Control	Peter Frampton	–
20	Upstairs at Eric's	Yazoo	
20	The Cage	Tygers of Pan Tang	
21	Amore	Alessandra Mussolini	
23	Hughes/Thrall	Hughes/Thrall	–
24	Black Tiger	Y&T	–
24	Chronic Town	R.E.M.	EP
25	Zipper Catches Skin	Alice Cooper	
25	What Time Is It?	The Time	–
27	Rock in a Hard Place	Aerosmith	–
27	Heartlight	Neil Diamond	–
?	Ache	You've Got Foetus on Your Breath	–
?	Bad to the Bone	George Thorogood & the Destroyers	–
?	View from the Ground	America	–
?	Fiction	The Comsat Angels	–
?	The Hottest Night of the Year	Anne Murray	–
?	Metal	Manilla Road	–
?	Music for a New Society	John Cale	–
?	Play by Numbers	Little Heroes	–
?	Shango	Santana	–
?	Talking Back to the Night	Steve Winwood	–
?	A Taste of Yesterday's Wine	Merle Haggard and George Jones	–
?	Too-Rye-Ay	Dexy's Midnight Runners	–
?	The Unexpected Guest	Demon	–

=== September ===
Day	Album	Artist	Notes
1	Garlands	Cocteau Twins	Debut
3	In the Heat of the Night	Imagination	
3	Olivia's Greatest Hits Vol. 2	Olivia Newton-John	Compilation +2 new tracks
6	The Adventures of Johnny Cash	Johnny Cash	–
6	Primitive Man	Icehouse	–
7	Acting Very Strange	Mike Rutherford	–
7	As One	Kool & The Gang	–
8	Voyeur	Kim Carnes	–
9	Signals	Rush	–
10	Cut	Golden Earring	–
10	I, Assassin	Gary Numan	–
10	Peter Gabriel	Peter Gabriel	aka Security
10	Silk Electric	Diana Ross	–
10	Something's Going On	Frida	
13	The Dreaming	Kate Bush	–
17	New Gold Dream (81-82-83-84)	Simple Minds	–
17	The Philip Lynott Album	Philip Lynott	–
18	Under the Blade	Twisted Sister	–
20	Ghost Town	Poco	–
20	Miami	The Gun Club	–
21	Forever, For Always, For Love	Luther Vandross	–
21	Janet Jackson	Janet Jackson	Debut
23	The Nylon Curtain	Billy Joel	–
24	Forever Now	The Psychedelic Furs	
24	Love over Gold	Dire Straits	–
27	A Broken Frame	Depeche Mode	–
27	Get Closer	Linda Ronstadt	–
27	Room to Live	The Fall	–
27	UB44	UB40	–
28	Heartbreaker	Dionne Warwick	–
30	Nebraska	Bruce Springsteen	–
?	Call of the West	Wall of Voodoo	–
?	Death Penalty	Witchfinder General	–
?	Dream Maker	Void	–
?	Faith / Void Split	Conway Twitty	–
?	Gowan	Larry Gowan	–
?	High Adventure	Kenny Loggins	–
?	Ice Cream for Crow	Captain Beefheart	–
?	Madness, Money & Music	Sheena Easton	–
?	Magic	Gillan	–
?	Pressin' On	Billy Preston	–
?	The Pursuit of Accidents	Level 42	–
?	Scandal	Scandal	EP
?	Song of the Bailing Man	Pere Ubu	–
?	Zombie Birdhouse	Iggy Pop	–

=== October ===
Day	Album	Artist	Notes
1	The Nightfly	Donald Fagen	–
3	The Message	Grandmaster Flash and the Furious Five	–
4	Restless and Wild	Accept	–
4	H_{2}O	Hall & Oates	–
4	Winds of Change	Jefferson Starship	–
6	Lionel Richie	Lionel Richie	Solo Debut
8	The Rise & Fall	Madness	–
11	Vs.	Mission of Burma	–
14	Zapp II	Zapp	–
15	Borrowed Time	Diamond Head	
15	Quartet	Ultravox	–
18	In the Mood for Something Rude	Foghat	–
22	Cha	Jo Jo Zep & The Falcons	–
22	The Dollar Album	Dollar	–
22	The Sky's Gone Out	Bauhaus	
23	All Fall Down	The Sound	
25	Creatures of the Night	Kiss	
27	1999	Prince	–
29	...Famous Last Words...	Supertramp	
29	Choose Your Masques	Hawkwind	–
29	Get Nervous	Pat Benatar	–
?	All by Myself	Rikk Agnew	–
?	Assault Attack	The Michael Schenker Group	–
?	Beautiful	The Reels	–
?	Coup d'État	Plasmatics	–
?	Eagles Greatest Hits, Vol. 2	Eagles	Compilation
?	Friend or Foe	Adam Ant	–
?	The Days of Wine and Roses	The Dream Syndicate	–
?	Heartbreaker	Dionne Warwick	–
?	Keep On Doing	The Roches	–
?	Kissing to Be Clever	Culture Club	–
?	Last Date	Emmylou Harris	Live
?	Kim Mitchell	Kim Mitchell	–
?	An Officer and a Gentleman	Various Artists	Soundtrack
?	Power of the Hunter	Tank	–
?	Shabooh Shoobah	INXS	–
?	Shuttered Room	The Fixx	–
?	Spring Session M	Missing Persons	–
?	Strawberries	The Damned	–
?	Twin Barrels Burning	Wishbone Ash	–
?	Wild Things Run Fast	Joni Mitchell	–
?	Word of Mouth	Toni Basil	–
?	WWII	Waylon Jennings and Willie Nelson	–
?	The Youth of Today	Musical Youth	–

=== November ===
Day	Album	Artist	Notes
1	Black Metal	Venom	–
1	Living My Life	Grace Jones	–
2	Long After Dark	Tom Petty and the Heartbreakers	–
2	It's Alright (I See Rainbows)	Yoko Ono	–
5	Hello, I Must Be Going!	Phil Collins	–
5	A Kiss in the Dreamhouse	Siouxsie and The Banshees	–
5	Gone Troppo	George Harrison	–
8	Midnight Love	Marvin Gaye	–
8	I Could Rule the World if I Could only Get the Parts	The Waitresses	EP
8	The Singles: The First Ten Years	ABBA	Compilation
8	The John Lennon Collection	John Lennon	Compilation
12	Difficult Shapes & Passive Rhythms, Some People Think It's Fun to Entertain	China Crisis	Debut
12	Showtime!	The J. Geils Band	Live
13	The Lee Aaron Project	Lee Aaron	–
15	The Ever Popular Tortured Artist Effect	Todd Rundgren	–
15	Saints & Sinners	Whitesnake	–
17	Chaka Khan	Chaka Khan	–
19	Speak of the Devil	Ozzy Osbourne	Live
24	8th Wonder	The Sugarhill Gang	–
26	Coda	Led Zeppelin	Recorded 1970–'79
29	Thriller	Michael Jackson	–
?	10, 9, 8, 7, 6, 5, 4, 3, 2, 1	Midnight Oil	–
?	Absolutely Live	Rod Stewart	Live
?	Computer Games	George Clinton	–
?	Dawn Patrol	Night Ranger	–
?	Don't Play with Fire	Peabo Bryson	–
?	Going Where the Lonely Go	Merle Haggard	–
?	Here Comes the Night	Barry Manilow	–
?	The High and the Mighty	Donnie Iris	–
?	Identity Crisis	Sweet	–
?	Killer on the Rampage	Eddy Grant	–
?	New Directions	Tavares	–
?	Oh, No! It's Devo	Devo	–
?	Pearls II	Elkie Brooks	–
?	Plastic Surgery Disasters	Dead Kennedys	–
?	Rip It Up	Orange Juice	–
?	Rita Lee & Roberto de Carvalho	Rita Lee & Roberto de Carvalho	–
?	Run for the Roses	Jerry Garcia	–

=== December ===
Day	Album	Artist	Notes
6	Three Lock Box	Sammy Hagar	
10	Dig the New Breed	The Jam	Live
13	The Distance	Bob Seger and the Silver Bullet Band	–
29	Trans	Neil Young	–
30	Beatitude	Ric Ocasek	–
?	Slade on Stage	Slade	Live
?	Out of Reason	Pel Mel	–
?	Virgin Steele	Virgin Steele	–
?	White Heat	Dusty Springfield	–
?	The Winning Hand	Willie Nelson, Kris Kristofferson, Brenda Lee & Dolly Parton	–

=== Release date unknown ===
- And You Thought You Were Normal – Nash the Slash
- Arias & Symphonies – Spoons
- Back from Samoa – Angry Samoans
- Barry Live in Britain – Barry Manilow – Live
- Bean-Spill – The Minutemen – EP
- Beasts (EP) – Sex Gang Children
- Before a Word is Said – Alan Gowen, Phil Miller, Richard Sinclair, Trevor Tomkins
- Boomerang – Shoes
- Breaking the Chains – Dokken – original mix
- Chris Rea – Chris Rea
- Christ – The Album – Crass
- Comeback – Eric Burdon
- The Concerts in China – Jean-Michel Jarre
- Deliver Us from Evil – Budgie
- D.M.Z. – Resurrection Band
- Dr. John Plays Mac Rebennack, Vol. 1 – Dr. John
- Dreamgirls: Original Broadway Cast Album – Various Artists
- Drumming the Beating Heart – Eyeless in Gaza
- D.S. al Coda – National Health
- Echoes of an Era – Chaka Khan
- Eddie Murphy – Eddie Murphy
- Electric Rendezvous – Al Di Meola
- Ella à Nice – Ella Fitzgerald
- Enter K – Peter Hammill
- Farover – Burning Spear
- Fast Women and Slow Horses – Dr. Feelgood
- The Fittest of the Fittest – Burning Spear
- Flieg' Vogel flieg – Hans-Joachim Roedelius
- Forging Ahead – Bad Manners
- Gap Band IV – The Gap Band
- Garista – Zoviet France
- The Getaway – Chris de Burgh
- Glassworks – Philip Glass
- Good Clean Fun – Bonnie Hayes
- The Great Twenty-Eight – Chuck Berry – Compilation
- Groovy Decay – Robyn Hitchcock
- Here Today – David Grisman
- Heartbeats and Triggers – Translator
- Homotopy to Marie – Nurse With Wound
- Hour Live – Toots & The Maytals
- Humans Only – Earthstar
- ...If I Die, I Die – Virgin Prunes
- In the Name of Love – Thompson Twins
- Inside – Ronnie Milsap
- Kansuigyo – Miyuki Nakajima
- Kenny G – Kenny G
- Ladies of the Eighties – A Taste of Honey
- Leichenschrei – SPK
- Levon Helm – Levon Helm
- Life in the Jungle – The Shadows
- Live at Abbey Road – The Shadows
- Love Over and Over – Kate and Anna McGarrigle
- Main Attraction – Suzi Quatro
- Man Parrish – Man Parrish
- Meat Puppets – Meat Puppets
- Milo Goes to College – Descendents
- Mondialement vôtre – Dalida
- Money Talks – Trooper
- More Power To Ya – Petra
- Night Birds – Shakatak
- Night Nurse – Gregory Isaacs
- No Stranger to Danger – Payolas
- No Turning Back:Live – DeGarmo and Key – Live
- Nona – Nona Hendryx
- Nothing Can Stop Us – Robert Wyatt – Compilation
- Now Then... – Stiff Little Fingers
- Now You See Me...Now You Don't – Cliff Richard
- Objects of Desire – Michael Franks
- Old Friends - Roger Miller & Willie Nelson
- Off the Record – Neil Innes
- Offene Türen – Hans-Joachim Roedelius
- Offering – Axe
- On Rock – Daniel Band
- One Night at Budokan – Michael Schenker Group – Live
- One Vice at a Time – Krokus
- Opus X – Chilliwack
- The Other Woman – Ray Parker Jr.
- Pale Hands I Loved So Well – Eyeless in Gaza
- Ping Pong over the Abyss – The 77s
- Pleasure Victim – Berlin
- Poet in My Window – Nanci Griffith
- Por Amor – Menudo
- Power Play – April Wine
- Prairie Serenade – Riders in the Sky
- Press the Eject and Give Me the Tape – Bauhaus – Live
- Pure and Natural – T-Connection
- Rêveries No. 2 – Richard Clayderman
- Ruff Cuts EP – Twisted Sister
- Scatterlings – Juluka
- Select – Kim Wilde
- Sleepwalking – Gerry Rafferty
- Songs of the Free – Gang of Four
- Special Beat Service – The Beat
- Spécial Dalida – Dalida
- Speech and Music (Parole et musique) – Pierre Schaeffer
- Stand by Your Man (EP) – Motörhead & Wendy O. Williams
- Tenebrae – Simonetti-Morante-Pignatelli (Goblin) – Soundtrack
- Tough – Kurtis Blow
- Trance – Chris & Cosey
- Troops of Tomorrow – The Exploited
- Truce – Jack Bruce and Robin Trower
- Turn It Loud – Headpins
- Underwater Kites – The Modern Art
- Vandenberg – Vandenberg
- The Very Best of Rufus Featuring Chaka Khan – Rufus – Compilation
- Wasted Youth – Girl
- We Are...The League – Anti-Nowhere League
- Windsong – Randy Crawford
- Word and Music – Hank Marvin
- Work of Heart – Roy Harper

== Biggest hit singles ==
The following songs achieved the highest chart positions in the charts of 1982.

#	Artist	Title	Year	Country	Chart Entries
1	Survivor	Eye of the Tiger	1982	(United States)	UK 1 - Jul 1982 (27 weeks), US Billboard 1 - Jun 1982 (25 weeks), US CashBox 1 of 1982, US Radio 1 of 1982 (peak 1 18 weeks), Canada 1 - Jun 1982 (16 weeks), Norway 1 - Aug 1982 (22 weeks), Australia 1 of 1982, Eire 1 for 3 weeks - Sep 1982, Canada RPM 1 for 6 weeks - Jul 1982, Australia 1 for 6 weeks - Sep 1982, Springbok 1 - Jul 1982 (21 weeks), Spain 1 for 1 week - Sep 1982, US 2 X Platinum (certified by RIAA in Oct 1994), US BB 2 of 1982, ARC 2 of 1982 (peak 1 18 weeks), Holland 2 - Sep 1982 (11 weeks), Austria 2 - Sep 1982 (4 months), Belgium 2 - Oct 1982 (9 weeks), Canada 2 of 1982, South Africa 2 of 1982, Oscar in 1982 (film 'Rocky III') (Nominated), Golden Globe in 1982 (film 'Rocky III') (Nominated), France (SNEP) 3 - Nov 1982 (4 months), UK Gold (certified by BPI in Sep 1982), Sweden (alt) 5 - Aug 1982 (21 weeks), Switzerland 6 - Aug 1982 (31 weeks), France 7 - Jan 1983 (1 week), POP 7 of 1982, WABC NY 12 of 1982, ODK Germany 13 - Sep 1982 (30 weeks), Germany 18 - Jan 1983 (5 months), Scrobulate 20 of 80s, Billboard 50th song 21, Brazil 23 of 1982, Italy 23 of 1982, 55th Billboard 100 23 (1982), Poland 24 - Jul 1982 (4 weeks), Billboard100 24, France (InfoDisc) 32 of the 1980s (peak 3, 38 weeks, 873k sales estimated, 1982), Europe 46 of the 1980s (1982), UK Songs 2013-23 peak 65 - Feb 2013 (3 weeks), OzNet 82, Holland free40 90 of 1982, UKMIX 436, Global 33 (5 M sold) - 1982
2	Joan Jett & The Blackhearts	I Love Rock 'n' Roll	1982	(United States)	US Billboard 1 - Feb 1982 (20 weeks), Record World 1 - 1982, Canada 1 - Jan 1982 (16 weeks), Holland 1 - Apr 1982 (9 weeks), Sweden (alt) 1 - Jun 1982 (21 weeks), Canada RPM 1 for 8 weeks - Mar 1982, Canada 1 of 1982, New Zealand 1 for 4 weeks - Jun 1982, Australia 1 for 5 weeks - May 1982, Springbok 1 - Apr 1982 (19 weeks), Grammy Hall of Fame in 2016 (1982), Poland 2 - May 1982 (8 weeks), Belgium 2 - Apr 1982 (9 weeks), US Platinum (certified by RIAA in Sep 1982), US BB 3 of 1982, Switzerland 3 - Mar 1982 (11 weeks), UK 4 - Apr 1982 (10 weeks), ARC 4 of 1982 (peak 1 17 weeks), US Radio 4 of 1982 (peak 1 14 weeks), POP 4 of 1982, US CashBox 5 of 1982, Austria 5 - May 1982 (2 months), Germany 6 - Apr 1982 (4 months), ODK Germany 6 - Apr 1982 (23 weeks) (7 weeks in top 10), France (SNEP) 7 - Jul 1982 (2 months), Australia 7 of 1982, South Africa 7 of 1982, WABC NY 9 of 1982, France 10 - Mar 1982 (1 week), nuTsie 20 of 1980s, Brazil 35 of 1982, Billboard 50th song 56, 55th Billboard 100 65 (1982), Billboard100 68, KROQ 71 of 1982, France (InfoDisc) 166 of the 1990s (peak 4, 29 weeks, 900k sales estimated, 1982), RIAA 177, Acclaimed 295 (1982), Germany 348 of the 1980s (peak 6 12 weeks), TheQ 463, Rolling Stone 484, UK Silver (certified by BPI in Jun 1982), Party 80 of 1999, one of the Rock and Roll Hall of Fame 500
3	Culture Club	Do You Really Want to Hurt Me	1982	(United Kingdom)	UK 1 - Sep 1982 (19 weeks), Canada 1 - Dec 1982 (17 weeks), Sweden (alt) 1 - Dec 1982 (17 weeks), Austria 1 - Jan 1983 (5 months), Switzerland 1 - Nov 1982 (14 weeks), Belgium 1 - Nov 1982 (8 weeks), Germany 1 - Jan 1983 (5 months), ODK Germany 1 - Nov 1982 (26 weeks) (7 weeks at number 1) (15 weeks in top 10), Eire 1 for 1 week - Oct 1982, Canada RPM 1 for 2 weeks - Feb 1983, Australia 1 for 6 weeks - Dec 1982, Europe 1 for 5 weeks - Jan 1983, France 1 for 4 weeks - Feb 1983, Germany 1 for 7 weeks - Dec 1982, US Billboard 2 - Dec 1982 (24 weeks), Holland 2 - Oct 1982 (10 weeks), France (SNEP) 2 - Dec 1982 (4 months), Norway 2 - Dec 1982 (17 weeks), Poland 2 - Jan 1983 (8 weeks), Canada 2 of 1983, UK Gold (certified by BPI in Oct 1982), Germany Gold (certified by BMieV in 1983), France 8 - Jan 1983 (1 week), US CashBox 10 of 1983, US BB 11 of 1983, Springbok 11 - Feb 1983 (11 weeks), KROQ 11 of 1983, Italy 13 of 1983, ARC 16 of 1983 (peak 2 16 weeks), US Radio 16 of 1983 (peak 2 12 weeks), Brazil 20 of 1983, POP 20 of 1983, Australia 22 of 1983, France (InfoDisc) 24 of the 1980s (peak 1, 25 weeks, 1,040k sales estimated, 1982), Germany 24 of the 1980s (peak 1 17 weeks), nuTsie 95 of 1980s, Acclaimed 476 (1982), UKMIX 646, RYM 93 of 1982, Guardian Pop 61
4	Paul McCartney & Stevie Wonder	Ebony and Ivory	1982	(United States) (United Kingdom)	UK 1 - Apr 1982 (10 weeks), US Billboard 1 - Apr 1982 (19 weeks), Canada 1 - Apr 1982 (14 weeks), Norway 1 - Apr 1982 (18 weeks), Belgium 1 - Apr 1982 (10 weeks), Germany 1 - May 1982 (5 months), ODK Germany 1 - May 1982 (22 weeks) (5 weeks at number 1) (13 weeks in top 10), Eire 1 for 3 weeks - Apr 1982, Canada RPM 1 for 5 weeks - May 1982, Germany 1 for 5 weeks - Jun 1982, Spain 1 for 1 week - Jun 1982, Sweden (alt) 2 - Apr 1982 (21 weeks), Switzerland 2 - Apr 1982 (12 weeks), Grammy in 1982 (Nominated), Holland 3 - Apr 1982 (9 weeks), Austria 3 - May 1982 (5 months), Canada 3 of 1982, Springbok 3 - May 1982 (13 weeks), US BB 4 of 1982, US CashBox 4 of 1982, Poland 4 - May 1982 (7 weeks), US Gold (certified by RIAA in Jun 1982), UK Gold (certified by BPI in May 1982), WABC NY 5 of 1982, France (SNEP) 5 - Jun 1982 (2 months), ARC 7 of 1982 (peak 1 16 weeks), US Radio 7 of 1982 (peak 1 12 weeks), Italy 9 of 1982, Switzerland 10 of 1982, Brazil 12 of 1982, Australia 20 of 1982, Germany 49 of the 1980s (peak 1 16 weeks), Billboard 50th song 59, 55th Billboard 100 69 (1982), Billboard100 73, Holland free40 100 of 1982, France (InfoDisc) 149 of the 1980s (peak 5, 26 weeks, 377k sales estimated, 1982), RYM 156 of 1982
5	The Human League	Don't You Want Me	1981	(United Kingdom)	UK 1 - Dec 1981 (13 weeks), US Billboard 1 - Mar 1982 (28 weeks), Norway 1 - Feb 1982 (14 weeks), Belgium 1 - Jan 1982 (9 weeks), Eire 1 for 1 week - Dec 1981, Canada RPM 1 for 1 week - May 1982, New Zealand 1 for 5 weeks - May 1982, Canada 2 - Feb 1982 (16 weeks), France 2 - Jan 1982 (3 weeks), Springbok 2 - Mar 1982 (13 weeks), UK Platinum (certified by BPI in Jan 1982), Sweden (alt) 3 - Feb 1982 (14 weeks), Switzerland 4 - Mar 1982 (6 weeks), US Gold (certified by RIAA in Jul 1982), Holland 5 - Jan 1982 (8 weeks), ODK Germany 5 - Feb 1982 (19 weeks) (4 weeks in top 10), UK sales 5 of the 1980s (1,430 k in 1981), KROQ 5 of 1982, US BB 6 of 1982, US CashBox 6 of 1982, ARC 6 of 1982 (peak 1 20 weeks), Germany 6 - Feb 1982 (3 months), Canada 8 of 1982, US Radio 9 of 1982 (peak 1 15 weeks), nuTsie 9 of 1980s, France (SNEP) 15 - May 1982 (1 month), South Africa 16 of 1982, UK Songs 2013-23 peak 19 - Mar 2014 (1 week), Holland free40 25 of 1982, POP 28 of 1982, Italy 33 of 1982, Scrobulate 34 of 80s, Brazil 45 of 1982, Virgin 46, 93 in 2FM list, Japan (Tokyo) 100 - Dec 1995 (1 week), Acclaimed 175 (1981), UKMIX 654, OzNet 741, RYM 18 of 1981, Guardian Pop 58, one of the Rock and Roll Hall of Fame 500

== Chronological table of US and UK and Japan number one hit singles ==
UK number one singles and artist (weeks at number one)	U.S. number one singles and artist (weeks at number one)
"Don't You Want Me" – The Human League (3 weeks in 1981 + 2 weeks in 1982) "Land of Make Believe" – Bucks Fizz (2) "Oh Julie" – Shakin' Stevens (1) "The Model" – Kraftwerk (1) "Town Called Malice" – The Jam (3) "The Lion Sleeps Tonight" – Tight Fit (3) "Seven Tears" – Goombay Dance Band (3) "My Camera Never Lies" – Bucks Fizz (1) "Ebony and Ivory" – Paul McCartney & Stevie Wonder (3) "A Little Peace" – Nicole (2) 500th UK No. 1 single "House of Fun" – Madness (2) "Goody Two Shoes" – Adam Ant (2) "I've Never Been to Me" – Charlene (1) "Happy Talk" – Captain Sensible (2) "Come on Eileen" – Dexys Midnight Runners (4) best selling single of the year "Eye of the Tiger" – Survivor (4) "Pass the Dutchie" – Musical Youth (3) "Do You Really Want to Hurt Me?" – Culture Club (3) "I Don't Wanna Dance" – Eddy Grant (3) "Beat Surrender" – The Jam (2) "Save Your Love" – Renée and Renato (2 weeks in 1982 + 2 weeks in 1983)	"Physical" – Olivia Newton-John (6 weeks in 1981 + 4 weeks in 1982) best selling single of the year "I Can't Go For That (No Can Do)" – Daryl Hall & John Oates (1) "Centerfold" – The J. Geils Band (6) "I Love Rock 'N Roll" – Joan Jett & The Blackhearts (7) "Titles" – Vangelis (1) "Ebony And Ivory" – Paul McCartney & Stevie Wonder (7) "Don't You Want Me" – The Human League (3) "Eye Of The Tiger" – Survivor (6) "Abracadabra" – Steve Miller Band (2) "Hard To Say I'm Sorry" – Chicago (2) "Jack And Diane" – John Cougar (4) "Who Can It Be Now?" – Men at Work (1) "Up Where We Belong" – Joe Cocker & Jennifer Warnes (3) "Truly" – Lionel Richie (2) "Mickey" – Toni Basil (1) "Maneater" – Daryl Hall & John Oates (2 weeks in 1982 + 2 weeks in 1983); Or see: Hot 100 No. 1 Hits of 1982

Japanese Oricon number one singles and artist
(weeks at number one)

- "Sailor Fuku to Kikanjū" – Hiroko Yakushimaru (2 weeks 1981 + 3 weeks 1982)
- "Jōnetsu Neppū Serenade" – Masahiko Kondō (2)
- "Akai Sweet Pea" – Seiko Matsuda (3)
- "Kokoro no Iro" – Masatoshi Nakamura (5)
- "Ikenai Rouge Magic" – Kiyoshiro Imawano & Ryuichi Sakamoto (1)
- "Furarete Banzai" – Masahiko Kondō (4)
- "Nagisa no Balcony" – Seiko Matsuda (1)
- "Harajuku Kiss" – Toshihiko Tahara (3)
- "Madonna-tachi no Lullaby" – Hiromi Iwasaki (4)
- "Hyakuman Dollar Baby" – Johnny (1)
- "Highteen Boogie" – Masahiko Kondō (5)
- "Komugi Iro no Mermaid" – Seiko Matsuda (1)
- "Kurayami wo Buttobase" (暗闇をぶっとばせ) – Daisuke Shima (1)
- "Matsu wa" – Aming (6)
- "Horeta ze! Kanpai" – Masahiko Kondō (2)
- "Yūwaku Suresure" – Toshihiko Tahara (2)
- "Nobara no Etude" – Seiko Matsuda (3)
- "Second Love" – Akina Nakamori (3)
- "3 Nenme no Uwaki" – Hiroshi & Kibo (2 weeks 1982 + 2 weeks 1983)

== Top 40 Chart hit singles ==
Song title	Artist(s)	Release date(s)	US	UK	Highest chart position	Other Chart Performance(s)
"Africa"	Rose Laurens	October 1982	n/a	n/a/	1 (Austria)	2 (Norway, Switzerland) – 3 (Germany)
"Africa"	Toto	June 1982	1	3	1 (Canada, United States)	See chart performance entry
"Annie, I'm Not Your Daddy"	Kid Creole & the Coconuts	September 1982	n/a	2	2 (United Kingdom)	See chart performance entry
"Back on the Chain Gang"	The Pretenders	September 1982	5	17	5 (United States)	4 (U.S. Mainstream Rock) – 5 (Canada) – 11 (Australia) – 14 (New Zealand)
"Blue Eyes"	Elton John	March 1982	12	8	4 (Australia)	See chart performance entry
"Body Language"	Queen	April 1982	11	25	3 (Canada)	See chart performance entry
"Break It to Me Gently"	Juice Newton	August 1982	11	n/a	11 (United States)	n/a
"Cat People (Putting Out Fire)"	David Bowie	March 1982	67	26	countries)	n/a
"Crimson and Clover"	Joan Jett & The Blackhearts	April 1982	7	60	4 (Canada)	n/a*"The Day Before You Came" – ABBA
"Dirty Laundry"	Don Henley	October 1982	3	n/a	3 (United States)	n/a
"Do Ya Wanna Funk"	Sylvester	July 1982	n/a	32	4 (Norway)	n/a
"Do You Believe in Love"	Huey Lewis and the News	January 1982	7	9	3 (Iceland)	n/a*"Don't Leave Me Now" – Supertramp
"Don't Stop Believin'"	Journey	October 1981	9	62	9 (United States)	n/a
"Down Under"	Men at Work	October 1981	1	1	countries)	n/a
"Empty Garden (Hey Hey Johnny)"	Elton John	March 1982	13	51	8 (Canada)	n/a
"Forget Me Nots"	Patrice Rushen	April 1982	23	8	8 (United Kingdom)	n/a
"Freeze-Frame"	The J. Geils Band	February 1982	4	27	2 (Canada)	n/a
"Girls on Film"	Duran Duran	July 1981	n/a	5	1 (Portugal)	n/a
"Glittering Prize"	Simple Minds	August 1982	n/a	16	9 (Australia)	n/a
"Great Southern Land"	Icehouse	August 1982	n/a	n/a	5 (Australia)	n/a
"Gypsy"	Fleetwood Mac	September 1982	12	46	12 (United States)	n/a
"Harden My Heart"	Quarterflash	September 1981	3	49	3 (United States)	n/a
"Head over Heels"	ABBA	February 1982	n/a	25	1 (France)	n/a
"Heart Attack"	Olivia Newton-John	August 1982	3	46	2 (Canada)	n/a
"Heartbreaker"	Dionne Warwick	September 1982	10	2	countries)	n/a
"Heartlight"	Neil Diamond	August 1982	5	47	5 (United States)	n/a
"Heat of the Moment"	Asia	April 1982	4	46	2 (Canada)	n/a
"Here Is the News/Ticket to the Moon"	Electric Light Orchestra	December 1981	n/a	24	24 (United Kingdom)	n/a
"Hot in the City"	Billy Idol	May 1982	23	58	4 (New Zealand)	n/a
"Hungry Like the Wolf"	Duran Duran	May 1982	3	5	1 (Canada)	n/a
"Hurts So Good"	John Cougar	April 1982	2	n/a	1 (Canada)	n/a
"I Can Make You Feel Good"	Shalamar	February 1982	n/a	7	7 (United Kingdom)	n/a
"I Love Rock 'n' Roll"	Joan Jett and the Blackhearts	January 1982	1	4	countries)	n/a
"I Ran (So Far Away)"	A Flock of Seagulls	March 1982	9	43	1 (Australia)	n/a
"I Want Candy"	Bow Wow Wow	May 1982	62	9	7 (Australia)	n/a
"If You Can't Stand the Heat"	Bucks Fizz	November 1982	n/a	10	10 (United Kingdom)	n/a
"It's Raining Again"	Supertramp	October 1982	11	26	1 (Canada)	n/a
"It's Raining Men"	The Weather Girls	September 1982	46	2	2 (United Kingdom)	n/a
"Jack and Diane"	John Cougar	July 1982	1	n/a	countries)	n/a
"Landslide"	Olivia Newton-John	April 1982	52	18	18 (United Kingdom)	n/a
"Let's Get It Up"	AC/DC	December 1981	44	13	9 (Germany)	n/a
"Living on the Ceiling"	Blancmange	October 1982	n/a	7	7 (United Kingdom)	n/a
"Love Come Down"	Evelyn "Champagne" King	July 1982	17	7	7 (United Kingdom)	n/a
"Love Is in Control (Finger on the Trigger)"	Donna Summer	July 1982	10	18	4 (Norway)	n/a
"Love My Way"	The Psychedelic Furs	July 1982	44	42	41 (New Zealand)	n/a
"Love Will Turn You Around"	Kenny Rogers	June 1982	13	n/a	13 (United States)	n/a
"Love's Been a Little Bit Hard on Me"	Juice Newton	May 1982	7	n/a	2 (Canada)	n/a
"Maid of Orleans"	Orchestral Manoeuvres in the Dark	January 1982	n/a	4	countries)	n/a
"Make a Move on Me"	Olivia Newton-John	January 1982	5	43	4 (Canada)	n/a
"Man on the Corner"	Genesis	March 1982	40	42	40 (United States)	n/a
"Memory"	Barbra Streisand	January 1982	52	n/a	52 (United States)	n/a
"Mexican Radio"	Wall of Voodoo	September 1982	58	n/a	18 (Canada)	n/a
"Mickey"	Toni Basil	January 1982	1	2	countries)	n/a
"Mirror Man"	The Human League	November 1982	30	2	2 (United Kingdom)	n/a
"Mirror Mirror"	Diana Ross	January 1982	8	n/a	8 (United States)	n/a
"Muscles"	Diana Ross	September 1982	10	15	1 (Sweden)	n/a
"Never Give Up on a Good Thing"	George Benson	January 1982	n/a	14	14 (United Kingdom)	n/a
"New World Man"	Rush	August 1982	21	42	1 (Canada)	n/a
"Nobody"	Sylvia	June 1982	15	n/a	5 (Canada)	n/a
"Pretty Woman"	Van Halen	January 1982	12	61	1 (Canada)	n/a
"Only the Lonely"	The Motels	March 1982	9	n/a	9 (United States)	n/a
"Only Time Will Tell"	Asia	July 1982	17	54	17 (United States)	n/a
"Planet Rock"	Afrika Bambaataa	April 1982	48	n/a	48 (United States)	n/a
"Pressure"	Billy Joel	September 1982	20	n/a	9 (Canada)	n/a
"Promised You a Miracle"	Simple Minds	April 1982	n/a	13	10 (Australia)	n/a
"Rio"	Duran Duran	November 1982	14	9	9 (United Kingdom)	n/a
"Rock the Casbah"	The Clash	June 1982	8	30	8 (United States)	n/a
"Run to the Hills"	Iron Maiden	February 1982	n/a	7	7 (United Kingdom)	n/a
"Save a Prayer"	Duran Duran	August 1982	16	2	2 (United Kingdom)	n/a
"Say Hello, Wave Goodbye"	Soft Cell	January 1982	n/a	3	3 (United Kingdom)	n/a
"Senses Working Overtime"	XTC	January 1982	n/a	10	10 (United Kingdom)	n/a
"Should I Stay or Should I Go"	The Clash	May 1982	45	17	17 (United Kingdom)	n/a
"Shy Boy"	Bananarama	July 1982	83	4	4 (United Kingdom)	n/a
"Since You're Gone"	The Cars	January 1982	41	37	37 (United Kingdom)	n/a
"Situation"	Yazoo	July 1982	73	n/a	61 (Canada)	n/a
"Six Months in a Leaky Boat"	Split Enz	May 1982	n/a			
"State of Independence"	Donna Summer	August 1982	41	14	1 (Netherlands)	n/a
"Steppin' Out"	Joe Jackson	August 1982	6	6	5 (Canada)	n/a
"That Girl"	Stevie Wonder	January 1982	4	39	4 (United States)	n/a
"The Message"	Grandmaster Flash and the Furious Five	July 1982	62	8	8 (United Kingdom)	n/a
"The Number of the Beast"	Iron Maiden	April 1982	n/a	18	18 (United Kingdom)	n/a
"The One Thing"	INXS	July 1982	30	n/a	14 (Australia)	n/a
"The Safety Dance"	Men Without Hats	November 1982	3	6	3 (United States)	n/a
"Theme from Harry's Game"	Clannad	October 1982	n/a	5	5 (United Kingdom)	n/a
"Theme from Hill Street Blues"	Mike Post and Larry Carlton	August 1981	10	25	10 (United States)	n/a
"There It Is"	Shalamar	May 1982	n/a	5	5 (United Kingdom)	n/a
"Time (Clock of the Heart)"	Culture Club	November 1982	2	3	3 (United Kingdom)	n/a
"Thru These Walls"	Phil Collins	October 1982	56	56	56 (United Kingdom)	n/a
"Twilight Zone (Golden Earring song)"	Golden Earring	August 1982	10	n/a	1 (Netherlands)	n/a
"Under Pressure"	Queen and David Bowie	October 1981	29	1	countries)	n/a
"Vacation"	The Go-Go's	June 1982	8	n/a	8 (United States)	n/a
"View from a Bridge"	Kim Wilde	April 1982	n/a	16	2 (s)	n/a
"Waiting for a Girl Like You"	Foreigner	October 1981	2	8	2 (United States)	n/a
"What About Me"	Moving Pictures	January 1982	29	n/a	1 (Australia)	n/a
"White Wedding"	Billy Idol	October 1982	36	6	5 (New Zealand)	n/a
"Why"	Carly Simon	July 1982	74	10	10 (United Kingdom)	n/a
"Wishing (If I Had a Photograph of You)"	A Flock of Seagulls	November 1982	26	10	10 (United Kingdom)	n/a
"Yesterday's Songs"	Neil Diamond	November 1981	11	n/a	11 (United States)	n/a
"You and I"	Eddie Rabbitt and Crystal Gayle	October 1982	7	n/a	7 (United States)	n/a
"You Can Do Magic"	America	July 1982	8	59	8 (United States)	n/a
"You Can't Hurry Love"	Phil Collins	November 1982	10	1	countries)	n/a
"You Should Hear How She Talks About You"	Melissa Manchester	May 1982	5	n/a	4 (Australia)	n/a
"Young Guns (Go for It)"	Wham!	October 1982	n/a	3	3 (United Kingdom)	n/a
"Young Turks"	Rod Stewart	October 1981	5	11	2 (Canada)	n/a

== Number One hit singles ==
Song title	Artist(s)	Release date(s)	Date reached number one	Weeks at number one	Country(s)
"Abracadabra"	Steve Miller Band	September 1982	September 1982	2 weeks	10 countries
"Billie Jean"	Michael Jackson	January 1983	April 1983	7 weeks	12 countries
"Centerfold"	The J. Geils Band	February 1982	March 1982	6 weeks	United States, Australia, Canada
"Come On Eileen"	Dexys Midnight Runners	July 1982	April 1983	4 weeks	8 countries
"Da Da Da"	Trio	April 1982	September 1982	5 weeks	4 countries
"Do You Really Want to Hurt Me"	Culture Club	October 1982	December 1982	3 weeks	12 countries
"Don't You Want Me"	The Human League	December 1981	July 1982	3 weeks	8 countries
"Ebony and Ivory"	Paul McCartney & Stevie Wonder	April 1982	July 1982	7 weeks	13 countries
"Eye in the Sky"	The Alan Parsons Project	August 1982	October 1982	3 weeks	Canada, Spain
"Eye of the Tiger"	Survivor	July 1982	September 1982	6 weeks	14 countries
"Gloria"	Laura Branigan	June 1982	February 1983	7 weeks	Australia, Canada
"Goody Two Shoes"	Adam Ant	June 1982	July 1982	2 weeks	United Kingdom, Australia
"Hard to Say I'm Sorry"	Chicago	September 1982	September 1982	2 weeks	5 countries
"House of Fun"	Madness	May 1982	June 1982	2 weeks	United Kingdom
"I Love Rock 'n' Roll"	Joan Jett & the Blackhearts	March 1982	May 1982	7 weeks	6 countries
"I Ran (So Far Away)"	A Flock of Seagulls	March 1982	August 1982	2 weeks	Australia
"I've Never Been to Me"	Charlene	June 1982	July 1982	4 weeks	United Kingdom, Australia
"Jack & Diane"	John Mellencamp	October 1982	October 1982	4 weeks	United States
"Maid of Orleans (The Waltz Joan of Arc)"	Orchestral Manoeuvres in the Dark	January 1982	April 1982	4 weeks	4 countries
"Maneater"	Hall & Oates	December 1982	January 1983	4 weeks	United States, Canada, Spain
"Oh Julie"	Shakin' Stevens	January 1982	February 1982	1 week	8 countries
"Pass the Dutchie"	Musical Youth	September 1982	November 1982	3 weeks	9 countries
"Physical"	Olivia Newton-John	November 1981	February 1982	10 weeks	8 countries
"Tainted Love"	Soft Cell	September 1981	July 1982	2 weeks	6 countries
"The Lion Sleeps Tonight"	Tight Fit	March 1982	April 1982	3 weeks	4 countries
"The Other Woman"	Ray Parker Jr.	March 1982	June 1982	1 week	Australia
"Trouble"	Lindsey Buckingham	February 1982	March 1982	3 weeks	Australia
"Up Where We Belong"	Joe Cocker & Jennifer Warnes	July 1982	November 1982	3 weeks	4 countries
"What About Me"	Moving Pictures	March 1982	May 1982	6 weeks	Australia
"Who Can It Be Now?"	Men at Work	July 1981	October 1982; August 1981 in Australia	2 weeks	United States, Australia, Israel
"Words"	F. R. David	August 1982	December 1982	6 weeks	14 countries

=== Other Chart hit singles ===
- "3×3" (EP) – Genesis
- "All Quiet on the Western Front" – Elton John
- "Almost with You" – The Church (# 21 Australia)
- "Another Sleepless Night" – Anne Murray (# 44 US)
- "Being Boiled" – Human League
- "Best Years of Our Lives" – Modern Romance
- "Body + Soul" – Jo Kennedy (#5 Australia)
- "Caught Up in You" – 38 Special (#9 Canada, #10 US)
- "Cherry Pink (and Apple Blossom White)" – Modern Romance
- "Confidences sur la Fréquence" – Dalida
- "Countdown" – Rush
- "Dancing in the Street" – Van Halen
- "Danza" – Dalida
- "Džuli" (English language version "Julie") – Daniel Popović
- "Enough Is Enough" – April Wine
- "Everybody" – Madonna
- "Fantastic Day" – Haircut One Hundred (#9 UK)
- "Fool (If You Think It's Over)" – Elkie Brooks
- "Forever Now" – Cold Chisel
- "Ghosts" – Japan
- "Goin' Down" – Greg Guidry
- "Hand to Hold On To" – John Cougar
- "Heart of the Night" – Juice Newton
- "Hope You Love Me Like You Say You Do" – Huey Lewis and the News
- "I Love It Loud" – Kiss
- "I Melt with You" – Modern English
- "I Will Always Love You" – Dolly Parton
- "Iron Fist" – Motörhead
- "Irmão De Côr" – Catui
- "It's Gonna Take a Miracle" – Deniece Williams
- "Jambo Bwana" – Them Mushrooms
- "Jouez Bouzouki" – Dalida
- "Never Say Never" – Romeo Void
- "New World Man" – Rush
- "Nova Heart" – Spoons
- "Personally" – Karla Bonoff
- "Right Before Your Eyes" – America
- "Roll Me Away" – Bob Seger
- "She's Got a Way" – Billy Joel
- "Sole Survivor" – Asia
- "Solid Rock" – Goanna
- "Somebody's Always Saying Goodbye" – Anne Murray
- "Southern Cross" – Crosby, Stills, and Nash
- "Spread a Little Happiness" – Sting
- "Sweet Dreams" (1981) – Air Supply
- "Tony" – Dalida
- "US Forces" – Midnight Oil
- "Valley Girl" – Frank Zappa
- "When the Tigers Broke Free" – Pink Floyd
- "Without You (Not Another Lonely Night)" – Franke and the Knockouts
- "Yellow Pearl" – Phil Lynott
- "You Dropped a Bomb on Me" – The Gap Band
- "You Got Lucky" – Tom Petty
- "You Need a Friend" – Sunnyboys

== Notable singles ==
Song title	Artist(s)	Release date(s)	Other Chart Performance(s)
"A Celebration"	U2	March 1982	15 (Irish Singles Chart) – 47 (UK Singles Chart)
"Don't Change"	INXS	October 1982	14 (Australia) – 17 (U.S. Billboard Mainstream Rock) – 80 (U.S. Billboard Hot 100)
"Everywhere That I'm Not" b/w "Current Events"	Translator	October 1982	n/a
"Glittering Prize"	Simple Minds	August 1982	See chart performance entry
"Hungry Like the Wolf"	Duran Duran	May 1982	See chart performance entry
"Maid of Orleans (The Waltz Joan of Arc)"	Orchestral Manoeuvres in the Dark	January 1982	See chart performance entry
"The Message"	Grandmaster Flash and the Furious Five	July 1982	See chart performance entry
"Mexican Radio"	Wall of Voodoo	September 1982	18 (Canada) – 21 (New Zealand) – 33 (Australia) – 64 (UK Singles Chart) – 58 (U.S. Billboard Hot 100)
"Never Say Never"	Romeo Void	November 1982	27 (US Billboard Mainstream Rock)
"Nova Heart"	Spoons	May 1982	40 (Canada)
"The One Thing"	INXS	July 1982	See chart performance entry
"Promised You a Miracle"	Simple Minds	April 1982	See chart performance entry
"Senses Working Overtime"	XTC	January 1982	See chart performance entry
"Six Months in a Leaky Boat"	Split Enz	May 1982	See chart performance entry
"Solid Rock"	Goanna	September 1982	2 (Australia) – 61 (U.S. Billboard Hot 100)
"Tatibitati"	Rita Lee	November 1981	51 (France)
"US Forces"	Midnight Oil	November 1982	20 (Australia)
"Valley Girl"	Frank and Moon Unit Zappa	June 1982	12 (U.S. Billboard Top Tracks) – 18 (Canada) – 32 (U.S. Billboard Hot 100)

== Published popular music ==
- How Do You Keep the Music Playing? w. Alan Bergman & Marilyn Bergman m. Michel LeGrand. From the film Best Friends.
- "Key Largo" w.m. Sonny Limbo & Bertie Higgins
- "Let's Go to the Movies" w. Martin Charnin m. Charles Strouse from the film version of the musical Annie
- "Sandy (Dumb Dog)" w. Martin Charnin m. Charles Strouse from the film version of the musical Annie
- "Sign!" w. Martin Charnin w. Martin Charnin m. Charles Strouse from the film version of the musical Annie
- "St. Elsewhere theme song" m. Dave Grusin
- "Up Where We Belong" w. Will Jennings m. Buffy Sainte-Marie & Jack Nitzsche
- "We Got Annie" w. Martin Charnin m. Charles Strouse from the film version of the musical Annie
- "Where Everybody Knows Your Name" w.m. Judy Hart Angelo & Gary Portnoy, theme from the TV series Cheers
- "Without Us" w. Tom Scott m. Jeff Barry, theme from the TV series Family Ties

== Classical music ==
- Hans Abrahamsen – Nacht und Trompeten
- George Crumb
  - Pastoral Drone for organ
  - Trio for Strings
- Mario Davidovsky – String Trio for violin, viola, violoncello
- Ross Edwards – Piano Concerto in A
- Morton Feldman
  - Three Voices
  - For John Cage, for violin and piano
- Lorenzo Ferrero
  - Thema 44 (ad honorem J. Haydn)
  - My Blues
  - Respiri
  - Soleils
- Daron Hagen – Echo's Songs
- Rudolf Komorous – Serenade for Strings
- György Ligeti – Trio for Violin, Horn and Piano
- Mel Powell – String Quartet
- Poul Ruders
  - Manhattan Abstraction for orchestra
  - Greeting Concertino
  - Piano Sonata No. 2
- Robert Simpson – String Quartet no. 9, 32 Variations and Fugue on a Theme of Haydn
- Tōru Takemitsu
  - Rain Coming for chamber orchestra
  - Rain Spell for flute, clarinet, harp, piano and vibraphone
- Jay Ungar – Ashokan Farewell

== Ballet ==
See List of 1982 ballet premieres

== Opera ==
- Thea Musgrave – An Occurrence at Owl Creek Bridge
- Stephen Paulus – The Postman Always Rings Twice
- Peter Sculthorpe – Quiros

== Musical theater ==
- Andy Capp (Alan Price) – London production opened at the Aldwych Theatre on September 28 and ran for 99 performances
- Cats (Andrew Lloyd Webber) – Broadway production opened at the Winter Garden Theatre on October 7 and ran for 7485 performances, the longest run in the history of Broadway to date
- Joseph and the Amazing Technicolor Dreamcoat (Andrew Lloyd Webber and Tim Rice) – Broadway production opened at the Royale Theatre on January 27 and ran for 747 performances
- Little Shop of Horrors – off-Broadway production opened at the Orpheum Theatre on July 27 and ran for 2209 performances
- Nine – Broadway production opened at the 46th Street Theatre on May 9 and ran for 729 performances
- Pirates Of Penzance – London revival
- Seven Brides For Seven Brothers (Saul Chaplin, Gene de Paul and Johnny Mercer) – Broadway production opened at the Alvin Theatre on July 8 and ran for 5 performances
- Song and Dance (Andrew Lloyd Webber) – London production opened at the Palace Theatre on April 7 and ran for 781 performances

== Musical films ==
- Alice
- Annie
- The Best Little Whorehouse in Texas
- Disco Dancer
- Grease 2 (released June 11), starring Maxwell Caulfield and Michelle Pfeiffer (in her feature film debut)
- One from the Heart
- Parsifal
- Patnam Vachina Pativrathalu
- Pink Floyd – The Wall
- Starstruck
- Une chambre en ville
- Victor/Victoria
- Yes, Giorgio

== Musical television ==
- Live at Austin City Limits
- Sweeney Todd
- Liquid Sky

== Births ==
- January 3 – Chisu, Finnish singer-songwriter
- January 4 – Kang Hye-jung, South Korean actress and singer
- January 9 – Isaac Delahaye, Belgian guitarist and composer
- January 10 – Ana Layevska, Ukrainian–born, Mexican singer and actress
- January 12 – Nicole Morier, American singer-songwriter and producer
- January 15 – Kang Se-jung, South Korean actress and singer (Papaya)
- January 17
  - Alex Varkatzas, Greek-American metalcore lead vocalist (Atreyu)
  - Hwanhee, South Korean singer and actor (Fly To The Sky)
- January 18
  - Quinn Allman, guitarist (The Used)
  - Joanna Newsom, American multi-instrumentalist, singer-songwriter and actress
- January 19 – Angela Chang, Taiwanese singer and actress
- January 23
  - Statik Selektah, American DJ and record producer
  - Oceana, German singer and songwriter
- January 24 – Daveed Diggs, American rapper, actor and singer (clipping.)
- January 25
  - Noemi, Italian singer
  - Sho Sakurai, Japanese singer
- January 28 – Ryan Sheridan, Irish singer-songwriter and guitarist
- January 29 – Adam Lambert, American singer, songwriter, stage actor, American Idol 8 finalist (Queen + Adam Lambert)
- January 31
  - Elena Paparizou, Greek-Swedish singer
  - Yukimi Nagano, Swedish singer and songwriter (Little Dragon)
- February 1 – Kim Jong-wook, South Korean singer
- February 2 – Kan Mi-youn, South Korean singer (Baby Vox)
- February 3 – Jessica Harp, American singer and guitarist (The Wreckers)
- February 4 – Kimberly Wyatt, American singer, dancer (The Pussycat Dolls)
- February 5 – Wheesung, South Korean R&B singer
- February 7 – Delia Matache, Romanian singer
- February 9 – Ami Suzuki, Japanese singer
- February 10 – Darren McMullen, British-Australian The Voice TV host, actor, music critic and music journalist
- February 16
  - Conway the Machine, American rapper
  - Lupe Fiasco, American rapper
- February 17 – Daniel Merriweather, British R&B musician
- February 18 – Nervo (DJs), Australian twin sister DJs
- February 18 – Juelz Santana, American rapper from Harlem, New York, and member of The Diplomats
- February 20 — Chang Kiha, South Korean singer-songwriter
- February 22 – Danja, American record producer and songwriter (Britney Spears, Nelly Furtado, Justin Timberlake, Joe Jonas)
- February 25
  - Bert McCracken, lead singer of American rock band The Used
  - Kimberly Caldwell, American singer and presenter
- February 26 – Nate Ruess, American singer-songwriter
- March 1 – Kim Min-hee, South Korean actress
- March 2 – Jessica Biel, American actress, model, voice actress, producer and singer
- March 4 – Amanda Shires, American singer-songwriter and violin player.
- Ha Seok-jin, South Korean actor
- March 8 – Marjorie Estiano, Brazilian actress and singer-songwriter
- March 13 – Darbuka Siva, Indian percussionist and composer
- March 14 – Kate Maberly, English actress, director, writer, producer and musician
- March 17 – Herman Sikumbang, Indonesian guitarist (d. 2018)
- March 19 – Hana Kobayashi, Venezuelan singer of Japanese descent.
- March 20 – Emma O'Driscoll, Irish singer and television presenter
- March 21
  - Jocie Kok, Chinese-Singaporean singer
  - Santino Fontana, American actor and singer
- March 22
  - Pete Bennett, English rock singer (Daddy Fantastic) and television personality (Big Brother 2006)
  - Chris Wallace, American musician and singer
- March 24 - Nivea (singer), American R&B singer
- April 3 – Cobie Smulders, Canadian singer and actress
- April 7 – Kelli Young, English pop singer (Liberty X)
- April 8 – Keegan DeWitt, American singer-songwriter and actor (Wild Cub)
- April 10 – Nadia Meikher, Ukrainian singer-songwriter
- April 12
  - Easton Corbin, American country music singer
  - Deen, Bosnian singer
- April 13
  - Janice Vidal, Hong Kong singer and actress
  - Jill Vidal, Hong Kong singer and actress
  - Ty Dolla Sign, American singer, songwriter and rapper
  - Nellie McKay, English–American singer, songwriter and activist
- April 17 – Lee Joon-gi, South Korean actor, singer, dancer and model
- April 18 – Marie-Élaine Thibert, Canadian singer
- April 21 – Lynn Hilary, Irish singer-songwriter and guitarist (Celtic Woman and Anúna)
- April 24 – Kelly Clarkson, American singer, songwriter, actress and author, first American Idol winner
- April 26
  - Nadja Benaissa, German pop singer
  - Jon Lee, English singer (S Club 7)
- April 28 – Nikko Smith, American singer
- April 30
  - Lloyd Banks, African American/Puerto Rican rapper
  - Drew Seeley, Canadian actor, singer-songwriter and dancer
  - Kirsten Dunst, American actress, model and singer
  - Cleo Higgins, English singer, songwriter and dancer (Cleopatra)
- May 1 – Anya Lahiri, English actress, model, singer and fitness instructor (Precious)
- May 4 – Vera Schmidt, Hungarian singer-songwriter
- May 10 – Boom, South Korean rapper
- May 11 – Cory Monteith, Canadian actor and musician (d. 2013)
- May 14 – Dan Nigro, American songwriter and producer (As Tall As Lions)
- May 15
  - Layal Abboud, Lebanese singer
  - Jessica Sutta, American singer, dancer, songwriter, actress and choreographer (The Pussycat Dolls)
- May 16
  - Billy Crawford, Filipino-American singer
  - Dimitri Vegas, Belgian DJ, producer and half of Dimitri Vegas & Like Mike
- May 23
  - Tristan Prettyman, American singer-songwriter, musician and Foxy Model
  - Malene Mortensen, Danish singer
- May 27 – Louis Bell, American musician, record producer and mixer
- May 31 – Casey James, American singer
- June 2 – Jewel Staite, Canadian actress and singer
- June 3 – Dihan Slabbert, South African singer-songwriter and producer
- June 4 – Jin Au-Yeung, Chinese-American rapper
- June 5 – Scott Speer, American filmmaker, music video director, television director and novelist.
- June 7 – Amy Nuttall, British actress and opera singer
- June 13 – Jessica Caban, American fashion model, actress, musician and muse of Bruno Mars
- June 14
  - Freddie Gibbs, American rapper (Freddie Gibbs & Madlib)
  - Lang Lang, Chinese concert pianist
- June 15 – Haley Scarnato, American singer and American Idol finalist
- June 17 – Arthur Darvill, English actor and musician (Doctor Who)
- June 19 - Jessica Betts, American singer and actress
- June 21 – Jussie Smollett, American singer, actor, activist, director and photographer
- June 21 - Rob Mills, Australian actor, singer, songwriter and television host
- June 23
  - Candice Alley, Australian singer-songwriter ("Falling", Colorblind)
  - Martin Rolinski, Swedish singer
  - Jo Eun-byul, South Korean singer and actress (Luv)
- June 25
  - Lola Ponce, Argentinian-Italian singer-songwriter and actress
  - Rain, South Korean singer, songwriter, dancer, actor and record producer
- July 2 – Ilya Gringolts, Russian violinist and educator
- July 5 – Dave Haywood, American singer-songwriter and guitarist (Lady Antebellum)
- July 6 – Tay Zonday, American musician and voice actor
- July 7
  - Cassidy, American hip-hop recording artist and rapper
  - Julien Doré, French singer-songwriter, musician and actor
- July 10 – Alex Arrowsmith, American rock musician
- July 12
  - Mahalia Barnes, Australian singer-songwriter and manager, (Jimmy Barnes, Reece Mastin)
  - Walter Perez, American actor and musician
- July 15 – Carl Espen, Norwegian singer and songwriter
- July 17 – Natasha Hamilton, English pop singer-songwriter(Atomic Kitten)
- July 18
  - Ryan Cabrera, American singer-songwriter and musician (Ashlee Simpson, Lisa Origliasso, Riley Keough, Audrina Patridge)
  - Priyanka Chopra, Indian actress, singer, film producer and philanthropist
- July 19 – Christopher Bear, American drummer (Grizzly Bear)
- July 23
  - Claudette Ortiz, American soul singer
  - Ricky Reed, American artist, music producer, singer, songwriter and founder
- July 26 – Alex Scally, American multi-instrumentalist and songwriter (Beach House)
- July 27 – Westside Gunn, American rapper
- July 27 – Rebecca Zadig, Swedish singer
- July 30 – Rebecca Stephens, English singer (The Pipettes)
- August 1 – Orelsan, French rapper
- August 4 – Quindon Tarver, American singer (d. 2021)
- August 6 – Spice, Jamaican dancehall singer and songwriter
- August 7 – Abbie Cornish, Australian actress and rapper under the pseudonym "Dusk"
- August 8 – Raef, Egyptian-American singer and songwriter
- August 10 – Vincent Rodriguez III, American actor, singer and dancer
- August 13
  - Gil Ofarim, German singer, songwriter and actor
  - Tamara Jaber, Australian singer (Scandal'us)
  - Kalenna Harper, American singer-songwriter
- August 16 – Ummet Ozcan, Dutch-Turkish DJ and producer
- August 19
  - Willy Denzey, French singer
  - Erika Christensen, American actress and singer
- August 22 – Boys Noize, German EDM DJ and producer
- August 27 – Duke Dumont, British record producer, songwriter, musician and DJ
- August 28 – LeAnn Rimes, American singer, songwriter, actress and author
- August 29 – Mayana Moura, Brilizian singer, actress and model
- September 3
  - Andrew McMahon, American musician
  - Kaori Natori, Japanese singer and model
- September 4 - Drapht. Australian hip-hop artist from Perth, Western Australia
- September 5 – Cyndi Wang, Taiwanese singer and actress
- September 7 – Race Wong, Hong Kong singer/actress (2R)
- September 9 – Ai Otsuka, Japanese singer
- September 10 – Kyla-Rose Smith, South African violinist, singer and dancer (Freshlyground)
- September 14 – Wes Carr, Australian singer-songwriter and multi-instrumentalist (Australian Idol 8)
- September 17 – Wade Robson, American choreographer, producer, songwriter and dancer (Britney Spears, Justin Timberlake)
- September 19 – Skepta, British grime MC, rapper, songwriter and record producer.
- September 20 – Ian Kirkpatrick (record producer), American songwriter and record producer (worked with Dua Lipa, Selena Gomez, Britney Spears)
- September 22 – Billie Piper, British singer and actress
- September 27
  - Anna Camp, American actress-singer (Pitch Perfect)
  - Jon McLaughlin, American pop rock singer-songwriter, producer and pianist
  - Lil Wayne, American rapper
- September 28 – St. Vincent (musician), American singer-songwriter, multi instrumentalist and guitar designer
- September 29 – Stephen "tWitch" Boss, American hip hip dancer, DJ, actor and entertainer
- September 30 – Kieran Culkin, American actor
- October 1 – Sandra Oxenryd, Swedish pop singer
- October 6 – MC Lars, American rapper
- October 7 – Lockett Pundt, American singer-songwriter and guitarist (Deerhunter)
- October 15 – Paulini, Fijian-born Australian singer, songwriter and actress
- October 16 – Kim Ah-joong, South Korean actress, model, and singer
- October 19 – Hiromi Hayakawa, Japanese-born Mexican actress and singer (d. 2017)
- October 25 – Eman Lam, Hong Kong singer
- October 27
  - Keri Hilson, American singer
  - Jessy Matador, Congolese-French singer
  - Joana Zimmer, German singer
- October 28
  - Mai Kuraki, Japanese singer
  - Park Hyun-bin, South Korean singer
- October 30 - Chimène Badi, French singer
- November 3 - Raquel del Rosario, Spanish singer and was the lead vocalist of the band El Sueño de Morfeo (Morpheus' Dream).
- November 6 – Sowelu, Japanese singer
- November 11 – Heo Jung-min, South Korean actor and singer (M.C the Max)
- November 12 – Anne Hathaway, American actress, musical star and singer
- November 13
  - Michael Copon, American actor model and singer
  - Kumi Koda, Japanese singer
- November 14 – Joy Williams (singer), American singer-songwriter
- November 15 – Jenifer (singer), French singer and actress
- November 18
  - Aoife O'Donovan, Irish-American singer and songwriter
  - Neha Bhasin, Indian singer (Viva)
- November 21 – Ryan Starr, American singer
- November 22
  - Charlene Choi, Hong Kong singer and actress (Twins)
  - Steve Angello, Greek Swedish DJ, music producer and
- November 23 – Leah Jenner, American musician
- November 30 - Ms. Rachel, American educator, YouTuber, activist, and singer-songwriter.
- December 1 – Riz Ahmed, British actor, rapper, and activist
- December 3 – Jaycee Chan, Hong Kong actor and singer
- December 5 – Keri Hilson, American singer, songwriter and actress
- December 6 – Ulysses Owens, American jazz drummer and percussionist
- December 7 – Chrispa, Greek singer and actress
- December 8
  - Chrisette Michele, American R&B singer-songwriter
  - Nicki Minaj, American rapper and singer
  - Serena Ryder, Canadian musician
- December 13 – Anthony Callea, Australian singer-songwriter, stage actor and activist
- December 14 – Anthony Way, British singer and actor
- December 16
  - Frankie Ballard, American country music singer-songwriter
  - Mei Finegold, Israeli singer
  - Anna Sedokova, Ukrainian singer, actress and television presenter
  - Cherise Roberts, English singer and songwriter (Big Brovaz)
- December 20
  - David Cook, American singer
  - Jason Zhang, Chinese pop singer
- December 23
  - Beatriz Luengo, Spanish singer, songwriter, actress, dancer and entrepreneur
  - Toru Kitajima, Japanese singer (Ling Tosite Sigure)
- December 24
  - Masaki Aiba, Japanese singer
  - Robert Carmine, vocalist (Rooney)
- December 27 – Terji Skibenæs, Faroese guitarist (Týr)

== Deaths ==
- January – Sudhin Dasgupta, music director, lyricist, and singer, 52
- January 16 – Harald Agersnap, Danish classical musician, 92
- January 19 – Elis Regina, Brazilian singer, 36 (drug/alcohol overdose)
- January 22 – Tommy Tucker, singer=songwriter, 48 (carbon tetrachloride poisoning)
- January 28 – Bert Etta Davis, American alto saxophonist, 58
- January 30
  - Stanley Holloway, English actor and singer, 91
  - Lightnin' Hopkins, blues singer, 69
- February 4 – Alex Harvey, rock singer and guitarist, 46
- February 16 – Luis Pacheco de Céspedes, Peruvian composer, violinist, and conductor, 86
- February 17 – Thelonious Monk, jazz pianist, 64
- February 18 – Nathaniel Shilkret, composer and musician, 92
- February 20 – Sholom Katz, American Jewish cantor
- February 21 – Murray the K, disc jockey, 60
- February 25 – Chao Yuen Ren, composer, 89
- March 5 – John Belushi, entertainer of The Blues Brothers fame, 33 (drug overdose)
- March 7 – Chuck Thompson, American jazz drummer, 55
- March 19 – Randy Rhoads, guitarist, 25 (plane crash)
- March 24 – Aileen Stanley, singer, 84 or 85
- March 26 – Ferdinando Garimberti, violin maker, 88
- March 27 – Bob Ysaguirre, Belizean-born American jazz double bass and tuba player, 85
- March 29 – Carl Orff, German composer, famous for the choral work Carmina Burana, 86
- March 31 – Georgios Poniridis, Greek composer and violinist, 90
- April 2
  - Yedidya Admon, Israeli composer and singer, 87
  - Sam Coslow, songwriter and singer, 79
- April 7 – Koço Uçi, Albanian composer and conductor, 59
- April 8 – Branko Grković, Bosnian-Herzegovinian composer, arranger, music editor, music critic, pianist, music educator, and writer on music, 62
- April 30 – Lester Bangs, American music journalist, 33 (overdose)
- May 1 – William Primrose, violist, 77
- May 5 – Cal Tjader, Latin jazz musician, 56 (heart attack)
- May 6 – Pinocchio James, 54, American jazz and R&B singer, 54
- May 8 – Neil Bogart, owner of Casablanca Records, 39 (cancer)
- May 12 – Humphrey Searle, composer, 66
- May 13
  - Sal Pace, American jazz clarinetist and saxophonist, 75
  - Renzo Rossellini, film composer, 74
- May 14 – Jean Derbès, French composer, pianist, and music critic, 45
- May 15 – Joëlle Mogensen, French singer, 29 (drug overdose)
- May 16 – Adriano Correia de Oliveira, Portuguese composer and singer, 40
- May 18 – Lajos Kiss, Hungarian ethnomusicologist, music educator, academic administrator, conductor, editor, and folk-song collector, 82
- May 26 – Nanny Larsén-Todsen, operatic soprano, 97
- May 30 – Leon René, songwriter, 80
- June 15 – Art Pepper, jazz saxophonist, 56 (brain hemorrhage)
- June 16 – James Honeyman-Scott, guitarist, 25 (heart failure from cocaine use)
- July 8 – Aino Seep, Estonian singer and actress, 57
- July 9 – Wingy Manone, jazz trumpeter, 82
- July 10 – Maria Jeritza, operatic soprano, 96
- July 15 – Bill Justis, American saxophonist, songwriter, and producer, 55 (cancer)
- July 15 – Lionel Daunais, Canadian baritone and composer, 80
- July 22 – Sonny Stitt, jazz saxophonist, 58
- July 28 – Keith Green, gospel singer, 28 (plane crash)
- July 28 – Nick Lucas Jazz Guitarist, Musician, 84
- August 13 – Joe Tex, Southern soul singer, 49
- August 25 – Anna German, Polish singer, 46
- September 1 – Clifford Curzon, pianist, 75
- September 12
  - Franz Grothe, German composer, arranger, songwriter, conductor, and pianist, 73
  - Federico Moreno Torroba, composer, 91
- September 14 – Christian Ferras, French violinist, 49 (suicide)
- September 17 – Manos Loïzos, Greek composer, 44
- September 23 – Jimmy Wakely, American Country-Western singer and actor, 68
- September 29 – A. L. Lloyd, folk song collector, 74
- October 4 – Glenn Gould, pianist, 50 (stroke)
- October 16
  - Jakov Gotovac, composer and conductor, 87
  - Mario del Monaco, operatic tenor, 67
- October 21 – Radka Toneff, Norwegian jazz singer, 30
- October 29 – William Lloyd Webber, British organist and composer, 68
- November 16 – Al Haig, jazz pianist, 58
- December 2 – David Blue, folk singer, 41
- December 8 – Marty Robbins, country singer, 57
- December 19 – Andy Anderson, African-American jazz trumpeter, composer, and bandleader, 77
- December 10 – Roy Webb, film composer, 94

== Awards ==
=== Grammy Awards ===
- Grammy Awards of 1982

=== Country Music Association Awards ===
- 1982 Country Music Association Awards

=== Eurovision Song Contest ===
- Eurovision Song Contest 1982

== Charts ==
=== List of No. 1 Hits ===
- Hot 100 No. 1 Hits of 1982

== See also ==
- 1982 in music (UK)
- Record labels established in 1982
- List of years in music
