= Modern English discography =

- Studio albums: 8
- EPs: 3
- Live albums: 3
- Compilation albums: 3
- Singles: 18

This is the discography of English new wave/post-punk band Modern English.

== Albums ==
=== Studio albums ===
Title	Album details	Peak chart positions			Certifications
Title	Album details	UK Indie	CAN	US	Certifications
Mesh & Lace	Released: 10 April 1981; Label: 4AD; Formats: LP, MC	5	—	—	
After the Snow	Released: 23 April 1982; Label: 4AD, Sire; Formats: LP, MC	13	84	70	US: Gold
Ricochet Days	Released: 10 February 1984; Label: 4AD, Sire; Formats: LP, MC	5	—	93	
Stop Start	Released: 18 February 1986; Label: Sire; Formats: LP, MC	—	—	154	
Pillow Lips	Released: May 1990; Label: TVT; Formats: CD, LP, MC	—	—	135	
Everything's Mad	Released: March 1996; Label: Imago; Formats: CD, MC	—	—	—	
Soundtrack	Released: 24 May 2010; Label: Darla; Formats: CD, digital download	—	—	—	
Take Me to the Trees	Released: 5 September 2016; Label: Self-released; Formats: CD, LP, digital download	—	—	—	
1234	Released: 23 February 2024; Label: Mesh & Lace; Formats: CD, LP, digital download	—	—	—	
"—" denotes releases that did not chart or were not released in that territory.

=== Live albums ===
Title	Album details
In Concert	Released: 15 January 2008; Label: Cleopatra; Formats: digital download
Modern English	Released: 2009; Label: Madacy Entertainment; Formats: CD
After the Snow – Live from Indigo at the O2	Released: 27 August 2021; Label: Mesh & Lace Recordings; Formats: CD+DVD, LP, digital download

=== Compilation albums ===
Title	Album details
Life in the Gladhouse 1980–1984: Best of Modern English	Released: 16 March 2001; Label: 4AD; Formats: CD
Rarities and the Unreleased	Released: 15 June 2014; Label: Mi5 Recordings; Formats: digital download
Set List	Released: 2019; Label: Self-released; Formats: CD, LP, MC

== EPs ==
Title	Album details
Gathering Dust	Released: July 1983; Label: 4AD; Formats: 12"
Blister	Released: 31 August 2010; Label: Darla; Formats: CD, digital download
Daytrotter Session	Released: 30 June 2017; Label: Daytrotter; Formats: digital download

== Singles ==
Title	Year	Peak chart positions				Album
Title	Year	UK Indie	US	US Dance	US Rock	Album
"Drowning Man"/"Silent World"	1979	—	—	—	—	Non-album singles
"Swans on Glass"	1980	46	—	—	—	Non-album singles
"Gathering Dust"	1980	36	—	—	—	Non-album singles
"Smiles and Laughter"	1981	16	—	—	—	Non-album singles
"Life in the Gladhouse"	1982	26	—	—	—	After the Snow
"I Melt with You"	1982	18	78	60	7	After the Snow
"Someone's Calling"	1983	43	—	—	—	After the Snow
"Chapter 12"	1984	15	—	—	—	Ricochet Days
"Hands Across the Sea"	1984	—	91	—	47	Ricochet Days
"Ink and Paper"	1986	—	—	—	—	Stop Start
"I Melt with You" (re-recording)	1990	—	76	25	—	Pillow Lips
"Life's Rich Tapestry"	1990	—	—	—	—	Pillow Lips
"Beautiful People"	1991	—	—	—	—	Pillow Lips
"Elastic" (promo-only release)	1996	—	—	—	—	Everything's Mad
"It's OK"	2010	—	—	—	—	Soundtrack
"Sweet Revenge"	2017	—	—	—	—	Take Me to the Trees
"I Feel Small"	2017	—	—	—	—	Take Me to the Trees
"I Melt with You" (lockdown version)	2021	—	—	—	—	Non-album single
"—" denotes releases that did not chart or were not released in that territory.
