= Hands Across the Sea =

Hands Across the Sea may refer to:

== Film ==
- Hands Across the Sea (film), 1912 Australian silent film
- Hands Across the Sea (American film), 1912 film starring Dorothy Gibson

== Arts and entertainment ==
- Hands Across the Sea (play), short comic play by Noël Coward
- Hands Across the Sea (1887 play), by Henry Pettitt

== Music ==
- "Hands Across the Sea" (march), an 1899 military march composed by John Philip Sousa
- "Hands Across the Sea" (song), 1984 song by British band Modern English
- "Hands Across the Sea", 1974 song by British-Australian singer Olivia Newton-John from Long Live Love
- "Hands Across the Sea", 1958 song by British singer Shirley Bassey, B-side to the single "As I Love You"
- "Hands Across the Sea", 1974 song by British band the Dooleys
