= I Belong =

I Belong may refer to:

- "I Belong" (Candice Alley song)
- "I Belong" (Kathy Kirby song)
- I Belong (film), a 2012 Norwegian drama film
- "I Belong", a 2002 single by American singer Jive Jones
