= Sixteen Days =

Sixteen Days or 16 Days may refer to:

- Sixteen Days, English name of the Tamil-language Indian film Laadam based on Lucky Number Slevin
- Sixteen Days, 1939 novel by Hans Habe
- Sixteen Days/Gathering Dust, an EP and a medley by the band This Mortal Coil, based on two songs by Modern English
- "Sixteen Days", a 1981 song by the band Modern English from the album Mesh & Lace
- "16 Days" (song), a 1997 song by Ryan Adams, covered by the Clarks, Devil Doll and others
- "Sixteen Days", a 1998 song by The Appleseed Cast from album The End of the Ring Wars

== See also ==
- Sixteen Days of Glory, a 1986 American documentary
- 16 Days in Afghanistan, a 2007 American documentary
