= Dream the Day Away =

2003 single by Candice Alley

Single by Candice Alley

from the album Colorblind
- Released: 8 September 2003
- Recorded: 2003
- Genre: Pop, downtempo
- Length: 4:06
- Label: Universal Music Australia
- Songwriters: Candice Alley, Trevor Steel, John Holliday
- Producer: John Holliday

Candice Alley singles chronology
"Falling" (2003)	"Dream the Day Away" (2003)	"Before You Go" (2007)

"Dream the Day Away" is a song by Australian singer-songwriter Candice Alley. Alley co-wrote the song with Trevor Steel and John Holliday, who also produced the track. The song was released on 8 September 2003 as the second single from Alley's debut studio album, Colorblind (2003). The song peaked at number 45 on the Australian Singles Chart.

== Track listing ==
Australian CD single (9809427)

1. "Dream the Day Away" (Four on the Floor mix) – 4:06
2. "Falling" (Hot Snax remix) – 4:04
3. "Dream the Day Away" – 4:06

== Charts ==
Chart (2003)	Peak position
Australia (ARIA)	45
