= Before You Go (Candice Alley song) =

Single by Candice Alley

from the album Candice Alley
- Released: 17 January 2007
- Recorded: 2007
- Genre: Pop
- Length: 3:53
- Label: International Quarterback
- Songwriter(s): Candice Alley
- Producer(s): Michael Szumowski

Candice Alley singles chronology
"Dream the Day Away" (2003)	"Before You Go" (2007)	"I Belong" (2007)

"Before You Go" is a song written by Candice Alley. It was released in January 2007 as the lead single from her second studio album, Candice Alley (2007). The song peaked at number 16, becoming Alley's second top twenty single.

== Track listing ==
Australian CD single

1. "Before You Go"
2. "Before You Go" (acoustic version)
3. "Before You Go" (remix)
4. "Before You Go" (instrumental)

== Charts ==
=== Weekly charts ===
Chart (2007)	Peak position
Australia (ARIA)	16

=== Year-end charts ===
Chart (2007)	Position
Australian Artists (ARIA)	30
