= Candice Alley (album) =

Studio album by Candice Alley
- Released: 13 December 2007
- Recorded: 2004–2007
- Genre: Pop; pop rock
- Label: International Quarterback
- Producer: Michael Szumowski

Candice Alley chronology
Colorblind (2003)	Candice Alley (2007)

Singles from Candice Alley
- 1. "Before You Go" Released: 17 January 2007; 2. "I Belong" Released: July 2007

Candice Alley is the second studio album by Australian singer Candice Alley, released in Australia on 13 December 2007 by International Quarterback. Alley wrote all of the album, excluding one track co-written with Grant Hackett, her husband and an Australian Olympic swimmer. Produced by Michael Szumowski, Alley found it more comfortable to record this album than her first and she feels she has created something that she has always wanted. The album's lead single " Before You Go", released at the start of 2007, was the album's most successful single so far, giving Alley her second top twenty single in Australia. The album was only released to Australian iTunes.

== Content and production ==
Alley's first album Colorblind released in 2003 was made under the management of the label Universal, Alley found it frustrating with the lack of creative control she had. She states "The last album was much more ambient and there were much more co-writes – being with a major label you kinda have to compromise a bit – and being an independent artist now my new album’s very 'me' and I think I enjoyed this album a lot more than my last one. Though I'm sure everyone songwriter goes through that". Because Alley was an independent singer, she wrote all of the tracks herself, only with the help from her partner Grant Hackett. Alley states that Hackett will tell her if he does not like a song and he likes all of the tracks on the album and several songs were inspired by their relationship. She also states "This record is much more personal than Colorblind, and reflects where I am in my life at the moment". She states that she self-titled the album because it is an "extension of Alley" and the songs are so personal that it's like she's reading her diary.

Michael Szumowski was the lead producer for the album and Alley was happy to work with him. She states "Michael was great to work with because he listened and we both talked about each track before we went ahead. I think he knew it was at times a stressful experience for me because initially when you write songs and do demos you’re so used to the rawness of each song, it’s hard to go through the production stage and get used to hearing your songs with a massive sound behind them. Once that’s done it’s so rewarding hearing the final product come together". Szumowski states "This is an album of strong songs with strong melodies. There are no production tricks, just an old school way of doing the songs service. Candice writes melodies which become imbedded in your mind after three listens".

== Track listing ==
1. "I Belong" (Alley) – 3:36
2. "Hopeless" – 3:39
3. "Before You Go" (Alley) – 3:53
4. "Drifting" – 4:02
5. "Every Time" – 3:50
6. "World Keeps Turning" – 3:28
7. "That I Would" (Alley, Grant Hackett) – 3:08
8. "To Find You" – 4:06
9. "Yesterday" – 3:27
10. "Better Off" – 3:54
