= Rose Laurens =

French singer-songwriter

- Born: Rose Podwojny; 4 March 1951
- Origin: Paris
- Died: 29 April 2018 (aged 67) Paris
- Genres: Pop
- Occupations: Singer, songwriter
- Years active: 1976–2018
- Label: Flarenasch

Rose Laurens, previously billed as Rose Merryl (born Rose Podwojny; 4 March 1951 – 29 April 2018), was a French-Polish singer-songwriter, known for her 1982 single "Africa", a top-three hit in several European countries. She was also famous for portraying the character of Fantine, on the original 1980 French concept album of Les Misérables, singing "L'air de la misère" and "J'avais rêvé d'une autre vie" two songs later adapted into English as "On My Own" and "I Dreamed a Dream" respectively.

== Discography ==
=== Albums ===
- 1972 : Sandrose with Jean-Pierre Alarcen's eponymous band, one of the first and best French progressive-rock albums
- 1980 : Les Misérables ("L'air de la misère", "J'avais rêvé d'une autre vie"...)
- 1982 : Déraisonnable
- 1983 : Vivre ("Mamy Yoko", "Zodiacale", "T'envole pas sans moi", "Esméralda", "Chasseur d'images"...)
- 1984 : Africa – Voodoo Master ("Magic and music", "Misunderstanding", "I Need to Give", "Living in Your Song"...)
- 1986 : Écris ta vie sur moi ("Quand tu pars", "La Nuit", "Je me jette à l'eau", "Profession reporter"...)
- 1990 : J'te prêterai jamais
- 1995 : Envie
- 2001 : L'ombre d'un géant
- 2015 : DNA

=== Compilations ===
- 1986 : Rose Laurens – Compilation ("Quand tu pars", "Africa", "Mamy Yoko", "Vivre", "Je me jette à l'eau", "Profession reporter"...)
- 1991 : 17 Grands Succès de Rose Laurens (Quebec)
- 1996 : "The Very Best of Rose Laurens" ("Partir", "La Négresse blanche", "Écris ta vie sur moi", "Le Cœur chagrin", "Africa"...)

=== Singles ===
- 1976 : "In Space" (under the name Rose Merryl)
- 1977 : "L'Après amour" (under the name Rose Merryl)
- 1978 : "Je suis à toi" (under the name Rose Merryl)
- 1979 : "Survivre" (#45 in France)
- 1979 : "À deux"
- 1980 : "J'vous aime les oiseaux"
- 1980 : "L'Air de la misère"
- 1981 : "Pas facile"
- 1982 : "Africa" (#1 in France)
- 1983 : "Africa (Voodoo Master)" (export) (#1 in Austria, No. 2 in Switzerland, No. 2 in Norway, No. 3 in West Germany)
- 1983 : "Mamy Yoko" (#10 in France)
- 1983 : "Mamy Yoko" (export) (#37 in West Germany)
- 1983 : "Vivre" (#18 in France)
- 1984 : "Danse moi" (#66 in France)
- 1984 : "Night Sky" (export) (#12 in Sweden)
- 1985 : "Cheyenne" (#75 in France)
- 1985 : "Quand tu pars" (written by Francis Cabrel, No. 41 in France)
- 1986 : "American Love" (export)
- 1986 : "La Nuit" (#53 in France)
- 1987 : "Où vont tous ceux qu'on aime ?"
- 1989 : "Africa – Mégamix 89"
- 1990 : "J'te prêterai jamais" (#96 in France)
- 1991 : "Il a les yeux d'un ange"
- 1994 : "Africa – Remix 94" (Germany)
- 1995 : "Nous c'est fou"
- 2001 : "Pour aimer plus fort" (#40 in France)
- 2015 : "Si j'pars sur une île"

=== Collaborations ===
- 1994 : Yves Duteil – Entre Elles et Moi – Song "Écris ta vie sur moi" in duet with Yves Duteil
- 1995 : Gay Anthems – U.S. Compilation – Song "American love"
