= Colorblind (Candice Alley album) =

Studio album by Candice Alley
- Released: 22 September 2003
- Recorded: London
- Studio: Sphere Studios
- Length: 53:45
- Label: Universal

Candice Alley chronology
Colorblind (2003)	Candice Alley (2007)

Singles from Colorblind
- 1. "Falling" Released: 26 May 2003; 2. "Dream the Day Away" Released: 8 September 2003

Colorblind is the first album by Australian singer Candice Alley, released in Australia on 23 September 2003 by Universal Music Group. The album is a mix between an Alternative rock and pop songs – written and co-written by Alley and album producers John Holliday, Trevor Steel and Peter-John Vettese. The album debuted on the Australian ARIA Albums Chart outside the top fifty at number sixty-four and spent two weeks in the top one hundred. Two singles were released from the album in Australia; "Falling", became Alley's first top ten single and was nominated for an ARIA Award and "Dream the Day Away" was a minor hit just peaking in the top fifty.

Alley decided to start recording the album in February 2003 and went to London. She met with producers and songwriters John Holliday, Trevor Steel and Peter-John Vettese to help with the album, she found them clever and complex people and she thought it was nice that they listened to what she said. The album saw Alley writing songs with Holliday, Steel and Vettese, which is something she never does because she writes on her own and she prefers writing on her own.

== Singles ==
- "Falling" was released in Australia on 26 May 2003 as Alley's lead single. Released as a CD single, fellow album tracks "You Will Stay" and "Leaning on My Shoulder" were also included on the single's track listing. "Falling" debuted at number fifteen on the Australian Singles Chart in the issue dated 2 June 2003, becoming Alley's first top twenty single. Four weeks later it reached its peak of number five on the charts.
- "Dream the Day Away" was released as the second and final single in September 2003. It peaked at number 45 in Australia.

== Track listing ==
Credits adapted from the liner notes of Colorblind.

Colorblind – Standard edition
No.	Title	Writer(s)	Producer(s)	Length
1.	"Falling"	Candice Alley	Peter-John Vettese	3:58
2.	"My Heaven"	Alley; John Holliday; Anders Kallmark; Trevor Steel	Holliday; Steel	3:24
3.	"Shadow in Me"	Alley	Vettese	5:12
4.	"Dream the Day Away"	Alley; Holliday; Steel	Holliday; Steel	4:04
5.	"Surfacing"	Alley; Vettese	Vettese	3:43
6.	"You Will Stay"	Alley	Holliday; Steel	3:01
7.	"To Find You"	Alley	Kevin Bacon; Jonathan Quarmby	4:23
8.	"Tongue Tied"	Alley; Elenni; Rick Mitra	Vettese	4:14
9.	"In My Hands"	Alley	Vettese	3:22
10.	"She Dreams"	Alley	Vettese	4:05
11.	"Uncertainty"	Alley; Holliday; Steel	Holliday; Steel	4:17
12.	"Leaning on My Shoulder"	Alley	Holliday; Steel	3:43
13.	"It's in My Head"	Alley; Vettese	Vettese	4:16
14.	"Colorblind"	Alley; Vettese	Vettese	1:58
Total length:				53:45

== Charts ==
Chart (2003)	Peak position
Australian Albums (ARIA)	64

== Release history ==
List of release dates, showing region, release format, label and catalog number
Region	Date	Format	Label	Catalog	Ref
Australia	22 September 2003	Compact disc	Universal Music Australia	9811126	
