= Sholom Katz =

Jewish rabbi

- Born: April 4, 1914; Oradea, Romania
- Died: February 20, 1982 (aged 67); Walter Reed Army Medical Center, Bethesda, Maryland, United States
- Occupations: Rabbi and cantor
- Spouse: Sabina Katz

Sholom Katz (April 4, 1914 - February 20, 1982) was a Jewish cantor and rabbi.

== Early life ==
Sholom was born in Nagyvárad, Hungary, (nowadays Oradea, Romania) on April 4, 1914. By age 13 he was a recognized cantor. At age 18 he was ordained a rabbi and was cantor for a synagogue in Chișinău, a Jewish center in Romania (nowadays Moldova). During World War II Sholom was deported to a Nazi internment camp in Bralow, Ukraine. According to Katz, he sang the jewish prayer for the dead and the officer in charge was so moved by his voice that he spared him and allowed him to escape to freedom.

== Career ==
In 1946 Sholom was invited to Switzerland to sing at the World Zionist Congress. He sang the "Keil Molei Rachamim” while Chaim Weizmann gave a eulogy for Jews who had died during the Second World War. His singing of "Keil Molei Rachamim” was later awarded by Paris Match as their annual "Prix du Disque".

Sholom immigrated to America in 1947, where he became a cantor at Beth Sholom Congregation in Washington, D.C. He remained a cantor there until the year 1957. He made more than 160 recordings of his own music. Sholom sang for the closing scene of The Garden of the Finzi-Continis and also sang for the film, The Eichmann Story.

== Personal life and death ==
Sholom was married to Sabrina Katz. They had two children, Benjamin Katz, and a daughter, Judith Katz. Katz died at Walter Reed Army Medical Center in Bethesda, Maryland, after a heart attack. He was 67 years old.
