= Stop Start =

Studio album by Modern English
- Released: 1986
- Studio: Genetic and Trident
- Genre: Rock, pop, new wave
- Label: Sire
- Producer: Stephen Stewart-Short

Modern English chronology
Ricochet Days (1984)	Stop Start (1986)	Pillow Lips (1990)

Singles from Stop Start
- 1. "Ink and Paper" Released: 1986

Stop Start is the fourth album by the English band Modern English, released in 1986. The band supported the album with a North American tour that included shows with Afrika Bambaataa and A Flock of Seagulls. "Ink and Paper" was the first single. Due to the band's popularity, the album was first released in the United States. Stop Start peaked a No. 154 on the Billboard 200.

== Production ==
Modern English adopted a more conventional rock sound on Stop Start; work on it was delayed for almost two years while the band dealt with record label issues. In the interim, two original members of the group—keyboardist Stephen Walker and drummer Richard Brown—both departed, making Stop Start the first Modern English album recorded without the full original band. By the time recording sessions began, Aaron Davidson had joined the band as a replacement for Walker on keyboards, while also contributing additional guitar. Drums on the album were handled by session drummer Graham Broad, as Brown was not officially replaced in the group at the time. Gary Barnacle played saxophone. The Rubinoos' Tommy Dunbar cowrote "Ink and Paper". The band multiplied the vocals on many of the tracks.

== Critical reception ==
Professional ratings
Review scores
Source	Rating
AllMusic	3/5 stars
MusicHound Rock: The Essential Album Guide	2.5/5 stars
Record-Journal	B−
The Rolling Stone Album Guide	2/5 stars
The Sheboygan Press	4/4 stars

The Orlando Sentinel called the album "almost entirely up-tempo and danceable." The Gazette determined that it "seems regressive with songs that lack the character of previous work... Lyrically the material is more straightforward; musically it is less adventurous." The Ottawa Citizen noted that Modern English's "dreamy keyboard laden pop has given away to terse guitar rock," writing that "the band sometimes yields to the temptation to stuff keyboards into the arrangements where they are not needed, adding noisiness to what ought to be streamlined and straight-ahead."

The Kingston Whig-Standard concluded that "a crisp beat, high, soaring harmonies and an energetic melodic sound make them unbeatable." The Omaha World-Herald opined that, "despite numerous pop hooks and snappy guitar work, Modern English hovers just short of being dull." The Seattle Times labeled Stop Start "a rather bland collection of new wave tunes, with the exception of the lively 'Breaking Away' and the intriguing 'Ink and Paper'."

AllMusic deemed the album a "rather regrettable, overtly commercial album which impressed no one."

== Track listing ==
All songs written Modern English, except "Ink and Paper", co-written by Tommy Dunbar, Kelly Solloum, and Modern English

No.	Title	Length
1.	"The Border"	4:04
2.	"Ink and Paper"	3:58
3.	"Night Train"	3:10
4.	"I Don't Know the Answer"	3:08
5.	"Love Breaks Down"	5:29
6.	"Breaking Away"	4:00
7.	"The Greatest Show"	4:52
8.	"Love Forever"	3:16
9.	"Start Stop Stop Start"	5:42

== Personnel ==
Based on liner notes to the Stop Start album.

Modern English

- Robbie Grey: lead vocals
- Mick Conroy: bass, guitar
- Gary McDowell: guitars
- Aaron Davidson: keyboards, guitar

Additional musicians

- Tony Lowe: guitars
- Gary Barnacle: horns [sic] (saxophone)
- Graham Broad: drums
- Neil O'Connor: programming
