= After the Snow =

Studio album by Modern English
- Released: 23 April 1982
- Studio: Rockfield (Rockfield, Wales)
- Genre: New wave, post-punk
- Length: 38:30
- Label: 4AD
- Producer: Hugh Jones, Modern English

Modern English chronology
Mesh & Lace (1981)	After the Snow (1982)	Ricochet Days (1984)

Singles from After the Snow
- 1. "Life in the Gladhouse" Released: 7 June 1982; 2. "I Melt with You" Released: 9 August 1982; 3. "Someone's Calling" Released: 1 September 1983

After the Snow is the second studio album by Modern English, released in April 1982 by 4AD in the United Kingdom, Vertigo Records in Canada, and Sire Records in the United States. It spawned three singles, including the worldwide hit "I Melt with You".

== Content ==
It features the original recording of the tune "I Melt with You", which the band would later re-record in 1990 for their album Pillow Lips. The song "After The Snow" has two speed fluctuations on the original LP which may or may not be intentional.

== Reception ==
Professional ratings
Review scores
Source	Rating
AllMusic	4/5 stars
The Rolling Stone Album Guide	3/5 stars

Record reviewer Nick Burton gave After the Snow a mixed review, saying that the album's eccentric mix of genres and styles lacks direction but is interesting nonetheless. He warned readers that the hit "I Melt with You" is completely unrepresentative of the album, and concluded that "If nothing else, After the Snow provides some offbeat, if not unintentionally amusing, listening." The Rolling Stone Album Guide dismissed most of the album as "bland dance pop."

=== Certifications ===
Region	Certification	Certified units/sales
United States (RIAA)	Gold	500,000^{^}
^{^} Shipments figures based on certification alone.

== Track listing ==
All songs written and arranged by Richard Brown, Michael Conroy, Robbie Grey, Gary McDowell, and Stephen Walker.

Side one
No.	Title	Length
1.	"Someone's Calling"	4:01
2.	"Life in the Gladhouse"	4:38
3.	"Face of Wood"	5:56
4.	"Dawn Chorus"	4:45

Side two
No.	Title	Length
5.	"I Melt with You"	4:11
6.	"After the Snow"	3:51
7.	"Carry Me Down"	5:25
8.	"Tables Turning"	4:33

1992 CD Bonus Tracks
No.	Title	Length
9.	"Someone's Calling" (Remix)	3:46
10.	"Life in the Gladhouse" (Remix)	5:00
11.	"I Melt with You" (7" Mix)	3:49
12.	"The Prize"	3:32
13.	"Life in the Gladhouse" (12" Mix)	5:56
14.	"The Choicest View"	11:39

== Personnel ==
Modern English

- Robbie Grey – vocals
- Gary McDowell – guitars
- Stephen Walker – keyboards
- Michael Conroy – bass, violin
- Richard Brown – drums, percussion

Additional personnel

- Hugh Jones – additional keyboards, backing vocals, production, engineering
- Faith – flute on "Carry Me Down"
