= Hana Kobayashi =

Venezuelan singer of Japanese descent (born 1982)

- Born: 19 March 1982 (age 43); Maracay, Venezuela
- Occupation: Singer
- Parent(s): Nancy Trujillo; Seiichi Kobayashi

Hana Kobayashi (born 19 March 1982) is a Venezuelan singer of Japanese descent.

== Biography ==
Daughter of a Venezuelan mother and a Japanese father, Kobayashi began her musical education when she was fourteen years old, studying in conservatories such as the National Conservatory of Music Juan José Landaeta in the state of Aragua, and the University Institute of Musical Education in Caracas. She took classes from figures such as Félix Fórmental, Gisella Hollander, Marisela Leal and Magdalena León. Since 2003, when she began to permanently reside in Caracas, she started working in genres such as pop, jazz, rock, soul and R&B. In 2005 she was invited to debut and took part in Japan's Cultural Week. She also participated in the first season of Latin American Idol.

She has visited countries such as Scotland, Spain, Czech Republic, United Arab Emirates, Colombia, Argentina, Italy, United States, Panama, Mexico and Brazil, and has participated as a guest singer with both national and international artists, including Gerry Weil, Diva Gash, Siudy Garrido and Rodrigo Gonsalves from Viniloversus. She has also participated as a singer and composer in Embas, Míxtura and their second album Animal de Viento, the electronic group Diva Gash and their albums Vol. 1 and 2. Lov, the compiled homage to Aldemaro Romero Nueva Onda Nueva, and El Arca and their debut album Buen Viaje.

In August 2012 she was chosen by the Goethe-Institut to represent Venezuela in the project Music in Transit, carried out in Salvador de Bahia, Brazil, which launched in March 2013. She participated with six other Latin American artists to record together with the German electronic musician Markus Popp. She has been recognized by Amnesty International along with other artists as an "Awareness Transmitter" while supporting the Basta de Balas (Enough of Bullets) campaign against the sale and carrying of firearms. She is also, along other Venezuelan artists, an ambassador for the Remángate campaign to raise awareness about anti-personnel mines.
