= Soundtrack (Modern English album) =

Studio album by Modern English
- Released: 24 May 2010
- Recorded: Chapel Studios, Lincolnshire, UK
- Length: 42:40
- Label: Darla
- Producer: Hugh Jones

Modern English chronology
Everything's Mad (1996)	Soundtrack (2010)	Take Me to the Trees (2016)

Professional ratings
Review scores
Source	Rating
AllMusic	4/5 stars

Soundtrack is the seventh studio album by the English rock band Modern English; it was released in 2010, marking their first studio album since Everything's Mad (1996). Produced by Hugh Jones, it is the band's first album to be released on Darla Records.

== Track listing ==
All tracks are written by Modern English.

No.	Title	Length
1.	"It's Ok"	3:13
2.	"Blister"	2:55
3.	"Bomb"	2:44
4.	"Soundtrack"	6:06
5.	"Call Me"	5:05
6.	"Here Comes the Failure"	3:13
7.	"The Lowdown"	5:05
8.	"Up Here in the Brain"	3:12
9.	"Deep Sea Diver"	3:29
10.	"Antique Future"	1:49
11.	"Fin"	5:49
Total length:		42:40

== Personnel ==
- Robbie Grey: Vocals
- Steven Walker: Guitars
- Matthew Shipley: Keyboards
- Nik Williams: Bass
- Jon Solomon: Drums
