= I Belong (Candice Alley song) =

Single by Candice Alley

from the album Candice Alley
- Released: 21 July 2007
- Recorded: 2007
- Genre: Pop
- Length: 3:37
- Label: International Quarterback
- Songwriter(s): Candice Alley
- Producer(s): Michael Szumowski

Candice Alley singles chronology
"Before You Go" (2007)	"I Belong" (2007)

"I Belong" is a pop song written by Candice Alley and produced by Michael Szumowski for Alley's second album Candice Alley (2007). It was released as the album's second single in Australia on 21 July 2007 as a CD single and digital download. Alley commented: "I Belong is about moving on and being optimistic – about letting go of old things. It's a positive song". She wrote the song in 2003 while writing her previous hit "Falling", and was excited when she saw it in production, she said: "It's great when something you have written has been given a pulse. I can hear and see it now thanks to the video and that is a great feeling". Producer Szumowski stated: "It was one of the first songs we started working on. It's got a chorus that creeps up and hits you, and I loved it straight away". The song failed to chart on the Australian ARIA Singles Chart, but peaked at number eight on the Australian Independent Singles Chart.

The music video was directed by Grant Marshall and filmed at Movie World Studios at the Gold Coast, Queensland, Australia in June 2007. Alley had considered filming the video in Sydney or Melbourne, where she is based, but decided it would be better to film it in the Gold Coast. It is a simple clip of Alley playing guitar with her three piece band on a stage wearing a black top, jeans and black heels. "It sort of has an Indy-glam feel about it. It's very sparse, warehouse type setting but it really brings out the best in Candice because she looks great" states Marshall. The video was released in July 2007 and received minor play.

== Track listing ==
1. "I Belong" – 3:37
2. "I Belong" (dance mix) – 4:24
3. "I Belong" (acoustic) – 3:30

== Charts ==
Chart (2007)	Peak position
Australian AIR Singles	8
