= Candice Alley =

Australian singer-songwriter (born 1982)

- Born: Candice Marie Giannarelli; 23 June 1982 (age 44)
- Origin: Melbourne, Australia
- Genre: Pop
- Occupations: Singer; songwriter
- Instruments: Vocals; piano; guitar
- Years active: 2003–present
- Labels: Universal (2000–2004); International Quarterback (2006–2007)
- Website: candicealley.com.au

Candice Marie Giannarelli, better known as Candice Alley (born 23 June 1982) is an Australian singer-songwriter of Italian descent. She was married to Australian swimming captain Grant Hackett from 2007 until 2013.

== Music career ==
Alley was born in Melbourne. At the age of sixteen, she wrote her debut single, "Falling", which only took her twenty minutes to write. She started to shop her demos around the various independent labels in her home town of Melbourne and one of her tapes found its way onto the desk of Universal Music's chairman, Peter Bond. He liked what he heard and flew down from Sydney to catch Alley at a showcase. She was signed to the label at the age of eighteen.

In February 2003, Alley went to write and record in London with songwriters and producers John Holiday, Trevor Steele and Peter Vettese. On 26 May 2003, she released her first single "Falling" which went on to peak at number five on the Australian ARIA Singles Chart and was nominated for an award at the 2003 ARIA Awards for "Breakthrough Artist – Single" but lost to "Born to Try" by Delta Goodrem. Her first studio album Colorblind was released on 23 October 2003, and debuted in the ARIA Album Chart at position sixty-four. The second single "Dream the Day Away" did not follow the success of "Falling", only debuting at number forty-five. On 2 October 2003, Alley opened the seventeenth annual ARIA Awards performing the song "Falling". In 2004 she split with her record label Universal Records because she was not happy with the lack of control she had.

In May 2005, Alley's manager organised a distribution contract with MGM Distribution independent label International Quarterback and she went abroad to write for twenty months and worked with producer Michael Szumowski. It was announced in late 2006 that Alley was releasing her new single, "Before You Go", on 13 January 2007. The song took a while to chart but with the combination of CD and digital downloads the song managed to become a top twenty hit peaking at number sixteen. Her husband, Grant Hackett, has a songwriting credit on the album and is the only other credited writer besides Alley. She also performed live at the David Jones fashion show, the AFL 2007 season launch and supported Chris Isaak on his The Best Of tour in Melbourne.

Through Candice's success on her second album a United States Dance label Pro Motion approached her to do a remix of the 2003 debut single "Falling", which charted on the U.S. Billboard Hot Dance Club Play and went on to peak at number thirty-eight.

== Television ==
From 2015 to 2016, Alley had a recurring guest role on Australian television series Neighbours as Cecilia Saint.

== Personal life ==
Alley met Australian swimmer Grant Hackett when she was invited to sing at the "Swimmer of the Year" dinner in 2004. They married in Albert Park, Melbourne on 14 April 2007. On 16 March 2009, Hackett's manager Chris White confirmed Alley and Hackett were expecting twins. In September 2009, Alley gave birth to the twins – a boy named Jagger Emilio and a girl named Charlize Alley.

On 29 October 2011, police were called to attend a dispute at Alley and Hackett's Melbourne apartment, which was reportedly found in disarray. The couple did not publicly elaborate on the events of the evening, however Hackett admitted to being "overwhelmingly embarrassed" by his behaviour, with Alley claiming in the following weeks that she and her husband were "immensely in love", "overwhelmingly happy" and that their relationship was "100% amazing" in spite of the incident.

On 3 May 2012, Alley and Hackett announced they were separating; they divorced in August 2013.

== Discography ==
=== Studio albums ===
Title	Details	Peak chart positions
Title	Details	AUS
Colorblind	Released: 22 September 2003; Label: Universal	64
Candice Alley	Released: 12 December 2007; Label: International Quarterback	—

=== Singles ===
Title	Year	Peak chart positions			Certification	Album
Title	Year	AUS	NZ	US Dance	Certification	Album
"Falling"	2003	5	15	38	ARIA: Gold	Colorblind
"Dream the Day Away"	2003	45	—	—		Colorblind
"Before You Go"	2007	16	—	54		Candice Alley
"I Belong"	2007	—	—	—		Candice Alley

== Awards and nominations ==
=== ARIA Music Awards ===
The ARIA Music Awards is an annual awards ceremony that recognises excellence, innovation, and achievement across all genres of Australian music.

Year	Nominee / work	Award	Result
2003	"Falling"	Breakthrough Artist – Single	Nominated

=== APRA Awards ===
The APRA Awards are held in Australia and New Zealand by the Australasian Performing Right Association to recognise songwriting skills, sales and airplay performance by its members annually.

Year	Nominee / work	Award	Result
2004	"Falling"	Most Performed Australian Single	Nominated
