= Modern English (band) =

New wave/post-punk band

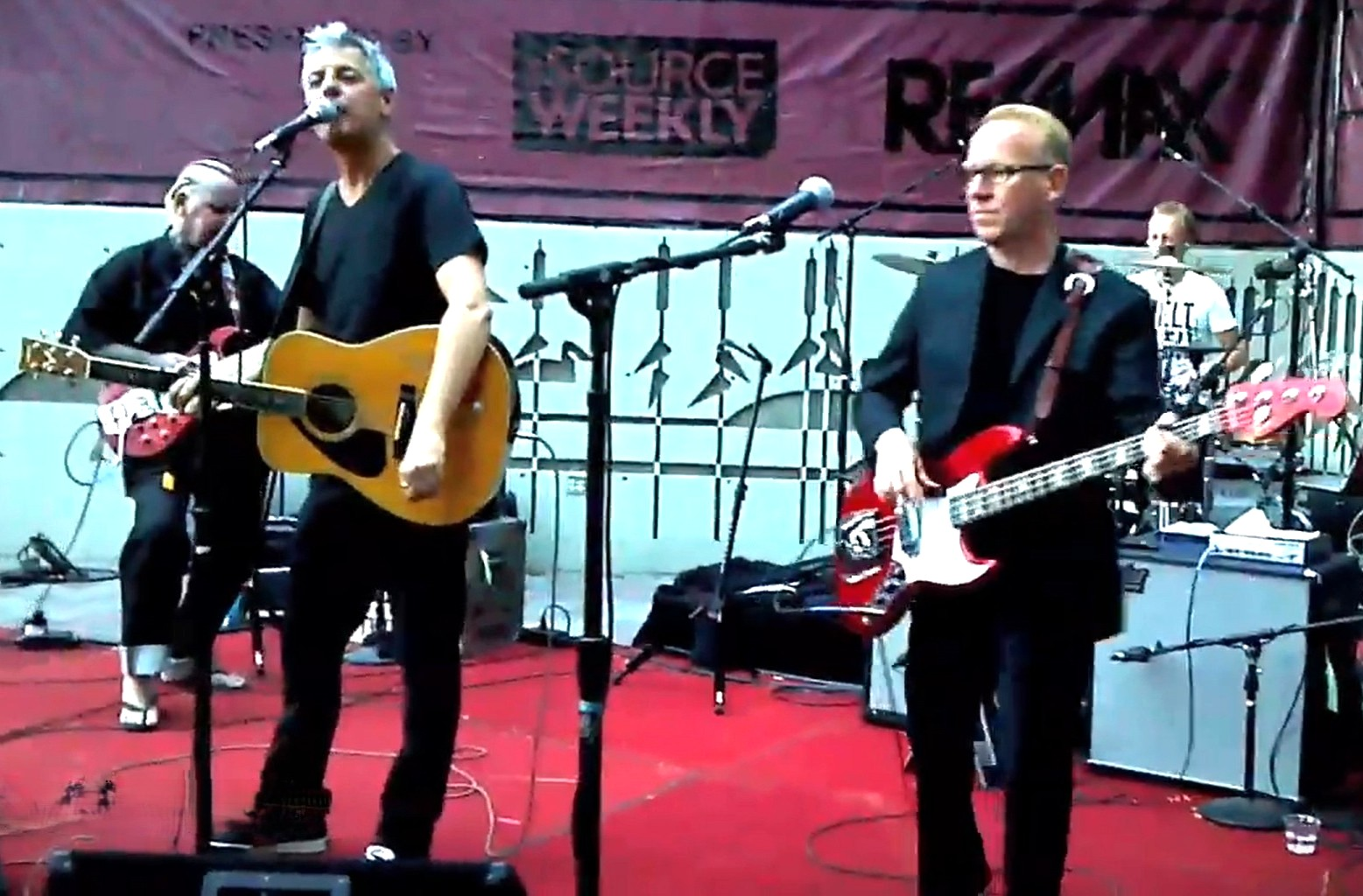
- Modern English in 2012 (L–R): Gary McDowell, Robbie Grey, Michael Conroy, Richard Chandler

Background information
- Also known as: The Lepers
- Origin: Colchester, Essex, England
- Genres: New wave; post-punk
- Works: Modern English discography
- Years active: 1979–1987; 1989–1991; 1995–present
- Labels: 4AD; Sire; TVT; Darla; Mesh & Lace
- Members: Robbie Grey; Gary McDowell; Michael Conroy; Steven Walker; Roy Martin
- Past members: Richard Brown; Aaron Davidson; Steven Walker (guitarist); Matthew Shipley; Ric Chandler; Jon Solomon
- Website: modernenglish.me

Modern English are an English new wave post-punk rock band formed in 1979 in Colchester, Essex, England. They are best known for their songs "I Melt with You", "Hands Across the Sea" and "Ink and Paper". The group disbanded in 1987, but re-formed two years later and then disbanded again in 1991. They reunited again in 1995 and have continued in various line-ups since then.

== History ==
Formed in Colchester, Essex, in 1979 by Robbie Grey (vocals), Gary McDowell (guitar, vocals), and Michael Conroy (bass, vocals) (born 9 August 1962), Modern English were originally known as The Lepers. The group expanded to "Modern English" when Richard Brown (drums) and Steven Walker (keyboards) were added to the line-up of the band.

After a single on their own 'Limp' label (not to be confused with America's Limp Records) in 1979, the band signed to 4AD the following year; with two further singles released, and a session for John Peel of BBC Radio 1 recorded before the band's debut album, Mesh & Lace, in 1981. In the band's early days, they showed a strong Joy Division influence. A second Peel session was recorded in October 1981. The second album, After the Snow (April 1982), was more keyboard-oriented and was compared to Simple Minds and Duran Duran. It was also released in the US by Sire Records the following year, where it reached number 70 on the Billboard chart, and sold over 500,000 copies. Grey said of the album, "We used to think 'God, we'll never make a pop record. We're artists!', but things don't always turn out as you planned and when you actually create a pop record, it's so much more of a thrill than anything else". The second single from the album was also a hit in the US, "I Melt with You" reaching number 76. When he reviewed the album, Johnny Waller of Sounds described the track as "A dreamy, creamy celebration of love and lust, which deserves to be showcased on as 12" single all by itself, with no B-side", while his colleague Tony Mitchell described it as "suburban amateurism at its most unrewarding". The band relocated to New York City and worked on a third album, Ricochet Days, which again made the top 100 in the US, after which the band left 4AD and were solely signed to Sire outside the UK and Canada. By the time the band convened to record a subsequent album, keyboardist Stephen Walker and drummer Richard Brown had both exited. The album Stop Start (1986), featuring new keyboardist/additional guitarist Aaron Davidson, and session drummer Graham Broad, was the last Modern English record released by Sire, with the band splitting up after its release. During 1983–1984, Grey, McDowell and Conroy were also involved with This Mortal Coil.

Grey re-formed Modern English with Conroy and Davidson in 1989 to record a new album, Pillow Lips, released in 1990 on the American TVT label. The album featured a re-recorded "I Melt with You", which was released as a single, and saw the band again in the Billboard top 100. The band split up for a second time in 1991, after contractual problems with TVT, and Grey formed Engine. In 1995, with legal issues with TVT sorted out, Engine evolved into the next incarnation of Modern English and signed to the Imago label, with Grey and Matthew Shipley (keyboards). This lineup recorded the 1996 album Everything's Mad.

Grey toured the US with a new line-up between 1998 and 2002, and recorded a new album with Hugh Jones, who had been producer of earlier Modern English records. The songs written with guitarist Steven Walker (not to be confused with the band's original keyboardist) and including Shipley came together on the road and back home in London between tours. After a few years on the shelf, this collection of songs, entitled Soundtrack, was released on 24 May 2010 on Darla, with Jon Solomon on drums.

The original line-up (minus drummer Brown) re-formed in 2010 and toured the US in July and September, and the UK and Paris in June the following year. They were invited by film director Mark Pellington to re-record "I Melt with You" once again for his film of the same name. They recorded an album titled Take Me To The Trees, which was funded via Pledge with an originally planned March 2016 release date. The album was recorded, produced and mixed by Martyn Young from Colourbox and MARRS, who also adds additional keyboards. They also toured the Mesh & Lace album in the US in 2016.

The band performed at SXSW in 2017 and toured in support of Take Me To The Trees in the same year. In 2019 they toured the U.S. with The Alarm and Gene Loves Jezebel. In 2022 the band toured the U.S. celebrating the 40th anniversary of 1982's After The Snow album and performed on The Tonight Show Starring Jimmy Fallon and NBC's Today show. In late 2022 the band recorded 10 new songs.

The band played at the Cruel World Festival in Pasadena, California, on 20 May 2023. They toured the U.S. in 2023, and held a number of radio sessions to preview songs from their new album, 1 2 3 4, which was released on 23 February 2024.

The current line-up includes original members Grey, Conroy, McDowell, and Walker, with Gabriel Sullivan on guitar and Roy Martin on drums.

In October 2026, the band released an English-language cover of the Malaria! song "Kaltes Klares Wasser". The song appears exclusively on the compilation album "Wir Schweigen Nicht / We Will Not Be Silent" which benefits the White Rose foundation in Munich, Germany.

== Members ==
Members of Modern English at The Saint in Asbury Park, New Jersey; August 2013
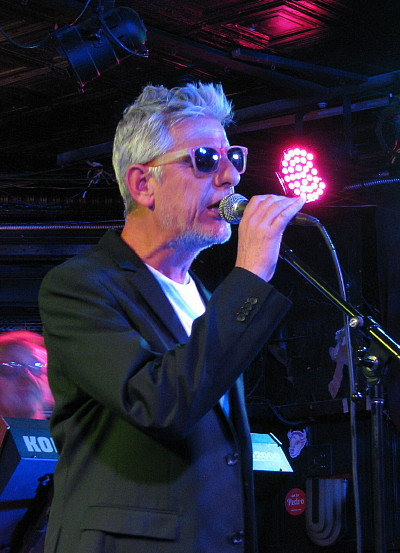
Robbie Grey

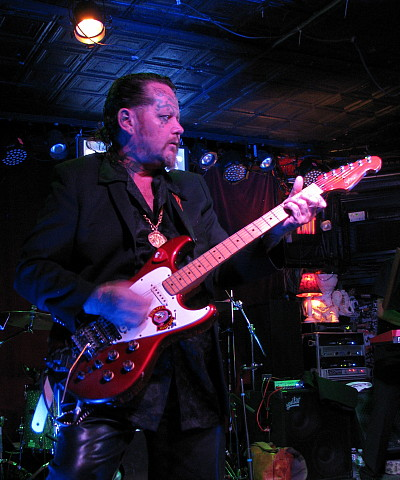
Gary McDowell

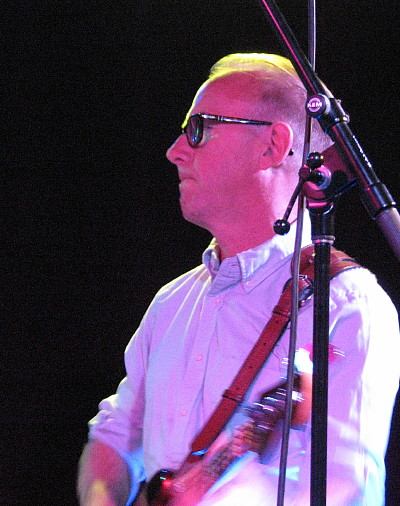
Michael Conroy

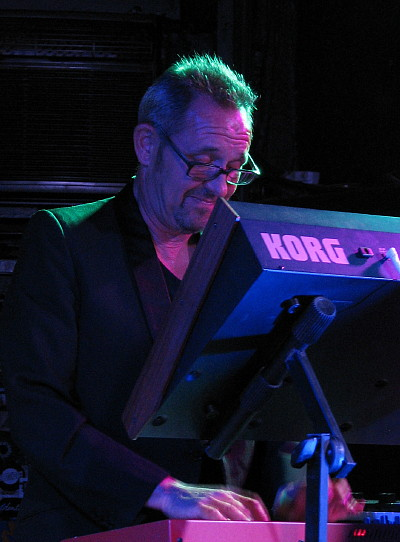
Stephen Walker

== Discography ==
- Mesh & Lace (1981)
- After the Snow (1982)
- Ricochet Days (1984)
- Stop Start (1986)
- Pillow Lips (1990)
- Everything's Mad (1996)
- Soundtrack (2010)
- Take Me to the Trees (2016)
- 1 2 3 4 (2024)
- Kaltes Klares Wasser (single) (2026)
