= Falling (Candice Alley song) =

2003 single by Candice Alley

Single by Candice Alley

from the album Colorblind
- Released: 26 May 2003
- Genre: Pop
- Length: 3:58
- Label: Universal Music Australia
- Songwriter(s): Candice Alley
- Producer(s): Peter-John Vettese

Candice Alley singles chronology
"Falling" (2003)	"Dream the Day Away" (2003)

"Falling" is a song written and performed by Australian singer-songwriter Candice Alley. It was released as the lead single from her debut studio album, Colorblind (2003), on 26 May 2003. The song peaked at number five on the Australian ARIA Singles Chart in July and was certified gold.

== Track listings ==
Australian CD single (0199682)

1. "Falling"
2. "You Will Stay"
3. "Leaning On My Shoulder"

US remix single

1. "Falling" (Fred Falke Vocal Mix)
2. "Falling" (Fred Falke Vocal Dub)
3. "Falling" (Fred Radio Edit)

== Charts ==
=== Weekly charts ===
Chart (2003)	Peak position
Australia (ARIA)	5
New Zealand (Recorded Music NZ)	15

=== Year-end charts ===
Chart (2003)	Position
Australia (ARIA)	55
Australian Artists (ARIA)	10

== Certification ==
Region	Certification	Certified units/sales
Australia (ARIA)	Gold	35,000^{^}
^{^} Shipments figures based on certification alone.
