= Ricochet Days =

Studio album by Modern English
- Released: 10 February 1984
- Studio: Rockfield Studios, Monmouth, Wales
- Genre: New wave, post-punk
- Length: 38:37
- Label: 4AD
- Producer: Hugh Jones, Modern English

Modern English chronology
After the Snow (1982)	Ricochet Days (1984)	Stop Start (1986)

Ricochet Days is the third album by Modern English, released in 1984 by 4AD in the United Kingdom, Vertigo Records in Canada, and Sire Records in the United States. The album peaked at number 93 on the Billboard 200.

== Reception ==
Professional ratings
Review scores
Source	Rating
AllMusic	2.5/5 stars

AllMusic reviewer Alex Ogg gave Ricochet Days a mixed review, saying that it began Modern English's "slow decline toward the status of just another synth band." He warned readers that "the material, though beautifully produced by the reliable Hugh Jones and boasting some pliable hooks, lacks the conviction and attack of old. 'Hands Across the Sea' and 'Spinning Me Round' are serviceable but hardly vital additions to the band's songbook."

== Track listing ==
All songs written and arranged by Richard Brown, Michael Conroy, Robbie Grey, Gary McDowell, and Stephen Walker.

Side one
No.	Title	Length
1.	"Rainbows End"	3:06
2.	"Machines"	5:39
3.	"Spinning Me Round"	4:50
4.	"Ricochet Days"	5:12

Side two
No.	Title	Length
5.	"Hands Across the Sea"	4:53
6.	"Blue Waves"	4:00
7.	"Heart"	6:58
8.	"Chapter 12"	3:57

== Personnel ==
Modern English

- Robbie Grey – vocals
- Gary McDowell – guitars
- Stephen Walker – keyboards
- Michael Conroy – bass, violin
- Richard Brown – drums, percussion

Additional personnel

- Hugh Jones – additional keyboards, backing vocals, production, engineering
