= Africa (Rose Laurens song) =

Single by Rose Laurens

from the album Déraisonnable
- B-side: "Broken Heart"
- Released: October 1982 (french); March 1983 (english)
- Recorded: 1982
- Genre: Pop
- Length: 5:00 (album version); 3:28 (single version)
- Label: WEA
- Composer: Jean-Pierre Goussaud
- Lyricists: Jean-Michel Bériat (French); Elaine Stive (English)
- Producer: Jean-Pierre Goussaud

Rose Laurens singles chronology
"Pas facile" (1981)	"Africa" (1982)	"Africa (Voodoo Master)" (1983)

"Africa" is a 1982 song recorded by French singer Rose Laurens. It was one of the singles from her first album Déraisonnable and was released in France at the end of 1982. A version with English lyrics, titled "Africa (Voodoo Master)", was released worldwide in March 1983. The version available on the 7" is shorter than on the album, as the musical bridge is shortened and there are fewer refrains. It immediately became a smash hit in many countries, reaching the top of the charts. In 1994, a CD maxi of remixes was released, but failed to chart.

== Chart performance ==
"Africa" was a commercial success, reaching number one in Austria, and remained for 16 weeks in the top twenty. In Norway, it charted for 15 weeks in the top ten, including a peak at number two for two weeks. It also appeared for ten weeks in the top 15 in Switzerland, with a peak at number two. In West Germany, "Africa" charted for 23 weeks and peaked at number three in its fourth week. In France, there was no official singles chart then, but it reached Platinum status with a million copies sold.

== Cover versions ==
In 1983, German singer Ingrid Peters cover the song in German-language under the title "Afrika", which peaked at number 41 on the German Singles Chart. In 1993, the song was covered in English by Swiss duet Powerzone in a Euro house version; it reached number 18 on the Swiss Singles Chart and charted for five weeks.

== Track listings ==
- 7" single
1. "Africa (Voodoo Master)" — 3:28
2. "Broken Heart" — 3:43
- 7" single - 1989 remix
1. "Africa 89" — 3:35
2. "Africa" (instrumental) — 3:30
- CD maxi - 1994 remixes
1. "Africa" (remix '94) (Berlin single radio edit) — 3:21
2. "Africa" (remix '94) (Paris single radio edit) — 3:50
3. "Africa" (remix '94) (Berlin club mix) — 4:55
- 2022 Remixes
1. "Africa" (Superfunk Remix) - 2:58
2. "Africa" (Luke Mornay Remix) - 3:35
3. "Africa" (7th Heaven Remix) - 3:24
4. "Africa" (Superfunk Extended Remix) - 5:03
5. "Africa" (Luke Mornay Extended Remix) - 7:18
6. "Africa" (7th Heaven Extended Remix) - 5:24
7. "Africa" - 3:36

== Charts ==
=== Weekly charts ===
Weekly chart performance for "Africa"
Chart (1983)	Peak position
Austria (Ö3 Austria Top 40)	1
Finland (Suomen virallinen lista)	6
France (IFOP)	1
Norway (VG-lista)	2
Quebec (ADISQ)	3
Switzerland (Schweizer Hitparade)	2
West Germany (GfK)	3

=== Year-end charts ===
Year-end chart performance for "Africa"
Chart (1983)	Position
Austria (Ö3 Austria Top 40)	7
Switzerland (Schweizer Hitparade)	18
West Germany (GfK)	14

== Certifications ==
Certifications for "Africa"
Region	Certification	Certified units/sales
France (SNEP)	Platinum	1,000,000^{*}
Germany (BVMI)	Gold	500,000^{^}
^{*} Sales figures based on certification alone.^{^} Shipments figures based on certification alone.
