= Koço Uçi =

Albanian composer and conductor (1923–1982)

Koço Uçi (21 January 1923 – 7 April 1982) was an Albanian composer and conductor. He was part of a group of composers who wrote socialist and populist popular music for the Albanian state following World War II; with other contemporaries including Hysen Pelinku, Llazar Morcka, Kostandin Trako, Gaqo Avrazi, and Vath Çangu. Musicologist George Leotsakos stated in Grove Music Online that Uçi's "large output, almost exclusively vocal, includes settings of some of the best-known Albanian poets and covers almost every significant occasion in the national life of the period. His songs are simple and direct in their appeal, with an instinctive melodic elegance and sober but effective harmonizations."

== Life and career ==
Koço Uçi was born in Korçë on 21 January 1923. He relocated to Tirana sometime following the Italian invasion of Albania in 1939 but before the German occupation of Albania in 1943. He was trained as a musician in Tirana by the pianist and bandleader Vittorio Allogio. After Albania was liberated from Nazi Germany in 1944, he was employed by a theatre group connected to the Ministry of Economy, Culture and Innovation in the mid 1940s. From 1946 to 1949 he worked as a conductor at the Albania National Theatre, and from 1949 to 1951 he was a choral conductor of Albania's State Chorus.

After this Uçi was the principal conductor of the chorus of the Albanian People's Army which he toured often throughout the Soviet Union and China from the 1950s until his retirement in 1976. It became a famous choir in that part of the world during the Cold War. The group often performed compositions by Uçi which included adaptations of Albanian folk songs and literature into classical choral compositions. He was particularly influential in writing cantatas in a uniquely Albanian style pioneering a genre known as the Albanian cantata. He also set to music poems by many prominent Albanian writers, including Naïm Frashëri, Andrea Varfi and Ismail Kadare, and sets texts with a nationalist, patriotic, or political nature in support of the Albanian government and the Soviet block.

== Death ==
Uçi died on 7 April 1982 in Tirana at the age of 59.
