= Pillow Lips =

Studio album by Modern English
- Released: 1990
- Genres: Rock; pop
- Length: 32:40
- Label: TVT
- Producer: Pat Collier

Modern English chronology
Stop Start (1986)	Pillow Lips (1990)	Everything's Mad (1996)

Pillow Lips is an album by the English band Modern English, released in 1990. It contains a rerecorded version of "I Melt with You", which charted. The album peaked at No. 135 on the Billboard 200. The band again broke up after promoting Pillow Lips.

== Production ==
The album was written over a period of 18 months, and was produced by Pat Collier. Modern English recorded it as a trio.

== Critical reception ==
Professional ratings
Review scores
Source	Rating
AllMusic	3/5 stars
Calgary Herald	B+
The Encyclopedia of Popular Music	2/5 stars
MusicHound Rock: The Essential Album Guide	2.5/5 stars
Ottawa Citizen	3/5 stars
The Rolling Stone Album Guide	2.5/5 stars

Entertainment Weekly wrote that "even the lightest, most eager and abandoned melodies on this album tap a deeper vein of feeling than most songs do." Trouser Press thought that "the diverse record contains some easy-to-like bounce-pop ('Beauty', 'Care About You') but other tracks either drift along listlessly (like the enervated title tune) or sag under clichéd lyrics ('Life's Rich Tapestry'...) and equally unimaginative melodies."

The Ottawa Citizen stated that, "now with the band trimmed back to a trio, the sound is tighter, the spirit more lively, and the approach better conceived." The Los Angeles Times concluded that the album was "recorded without a permanent lead guitarist in the group and suffers accordingly, with a thin, techno-pop approach somewhere between OMD and late-period Sparks." The Dallas Morning News determined that, "having provided us a near-perfect pop song, the group now delivers a hodgepodge that includes everything from neo-Modern English to country to watered-down Big Audio Dynamite."

AllMusic noted that "older fans of the band despaired of their new, slicker variant."

== Track listing ==
No.	Title	Length
1.	"I Melt with You"	4:15
2.	"Life's Rich Tapestry"	4:06
3.	"Beauty"	2:26
4.	"You're Too Much"	2:31
5.	"Beautiful People"	3:11
6.	"Care About You"	2:57
7.	"Let's All Dream"	2:37
8.	"Coming Up for Air"	3:46
9.	"Pillow Lips"	3:31
10.	"Take Me Away"	3:44
