= I Melt with You =

1982 single by Modern English

- Artwork for original 1982 release

Single by Modern English

from the album After the Snow
- B-side: "The Prize"; "After the Snow"; "Someone's Calling"
- Released: 9 August 1982
- Recorded: 1982
- Genre: New wave; post-punk
- Length: 3:50 (7-inch mix); 4:11 (album version)
- Label: 4AD; Sire
- Songwriters: Robbie Grey; Gary McDowell; Richard Brown; Michael Conroy; Stephen Walker
- Producer: Hugh Jones

Modern English singles chronology
"Life in the Gladhouse" (1982)	"I Melt with You" (1982)	"Someone's Calling" (1983)

Music video
- "I Melt with You" on YouTube

"I Melt with You" is a song by the British new wave band Modern English. The song was released in August 1982 by 4AD and Sire Records, as the second single from their second album, After the Snow (1982). It is produced by Hugh Jones and became the band's most successful single, largely in the United States, where it was featured in the film Valley Girl and on MTV. It reached number seven on the US Billboard Mainstream Rock chart in 1983. A re-release reached numbers 75 and 76 on the US Cash Box Top 100 and Billboard Hot 100 charts in 1990 (after reaching number 78 on the Hot 100 in 1983).

== Background ==
Modern English formed in 1979 in Colchester, Essex, England. The group signed with 4AD, a British independent record label, in 1980.

The band's vocalist, Robbie Grey, described England at the time of the song's writing to be a bleak place, due to an ongoing economic downturn: "There was no money. There'd be no power—you'd be at home with candles." These conditions and his fears of a nuclear war inspired "I Melt with You". The song depicts a couple making love while an atomic bomb is dropped. In an interview, he described the song as a "love song", but more about the "good and bad in people ... The last thing we wanted was to write a song where boy meets girl, they go to the cinema and make love, and that's the end of it."

Musically, the song came together in the band's rehearsal space in London while recording their second album, After the Snow. Producer Hugh Jones encouraged Grey to softly sing the vocal track, as opposed to his natural inclination to shout. He subsequently employed a softer vocal technique on the rest of the album.

== Commercial performance ==
The song was released in the United Kingdom in August 1982, by label 4AD. Although it failed to reach the UK singles chart, it became their fifth single to reach the UK Independent Singles Chart, peaking at number 18.

The song found most of its success in the United States, gaining attention over a long incubation period before becoming Modern English's and 4AD's first chart hit. It first began receiving radio airplay as an import single, and bounced from station to station, gaining momentum. In April 1983, the song peaked at number 7 on the US Billboard Mainstream Rock chart and number 78 on the main Billboard Hot 100. "I Melt with You" was particularly popular in dance clubs and on MTV, peaking at number 60 on Billboard's Dance/Disco Top 80 in March 1983. The single's success drastically altered the band's experience, according to Grey: "Someone picked up an import from England and started playing it on mainstream radio in America, and it just went like wildfire. We used to play to 200 people in art college; the next thing we knew, we were in Daytona Beach playing to 5,000 people who knew all the words [to the song]." Its popularity was bolstered by its inclusion in the 1983 film Valley Girl, where it is featured in the ending titles and in a "falling in love" montage sequence.

Modern English re-recorded the song for their 1990 album Pillow Lips. The song re-appeared on the Hot 100, peaking at number 76 in July, and re-appeared on the Dance charts, peaking at number 25 in August. The reformed original line up of the band re-recorded it again in 2010 in a completely reworked style for inclusion in the film I Melt with You.

The song is among the top 500 songs ever played on US radio. The group received a lifetime achievement award at the BMI Awards in 2017, celebrating 3 million plays of the song. It is ranked #39 on VH1's 100 Greatest Songs of the 80s. As Modern English's only major hit song, they are generally considered one-hit wonders, despite not reaching the top 40 of the U.S. Hot 100 during either of its runs on that chart. It was ranked #7 on VH1's 100 Greatest One Hit Wonders of the 80s.

== Reception ==
A reviewer for Billboard magazine commended the song as "classy", describing it as a "dreamy, acoustic-edged rocker." The re-recorded edition of the song for the band's 1990 album Pillow Lips was received negatively by the Los Angeles Times's Chris Willman, who dubbed it "nearly identical yet markedly inferior."

The song has remained popular over the years. Tom Demalon of AllMusic called it "one of the most enduring songs of the new wave era." Los Angeles Times contributor Sara Scriber wrote in 1997 that the song endured because it "struck a chord for its gothic, escapist undercurrent and danceable rhythm." In 2017, Chrissie Dickinson of the Chicago Tribune wrote that "with its irresistible guitar melody, danceable beat and heartfelt call and response vocals, it was a piece of work that fit snugly into the era."

== Charts ==
Chart (1983)	Peak position
US Billboard Hot 100	78
US Dance/Disco Top 80 (Billboard)	60
US Rock Albums & Top Tracks (Billboard)	7

Chart (1990)	Peak position
US Billboard Hot 100	76
US Hot Dance Music – Club Play	25
US Cash Box Top 100	75

== Certifications ==
Region	Certification	Certified units/sales
Canada (Music Canada)	Platinum	80,000^{‡}
United States (RIAA)	Gold	500,000^{‡}
^{‡} Sales+streaming figures based on certification alone.
