= Hands Across the Sea (song) =

Single by Modern English

from the album Ricochet Days
- Released: 1984
- Genre: New wave
- Length: 4:02
- Label: 4AD
- Songwriter(s): Modern English
- Producer(s): Hugh Jones

Modern English singles chronology
| "Chapter 12" (1984) | "Hands Across the Sea" (1984) | "Ink and Paper" (1986) |

"Hands Across the Sea" is a song by English new wave band Modern English. It was released as the second single from the band's third album Ricochet Days, and was produced by Hugh Jones. It reached No. 91 on the Billboard Hot 100 and No. 43 on the Billboard Rock chart.
