= Mesh & Lace =

Studio album by Modern English
- Released: 11 April 1981
- Recorded: 1980 Jacobs Studios, Farnham, England
- Genre: Post-punk; gothic rock
- Length: 42:25; 72:21 (with bonus tracks)
- Label: 4AD
- Producer: Modern English

Modern English chronology
Mesh & Lace (1981)	After the Snow (1982)

Mesh & Lace is the debut studio album by English post-punk band Modern English. It was released on 11 April 1981, through record label 4AD. The album was reissued on CD in 1992 with seven bonus tracks. On September 28, 2019, a digitally remastered edition of Mesh & Lace was released. It also contained bonus tracks and reimagined artwork from Vaughan Oliver, who designed the original Modern English album covers on 4AD.

Heavily inspired by Joy Division, the album is considered a pioneering work of the gothic rock and industrial genres.

== Critical reception ==
Professional ratings
Review scores
Source	Rating
AllMusic	3/5 stars
Sounds	4/5 stars

A press release for the 2019 remastered edition stated that the album "showed the band [Modern English] to be uncompromising experimentalists, leaving some to dismiss them as pretentious, but those who hung in there discovered a groundbreaking act, laying the foundation for such future musical movements as goth and industrial."

In a retrospective online review, Trouser Press panned the album, calling it "a load of monotonous droning and shouting by a precious art band oppressively weighed down by its self-conscious 4AD pretensions."

== Track listing ==
All tracks are written by Modern English.

Side A
No.	Title	Length
1.	"16 Days"	4:33
2.	"Just a Thought"	4:08
3.	"Move in Light"	4:45
4.	"Grief"	6:28

Side B
No.	Title	Length
1.	"The Token Man"	6:32
2.	"A Viable Commercial"	4:24
3.	"Black Houses"	5:44
4.	"Dance of Devotion (A Love Song)"	5:51

CD reissue
No.	Title	Length
1.	"Gathering Dust"	4:20
2.	"16 Days"	4:33
3.	"Just a Thought"	4:08
4.	"Move in Light"	4:45
5.	"Grief"	6:28
6.	"The Token Man"	6:32
7.	"A Viable Commercial"	4:24
8.	"Black Houses"	5:44
9.	"Dance of Devotion (A Love Song)"	5:51
10.	"Smiles and Laughter"	3:12
11.	"Mesh and Lace"	4:19
12.	"Tranquility of a Summer Moment (Vice Versa)"	7:02
13.	"Home"	3:50
14.	"Swans on Glass"	4:35
15.	"Incident"	2:38

== Personnel ==
- Robbie Grey – vocals, production
- Gary McDowell – guitar, vocals, production
- Mick Conroy – bass guitar, vocals, production
- Stephen Walker – keyboards, production
- Richard Brown – drums, production

Technical

- Ken Thomas – engineering
- Denis "BilBo" Blackham – mastering
- 23 Envelope – album cover design
