= Gary Barnacle discography =

This is the discography for English musician Gary Barnacle.

== Studio albums ==
=== As main performer ===
Year	Album
1994	Love Will Find a Way Additional information Released: 24 March 1994; Recorded: 1994; Genre: Electronic, smooth jazz, Downtempo; Labels: Victor Entertainment (VCP-5318); Formats: CD; Producer: Gary Barnacle; Track listing: 1. "Walking in the Rain"; 2. "Between the Lines"; 3. "Never Give Up on Your Love"; 4. "Latina"; 5. "I Wish"; 6. "Will You Be There?"; 7. "Paradise"; 8. "Spacewalk"; 9. "Crazy For Your Love"; 10. "Love Will Find a Way"; 11. "Cool Out"; 12. "Walking on Air"; Personnel: Steve Barnacle – drums, bass, keyboards, programming; Vee Jay – keyboards, guitar, bass, programming, vocals; Gary Barnacle – baritone, tenor, alto and soprano saxophone, bass, alto and concert flute, keyboards, programming, and arrangement; Dawn – vocals
1995	Phantom Horns Additional information Album by Phantom Horns; Re-released in 2011 in 2-CD-ROM format
2002	Paradise Additional information Album by Gary Barnacle

=== With Ruts D.C. ===
- Animal Now (May 1981: Virgin)
- Rhythm Collision (July 1982; Bohemian)

=== With Visage ===
- Beat Boy (September 1984; Polydor)

=== As writer, arranger, and/or performer ===
==== 1978 ====
- 1978 Alternative Routes by Tradition (Brass: Gary Barnacle/Luke Tunney) (album)
- 1978 ...Tell Your Friends About Dub by Tradition (Brass: Gary Barnacle/Luke Tunney) (album)
- 1978 Yankee Doodle Disco (40 All-American Greats) by Liberty Belle (Produced by Kris Ife; arranged by Dave Rowberry/Wilf Gibson; engineered by Phil Harding; sax/flute/piccolo by Gary Barnacle; trumpet by Luke Tunney; trombone by Annie Whitehead) (album)

==== 1979 ====
- 1979 The Secret by The Secret (album)
- 1979 The Crack by The Ruts (album)
- 1979 All Washed Up by Les McKeown (album)
- 1979 Bulky Backside by Blo (Horns by Gary Barnacle/Luke Tunney) (album)
- 1979 New York • London • Paris • Munich by M (album)

==== 1980 ====
- 1980 Captain Ganja and the Space Patrol by Tradition (Brass: Gary Barnacle/Luke Tunney) (album)
- 1980 Love Comes Love Goes by Sister Love (with Horns by Gary Barnacle/Luke Tunney) (album)
- 1980 Third World by Sonny Okosuns (Brass: Gary Barnacle/Luke Tunney) (album)
- 1980 Working on the Land by Jon Eden (Drums by Mark King; produced by Nick Launay)
- 1980 2nd Debut by The Sinceros (album)
- 1980 The Face of Love by Les McKeown's Ego Trip (album)
- 1980 Sanity Stomp by Kevin Coyne (album)
- 1980 Sandinista! by The Clash (album)
- 1980 Don't Follow Me, I'm Lost Too by Pearl Harbor (album)
- 1980 The Greatest by Leslie McKeown (album)
- 1980 The Official Secrets Act by M (album)
- 1980 Lovers Dub – The Original Dubtrack – A Dub Musical ! (Horns by Gary Barnacle – Alto Sax and Flute/Luke Tunney – Trumpet) (soundtrack album)
- 1980 It Slipped Right Through My Fingers by Pete Mitchell (with Tenor/Alto Saxes by Gary Barnacle)
- 1980 Minstrel by Pete Mitchell (Soprano Sax by Gary Barnacle)

==== 1981 ====
- 1981 Heart of Darkness by Positive Noise (album)
- 1981 Stray Cats by Stray Cats (album)
- 1981 Life by Broken Home (incl. "Rainbow Bridge"; saxophone by Gary Barnacle) (album)
- 1981 Grin & Bear It by The Ruts (album)
- 1981 In Trance as Mission by Simple Minds (Brass: Gary Barnacle/Martin Drover)
- 1981 "Black Snake Diamond Röle" by Robyn Hitchcock (album)
- 1981 Chez Moi by Valerie Lagrange (with The Ruts) (album)
- 1981 1984 by Rick Wakeman (album)
- 1981 Tonight by Lemmy Jackson (Brass: Gary Barnacle/Luke Tunney) (album)
- 1981 The Gospel of Ozziddi by Sonny Okosuns (Horns: Gary Barnacle/Luke Tunney) (album)
- 1981 I Want to Feel Your Love by Oby Onyioha (Horns by Gary Barnacle/Luke Tunney/Annie Whitehead) (album)
- 1981 Animal Now by The Ruts D.C. (album)
- 1981 Sons and Fascination by Simple Minds (album) (Brass: Gary Barnacle/Martin Drover) (uncredited)
- 1981 Kim Wilde by Kim Wilde (incl. "2-6-5-8-0" with Brass by Gary Barnacle/Luke Tunney) (album)
- 1981 Level 42 by Level 42 (album)

==== 1982 ====
- 1982 10, 9, 8, 7, 6, 5, 4, 3, 2, 1 by Midnight Oil (album) (Brass: Gary Barnacle / Peter Thoms / Luke Tunney)
- 1982 I Spy for the F.B.I. by Blue Rondo A La Turk (Baritone saxes: Gary Barnacle / Ronnie Ross)
- 1982 Reves Immoraux by Patrick Juvet (album)
- 1982 Femmes indiscrétion et blasphème by Julien Clerc (album)
- 1982 Oiseau Migrateur by Rachid Bahri (album)
- 1982 Mother & Child by Sonny Okosuns (Brass: Gary Barnacle / Luke Tunney) (album)
- 1982 Acting Very Strange by Mike Rutherford (album)
- 1982 Das Herz eines Boxers by Marius Müller-Westernhagen (album)
- 1982 Select by Kim Wilde (incl. "Action City" with Saxophones by Gary Barnacle) (album)
- 1982 The Hit List by Various (incl. "Love Cascade" by Leisure Process with Gary Barnacle on Sax and keyboards, and "Because You're Young" by Private Lives with Gary Barnacle on Sax)
- 1982 The Anvil by Visage (album)
- 1982 Famous Last Words by Robin Scott (album)
- 1982 Combat Rock by The Clash (incl. "Sean Flynn" with Tenor/Electric Saxophone and Flute by Gary Barnacle) (album)
- 1982 Rat Patrol from Fort Bragg (bootleg) by The Clash (album)
- 1982 Spirit of Ecstasy by Tradition (band) (Horns by Gary Barnacle – Sax / Luke Tunney – Trumpet) (album)

==== 1983 ====
- 1983 Catch as Catch Can by Kim Wilde (incl. "Love Blonde" with Brass by Gary Barnacle (Sax)/ Bill Barnacle (Tpt)/ Kenny Pyrke (Tbn) and "House of Salome" – Flute and saxophone solo by Gary Barnacle) (album)
- 1983 In Strict Tempo by David Ball (album)
- 1983 Private Dancer by Tina Turner (album)
- 1983 Drama of Exile by Nico (album)
- 1983 Dalek I Love You by Dalek I Love You (album)
- 1983 Jerky Versions of the Dream by Howard Devoto (album)
- 1983 You Broke My Heart in 17 Places by Tracey Ullman (Prod. Peter Collins) (incl. "I Close My Eyes and Count to Ten" feat. Brass: Gary Barnacle/Peter Thoms/Luke Tunney) (album)
- 1983 Building Beauty by Endgames (album)
- 1983 Secret by Classix Nouveaux (Produced by Alex Sadkin) (album)
- 1983 Vocabulary by The Europeans (album)
- 1983 C'est C Bon by Carlene Carter (Brass: Gary Barnacle/Luke Tunney/Annie Whitehead) (album)
- 1983 Working with Fire and Steel – Possible Pop Songs Volume Two by China Crisis (album)
- 1983 Pick Me Up by The Inspirational Choir of the Pentecostal First Born Church of the Living God
- 1983 Educating Rita (Original Motion Picture Soundtrack) by David Hentschel (album)

==== 1984 ====
- 1984 Beat Boy by Visage (album)
- 1984 This Is What You Want... This Is What You Get by Public Image Ltd (album)
- 1984 In the Long Grass by The Boomtown Rats (album)
- 1984 All the Rage by General Public (album)
- 1984 This Last Night in Sodom by Soft Cell (album)
- 1984 The Art of Tearing Apart (bootleg release from the Live Irony Tour 1984) by Soft Cell (album)
- 1984 True Colours by Level 42 (album)
- 1984 High Energy by Evelyn Thomas (Prod. Ian Levine) (album)
- 1984 Olympia by Hong Kong Syndikat (Prod. Rusty Egan) (album)
- 1984 Savoir Faire by Loredana Bertè
- 1984 Passion's in Fashion by The Thoughts (Produced by Clive Scott) (album)
- 1984 Run for Cover by Steve Grant (of Tight Fit; produced by Ian Levine) (album)
- 1984 Vermin in Ermine by Marc Almond and The Willing Sinners (album)
- 1984 In on the off Beat by Hey! Elastica (album)
- 1984 Influences by Mark King (album)
- 1984 Goodbye Cruel World by Elvis Costello & The Attractions (album)
- 1984 "Hold On" by Sense (Produced by David Ball (electronic musician)) (album)
- 1984 Untitled Instrumental by Bronski Beat (released on the 2025 Final Chapter rarities CD)

==== 1985 ====
- 1985 No Jacket Required by Phil Collins (album)
- 1985 Keep on Mooing by Steve Winwood (Prod. Langer/Winstanley)
- 1985 Phantasmagoria by The Damned (album)
- 1985 Easy Pieces by Lloyd Cole and the Commotions (album)
- 1985 Some People by Belouis Some (album)
- 1985 World Machine by Level 42 (album)
- 1985 The Dream Academy by The Dream Academy (Prod. David Gilmour) (album)
- 1985 Knights Like This by Peter Blegvad (album)
- 1985 Tears Don't Touch by Tom Morley
- 1985 Despite Straight Lines by Marilyn (album)
- 1985 Eloise Part 2 by The Perils of Plastic
- 1985 Cat's in the Bag by The Perils of Plastic
- 1985 Red Scarf by The Perils of Plastic
- 1985 Wait For Me by King Sunny Ade And The New African Beats (album)
- 1985 Don't Say It by Shezwae Powell
- 1985 Respect by Celena Duncan
- 1985 Because of Heaven by Celena Duncan
- 1985 Scream by Andy Cunningham (Prod. James Guthrie)
- 1985 Slow Song by Wet Wet Wet (Prod. John Ryan)
- 1985 Dreams Are Made of You by Richard King
- 1985 Mad Not Mad by Madness (album)

==== 1986 ====
- 1986 All You Need Is... by Love and Money (incl. "River Of People", "Dear John", "You're Beautiful" and "Temptation Time" – Produced by Tom Dowd and featuring Gary Barnacle on Saxophone) (album)
- 1986 Writing on the Wall by Bucks Fizz (album)
- 1986 Touch Me by Samantha Fox (incl. "Suzie, Don't Leave Me with Your Boyfriend" with Gary Barnacle (Saxophone), Luke Tunney (Trumpet), Peter Thoms (Trombone)) (album)
- 1986 Stop Start by Modern English (album)
- 1986 Charm by Intimate Strangers (album)
- 1986 Disco by Pet Shop Boys (album)
- 1986 Heaven and Sea by Pete Shelley (Track: "Never Again" – Produced by Stephen Hague – Baritone, Tenor and Alto Saxophones by Gary Barnacle) (album)
- 1986 Fruits of Passion by Fruits of Passion (album)
- 1986 Down to the Wire by Tom De Luca (album)
- 1986 Soul Love by Marti Jones
- 1986 Match Game by Marti Jones (album)
- 1986 Dancing in my Sleep by Dave Adams (album)
- 1986 No More the Fool by Elkie Brooks (album)
- 1986 The High Cost of Living by Chris Thompson (album)
- 1986 U-Vox by Ultravox (album)
- 1986 Strange Cruise by Strange Cruise Produced by Mike Hedges. (Brass section :- Gary Barnacle – Tenor/Baritone/Alto & Electric Saxes/Pete Thoms – Trombone/Luke Tunney – Trumpet) (album)
- 1986 Running Around with You by Andy Caine (Prod. Billy Livsey)
- 1986 Touch Sensitive by Andy Caine (Prod. Billy Livsey)
- 1986 Night of Lonely Tears by Tony Stone (Prod. Lloyd Phillipps)
- 1986 Long Way (Stephen Short mix) by Jana Pope
- 1986 Do You Mean It by The Belle Stars
- 1986 Black Stockings by Helena Springs (Produced by Bobby Eli)
- 1986 Talk Trash by Eddie Armani
- 1986 Now or Never by Sonny Okosuns (Horns: Gary Barnacle/Luke Tunney) (album)
- 1986 Anne Pigalle and The Models by Anne Pigalle
- 1986 Passé Le Rio Grande by Alain Bashung (album) (uncredited)
- 1986 Candy Train by Strangers and Brothers
- 1986 What Price Paradise by China Crisis (album)
- 1986 Broadcast by Cutting Crew (album)
- 1986 Chris Sutton by Chris Sutton (album)
- 1986 Silk and Steel by Five Star (album)
- 1986 Sooner or Later by Murray Head (album)
- 1986 Wonderland by Erasure (album)
- 1986 Into the Light by Chris de Burgh (album)
- 1986 Cut the Wire by David Knopfler (album) (uncredited)
- 1986 Big Canoe by Tim Finn (album)
- 1986 Press to Play by Paul McCartney (album)
- 1986 Desire for Freedom by Jim Diamond (album)
- 1986 Cool Jerk by Pete Townshend
- 1986 Barefootin' by Pete Townshend
- 1986 Mummy Calls by Mummy Calls (Prod. by Hugh Padgham)
- 1986 1st Down & Ten by Keep It Dark (album)
- 1986 Absolute Beginners: The Original Motion Picture Soundtrack by Various Artists (Arr. Gil Evans/David Bedford Prod. Clive Langer/Alan Winstanley) (album)
- 1986 Talking to a Wall by Franz Benton
- 1986 Baby Raven Mane by King (unreleased single released for the first time on the 2025 Soul on My Boots boxset)

==== 1987 ====
- 1987 12"ers by Phil Collins (album)
- 1987 El Momento by Nacha Pop (album)
- 1987 Sold by Boy George (album)
- 1987 Red by The Communards (album)
- 1987 Do Anything by Pete Shelley (Produced by Stephen Hague – Baritone/Tenor Saxophones by Gary Barnacle)
- 1987 "Black Snake Diamond Röle" by Robyn Hitchcock (re-issued on cd and adding bonus track "Dancing On God's Thumb" feat. Gary Barnacle on Tenor/Baritone Saxes) (album)
- 1987 Out of Our Idiot by Elvis Costello (album)
- 1987 Long Live the New Flesh by Flesh For Lulu (album)
- 1987 The Essential Art of Communication by Das Psycho Rangers
- 1987 Banzai Baby by Sandii & the Sunsetz (album)
- 1987 Whenever You Need Somebody by Rick Astley (album)
- 1987 Stan Campbell by Stan Campbell (album)
- 1987 Days Like This by Hindsight (album)
- 1987 Feelin' Good About It by This Way Up (album)
- 1987 In Time by View From The Hill (album)
- 1987 Hiding Out (soundtrack) (with Boy George) (album)
- 1987 Can't Wait to See the Movie by Roger Daltrey (album)
- 1987 Shove It by The Cross (album)
- 1987 Strongest by The Tallymen
- 1987 Two in England by Two in England (Prod. Dee Harris)
- 1987 I'm A Man by Bert Bevans (Prod. Steve Short)
- 1987 Takin' Me for a Ride by Dom Torsch
- 1987 Guilty by Outside Edge (Prod. Terry Brown)
- 1987 Samantha Fox by Samantha Fox (incl. "I Promise You (Get Ready)" with Saxophone/Electric Saxophone by Gary Barnacle) (album)
- 1987 Running in the Family by Level 42 (album)
- 1987 New Love by Helena Springs
- 1987 Joshin by Ann Lewis (album)
- 1987 Break Every Rule (Live/DVD) by Tina Turner
- 1987 Stand Up by Jo Lemaire (album)
- 1987 Talking in Your Sleep by Fat City
- 1987 Some Kind of Wonderful by Various (OST) (Track – "Do Anything" by Pete Shelley – Produced by Stephen Hague -Baritone/Tenor Saxophones by Gary Barnacle) (uncredited) (soundtrack album)
- 1987 Never Never Land by Simon F (album)
- 1987 Contract of Faith by Congress
- 1987 Everything Is Mine by Syndicate
- 1987 Crystal Eyes by John Eden
- 1987 Murderous People by Big River (Prod. Stephan Galfas)
- 1987 Desire by Toyah (album)
- 1987 Sinitta by Sinitta (album)
- 1987 The Hit Factory – The Best Of Stock Aitken Waterman (incl. Roadblock) (album)
- 1987 Love Your Face by Boom Boom Room (Prod. Steve Hillage)
- 1987 Midnight Lady by Helena Springs
- 1987 P.I. Private Investigations by Various (OST) (incl. 'River Of People' by Love And Money – Produced by Tom Dowd with Gary Barnacle – Saxes) (album)
- 1987 Play With Boys by Haywoode
- 1987 The Doors Are Open by Picnic at the Whitehouse (album)
- 1987 I'm a Survivor by Zuice (Prod. Lenny White) (album)
- 1987 Give It to Me One More Time by Eric Robinson
- 1987 Kiss of Life by State Of Play (Prod. Michael Kamen)
- 1987 Tell Me Straight by Twinset and the Pearl
- 1987 If by Hollywood Beyond (album)
- 1987 Turnaround (soundtrack)
- 1987 (Here Comes The) Little Ghost by Boy George (uncredited)
- 1987 It's Better to Travel by Swing Out Sister (album)
- 1987 The Prince's Trust Concert 1987 (as member of Phantom Horns) (album)

==== 1988 ====
- 1988 Working Girl (soundtrack)
- 1988 Say Goodbye by The Marines (Prod. Simon Burton/John Hudson)
- 1988 When I Dance with You by The Marines
- 1988 Need Your Love Tonight by Strength (Billy April/Vince Garcia) (Prod. Stuart Bruce)
- 1988 Fe Ciega (Blind Faith) by Ramoncin (album)
- 1988 Human Animal by Karel Fialka (album)
- 1988 Best in Me by Con Act
- 1988 To All the People by Strength (Billy April/Vince Garcia) (Prod. Stuart Bruce)
- 1988 Creeping Up on Jesus by The Big Dish (album)
- 1988 Dangerous Dreams by Well Well Well (incl. "Murderous People") (album)
- 1988 Desert Orchid by Crazyhead (as Phantom Horns) (album)
- 1988 No Winners by Paul Hardcastle (album)
- 1988 People by Hothouse Flowers (album)
- 1988 Bullet from a Gun by Derek B (album)
- 1988 Wanted by Yazz (album)
- 1988 Why Does Living Become Such a Crime by Tony Stone (Prod. Guy Chambers)
- 1988 Hold Me in Your Arms by Rick Astley (album)
- 1988 Real McCoy by The Silencers (album)
- 1988 The Jeremy Days by The Jeremy Days (album)
- 1988 Bleu by Gold (Prod. Trevor Vallis) (album)
- 1988 Mirror by One 2 One (album)
- 1988 Joy, Peace and Happiness by Strength (Billy April/Vince Garcia) (Prod. Stuart Bruce)
- 1988 Paradise Island by Amazulu (Prod. Hein Hoven)
- 1988 Monster Jam by Ambassadors of Funk (album)
- 1988 Man No More by The Senators (Prod. Jon Kelly)
- 1988 Union by Toni Childs (album)
- 1988 Sarah Jane Morris by Sarah Jane Morris (album)
- 1988 Rage by T'Pau (Brass section on "This Girl" by Gary Barnacle/John Thirkell/Simon Gardner/Peter Thoms) (album)
- 1988 Steppin' Out by Daryl Stuermer (album)
- 1988 No Outsiders by Judy Cheeks (album)
- 1988 24hrs by Scarlet Fantastic (album)
- 1988 Intervention by Lavine Hudson (album)
- 1988 Damn Your Eyes by Sylvia Griffin (Prod. Renate John)
- 1988 Blue and Gold by Bryn Haworth (album)
- 1988 Two Nations by Two Nations (Prod. David Steele/Andy Cox)

==== 1989 ====
- 1989 Moss Side Story by Barry Adamson (album)
- 1989 Boomerang by The Creatures (album)
- 1989 Blast by Holly Johnson ("Atomic City" and "Deep In Love" – Alto/Tenor/Baritone and Electric Saxophones by Gary Barnacle) (Producer – Dan Hartman) (album)
- 1989 Heart Like a Sky by Spandau Ballet (as member of Phantom Horns) (album)
- 1989 Here Today, Tomorrow Next Week! by The Sugarcubes (album)
- 1989 Bass! by Simon Harris (album)
- 1989 Love Like This by Cat (Prod. Tim Simenon)
- 1989 Paradise by Ruby Turner (album)
- 1989 Everything That I Need by Timecode
- 1989 Best Obsessions by Rex (album)
- 1989 Big Time Beat by 2 Brave
- 1989 Throw Your Love Away by Ice Cold in Alice (Prod. Graham Gouldman)
- 1989 Sharp Stone Rain by Vitamin Z (incl. Burning Flame with brass by Gary Barnacle (Saxophone)/Peter Thoms (Trombone)/Dave Plews (Trumpet)) (album)
- 1989 God Only Knows by State Of Mind
- 1989 Feeling More Than I Feel by Michael St. James
- 1989 Heavy Weather by Heavy Weather (Prod. Nick Tauber)
- 1989 Hole in My Heart by Richard Hagan
- 1989 I Wanna Be Wise by Vera Vitale
- 1989 Night Train by Kissing the Pink (Produced by Michael Kamen)
- 1989 Yeah (Alright) by Kissing the Pink (Produced by Michael Kamen)
- 1989 Blue Taboo by de Leiburne/MC Skimming (Prod. Ian Penman)
- 1989 Goodtime Girl by Dragon (Prod. Carey Taylor)
- 1989 Abbi Dubbi by Edoardo Bennato (album)
- 1989 Emotionspark by Grace Kairos (album)
- 1989 Licence to Kill soundtrack (Prod. Michael Kamen)
- 1989 Back for More by The Blues Band (album)
- 1989 Welcome to the Beautiful South by The Beautiful South (album)
- 1989 Hard Reyne by James Reyne (album)
- 1989 Bankstatement by Bankstatement (Tony Banks; The Phantom Horns) (album)
- 1989 Waterfront by Waterfront (album)
- 1989 It's You My Heart Beats For by Ruby Turner
- 1989 Catwoman by Cat (Prod. Tim Simenon) (album)
- 1989 Hollelujah (The Remix Album) (The Remix Album) by Holly Johnson ("Atomic City" (Enviro-Mental Mix) Baritone/Electric Tenor Saxophone by Gary Barnacle)

==== 1990 ====
- 1990 World of His Own by Jools Holland (album)
- 1990 Naked by Blue Pearl (album)
- 1990 UK Blak by Caron Wheeler (album)
- 1990 "Babylon Release the Chains" by Junior Reid
- 1990 Wop Bop Torledo by Wop Bop Torledo (album)
- 1990 "How the Heart Behaves" by Was (Not Was) (Louie Louie remix)
- 1990 Rose Laurens by Rose Laurens (Prod. David Richards)
- 1990 Love Is Not Enough by Joanna Law
- 1990 Love Will Bring Us Back Together (Louis Louis mix) by The Cookie Crew
- 1990 Trading Secrets with the Moon by The Adventures (album)
- 1990 "Werewolves of London" by Black Velvet Band (feat.Maria Doyle Kennedy)
- 1990 Disease and Desire by Soft Cell (album)
- 1990 Sound Syndicate by Paul Hardcastle (album)
- 1990 Who Loves You by Junior Reid
- 1990 Say Hello by Breathe (Louie Louie remix)
- 1990 Choke by The Beautiful South (album)
- 1990 A Pocketful of Dreams by Big Fun (album)
- 1990 "You've Got A Friend" by Big Fun and Sonia featuring Gary Barnacle (charity single)
- 1990 Dangerous by Andy Taylor (album)
- 1990 Exploitation Theme by Motherland
- 1990 Keep It Together by David Grant (Louie Louie remix)
- 1990 Circushead by The Jeremy Days (album)
- 1990 Espaldas Mojadas by Tam Tam Go ! (album)
- 1990 Melting Down on Motor Angel by Sunsonic (album)
- 1990 "Roll My Body" by Sunsonic (single)
- 1990 20 Great Golden Gobs by Spitting Image
- 1990 Running from the Guns by Die Laughing (album)
- 1990 Stand Strong by Junior Giscombe (album)
- 1990 "Ever Since that Day" by Associates (Louie Louie remix)
- 1990 December by Dag Kolsrud (album)
- 1990 "Down to You" by Blue Pearl
- 1990 Jordan: The Comeback by Prefab Sprout (as Phantom Horns) (album)
- 1990 "Maiden's Lament" by Jools Holland (as Phantom Horns)
- 1990 Foreign Affair by Tina Turner (album)

==== 1991 ====
- 1991 Guaranteed by Level 42 (album)
- 1991 Meanwhile by Camouflage (album)
- 1991 Changing Faces by Bros (album)
- 1991 Long Road by Junior Reid (album)
- 1991 Black Meaning Good by Rebel MC (album)
- 1991 Two Worlds by Motherland
- 1991 Beautiful One by Key West
- 1991 Man on the Run by Ramelle Henry (Prod. David Austin)
- 1991 Lui by Trinh (Prod. Desirée Mikhail)
- 1991 Decadence by Trinh (Prod. Desirée Mikhail)
- 1991 Doctor Love by Jeff Patterson
- 1991 That's Just the Way It Goes by Jeff Patterson
- 1991 Never See You Round Here by The Snakeskins
- 1991 Paper Doll (Flute Mix) by P.M. Dawn
- 1991 Best Thing by Lindy Layton (album)
- 1991 Work to Do by The Pasadenas (Prod. Louie Louie and The Pasadenas)
- 1991 Water Dragon by Masahiro Motoki (album)
- 1991 Marchand de cailloux by Renaud (album)
- 1991 Zeit Zu Leben by Klaus Hoffmann (album)
- 1991 America by Perales (album)
- 1991 I Believe by Old Tennis Shoes (Prod. Steve Glenn)
- 1991 Peace and Satisfaction by Joanna Law
- 1991 Hands of Time by Kazzing (Love Jones) (Prod. Simon Law)
- 1991 Chills by Kazzing (Love Jones) (Prod. Simon Law)
- 1991 Jalousie (Jealousy) soundtrack
- 1991 Let's Get to It by Kylie Minogue (album)
- 1991 Gorgeous by Rozlyne Clarke (album)
- 1991 Carrying A Torch by Tom Jones (album)
- 1991 Feel The Need by J T Taylor (of Kool and the Gang) (album)
- 1991 December II by Dag Kolsrud (album)
- 1991 Solitudes by Juvet (album)
- 1991 The Kissing Game by Respect (album)
- 1991 You Changed Me for the Better by Omar Chandler
- 1991 These Are the Facts of Life by Danny Madden (album)
- 1991 Skin I'm In by Kym Mazelle
- 1991 Kiss the Sky by Kiss the Sky (album)
- 1991 Stress by Daddy Freddy (Gary Barnacle credited as 'Guest Performer') (Track 13 – "The Crown" featuring Gary Barnacle on Flute/Alto Sax) (album)
- 1991 The Promise by T'Pau (album)
- 1991 Elevate by The Pasadenas (album)
- 1991 The Apple by A Man Called Adam (as Phantom Horns) (album)
- 1991 Rain Tree Crow by Rain Tree Crow (as Phantom Horns) (album)

==== 1992 ====
- 1992 Precious by Chante Moore (album)
- 1992 Intercourse by S'Express (album)
- 1992 Who's Got the Front by Angel C
- 1992 Wave of Love by Funmi
- 1992 Yours Sincerely by The Pasadenas (album)
- 1992 Guaranteed Live (VHS/DVD) by Level 42
- 1992 Fe Real by Maxi Priest
- 1992 Living Free by Olu
- 1992 I'll Live Forever by Jannicke
- 1992 Mind Adventures by Des'ree (album)
- 1992 The Jazzmasters by Paul Hardcastle (played on, and co-written) (album)
- 1992 And All You'll Say, You'll Do by Alison Evelyn (Prod. Louie Louie)
- 1992 Love Will Strike You Down by Aphrique
- 1992 Volume III: Just Right by Soul II Soul (album)
- 1992 I Can Move Ya by Angel C
- 1992 Spirit of Love by Angel C
- 1992 Hold Your Head Up High by Gwen Dickey
- 1992 Get in Touch with Yourself by Swing Out Sister (album)
- 1992 Warm Hatred by Distant Cousins (album)
- 1992 The Lobbyist by Johnny Diesel (album)
- 1992 Crackerjack by Flowered Up (album)
- 1992 King of Myself by Black Velvet Band (feat. Maria Doyle Kennedy) (album)
- 1992 Boing!! by Jefferson Airhead (album)
- 1992 Praise by Praise (album)
- 1992 Silent Way by Angie Giles (Simon Law remix)
- 1992 World of Wisdom by Jannicke
- 1992 Corazon Herido by Isabel Pantoja (album)
- 1992 Grass Roots by Takagi Kan (album)
- 1992 Music from the Heart by Jerry Huang (Prod. Leo Grant)
- 1992 Bashung by Alain Bashung (album) (uncredited)
- 1992 John Pagano by John Pagano (album)
- 1992 Fooled by Him by Perception
- 1992 A Love Like This by Sharon Benson
- 1992 Natural Thing by Closer Than Close
- 1992 You Got the Look by Closer Than Close
- 1992 You Got Me Now by Angel C
- 1992 Cynthia by Funmi
- 1992 Call Me Up by Aphrique
- 1992 Ain't No Substitute by Papa Dee (Prod. Peter Lorimer)
- 1992 Fireworks by Pele (album) (un-credited)
- 1992 Change Everything by Del Amitri (album) (uncredited)

==== 1993 ====
- 1993 Emergency on Planet Earth by Jamiroquai (album)
- 1993 Debut by Björk (album)
- 1993 Guru's Jazzmatazz, Vol. 1 by Guru (album)
- 1993 Drama of Exile – Version Originale by Nico (album on Buda Records)
- 1993 Come Undone (Simon Law Mix) by Duran Duran
- 1993 All About Eve (Sax N' Flute Mix) by Marxman
- 1993 Baby I'm Back by J T Taylor of (Kool and the Gang) (album)
- 1993 All of Me by Vertigo
- 1993 To Hell with Humdrum by Kingmaker (album)
- 1993 Good Morning Sinners by The Farm
- 1993 Digging This Hole by An Emotional Fish
- 1993 Happy Birthday by The Early Bert
- 1993 Through The Years by Cilla Black (album)
- 1993 Let Me Have a Dream by Soul Stirrings – the Nu Inspirational
- 1993 Sounds of the Loop by Gilbert O'Sullivan (album)
- 1993 The Business by Madness (incl. "Sweetest Girl" (Extended Version)) (album)
- 1993 Hey Little Girl (Pete Lorimer Mix) by Icehouse
- 1993 Jim Diamond by Jim Diamond (album)
- 1993 Gente Maravillosa by José Luis Perales (album)
- 1993 Sänger by Klaus Hoffmann (album)
- 1993 One and All by Supermax (album)
- 1993 Back to Love by Vertigo
- 1993 High Steppers by High Steppers
- 1993 What Is Life by Angel C
- 1993 Walking in the Sunshine by And How !
- 1993 Shooting Star in the Blue Sky by Taeko Onuki (album)
- 1993 Cancamay by Cancamay (album)
- 1993 Why by Angel C
- 1993 Waiting for the Truth by 2 Tribes (Prod. Pete Lorimer)
- 1993 Hepfidelity by Diesel
- 1993 A Feeling We Can Share by Vertigo
- 1993 Ska Beat Boogie by Steve Alpert
- 1993 The Definitive by Paul Hardcastle (album)
- 1993 Tears of Joy by Angel C
- 1993 Real Life by Jaki Graham (album)

==== 1994 ====
- 1994 A Love Supreme by Chante Moore (album)
- 1994 Shout It Out by Bizarre Inc
- 1994 As You Walk Away by Maxi Priest and Shaggy
- 1994 One on One by Yazz (album)
- 1994 Listen by Urban Species (album)
- 1994 Totally Wired 11 by Various (Acid Jazz) (album)
- 1994 When You Kill A Beautiful Thing/Still Winning/We Don't Want You Here/She Makes Me/Total Strangers/Lovers Look Out/
- 1994 Living on Dreams by Ramona 55
- 1994 The Circle by Motoharu Sano (album)
- 1994 Forever Surreal by Yosui Inoue (album)
- 1994 Latin Connection by Agora (album)
- 1994 Por Ti Mi Corazon by Francisco Xavier (album)
- 1994 El pan y la sal by Presuntos Implicados (album)
- 1994 Since Yesterday by Motoharu Sano
- 1994 Barth 1/2/3 by Art of Boys
- 1994 Bad Loser by Ramona 55
- 1994 Safe in the Arms by One Word
- 1994 Leave a Little Room by One Word
- 1994 You Can't Take It With You by Ramona 55
- 1994 How Can You Mend a Broken Heart? by Pedro Rojas
- 1994 Only Game in Town by Paul Young (remix by Adrian Bushby/Pete Davis)
- 1994 Carry On up the Charts by The Beautiful South (album)
- 1994 Love's Guaranteed by Mr.Fingers (Larry Heard)
- 1994 Conspiracy by Driza Bone (album)
- 1994 The Return of the Space Cowboy by Jamiroquai (album) (uncredited) (Horns on "The Kids" – Gary Barnacle/John Thirkell/Richard Edwards)
- 1994 Clever Girl by Samuel Purdey
- 1994 Forever Now by Level 42 (album)

==== 1995 ====
- 1995 Post by Björk (album)
- 1995 New Skin by Siouxsie and the Banshees (Brass: Gary Barnacle/Peter Thoms/John Thirkell/Luke Tunney)
- 1995 Goodbye Cruel World (Ryko Bonus Tracks) by Elvis Costello (album)
- 1995 Hold On by Jaki Graham (album)
- 1995 Renegade by Cheryl Lynn
- 1995 Dreamtime by Zee (Prod. Boy George for More Protein Records)
- 1995 Given You All by Kenny Thomas (Prod. Simon Law)
- 1995 Can You Feel the Light by Rebekah Ryan
- 1995 Nothing Less than Brilliant 1964–1995 by Sandie Shaw (incl. "Frederick" and "Are You Ready to Be Heartbroken?") (album)
- 1995 The Love I Lost by West End
- 1995 The Tooth Mother by Mick Karn (album)
- 1995 Volume V: Believe by Soul II Soul (album)
- 1995 Love and Respect by Marla Glen (album)
- 1995 Londonbeat by Londonbeat (album)
- 1995 A Maximum High by Shed Seven (as the Phantom Horns Gary Barnacle/John Thirkell) (album)
- 1995 Tears by Watauchi Katsuyuki (Horns by Gary Barnacle/Peter Thoms/Stuart Brooks) (album)
- 1995 Forms – Remix For Ordinary People by Soft Ballet (Prod. Ryoji Oba) (album)
- 1995 Mirror Mirror by 10cc (album)
- 1995 Deadline for My Memories by Billie Ray Martin (as Phantom Horns) (album)
- 1995 Things Change by Charlie Dore (album)
- 1995 Don't Lose the Magic by West End
- 1995 Showgirls (soundtrack) (feat. New Skin by Siouxsie and the Banshees) (Horns: Gary Barnacle/Peter Thoms/John Thirkell/Luke Tunney) (album)

==== 1996 ====
- 1996 Travelling Without Moving by Jamiroquai (Horns: Gary Barnacle/John Thirkell) (Note – actual credit for the horns on the album sleeve, as follows: A big thank you to Johnny Thirkle and Gary Barnacle of the Co. Durham Miners Coalition Brass Band) (album)
- 1996 Don't Stop by Status Quo (album)
- 1996 Too-Rye-Ay by Dexy's Midnight Runners (Re-issue incl. "T.S.O.P." with horns by Gary Barnacle/'Big' Jim Paterson)
- 1996 Surprise by Bizarre Inc (album)
- 1996 That Perfect Feeling by Double 2
- 1996 White Label Vol. 3 – Progressive Metamorphic Techno by Various (incl. the tracks Emul-8 and That Perfect Feeling) (album)
- 1996 Do You Wanna Go Back (To When) by Nu Colours
- 1996 Land of the Living by Kristine W (incl. Jazzin with brass by Gary Barnacle (Saxophone)/Dave Plews (Trumpet)) (album)
- 1996 Emul-8 by Trance Research
- 1996 Egoist by Tomoki Hirata (album)
- 1996 From This Moment On by West End
- 1996 Secret Combination by Steve McCauley (Brass section: Gary Barnacle/Peter Thoms/Stuart Brooks) (Producer – Peter Oxendale)
- 1996 Sputnik: The Next Generation by Sputnik: The Next Generation featuring Hotei (Prod. Neal X) (album)
- 1996 Beat the Clock by Sparks (Prod. Bernard Butler)
- 1996 You And I (Keep Holding On) by Billie Ray Martin (as Phantom Horns)
- 1996 Forever Now (with bonus tracks) by Level 42 (album)
- 1996 Telegram by Björk (album)

==== 1997 ====
- 1997 One Night of Sin by Marc Almond (Prod. Neal X)
- 1997 Phenomenon by Tony Ferrino (album)
- 1997 Games by Happy Clappers (album)
- 1997 Try by Innercolors
- 1997 Souled Live by Vivienne McKone (album)
- 1997 The Natural Life by Yazz (album)
- 1997 Feedback by Vargas Blues Band (album)
- 1997 Lullaby by Slava
- 1997 Bridge Over Troubled Water by Truce
- 1997 Foxy Lady by Disco Hospital
- 1997 One Day at a Time by Symposium (album)
- 1997 Rising Heat by Ruff Neck Trilogy
- 1997 The Pain by Ruff Neck Trilogy
- 1997 Before the Rain by Eternal (album) (Horns: Gary Barnacle/Stuart Brooks/Andy Rogers)
- 1997 Total Madness - The Very Best of Madness by Madness (album)
- 1997 Ice Cream by Ambakalla Featuring Coalishun
- 1997 One Track Mind by Soda
- 1997 Still a Thrill by Sybil Lynch (album)

==== 1998 ====
- 1998 Let It All Change by Lighthouse Family (album)
- 1998 Hatful of Rain by Del Amitri (album)
- 1998 Mojo (soundtrack)
- 1998 Starsky and Hutch Theme by Andy G's All Stars and Huggy Bear
- 1998 Ultimate by S'Express (album)
- 1998 Get in the Swing by Inner Swing (album)
- 1998 Far East by Hajime Mizoguchi (album)
- 1998 Avenidas by Rui Veloso (album)
- 1998 Change Your Thoughts, You Change Your Life by Geno Washington (album)
- 1998 Jimmy Ray by Jimmy Ray (album)
- 1998 One Man by Mark King (album)

==== 1999 ====
- 1999 Outra Vez by Joao Pedro Pais (incl. songs Perdido and Corri) (album)
- 1999 When the Good Times Come by Hard Rain (album)
- 1999 Cheap Pearls and Whisky Dreams by Love and Money (album)
- 1999 The Lot by Madness (6 CDs – incl 'Mad Not Mad' album with bonus tracks)
- 1999 Torvil and Dean (soundtrack album) (album)
- 1999 Empire State (with Gary Barnacle – Flutes/Tom Cawley/Matt Clackett)
- 1999 Free at Last (Prod. Gary Miller)
- 1999 Portrait by Celtus (album)

==== 2000 ====
- 2000 True Colours/World Machine by Level 42 (album)
- 2000 More Edge by Outside Edge (Prod. Terry Brown) (album)
- 2000 Bite Black+Blues by Raoul and the Ruined (Marc Almond) (with bonus live tracks) (album)
- 2000 Life by Broken Home (with 3 bonus tracks) (album)
- 2000 Canterbury Tales by Various. (incl. As Long As He Lies Perfectly Still by Soft Machine (Written by Mike Ratledge & Robert Wyatt) (with Clive Brooks – Drums. Hugh Hopper – Bass Guitar. Jakko Jakszyk – Vocals, Guitar, arranger, Producer. Dave Stewart (musician, born 1950) – Grand piano, Organ, Keyboards, arranger, Producer. Gary Barnacle – Flutes/Saxes and engineer for the recording of the band @ 241 Studios, London. (album)
- 2000 Level 42 (incl. bonus track "Foundation & Empire" with saxophone solo by Gary Barnacle) by Level 42 (album)
- 2000 Brit Horns by Brit Horns

==== 2001 ====
- 2001 Out There by Cathi Ogden (album)
- 2001 Shann Lee Parker Band (6 track mini-album incl. Home To America with Sax by Gary Barnacle) (album)
- 2001 As Long As He Lies Perfectly Still by Soft Machine (Written by Mike Ratledge and Robert Wyatt) (with Clive Brooks – drums. Hugh Hopper – Bass Guitar. Jakko Jakszyk – Vocals/Guitar, arranger, Producer. Dave Stewart (musician, born 1950) – Grand piano, Organ, Keyboards, arranger, Producer. Gary Barnacle – Flutes/Saxes and engineer for recording of band @ 241 Studios, London).
- 2001 Guaranteed/Forever Now by Level 42 (album)
- 2001 Please (Suburbia – The Full Horror) by Pet Shop Boys (album)
- 2001 Angel by Hajime Mizoguchi (album)
- 2001 Bustin' Out [incl. Denial (un-issued)] by The Ruts (album)

==== 2002 ====
- 2002 Wake by Sheila Nicholls (album)
- 2002 That's My Beat by Mantronix
- 2002 Phrenology by The Roots (the track "Quills" contains a sample of the song "Breakout" by Swing Out Sister – brass section: Gary Barnacle/Peter Thoms/John Thirkell/Luke Tunney)
- 2002 Stop It, I Like It by Rick Guard (Brass: Gary Barnacle/Peter Thoms/Stuart Brooks) (Prod. Midge Ure)
- 2002 Sélection Talents by Gold (band)
- 2002 Les Hauts De Bashung by Alain Bashung (album)
- 2002 Different Sounds: The Remixes by Jamiroquai (album)
- 2002 Spirits Rising by Teena Lyle
- 2002 I'm in Love/Precious Gift by Dorothy Umukoro
- 2002 I'd Like to Teach the World to Sing by New World

==== 2003 ====
- 2003 Piano Foreplay by Gilbert O'Sullivan (Tenor Sax on What's It All Supposed To Mean ? by Gary Barnacle) (uncredited) (album)
- 2003 La Lumière De L'Or by Gold (band) (album) (3 cds)
- 2003 The Crack/Grin & Bear It by The Ruts (with bonus tracks) (album)
- 2003 3 Originals by Rick Astley (album)
- 2003 Peaches (with Matt Johnson/Rasmus)
- 2003 Park and Ride (Sundown Park) by Marcus Shelton (album)

==== 2004 ====
- 2004 Between the Sun and the Moon by Brenda Russell (album)
- 2004 Smooth Cuts by Paul Hardcastle/Jazzmasters
- 2004 Legends by Londonbeat (album)
- 2004 Goodbye Cruel World (Rhino Bonus Disc) by Elvis Costello (album)
- 2004 Life by Broken Home (with 11 bonus tracks) (album)
- 2004 Beach Party by Jive Bunny and the Mixmasters (album)
- 2004 History – Pop Muzik – The 25th Anniversary by M (album)
- 2004 El Momento by Nacha Pop (album)

==== 2005 ====
- 2005 Keep On Rockin' by Status Quo
- 2005 A Espuma Das Cancoes by Rui Veloso (album)
- 2005 Gold by Stock, Aitken and Waterman (3 cd) (incl. Roadblock – Rare Groove Mix)
- 2005 Zoom by Jazz Junkie (Matt Johnson of Jamiroquai)
- 2005 The Constant Fight with Contentment by Marcus Shelton (album)
- 2005 Last Minute Decisions by No Pressure (album)
- 2005 The Bumpy Road to Love by Virginia Constantine (album)
- 2005 People (Bonus tracks) by Hothouse Flowers (album)
- 2005 In the Long Grass (with bonus tracks) by The Boomtown Rats (album)
- 2005 The City Streets by Positive Flow (album)
- 2005 Grin & Bear It by The Ruts (with bonus tracks) (album)

==== 2006 ====
- 2006 Hello Miss Lovely by Little Man Tate
- 2006 Gold by The Beautiful South (album)
- 2006 Surrounded by Björk (album)
- 2006 You Got What You Asked For by The Red Stripe Band (album)
- 2006 Defected in the House by Eivissa 06
- 2006 The Bruised Romantic Glee Club by Jakko Jakszyk (album)
- 2006 Don't Stop by Status Quo (with bonus tracks)

==== 2007 ====
- 2007 Lucky Me by Robert Bowden (Prod. Mike Hedges)
- 2007 Mad Bad World by Robert Bowden (Prod. Mike Hedges)
- 2007 Guaranteed by Level 42 (2 CDs with bonus tracks) (album)
- 2007 New York, London. Paris. Munich by M (with bonus tracks) (album)
- 2007 J C Bentley (Prod. Matt Johnson (Jamiroquai))
- 2007 Love Life by Tara Norveil (album)
- 2007 Samba by Tom Linden

==== 2008 ====
- 2008 Rowing Against the Tide by Propeller (album)
- 2008 Out of the Blue by Ray Guntrip and Tina May (album)
- 2008 Hurt by Patsy Peters (Vocals – engineered/arranged and tracks produced, mixed and mastered plus keyboards played, by Gary Barnacle at 241 Studios) (album)
- 2008 Bijoux Bijoux by Alain Bashung (album)
- 2008 World Machine by Level 42 (2 CDs with bonus tracks) (album)
- 2008 The Drifters (Prod. Sean/PMG Ltd)
- 2008 Despite Straight Lines – The Very Best Of Marilyn by Marilyn (album)
- 2008 I Could Never Be Your Woman soundtrack
- 2008 Bestial Cluster/The Tooth Mother by Mick Karn (album)

==== 2009 ====
- 2009 Waves Sweep the Sand by Jakko M. Jakszyk (album)
- 2009 Select (incl. Action City – Saxophones by Gary Barnacle and bonus track Child Come Away – Sax solo by Gary Barnacle ) by Kim Wilde (album)
- 2009 Phantasmagoria (Bonus cd) (Bonus tracks) by The Damned (album)
- 2009 À Perte De Vue by Alain Bashung (album)
- 2009 Sound Of Summer by Paul Hardcastle
- 2009 After Dark by Ray Guntrip Band with Shanelle (album)
- 2009 A Long Way Back by Roger Cotton (album)
- 2009 Beat Boy (incl. bonus track "She's a Machine") by Visage (album)
- 2009 Catch as Catch Can by Kim Wilde (incl. Love Blonde album mix, Love Blonde 7 mix and Love Blonde 12 mix – all 3 versions with Gary Barnacle (Saxophone)/ Bill Barnacle (Trumpet)/ Kenny Perk (Trombone)) (album)
- 2009 Forever Now by Level 42 (2 CDs with bonus tracks) (album)

==== 2010 ====
- 2010 Bona Drag by Morrissey (incl. "Oh Phoney" feat. Gary Barnacle on Piano, Flute, Recorder and Baritone Sax and produced by Clive Langer/Alan Winstanley (album)
- 2010 Silk and Steel (incl. remix of "Rain or Shine") by Five Star (album)
- 2010 A Pocketful of Dreams (featuring bonus track "You've Got A Friend") by Big Fun (album)
- 2010 Chroma with Debbi Parks/Lisa Davies
- 2010 Blast (album) by Holly Johnson(Deluxe Edition) (2 CDs + DVD) ("Atomic City" (Album Mix and Bona Biodegradable Mix) Baritone/Electric Tenor Saxophone by Gary Barnacle) (album)
- 2010 Licks Edition – Refill by Brit Horns
- 2010 Carried by the Storm by Bronz (album)
- 2010 Pet Rock/2nd Debut by The Sinceros (with bonus tracks)
- 2010 Mad Not Mad (Deluxe Edition) (2 CDs + DVD) (incl. "Uncle Sam" (Ray Gun Mix), "Sweetest Girl" (Extended Mix), "Sweetest Girl" (Dub Mix) with Saxophones by Gary Barnacle) (album)
- 2010 Impossible Oddities... by The Orb and Youth (album)
- 2010 Animal Now by Ruts DC (Includes 2 bonus tracks) (album)
- 2010 Tearing Apart by Soft Cell (album)
- 2010 Living It Up by Level 42 (feat. Phantom Horns live on Love Meeting Love/Kansas City Milkman and The Antwerp Medley) (album)

==== 2011 ====
- 2011 Dreams That Money Can't Buy by Holly Johnson (Deluxe Edition) (2 CDs + DVD) ("Atomic City" (Enviro-Mental Instrumental) – Baritone/Electric Tenor Saxophone by Gary Barnacle) (uncredited) (album)
- 2011 Desire by Paul Hardcastle (album)
- 2011 Funk, Fast Times & Nigerian Boogie Badness by Brand New Wayo (album)
- 2011 So Good by Mica Paris (The Deluxe Edition) (2 CDs) (incl. "Rock Together" – Alto Sax by Gary Barnacle) (album)
- 2011 This Is Love by Yazz (album)
- 2011 Ibiza Annual 2011 (Ministry Of Sound) by Various (incl. The Trumpeter by Ray Foxx) (album)

==== 2012 ====
- 2012 Touch Me by Samantha Fox (2-CD deluxe edition with extra tracks) (album)
- 2012 Writing on the Wall by Bucks Fizz (2-CD Deluxe Edition – Extra Tracks) (album)
- 2012 Human Racing by Nik Kershaw (2-CD Deluxe Edition – Extra Tracks) (album)
- 2012 Ultimate Crisis by China Crisis (2 CDs)
- 2012 Samantha Fox by Samantha Fox (2-CD Deluxe Edition – Extra Tracks) (album)
- 2012 Berwick Rendezvous by Mike Collins/Aurora Colson (incl. "Chez Les Yé-Yé" with Saxes by Gary Barnacle)
- 2012 It's Better to Travel by Swing Out Sister (2-CD Expanded Edition) (incl. 3 remixes of "Breakout") featuring Brass: Gary Barnacle/John Thirkell/Peter Thoms/Luke Tunney) (album)
- 2012 Where You Belong by Ray Guntrip and Tina May (album)
- 2012 Everything Is Gonna Be Alright by Vivienne McKone
- 2012 Gagarin Sang a Hymn in Space by Vlad Miller and Notes from Underground (album)
- 2012 The Annual 2012 (Ministry Of Sound) by Various (incl. La Musica by Ray Foxx) (album)
- 2012 Whole World at Our Feet (film soundtrack) by Motor-Roller (Flute/Soprano Sax by Gary Barnacle)
- 2012 The Quick and the Dead by The Geoff Everett Band (featuring Mollie Marriott, Albert Lee, Dave Swarbrick, Tim Hinkley and Alan Glen, among others) (album)

==== 2013 ====
- 2013 Jank by The JACS (with Gary Barnacle/David Smith on Saxes) (album)
- 2013 Love Letters by Brenna Whitaker (Prod. Walter Afanasieff) (with the Blackjack Horns) (album)
- 2013 Emergency on Planet Earth by Jamiroquai (2-CD Deluxe Edition with extra tracks – incl. "God Make Me Funky" Live @ Glastonbury, 1993 feat. Gary Barnacle on Saxophone) (album)
- 2013 The Return of the Space Cowboy by Jamiroquai (2-CD Deluxe Edition with extra tracks – incl. Space Clav feat. Gary Barnacle on Flutes and as co-writer, along with Toby Smith & Stuart Zender) (album)
- 2013 Travelling Without Moving by Jamiroquai (2 CD Deluxe Edition with extra tracks – incl. Slipin' N' Slidin' feat. Gary Barnacle – Saxes/John Thirkell – Trumpet) (album)

==== 2014 ====
- 2014 Mue by Emilie Simon (with the Blackjack Horns) (album)
- 2014 Love Beyond – The Musical by Love Beyond (Original Cast Recording) (with the Blackjack Horns – feat. Nik Carter – Baritone Sax and Sax solo/ Jack Birchwood – Trumpet/ Mat Walton – Trombone and Gary Barnacle – Tenor Sax) (album)

==== 2015 ====
- 2015 Reverie by Sheila Waterfield (album)
- 2015 Fair Weather Friend by Coot (album)
- 2015 Add To Favourites by Cutting Crew (Feat. the Blackjack Horns – Nik Carter/Gary Barnacle – Saxes/ Jack Birchwood – Trumpet and Steven Fuller – Trombone) (album)
- 2015 Bridge Of Spies by T'Pau (band) (2 CD Remastered Expanded Edition) (incl. China in Your Hand single version and the official video for this version :- both featuring Gary Barnacle – Alto Saxophone) (album)

==== 2016 ====
- 2016 No More A Secret by Robin Bibi (Horns arranged and played by the Blackjack Horns :- Nik Carter/Gary Barnacle – Saxes/ Jack Birchwood – Trumpet) (album)
- 2016 Laid-Back Beats – by Various (incl. "The Ace" – composed by Simon Alban Law/Ruinz Ason/Jennifer Dawn Schaffer/"Deep In It" – composed by Simon Alban Law/Ruinz Ason/"Be You" – composed by Simon Alban Law/Ruinz Ason/"My Destiny" – composed by Simon Alban Law/Ruinz Ason. Performed by Simon Law and Ruinz Ason – with Saxes by Gary Barnacle) (digital download album on Music House Int./EMI Production Music)

==== 2017 ====
- 2017 Decades by David Palfreyman and Nicholas Pegg (Engineered and co-produced by Ian Caple) (Horns on Love You Til Burn Out arranged by Gary Barnacle and played by the Blackjack Horns :- Jack Birchwood – Trumpet/ Gary Barnacle – Saxes) (album)
- 2017 Look to the Sky by Simon Law (Horns on Fire On Fire by the Blackjack Horns :- Nik Carter/Gary Barnacle – Saxes/ Jack Birchwood – Trumpet/Trombone) (album)

==== 2018 ====
- 2018 Night Patrol by Geoff Everett (album)
- 2018 Look to the Sky (NK-OK and Blue Lab Beats Remix) by Simon Law feat. Jazzie B and Lain Gray – with Gary Barnacle on Tenor/Alto Saxes (which were engineered and played by G.B. @ 241 Studios UK).

==== 2019 ====
- 2019 Welcome to the Remix Vol.2 presented by Rusty Egan (incl. "Do What You Wanna Do" by The Cage featuring Nona Hendryx (with Gary Barnacle on Saxophone/Keyboards) and "I Thought That I Could Never Love Again" featuring Erik Stein (with Gary Barnacle on Alto Saxophone) (album)

==== 2023 ====
- 2023 The Brutal by Spare Snare

== Live albums ==
- 1980 100% Live (At The Budokan) by Les McKeown (album)
- 1984 Bite Black+Blues by Raoul and The Ruined (Marc and the Mambas live) (album)
- 1987 The Prince's Trust Concert 1987 by various artists (album)
- 1988 Tina Live in Europe by Tina Turner (album)
- 1988 Second Coming: Liverpool '88 by Deaf School (album)
- 1990 Al Limite, Vivo Y Salvaje (Live and Wild) by Ramoncin (live album) (2 cd)
- 1993 BBC In Concert 582 by Jamiroquai (TCD 0677) (album)
- 1997 Souled Live by Vivienne Mckone (album)
- 1999 Prince's Trust Rock Gala: Volume 3 by various artists (album)
- 2019 Say Hello Wave Goodbye by Soft Cell (with Gary Barnacle – Woodwind and Jack Birchwood – Trumpet)

== Compilations, remixes and box sets ==
1980s

- 1985 The Best of Elvis Costello and The Attractions by Elvis Costello (album)
- 1986 Disco by Pet Shop Boys
- 1986 Utter Madness by Madness (incl. "Uncle Sam" and "Sweetest Girl") (album)
- 1987 Out of Our Idiot (on track "Imperial Bedroom") by Elvis Costello & The Attractions
- 1987 The Family Edition by Level 42
- 1987 Maxi Power: Best from Miami by various artists
- 1988 The Story of the Clash, Volume 1 by The Clash (2 cd)
- 1988 The Best of Eurodisco Vol 2 (feat. remixes of "Whatever Makes Our Love Grow" and "Roadblock") by various artists
- 1988 The Hit Factory Featuring Stock Aitken Waterman (incl. "Roadblock" and "Whatever Makes Our Love Grow") (album)

1990s

- 1990 China Crisis Collection: The Very Best of China Crisis by China Crisis
- 1991 Simply the Best by Tina Turner
- 1991 The Collection by Nik Kershaw
- 1991 The Singles by The Clash
- 1991 Simply the Best by Tina Turner (album)
- 1992 Greatest Hits by Kylie Minogue
- 1992 Divine Madness by Madness (album)
- 1993 Super Black Market Clash by The Clash (album)
- 1993 Heart and Soul - The Very Best of T'Pau by T'Pau (incl. saxophone on "China in Your Hand"/"Road to Our Dream"/"This Girl") (album)
- 1994 Dorado: The Gold Sessions by Dorado (album)
- 1994 Mis 30 Mejores Canciones by José Luis Perales (album)
- 1994 L'Intégrale Des Maxi-Singles by Jamiroquai (French 5-CD box set) (Horns by Gary Barnacle/John Thirkell/Richard Edwards)
- 1994 The Collected Recordings – Sixties to Nineties by Tina Turner (album)
- 1995 The Originals by Kim Wilde (album)
- 1996 Telegram by Björk
- 1996 White Label Vol. 3: Progressive Metamorphic Techno by various artists
- 1996 Greatest Hits by Jamiroquai
- 1996 Exploring the Frontiers of Rock, Jazz and World Music by The CMP Collection
- 1996 Greatest Hits by Daddy Freddy Track 13. "The Crown" (David Morales Radio Mix) – Flute by Gary Barnacle (uncredited) (album)
- 1996 Over the Years: A Collection by Sonny Okosuns (Brass section: Gary Barnacle/Luke Tunney) (album)
- 1997 White Label Collection by various artists
- 1997 A Bestiary Of by The Creatures (album)
- 1997 20,000 Watt R.S.L. by Midnight Oil ("Power and the Passion" Brass: Gary Barnacle/Peter Thoms/Luke Tunney) (album)
- 1997 Cover to Cover by Paul Hardcastle (2 cd) (album)
- 1997 The Greatest Hits by T'Pau (album)
- 1997 Greatest Hits by Eternal (album)
- 1998 Greatest Hits by Nik Kershaw
- 1998 Heaven – The Very Best Of Pauline Henry and The Chimes Track 4. "True Love" (Single Version) with additional overdubs by Louie Louie and Flute by Gary Barnacle (uncredited) (album)
- 1998 The Heavy Heavy Hits by Madness (incl. "Sweetest Girl" and "Uncle Sam") (album)
- 1998 Neon: 15 Great Movie Tracks (album)
- 1999 The Twelve Inch Singles by Soft Cell
- 1999 The Very Best of Elvis Costello by Elvis Costello
- 1999 Going for Gold by Shed Seven (album)

2000s

- 2000 Toni Childs: Ultimate Collection by Toni Childs
- 2000 Canterbury Tales by various artists
- 2000 At His Very Best by Engelbert Humperdinck (incl. saxophone on "Strangers in the Night"/"Nothing in this World" by Gary Barnacle and "Dance the Night Away" featuring horns by Gary Barnacle/Peter Thoms/Stuart Brooks) (album)
- 2000 Collection by The Clash (album)
- 2000 Ultimate Collection by Sonny Okosun (Brass: Gary Barnacle/Luke Tunney) (album)
- 2000 The Greatest Hits by The Jazzmasters (album)
- 2001 Man in a Deaf Corner: Anthology 1963–1970 by Soft Machine
- 2001 The Best of Vargas Blues Band by Vargas Blues Band
- 2001 Solid Bronze by The Beautiful South (album)
- 2001 Phases 1972–1982 by Blo (Horns by Gary Barnacle/Luke Tunney) (album)
- 2001 The Best of Vargas Blues Band by Vargas Blues Band (album)
- 2001 The Collection by Mammoth
- 2002 Camphor by David Sylvian (album)
- 2002 The Complete Odyssey by Jamiroquai (5 CDs – incl. Emergency on Planet Earth, The Return of the Space Cowboy, Travelling Without Moving)
- 2002 Mes Plus Grands Succès – Les Refrains De Ma Vie by Petula Clark (2 cd)
- 2002 Partition 1979–2002 by Julien Clerc (3 cd)
- 2002 Greatest Hits by Lighthouse Family (album)
- 2003 Greatest Hits 87–97 by Kylie Minogue
- 2003 PopArt: Pet Shop Boys – The Hits by Pet Shop Boys
- 2003 Singles, Volume 2 by Elvis Costello
- 2003 Singles, Volume 3 by Elvis Costello
- 2003 In Session: Vol. 1 by Marc Almond (Brass: Gary Barnacle/Enrico Tomasso) (album)
- 2003 Femme Fatale: The Aura Anthology by Nico (2 cd)
- 2003 The Very Best of Paul Hardcastle 1983–2003 by Paul Hardcastle (2 cd) (album)
- 2003 The Ultimate Collection by Swing Out Sister (Incl. 2 remixes of "Breakout" – Brass Section: Gary Barnacle/John Thirkell/Peter Thoms/Luke Tunney) (3 cd)
- 2003 The Very Best Of by Paul Hardcastle
- 2004 Themes from S'Express by S'Express (album)
- 2004 The Platinum Collection by Phil Collins (album)
- 2004 The Best of Bros by Bros (album)
- 2004 All the Best by Tina Turner (album)
- 2004 The Berry Vest of Gilbert O'Sullivan by Gilbert O'Sullivan (Tenor Sax on "'What's It All Supposed to Mean?" by Gary Barnacle) (un-credited) (album)
- 2004 Moonlighting: The Anthology by Roger Daltrey (album)
- 2006 Surrounded by Björk
- 2006 Southport Weekender Classics Vol. 1 by various artists
- 2006 The Singles by The Clash
- 2006 The Punk Singles Collection by The Ruts
- 2006 Les 100 Plus Belles Chansons De Julien Clerc (1968–2005) by Julien Clerc
- 2006 Rare Live & Remixed by Jamiroquai (Japanese 2 x Vinyl Compilation) (Includes live recordings of "Blow Your Mind" at Glastonbury) (1993) and "When You Gonna Learn" at Taratata (1993) featuring horns by Gary Barnacle/John Thirkell (album)
- 2006 Gold by Roger Daltrey (album)
- 2007 From Mr. Big to Broken Home and Back 1977–2007 by Dicken (album)
- 2007 Les 50 Plus Belles Chansons by Alain Bashung (album)
- 2008 The Collection by Jools Holland
- 2008 Tina! by Tina Turner (album)
- 2008 Greatest Hits by Paul Hardcastle and The Jazzmasters
- 2008 The Singles Collection by Shed Seven (2 cd)
- 2008 The Best Of Guru's Jazzmatazz by Guru (album)
- 2009 The Box (33rd Anniversary Special) by Supermax
- 2009 Anthology: 1983–2008 by David Knopfler (album)
- 2009 The Collection by Paul Hardcastle (album)

2010s

- 2010 Living It Up by Level 42
- 2010 40 Ans De Chansons by Luc Plamondon (4 cd)
- 2010 1983–2009: His Greatest Hits Collection by Paul Hardcastle (3 CDs)
- 2010 Move Over Darling (The Complete Stiff Recordings) by Tracey Ullman (2 CDs)
- 2011 I Owe You Nothing – The Best Of Bros by Bros (album)
- 2011 Dance Classics: Take Away The Rain by Various (incl. "Run for Cover" by Steve Grant)
- 2011 Ruts Rules by The Ruts (album)
- 2011 B-Sides and Rare Tracks Volume 4 by Siouxsie and the Banshees
- 2012 The Collection by Kim Wilde (2 CDs)
- 2012 The Hits by Kajagoogoo & Limahl
- 2012 Backstreet Brit Funk – Compiled by Joey Negro (featuring "Summer Grooves" by Mirage) (2 CDs)
- 2012 Pete Waterman Presents the Hit Factory (3 CDs) (incl. "Roadblock")
- 2013 Best Of Electro Swing by Various (UMG 5346156) (incl. "Right Now" by The Creatures featuring Gary Barnacle – Saxophone, Peter Thoms – Trombone and Luke Tunney – Trumpet)
- 2019 Keychains and Snowstorms – The Soft Cell Story (9 x CD/1 X DVD Box Set)

== Singles and extended plays ==
=== With Leisure Process ===
- "A Way You'll Never Be" (1982; 7" and 12" single; Epic)
- "Love Cascade" (1982; 12" single; Epic)
- "Cashflow"/"Cashflow (Million Dollar Mix)" (1983; 7" and 12" single; Epic)
- "Anxiety"/"Anxiety (Neurotica Mix)" (1983; 7" and 12" single; CBS, Epic)

=== With Visage ===
- "Love Glove" (7 August 1984; 7" and 12" single, Polydor)
- "Beat Boy" (4 November 1984; 7" and 12" single; Polydor)

=== As writer, arranger, and/or performer ===
1978 * 1978 "Wooly Bully" b/w "Hold On" (Written by Haridimou/Barnacle/Sellins) by Hit & Run (Brass
- Gary Barnacle – Sax/Luke Tunney – Trumpet, Backing Vocals and Trumpet:- Stuart S. Fahey, Bass:- Martin Connolly, Guitar:- Bob Sellins, Lead Vocals:- Al Haridimou) (Producer:- Mike Hurst) (single)

- 1978 "Yankee Doodle Disco" b/w "Freedom" by Liberty Belle (Produced by Chris Ife/Arranged by Dave Rowberry and Wilf Gibson/Engineered by Phil Harding/Saxophones, Flute and Piccolo by Gary Barnacle/Trumpet by Luke Tunney/Trombone by Annie Whitehead) (12-inch single)
- 1978 "Jig A Boogie" b/w "Boogie Two" by Tightrope (Brass:- Gary Barnacle/Luke Tunney) Produced by Pete Gage (guitarist) (single)
- 1978 "Tommy Gun" by The Clash (24 November 1978; 7" single; CBS)

1979

- 1979 "Shall I Do It (One More Number One)" b/w "Do It All Again" by Leslie McKeown (single)
- 1979 "When I'm Alone" by Lee Kosmin (Brass:- Gary Barnacle/Luke Tunney/Annie Whitehead) (single)
- 1979 "Long Distance Love" b/w "Long Distance Love" (Live) by Leslie McKeown (single)
- 1979 "Don't Hold Back My Bullets" b/w "Bang, Bang" by Bullet Train (Brass:- Gary Barnacle/Luke Tunney/Annie Whitehead) Produced by Scobie Ryder (single)
- 1979 "Radio W.R.O.K." by Scobie Ryder (Brass:- Gary Barnacle/Luke Tunney) Produced by Scobie Ryder (single)
- 1979 "Night After Night" by The Secret (single)
- 1979 "Moonlight and Muzak" b/w "Woman Make Man" by M (single)
- 1979 "Jah Wars" by The Ruts (Big Horns :- Gary Barnacle/Luke Tunney) (single)
- 1979 "That's the Way the Money Goes" b/w "Satisfy Your Lust (Before You Go Bust)" by M (single)

1980

- 1980 "Big Fat Man" b/w "It's Too Late" by Laurel Aitken (Produced by John Sparrow and Paul Fox) (single)
- 1980 "Telstar" by The Typhoons (a.k.a. Ruts DC) (single)
- 1980 "West One (Shine on Me)" by The Ruts (August 1980; 7" single; Virgin)
- 1980 Black Market Clash by The Clash (October 1980; EP; Epic)
- 1980 "Nerves" by Pearl Harbor (single b-side)
- 1980 "Bread and Water" by Capital Letters (Brass:- Gary Barnacle/Luke Tunney) (single)
- 1980 "I'm Gonna Make You Love Me" by Snoopy & Samantha (Produced by D. Tyrone. Brass by Gary Barnacle (Sax)/Luke Tunney (Trumpet)) (single)
- 1980 "Boogie All Night" by Bill Campbell (Brass:- Gary Barnacle/Luke Tunney) (single)
- 1980 "Be a Fool For You" b/w "Slow Dancing" by The Pianos (single)
- 1980 "Do You Wanna Dance" by Boulevard (single)
- 1980 "Ebony Eyes" by Paul Dawkins (Produced by D. Tyrone. Brass by Gary Barnacle (Sax)/Luke Tunney (Trumpet)) (single)
- 1980 "Summer Grooves" by Mirage (Horns by Gary Barnacle/Luke Tunney) (single)
- 1980 "Let There Be Love" by Gene Rondo (Produced by D. Tyrone. Brass by Gary Barnacle (Sax)/Luke Tunney (Trumpet)) (single)
- 1980 "You Can Do" by Lee Kosmin (Brass:- Gary Barnacle/Luke Tunney/Annie Whitehead) (single)
- 1980 "I've Only Just Begun" by Dennis Pinnock (Produced by Tyrone. Brass by Gary Barnacle (Sax)/Luke Tunney (Trumpet)) (single)
- 1980 "Sayonara" b/w "Dedicate This Record" by Leslie McKeown (single)
- 1980 "Official Secrets" b/w "Maniac" by M (band) (with Phil Gould (musician) – Drums/Mark King (musician) – Bass/Gary Barnacle – Sax) (single)
- 1980 "Don't Stay Out Late" b/w "Rude Boy Gone Jail" by The Regulars (Brass by Gary Barnacle – Sax/ Luke Tunney – Trumpet) Produced by Neil Brockbank (single)
- 1980 "Delicious Gone Wrong" by Bim (single)

1981

- 1981 "This Is Radio Clash" b/w "Radio Clash" by The Clash (with Gary Barnacle on Electric Saxophone) (single)
- 1981 "This Is Radio Clash" b/w "Radio Clash"/"Outside Broadcast"/"Radio 5" by The Clash (with Gary Barnacle on Saxophone and Electric Saxophone) (12-inch single)
- 1981 "Different View" b/w "Formula Eyes" by Ruts DC (single)
- 1981 "Vegas"/"Saeta" by Nico (single)
- 1981 "The Man Who Invented Himself" b/w "Dancing On God's Thumb" by Robyn Hitchcock (feat. Gary Barnacle on Tenor/Baritone Saxes) (single)
- 1981 "What's Funk" by Perry Haines (single)
- 1981 "School" by Stikki Stuff (Produced by Dan Priest) (single)
- 1981 "Starchild" b/w "Foundation and Empire Parts 1 & 2" by Level 42 (Produced by Mike Vernon) (B-side with Saxophone solo by Gary Barnacle) (single)
- 1981 "I Want To Feel Your Love" by Obi Onyioha (Horns by Gary Barnacle – Sax/Luke Tunney – Trumpet/Annie Whitehead) – Trombone) Produced by Lemmy Jackson (single)
- 1981 "Freetown" b/w "Do What ?" by The Ram Jam Band (Brass:- Gary Barnacle – Sax/Luke Tunney – Trumpet/Annie Whitehead – Trombone, plus add John Earle (musician) Baritone Sax on "Do What ?") Produced by Pete Gage (guitarist) (single)
- 1981 "Free-Town Part 2" b/w "Free-Town Part 3" by The Ram Jam Band (Brass:- Gary Barnacle – Sax/Luke Tunney – Trumpet/Annie Whitehead – Trombone) Produced by Pete Gage (guitarist) (single)
- 1981 "Can You See Me?" by The Swim (single)
- 1981 "I Can't Stop" by The Sinceros (b-side of "Disappearing" 7-inch single)
- 1981 "Rituals" by Bush Tetras (Produced by Topper Headon) (Track 2:- "Funky Instrumental" with Saxophones by Gary Barnacle/Engineered by Rafe McKenna) (12-inch single)
- 1981 "Charm" by Positive Noise (Produced by Steve Hillage – Brass by Gary & Bill Barnacle) (single)
- 1981 "Sunshine On My Pillow" by La Amour (Produced by D.Tyrone. Brass by Gary Barnacle (Sax)/Luke Tunney (Trumpet)) (single)

1982

- 1982 "Party Party" by Elvis Costello & The Attractions (1982; 7" single; A&M) (with the Royal Guard Horns: brass:- Gary Barnacle/Annie Whitehead) (single)
- 1982 "Love Cascade" by Leisure Process (Vocals:- Ross Middleton, Keyboards/Saxophone:- Gary Barnacle) (single)
- 1982 "Night Train" by Visage (11 June 1982; 7" and 12" single; Polydor)
- 1982 "Lili Voulait Aller Danser" by Julien Clerc (Produced by Stephen Stewart-Short. Saxophone by Gary Barnacle) (single)
- 1982 "This Could Be The Night" by George Chandler (Prod.Mike Vernon) (single)
- 1982 "Wooly Bully" by Attila's Brides (Producer:- Phil Wainman. Saxophone:- Gary Barnacle) (single)
- 1982 "Run Jilly Run" by Wendy Wu (Keyboards/Saxophone:- Gary Barnacle) (single)
- 1982 "Because You're Young" by Private Lives (1982; 7" and 12" single; Chrysalis)
- 1982 "Do What You Wanna Do" b/w "The Slammer" by The Cage feat Nona Hendryx (Production and drums by Rusty Egan, Bass/Keyboards – Steve Barnacle, Saxophone/Electric Saxophone/Keyboards – Gary Barnacle. "The Slammer" written by R.Egan/S.Barnacle/G.Barnacle) (single)
- 1982 "Child Come Away" by Kim Wilde (Saxophone by Gary Barnacle) (single)
- 1982 "A Way You'll Never Be" by Leisure Process (Vocals:- Ross Middleton, Keyboards/Saxophone:- Gary Barnacle, Bass:- Mark King, Drums:- Phil Gould)(single)
- 1982 "Power and the Passion" by Midnight Oil (Prod. Nick Launay) (Brass:- Gary Barnacle/Peter Thoms/Luke Tunney)
- 1982 "Halfway There" by Mike Rutherford (single)
- 1982 "T.S.O.P." by Dexy's Midnight Runners (Featuring horns by Gary Barnacle/'Big' Jim Paterson) (b-side of 12-inch version of "Jackie Wilson Said (I'm in Heaven When You Smile)")
- 1982 "Do It Cos You Like It" by Justin Fashanu (Prod. by Kris Ife) (Brass:- Gary Barnacle/Luke Tunney/Annie Whitehead) (single)

1983

- 1983 "Let Me Go" by Wendy Wu (single)
- 1983 "Educating Rita" (single release from OST) by David Hentschel
- 1983 "Shame, Shame, Shame" by Red Lipstique (single)
- 1983 "Right Now" by The Creatures (Brass:- Gary Barnacle – Saxophone, Peter Thoms – Trombone and Luke Tunney – Trumpet) (single)
- 1983 "Cashflow" by Leisure Process (Vocals:- Ross Middleton, Keyboards/Saxophone:- Gary Barnacle) (single)
- 1983 "You Disappear From View" by The Teardrop Explodes (Brass:- Gary Barnacle/Luke Tunney) (single)
- 1983 "Only For Love" by Limahl (single)
- 1983 "Rhythm Of The Rain" by Sarah Brightman (Prod. Andrew Lloyd Webber) (single) (uncredited)
- 1983 "Wait A Long Time For You" by The Thoughts (single)
- 1983 "Oscar Wilde" by Red Lipstique (1983; EP; Charly)
- 1983 "Love Blonde" by Kim Wilde (Brass:- Gary Barnacle (Saxophone)/Bill Barnacle (Trumpet)/Kenny Pyrke (Trombone)) (single)
- 1983 "Anxiety" by Leisure Process (Vocals:- Ross Middleton, Keyboards/Saxophone:- Gary Barnacle) (single)
- 1983 "Let's Stay Together" by Tina Turner (single)
- 1983 "Calling Your Name" by Marilyn (Saxophone by Gary Barnacle) (single)
- 1983 "Clean Heart" by The Inspirational Choir of the Pentecostal First Born Church of the Living God (1983; 12" single; Stiff)
- 1983 Recognition by The Europeans (1983; EP; A&M)
- 1983 Pick Me Up by The Inspirational Choir of the Pentecostal First Born Church of the Living God (1983; EP; Stiff)

1984

- 1984 "Cry And Be Free" by Marilyn (Saxophone by Gary Barnacle) (single)
- 1984 "You Don't Love Me" by Marilyn (Brass:- Gary Barnacle/Peter Thoms/Luke Tunney) (single)
- 1984 "Listen to Your Father" by Feargal Sharkey (Brass:- Gary Barnacle/Peter Thoms/Luke Tunney) (single)
- 1984 "I Wanna Be Loved" by Elvis Costello (single)
- 1984 "House of Salome" (featured on Flute/Sax) by Kim Wilde (single)
- 1984 "You Have" by Marc Almond (1984; 7", 10" and 12" single; Some Bizzare)
- 1984 "Beat Boy" (single release) by Visage
- 1984 "Dancing Girls" by Nik Kershaw (Brass:- Gary Barnacle/Peter Thoms/Luke Tunney) (uncredited) (single)
- 1984 "The Only Flame in Town" by Elvis Costello & The Attractions (1984; 12" single; F-Beat)
- 1984 "Run For Cover" by Steve Grant (of Tight Fit) (Prod. Ian Levine) (Baritone/Tenor Saxophones – Gary Barnacle) (single)
- 1984 "Glamoureuse" b\w "Mister Orwell" by Petula Clark (saxophone on "Glamoureuse" by Gary Barnacle) (Produced by Luc Plamondon/Jamie Lane) (French single)
- 1984 "Mr. Orwell" b/w "Glamoureuse" by Petula Clark (saxophone on "Glamoureuse" by Gary Barnacle) (Producer:- Jamie Lane) (UK single)
- 1984 "Hot Water" by Level 42 (single)
- 1984 "Ecstasy" by The Thoughts (single)
- 1984 "Dance For My Love" by John Stax (Produced by Stephen Stewart-Short. Written by John Stax/Simon May. Electric Saxophone solo by Gary Barnacle) (single)
- 1984 "Berlin" by Hong Kong Syndikat (1984; 12" single; Teldec, Sire)
- 1984 "Berlin" by Hong Kong Syndikat (Prod. Rusty Egan) (single)
- 1984 "Love Glove" b/w "She's A Machine" by Visage (band) (Saxophone by Gary Barnacle) (B-side written by S.Strange/R.Egan/S.Barnacle/A.Barnett/G.Barnacle) (single)
- 1984 "The Boy Who Came Back" by Marc Almond (1984; 10" and 12" single; Some Bizzare)
- 1984 "The Chant Has Begun" by Level 42 (Produced by Ken Scott.Electric Sax by Gary Barnacle) (single)
- 1984 "Bad Life" by Public Image Ltd (single)
- 1984 "I Feel Free" b/w "There Is A Dog" by Mark King
- 1984 "Down in the Subway" by Soft Cell (1984; 12" single; Some Bizzare, Vertigo)
- 1984 "Victoria Gardens" by Madness (band) (remixed version (with brass) released on the b-side of the 12" single of "One Better Day" – Prod. Langer/Winstanley) (Brass section :- Gary Barnacle/Luke Tunney/Pete Thoms)
- 1984 "Talking Cricket" by Sticky Wicket (Brass by Gary Barnacle – Sax/ Luke Tunney – Trumpet and Pete Thoms – Trombone) Produced by Andy Pask (single)

1985

- 1985 "Uncle Sam" by Madness (single)
- 1985 "Uncle Sam" (Ray Gun Mix) by Madness (Remix by Michael Brauer – Horns by Gary Barnacle) (12-inch single)
- 1985 "Who Broke That Love?" by Tom Morley (single)
- 1985 "Just For You" by Toto Coelo (single b-side)
- 1985 "Action Style" by El Train (single)
- 1985 "Sally" (Martin Meissonnier remix) by Carmel (12-inch single)
- 1985 "Lost Weekend" by Lloyd Cole and the Commotions (1985; 10" and 12" single; PolyGram, Polydor)
- 1985 "Don't Say It" by Shezwae Powell (1985; 12" maxi single; Victoria, PDI, S.A.)
- 1985 "Mutants in Mega-City One" by The Fink Brothers

1986

- 1986 "Lessons in Love" by Level 42 (single)
- 1986 "Frederick" by Sandie Shaw (Produced by Clive Langer/Alan Winstanley) with Gary Barnacle – Tenor and Baritone Saxes. (single)
- 1986 "Are You Ready To Be Heartbroken?" by Sandie Shaw (Produced by Clive Langer/Alan Winstanley) with Gary Barnacle – Alto Saxophone. (single)
- 1986 "Never Again" by Pete Shelley (Produced by Stephen Hague – Baritone, Tenor and Alto Saxophones by Gary Barnacle) (single)
- 1986 "Dear John" by Love and Money (band) (Produced by Tom Dowd with Gary Barnacle – Tenor/Alto & Electric Saxes) (single)
- 1986 "Montego Bay" by Amazulu (Brass:- Gary Barnacle/Peter Thoms/John Thirkell) (single)
- 1986 "Rebel Blue Rocker" b/w "Love Addiction" by Strange Cruise (Produced by Mike Hedges with Gary Barnacle on Saxes) (single)
- 1986 "Sweetest Girl" by Madness (single)
- 1986 "Sweetest Girl" (Dub Mix and Extended Mix) by Madness (Remixes by Michael Brauer – Horns by Gary Barnacle) (12-inch single)
- 1986 "Have You Ever Had It Blue?" by The Style Council (single)
- 1986 "Absolute Beginners" by David Bowie (March 1986; 7" and 12" single; Virgin, Jugoton, EMI America)
- 1986 "Quiet Life" by Ray Davies (single)
- 1986 "Rodrigo Bay" by Working Week (band) (single)
- 1986 "Fatal Hesitation" by Chris de Burgh (single)
- 1986 "Young Man's Dream" b/w "Hand Over Fist" (feat. Gary Barnacle – Sax) by The Gems (single)
- 1986 "Slow Emotion"/"Don't Be So Distant" by Jeb Million
- 1986 "The Beat Goes On" b/w "Silver Screen Queen" by Strange Cruise (Brass by – Gary Barnacle – Saxes/Pete Thoms – Trombone/Luke Tunney – Trumpet) (single)
- 1986 "Ink and Paper" by Modern English (single)
- 1986 "River Of People" by Love and Money (band) (Produced by Tom Dowd with Gary Barnacle – Baritone, Tenor, Alto & Electric Saxes) (single)
- 1986 "Dreamer" by Keep It Dark (single)
- 1986 "Melting Point" by The Lewis Sisters (Produced by Bobby Eli. Brass by Gary Barnacle/John Thirkell/Luke Tunney/Peter Thoms. Electric Sax solo by Gary Barnacle) (single)
- 1986 "Layin' Down A Beat" by Faze One (single) (Brass:- Gary Barnacle/John Thirkell/Vince Sullivan)
- 1986 "Hi Ho Silver" by Jim Diamond (Horns by Gary Barnacle – sax/Luke Tunney – trumpet) (single)
- 1986 "When We Kiss" by David Knopfler (with Gary Barnacle – Baritone/Tenor and Alto Saxes) (single) (uncredited)
- 1986 "Stranglehold" by Paul McCartney (with Gary Barnacle – Baritone/Tenor and Alto Saxes plus Sax Solo shared by Gary Barnacle & Lenny Pickett) (single)
- 1986 "Desire" c/w "Together" by Jim Diamond (single)
- 1986 "You'll Go Crazy" b-side of "So Strong" by Jim Diamond (single b-side)
- 1986 "The Money Ain't Worth It" by Chris Sutton (b-side of "Prince Of Justice" single)
- 1986 "Malédiction" by Alain Bashung (single) (uncredited)
- 1986 "Rain or Shine" by Five Star (single)
- 1986 "Suburbia" by Pet Shop Boys (22 September 1986; 7" and 12" single; Parlophone, Valentim de Carvalho, Pathé Marconi, EMI, Toshiba-EMI)
- 1986 "Roadblock" by Stock Aitken Waterman (1986; 7" and 12"; PWL, Teldec, A&M Records, Body Beat, Liberation, Breakout)
- 1986 "Live-in World" by The Anti-Heroin Project/The Anti-Smack Band

1987

- 1987 "China In Your Hand" by T'Pau (Alto Sax Solo by Gary Barnacle) (single)
- 1987 "Roadblock" by Stock, Aitken and Waterman (Alto Sax – Gary Barnacle) (single)
- 1987 "Pump Up the Volume" ("Roadblock" sample of Chyna (Coral Gordon) (vocals) and Gary Barnacle (sax)) by MARRS (single)
- 1987 "Breakout" by Swing Out Sister (Brass Section:- Gary Barnacle/John Thirkell/Peter Thoms/Luke Tunney) As per the album credit – registered with Phonographic Performance Limited (PPL)).
- 1987 "Addicted to Love (Live)" by Tina Turner (Tenor Sax Solo – Gary Barnacle) (single)
- 1987 "You'll Never Be Alone" b/w "I'll Be Waiting" (with Gary Barnacle – Tenor Sax) by Judy Cheeks (single)
- 1987 "I Promise You (Get Ready)" b/w "Suzie, Don't Leave Me With Your Boyfriend" by Samantha Fox (Saxophone/Electric Saxophone by Gary Barnacle) (uncredited) (single)
- 1987 "I'm A Survivor" by Zuice (Prod. Lenny White) (single) (uncredited)
- 1987 "Siamese Twist" by Flesh for Lulu (1987; 12" single; Beggars Banquet)
- 1987 "Echo Beach" by Toyah (single)
- 1987 "Success" by Picnic at the Whitehouse (single)
- 1987 "One By One" by Jo Jo and the Real People (Soprano Sax Solo) (single)
- 1987 "The Longer The Road" by Maynard Williams (theme from 'Truckers' BBC TV Series) (Prod.by Alan Winstanley) (single)
- 1987 "Fatman" by Mammoth (b/w "Political Animal" feat. Gary Barnacle on Saxophone) (single)
- 1987 "Vistete" by Nacha Pop (single)
- 1987 "Stretchin' The Pieces" by The CCR Crew (single)
- 1987 "I Don't Know" by Lanier & Co (single)
- 1987 "Whatever Makes Our Love Grow" by Edwin Starr (1987 and 1988; 12" single; 10, PWL Empire, Alfa International, BMG Ariola Benelux)
- 1987 "Twilight World" by Swing Out Sister (2 x 12-inch release (in Canada) featuring "Breakout" (Carnival Mix); Brass Section:- Gary Barnacle/John Thirkell/Peter Thoms/Luke Tunney)
- 1987 "Cowboys And Indians" by The Cross (band) (Gary Barnacle – Baritone/Tenor and Alto Saxes) (single)
- 1987 "Heaven For Everyone" by The Cross (band) (b/w "Contact" feat. Gary Barnacle – Saxes) (single)

1988

- 1988 "Don't Walk Away" by Toni Childs (single)
- 1988 "This Girl" by T'Pau (b-side to "Secret Garden" single)
- 1988 "Just A Groove" (b-side to the single "My Mind's Made Up") by Ambassadors of Funk (single)
- 1988 "Live My Life" by Boy George (Prod. John Robie) (single) (uncredited)
- 1988 "Flesh Of My Flesh" by Lavine Hudson (single)
- 1988 "Rock Together" by Mica Paris (b-side of "My One Temptation") (uncredited)
- 1988 "Whatever Makes Our Love Grow" by Edwin Starr (single) (uncredited)
- 1988 "Causing A Commotion" by Ice Cold in Alice (Prod. Graham Gouldman) (Horns :- Gary Barnacle/John Thirkell/Luke Tunney/Peter Thoms) (single)
- 1988 "I'm Sorry" by Hothouse Flowers (single)
- 1988 "Funkin' for the UK" by 3 Man Island featuring Carol Jiani (1988; 12" single; Chrysalis)
- 1988 "Magic Lover" by The Cool Notes (single)
- 1988 "Rags" by Crazyhead (as member of Phantom Horns) (single)
- 1988 "Fine Time" by Yazz (single)
- 1988 "For a Friend" by The Communards (single)
- 1988 "It'll Be Easier In The Morning" by Hothouse Flowers (single)
- 1988 "Pretending To Care" by Elliot (single)
- 1988 "Secret Garden" by T'Pau (b-side "This Girl" featuring Gary Barnacle/John Thirkell/Simon Gardener/Peter Thoms as brass section) (single)
- 1988 "Tell Me Why Love Dies" by The Duel (single)
- 1988 "European Rain" by The Big Dish (single)
- 1988 "Rio de Janvier" by Gold (Prod. Trevor Vallis) (single) (Horns:- Gary Barnacle/Peter Thoms/John Thirkell)
- 1988 "We Got The Juice" by Derek B (single)
- 1988 "Road to Our Dream" by T'Pau (single)
- 1988 "Just Another Lie" b/w "I'll Be Waiting (The Eddie Quintex Mix)" (with Gary Barnacle – Tenor Sax) by Judy Cheeks (single)
- 1988 "My Minds Made Up" by Ambassadors of Funk (1988; 12" single; Next Plateau, Living Beat, Grind)
- 1988 "Walk in the Night" by Paul Hardcastle (1988; 12" and CD maxi; Chrysalis)
- 1988 "Good"/"Naked December" by Major Matt Mason (featuring Sally Boyden and Mike Gregovich)
- 1988 "Can't Take The Hurt" by Mammoth (b/w "Political Animal" feat. Gary Barnacle – Saxophone) (12" & cd singles)
- 1988 "Heaven For Everyone" by The Cross (band) (b/w "Cowboys And Indians" feat. Gary Barnacle – Baritone/Tenor and Alto Saxes) (single)
- 1988 "Shove It !" by The Cross (band) (b/w "Cowboys And Indians" feat. Gary Barnacle – Saxes) (single)
- 1988 "Manipulator" by The Cross (band) (b/w "Stand Up For Love" feat. Gary Barnacle – Saxes) (single)
- 1988 "Delirious" by Chris Hewitt (feat. brass by Gary Barnacle – Sax/ John Barclay – Trumpet) Produced by Glenn Skinner (single)
- 1988 "Damned Don't Cry" b/w "Night Train" by Visage (band) (with Gary Barnacle on Sax) (7-inch single)

1989

- 1989 "Loving A Dream" by Sarah Jane Morris (single)
- 1989 "Beat Bomb" by Wop Bop Torledo (single)
- 1989 "Are You Ready..." by Paul Hardcastle Sound Syndicate (single)
- 1989 "Throwback" by Bankstatement (Tony Banks) (single)
- 1989 "Musica de amor" by A Man Called Adam (1989; 12" single; Ritmo)
- 1989 "Lovin' On The Side" by Reid (single)
- 1989 "Boys And Girls" by 2 Brave (single)
- 1989 "You Keep It All In" by The Beautiful South Produced by Mike Hedges (Sax and Flute – Gary Barnacle / Trombone – Pete Thoms) (single)
- 1989 "Strong" by Barry Ryan (b-side of the single "Turn Away") (Producer:- Zeus B. Held Saxophone:- Gary Barnacle) (single)
- 1989 "Standing There" by The Creatures (single)
- 1989 "Work Your Body" by Blow Fly (feat. Gary Barnacle) (single)
- 1989 "Cry" by Waterfront (TV/video only) (single)
- 1989 "Move On" by Waterfront (single)
- 1989 "Wanted" by Halo James (video only) (single)
- 1989 "Love You Feel" by Zeke Manyika (video only) (single)
- 1989 "Earthly Powers" by A Man Called Adam (1989; 12" single; Acid Jazz)
- 1989 "Atomic City" by Holly Johnson (Baritone/Electric Tenor Saxophone by Gary Barnacle – performance registered with MU/PPL) (uncredited) (Producer – Dan Hartman)(single)
- 1989 "Steamy Windows" by Tina Turner (single)
- 1989 "I Don't Wanna Lose You" by Tina Turner (single)
- 1989 "Foreign Affair" by Tina Turner (single)
- 1989 "H.A.P.P.Y. Radio" by Michaela Strachan (single)
- 1989 "Be Free with Your Love" by Spandau Ballet (1989; 7" and 12" single; CBS) (as Phantom Horns) (single)
- 1989 "Primitive Man" by Eartha Kitt (single)
- 1989 "Sound Syndicate: Are You Ready..." by Paul Hardcastle (1989; 12" single and CD maxi; AJK Music)
- 1989 "Everything that I Need (UK-Powermix)" by Timecode (1989; 12" and CD maxi; Bellaphon)
- 1989 "Shock"/"There's a Word"/"Me and You" by Major Matt Mason (featuring Sally Boyden and Mike Gregovich)
- 1989 "Where In The World" by Swing Out Sister Track 4 :- Breakout (A Rockin' Version) Brass section:- Gary Barnacle/John Thirkell/Peter Thoms/Luke Tunney (single)
- 1989 "You Better Believe It !" by Zeon Jones (with Gary Barnacle – Saxophone) (Produced by Adam Sieff and Del Taylor) (single)

1990

- 1990 "A Little Time" by The Beautiful South (Produced by Mike Hedges) (Horns :- Gary Barnacle – Sax / Kevin Brown – Sax / Pete Thoms – Trombone and Tony Robinson – Trumpet) (single)
- 1990 "My Book" by The Beautiful South (Produced by Mike Hedges) (Horns :- Gary Barnacle – Sax / Kevin Brown – Sax / Pete Thoms – Trombone / Tony Robinson – Trumpet) (single)
- 1990 "Carnival 2000" by Prefab Sprout (as Phantom Horns) (Produced by Tom Dolby) (single)
- 1990 "Treat Me Good" by Yazz (written by Simon Law/Yazz/Yvonne Turner – produced by Simon Law – horn section and solo sax by Gary Barnacle) (single)
- 1990 "True Love" by The Chimes (Track 1. "True Love") (Single Version) and Track 2. "True Love" (Extended Version) Produced by The Chimes with additional overdubs by Louie Louie and Flute by Gary Barnacle. Track 3. "True Love" (Louie Louie Remix) with Saxophone/Flute by Gary Barnacle. Track 4. "True Love" (Louie Louie Instrumental) with Flute by Gary Barnacle (single)
- 1990 "Rebel Music" by Rebel MC (single)
- 1990 "No More Tears" by Hollywood Beyond (single)
- 1990 "Move On" by Waterfront (single)
- 1990 "Abbi Dubbi" by Edoardo Bennato (single)
- 1990 "Vendo Bagnole" by Edoardo Bennato (single)
- 1990 "Word Is Out" by Kylie Minogue Produced by Stock Aitken and Waterman (Brass by Gary Barnacle – Saxophone / Pete Thoms – Trombone / John Thirkell – Trumpet) (single)
- 1990 "Keep It Together" by David Grant (Louie Louie remix) (Alto Sax/Flute by Gary Barnacle) (12-inch single)
- 1990 "Real Emotion" by Reid (single)
- 1990 "Lost Summer" b/w "Strollin"' by The Jazzmasters (12-inch single)
- 1990 "Couldn't Say Goodbye" by Tom Jones (Produced by John Hudson) (single)
- 1990 "First Time Ever [Louie-Louie Remix]" by Joanna Law (Produced by The Funky Ginger (Simon Law) and remixed by Louie-Louie) (featuring Gary Barnacle on Saxophone & Flute with Steve Barnacle – Bass & programming) (12-inch single)
- 1990 "Northern Lights" by The Jazzmasters (Written by Paul Hardcastle/Gary Barnacle and featuring Gary Barnacle on Tenor Saxophone/Flute) (12-inch single)
- 1990 "Gorgeous" by Rozlyne Clarke (single)
- 1990 "Afrika" (Love And Laughter Remix) by History Featuring Q-Tee (Tracks B1- Afrika (Louie Louie's Mix) and B2- Afrika (Louie Louie's Instrumental) – Produced by Louie Louie and featuring Gary Barnacle on Baritone/Soprano Saxophones and Flute) (12-inch single)
- 1990 The Christmas Singles by Spitting Image (single)
- 1990 "Can Can You Party" by Jive Bunny (single)
- 1990 "You've Got A Friend" by Big Fun and Sonia (feat. Gary Barnacle) (single)
- 1990 "Solid Gold" by Ashley & Jackson (single)
- 1990 "Afrika" by History featuring Q-Tee (Track 2 – Afrika (Louie Louie's Mix) Produced by Louie Louie and featuring Gary Barnacle on Baritone/Soprano Saxophones and Flute) (cd single)
- 1990 "Ease On By" by Bassomatic (Track 4:- "Soul Surrender" – Produced by William Orbit with Flute by Gary Barnacle) (4 track CD maxi-single)
- 1990 "Love Drives On" by Respect (single)
- 1990 "UK Blak" by Caron Wheeler (1990; 7" single and CD maxi; RCA)
- 1990 "The Maiden's Lament" by Jools Holland (1990; 7" single; I.R.S. Records)

1991

- 1991 "La Chitarra" by Edoardo Bennato (single)
- 1991 "Circle of One" by Oleta Adams (cd maxi single – Track 3:- "Circle Of One" ('T' Remix) Produced by The Funky Ginger (Simon Law) and Dr. Ross, with Sax/Flute by Gary Barnacle) (single)
- 1991 "Julie Through The Blinds" by The Jeremy Days (single)
- 1991 "Feel" by Ruth Joy (incl. Track 2 – Louie Louie Remix with Gary Barnacle on Baritone, Tenor and Alto Saxophones) (CD and 12-inch single)
- 1991 "The Chrono Psionic Interface" by A Man Called Adam (as Phantom Horns) (single)
- 1991 "Bitter Tears" by INXS (5-track CD and 12-inch single – incl. Track 2. "Bitter Tears" (12" Lorimer Mix) and Track 3. "Bitter Tears" (Instrumental) – both tracks remixed by Peter Lorimer, with Flute by Gary Barnacle) (single)
- 1991 "It's Still You" by Michael Ball (video only) (single)
- 1991 "Better Part Of Me" by Junior Giscombe (single)
- 1991 "Overtime" by Level 42 (single)
- 1991 "Be Thankful For What You've Got" (from Singles 90/80) by Massive Attack (single)
- 1991 "Find 'Em Fool 'Em Forget 'Em" by S'Express (1991; 7" and 12" single, and CD maxi; Rhythm King) (as Phantom Horns) (single)
- 1991 "Guaranteed" by Level 42 (single)
- 1991 "Cruel (To Be Kind)" by Lindy Layton (single)
- 1991 "I'll Be There For You" by Donna Gardier (video only) (single)
- 1991 "The Crown" by Daddy Freddy (3-track single) (Track 1). "The Crown (Radio Version)" – Gary Barnacle on Flute. Track 2. "The Crown (12 inch Ragga Mix) – Gary Barnacle on Flute/Alto Sax (uncredited) Track 3. "The Crown (Tumpin B-Line Mix)" – Gary Barnacle on Alto Sax (uncredited) (single)
- 1991 "Let Love Speak Up Itself" by The Beautiful South (single)
- 1991 "Long Hot Summer Night" by JT Taylor (single)
- 1991 "Try" by Bros (single)
- 1991 "Overtime (Live)" by Level 42 (4-track maxi-single):- 1. "Overtime" (Live) 2. "Guaranteed" (Live) 3. "If You Were Mine" (Live) 4. "Overtime" (The Hen Pecked Horns Radio Mix) (Horns on all 4 tracks:- Gary Barnacle/John Thirkell)
- 1991 "Shelter" by Bros (b-side to "Try" single)
- 1991 "Pop Muzik" by Robin Scott (single)
- 1991 "Real Love" by Driza Bone (1991; 7" and 12" single, CD maxi; 4th & Broadway, Island)
- 1991 "Word Is Out" by Kylie Minogue (28 August 1991; 7", 12", cassette and CD single; PWL)
- 1991 "Something Got Me Started" by Simply Red (cd and 12" single -incl. Track 4. "Something Got Me Started" (Perfecto Mix) by Paul Oakenfold and Steve Osborne with Gary Barnacle – Alto Sax)
- 1991 "Whenever You Need Me" by T'Pau (band) (incl. Track 3 – "China In Your Hand" (single version) – featuring Gary Barnacle – Alto Sax) (single)

1992

- 1992 "Always the Last to Know" by Del Amitri (with Baritone & Tenor Saxophones by Gary Barnacle – uncredited – registered with Phonographic Performance Limited (PPL)) (Produced by Gil Norton) (single)
- 1992 "Am I the Same Girl" b/w "Breakout" by Swing Out Sister (Brass on "Am I The Same Girl":- Gary Barnacle/Chris Davis/John Thirkell/Vince Sullivan) (Brass on "Breakout":- Gary Barnacle/John Thirkell/Peter Thoms/Luke Tunney) (Produced by Paul Staveley O'Duffy) (single)
- 1992 "Make It With You" by The Pasadenas (single)
- 1992 Celebrate Love EP – by Joanna Law (Track A2 – "Celebrate Love" – Produced by The Funky Ginger/Flute by Gary Barnacle. Track B1 – "Peace & Satisfaction" – Flute/Saxophone by Gary Barnacle) (12-inch single)
- 1992 "You Don't Have To Change" by Kiss the Sky (single)
- 1992 "A New Life" by Closer Than Close feat Beverley Skeete (Flute by Gary Barnacle) (single)
- 1992 "Got To Be You" by Koo Doo (feat Gary Barnacle) (single)
- 1992 "Don't Sweat The Technique" by Eric B and Rakim (US 12-inch single:- A1. Funky Ginger Club Mix. A2. Funky Ginger Radio Edit. B1. UK Flavor Club Version. B2. UK Flavor Single Edit. Saxophones by Gary Barnacle) (Prod. by Simon Law and Mr. Lee.)
- 1992 Get To Grips by Ronny Jordan with I.G. Culture (5-track CD and 12-inch single – Track 2. "Get To Grips" (Cool Mix) – additional production and remix by Louie Louie Vega feat. Tenor and Alto Saxes/Flute by Gary Barnacle. Track 3. "Get To Grips" (Rugged Mix) – additional production and remix by Louie Louie Vega with Tenor/Alto Saxes by Gary Barnacle) (single)
- 1992 "Fair Blows The Wind For France" by Pele (Flute/Piccolo by Gary Barnacle) (single)
- 1992 "Fireworks" by Pele (Flute/Piccolo by Gary Barnacle) (single)
- 1992 "Get Ready" by Michelle Collins (single)
- 1992 "Heaven" b/w "Sound Of Summer" by The Jazzmasters (12-inch single)
- 1992 "Self Control" on Sing by Vivienne McKone (12 inch single) (Prod. Simon Law)
- 1992 "Without Love"/"Really Miss Your Love"/"Heart Of Space"/"Body Heat" by The Jazzmasters (cd maxi-single)
- 1992 "How Can You Tell Me It's Over ?" by Lorraine Cato (Simon Law 7-inch mix & Simon Law 12-inch mix) (Flutes by Gary Barnacle) (single)
- 1992 "No Toy" by Chara (single)
- 1992 "You Got A Hold On Me" by Closer Than Close feat Beverley Skeete (single)
- 1992 "Counting Sheep" by Airhead (single)
- 1992 "I'll Live Forever!" by Jannicke (1992; CD maxi; MD)
- 1992 "Years Go By"/"Ordinary Man"/"Seconds of Your Love" by Sam Moore (Prod. Langer/Winstanley)
- 1992 "Cash" (London Remix) by Tonton David (Prod. Simon Law) (Feat. Gary Barnacle on Saxes/Flute) (single)

1993

- 1993 "When You Gonna Learn?" by Jamiroquai (CD & 12" single incl. live version of "Too Young to Die" – Live At Leadmill, Sheffield. Horns:- Gary Barnacle/John Thirkell) (single)
- 1993 "Too Young to Die" by Jamiroquai (Horns:- Gary Barnacle/John Thirkell/Richard Edwards) (single)
- 1993 "Blow Your Mind" by Jamiroquai Horns:- Gary Barnacle/John Thirkell/Richard Edwards (single)
- 1993 "Emergency On Planet Earth" by Jamiroquai (Horns:- Gary Barnacle/John Thirkell) (single)
- 1993 "Saturday's not What It Used to Be" by Kingmaker (1993; CD single; Scorch, Chrysalis)
- 1993 "You Can Depend On Me" by Rick Clarke (single)
- 1993 "Heart And Soul" by Cilla Black and Dusty Springfield (single)
- 1993 "That's What Friends Are For" by Cilla Black and Cliff Richard (single)
- 1993 "Symptoms Of A Real Love" by Jason Donovan (12-inch single)
- 1993 "If I Like It I Do It" by Jamiroquai (with brass by Gary Barnacle/John Thirkell) (single)
- 1993 "Live On French TV" CD feat. When You Gonna Learn/Too Young To Die/Tighten Up -Taratata TV show Paris 7th Sept, 1993 by Jamiroquai (Horns by Gary Barnacle/John Thirkell) (single)
- 1993 "Sound of Summer" by Paul Hardcastle (1993; CD maxi; JVC Music)
- 1993 "Spirit Of Love"/"How Deep Is Deep" by Angel C (feat. Gary Barnacle – Tenor/Alto Sax and Flute) (single)
- 1993 "Revolution 1993" by Jamiroquai (Horns arranged by Gary Barnacle/Jay Kay (singer) and performed by Gary Barnacle/John Thirkell) (12-inch single)

1994

- 1994 "Just Another Fool" by Sinclair (single)
- 1994 "All Over You" by Level 42 (single)
- 1994 "Forever Now" by Level 42 (single)
- 1994 "The Kids" by Jamiroquai (Japanese maxi-single) (Horns by:- Gary Barnacle/John Thirkell/Richard Edwards)
- 1994 "Breaking Away" by Jaki Graham (single)
- 1994 "Space Cowboy" by Jamiroquai (Track 3 – "The Kids" Brass:- Gary Barnacle/John Thirkell/Richard Edwards) (single)
- 1994 "Half the Man" (UK CD2) by Jamiroquai (Track 3 – "Too Young to Die"/Track 4 – "Blow Your Mind" Brass:- Gary Barnacle/John Thirkell/Richard Edwards) (single)
- 1994 Dance Expression of the Circle by Motoharu Sano (5 track maxi-single incl:- 1. "The Circle" (Mark McGuire Version) Sax solo:- Gary Barnacle. 4. "Tomorrow" (Mañana Version) Flute solo:- Gary Barnacle. 5. "Angel" (Night Version) Sax solo (un-credited):- Gary Barnacle)
- 1994 Stillness in Time by Jamiroquai (Japanese maxi-single) – Track 2 "Space Clav" written by Smith/Zender/Barnacle (uncredited but registered with PRS/MCPS and featuring Gary Barnacle on Flutes). (single)
- 1994 "Half the Man" (UK CD1) by Jamiroquai (Track 2 "Space Clav" written by Smith/Zender/Barnacle (uncredited but registered with PRS/MCPS) and featuring Gary Barnacle on Flutes. (single)
- 1994 Latin Connection E.P. by Agora (1994; EP; Z)
- 1994 "Dark Chapter"/"Owner of the Factory"/"Giant Bonaparte"/"Cranley Gardens"/"I've Lost You"/"Soul Serenade" by Pete Deane (Prod. Jeff Scantlebury)
- 1994 "Where Is the Feeling?" (West End TKO mix) by Kylie Minogue (Brass by the Phantom Horns)
- 1994 "Save Our Love" by Eternal (band) (Simon Law Mix with brass by Gary Barnacle – Sax/ Dennis Rollins – Trombone) (12" single)
- 1994 "Half the Man" by Jamiroquai (12-inch version :- Track B2 – "Space Clav" – Written by Gary Barnacle/Toby Smith/Stuart Zender and featuring Gary Barnacle on Flutes) (single)

1995

- 1995 "Going For Gold" by Shed Seven (single) (as the Phantom Horns Gary Barnacle/John Thirkell)
- 1995 "Getting Better" by Shed Seven (single) (as the Phantom Horns Gary Barnacle/John Thirkell)
- 1995 "Stillness in Time" by Jamiroquai (UK CD2) (Track 2 – "Emergency on Planet Earth" Brass:- Gary Barnacle/John Thirkell) (single)
- 1995 "Things Change" by Charlie Dore (single)
- 1995 "Really Miss Your Love" by The Jazzmasters (12-inch single)

1996

- 1996 "Shine On Me" by Tomoki Hirata featuring Yvonne Yanney (Soprano Saxophone/Flute by Gary Barnacle) (single)
- 1996 "Love Rules" by West End (single)
- 1996 "Inside" by Soda (single)
- 1996 "Cookie" by David Devant And His Spirit Wife (single)
- 1996 "Do You Dream Of Me?" by Steve McCauley (Brass section :- Gary Barnacle/Peter Thoms/Stuart Brooks) (Producer – Peter Oxendale) (single)
- 1996 "Average Man" by Symposium (single)
- 1996 "Never Again" by Happy Clappers (1996; 12" single; Coliseum, Shindig)
- 1996 "Cosmic Girl" (UK CD1) by Jamiroquai (Track 2 – "Slipin'n' Slidin"' Brass:- Gary Barnacle/John Thirkell) (single)
- 1996 "Still A Thrill" by Sybil Lynch (single)
- 1996 "Fun Fun Fun" by Status Quo with The Beach Boys (single)
- 1996 "Surprise" by Bizarre Inc (single)
- 1996 "You And I (Keep Holding On)" by Billie Ray Martin (1996; CD maxi; Magnet)

1997

- 1997 "Fizzy" by Symposium (b-side to "Drink The Sunshine" single)
- 1997 "I Miss You" by Björk (single)
- 1997 "High Times" (UK CD1/UK CD2) by Jamiroquai (Horns:- Gary Barnacle/John Thirkell) (single)
- 1997 "I Wanna Be The Only One" by Eternal (Prod. Nigel Lowis) (single) (Horns:- Gary Barnacle/Stuart Brooks/Andy Rogers – registered with Phonographic Performance Limited (PPL)))
- 1997 "Are You Jimmy Ray?" by Jimmy Ray (single)
- 1997 "Still a Thrill" by Sybil (1997; 12" single; Coalition)

1998

- 1998 "Starsky & Hutch: The Theme" by Andy G's Starsky & Hutch Allstars featuring Huggy Bear (1998; CD maxi; Virgin)
- 1998 "Keep A-Knockin'" by Roger Taylor (Queen)
- 1998 "Slowly Taking Over" by Sista Nature (Written by G.Barnacle/M.Reid/I.Reid and incl. Gary Barnacle on Co-Production/Engineering/Keyboards and programming) (single on Arista/Word of Mouth Records)
- 1998 "We're The Sweeney" by The Filthy 3 (featuring Spoken Vocal by Phil Cornwell and Gary Barnacle on Sax)

1999

- 1999 "Back Together Again" by Maxi Priest (single)
- 1999 "Memorias De Crianca" by Pedro Camilo (single)
- 1999 "Blue Cactus" by Hajime Mizoguchi (single)

2000

- 2000 "Space Rider" by Shaun Escoffery (single)

2001

- 2001 "Get That Groove In" by Blo (Horns by Gary Barnacle/Luke Tunney) (single)
- 2001 "Benny" (a.k.a. Yakety Sax) by The Trixters (single)

2002

- 2002 "Twelve Inch Singles" by Soft Cell
- 2002 "Blow Away" by New World (Produced by Gary Barnacle) (4 track maxi-single cd)

2004

- 2004 "Can U Feel It?" by Positive Flow feat Donna Gardier (single)

2005

- 2005 "Zoom" by Jazz Junkie (2005; MP3)
- 2005 "The City Streets" by Positive Flow featuring Donna Gardier (2005; 12" single; Native Source)

2007

- 2007 "Closer" by Travis (on CD maxi version of "Closer" – Track 3:- "The Great Unknown" with Baritone/Tenor Saxes by Gary Barnacle) (single)

2008

- 2008 "Hurt" by Patsy Peters (Vocals – engineered/arranged and track mixed by:- Gary Barnacle) (single)

2011

- 2011 "The Trumpeter" by Ray Foxx (featuring Phantom Horns:- Gary Barnacle/John Thirkell) (single)

2012

- 2012 "La Musica" by Ray Foxx featuring Lovelle (with Phantom Horns:- Gary Barnacle/John Thirkell) (single)

2013

- 2013 "Any Minute Now" by Andrea Magee (single)

2015

- 2015 "Tides" by Audioshock (feat. Gary Barnacle on Soprano/Alto Saxes) (single)
- 2015 "Everything Is Gonna Be Alright" by Vivienne McKone (Nigel Lowis remix) (Vocals recorded by Gary Barnacle @ 241 Studios) (single)
- 2015 "Till The Money Run$ Out" by Cutting Crew (Feat. the Blackjack Horns – Nik Carter/Gary Barnacle – Saxes/ Jack Birchwood – Trumpet and Steven Fuller – Trombone) (single)

2017

- 2017 "Morning Love" by Simon Law featuring Caron Wheeler. Written by S.Law/C.Wheeler. (Flutes – engineered and played by Gary Barnacle) (on Dome Records) (single)
- 2017 "Fire On Fire" (Nigel Lowis Remixes) by Simon Law featuring Lain Gray. Written by S.Law/L.Gray/G.Barnacle. (with Blackjack Horns :- Nik Carter/Gary Barnacle – Saxes/ Jack Birchwood – Trumpet & Trombone. Horns arranged and engineered by Gary Barnacle). (on Dome Records) (single)
- 2017 "Dead End Morning" by David Palfreyman – (with Gary Barnacle and Terry Edwards – Saxophones) – taken from the 'Decades' album by David Palfreyman and Nicholas Pegg – released on Diteli Records. (single)
- 2017 "Rocket Ship" by Simon Law featuring Lain Gray (with Flutes by Gary Barnacle) (on Dome Records) (single)

2019

- 2019 "Palm Trees" by e-bit & Gary Barnacle (single)
- 2019 "I Thought That I Could Never Love Again" featuring Erik Stein by Rusty Egan (single)

2021

- 2021 "Palm Trees" by e-bit & Gary Barnacle (single)
- 2021 Beautiful Wounds by Phil Gould (album)

== DVDs and video albums ==
- 2003 Prince's Trust Rock Gala – Vol 3 (DVD)
- 2003 PopArt: Pet Shop Boys – The Videos by Pet Shop Boys
- 2019 Say Hello Wave Goodbye by Soft Cell (Live at the O2) (DVD/Blu-ray)
