= Grin and Bear It (disambiguation) =

Grin and Bear It is a comic strip panel published since 1932.

Grin and Bear It may also refer to:

- "Grin and Bear It" (Ugly Betty), a 2007 television episode
- Grin and Bear It (film), a 1954 Disney animated short film starring Donald Duck
- Grin and Bear It (album), a 1992 album by Impellitteri
- Grin & Bear It, a 1980 album by The Ruts
