= Animal Now =

Studio album by The Ruts D.C.
- Released: 1981
- Recorded: I.C.C. Eastbourne; Farmyard Studios; The Manor
- Genre: Punk rock
- Length: 39:35
- Label: Virgin Records
- Producer: John Brand, The Ruts DC

The Ruts D.C. chronology
Grin & Bear It (1980)	Animal Now (1981)	Rhythm Collision (1982)

Professional ratings
Review scores
Source	Rating
Allmusic	4/5 stars

Animal Now is an album by British punk band The Ruts D.C., following a name change from "The Ruts." It was released in 1981 on Virgin Records.

The album is notable for having some interesting run-out etchings on the vinyl. The Side A etching reads "BEWARE..."; the Side B etching reads "...THE CURSE OF ODIN."

== Track listing ==
All songs written by Dave Ruffy, John Jennings, Gary Barnacle and Paul Fox

=== Side A ===
1. "Mirror Smashed" 3:27
2. "Dangerous Minds" 3:34
3. "Slow Down" 4:23
4. "Despondency" 3:48
5. "Different View" 4:01

=== Side B ===
1. "No Time To Kill" 4:37
2. "Fools" 6:34
3. "Walk Or Run" 3:28
4. "Parasites" 5:25

== Personnel ==
Ruts DC

- John "Segs" Jennings - Vocals, Keyboards, Bass
- Paul Fox - Vocals, Guitars, Keyboards
- Dave Ruffy - Vocals, Drums, Piano Strings, Percussion
- Gary Barnacle - Tenor, Alto, Baritone & Soprano Saxophones, Synthesized Saxophones, Keyboards

with:

- Bill Barnacle - Trumpet on "Dangerous Minds" and "Fools"
- Louise Freedman - Additional Vocals on "No Time to Kill"

== Production ==
- Produced by The Ruts D.C. & John Brand
- Engineered by John Brand
