= The Peel Sessions (The Ruts album) =

Compilation album by The Ruts
- Released: 1986
- Recorded: 14 May 1979
- Genre: Punk rock
- Label: Strange Fruit
- Producer: Tony Wilson

The Ruts chronology
Rhythm Collision Dub (1982)	The Peel Sessions (1986)	The Ruts Live (1987)

Professional ratings
Review scores
Source	Rating
Allmusic	4/5 stars

The Peel Sessions is a compilation album by The Ruts, released in 1986. It comprises The Ruts' live sessions recorded in May 1979 for Radio 1's John Peel Show. Its vinyl release is similar to a twelve-inch single, as it was designed to be played at 45 rpm.

== Track listing ==
1. "SUS"
2. "Society"
3. "You're Just A..."
4. "It Was Cold"
5. "Something That I Said"
