= The Crack =

Studio album by The Ruts
- Released: 29 September 1979
- Recorded: 1979
- Studio: The Town House, London
- Genre: Punk rock
- Length: 54:34
- Label: Virgin
- Producer: Mick Glossop; The Ruts; Bob Sargeant

The Ruts chronology
The Crack (1979)	Grin & Bear It (1980)

Professional ratings
Review scores
Source	Rating
AllMusic	4.5/5 stars
Classic Rock	9/10
Mojo	5/5 stars
Q	4/5 stars
Select	4/5 medals
Uncut	9/10

The Crack is the debut album by English punk rock band The Ruts, released in 1979.

The album contains the UK hit singles "Babylon's Burning" (number seven on the UK chart in June 1979) and "Something That I Said" (number 29 in September 1979). The white-reggae "Jah War", which was written in the aftermath of the Southall unrest and the over-use of force by the Metropolitan Police Service's Special Patrol Group in 1979, was also released as a single but did not make the UK chart.

== Artwork ==
The cover picture by artist John H. Howard shows the members of the group (from left to right: Malcolm Owen, Paul Fox, Dave Ruffy and Segs – who is perusing a copy of Exchange and Mart) seated on a large sofa, around them are some of their contemporaries such as Rat Scabies and Captain Sensible of The Damned (top right corner), Jimmy Pursey of Sham 69 (bottom right), while Peter Cook and Dudley Moore are standing behind Malcolm, John Peel appears to be doing something to a schoolgirl (in uniform) with a bar of chocolate on the left hand side, Jimi Hendrix looks on from the right, the wives and girlfriends of the band members appear in various poses, as does the band's roadie Mannah (seen from the back) who assisted in writing the song "S.U.S." which deals with the vagrancy act, widely used by London's Metropolitan Police Service in the late 1970s. The astronomer Patrick Moore looks on somewhat disapprovingly from the left.

The album sleeve contains a dedication to Jimmy O'Neal, one of the organizers of the Deeply Vale Free Festival, where the band had their beginnings.

The original painting is now in the possession of punk icon (and fan and friend of the Ruts), Henry Rollins, who had gone on a search for the painting with the band's blessing. Rollins proudly displayed the painting in a video promoting the 2019 remastered vinyl edition of The Crack.

== Track listing ==
All tracks are written by The Ruts (Paul Fox, John Jennings, Malcolm Owen, Dave Ruffy); except where indicated.

No.	Title	Writer(s)	Length
1.	"Babylon's Burning"		2:35
2.	"Dope for Guns"		2:11
3.	"S.U.S."	The Ruts; Richard Mannah	3:49
4.	"Something That I Said"		3:53
5.	"You're Just A..."		2:55
6.	"It Was Cold"		6:48
7.	"Savage Circle"		3:05
8.	"Jah War"		6:55
9.	"Criminal Mind"		1:34
10.	"Backbiter"		3:02
11.	"Out of Order"		1:50
12.	"Human Punk" (live at The Marquee, London, 19 July 1979)		4:34

CD bonus tracks
No.	Title	Length
13.	"Give Youth a Chance" (B-side of "Something That I Said"; produced by Bob Sargeant)	3:07
14.	"I Ain't Sofisticated" (B-side of "Jah War")	2:16
15.	"The Crack" (B-side of "West One (Shine On Me)")	5:49

== Personnel ==
The Ruts

- Malcolm Owen – vocals
- Paul Fox – guitar, backing vocals; occasional organ on "Jah War"
- John "Segs" Jennings – bass guitar, backing vocals; piano ("stanking Steinway") on "Jah War"
- Dave Ruffy – drums, percussion, backing vocals

with:

- Richard Mannah – backing vocals on "S.U.S" and "Criminal Mind"
- Bertie, Pocky, Rocky – backing vocals on "Jah War"
- Mick Glossop – synthesizer effects on "It Was Cold"
- Gary Barnacle – saxophone
- Luke Tunney – trumpet

Technical

- Mick Glossop – production, engineering, mixing
- The Ruts – cover concept
- John H. Howard – front cover painting

== Charts ==
Chart (1979)	Peak position
UK Albums (Official Charts)	16
