= The Ruts =

British reggae-influenced punk rock band

- The Ruts c. 1979

Background information
- Also known as: The Ruts D.C.
- Origin: London, England
- Genres: Reggae punk, punk rock, reggae rock, ska punk
- Years active: 1977–1983, 2007–present
- Labels: People Unite, Virgin, Bohemian, Sosumi, Westworld
- Members: David Ruffy; John "Segs" Jennings; Leigh Heggarty
- Past members: Malcolm Owen (deceased); Paul Fox (deceased); Seamus Beaghan; Molara Avon
- Website: www.theruts.co.uk

The Ruts (later known as The Ruts D.C.) are an English reggae-influenced punk rock band, notable for the 1979 UK top 10 hit single "Babylon's Burning", and an earlier single "In a Rut", which was not a hit but was highly regarded and regularly played by BBC Radio 1 disc jockey John Peel. The band's newfound success was cut short by the death of lead singer Malcolm Owen from a heroin overdose in 1980. Despite this, the band continued under a different musical style as Ruts D.C. until 1983, when they disbanded.

The band reformed in 2007, shortly before their original guitarist Paul Fox died of cancer the same year. The Ruts D.C. currently consists of the band's original bassist and drummer, John "Segs" Jennings and David Ruffy, with a new guitarist, Leigh Heggarty.

== Initial career as The Ruts (1977–1980) ==
=== Formation (1977) ===
Paul Fox met and befriended Malcolm Owen and Paul Mattocks during his schooling days in Hayes; the three originally formed Aslan, a progressive rock band, and resided in an intentional community until the community's disbandment in 1975, at which point Fox joined a ten-piece funk band called Hit & Run alongside Dave Ruffy and eight other members total.

The Ruts officially formed in Hayes in August 1977 when Fox reunited with Ruffy and Owen. The band's "classic" lineup consisted of singer Malcolm Owen, guitarist Paul Fox, bassist John "Segs" Jennings, and drummer Dave Ruffy. The band played their first live performance in Northolt Middlesex on 16 September 1977; the band they performed with, Mr. Softy, was another group in which Paul Fox was a member.

=== Rock Against Racism, debut single, BBC Peel Sessions (1978–1979) ===
The Ruts soon became involved in political and anti-racist musical initiatives partially as a response to the band members witnessing the National Front, a Neo-Nazi movement, recruiting youths. Early in the band's career, The Ruts became involved in the Rock Against Racism campaign. At a show for the campaign, The Ruts met members of a British roots reggae band called Misty in Roots, who invited The Ruts to record a single for their label/collective, People Unite. In late 1978, on the People Unite label, The Ruts released their debut single "In a Rut"/"H-Eyes," which sold 20,000 copies.

In a 24 March 1979 interview, Malcolm Owen would suggest that the band's involvement with Rock Against Racism had more to do with the fact that the movement offered The Ruts performing opportunities they otherwise would not have had, and less because of the band's own personal or political stances: "We gigged solidly in the [Rock Against Racism] clubs with bands like [Misty in Roots]. . . . We played gigs like that for a year with virtually nothing else. . . . they were giving us gigs when no one else was." In another interview in February 2009, Ruffy concurred that The Ruts "were not particularly political," but the bandmates were friends with the members of Misty in Roots, and "music really does break down barriers. It was great to play gigs together and present a united front. I feel it was a good thing to present to the crowd, as there was a lot of hatred about what with the rise of the National Front, and the seemingly very racist SPG (Special Patrol Group)... a kind of riot police." Jennings recalled in the same interview that Malcolm Owen met the members of Misty in Roots through connections in the town in which he lived. In a 2013 interview, Jennings stated that the band "didn't set out" to be political and that their lyrics were "just about what we saw was going on at the time," also being inspired by the band members' working class roots and their experiences watching black friends and acquaintances being racially profiled by Southall police: "The messages were, of course, political, but they were very much coming out of the experiences of us and our friends rather than us going 'Let's study politics'." Jennings also said that the members of Misty in Roots introduced members of The Ruts to reggae music during casual hangouts.

"In a Rut" piqued the interest of BBC Radio 1 DJ John Peel. Months after the release of the single, Peel invited the band to perform in one of his radio show's Peel Sessions. The band did not perform "In a Rut" during their set, but their set led to a second session for the BBC, this time at the invitation of DJ David Jensen, in February 1979; Peel invited the band to a second Peel Session in May 1979. Following the band's BBC sessions, Virgin Records executives offered The Ruts a record deal in spring 1979.

=== The Crack, "Babylon's Burning," "Staring at the Rude Boys" (late 1979–early 1980) ===
Following their signing to Virgin Records, the band recorded and released the 1979 single "Babylon's Burning," which had a B-side of "Society." The song is stylistically rooted in punk rock with reggae influences, with lyrics addressing strife and protest in the UK's urban centres. The single's initial success also led to the band making an appearance on Top of the Pops on 21 June as the song barely reached the top 40 of the UK singles chart, and the band's appearance on Top of the Pops helped propel the song to further chart success. "Babylons' Burning" proved to be The Ruts' highest-charting single, peaking at number 7 on the UK singles chart, remaining on the chart for 11 cumulative weeks, and becoming the fifth most successful punk rock song in UK chart history, behind four songs by the Sex Pistols. It sold 230,000 copies to Jennings' recollection, just 20,000 sales short of achieving silver certification. Their follow-up single, "Something That I Said," peaked in the top 30 of the UK singles chart.

The Ruts toured as a support act with The Damned later in 1979. Following the tour, they released their debut album The Crack on 29 September 1979. The Crack peaked at number 16 on the UK albums chart and also featured "Babylon's Burning" as its opening track; the album's version of the song features a blaring alarm and police sirens before the instrumentals start, although the alarms and sirens are absent from the single version.

The Ruts released "Jah War" as their next single to promote the album. "Jah War" is more reggae-influenced and dub-influenced than "Babylon's Burning." It contains lyrics that also address urban unrest and riots but are more blatantly political than "Babylon's Burning", specifically taking inspiration from London's Southall riots following the death of Blair Peach at the hands of London police. "Jah War" did not chart at all and was "informally banned" from being played on British radio stations due to its controversial lyrical content.

In 1980, The Ruts had their first headlining tour. Following the tour, the band featured on a new single by Jamaican ska musician Laurel Aitken, "Rudi Got Married." In April 1980, the band released a new single, the two-tone-inspired "Staring at the Rude Boys," which peaked at number 22 on the UK singles chart.

=== Death of Malcolm Owen, the end of The Ruts' initial run (June–December 1980) ===
Despite the band's success, Malcolm Owen's issues within his private life generated strife within the band. Owen had a years-long addiction to heroin, which worsened after he and his wife separated in 1980. The band was due to begin writing and recording material for their second album following The Crack, but Owen's issues with his addiction led the band to cancel several UK tour dates. After recording one last single with Owen, "West One (Shine on Me)," the band fired him. They released the single shortly thereafter.

Following his firing, Owen attempted to reconcile with his band mates, agreeing to meet with them. The meeting was a success, and the band welcomed Owen back with the intent to record additional music with him. While Owen appeared to have begun recovering from his addiction, he soon experienced a heroin overdose over the weekend of 11 July 1980 and died by accidental drowning in his bathtub on 14 July 1980, at the age of 26.

One month following Owen's death, "West One (Shine on Me)" charted in the UK, peaking at number 43 in August 1980.

In the immediate aftermath of Owen's death, Rat Scabies invited the remaining members of The Ruts on a short series of tour dates "by way of helping [them] through [their] grief." During those concerts, Jennings and Fox exchanged lead vocal duties. The Ruts also served as a backing band for Kevin Coyne, and although their project with Coyne was initially intended to be a "giveaway," Coyne featured their five songs on the A-side of his 1980 album Sanity Stomp.

The Ruts' final release under their initial name was Grin & Bear It, a compilation album consisting of B-sides, outtakes, three early demos, and audio recordings of live performances, including some from the band's Peel Sessions. "Staring at the Rude Boys" was included on Grin & Bear It, as was an alternate version of "Babylon's Burning" and its B-side, "Society." Virgin Records began collecting songs for the compilation after Owen's death; the compilation was released in late 1980 and peaked at number 28 on the UK albums chart in on 18 October.

== The Ruts D.C. (1980–present) ==
=== Initial reformation as The Ruts D.C., Animal Now (1980–1981) ===
The Ruts, at the time consisting of Ruffy, Fox, and Jennings, renamed themselves The Ruts D.C. with "D.C." standing for the Italian phrase da capo, meaning "from the beginning," to signify a restart in the aftermath of Owen's death. Part of the band's restart involved shifting their musical style, performing more in line with dub music and a more dedicated fusion of reggae and punk rock. The band's restart led to the release of Animal Now, their first album since their renaming, in May 1981 on Virgin Records. Also in 1981, The Ruts served as the backing band for Valérie Lagrange's album Chez moi. Animal Now featured several songs that had been written and even recorded prior to Owen's death; some were written afterwards. All the band members sang lead vocals at various points during the recording of Animal Now, although Jennings considered himself the band's lead vocalist at that time and served as the band's frontman during live performances, a task he found "difficult and sometimes depressing[,] basically," partially because he felt as if he was "walking in Malcolm's shoes on the old songs and as a frontman."

Despite Owen's death, in a 2009 interview, Ruffy and Jennings disputed the idea that his death served as a significant setback to the band's progress, as "Malcolm had been very unreliable for some time," and the band had adjusted to a routine wherein Ruffy, Fox, and Jennings would write music, while Owen would later "arrive and just start singing." Ruffy and Jennings stated that they had always viewed themselves as "a trio [with] a frontman" and also cited their work with Aitken and Lagrange as evidence of their continued momentum in the months preceding and following Owen's death. They also stated that they searched for a replacement for Owen yet could not find one.

=== Rhythm Collision, Vol. 1, breakup (1982–1983) ===
After the release of Animal Now, The Ruts departed Virgin Records, due in part to a "[falling] out" with the label, their grief over having lost their frontman and close friend in Owen, and their desire to record a new album without the constraints of a label's expectations. Coyne loaned the band £1,000 to record a new album independently. While searching for a place where they could record a new album, they read a newspaper advertisement for ARIWA Studios, which belonged to dub producer Mad Professor, who agreed to meet with the band. Their first meeting produced three recordings; The Ruts and Mad Professor ultimately collaborated on a follow-up album, Rhythm Collision, Vol. 1, released in July 1982. Unlike the band's previous albums, Rhythm Collision, Vol. 1 was entirely a dub reggae album and represented a "total departure" from the band's previous style.

Neither Animal Now nor Rhythm Collision, Vol. 1 charted in the UK. Eventually, according to Jennings, the band felt mounting pressure in the aftermath of Owen's death: "It became. . . . more difficult as it became evident that we were, naturally, to be compared to The Ruts with Malcolm." The Ruts D.C. dissolved in 1983.

=== Interim period (1983–2007) ===
The record deal The Ruts signed with Virgin Records would leave the band in longtime debt. Jennings later stated that he and Ruffy had wanted to keep The Ruts an independent band, but Owen and Fox wanted to be signed by a label due to the marketing opportunities being signed would provide. By the time Jennings gave an interview in May 1992, the band was left in debt of £23,000, which was less debt than they had a decade prior, as the band members paid a significant amount of the debt by 1992. Still, Jennings stated that he did not have regrets about the record deal: "I still do maintain now that it was better to have had a really bad deal, but had fun and released some great records, than not at all. I don't have any regrets about it. I can't really afford to feel too bitter about it, but I'd like justice. The point I think is wrong is that Virgin didn't misinform us, but they didn't fully inform us either. They knew what they were doing. All record companies do, and that's what I hate."

In 1987, Dojo Records and Castle Communications released Ruts Live, an eleven-track album licensed from Link Communications. Also in 1987, BBC label Strange Fruit collected together the group's three Radio One sessions for The Peel Session Album: The Ruts. Live albums soon followed, including BBC Radio One in Concert (Windsong) recorded at London's Paris Theatre on 7 July 1979, The Ruts Live (Dojo) and Live and Loud! (Link).

In 1995, an American offshoot of Virgin Records, Caroline Records, released a greatest hits album titled Something That I Said: The Best of The Ruts. In 2000, In a Can, a collection of previously unreleased demos, was released. Throughout the 2000s, several of The Ruts' additional collections, tribute albums, and live recordings were released. One of those was Bustin' Out: The Essential Ruts Collection in 2001, released by Virgin Records. The collection included a previously unreleased instrumental track called "Denial," and an interview with Jennings. Another included Babylon's Burning: Reconstructed Dub-Drenched Soundscapes, a 2005 tribute album to "Babylon's Burning" featuring 16 remixes and covers of the song by bands and musicians from various genres, including Die Toten Hosen, Don Letts, Rob Smith, Dreadzone, and the Groove Corporation.

In 2006, Paul Fox, who had been in semi-retirement, performed several of The Ruts' songs with his son Lawrence playing drums; the two performed under the name Foxy's Ruts and were the support act for Bad Manners, a British ska band, during their December 2006 tour of the UK.

=== Benefit concert and death of Paul Fox (2007) ===
On 16 July 2007, The Ruts D.C. reformed for the first time in 24 years and played a benefit gig for Fox following his diagnosis of lung cancer. Henry Rollins stood in for Owen as the band's vocalist at the benefit gig. The Ruts were supported by Tom Robinson, the Damned, Misty in Roots, UK Subs, Splodge (Splodgenessabounds), John Otway, and the Peafish House Band. Fox died on 21 October of the same year, at the age of 56.

On 25 January 2008, London's Shepherd's Bush Empire venue featured an event wherein Henry Rollins presented a short film about the Paul Fox benefit concert titled The Gig, to support the charity Macmillan Cancer Support. The event at Bush Empire also featured live performances from Alabama 3, T. V. Smith, members of the Members, the Damned's Captain Sensible, and Beki Bondage.

=== Release of new music and recent developments (2008–present) ===
After Fox's death, Jennings and Ruffy continued working under the Ruts D.C. moniker while adding new touring band members, including Seamus Beaghan as an organist, Molara Avon as a vocalist, and Leigh Heggarty as a guitarist. The new five-piece group collaborated with Mad Professor once again to release Rhythm Collision Vol. 2, a successor to the original Rhythm Collision Vol. 1, in 2013. According to Jennings, the second Rhythm Collision was largely the product of improvisational sessions with their new band and several guest contributors, including several members of Misty in Roots and Alabama 3.

2015 saw the publication of Love in Vain: The Story of The Ruts & Ruts D.C. The book featured a foreword by Henry Rollins.

In 2016, The Ruts D.C. announced their plans to release a new album, Music Must Destroy. Unlike the prior Rhythm Collision albums, Music Must Destroy was a return to form for the band and more rooted in punk rock. Jennings stated that one of the album's tracks, "Psychic Attack," was "the first punk rock song [they wrote] for The Ruts since 1980," and as a result, the band chose to make it their first release prior to the full album's eventual release on 16 September. Guest musicians on the project included Rollins, who sang on the title track; additionally, "Kill the Pain" features Jake Burns of Stiff Little Fingers and Kirk Brandon of Theatre of Hate.

In 2019, to commemorate the upcoming 40th anniversary of The Crack, Jennings, Ruffy, and Heggarty played the album in its entirety on several tour dates. By that point, Jennings and Ruffy were resolute about keeping The Ruts D.C. a three-piece band at most, consisting of Jennings, Ruffy, and Heggarty. Ruffy stated in a 2019 interview that although the band had attempted to be a five-member group when they first reformed The Ruts D.C. in 2007, "the only people who really knew who we were was [Jennings] and I, so we had to keep it in-house. And that's why now we are a trio, not a four-piece or a five-piece."

On 11 November 2022, The Ruts released the full-length album Counterculture? on their own label, Sosumi Recordings.

== Legacy and influence ==
In 2010, The Quietus writer John Robb identified The Ruts as the first of several "second wave punk rock" musicians, praising the band for their short but "stunning 18-month assault that should be remembered to this day" and for the band's creativity, innovation, and imagination. Robb singled out Owen's charismatic stage presence as a defining feature of the band's early success. Robb acknowledged that Owen's death disrupted the band's momentum and left unanswered the question of "what [The Ruts] and Malcolm Owen could have become," although he also acknowledged that The Ruts were "one of [the] key bands of their generation."

Henry Rollins has identified The Ruts as an influential band he explored in his youth. In 2024, he called The Crack an album "without peer" and "one of the most important records of [his] life." Several years prior, Rollins tracked down and purchased the original painting The Ruts used as the cover art for The Crack.

Brian Baker, one of Bad Religion's guitarists, cited "Babylon's Burning" as being influential to him. Baker stated that he found the song's prominent riff particularly influential and "copied" it on several Bad Religion records: "I'd heard Ramones and Sex Pistols, but never anything articulated like this and nothing that built this kind of tension." Baker stated that Paul Fox's performance on the song inspired him to begin playing the guitar.

== Discography ==
=== Albums ===
Year	Album	Label	UK
1979	The Crack	Virgin	16
1980	Grin & Bear It	Virgin	28
1981	Animal Now (as Ruts D.C.)	Virgin	—
1982	Rhythm Collision (as Ruts D.C.)	Bohemian	—
2013	Rhythm Collision Volume 2 (as Ruts D.C.)	Sosumi	—
2016	Music Must Destroy (as Ruts D.C.)	Westworld/Sosumi	—
2021	Electracoustic Volume One (as Ruts D.C.)	Sosumi	—
2022	Counterculture? (as Ruts D.C.)	Sosumi	—
"—" denotes releases that did not chart.

=== Live ===
- BBC Radio 1 Live in Concert (Windsong International – split with Penetration)
- The Ruts Live (1987: Castle Communications)
- Live at Deeply Vale 1970's (2006: Ozit)
- Get Out of It Live (2006: Ozit)
- Live On Stage Ruts DC 2014 Sosumi SOSLP103

=== Selective compilation albums and EPs ===
- The Peel Sessions (December 1986: Strange Fruit)
- Peel Sessions – Complete Sessions 1979–1981 (May 1990: Strange Fruit)
- Demolition Dancing (1994: Receiver) – mostly live material, and including two tracks with the Damned: "Shakin' All Over" and "In a Rut"
- Something That I Said: The Best of the Ruts (March 1995: Virgin)
- Bustin’ Out: The Essential Ruts Collection (June 2001: EMI)
- The Crack/Grin and Bear It (2003, EMI; both original albums on one CD)

=== Singles ===
Year	Title	UK
1979	"In a Rut"	―
1979	"Babylon's Burning"	7
1979	"Something That I Said"	29
1979	"Jah War"	―
1980	"Staring at the Rude Boys"	22
1980	"West One (Shine on Me)"	43
1981	"Different View" (as Ruts D.C.)	―
1981	"Dangerous Minds" (as Ruts D.C.)	―
1982	"Whatever We Do" (as Ruts D.C.)	―
1983	"Weak Heart" (as Ruts D.C.)	―
1983	"Stepping Bondage"	―
2016	"Music Must Destroy" (with Henry Rollins; as Ruts D.C.)	―
2016	"Psychic Attack" (as Ruts D.C.)	―
2020	"War on Crime" (as Ruts D.C.)	―
"—" denotes releases that did not chart.

== See also ==
- List of British punk bands
- List of Peel sessions
- List of performers on Top of the Pops
- Music of the United Kingdom (1970s)
