= Grin & Bear It =

Compilation album by The Ruts
- Released: December 1980
- Genre: Punk rock
- Label: Virgin
- Producer: The Ruts, Tony Wilson

The Ruts chronology
| The Crack (1979) | Grin & Bear It (1980) | Animal Now as Ruts DC (1981) |

Professional ratings
Review scores
| Source | Rating |
|---|---|
| Allmusic | 3/5 stars |

Grin & Bear It is The Ruts' 1980 second album and features a compilation of singles, B-sides and live performances recorded for French TV show ‘Chorus’.The cover artwork was by Oliver Howard.

"In a Rut" and "H Eyes" were from the Ruts' first single which was recorded at Fairdeal 8-track studio in Hayes in May 1978. Originally, this was to be released as an EP with a considerably slower version of "Society" on Misty in Roots' own label People Unite.

"Staring at the Rude Boys" and its B-side, "Love in Vain", were produced and engineered (for Dukeslodge Enterprises) at Air and Townhouse Studios, February 1980. Brass was added later.

"Demolition Dancing" and "Secret Soldiers" are taken from the John Peel radio session recorded in February 1980.

"S.U.S.", "Babylon’s Burning" and "Society" were recorded live in January 1980 and mixed live onto 2-track with no overdubs.

The track "S.U.S." was an attack on a 1970s UK law under which the police were able to stop people on the street and arrest them ‘on suspicion’ of causing (or being about to commit) a crime. This came to be known as the "Sus law", and was widely regarded in some areas as being used as a justification by the police for the harassment of the young and racial minorities. The law was eventually repealed.

The cassette version of this album claims that the live material was recorded "live for Chorus in Paris 7 January 1980".

"Staring at the Rude Boys" was covered by U.S. hardcore band Dag Nasty in 1987 and by English hardcore punk band Gallows in 2007.

== Track listing ==
All tracks are written by The Ruts; except where indicated

| No. | Title | Writer(s) | Length |
|---|---|---|---|
| 1. | "West One (Shine on Me)" | | 5:41 |
| 2. | "Staring at the Rude Boys" | | 3:14 |
| 3. | "Demolition Dancing" | | 2:37 |
| 4. | "Secret Soldiers" | | 2:19 |
| 5. | "H Eyes" | | 2:49 |
| 6. | "In a Rut" | | 3:41 |
| 7. | "Love in Vain" | | 4:09 |
| 8. | "S.U.S." | The Ruts, Richard Mannah | 3:29 |
| 9. | "Babylon's Burning" | | 2:42 |
| 10. | "Society" | | 2:04 |

CD bonus tracks
| No. | Title | Writer(s) | Length |
|---|---|---|---|
| 11. | "West One" (7" Version) | | 2:57 |
| 12. | "The Crack" | | 5:48 |
| 13. | "Denial" | | 3:05 |
| 14. | "Stepping Bondage" | | 2:36 |
| 15. | "Lobotomy" | Malcolm Owen, Paul Fox | 2:10 |
| 16. | "Rich Bitch" | Malcolm Owen, Paul Fox, Dave Ruffy | 2:02 |

== Personnel ==
The Ruts

- Malcolm Owen - vocals
- Paul Fox - guitar
- John "Segs" Jennings - bass
- Dave Ruffy - drums; bass on "Lobotomy" and "Rich Bitch"

with:

- Gary Barnacle - saxophone on "West One (Shine On Me)" and "Love in Vain"
- Bill Barnacle - trumpet on "Love in Vain"
- Bill Barnacle's Horns - brass on "Love in Vain"
- Paul Mattock - drums on "Lobotomy" and "Rich Bitch"
