= Tradition (band) =

Reggae band

- Origin: Brent, London, England
- Genres: Reggae
- Years active: 1976–1983, 2000s
- Labels: RCA; Venture
- Spinoffs: Reloaded
- Members: Les McNeil; Paul Thompson; Chris Henry; Paul Dawkins; Tony Matthews
- Past members: Michael Johnson; Shakeel Khan

Tradition are a United Kingdom-based reggae band. They enjoyed success with UK reggae audiences in the late 1970s, and were signed by RCA Records. They split up in 1983 but reformed over twenty years later.

== History ==
Tradition formed in Brent, North West London in 1976, initially as Special Brew. The original line-up comprised Chris "Buff Head" Henry (bass guitar), Paul "Echo" Thompson (keyboards, vocals), Tony "Drummie" Matthews (drums), Michael Johnson (guitar), and Grace Reed (vocals). Reed and Johnson left early in the band's history, to be replaced by Les McNeil and Paul Dawkins (bass). In 1977 the band signed to Venture Records, and released early singles including "Moving On", "Rastafari", and "Summertime". They were also one of the headline acts on the Anti-Nazi League's 'Rock Against Racism' tour.

In 1978 they released a discomix 12-inch single of "Why Why". The band built a reputation through their live performances, backing singers such as Alton Ellis, Delroy Wilson, Honey Boy, and Culture, and were also used as a studio band by producer David Tyrone. They won the Best Single award from Echoes in 1978 for "Breezin'", and they signed a short-lived deal with RCA Records the same year. Dawkins left to pursue a solo career in 1979 and was replaced by Shakeel Khan. As members continued to leave the band, the swansong 1982 album Spirit of Ecstasy relied heavily on Thompson's keyboard-playing. McNeil also pursued a solo career.

In the 2000s, Thompson and McNeil formed a new band, Reloaded, and in the late 2000s, Tradition reformed.

== Album discography ==
- Tradition in Dub/High Risk Dub (1977), BPI
- Moving On (1978), RCA/Venture
- Alternative Routes (1978), RCA
- Tell Your Friends About Dub (1978), RCA
- Captain Ganja & The Space Patrol (1980), Venture
- Runaway Love (1980), RCA
- Tradition's Party Disco Episode 1&2 (198?), Venture
- Spirit of Ecstasy (1982), Solid Groove – Tradition featuring Paul Thompson
