= Positive Noise =

Scottish new wave band

- L-R: Graham Middleton, Fraser Middleton, Les Gaff, Russell Blackstock (circa 1982)

Background information
- Origin: Glasgow, Scotland
- Genre: New wave
- Years active: 1979–1985
- Label: Statik
- Past members: Ross Middleton; Graham Middleton; Russell Blackstock; Fraser Middleton; Les Gaff; John Telford; John Coletta

Positive Noise were a new wave and synth-pop band from Scotland who had a number of indie hits in the 1980s. They released three albums and several singles and were together for over five years.

== History ==
The band was formed in 1979 by Ross Middleton (vocals), his brothers Graham Middleton (keyboards, vocals) and Fraser Middleton (bass guitar, vocals), Russell Blackstock (guitar, vocals), and Les Gaff (drums). Their first released material were two tracks ("Refugees" and "The Long March") on the Statik label compilation EP Second City Statik in 1980, and they followed this with two singles on Statik in 1981, both of which were top-ten hits on the UK Independent Chart. Début album Heart of Darkness was released in May 1981, after which Ross left to form the short-lived Leisure Process, with Blackstock taking over on lead vocals. Heart of Darkness peaked at number four on the independent chart, and the band's second album, Change of Heart (1982), also charted, reaching number 21. They released a third and final album, Distant Fires, in 1985, now with John Telford on drums and John Coletta on guitar, but their earlier success was not repeated and they split up shortly afterwards.

Ross Middleton had earlier worked as a music journalist, writing for Sounds under the pen name Maxwell Park.

== Discography ==
All releases on Statik Records.

=== Albums ===
- Heart of Darkness (1981) - came with a bonus 7-inch single: "Love Like Property"
- Change of Heart (1982)
- Distant Fires (1985)

=== Singles ===
- "Give Me Passion" (1981)
- "Charm" (1981)
- "Positive Negative" (1981)
- "Waiting for the Seventh Man" (1982)
- "Get Up and Go" (1982)
- "When Lightning Strikes" (1983)
- "A Million Miles Away" (1984)
- "Distant Fires" (1985)

=== Compilation appearances ===
- Second City Statik (1980), Statik: "Refugees", "The Long March"
- Cabaret Futura - Fools Rush in Where Angels Dare to Tread (1981), Martyrwell Music: "Love Like Property (Live)", "Treachery (Live)"
