= Leisure Process =

Background information
- Origin: United Kingdom
- Genres: New wave
- Years active: 1982–1983
- Labels: Epic
- Past members: Ross Middleton; Gary Barnacle

Leisure Process were a British new wave duo formed in the early 1980s. They consisted of Ross Middleton, previously of Glasgow post-punk band Positive Noise, and session sax player Gary Barnacle. Four singles were released (one credited to 'Leisure Process International') before their split. They were signed to Epic Records and all singles were produced by Martin Rushent. They recorded a session for John Peel on 10 March 1982.

== Singles ==
Leisure Process released four singles on the Epic label:

- "Love Cascade" (1982)
- "A Way You'll Never Be" (1982) (featuring Mark King and Phil Gould of Level 42)
- "Cashflow" (1982) (featuring backing vocals by the G-Spots, Karen Howarth and Karen Concannon)
- "Anxiety" (1983)
