= Paul Fox (musician) =

British musical artist (1951–2007)

- Born: 11 April 1951; Bermondsey, London, England
- Died: 21 October 2007 (aged 56)
- Occupation: Musician
- Formerly of: The Ruts

Paul Richard Fox (11 April 1951, Bermondsey, South East London – 21 October 2007) was a British singer and guitarist, best known from his work with the UK punk band, The Ruts. The Ruts' style combined punk with dub reggae, a sound that owed much to Fox's guitar skills and earned him respect and admiration. The Guardian noted in his obituary: "Fox played a pivotal songwriting role, and quickly became a model punk guitarist at a time when the three-chord thrash was the height of many of his contemporaries' ambitions". Unlike many of his peers, Fox had been playing guitar since the mid-1960s, citing Hendrix as an influence.

Fox was a founder member of the Ruts. When the original lead singer Malcolm Owen died of a heroin overdose the band continued with bassist Segs Jennings on vocals, with Fox making the occasional contribution, renaming themselves Ruts DC. They recorded one album for Virgin, followed by ground-breaking Dub LP for Bohemian, before splitting in 1983. After the break-up of the band, Fox joined a London rock band Dirty Strangers, who recorded two albums, on which the Rolling Stones guitarists, Keith Richards and Ron Wood, both guested. He went on to form Choir Militia, in 1983. This band soon folded after which he worked with Screaming Lobsters in 1987 and Fluffy Kittens from 1991 to 1994, retaining hard-core fan interest. In 1996, Fox played on a track for Mat Sargent's charity album Sex Drugs and HIV, on the song, "Heroin", which also featured; Pauline Black – The Selecter on vocals, Tony Barber – Buzzcocks on bass, Dave Parsons – Sham 69 on second guitar and Pete Davis – UK Subs on drums. From this point on his musical career was combined with carpentry, but he cut singles with the Chelsea Punk Rock Allstars in 1997, and Laurel Aitken in 2000.

Fox appeared as occasional guest guitarist with London-based ska band The Riffs (Mark Clements, Dave Fisk, Andy Gillard, Spencer Taylor, Duane Matthews) at various shows in the south-east and at a few festivals. He appeared with the band at London's Club Ska in 2005 performing a number of tracks, of which a cover of The Ruts' "Jah War" and a song with Jamaican reggae singer Winston 'Mr Fix-it' Francis appeared on the album; The Riffs – Live at Club Ska (Moonska Records). Fox also appeared later that year with members of The Riffs, his son Lawrence and Geno Blue of the Chelsea Punk Rock Allstars as The Ruts / Riffs Allstars at a memorial concert for the late Laurel Aitken in Leicester, performing a short set of Ruts, Riffs and Aitken numbers.

Fox revived The Ruts name and songs in 2006, touring with a line-up known as Foxy's Ruts, featuring his son Lawrence on drums. Fox died of lung cancer in October 2007. Three months before his death, on 16 July 2007, Fox headlined a concert in his own honour, teaming up for one final performance with his surviving bandmates David Ruffy, John "Segs" Jennings and longtime Ruts' fan, Henry Rollins, filling in for the original Ruts' singer, Malcolm Owen.

== See also ==
- List of 1970s punk rock musicians
