= Visage discography =

- Studio albums: 5
- Extended plays: 1
- Live albums: 1
- Compilation albums: 8
- Singles: 19
- Video albums: 1
- Music videos: 13
- Remix albums: 4

The discography of the British new wave band Visage consists of five studio albums, eight compilation albums, one EP and nineteen singles. Formed in 1978, the band released their first single "Tar" on the short-lived Radar Records label in 1979, before signing to Polydor Records in 1980. Their second single, "Fade To Grey", was released soon afterwards and became an international hit. After three studio albums and several personnel changes, the group disbanded in 1985 though a new line-up emerged in the 2000s, again led by vocalist Steve Strange. In 2013, the band released a new album, Hearts and Knives, the first new Visage album for 29 years. The following year, the band released Orchestral, a partly live album featuring various classic Visage songs remade with a symphony orchestra. The band's final studio album, Demons to Diamonds, was released in November 2015 (released posthumously following Strange's death in February that year).

== Albums ==
=== Studio albums ===
Title	Album details	Peak chart positions								Certifications
Title	Album details	UK	AUS	AUT	FIN	GER	NZ	SWE	US	Certifications
Visage	Released: 14 November 1980; Label: Polydor; Formats: LP, MC	13	17	11	—	1	14	22	178	UK: Silver; GER: Gold
The Anvil	Released: 26 March 1982; Label: Polydor; Formats: LP, MC	6	—	—	25	41	38	33	—	UK: Silver
Beat Boy	Released: 26 October 1984; Label: Polydor; Formats: LP, MC	79	—	—	—	—	—	—	—	
Hearts and Knives	Released: 20 May 2013; Label: Blitz Club; Formats: CD, LP, digital download	—	—	—	—	—	—	—	—	
Demons to Diamonds	Released: 6 November 2015; Label: August Day; Formats: CD, LP, digital download	—	—	—	—	—	—	—	—	
"—" denotes releases that did not chart or were not released in that territory.

=== Live albums ===
Title	Album details	Notes
Orchestral	Released: 8 December 2014; Label: August Day; Formats: CD, digital download	A (partly) live album of eleven Visage songs (and one new track) recorded with the Czech Synthosymphonica Orchestra and the Prague Symphony Orchestra

=== Remix albums ===
Title	Album details	Notes
Fade to Grey: The Singles Collection (Special Dance Mix)	Released: 11 November 1983 (Special Dance Mix Cassette); Released: 17 February 1984 (Special Limited Edition Dance Mix Album); Label: Polydor; Formats: MC/LP/CD	Initially only available on cassette and "Special Dance Mix Promotional Album" vinyl to DJs, with the "Special Limited Edition Dance Mix Album" subsequently released on 17 February 1984. Released on CD by Rubellan Remasters (US) on 31 January 2020.
Beat Boy (Special Cassette Remix)	Released: 26 October 1984; Label: Polydor; Formats: MC/CD	Remix of the Beat Boy album, originally only available on cassette. Released on CD by Rubellan Remasters (US) on 18 February 2022.
Darkness to Diamond	Released: 8 January 2016; Label: August Day; Formats: CD, digital download	Companion album to Demons to Diamonds, containing remixes, extended versions and alternate versions
The Wild Life – The Best of Extended Versions and Remixes 1978 to 2015	Released: 20 January 2017; Label: Steve Strange Collective; Formats: CD, 2xLP	A companion album to The Wild Life compilation featuring newly recorded 12" versions and remixes of tracks from throughout the band's history. Not the original 12" mixes, but re-recorded versions by Visage's final incarnation.

=== Compilation albums ===
Title	Album details	Peak chart positions	Certifications
Title	Album details	UK	Certifications
Fade to Grey: The Singles Collection	Released: 11 November 1983; Label: Polydor; Formats: LP, MC	38	UK: Gold
Fade to Grey: The Best of Visage (Note: Fade to Grey: The Best of Visage is in fact a re-release of Fade to Grey: The Singles Collection with two extra tracks and a new catalogue number.)	Released: 8 November 1993; Label: Polydor; Formats: CD, MC	—	
Master Series	Released: September 1997; Label: Polydor; Formats: CD	—	
The Damned Don't Cry	Released: 23 October 2000; Label: Spectrum Music; Formats: CD	—	
The Face – The Very Best of Visage	Released: 8 March 2010; Label: Polydor; Formats: CD	—	
Fade to Grey – The Best of Visage	Released: 1 July 2013; Label: Spectrum Music; Formats: CD	—	
The Wild Life – The Best of 1978–2015	Released: 12 December 2016; Label: Steve Strange Collective; Formats: CD, MC, digital download	—	
The Wild Life	Released: 12 December 2016; Label: Steve Strange Collective; Formats: 6xCD	—	
"—" denotes releases that did not chart.

== EPs ==
Title	EP details
Visage	Released: 6 July 1981; Label: Polydor; Formats: 12", MC; US and Canada-only release

== Singles ==
Title	Year	Peak chart positions										Certifications	Album
Title	Year	UK	AUS	AUT	BEL (FL)	GER	IRE	NL	NZ	SWE	SWI	Certifications	Album
"Tar"	1979	—	—	—	—	—	—	—	—	—	—		Visage
"Fade to Grey"	1980	8	6	3	4	1	7	24	10	12	1	UK: Silver; GER: Gold	Visage
"Mind of a Toy"	1981	13	—	—	—	10	16	42	—	—	—		Visage
"Visage"	1981	21	—	—	—	41	—	—	—	—	—		Visage
"Moon Over Moscow" (Note: "Moon Over Moscow" and "Whispers" were only released as singles in Japan.)	1981	—	—	—	—	—	—	—	—	—	—		Visage
"The Damned Don't Cry"	1982	11	94	—	—	39	22	—	—	—	—		The Anvil
"Night Train"	1982	12	—	—	—	—	—	—	—	—	—		The Anvil
"Whispers"	1982	—	—	—	—	—	—	—	—	—	—		The Anvil
"Pleasure Boys"	1982	44	—	—	—	—	—	—	—	—	—		Fade to Grey: The Singles Collection
"Love Glove"	1984	54	—	—	—	—	—	—	—	—	—		Beat Boy
"Beat Boy"	1984	—	—	—	—	—	—	—	—	—	—		Beat Boy
"Fade to Grey" (Bassheads '93 remix)	1993	39	—	—	—	—	—	—	—	—	—		Fade to Grey: The Best of Visage
"Shameless Fashion"	2013	—	—	—	—	—	—	—	—	—	—		Hearts and Knives
"Dreamer I Know"	2013	—	—	—	—	—	—	—	—	—	—		Hearts and Knives
"Never Enough"	2013	—	—	—	—	—	—	—	—	—	—		Hearts and Knives
"Hidden Sign"	2014	—	—	—	—	—	—	—	—	—	—		Hearts and Knives
"She's Electric (Coming Around)"	2014	—	—	—	—	—	—	—	—	—	—		Hearts and Knives
"Fade to Grey" (Orchestral)	2014	—	—	—	—	—	—	—	—	—	—		Orchestral
"Lost in Static"	2015	—	—	—	—	—	—	—	—	—	—		Hearts and Knives
"—" denotes releases that did not chart or were not released in that territory.

=== Promotional singles ===
Title	Year	Album
"The Anvil" / "Der Amboss" (Note: A remix of "The Anvil" was released as the B-side of the "Pleasure Boys" single, but became a popular dancefloor track in 1982. A single-sided 7" single was pressed (believed to be either a promo or a test pressing, as it had the same catalogue number as "Pleasure Boys" (POSP 523), and a German-language version, "Der Amboss", was released as a 12" promo (POSPV 523).)	1982	The Anvil
"Can You Hear Me"	1984	Beat Boy
"Casualty" (Note: There is debate over the actual validity of these promotional releases, as they may be counterfeit.)	1984	Beat Boy
"Questions"	1984	Beat Boy

== Videos ==
=== Video albums ===
Title	Album details
Visage	Released: 1 August 1985; Label: Channel 5; Formats: VHS, LD

=== Music videos ===
Title	Year	Director
"Fade to Grey"	1980	Godley & Creme
"Mind of a Toy"	1981	Godley & Creme
"Visage"	1981	Midge Ure
"The Damned Don't Cry"	1982	Midge Ure
"Night Train"	1982	Jean-Claude Luyat
"Pleasure Boys"	1982	Tim Pope
"Love Glove"	1984	Nick Morris
"The Horseman"	1985	Jean-Claude Luyat
"Yesterday's Shadow"	1985	Jean-Claude Luyat
"Love Glove"	1985	Jean-Claude Luyat
"Wild Life"	1985	Jean-Claude Luyat
"Beat Boy"	1985	Jean-Claude Luyat
"Dreamer I Know"	2013	Armando
