= Fade to Grey: The Singles Collection =

- Original 1983 cover art

Compilation album by Visage
- Released: 11 November 1983
- Genre: Synth-pop
- Label: Polydor
- Producer: Midge Ure, Visage

Visage chronology
The Anvil (1982)	Fade to Grey: The Singles Collection (1983)	Beat Boy (1984)

Alternative cover
- The Best of Visage (1993 re-release)

Professional ratings
Review scores
Source	Rating
AllMusic	4.5/5 stars

Fade to Grey: The Singles Collection is a 1983 compilation album by the British synth-pop group Visage.

== Background ==
Released as a stop-gap between studio albums whilst the band was experiencing contractual difficulties, the compilation includes all of the Visage singles released up to that point (five of them UK Top 30 hits), the majority taken from their first two albums Visage (1980) and The Anvil (1982), as well as a couple of non-single tracks. The cassette version was released as a "Special Dance Mix Cassette", featuring remixes as well as a bonus track, "Der Amboss" (a German-language version of the song "The Anvil"). This version was also made available as a "Special Dance Mix Promotional Album" on vinyl, with a "Special Limited Edition Dance Mix Album" subsequently released on 17 February 1984, which included a red border around the edge of the front cover instead of light blue, as on the standard edition of the album.

In British HMV stores, a limited number of copies of the album and cassette were issued with a free 7" vinyl picture disc of the "Pleasure Boys" single from 1982. The album reached No. 38 on the UK Albums Chart and was certified Gold by the British Phonographic Industry, based on pre-release sales to shops.

The album was re-released a decade later on 8 November 1993 as Fade to Grey – The Best of Visage with a similar cover and tracklisting but with the inclusion of two tracks not featured on the original release: "Love Glove" (Visage's penultimate single), from the album Beat Boy (1984), and the Bassheads/Andy Stevenson remix of "Fade to Grey", which became a minor Top 40 hit again in 1993. The only single not included on this compilation was "Beat Boy", the band's final single from 1984.

The Special Dance Mix version of the album was released on CD for the first time on 31 January 2020 by Rubellan Remasters. The CD features all of the tracks originally included on the original 1983 cassette version (many of them still in their non-stop "hit mix" form) along with several bonus tracks.

== Track listing ==
=== Standard version ===
Original 1983 release
No.	Title	Writer(s)	Origin	Length
1.	"Fade to Grey"	Billy Currie; Midge Ure; Chris Payne	Visage	4:00
2.	"Mind of a Toy"	Steve Strange; Ure; Currie; John McGeoch; Rusty Egan; Dave Formula	Visage	3:32
3.	"Visage"	Strange; Ure; Currie; McGeoch; Egan; Formula	Visage	3:53
4.	"We Move" (remix)	Strange; Ure; Currie; McGeoch; Egan; Formula	B-side to "Mind of a Toy"	3:45
5.	"Tar"	Strange; Ure; Currie; McGeoch; Egan; Formula; Barry Adamson	Visage	3:32
6.	"In the Year 2525"	Rick Evans	Previously unreleased	3:45
7.	"The Anvil" (single remix by John Luongo)	Strange; Ure; Currie; McGeoch; Egan; Formula	B-side of "Pleasure Boys"	4:26
8.	"Night Train" (album version edit)	Strange; Ure; Currie; McGeoch; Egan; Formula	The Anvil	3:58
9.	"Pleasure Boys"	Strange; Currie; McGeoch; Egan; Formula; Steve Barnacle	Non-album single	3:35
10.	"The Damned Don't Cry"	Strange; Ure; Currie; McGeoch; Egan; Formula	The Anvil	4:02

1993 re-release bonus tracks
No.	Title	Writer(s)	Origin	Length
11.	"Love Glove"	Strange; Egan; Barnacle	Beat Boy	4:00
12.	"Fade to Grey" (Bassheads 7" edit)	Currie; Ure; Payne	Previously unreleased	3:22

=== Special Dance Mix versions ===
1983 Special Dance Mix Cassette
Side one:

1. "Fade to Grey" (12" Dance Mix) – 6:20
2. "Mind of a Toy" (12" Dance Mix) – 5:10
3. "Visage" (12" Dance Mix) – 5:31
4. "We Move" (remix) – 3:32
5. "Tar" – 3.30
6. "Der Amboss" (edit) – 4:34

Side two:

7. "In the Year 2525" – 3:42
8. "The Anvil" (special remix for this album) – 5:01
9. "Night Train" (special remix for this album) – 6:20
10. "Pleasure Boys" – 3:33
11. "Damned Don't Cry" (12" Dance Mix) – 5:40

(Timings are approximate, as the cassette release was produced as a non-stop "hit mix" in which some tracks fade into each other.)

2020 Rubellan Remasters Special Dance Mix CD

1. "Fade to Grey" – 6:22
2. "Mind of a Toy" – 5:11
3. "Visage" – 5:33
4. "We Move" (Remix) – 3:34
5. "Tar" – 3:28
6. "In the Year 2525" – 3:40
7. "The Anvil" – 4:57
8. "Night Train" – 6:24
9. "Pleasure Boys" – 3:27
10. "The Damned Don't Cry" – 5:37
11. "Frequency 7" – 3:05
12. "Night Train" (7" Remix) – 3:42
13. "Der Amboss" – 4:37
14. "Pleasure Boys" (Bonus Beats) – 5:50
15. "Night Train" (Dub Mix) – 5:03

== Charts ==
Chart performance for Fade to Grey: The Singles Collection
Chart (1983)	Peak position
UK Albums (OCC)	38

== Certifications ==
Certifications for Fade to Grey: The Singles Collection
Region	Certification	Certified units/sales
United Kingdom (BPI)	Gold	100,000^{^}
^{^} Shipments figures based on certification alone.
