= Night Train (Visage song) =

Single by Visage

from the album The Anvil
- B-side: "I'm Still Searching"
- Released: 18 June 1982
- Recorded: Mayfair Studios, 1981
- Genre: Electronic
- Length: 3:39
- Label: Polydor
- Songwriters: Steve Strange, Midge Ure, Billy Currie, Rusty Egan, Dave Formula
- Producers: Midge Ure, Visage

Visage singles chronology
"The Damned Don't Cry" (1982)	"Night Train" (1982)	"Pleasure Boys" (1982)

Alternative single cover
- Japanese release

"Night Train" is the sixth single by the British synth-pop group Visage, released by Polydor Records on 18 June 1982.

== Background ==
The song was the second single from the band's album The Anvil. It was remixed for the single release with the assistance of John Luongo, and also available as a limited edition picture disc.

The B-side of the single is a non-album track, "I'm Still Searching". This song was not available on any digital format until 2008 when a re-issue of The Anvil was released by Cherry Red Records.

"Night Train" and "Whispers" (another track from The Anvil), were used in Japanese adverts for TDK tapes in 1982. "Night Train" peaked at number 12 in the UK and was the band's final UK Top 40 hit until a remix of their first hit "Fade to Grey" was released in 1993.

The "Night Train" promo video was directed by Jean-Claude Luyat and it features Francesca von Habsburg (who was Steve Strange's girlfriend at the time, as a backing vocalist, although she didn't perform on the actual record) and French actress Eva Ionesco.

== Track listing ==
- 7" single (1982)

A. "Night Train" – 3:39
B. "I'm Still Searching" – 3:37

- 12" single (1982)

A. "Night Train" (Dance Mix) – 6:07
B1. "Night Train" (Dub Mix) – 5:02
B2. "I'm Still Searching" – 3:38

== Personnel ==
- Steve Strange — vocals
- Midge Ure — synthesizer
- Billy Currie — synthesizer
- Rusty Egan — drums
- Dave Formula — synthesizer
- Barry Adamson — bass
- Gary Barnacle — saxophone
- Perri Lister — backing vocals
- Lorraine Whitmarsh— backing vocals

== Chart performance ==
Chart	Peak position
United Kingdom	12
