= Pleasure Boys =

Single by Visage

from the album Fade to Grey – The Singles Collection
- B-side: "The Anvil"
- Released: 29 October 1982
- Recorded: Trident Studios, 1982
- Genre: Synth-pop; new wave
- Length: 3:35
- Label: Polydor
- Songwriters: Steve Strange, Rusty Egan, Billy Currie, Dave Formula, Steve Barnacle
- Producer: Visage

Visage singles chronology
"Night Train" (1982)	"Pleasure Boys" (1982)	"Love Glove" (1984)

12" single cover

"Pleasure Boys" is a song by the British synth-pop group Visage, released as a single by Polydor Records on 29 October 1982.

== Background ==
Initially a non-album single, "Pleasure Boys" was included on the Fade to Grey – The Singles Collection compilation album in 1983. As well as the standard 7" and 12" formats, the single was also released as a limited edition 7" picture disc. It was the first release by Visage after the departure of Midge Ure, who had left the group due to creative differences with Steve Strange and also to concentrate on his role in Ultravox. Possibly due to Ure's absence, "Pleasure Boys" was the first Visage single to miss the UK Top 40 after a string of five hits during the 1981-82 period.

== Music video ==
The music video for "Pleasure Boys" was directed by Tim Pope. The black and white clip pictures Steve Strange recreating Marlon Brando's look from his 1953 film The Wild One, riding a Harley-Davidson motorbike. The clip was included on band's 1986 video release, Visage.

== Track listing ==
- 7" single (1982)

A. "Pleasure Boys" – 3:34
B. "The Anvil" – 4:26

- 12" single (1982)

A. "Pleasure Boys" (Dance Mix) – 6:58
B. "The Anvil" (Dance Mix) – 6:14

== Personnel ==
- Steve Strange — vocals
- Rusty Egan — electronic drums programming
- Billy Currie — synthesizer
- Dave Formula — synthesizer
- Steve Barnacle — bass

== Chart performance ==
Chart	Peak position
United Kingdom	44
