= Strange Cruise (album) =

Studio album by Strange Cruise
- Released: August 1986
- Recorded: 1985–1986
- Genre: Pop rock
- Label: EMI
- Producer: Mike Hedges, Simon Hanhart, Steve Forward

Singles from Strange Cruise
- 1. "Rebel Blue Rocker" Released: February 1986; 2. "The Beat Goes On" Released: 1986

Professional ratings
Review scores
Source	Rating
Allmusic	1.5/5 stars

Strange Cruise is the eponymously titled album by the short-lived British band Strange Cruise released on EMI. Released in 1986, it was the band's only album.

== Background ==
After Visage disbanded in 1985, vocalist Steve Strange put a new band together the same year. The recording of the album took place in late 1985 in Germany, in a studio near Nuremberg. Mike Hedges produced the album, with contributions from Simon Hanhart and Steve Forward.

The album was a commercial disappointment, failing to enter the chart. Two singles taken off the album, "Rebel Blue Rocker" and a cover of Sonny & Cher's "The Beat Goes On", were also unsuccessful. There was also a B-side called Silver Screen Queen.

== Track listing ==
All tracks written by Steve Strange and Steve Barnacle, except from "The Beat Goes On", written by Sonny Bono, and "12 Miles High", written by Steve New.

1. "Hit and Run" – 3:06
2. "The Beat Goes On" – 3:26
3. "Rebel Blue Rocker" – 3:15
4. "Communication (Breaking Down the Walls)" – 4:00
5. "This Old Town" – 3:15
6. "Animal Call" – 2:54
7. "Heart Is a Lonely Hunter" – 3:44
8. "Love Addiction" – 2:55
9. "12 Miles High" – 2:50
10. "Where Were Their Hearts" – 3:44

== Personnel ==
- Steve Strange - vocals
- Wendy Wu - vocals (credited as Wendy Cruise)
- Frankie Hepburn - guitar, backing vocals
- Steve Barnacle - bass guitar, backing vocals
- Pete Barnacle - drums, backing vocals
- Pete Murray - synthesizer, backing vocals

== Additional Musicians ==
- Gary Barnacle - saxophone
- Pete Thoms - trombone
- Luke Tunney - trumpet
- Martin Ditcham - percussion
