= The Photons =

UK musical group

- Origin: London, England
- Genres: Punk rock; new wave
- Years active: 1977–1978
- Past members: Steve Strange; The Kid; Vince Ely; David Littler

The Photons was a punk/new wave band active between 1977 and 1978. They are most notable for their vocalist Steve Strange, who went on to form Visage. Two of Visage's early singles, "Tar" and "Mind of a Toy", were originally Photons' songs.

Other notable members include Mark Ryan, Vince Ely who later joined the Psychedelic Furs and David Littler, formerly of the Spitfire Boys.

Between December 1977 and January 1978, the Photons and the Moors Murderers, another one of Steve Strange's projects, had an overlapping membership, with frequent personnel swaps between the two.
