= The Damned Don't Cry (song) =

Single by Visage

from the album The Anvil
- B-side: "Motivation"
- Released: 5 March 1982
- Recorded: Mayfair Studios, 1981
- Genre: Electropop
- Length: 3:52
- Label: Polydor
- Songwriters: Steve Strange, Midge Ure, Billy Currie, Rusty Egan, Dave Formula
- Producers: Midge Ure, Visage

Visage singles chronology
"Visage" (1981)	"The Damned Don't Cry" (1982)	"Night Train" (1982)

12" single cover

"The Damned Don't Cry" is a song by British synth-pop group Visage, released as a single by Polydor Records on 5 March 1982.

== Background ==
Named after the 1950 Joan Crawford film, "The Damned Don't Cry" was the first single from Visage's second album, The Anvil. The cover art of the 7" single differed from that of the 12" single. It was a chart success, becoming Visage's second-highest charting single in the UK (No. 11) and the band's last international hit.

== Music video ==
"The Damned Don't Cry" was the second Visage video directed by Midge Ure. It was shot at Tenterden Town railway station in Kent, and recreates the 1930s atmosphere and mood of the Orient Express. The clip was included on the band's 1986 video release Visage.

== Track listing ==
- 7" single (1982)
1. "The Damned Don't Cry" – 3:52
2. "Motivation" – 3:35
- 12" single (1982)
1. "The Damned Don't Cry" (Dance Mix) – 5:43
2. "Motivation" – 3:46

== Personnel ==
- Steve Strange – vocals
- Midge Ure – synthesizer
- Billy Currie – synthesizer, electric violin
- Rusty Egan – electronic drums programming
- Dave Formula – synthesizer
- Perri Lister – backing vocals
- Lorraine Whitmarsh – backing vocals

== Chart performance ==
Chart	Peak position
Germany	39
United Kingdom	11
