= Visage (song) =

- Cover variant by Brian Griffin

Single by Visage

from the album Visage
- B-side: "Second Steps"
- Released: 3 July 1981
- Recorded: Genetic Studios, 1980
- Genre: Synth-pop; new wave
- Length: 3:51
- Label: Polydor
- Songwriters: Steve Strange, Midge Ure, Billy Currie, John McGeoch, Rusty Egan, Dave Formula
- Producers: Midge Ure, Visage

Visage singles chronology
"Mind of a Toy" (1981)	"Visage" (1981)	"The Damned Don't Cry" (1982)

Alternative single cover
- Cover variant by Robyn Beeche

"Visage" is the fourth single by the British synth-pop group Visage, released by Polydor Records on 3 July 1981. It is the title track from Visage's eponymous debut album. The single peaked at no.21 in the UK Singles Chart.

== Cover and music video ==
Cover variant by John Timbers

In the UK, the single was available in three different covers, each featuring vocalist Steve Strange, by photographers John Timbers, Robyn Beeche and Brian Griffin.

The music video for the single was the first of two Visage videos directed by Midge Ure. The video includes footage shot at the Blitz nightclub in London's Covent Garden, which was the focal point of the New Romantic scene in the early 1980s. It was included on the Visage video album in 1986. A then-unknown Jacquie O'Sullivan (who would join Bananarama in the late 80's) appears briefly at the beginning of the video as one of The Blitz's customers on the bar counter.

== Track listing ==
- 7" single (1981)

A. "Visage" – 3:51
B. "Second Steps" – 5:00

- 12" single (1981)

A. "Visage" (Dance Mix) – 6:01
B. "Second Steps" – 5:30

== Personnel ==
- Steve Strange – vocals
- Midge Ure – guitar
- Billy Currie – synthesizer, electric violin
- John McGeoch – guitar
- Rusty Egan – drums, electronic drums programming
- Barry Adamson – bass
- Dave Formula – synthesizer

== Chart performance ==
Chart	Peak position
Germany	41
Ireland	22
United Kingdom	21
