= Strange Cruise =

English pop rock band

- Genre: Pop rock
- Years active: 1985–1986
- Label: EMI
- Past members: Steve Strange; Wendy Cruise; Steve New; Pete Barnacle; Gary Barnacle; Steve Barnacle; Pete Murray; Frankie Hepburn

Strange Cruise was a short-lived 1980s British pop rock group, fronted by former Visage singer Steve Strange and Wendy Cruise (aka Wendy Wu, the former singer of the Photos). The band released only one, self-titled album in 1986.

== History ==
After the flop of the third Visage album, Beat Boy, and while temporarily staying off heroin after rehab, Steve Strange formed a new band. Strange Cruise, contrarily to Visage, was expected to be a live touring band, initially involving Pete, Gary and Steve Barnacle (all of whom had worked with Visage), as well as Steve New. In a 1985 interview for the West German TV show Musikladen, Steve Strange stated that model Leza Cruz was also a singer and member of the band and that their first single would be a cover of Sonny & Cher's "The Beat Goes On". Cruz, a model and muse for Jean-Paul Gaultier at the time, did not end up recording with the band, and Wendy Cruise (aka Wendy Wu) sang the vocals with Strange.

The band went to Germany to record an album with Mike Hedges. The lead single, "Rebel Blue Rocker", was released in February 1986, but Strange claimed that their record company EMI failed to promote it, and it was commercially unsuccessful. The group's album, Strange Cruise, as well as the second single, "The Beat Goes On", were also unsuccessful, and the group disbanded.

== Discography ==
=== Albums ===
- 1986: Strange Cruise

=== Singles ===
- 1986: "Rebel Blue Rocker"
- 1986: "The Beat Goes On"
