= List of number-one hits of 1981 (Germany) =

This is a list of the German Media Control Top100 Singles Chart number-ones of 1981.

Key
| † | Indicates best-performing single and album of 1981 |

| Issue date | Song | Artist | Album | Artist |
|---|---|---|---|---|
| 5 January | "Woman in Love" | Barbra Streisand | "Hitparade der Schlümpfe" | Die Schlümpfe |
| 12 January | "Super Trouper" | ABBA | "Hitparade der Schlümpfe" | Die Schlümpfe |
| 19 January | "Super Trouper" | ABBA | "Hitparade der Schlümpfe" | Die Schlümpfe |
| 26 January | "Super Trouper" | ABBA | "Hitparade der Schlümpfe" | Die Schlümpfe |
| 2 February | "Angel of Mine" | Frank Duval | "Hitparade der Schlümpfe" | Die Schlümpfe |
| 9 February | "Angel of Mine" | Frank Duval | "Hitparade der Schlümpfe" | Die Schlümpfe |
| 16 February | "Angel of Mine" | Frank Duval | "Hitparade der Schlümpfe" | Die Schlümpfe |
| 23 February | "Angel of Mine" | Frank Duval | "Hitparade der Schlümpfe" | Die Schlümpfe |
| 2 March | "Angel of Mine" | Frank Duval | "Hitparade der Schlümpfe" | Die Schlümpfe |
| 9 March | "Fade to Grey" | Visage | "Hey Tonight" | Creedence Clearwater Revival |
| 16 March | "Fade to Grey" | Visage | "Hitparade der Schlümpfe" | Die Schlümpfe |
| 23 March | "Fade to Grey" | Visage | "Hitparade der Schlümpfe" | Die Schlümpfe |
| 30 March | "Fade to Grey" | Visage | "Visage" | Visage |
| 6 April | "Fade to Grey" | Visage | "Die grossten erfolge" | Ernst Mosch und seine original egerlander musikanten |
| 13 April | "Fade to Grey" | Visage | "Die grossten erfolge" | Ernst Mosch und seine original egerlander musikanten |
| 20 April | "Shaddap You Face" | Joe Dolce Music Theatre | "Die grossten erfolge" | Ernst Mosch und seine original egerlander musikanten |
| 27 April | "Shaddap You Face" | Joe Dolce Music Theatre | "Die grossten erfolge" | Ernst Mosch und seine original egerlander musikanten |
| 4 May | "Fade to Grey" | Visage | "Die grossten erfolge" | Ernst Mosch und seine original egerlander musikanten |
| 11 May | "Shaddap You Face" | Joe Dolce Music Theatre | "Die Schonsten melodien der Welt" | Orchester Anthony Ventura |
| 18 May | "In the Air Tonight" | Phil Collins | "Die Schonsten melodien der Welt" | Orchester Anthony Ventura |
| 25 May | "Stars on 45 Medley (Intro 'Venus' / Sugar Sugar / No Reply / I'll Be Back / Drive My Car / Do You Want to Know a Secret / We Can Work It Out / I Should Have Known Better / Nowhere Man / You're Going to Lose That Girl / Stars on 45)" | Stars on 45 | "Die Schonsten melodien der Welt" | Orchester Anthony Ventura |
| 1 June | "Stars on 45 Medley (Intro 'Venus' / Sugar Sugar / No Reply / I'll Be Back / Drive My Car / Do You Want to Know a Secret / We Can Work It Out / I Should Have Known Better / Nowhere Man / You're Going to Lose That Girl / Stars on 45)" | Stars on 45 | "Die Schonsten melodien der Welt" | Orchester Anthony Ventura |
| 8 June | "Stars on 45 Medley (Intro 'Venus' / Sugar Sugar / No Reply / I'll Be Back / Drive My Car / Do You Want to Know a Secret / We Can Work It Out / I Should Have Known Better / Nowhere Man / You're Going to Lose That Girl / Stars on 45)" | Stars on 45 | "A wie ABBA" | ABBA |
| 15 June | "Stars on 45 Medley (Intro 'Venus' / Sugar Sugar / No Reply / I'll Be Back / Drive My Car / Do You Want to Know a Secret / We Can Work It Out / I Should Have Known Better / Nowhere Man / You're Going to Lose That Girl / Stars on 45)" | Stars on 45 | "A wie ABBA" | ABBA |
| 22 June | "Stars on 45 Medley (Intro 'Venus' / Sugar Sugar / No Reply / I'll Be Back / Drive My Car / Do You Want to Know a Secret / We Can Work It Out / I Should Have Known Better / Nowhere Man / You're Going to Lose That Girl / Stars on 45)" | Stars on 45 | "A wie ABBA" | ABBA |
| 29 June | "Stars on 45 Medley (Intro 'Venus' / Sugar Sugar / No Reply / I'll Be Back / Drive My Car / Do You Want to Know a Secret / We Can Work It Out / I Should Have Known Better / Nowhere Man / You're Going to Lose That Girl / Stars on 45)" | Stars on 45 | "A wie ABBA" | ABBA |
| 6 July | "Stars on 45 Medley (Intro 'Venus' / Sugar Sugar / No Reply / I'll Be Back / Drive My Car / Do You Want to Know a Secret / We Can Work It Out / I Should Have Known Better / Nowhere Man / You're Going to Lose That Girl / Stars on 45)" | Stars on 45 | "A wie ABBA" | ABBA |
| 13 July | "Bette Davis Eyes" | Kim Carnes | "Long Play Album" | Stars On 45 |
| 20 July | "Bette Davis Eyes" | Kim Carnes | "Long Play Album" | Stars On 45 |
| 27 July | "Bette Davis Eyes" | Kim Carnes | "Long Play Album" | Stars On 45 |
| 3 August | "Bette Davis Eyes" | Kim Carnes | "Long Play Album" | Stars On 45 |
| 10 August | "Bette Davis Eyes" | Kim Carnes | "Kim Wilde" | Kim Wilde |
| 17 August | "Bette Davis Eyes" | Kim Carnes | "Kim Wilde" | Kim Wilde |
| 24 August | "Bette Davis Eyes" | Kim Carnes | "Kim Wilde" | Kim Wilde |
| 31 August | "Dance Little Bird (Chicken Dance)" † | Electronica's | "Kim Wilde" | Kim Wilde |
| 7 September | "Dance Little Bird (Chicken Dance)" † | Electronica's | "Kim Wilde" | Kim Wilde |
| 14 September | "Dance Little Bird (Chicken Dance)" † | Electronica's | "Time" | Electric Light Orchestra |
| 21 September | "Dance Little Bird (Chicken Dance)" † | Electronica's | "Time" | Electric Light Orchestra |
| 28 September | "Dance Little Bird (Chicken Dance)" † | Electronica's | "Time" | Electric Light Orchestra |
| 5 October | "Dance Little Bird (Chicken Dance)" † | Electronica's | "Time" | Electric Light Orchestra |
| 12 October | "Dance Little Bird (Chicken Dance)" † | Electronica's | "Time" | Electric Light Orchestra |
| 19 October | "Dance Little Bird (Chicken Dance)" † | Electronica's | "Quietschfidelio" | Electronica's |
| 26 October | "Ja, wenn wir alle Englein wären" | Fred Sonnenschein und seine Freunde | "Quietschfidelio" | Electronica's |
| 2 November | "Ja, wenn wir alle Englein wären" | Fred Sonnenschein und seine Freunde | "Quietschfidelio" | Electronica's |
| 9 November | "Ja, wenn wir alle Englein wären" | Fred Sonnenschein und seine Freunde | "Dich zu lieben" | Roland Kaiser |
| 16 November | "Ja, wenn wir alle Englein wären" | Fred Sonnenschein und seine Freunde | "Quietschfidelio" | Electronica's |
| 23 November | "Tainted Love" | Soft Cell | "Quietschfidelio" | Electronica's |
| 30 November | "Tainted Love" | Soft Cell | "Greatest Hits" | Queen |
| 7 December | "Polonäse Blankenese" | Gottlieb Wendehals (a.k.a. Werner Böhm) | "Greatest Hits" | Queen |
| 14 December | "Polonäse Blankenese" | Gottlieb Wendehals (a.k.a. Werner Böhm) | "Hitparade der Schlümpfe 2" | Die Schlümpfe |
| 21 December | "Polonäse Blankenese" | Gottlieb Wendehals (a.k.a. Werner Böhm) | "Hitparade der Schlümpfe 2" | Die Schlümpfe |
| 28 December | "Polonäse Blankenese" | Gottlieb Wendehals (a.k.a. Werner Böhm) | "The Visitors" | ABBA |

== Best performing album ==
| Album | Artist(s) | Notes |
|---|---|---|
| "QE2" † | Mike Oldfield | Peaked at #12 |

== See also ==
- List of number-one hits (Germany)
