= Beat Boy (song) =

Single by Visage

from the album Beat Boy
- B-side: "Beat Boy" (Dub)
- Released: 9 November 1984
- Recorded: Trident Studios, 1983
- Genre: Synth-pop; new wave
- Length: 3:30
- Label: Polydor
- Songwriters: Steve Strange, Rusty Egan, Steve Barnacle, Dave Formula, Andy Barnett
- Producer: Visage

Visage singles chronology
"Love Glove" (1984)	"Beat Boy" (1984)	"Shameless Fashion" (2013)

"Beat Boy" is a 1984 song by the British synth-pop band Visage, released as a single on 9 November 1984.

The track was taken as the second single from Visage's third album, Beat Boy, and became the band's last single before they split up in 1985. The single was a commercial failure and did not chart.

== Music video ==
The music video was directed by Jean-Claude Luyat and shot in Africa, as a part of a full-length video incorporating songs from The Anvil and Beat Boy. It pictures dancing tribes and Steve Strange traveling across savanna. The clip was later included on the Visage video album in 1986.

== Track listings ==
- 7" single (1984)

A. "Beat Boy" – 3:30
B. "Beat Boy" (Dub) – 3:48

- 12" single (1984)

A. "Beat Boy" (Dance Mix) – 7:15
B. "Beat Boy" (Dance Dub) – 5:23

- 12" promotional single (1984)

A. "Beat Boy" (Machine Mix (10 Min) Dance Mix) – 9:54
B. "Beat Boy" ((10 Min) Dance Mix) – 8:45

== Personnel ==
- Steve Strange — vocals
- Rusty Egan — drums, electronic drums programming
- Steve Barnacle — bass
- Dave Formula — synthesizer
- Andy Barnett — guitar
- Marsha Raven — backing vocals
- Karen Ramsey — backing vocals
- Rose Patterson — backing vocals
