= St. Louis Union =

English freakbeat rock band (1966–1967)

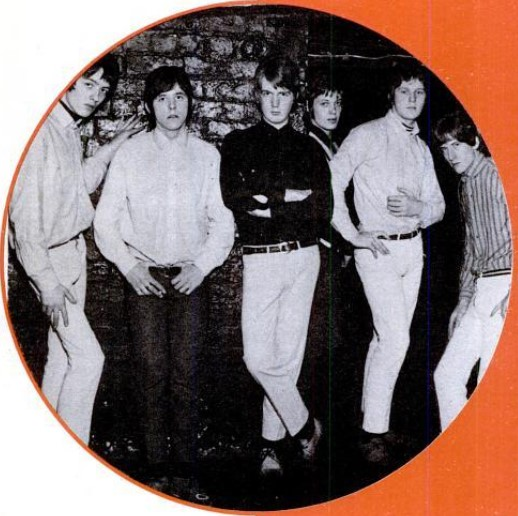

Background information
- Origin: Manchester, England
- Genres: Freakbeat
- Years active: 1966–1967
- Past members: Tony Cassidy; Keith Millar; Alex Kirby; Lenni Zaksen; Bernie Brown; David Tomlinson; John Nichols; Dave Webb

St. Louis Union were a short-lived mid-1960s English freakbeat rock band from Manchester who formed part of the mod rock scene. They were formed by singer Tony Cassidy, guitarist Keith Millar, tenor saxophone/flute player Alex Kirby, who left in late 1966 and was replaced by Lenni Zaksen and Bernie Brown, keyboardist David Tomlinson, bassist John Nichols and drummer Dave Webb.

== History ==
They formed initially as The Satanists and then, after they changed their name, they won the Melody Maker National Beat Contest, in front of a 3,700 sold-out crowd on 15 August 1965 at Wimbledon Palais, leaving a fledgling The Pink Floyd (later known simply as Pink Floyd) in a lower placing. The judges included Graham Nash of The Hollies, Kenny Everett then a Radio London DJ and Vicki Wickham of Ready Steady Go!. The band's winning prizes included a Hammond organ, a recording contract with Decca Records, an appearance on ABC TV's Lucky Stars and a complete set of outfits from Cecil Gee the London tailors. At the time their manager was Terry Smith and Kennedy St. Artists were their sole agents. As a result of their contest win they made their first TV appearance on 18 August 1965 on Granada TV's Scene at 6.30.

Their first single, a cover of the Beatles song "Girl", was released in early 1966, and was a success in the UK Singles Chart, where it reached No. 11 in February 1966. The single also had an American release on Parrot. The band were popular in the Manchester area.

However, after "Girl", there were no more hits, despite two more singles "Behind The Door" and "East Side Story" being released. They performed "Behind the Door", "Respect" and "Down in the Valley" on 12 April 1966 on Top of the Pops, and appeared again on the show and played "East Side Story" plus "Things Get Better" and "Don't Worry Girl" on 1 November 1966. The same year they supported Otis Redding at the Manchester Apollo on 15 September and they also played "English Tea" and "I Got my Pride" in the film The Ghost Goes Gear. The band split up in 1967.

== Members ==
- Tony Cassidy (born 22 July 1947, Manchester – 2005) – vocals
- Keith Millar (born 15 April 1947, Manchester – died 17 May 2005) – guitar
- Alex Kirby (born 6 January 1947, Walkden) – saxophone/flute
- Lenni Zaksen – saxophone/flute
- Bernie Brown – saxophone/flute
- Dave Formula (born David Tomlinson, Whalley Range, Manchester) – keyboards
- John Nichols (born 10 August 1947, Manchester) – bass
- Dave Webb (born 5 August 1947, Salford – died April 2017) – drums

Members' later careers

- Guitarist Keith Millar subsequently joined the Rod Stewart's band, but died on 17 May 2005.
- Singer Tony Cassidy also died in 2005 after a career in teaching. In the 1970s he was the youngest head teacher in the UK.
- Before the St Louis Union, David Tomlinson played with Lorraine Gray and the Chapperones plus another band called the Roadrunners. He later had a role in the subsequent new wave scene, under the stage name of Dave Formula, as a member of Magazine, Visage, Ludus and Luxuria, and working with Howard Devoto and Tuxedomoon's Winston Tong.
- Bassist John Nichols has since developed a career as an actors headshot photographer in Manchester and has won the Heist Award. Bernie Brown continues to play saxophone in Spain and on the Costa Del Sol with cover bands.
- Dave Webb played drums in the Wigan-based band, The New Soul Messengers, but died in April 2017.

== Discography ==
All released in 1966 on Decca Records

- "Girl" (b/w "Respect") UK release 6 January 1966 – US release on Parrot Records, a division of London Records
- "Behind The Door" (b/w "English Tea") UK release 22 April 1966
- "East Side Story" (b/w "Think About Me") UK release 21 October 1966
