= Hearts and Knives =

- Cover photography by Peter Ashworth

Studio album by Visage
- Released: 20 May 2013
- Recorded: 2012–2013
- Genres: Synth-pop; pop; rock
- Label: Blitz Club
- Producers: John Bryan, Sare Havlicek

Visage studio album chronology
The Damned Don't Cry (2000)	Hearts and Knives (2013)	Orchestral (2014)

Singles from Hearts and Knives
- 1. "Shameless Fashion" Released: 6 May 2013; 2. "Dreamer I Know" Released: 23 July 2013; 3. "Never Enough" Released: 9 December 2013; 4. "Hidden Sign" Released: 23 May 2014; 5. "She's Electric (Coming Around)" Released: August 2014

Hearts and Knives is the fourth studio album by the British synth-pop band Visage. It was released on 20 May 2013 and was the band's first album of new material in 29 years.

== Background ==
In January 2013, Visage announced their new line-up to consist of vocalist and founding member Steve Strange, bassist Steve Barnacle (who had worked with the band on their 1984 album Beat Boy), Robin Simon (former guitarist in Ultravox and Magazine) and Lauren Duvall on vocals. The band's official website confirmed that former Visage/Magazine keyboardist Dave Formula and former Simple Minds keyboardist Mick MacNeil have also contributed to the album.

== Album cover ==
The make-up and "Fade to Grey"-style mask seen on the front cover were created by Lara Himpelmann, and the cover shot was taken by photographer Peter Ashworth, who supplied the black and white photograph that artist Iain Gillies utilized to paint the picture that was the cover of Visage's debut album in 1980. The new logo and graphics have been designed by The Nick Foot Studio.

== Release ==
A single, "Shameless Fashion", was released as a digital download in April 2013 and followed by a physical CD-single release on 6 May.

Hearts and Knives was released on 20 May 2013 through the band's own label Blitz Club.

A second single, "Dreamer I Know", was released on 23 July 2013. A promo video for the single (the band's first since 1984) was produced. The single includes the non-album track entitled "Digital Age". The third single from the album, "Never Enough", was released on 9 December 2013, with a vinyl release to follow in January 2014. The fourth single from the album, "Hidden Sign", was released as a CD-single and a download on 23 May 2014 with a 12" vinyl single available from Rough Trade Records. The fifth and final single from the album, "She's Electric (Coming Around)", was released in August 2014.

== Reception ==
Professional ratings
Review scores
Source	Rating
The New Zealand Herald	2/5
Record Collector	3/5 stars

Lydia Jenkin of The New Zealand Herald called it "a solid album steeped in nostalgia. [...] But really, it's one for the fans – and those needing an early-'80s fix." Record Collector's review commented "the new Visage album sounds like the past 30 years failed to happen," and called it "a supremely engaging diversion."

== Track listing ==
1. "Never Enough" (John Bryan, Rich Mowatt, Robin Simon, Sare Havlicek, Steve Strange)
2. "Shameless Fashion" (Ben Woods, Bryan, Nigel Summers, Mowatt, Simon, Strange)
3. "She's Electric (Coming Around)" (Bryan, Josh Legg, Kyle Petersen, Mick MacNeil, Strange)
4. "Hidden Sign" (Bryan, Julie Scott, Mowatt, Havlicek, Steve Barnacle, Strange)
5. "On We Go" (Guy Hatfield, Bryan, John Graham, Simon, Strange)
6. "Dreamer I Know" (Arno Carstens, Bryan, Martin Glover, MacNeill, Strange)
7. "Lost in Static" (Christian Kennerney, Greg Benns, Bryan, Marco di Carlo, Strange)
8. "I Am Watching" (Bryan, Graham, Simon, Havlicek, Strange)
9. "Diaries of a Madman" (Dave Formula, Ross Tregenza, Strange)
10. "Breathe Life" (Barnacle, Strange)

== Personnel ==
Visage

- Steve Strange – vocals
- Steve Barnacle – bass
- Robin Simon – guitar
- Lauren Duvall – vocals

Additional personnel

- Dave Formula – keyboards
- Mick MacNeil – keyboards
- Logan Sky – keyboards
- Rich Mowatt – keyboards
- John Bryan – additional backing vocals
- Sare Havlicek – keyboards, drums
- "Wildcat" Will Blanchard – drums
- Nigel Summers – additional guitar ("Shameless Fashion")
