= Hong Kong Syndikat =

Hong Kong Syndicat
- Origin: West Berlin, Germany
- Genres: Synthpop; dance; electronic
- Years active: 1981–1989

Hong Kong Syndikat (also Hongkong Syndikat) was a German synthpop music group of the eighties.

== History ==
Hong Kong Syndikat formed at the beginning of the Eighties after decorator and disc-jockey Bruno Grünberg, graphics designer Hartmut Möller and Gerd Plez, all from Bremen, met in West Berlin. They were signed to a record contract, and in 1982 they released their debut album, Erster Streich.

The first single, Berlin Bleibt Doch Berlin, contained quotes from then US President Ronald Reagan. This first album was still recorded mainly in German; subsequent releases would see them switch to English for commercial reasons.

This move eventually was met with acclaim: by 1984 Hong Kong Syndikat performed their first live concert in New York City; later the same year they recorded their second album, Olympia, in London -- produced by Rusty Egan, a member of Visage. This album, like the others, had Curt Cress sit in on drums.

Their short-lived success came in 1985 with their third album, Never Too Much, from which three singles were released: Too Much, Concrete & Clay and Girls I Love, the first two of which became Top 30 pop singles in Germany.

Hong Kong Syndikat were not able to repeat or expand on this: when the 4th album Des Teutons Pas Nippons (1987) turned out to become a commercial flop, the act disbanded in 1989. Gerd Plez would eventually re-appear as a songwriter for Austrian pop singer Falco.

== Members ==
- Bruno Grünberg jr. (* 04/01/1956) (voice, synth)
- Gerd Plez (* 10/04/1956) (voice, synth)
- Hartmut Möller (* 05/09/1952) (guitar)

== Discography ==
=== Singles/Maxi ===
- Sugarcane
- Unusual
- 1982 · Berlin Bleibt Doch Berlin (album Erster Streich)
- 1984 · Berlin (album Olympia)
- 1984 · Samba Olec (album Olympia)
- 1985 · Too Much (album Never Too Much)
- 1986 · That's Jungle / Loosin' Winnin' (album Never Too Much)
- 1986 · Concrete & Clay (album Never Too Much)
- 1986 · Girls I Love (album Never Too Much)
- 1987 · No More Sorrow (album Des Teutons Pas Nippons)
- 1989 · Real Men Don't Eat Gummibears (album Des Teutons Pas Nippons)
- 1999 · Too Much '99 (album Des Teutons Pas Nippons)

=== Albums ===
- 1982 · Erster Streich
- 1984 · Olympia
- 1985 · Never Too Much
- 1987 · Des Teutons Pas Nippons
