= Amboss =

Amboss is the German and Luxembourgish word for "anvil".

It may also refer to:

- "Amboss", a track on the 1971 album Ash Ra Tempel
- "Der Amboss", a 1983 song by Visage from their album Fade to Grey: The Singles Collection
- "Amboss", a German professional wrestling stable of which Laurance Roman was a member
- "Amboss", a racing horse that won the 1962 Union-Rennen
- "AMBOSS", a medical technology company founded in 2012 and headquartered in Berlin, Germany
