= Love Glove =

Single by Visage

from the album Beat Boy
- B-side: "She's a Machine"
- Released: 17 August 1984
- Recorded: Trident Studios, 1983
- Genre: Synth-pop; new wave
- Length: 4:00
- Label: Polydor Records
- Songwriters: Steve Strange, Rusty Egan, Steve Barnacle
- Producer: Visage

Visage singles chronology
"Pleasure Boys" (1982)	"Love Glove" (1984)	"Beat Boy" (1984)

"Love Glove" is a song by the British synth-pop group Visage, released as a single by Polydor Records on 17 August 1984. It was the first single to be released from Visage's third album, Beat Boy, and peaked at #54 on the UK Singles Chart.

== Music video ==
Two music videos for "Love Glove" exist. One version is the clip shot in Egypt by Jean-Claude Luyat, as a part of a full-length video incorporating songs from The Anvil and Beat Boy. It features Egyptian pyramids and Steve Strange riding a camel across the desert as well as singing on a yacht. This version was later included on the Visage video album in 1985.

Another version was shot by Nick Morris in London's Docklands in August 1984. In this version, Steve Strange appears in his Beat Boy album cover make up.

The cover art for the single features Steve Strange posing with two models, one of whom is Yasmin Le Bon.

== Track listings ==
- 7" single (1984)

A. "Love Glove" – 4:00
B. "She's a Machine" – 4:50

- 12" single (1984)

A. "Love Glove" (Long Version) – 6:38
B1. "Love Glove" (Instrumental) – 3:24
B2. "She's a Machine" – 4:50

== Personnel ==
- Steve Strange — vocals
- Rusty Egan — drums, electronic drums programming
- Steve Barnacle — bass, synthesizer
- Andy Barnett — guitar
- Gary Barnacle - saxophone
- Marsha Raven — backing vocals
- Karen Ramsey — backing vocals
- Rose Patterson — backing vocals

== Chart performance ==
Chart	Peak position
United Kingdom	54
