= The Anvil (album) =

Studio album by Visage
- Released: 26 March 1982
- Recorded: 1981
- Studio: Mayfair, London
- Genre: Synth-pop; new wave
- Length: 40:33
- Label: Polydor
- Producer: Visage & Midge Ure

Visage studio album chronology
Visage EP (1981)	The Anvil (1982)	Fade to Grey – The Singles Collection (1983)

Singles from The Anvil
- 1. "The Damned Don't Cry" Released: 5 March 1982; 2. "Night Train" Released: 18 June 1982; 3. "Whispers" Released: 1982 (Japan only)

The Anvil is the second studio album by the British synth-pop band Visage, released on 26 March 1982 by Polydor Records. The album reached No. 6 in the UK and was certified "Silver" by the British Phonographic Industry in April 1982.

== Recording ==
The Anvil was recorded in the latter part of 1981 at Mayfair Studios, London by the same line-up of the first album, except for John McGeoch who had left both Visage and Magazine to join Siouxsie and the Banshees. Original Visage bassist Barry Adamson rejoined as a session musician and contributed to several tracks.

== Release ==
The Anvil was released in March 1982. It reached No. 6 on the UK Albums Chart, which was the band's highest ever chart peak in the UK, and was certified "Silver" by the British Phonographic Industry in April 1982. The album sparked a brief controversy at the time of its release for being named after New York's famous gay bar/nightclub of the era.

The album's first single was "The Damned Don't Cry" which was released three weeks ahead of the album and reached No. 11 in the UK Singles Chart. The second single released was "Night Train" in June 1982, reaching No. 12. The album's title track was remixed and released as a promo single as well as a German-language 12" version ("Der Amboss"), and "Whispers" was also released as a single in Japan (where both it and "Night Train" were used in TDK television commercials).

The album's front cover photograph was taken by Helmut Newton, at a reported cost of £4000. The original vinyl release of the album came in an embossed/textured sleeve (considered as deluxe packaging for the time), and a limited number of copies (3,000) came with a free poster of Steve Strange posing with a number of models at the Hôtel George-V in Paris (the poster is an extended shot of the 12" single cover of "The Damned Don't Cry").

The Anvil was the last Visage record to feature Ultravox frontman Midge Ure, who left the band after its release. Commenting on his departure the following year, Ure stated:

"The trouble with Visage was that there were too many chiefs, six characters all wanting an equal say without putting in an equal amount of work. I was doing most of the writing and producing, and we all knew Steve [Strange] was the frontman, but when it became successful, jealousy and the nasty side of the business crept in. That was never the way it was intended.

— Midge Ure, 1983

In later years, when reflecting upon the album, Ure also stated he felt the track "Again We Love" would have been a good single.

The album's first release on the compact disc format was in Germany in 1983. It was re-issued on CD in the United States in 1997 by One Way Records, complete with two bonus tracks (though they are tracks from the 1980–81 era and not that of The Anvil). The Anvil was re-issued in the UK on CD by Cherry Red Records on 17 March 2008, containing six bonus tracks and detailed liner notes. A Remastered Edition, mastered from the original tapes, was released on CD in the US in 2020 by Rubellan Remasters including all the B sides and Dance mixes from the singles.

== Reception ==
Professional ratings
Review scores
Source	Rating
AllMusic	3/5 stars
Record Collector	4/5 stars
Record Mirror	4.5/5 stars
Smash Hits	5/10

In his retrospective review, Dan LeRoy of AllMusic wrote that "almost all the band's efforts on The Anvil are extremely well-crafted synth pop." Emily Mackay of Record Collector opined that the album "[still] sounds remarkably fresh." Sonia Ducie of Record Mirror described the album as "fluent, melodic, entertaining dance music".

== Track listing ==
All tracks are written by Visage (Billy Currie, Rusty Egan, Dave Formula, Steve Strange and Midge Ure).

Side A
No.	Title	Length
1.	"The Damned Don't Cry"	4:43
2.	"Anvil (Night Club School)" (known as "The Anvil" elsewhere, including various compilation albums and singles)	4:39
3.	"Move Up"	4:25
4.	"Night Train"	4:29

Side B
No.	Title	Length
1.	"The Horseman"	4:41
2.	"Look What They've Done"	4:49
3.	"Again We Love"	4:44
4.	"Wild Life"	4:24
5.	"Whispers"	5:39

1997 reissue bonus tracks
No.	Title	Length
10.	"We Move (Dance Mix)"	6:28
11.	"Frequency 7 (Dance Mix)"	5:02

2008 reissue bonus tracks
No.	Title	Length
10.	"We Move (Dance Mix)"	6:28
11.	"Frequency 7 (Dance Mix)"	5:02
12.	"The Damned Don't Cry (Dance Mix)"	5:45
13.	"Motivation"	3:51
14.	"I'm Still Searching"	3:41
15.	"Mind of a Toy (Dance Mix)"	5.14

2020 remaster bonus tracks
No.	Title	Length
10.	"Motivation"	3:45
11.	"I'm Still Searching"	3:38
12.	"We Move (USA Unreleased Single Remix)"	3.43
13.	"The Damned Don't Cry (Dance Mix)"	5:43
14.	"Night Train (Dance Mix)"	6.07
15.	"The Anvil (Dance Mix)"	6.13
16.	"Pleasure Boys (Dance Mix)"	6.55

== Personnel ==
=== Visage ===
- Steve Strange – lead vocals
- Midge Ure – guitars, backing vocals, synthesizer
- Dave Formula – synthesizer
- Billy Currie – electric violin, synthesizer
- Rusty Egan – drums, backing vocals, electronic drums

=== Additional personnel ===
- Barry Adamson – bass
- Gary Barnacle – saxophone
- Perri Lister – backing vocals
- Lorraine Whitmarsh – backing vocals

== Charts ==
=== Weekly charts ===
Weekly chart performance for The Anvil
Chart (1982)	Peak position
Finnish Albums (Suomen virallinen lista)	25
German Albums (Offizielle Top 100)	41
New Zealand Albums (RMNZ)	38
Swedish Albums (Sverigetopplistan)	33
UK Albums (OCC)	6

=== Year-end charts ===
Year-end chart performance for The Anvil
Chart (1982)	Position
UK Albums (OCC)	97

== Certifications ==
Certifications for The Anvil
Region	Certification	Certified units/sales
United Kingdom (BPI)	Silver	60,000^{^}
^{^} Shipments figures based on certification alone.
