= Werner Böhm =

German musician (1941–2020)

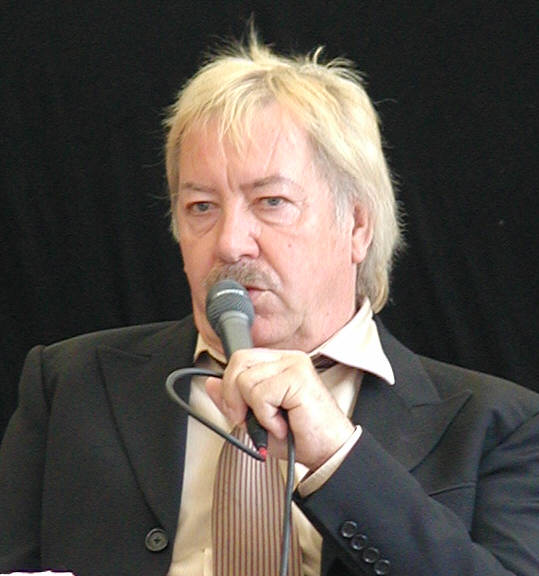
- Böhm in 2004

Background information
- Born: June 5, 1941; Thorn, Poland
- Died: June 2, 2020 (aged 78); Gran Canaria, Spain
- Genres: Schlager
- Occupation(s): Singer, musician, actor

Werner Böhm, better known under his artist name Gottlieb Wendehals (5 June 1941 – 2 June 2020) was a German singer and musician.

== Biography ==
Böhm was born in Thorn in German-occupied Poland. In the late 1950s, he was the pianist with the "Cabinet Jazzmen" in Hamburg until the early 1960s, at the time one of the most popular jazz bands in Northern Germany. From 1970 to 1971 he was a jazz pianist in Hamburg at "Jazz House", "Riverkasematten", "Logo", "Dennis Swing Club", "Cotton Club", "Remter" and in the legendary "Onkel Po". Böhm accompanied on piano singers such as Louis Armstrong, Ella Fitzgerald and Erroll Garner.

Böhm achieved his greatest commercial success with his character Gottlieb Wendehals, a bespectacled, bow-tie-wearing schlager singer with a chessboard pattern suit. His most successful hit "Polonäse Blankenese" spent nine weeks at the top of the German single charts in late 1981 and early 1982. Together with Karl Dall and Helga Feddersen he appeared in the comedy film Sunshine Reggae auf Ibiza (1983).

In 1982 he took part in the preliminaries of the Eurovision Song Contest with the song "Der Ohrwurm". He finished 11th in the second-last place. He was also involved, together with Michael Chambosse, as writer and composer of the song "Lady" (6th place), sung by his wife (at that time) Mary Roos and David Hanselmann. He died in Gran Canaria, Spain, three days short from his 79th birthday.

== Discography ==
=== Singles ===
- 1979: Herbert
- 1980: Morgens Fango – Abends Tango
- 1981: Mensch ärgere Dich nicht
- 1981: Polonäse Blankenese
- 1982: Jap dadel dip, dadel dup dadel
- 1982: Der Ohrwurm
- 1982: Polonäse mit Getöse
- 1982: Damenwahl
- 1983: Schick, Schick Bum, Bum
- 1984: Get On Up
- 1984: I’m a Winner
- 1985: Schlappi Räp met Klaus Schlappner
- 1986: Alles hat ein Ende, nur die Wurst hat zwei
- 1990: Wenn die Nordlichter feiern
- 1990: Wenn die Kirschblüten blüh'n im Alten Land
- 1997: Samba Ramba Zamba
- 2000: Polonäse 2000
- 2004: King of the Jungle (Werner Böhm vs. Gottlieb Wendehals)
- 2004: Old Mac Donald
- 2004: Summertime – Sunny Days (Werner Böhm vs. Gottlieb Wendehals)
- 2006: Saalrunde
- 2006: Tarzan ist wieder da
- 2008: Fernsehen macht dumm dumm
- 2010: Polonäse Blankenese (Haidie vs. Gottlieb Wendehals)
- 2010: Der neue Böhm
- 2011: Der Yeti (Es läuft ein Yeti durch die Serengeti)
- 2011: Ein Eisbär in Sibirien
- 2015: Gehen wir noch wohin

=== Albums ===
- 1979: Polonäse Blankenese
- 1982: ErVolksLieder
- 1982: Polonäse mit Getöse
- 1983: Da kommt Freude auf
- 1983: Gran Canaria
- 1984: 84 AHEAD
- 1988: Polonäse Blankenese
- 1990: Freibier für Deutschland
- 1991: Wenn die Kirschblüten blüh'n
- 1998: Schmarozza
- 2009: Darf ich bitten, Polonäse
- 2020: Let's Party ohne Ende
