= Seize (band) =

British electronic band

Seize are a British electronic band.

== History ==
The origins of Seize date back to 1997, when Sandrine Gouriou and Steven Young (both of whom later went on to join the British synth-pop band, Visage) collaborated to form the project Seize The Day, with the duo going on to produce their debut EP, Blades. A year later, they changed the name to Seize. Following their debut gig in London in 2000, the pair went on to perform across the country.

The duo's second single, "Victim", was released on 12" white label, featuring a club-oriented remix. 2000 saw Seize release their first album, Lunacy.

In order to expand the scope of their live performances, Seize recruited bass guitarist Rosie Harris in 2002, and by then the group were heading towards a more breakbeat and trance direction. With the help of producer Mark O'Grady, the band created remixes, such as the Seize version of The Nursery's "Caprice".

Seize toured in 2003 across the UK and Europe to promote their forthcoming album, The Other Side of Your Mind. Among others, Radio One and Future Music picked up on the new album, and both made Seize a featured artist.

The band was signed by Belgian label Alfa Matrix in 2003, and The Other Side of Your Mind was released in November of that year, reaching number 8 in the German Alternative Charts. After the album release, Seize toured, with shows including the Wave-Gotik-Treffen festival in Leipzig. Gouriou, Young, and Harris spent most of 2005 touring with Steve Strange as a backing band for Visage. The following year saw the return of Seize on the tour circuit, this time with the addition of drummer Sean Suleman. Highlights included supporting Apoptygma Berzerk on their UK tour, playing the Swedish Alternative Music Awards, and being asked to support Front 242 at one of their two 25th-anniversary shows in Brussels.

Despite losing Suleman to Mesh, the album Constant Fight was completed toward the end of 2008 and released in Europe in June 2009; it had a limited release in the UK. The lead single, "Who's Your Teacher", is a departure from Seize's breakbeat/drum-and-bass roots.

Following contributions to the Constant Fight sessions, Michel Radermecker and Paul Jeffrey later joined Seize's line-up as full time members on the release of the record – in 2009.

== Members ==
- Sandrine Gouriou – lead vocals, lyrics, music, programming, sampling, keyboards
- Steven Young – backing vocals, lyrics, music, programming, sampling, keyboards
- Rosie Harris – backing vocals, keyboards, bass, visual effects
- Michel Radermecker – drums, percussion, loops
- Paul Jeffrey – guitars, E-bow, vocals, keyboard

== Discography ==
- Constant Fight (Alfa Matrix 2009)
- Rematch (Alfa Matrix 2009)
- The Other Side of Your Mind (Alfa Matrix 2003)
- Lunacy (2000)
