= Beat Boy =

Studio album by Visage
- Released: 26 October 1984
- Recorded: 1982–1983
- Studios: Trident Studios, London
- Genres: Synth-pop; new wave
- Length: 46:05
- Label: Polydor
- Producer: Visage

Visage studio album chronology
Fade to Grey – The Singles Collection (1983)	Beat Boy (1984)	Hearts and Knives (2013)

Singles from Beat Boy
- 1. "Love Glove" Released: 17 August 1984; 2. "Beat Boy" Released: 9 November 1984

Beat Boy is the third studio album by the British new wave band Visage. It was recorded at Trident Studios from 1982 to 1983 and released by Polydor Records on 26 October 1984 (delayed by contractual problems the band were having at that time). Reaching No. 79 on the UK album chart, the album was a critical and commercial flop, and would be the band's last studio album for almost thirty years.

== Background ==
The album was recorded and released after Midge Ure had left the band in 1982 due to creative conflicts and to concentrate on his role in Ultravox, and lead singer Steve Strange decided to make Visage a live band instead of being solely a studio-based project. This decision left him working only with drummer Rusty Egan and a trio of newer musicians. Billy Currie (the Ultravox keyboardist who had been part of Visage for their first two albums) left the band soon after recording commenced, though he co-wrote and played on the track "Only The Good Die Young". Keyboardist Dave Formula, who co-wrote two tracks, also departed the band during this time.

Beat Boy was originally released on vinyl and cassette. The cassette version of the album featured remixes of the album's original tracks, with a total running time of over 50 minutes. This included an extra track, the instrumental "Reprise" (a reprise of the track "Questions").

Beat Boy was eventually released on CD for the first time in February 2009 by Cherry Red Records, and featured the same track list as the original vinyl album with four extra tracks (see below). The remixed version of the album (as featured on the original cassette) was released by Rubellan Remasters on CD in 2022.

== Reception ==
Professional ratings
Review scores
Source	Rating
AllMusic	2/5 stars
Record Mirror	1/5
Smash Hits	2/10

Beat Boy was poorly received by critics. In a scathing review of the album, Ian Cranna of Smash Hits characterised Strange and Egan as "two wafer-thin talents" and described the album as "a cross between all-purpose Euro-disco and Queen, with excruciatingly amateurish lyrics".

In Record Mirror, Robin Smith dismissed the album as "the distant cries of an act well past it's [sic] prime, and all the make-up in the world isn't going to cover the cracks."

Though the band's first two studio albums peaked within the Top 20 and Top 10 respectively, each earning a Silver disc in the UK, Beat Boy peaked at number 79 and spent only two weeks on the album chart. Two singles were released from the album, "Love Glove" in August 1984 (UK No. 54) and "Beat Boy" in November 1984, which did not chart. The critical and commercial failure of the album effectively marked the end of Visage as a recording act for the next couple of decades.

== Track listing ==
All tracks are written by S. Barnacle, Rusty Egan and Steve Strange, except as noted.

Side A
No.	Title	Writer(s)	Length
1.	"Beat Boy"	Barnacle, Barnett, Egan, Dave Formula, Strange	6:46
2.	"Casualty"	Barnacle, Barnett, Egan, Strange	5:28
3.	"Questions"		6:11
4.	"Only the Good (Die Young)"	Barnacle, Barnett, Billy Currie, Egan, Formula, Strange	5:58

Side B
No.	Title	Writer(s)	Length
1.	"Can You Hear Me"		6:29
2.	"The Promise"	Barnacle, Barnett, Egan, Strange	3:59
3.	"Love Glove"		4:45
4.	"Yesterday's Shadow"		6:29

2009 reissue bonus tracks
No.	Title	Writer(s)	Length
9.	"Beat Boy" (dance mix)		7:19
10.	"Love Glove" (long version)		6:38
11.	"She's a Machine"	Barnacle, Barnett, Egan, Strange	4:54
12.	"Der Amboss"	Currie, Egan, Formula, Strange, Midge Ure	5:39

=== Remixed cassette version ===
Side A
No.	Title	Length
1.	"Beat Boy" (Different mix to the 12” and DJ Promo 12”)	7:15
2.	"Casualty" (Dance mix)	5:58
3.	"Questions" (Dance mix)	7:06
4.	"Only The Good (Die Young)" (Different intro to album version)	5:30

Side B
No.	Title	Length
1.	"Can You Hear Me" (Different mix of intro)	6:26
2.	"The Promise" (Dance mix)	4:08
3.	"Love Glove" (Longer version of album mix, different to 12”.)	5:40
4.	"Yesterday's Shadow" (Identical to album version)	6:30
5.	"Reprise" (instrumental reprise of the intro section to the Dance Mix of "Questions")	2:35

2022 Rubellan Remaster CD reissue bonus tracks
No.	Title	Length
10.	"Beat Boy" (Extended dance mix from DJ Promo 12”)	8.44
11.	"Love Glove" (Full 12” version)	6:36
12.	"She's a Machine"	4:50
13.	"Yesterday’s Shadow" (Unreleased 7” version)	4.02
14.	"Beat Boy" (7” version)	3.30

== Personnel ==
Visage

- Steve Strange – lead vocals
- Andy Barnett – guitar
- Steve Barnacle – bass
- Gary Barnacle – saxophone
- Rusty Egan – drums, electronic drum

Additional personnel

- Billy Currie – keyboards
- Dave Formula – keyboards
- Marsha Raven – backing vocals
- Karen Ramsey – backing vocals
- Rose Patterson – backing vocals
