= Fade to Grey (Visage song) =

Single by Visage

from the album Visage
- B-side: "The Steps"
- Released: 14 November 1980
- Genre: Synth-pop; new wave; new pop; electronic
- Length: 4:02 (album version); 3:50 (single edit)
- Label: Polydor
- Songwriters: Billy Currie; Chris Payne; Midge Ure
- Producers: Midge Ure; Visage

Visage singles chronology
"Tar" (1979)	"Fade to Grey" (1980)	"Mind of a Toy" (1981)

1993 re-release cover

"Fade to Grey" is a song by the British synth-pop band Visage, released on 14 November 1980 as the second single from their debut album, Visage (1980), on Polydor Records.

The song was the band's most successful single. It entered the singles charts in late 1980, peaking at no. 8 in the UK Singles Chart and reaching no. 1 in West Germany and Switzerland. Steve Strange was on lead vocals; the French lyrics were spoken by Rusty Egan's then-girlfriend Brigitte Arendt.

The accompanying music video for the song became one of the first videoclips that Kevin Godley and Lol Creme directed, before they became known for their works with the Police, Duran Duran and Herbie Hancock.

== Background ==
"Fade to Grey (Orchestral)" released in 2014

"Fade to Grey" was originally written as an instrumental by Billy Currie and Chris Payne. Payne came up with the bassline and the chords while Currie added the other parts. They worked on it during soundchecks on Gary Numan's 1979 tour. Cedric Sharpley, the drummer of Numan's backing band, was also heavily involved. In those days it was called "Toot City". Initially considered to be released as a Billy Currie and Chris Payne single, the track eventually became part of the Visage project. While setting the track listing of the Visage album, Midge Ure (who had heard the track in sound checks whilst he was playing keyboards on the parallel USA tour of Thin Lizzy), suggested the use of the melody and wrote the song's lyrics.

"Fade to Grey" was Visage's second single, but their first release on a major label, Polydor. It was released in 1980, on the same day as the band's debut album, Visage. "Fade to Grey" charted around Europe in late 1980/early 1981, becoming a Top 10 hit in the UK, a Top 5 hit in five countries, and no. 1 in West Germany and Switzerland. The song is sung in English and spoken in French.

A remix by Bassheads/Andy Stevenson was released in 1993 to promote the Fade to Grey – The Best of Visage compilation (an updated re-release of 1983's Fade to Grey – The Singles Collection). The new version became a modest Top 40 hit in the UK, peaking at no. 39.

In 2008, Steve Strange appeared on the BBC series Ashes to Ashes performing the song in the Blitz nightclub.

In 2014, Visage released "Fade to Grey (Orchestral)", a new version of the song re-recorded with a symphony orchestra. This followed the band's appearance at the 2014 World Ski Jumping Championships in Prague, Czech Republic, where they played a ten-song set backed by the Czech Synthosymphonica Orchestra. The band also released an album, Orchestral, which featured several classic Visage songs rerecorded with the orchestra.

== Authorship ==
Steve Strange and Midge Ure both claimed to have been the one who came up with the idea for the French vocal in the track. On the finished track, the French vocal was performed by Brigitte Arendt, a young student from Luxembourg who was Rusty Egan's girlfriend at the time. On the single and album, the song is credited to Billy Currie, Chris Payne and Midge Ure. In his 2002 autobiography, Strange said it was not fair to credit the song to Ure, Currie and Payne only, since his input was significant and he was "the focal point of the group".

== Music video ==
Visage's first music video was for this song, and was directed by Godley & Creme. Appearing with Steve Strange in the video was his friend Julia Fodor, who mimed the French lyrics in the video. The clip was included on band's 1986 video release, Visage.

== Track listings ==
- 7-inch single (1980)

A. "Fade to Grey" – 3:50
B. "The Steps" – 3:13

- 12-inch single (1980)

A. "Fade to Grey" – 3.50 (UK release) 6:17 (German release only)
B. "The Steps" – 3:13

- 12-inch single (1993)

A1. "Fade to Grey" (Bassheads Vocal Mix) – 7:11
A2. "Fade to Grey" (Bassheads Dub Mix) – 7:35
A3. "Fade to Grey" (Bassheads Trance Mix) – 7:28
B1. "Fade to Grey" (Original Mix) – 3:51
B2. "Fade to Grey" (Subliminal Mix) – 5:16
B3. "Fade to Grey" (12" Mix) – 8:06

- CD maxi-single (1993)
1. "Fade to Grey" (Bassheads 7" Edit) – 3:22
2. "Fade to Grey" (7" Remix) – 3:37
3. "Fade to Grey" (Original 7" Mix) – 3:51
4. "Fade to Grey" (Wild Cat Mix) – 7:48
- Orchestral version (2014)
1. Fade to Grey (Orchestral Version)
2. Fade to Grey (Main Version)
3. Fade to Grey (Extended Version)
4. Fade to Grey (Extended Instrumental)
5. Fade to Grey (Orchestral Instrumental)
6. Fade to Grey (Orchestral Radio Version)
7. Fade to Grey (Orcapella)

== Charts ==
=== Weekly charts ===
Chart (1980–1981)	Peak position
Australia (Kent Music Report)	6
Austria (Ö3 Austria Top 40)	3
Belgium (Ultratop 50 Flanders)	4
Denmark (IFPI)	6
France (IFOP)	3
Ireland (IRMA)	7
Italy (Musica e dischi)	6
Netherlands (Dutch Top 40)	22
Netherlands (Single Top 100)	24
New Zealand (Recorded Music NZ)	10
Spain (AFE)	25
Sweden (Sverigetopplistan)	12
Switzerland (Schweizer Hitparade)	1
UK Singles (Official Charts)	8
West Germany (GfK)	1

Chart (1993)	Peak position
UK Singles (Official Charts)	39
UK Dance (Music Week)	8
UK Club Chart (Music Week)	25

=== Year-end charts ===
Chart (1981)	Rank
Australia (Kent Music Report)	44
Austria (Ö3 Austria Top 40)	12
Belgium (Ultratop 50 Flanders)	49
France (IFOP)	17
Switzerland (Schweizer Hitparade)	9
West Germany (Media Control)	4

== Certifications and sales ==
Region	Certification	Certified units/sales
France (SNEP)	Gold	500,000^{*}
Germany (BVMI)	Gold	500,000^{^}
United Kingdom (BPI)	Silver	250,000^{^}
^{*} Sales figures based on certification alone.^{^} Shipments figures based on certification alone.

== Cover versions ==
=== Mark 'Oh cover ===
German DJ Mark 'Oh covered "Fade to Grey" in 1996. His version reached no. 11 in Germany and was a Top 40 hit in Switzerland, Austria, Finland and the Netherlands.

Chart (1996)	Peak position
Austria (Ö3 Austria Top 40)	24
Finland (Suomen virallinen lista)	20
Germany (GfK)	11
Hungary (Mahasz)	2
Netherlands (Dutch Top 40)	35
Netherlands (Single Top 100)	24
Sweden (Sverigetopplistan)	45
Switzerland (Schweizer Hitparade)	15

=== Other cover versions ===
In 1994, the Italian electronic group Datura made a version of "Fade to Grey" with a re-recorded vocal track by Steve Strange singing lyrics specifically for this version. The single peaked at no. 5 in the Italian singles chart.

== Influence ==
- In the official U2 autobiography, U2 by U2, Bono claims that Adam Clayton was trying to work out how to play the bassline of "Fade to Grey" and his attempt became "New Year's Day", U2's first Top 10 single.
- French DJ Vitalic named the "incredible" song as a strong influence.

== See also ==
- List of number-one hits of 1981 (Germany)
- List of number-one singles of the 1980s (Switzerland)
