= Gary Barnacle =

English saxophonist and composer (born 1959)

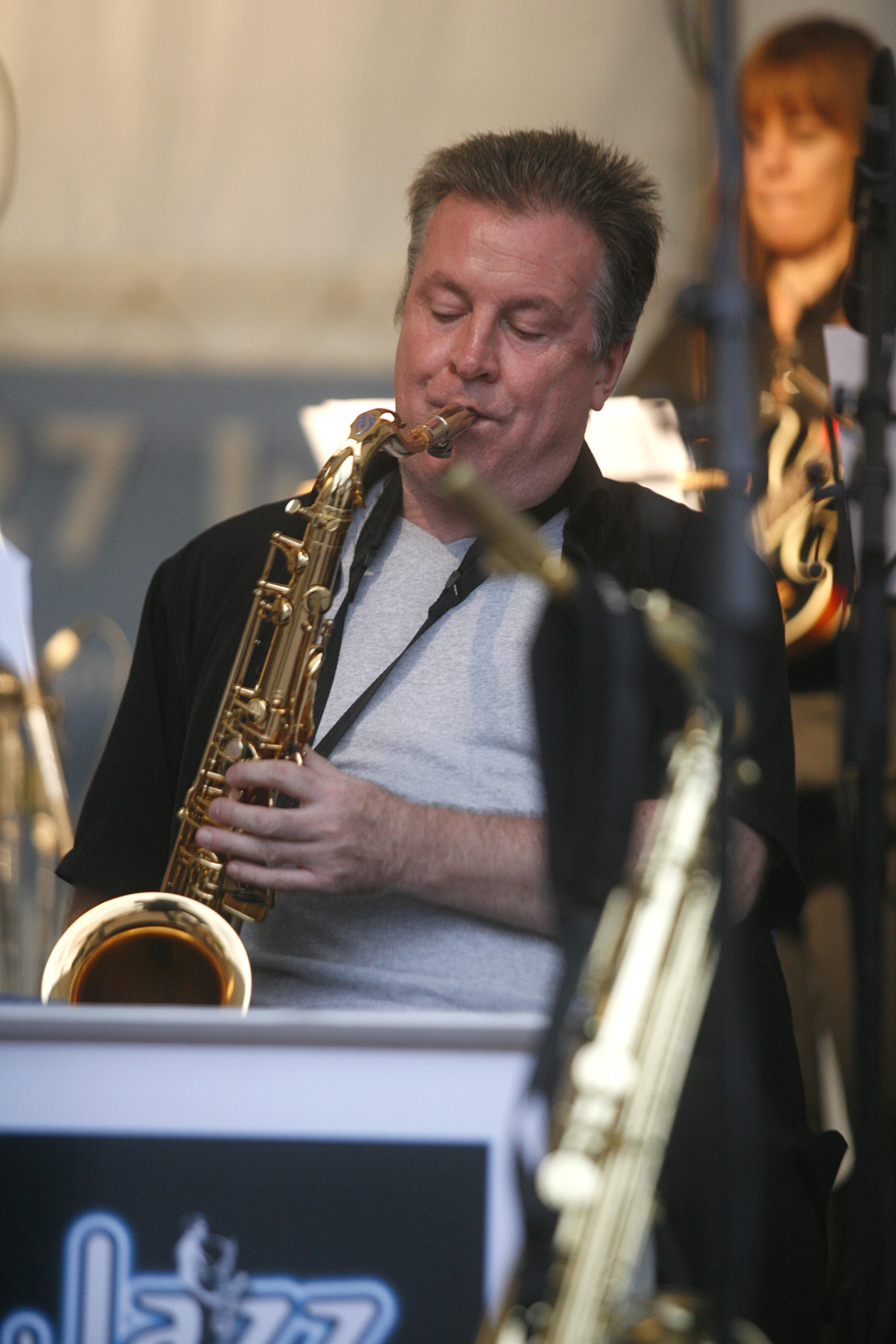
- Barnacle playing with Big Band at Rochester Castle, 2011

Background information
- Born: 1959 (age 66–67); Dover, Kent, England
- Origin: London, England
- Genres: Pop; rock; synth-pop; jazz
- Occupations: Saxophonist; arranger; composer; producer; multi-instrumentalist
- Instruments: Saxophone; flute; keyboards
- Years active: 1977–present
- Member of: Cutting Crew
- Formerly of: The Ruts; Visage; Leisure Process; Level 42

Gary Barnacle (born 1959) is an English saxophonist, flautist, brass instrument arranger, composer, and producer. Barnacle is primarily noted for his session work and live work, including various Prince's Trust concerts at Wembley Arena, the Royal Albert Hall and the National Exhibition Centre in Birmingham. He performed at the Nelson Mandela 70th Birthday Tribute at Wembley Stadium in 1988, and appeared on television and in music videos during the 1980s and 1990s with many popular music acts. He was also in a new wave duo called Leisure Process from 1982 to 1983 with ex-Positive Noise singer Ross Middleton.

== Biography and career ==
=== The early years (1977–1980) ===
Gary Barnacle was born in Dover, England in 1959.

Barnacle played the saxophone on several songs and albums by the Clash; he played on their album Sandinista! released on 12 December 1980 as a triple album, the single "This Is Radio Clash" released on 20 November 1981, and Combat Rock released on 14 May 1982. He was introduced to the Clash through their drummer Topper Headon, a school friend of Barnacle's and reportedly became involved in the Clash's infamous 1978 "pigeon shooting" incident.

Barnacle, trumpeter Luke Tunney, and trombonist Annie Whitehead played together on many sessions from 1979 to 1982, alongside Pete Thoms on trombone. Barnacle collaborated with the Ruts on their first two albums, both on Virgin Records: The Crack and Grin & Bear It. After their frontman, Malcolm Owen, was found dead from a heroin overdose on 14 July 1980, the band continued with Barnacle as Ruts D.C. (where "D.C." stands for the Italian term da capo) in a different musical vein. They released the album Animal Now in May 1981 on Virgin Records, before Barnacle departed following disagreements with the original Ruts, to be replaced by Dave Winthrop on Rhythm Collision released in July 1982 on Bohemian Records. Ruts D.C. split in 1983. During 1979–1980, he also contributed to M's debut album, New York • London • Paris • Munich, released in 1979 and to Sanity Stomp, released by Kevin Coyne in 1980.

=== The 1980s (1981–1989) ===
In 1981, Barnacle contributed to the debut albums by Positive Noise: Heart of Darkness and Stray Cats. He also contributed to In Trance as Mission by Simple Minds, "Power and the Passion" by Midnight Oil, and played saxophone on Rick Wakeman's 1984. That year he also played saxophone on Black Snake Diamond Röle by former Soft Boys frontman Robyn Hitchcock. From 1990 to 1994, Barnacle toured with Level 42 and played on two of the band's albums: Guaranteed and Forever Now. The horn section he formed for Level 42, with British trumpet and fluegelhorn player John Thirkell, was known as the Hen Pecked Horns. Since then, Barnacle and Thirkell have provided the horn section for many recordings. Along with Thoms, they formed the Phantom Horns, one of the UK's horn sections which appear on a number of recordings from 1987 onwards.

In 1982, he and ex-Positive Noise singer Ross Middleton formed a synth-pop duo called Leisure Process. The band released four singles on the Epic label: two in 1982 ("Love Cascade" and "A Way You'll Never Be", which featured Mark King and Phil Gould of Level 42), and two in 1983 ("Cashflow" and "Anxiety"). All four singles were produced by Martin Rushent. In 1982, Barnacle also collaborated on Julien Clerc's Femmes, Indiscrétion, Blasphème, Mike Rutherford's Acting Very Strange, Marius Müller-Westernhagen's Das Herz eines Boxers, and with Visage's The Anvil. In 1984, his brother Steve was already in the band and Billy Currie and Dave Formula left; Barnacle and Andy Barnett replaced them for what would become Visage's Beat Boy album, which was released in September 1984 and yielded two singles, "Love Glove" and "Beat Boy". A decision to make Visage a live band instead of a strictly studio-based project failed and the band subsequently split in 1985.

In 1983, he contributed to Catch as Catch Can by pop singer Kim Wilde (whom he dated in the mid-1980s) and also to In Strict Tempo by Dave Ball and Private Dancer by Tina Turner. Barnacle later toured in Europe with Turner and participated in the recording sessions of her 1989 album Foreign Affair. He also appeared on the 1983 edition of Drama of Exile by Nico, where he also played the drums, "Right Now" by Siouxsie Sioux's second band the Creatures, Dalek I Love You's eponymous album, Jerky Versions of the Dream by Howard Devoto, Secret by Classix Nouveaux, Vocabulary by the Europeans, C'est C Bon by Carlene Carter, and Working with Fire and Steel by China Crisis, a collaboration that was repeated later in 1986 with the release of What Price Paradise. The year ended with the publication of the soundtrack for Educating Rita.

In 1984, Barnacle contributed to the recording sessions for This Is What You Want... This Is What You Get by Public Image Ltd, In the Long Grass by the Boomtown Rats, All the Rage by General Public, This Last Night in Sodom by Soft Cell, and Vermin in Ermine by Marc Almond and the Willing Sinners. He also performed on Olympia by Hong Kong Syndikat, Bite Black and Blues by Raoul and the Ruined, In on the Off Beat by Hey! Elastica and Influences, a solo album by Mark King of Level 42. Barnacle began a long collaboration with Elvis Costello, for whom he provided saxophone for Goodbye Cruel World. He also appears on many of Costello's compilation albums.

In 1985, Barnacle played on No Jacket Required, a solo album by Phil Collins, which sold over 25 million copies worldwide; he also played on Phantasmagoria by the Damned, Easy Pieces by Lloyd Cole and the Commotions, Some People by Belouis Some, the Dream Academy's eponymous debut album, Knights Like This by Peter Blegvad and Mad Not Mad by Madness.

In 1986, he appeared on Writing on the Wall by Bucks Fizz, Stop Start by Modern English, Dancing in My Sleep by Dave Adams, U-Vox by Ultravox, Cutting Crew's debut album, the UK number one album Silk and Steel by Five Star, Sooner or Later by Murray Head, the debut album by Erasure, Into the Light by Chris de Burgh, Big Canoe a solo album released by former Split Enz frontman Tim Finn, Press to Play by Paul McCartney, and 1st Down & Ten by Keep It Dark. Barnacle played saxophone on "Suburbia" by Pet Shop Boys, and he also appeared on Absolute Beginners: The Original Motion Picture Soundtrack, playing on tracks by David Bowie, the Style Council, Ray Davies, Working Week and Gil Evans.

In 1987, Barnacle was featured on the hit singles "China in Your Hand" by T'Pau, "Roadblock" by Stock, Aitken and Waterman and "Breakout" by Swing Out Sister. He also contributed to the releases of Red by the Communards, Banzai Baby by Sandii & the Sunsetz, and Rick Astley's Whenever You Need Somebody, which was a collaboration that was repeated with the release of Astley's 1989 album, Hold Me in Your Arms. Barnacle performed on Feelin' Good About It by This Way Up, Can't Wait to See the Movie, the seventh solo album released by Roger Daltrey of the Who, Stand Up by Jo Lemaire, Never Never Land by Simon F, If by Hollywood Beyond and Swing Out Sister's It's Better to Travel and Get in Touch with Yourself.

In 1988, Barnacle worked on Bullet from a Gun by Derek B, Human Animal by Karel Fialka, and Creeping Up on Jesus by the Big Dish. Barnacle worked with Paul Hardcastle on No Winners, Sound Syndicate, and The Jazzmasters project, in which he was the co-artist and co-writer along with Hardcastle and Helen Rodgers. This was released in 1992. Barnacle also participated in the release of the debut album by Celtic rock group Hothouse Flowers, Yazz's debut album, The Jeremy Days and Circushead (1990) by the Jeremy Days, Monster Jam by Ambassadors of Funk, Union by Toni Childs, Rage by T'Pau, Working Girl OST, Steppin' Out by Daryl Stuermer, No Outsiders by Judy Cheeks, and 24hrs by Scarlet Fantastic.

In 1989, Barnacle performed on Moss Side Story by Barry Adamson, Boomerang by Siouxsie Sioux's second band the Creatures, and Here Today, Tomorrow Next Week! by Björk's band the Sugarcubes. After the band split in 1992, Barnacle contributed to Björk's first two solo albums: Debut, released in 1993, and Post, released in 1995. He also performed on Bass! by Simon Harris, the Beautiful South's debut album and Choke (1990), Hard Reyne by James Reyne, Bankstatement, a solo project by Genesis keyboardist Tony Banks, Waterfront by Waterfront, and I'm Still Here by Eartha Kitt.

=== The 1990s (1990–1999) ===
In 1990, Barnacle appeared as a session musician on Naked by Blue Pearl, Trading Secrets with the Moon by The Adventures, Dangerous by Andy Taylor, First Time Ever by Joanna Law, Melting Down on Motor Angel by Sunsonic, Running from the Guns by Die Laughing, Stand Strong by Junior Giscombe, Jordan: The Comeback by Prefab Sprout, and December by Dag Kolsrud, which was followed by December II that was released in 1991. He also appeared on the single "Always the Last to Know" from the album Change Everything by Del Amitri and on A Pocketful of Dreams, the debut album by English boyband Big Fun. In 1991, he also worked on Meanwhile by German synthpop group Camouflage, Changing Faces by Bros, Black Meaning Good by Rebel MC, Marchand de cailloux from French artist Renaud, Let's Get to It by Kylie Minogue, The Apple by A Man Called Adam, and the eponymous album by Rain Tree Crow, which was the name used by the English new wave band Japan (excluding Rob Dean) when they briefly reformed for this one-off project.

In 1992, Barnacle collaborated with Soul II Soul on their third studio album, Volume III: Just Right, and he returned in 1995 for Volume V: Believe. He worked on Mind Adventures by Des'ree, Boing!! by Jefferson Airhead, Praise by Praise, and Grass Roots by Takagi Kan.

In 1993, Barnacle helped realize Jamiroquai's debut album and also worked on Guru's Jazzmatazz, Vol. 1 by Guru, To Hell with Humdrum by Kingmaker, and One and All by Supermax. In 1993, he played on James Brown's Universal James album (produced by Jazzie B).

In 1994, he played on Jamiroquai's The Return of the Space Cowboy album. He released his first solo album, Love Will Find a Way and contributed to El pan y la sal by Spanish pop band Presuntos Implicados. He also appeared as the saxophonist in the house band on the spoof chat show Knowing Me Knowing You with Alan Partridge.

In 1995 he worked on Hold On by Jaki Graham, The Tooth Mother by Mick Karn, Love and Respect by Marla Glen, Deadline for My Memories by Billie Ray Martin, Mirror Mirror by 10cc, and Siouxsie and the Banshees song "New Skin" for the movie soundtrack of Showgirls.

In 1996, Barnacle helped realize Status Quo's Don't Stop and the Sputnik: The Next Generation's eponymous album featuring Tomoyasu Hotei. Games by Happy Clappers and Feedback by Vargas Blues Band were released in 1997.

In 1997, he played and arranged the brass section for the No.1 single "I Wanna Be The Only One" by Eternal, and played on "Are You Jimmy Ray?" by Jimmy Ray. In 1999, he appeared as a session musician on When The Good Times Come by Hard Rain.

=== Recent projects (2000–present) ===
Barnacle returned to the music industry in 2001 when he, Hugh Hopper, Jakko Jakszyk, Dave Stewart, and Clive Brooks recorded a new version of "As Long as He Lies Perfectly Still" by Soft Machine for the compilation Man in a Deaf Corner: Anthology 1963–1970. In 2002, Barnacle released his second solo album, Paradise.

Other acts for whom Barnacle has contributed, live or in session, have included Pet Shop Boys, David Bowie, Spare Snare and ABC. He worked frequently with Stock Aitken Waterman as a session musician in their PWL studios. Barnacle is frequently credited as an arranger of woodwinds, brass, and string instruments on his session work.
