= Orchestral (Visage album) =

Live album by Visage
- Released: 8 December 2014
- Genre: New wave; classical
- Label: August Day Recordings
- Producer: John Bryan, Sare Havlicek

Visage album chronology
Hearts and Knives (2013)	Orchestral (2014)	Demons to Diamonds (2015)

Orchestral is an album by the British synth-pop group Visage, released on 8 December 2014. It is an album of twelve songs (eleven from the band's back catalogue and one new song), rerecorded with a live symphony orchestra.

An orchestral version of the band's seminal hit, "Fade to Grey", was released as a single in November 2014 ahead of the album.

== History ==
In March 2014, after a year promoting their previous album, Hearts and Knives, Visage were invited to appear at the closing ceremony of the World Ski Jumping Championships in Harrachov. They were backed by the Czech Synthosmphonica Orchestra, headed by Armin Effenberger, whose speciality is mixing classical music arrangements and full orchestras with classic synthesizer music. At the ceremony, Visage performed a ten-song set of their hits with the full orchestra. The album also contains tracks recorded with the Prague Philharmonic Orchestra.

In 2024, Visage released a remixed version of the album called The Prague Sessions. The album added a dance element to the original album and was promoted as "Visage meets Pet Shop Boys". The new version dropped "Love Glove" and "The Silence" from the original album's track listing and instead includes two mixes of "Fade To Grey".

== Track listing ==
1. "The Damned Don't Cry"
2. "Fade to Grey"
3. "Dreamer I Know"
4. "Mind of a Toy"
5. "Visage"
6. "The Anvil"
7. "Never Enough"
8. "Pleasure Boys"
9. "Hidden Sign"
10. "Night Train"
11. "Love Glove"
12. "The Silence"
