= Demons to Diamonds (album) =

Studio album by Visage
- Released: 6 November 2015
- Genre: Synth-pop; pop; rock
- Label: August Day
- Producer: John Bryan, Sare Havlicek

Visage studio album chronology
Orchestral (2014)	Demons to Diamonds (2015)

Darkness to Diamond
- An album of alternative mixes, Darkness to Diamond, was released in January 2016.

Demons to Diamonds is the fifth and final studio album by the British synth-pop band Visage. It was released on 6 November 2015, nine months after the death of lead vocalist Steve Strange.

== Background ==
Work began on the album in 2014. During a break in the recording, vocalist Steve Strange died while on holiday in Egypt in February 2015, though several tracks had already been written and recorded by this time including a cover of David Bowie's 1985 hit "Loving the Alien". The track "Become" was written by former Visage member Midge Ure, with Ure's original version first appearing on his 2014 album Fragile. The track "Star City" was co-written by Didier Marouani of the French electro band Space (most notable for their 1970s hit "Magic Fly").

In the months following Strange's death, the remaining members of Visage decided to complete the album. Strange's family and friends then formed The Steve Strange Collective, "a foundation to promote and celebrate the legacy of Steve Strange and the organisations and causes he was involved with." The organisation states that all royalties from the album will go to the Steve Strange Statue Fund, which is raising money to have a memorial bronze statue of Strange made and sited in his hometown in Wales.

The album's cover photograph was by Boy George (credited as "Rude George"), who had known Strange since the late 1970s.

Rather than release any singles from the album, the band decided to release a companion album called Darkness To Diamond in early 2016. It features remixes and alternate versions of the ten songs from Demons To Diamonds, and the first ever external remix made by Visage of a song called "Heartbleed" by James Grant, former frontman of the 80s band Love and Money. The song began life when Visage approached Grant to collaborate on songwriting with them, and he was sent a set of lyrics written by Steve Strange which Grant then expanded upon. However, by the time the song was written, Strange had died and never recorded his vocals for the track. The song was ultimately performed by Grant.

== Release ==
Demons to Diamonds was released on 6 November 2015. In addition to digital formats, it was available as a compact disc and a limited edition coloured vinyl album (in green, blue, opaque green, and grey).

== Track listings ==
=== Demons to Diamonds ===
1. "Before You Win" (John Bryan, John Graham, Sare Havlicek, Steve Strange)
2. "Become" (Midge Ure)
3. "Loving the Alien" (David Bowie)
4. "Days Become Dark" (Francois Gamaury, John Bryan, Steve Strange)
5. "Seven Deadly Sins (Part Three)" (John Bryan, Robin Simon, Sare Havlicek, Steve Strange)
6. "Aurora" (Adam Fielding)
7. "Your Skin Is My Sin" (Francois Gamaury, John Bryan, Steve Strange)
8. "Clubscene" (David Boswell, John Bryan, Nick Eastwood, Sare Havlicek, Steve Strange)
9. "Star City" (Didier Marouani, John Bryan, Sare Havlicek, Steve Barnacle)
10. "Never" (Steve Barnacle, Steve Strange)

=== Exclusive bonus disc ===
Copies pre-ordered from Visage's webstore included a bonus CD-R containing three exclusive tracks.

1. "Before You Win" (Radio Edit)
2. "Never Enough (Richard Stone & John Bryan In Prague Version)"
3. "Star City (Orbital Ambient Version)"

=== Darkness to Diamond ===
1. Aurora (Map Of Human Heart Extended Version)
2. Loving The Alien (Invasion Remix)
3. Your Skin Is My Sin (Antidote Version)
4. Sax Scene
5. Star City (Instrumental)
6. Become (Glass Houses & Stones Remix)
7. Days Become Dark (Elimination Version)
8. Never (Zambon Remix)
9. Before You Win (Diamond Remix)
10. Seven Deadly Sins Part Three (Darkness Version)
11. James Grant - Heartbleed (Visage Remix) (bonus track)

== Personnel ==
Visage

- Steve Strange – vocals
- Steve Barnacle – bass
- Robin Simon – guitar
- Lauren Duvall – vocals

Additional personnel

- Mick MacNeil – keyboards, programming
- "Wildcat" Will Blanchard – drums
- Logan Sky – keyboards
- Sare Havlicek – keyboards, programming
- John Bryan, John Graham, Robin Lee, Sare Havlicek – additional backing vocals
- John Bryan, Sare Havlicek – producers
- Sare Havlicek – mixed by
- Richard Elson – artwork
- "Rude George" – cover photography
- Chevy One, OD Hunte, Patrick Ruane, Paul Richard Simon – additional engineering
- Yuri Dent – mastering
