= Mind of a Toy =

1981 single by Visage

Single by Visage

from the album Visage
- B-side: "We Move", "Frequency 7"
- Released: 6 March 1981
- Recorded: Genetic Studios, 1980
- Genre: Synth-pop; new wave
- Length: 3:33
- Label: Polydor
- Songwriters: Steve Strange, Midge Ure, Billy Currie, John McGeoch, Rusty Egan, Dave Formula
- Producers: Midge Ure, Visage

Visage singles chronology
"Fade to Grey" (1980)	"Mind of a Toy" (1981)	"Visage" (1981)

"Mind of a Toy" is the third single by the British synth-pop group Visage, released by Polydor Records on 6 March 1981. It was taken from the band's eponymous debut album, following up their international hit "Fade to Grey".

== Music video ==
The music video for the single was directed by former 10cc members Godley & Creme, who had branched out into video production by that time. The theme of the video was Steve Strange's idea, who decided on a Little Lord Fauntleroy look. In his autobiography, Blitzed!, Strange claimed that the video was banned by the BBC's Top of the Pops as it was considered to be "frightening for children", however it was actually screened on the show on 19 March 1981.

== Track listing ==
- 7" single (1981)

A. "Mind of a Toy" – 3:33
B. "We Move" – 4:00

- 12" single (1981)

A. "Mind of a Toy" (Dance Mix) – 5:13
B1. "We Move" (Dance Mix) – 6:30
B2. "Frequency 7" (Dance Mix) – 5:02

== Personnel ==
- Steve Strange – lead vocals
- Midge Ure – guitar, lead vocals
- Billy Currie – synthesizer
- John McGeoch – guitar
- Rusty Egan – drums, electronic drums programming
- Dave Formula – synthesizer

== Chart performance ==
Chart	Peak position
Germany	10
Ireland	16
Netherlands	42
United Kingdom	13
