= Visage (video) =

- Original VHS cover

Video by Visage
- Released: 1 August 1985 (VHS); 27 March 2006 (DVD)
- Recorded: 1980–1983
- Genre: Pop
- Length: 51 mins
- Label: Polygram (Channel 5) (VHS); Universal Music Group (DVD)
- Director: Jean-Claude Luyat
- Producer: Franz Auffray, Jean-Baptiste Donzella

DVD cover
- 2006 DVD cover

Visage is a compilation video by the British band Visage, released in August 1985.

== Background ==
The video album compiles most of the music videos from the band's career between 1980 and 1984, including songs from their first three studio albums. The first part of the video consists of promo videos directed by Godley & Creme, Midge Ure, Tim Pope and Jean-Claude Luyat interspersed with interludes filmed by Luyat. The footage from "Can You Hear Me" onwards is film material shot by Luyat in Egypt in 1983, which includes tracks from 1982's The Anvil and Beat Boy, which would be released in 1984. This includes footage shot for the song "Love Glove", though an alternative promo video for the song (directed by Nick Morris in a late night London Docklands setting) was released to TV stations in 1984 but is not included.

The project was first announced as a "documentary about the history of Visage" in Smash Hits magazine in 1983, shortly before Steve Strange's trip to Africa where much of the footage was filmed. He announced the release of the video in 1985 in an interview for a German television show, again claiming it to be "a documentary on the history of Visage".

The video album was released in 1985 by Polygram's "Channel 5" brand, when Visage had already disbanded. In 2006, Universal Music released it on DVD with a different cover and liner notes by music journalist Paul Simper.

== Track listing ==
The following is the VHS track listing. The DVD release does not list "The Steps", "The Dancer" and two parts of "Can You Hear Me" as separate titles (although it is identical to the VHS release), and adds jukebox and an audio-only option as extra features.

1. "Visage"
2. "The Steps" (interlude)
3. "Fade to Grey"
4. "The Dancer" (interlude)
5. "Damned Don't Cry"
6. "Pleasure Boys"
7. "Mind of a Toy"
8. "Night Train"
9. "Can You Hear Me" (interlude)
10. "Casualty" (interlude)
11. "The Horseman"
12. "Yesterday's Shadow"
13. "Love Glove"
14. "Wild Life"
15. "Beat Boy"
16. "Can You Hear Me" (Reprise) (end credits)

== Personnel ==
- Starring Steve Strange and Rusty Egan
- Executive Producers: Franz Auffray and Jean-Baptiste Donzella
- Directed and Filmed by: Jean-Claude Luyat
- Compilation Video Editor: Simon Brewster
- Compilation Produced and Directed by: Peter Olliff
