= Bassheads =

British house duo

- Origin: Wirral, England
- Genres: House
- Years active: 1989–1993
- Labels: Deconstruction, Parlophone, Decca
- Past members: Nick Murphy; Eamonn Anthony Deery

Bassheads was a British house duo from Wirral. This consisted of Nick Murphy and Eamonn Anthony Deery. The group had a big European hit with "Is There Anybody Out There?"

== History ==
Murphy and Deery started to produce house music in Nick Murphy's home studio in 1989. Their first recording was the white label "The Defhouse Vol. 1" and their third release, "Is There Anybody Out There?", was picked up by Deconstruction Records for national distribution. In November 1991 it got to number 5 in the UK Singles Chart, and charted in other European countries. The original white label resulted in threats of legal proceedings for illegal use of samples from Afrika Bambaataa's "Just Get Up and Dance", Talking Heads' "Once in a Lifetime" and Pink Floyd's "Is There Anybody Out There?". Therefore the Deconstruction version contained re-recorded versions of the sampled tracks, other than the Pink Floyd sample. The use of samples for Afrika Bambaataa was cleared by giving 25% of the publishing. Pink Floyd allowed Bassheads to use their sample on the promo but not for full release. Nick Murphy (Bassheads) re-wrote the opening section also replaying the Talking Heads sample. The Osmonds' "Crazy Horses" guitar riff was replaced by a session player.

Nick Murphy was the musician/engineer programmer on most of, or all of the Bassheads material commercially released / white labels, apart from a major contribution on "Is There Anybody Out There" from Shaun Imre. It was recorded mixed and mastered by Nick Murphy at his home studio, with the exception of a handful of tracks on the Bassheads album C.O.D.E.S, which were co-produced and mixed by Dave Eringa at Konk Studios in London (owned by The Kinks). These tracks also originated from Nick Murphy's new studio called "The Lodge" in Neston.

Over the next three years Bassheads had three more hit singles, and remixed tracks for Oceanic, Björk and Visage. In 1993, Deconstruction released the album C.O.D.E.S. which contained ambient influences. This proved to be Bassheads' last release.

Murphy has released recordings under the name "Angel". More recently he has been involved in film score/ambient work, also some live Bassheads gigs, recreating the original recordings from Baked Tapes from the original recordings (done on an old Fostex E16 multi track Tape Machine) to play live PAs with Ableton Live. He has reissued three new remixes of "Who Can Make Me Feel Good" with releases due in October 2024 on all usual streaming services.

== Discography ==
=== Albums ===
- C.O.D.E.S. (Deconstruction, 1993)

=== Singles ===
| Year | Title | Peak chart positions |
| Year | Title | UK |
|---|---|---|
| 1991 | "Is There Anybody Out There?" | 5 |
| 1992 | "Back to the Old School" | 12 |
| 1992 | "Who Can Make Me Feel Good?" | 38 |
| 1993 | "Start a Brand New Life (Save Me)" | 49 |
