= Visage (Visage album) =

- Visage cover by Iain Gillies

Studio album by Visage
- Released: 14 November 1980
- Recorded: 1979–1980
- Studios: Genetic Studios, Reading, Berkshire, England
- Genres: New wave; electronica; dance-rock; disco
- Length: 38:27
- Label: Polydor
- Producers: Visage, Martin Rushent

Visage chronology
Visage (1980)	Visage EP (1981)

Singles from Visage
- 1. "Tar" Released: 2 November 1979; 2. "Fade to Grey" Released: 14 November 1980; 3. "Mind of a Toy" Released: 6 March 1981; 4. "Visage" Released: 3 July 1981

Visage is the debut studio album by the British synth-pop band Visage. It was recorded at Genetic Sound Studios in Reading, Berkshire and released in November 1980 by Polydor Records.

== Release ==
Visage was released on 14 November 1980, simultaneously with the album's second single, "Fade to Grey". It reached No. 13 in the UK and was certified Silver by the British Phonographic Industry in March 1981. "Fade to Grey" was released as a single and became a hit, reaching No. 8 on the UK Singles Chart and Top 10 positions in Europe, including No. 1 in Germany and Switzerland. Further singles, "Mind of a Toy" and the title track "Visage" were also UK Top 30 hits. The album was reissued as an expanded CD edition remastered from the original master tapes by Rubellan Remasters in the US in 2018.

The song "Tar" was released on 2 November 1979. It was the band's sole release on Radar Records before they signed to Polydor Records the following year. The song's lyrics are centred on the habit of smoking cigarettes. As Steve Strange put it in his autobiography, the song is about "the pleasure and pain of nicotine". The B-side to the single is "Frequency 7", a rapid synthesizer composition with vocoder vocals. (An extended, instrumental "Dance Mix" of the song was released on the "Mind of a Toy" single in 1981. Both versions were re-released by the band in 2013). "Tar" was not a chart hit, and Radar's distribution deal collapsed shortly after the single was released. A newer version of the song appeared on Visage's eponymous debut album released in 1980. The "Tar" single is the only Visage release featuring bassist Barry Adamson as a member of the band, receiving composing credits for both songs. He played a smaller role as a session musician in all subsequent releases. No music video was produced for the track.

== Reception ==
Professional ratings
Review scores
Source	Rating
AllMusic	4.5/5 stars
Robert Christgau	B−
Smash Hits	5/10

Aaron Krehbie of Digital Audio commented that "Moon over Moscow" and "Blocks on Blocks" are "perfect examples of Visage at its best". However, Krehbie also opined that the album was not "the group's best effort", preferring the group's next album, The Anvil.

In his retrospective review, Dan LeRoy of AllMusic wrote "this is the music that best represents the short-lived but always underrated new romantic movement", calling it "a consistently fine creation".

== Track listing ==
All tracks are written by Visage (Billy Currie, Rusty Egan, Dave Formula, John McGeoch, Steve Strange and Midge Ure), except where noted.

Side A
No.	Title	Writer(s)	Length
1.	"Visage"		3:53
2.	"Blocks on Blocks"		4:00
3.	"The Dancer"	Egan, Ure	3:40
4.	"Tar"	Barry Adamson, Currie, Egan, Formula, McGeoch, Strange, Ure	3:32
5.	"Fade to Grey"	Currie, Chris Payne, Ure	4:02

Side B
No.	Title	Length
6.	"Malpaso Man"	4:14
7.	"Mind of a Toy"	4:28
8.	"Moon Over Moscow"	4:00
9.	"Visa-age"	4:20
10.	"The Steps"	3:14

CD reissue bonus track
No.	Title	Length
11.	"Fade to Grey (Dance Mix)"	6:41

Rubellan Remasters 2018 Expanded Edition bonus tracks
No.	Title	Length
11.	"We Move"	4.00
12.	"Fade to Grey (Dance Mix)"	6.43
13.	"Mind of a Toy (Dance Mix)"	5.15
14.	"Visage (Dance Mix)"	6.03
15.	"We Move (Dance Mix)"	6.29
16.	"Frequency 7 (Dance Mix)"	5.03
17.	"Second Steps"	5.27

== Personnel ==
Visage

- Steve Strange – lead vocals
- Midge Ure – guitar, backing vocals, synthesizers
- John McGeoch – guitar, backing vocals, saxophone
- Dave Formula – synthesizer
- Billy Currie – electric violin, synthesizer
- Rusty Egan – drums, backing vocals, electronic percussion

Additional personnel

- Barry Adamson – bass guitar (1, 2, 4)
- Chris Payne – synthesizer (5)
- Cedric Sharpley – drums, drum programming (5)
- Brigitte Arendt – voice (5)

Technical

- John Hudson – recording, engineering, mixing
- Iain Gillies — sleeve artwork, a blue/grey tinted monochrome original painting, (based on a b/w photograph by Peter Ashworth)
- Peter Ashworth – original sleeve photography (redrawn for publication)
- Martin Rushent – co-production and mixing

== Charts ==
=== Weekly charts ===
Weekly chart performance for Visage
Chart (1981)	Peak position
Australian Albums (Kent Music Report)	17
Austrian Albums (Ö3 Austria)	11
German Albums (Offizielle Top 100)	1
New Zealand Albums (RMNZ)	14
Swedish Albums (Sverigetopplistan)	22
UK Albums (Official Charts)	13
US Billboard 200	178

=== Year-end charts ===
Year-end chart performance for Visage
Chart (1981)	Position
German Albums (Offizielle Top 100)	9
UK Albums (OCC)	60

== Certifications ==
Certifications for Visage
Region	Certification	Certified units/sales
France (SNEP)	Gold	100,000^{*}
Germany (BVMI)	Gold	250,000^{^}
United Kingdom (BPI)	Silver	60,000^{^}
^{*} Sales figures based on certification alone.^{^} Shipments figures based on certification alone.
