= Visage (band) =

British new wave band

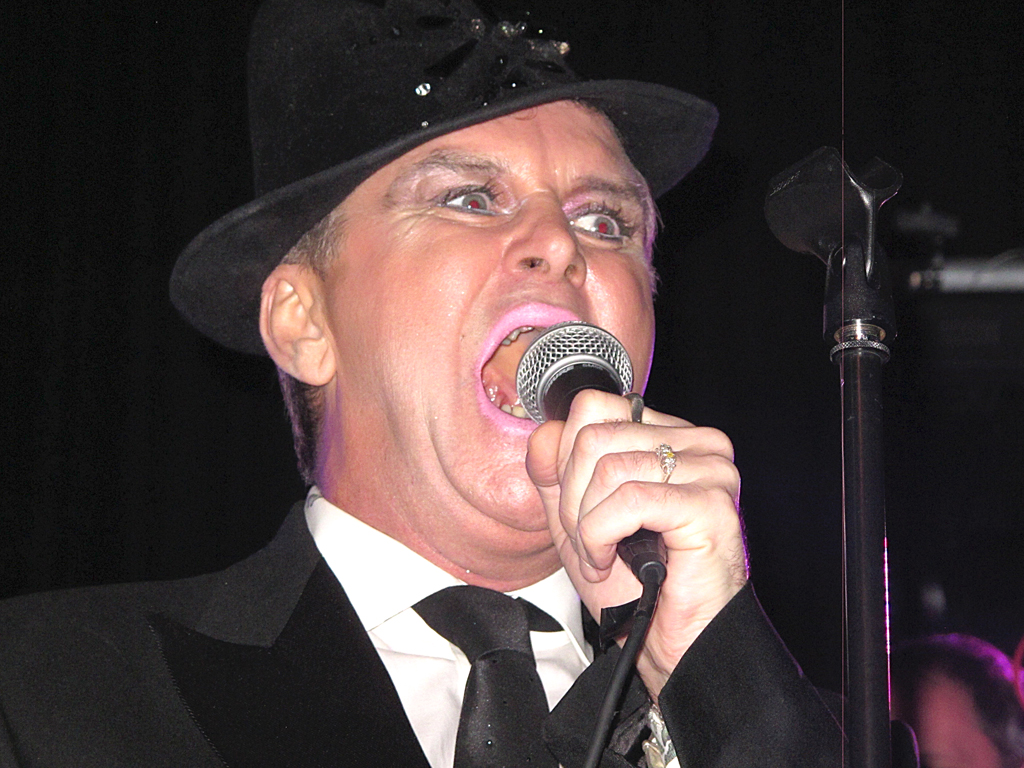
- Steve Strange, lead singer of Visage, in 2014

Background information
- Origin: London, England
- Genres: Synth-pop; new wave
- Years active: 1978–1985, 2002–2011, 2012–2015
- Labels: Polydor; Radar; Blitz Club/Control Room
- Spinoff of: Magazine
- Past members: Steve Strange; Rusty Egan; Midge Ure; Billy Currie; Dave Formula; John McGeoch; Barry Adamson; Steve Barnacle; Gary Barnacle; Andy Barnett; Lauren Duvall; Robin Simon; Steve Young
- Website: http://therealvisage.com

Visage were a British new wave pop band formed in London in 1978. The band became closely linked to the burgeoning New Romantic fashion movement of the early 1980s, and are best known for their hit "Fade to Grey" which was released in November 1980. In the UK, the band achieved two Top 20 albums (Visage and The Anvil) and five Top 30 singles before the commercial failure of their third album (Beat Boy) led to their breakup in 1985.

The band saw various line-up changes over the years, all fronted by vocalist Steve Strange, who resurrected the band name in the 2000s. In 2013, the final line-up of the band released Hearts and Knives, the first new Visage album in 29 years. The band's fifth and final album, Demons to Diamonds, was released in 2015, nine months after Strange had died following a heart attack.

== History ==
=== First incarnation (1978–1985) ===
Founding members Midge Ure and Rusty Egan started working on Visage to produce music to play at the clubs where Egan was DJing. Egan alongside Steve Strange was hosting David Bowie and Roxy Music club-nights weekly at Billy's nightspot in London's Soho district and Egan was eager to find new music to play, ultimately opting to create music himself with Ure. Steve Strange had briefly been in the punk/new wave bands The Moors Murderers and The Photons, and Egan was working with Ure in the band The Rich Kids. Ure and Egan recorded a demo which included the original track "The Dancer" of which a version appeared on the debut Visage album and a cover of the Zager and Evans hit "In the Year 2525". Strange was then brought into the band to provide the face and voice of Visage with the line-up being completed with the addition of Ultravox keyboardist Billy Currie and three-fifths of the post-punk band Magazine – guitarist John McGeoch, keyboardist Dave Formula and bassist Barry Adamson (who left the band after playing on its debut single, but returned as a session musician).

Producer Martin Rushent had heard some of the band's material at Billy's and financed further recordings with a view to signing the band to his new Genetic Records label. However, Rushent's label collapsed, and the band instead signed to Radar Records, a new independent label run by Rushent's former colleague Martin Davis (the pair had worked together at United Artists Records). Visage released their first single "Tar" on Radar in September 1979, though the single failed to chart. By this time, however, Strange and Egan had relocated their themed club-nights to the Blitz Club in Covent Garden from where the New Romantic movement would emerge. In mid-1980, David Bowie visited the club and asked Strange and three other Blitz regulars to appear in the video for his single "Ashes to Ashes", which helped to propel the New Romantic movement into the mainstream.

Visage recorded their self-titled debut album at Rushent's home studio in Berkshire, but it was not released until November 1980 when the band was now signed to the major label Polydor Records. The band's second single, "Fade to Grey", was released at the same time. The single became a hit in early 1981, making the top ten in the UK Singles Chart and several other countries, and reaching no. 1 in Germany and Switzerland. The album also became a Top 20 hit in the UK and was certified Silver by the British Phonographic Industry.

After further hits with the singles "Mind of a Toy" and the title track "Visage", Strange struggled to reunite the band's members again to record a second album due to their commitments with their respective bands; Ure had now joined Currie in Ultravox, Formula and Adamson with Magazine and McGeoch had joined Siouxsie and the Banshees. In late 1981, Visage went into the studio and recorded The Anvil as a five-piece band without McGeoch and only limited guest work from Adamson. The album, which was named after the infamous gay nightclub in New York City, was released in March 1982 and became the band's only Top 10 hit in the UK Albums Chart, producing two top-twenty singles with "The Damned Don't Cry" and "Night Train". Like their first album, The Anvil earned a Silver disc in the UK. Following this, Ure left Visage to concentrate on his work with Ultravox, who were now even more successful than Visage. Creative differences with Strange and Egan were also cited as reasons for his departure at the time.

The trouble with Visage was that there were too many chiefs, six characters all wanting an equal say without putting in an equal amount of work. I was doing most of the writing and producing, and we all knew Steve [Strange] was the frontman, but when it became successful, jealousy and the nasty side of the business crept in. That was never the way it was intended.

— Midge Ure, 1983

Visage were now without Ure, McGeoch and Adamson, who went on to join Nick Cave and the Bad Seeds. Bassist Steve Barnacle was recruited to replace Adamson, and the remaining line-up recorded the stand-alone single "Pleasure Boys", which was released in October 1982. The single failed to prolong their string of hits and peaked just outside the UK Top 40.

Although still recording, Visage then took a two-year hiatus from releasing any new material due to contractual difficulties with their management company. Polydor issued a "best of" compilation, Fade to Grey – The Singles Collection, which included all the singles released to date and the previously unreleased "In the Year 2525". Although the album was certified Gold in the UK for pre-release sales to stores, it only peaked at No. 38 in the UK Albums Chart after its release in November 1983.

In 1984, with their contractual problems resolved, Visage returned with their third album, Beat Boy. Released in October 1984, the album was a critical and commercial failure, peaking at No. 79 in the UK. Two singles from the album, "Love Glove" and "Beat Boy", also failed to make the UK top 40. By this time, Billy Currie and Dave Formula had also left the band (though they received a "special thanks" credit on the album sleeve for their input), leaving only Strange and Egan from the original line-up along with Steve Barnacle and new recruits Gary Barnacle (Steve Barnacle's brother) and Andy Barnett who also was a member of FM and ASAP. A decision to make Visage a live band instead of a strictly studio-based project also failed to meet with success and the band split in 1985. Their final release was a video compilation of the band's promotional videos and other footage, including Strange's 1983 trip to North Africa. The compilation does not include the original video for the "Love Glove" single which was filmed at a late-night Dockland location in London in 1984.

Following the demise of Visage, Strange and Barnacle then formed the short-lived band Strange Cruise with various other musicians, though this too proved unsuccessful. Visage returned to the charts once more when a Bassheads remix of "Fade to Grey" was a UK Top 40 hit in 1993.

=== Second incarnation (2002–2011) ===
Steve Strange reappeared on the music scene in 2002, after several years of heroin addiction and other personal problems. He performed several Visage songs on the Here and Now Xmas Tour – a revival of 1980s pop acts. Some time after the performance, Strange created a "Mark II" of Visage with people from several electronic bands and projects: Steven Young, Sandrine Gouriou and Rosie Harris from Seize and Ross Tregenza from Jetstream Lovers/Goteki. After the announcement of the formation of the new line-up and several television appearances, plans for reworking old material and releasing a new record made slow progress. An updated version of "Fade to Grey" was produced in 2005. In 2006, Strange also collaborated with the electronic duo Punx Soundcheck and provided vocals on the track "In the Dark", which was included on the duo's debut double album When Machines Ruled the World. The first Visage mk II track was released in 2007, entitled "Diary of a Madman". Written by Strange with Visage mk II member Ross Tregenza, the track was co-produced by original Visage member Dave Formula. This song was made available for download from their official website in return for a donation to the charity Children in Need. No further new material surfaced from this line-up.

The long-since deleted Visage VHS video collection was repackaged for release on DVD in 2006, though it was mistakenly titled Visage Live.

In 2008, Strange (and Visage II keyboardist Sandrine Gouriou) made an appearance in the BBC drama series Ashes to Ashes which is set in 1981. In it, they performed the song "Fade to Grey" in a scene set in the "Blitz" nightclub.

In 2009, Strange and Egan appeared in Living TV's Pop Goes the Band, a series in which pop stars from the 1980s are given a complete makeover in return for a one-off performance. The Visage episode aired on 16 March 2009, and was the first time that the two men had spoken in over 20 years. The episode focused (like others in the series) more on getting them fit in the gym than on the current state of their relationship, though they appeared to get on well enough. At the culmination of the episode, they performed "Fade to Grey".

In 2010, new remixes of "Fade to Grey" were produced by club DJs Michael Gray and Lee Mortimer to celebrate the 30th anniversary of the song. The remixes were included on a new compilation album, The Face – The Very Best of Visage, which was released in March 2010.

=== Final incarnation (2012–2015) ===
On 8 January 2013, Strange appeared as a guest on the Channel 4 News programme to discuss the forthcoming David Bowie album The Next Day. During the interview he mentioned that a new Visage album was also due for release in 2013.

Also on 8 January 2013, Visage launched their new website, Twitter, Facebook and SoundCloud accounts and announced their new line-up, consisting of Steve Strange, former Visage bassist Steve Barnacle, former Ultravox guitarist Robin Simon, and Lauren Duvall on vocals. A single from the album, "Shameless Fashion", was made available as a free download from the band's Facebook page, and a physical CD-single was released on 6 May 2013. The band's new album, Hearts and Knives, was released on 20 May 2013. A second single from the album, "Dreamer I Know", was released in July 2013, and a third single, "Never Enough", was released in December. Throughout the second half of 2013, the band also embarked on a series of live dates in the UK and Europe. "Hidden Sign" was the fourth single to be taken from Hearts and Knives, released in May 2014 and "She's Electric (Coming Around)" was released as the fifth and final single in August 2014.

In December 2014, Visage released Orchestral, a mostly live album containing twelve Visage songs remade with a symphony orchestra. A single of the orchestral version of "Fade To Grey" was released ahead of the album in November 2014.

On 12 February 2015, frontman Steve Strange died of a heart attack while on holiday in Egypt, aged 55. While Strange's death ultimately meant the end of Visage, the band completed the album they had already been working on with Strange prior to his death. On 2 September 2015, an organisation known as The Steve Strange Collective was announced. Run by Strange's friends and relatives, they oversaw the release of the final Visage album, Demons to Diamonds, on 6 November 2015.

== Former members ==
- Steve Strange – lead vocals (1978–1985, 2002–2015; his death)
- Rusty Egan – drums, percussion (1978–1985)
- Midge Ure – guitar, synthesisers (1978–1982)
- Billy Currie – keyboards, synthesiser, violin (1978–1984)
- Dave Formula – keyboards, synthesiser (1978–1984)
- John McGeoch – guitar, saxophone (1978–1981; died 2004)
- Barry Adamson – bass (1978–1979)
- Steve Barnacle – bass (1982–1985, 2012–2015)
- Gary Barnacle – saxophone (1984–1985)
- Andy Barnett – guitar (1984–1985)
- Sandrine Gouriou – keyboards, synthesiser, vocals (2002–2010)
- Rosie Harris – keyboards, synthesiser, vocals (2002–2010)
- Ross Tregenza – keyboards, synthesiser, vocals (2004–2010)
- Steven Young – keyboards, synthesiser, vocals (2004–2010)
- Lauren Duvall – vocals (2012–2015)
- Logan Sky – keyboards, synthesizer (2012–2015)
- Robin Simon – guitar (2012–2015)

== Discography ==
Studio albums

- Visage (1980)
- The Anvil (1982)
- Beat Boy (1984)
- Hearts and Knives (2013)
- Demons to Diamonds (2015)
