= Dave Formula =

English musician (born 1946)

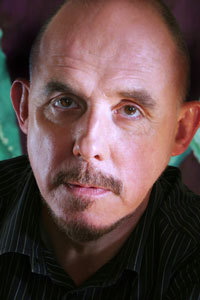
- Formula in 2007

Background information
- Also known as: David Tomlinson, Dave Tomlinson, Dave Formula
- Born: David Tomlinson; 11 August 1946 (age 80); Whalley Range, Manchester, England
- Genres: Rock, beat, post-punk, synthpop, new wave, electronic, jazz, funk
- Instruments: Keyboards, synthesizer
- Years active: 1965–present
- Labels: Decca Records, Virgin, EMI, Polydor
- Website: Dave Formula's official MySpace site wire-sound: Dave Formula

Dave Formula (born David Tomlinson; 11 August 1946, Whalley Range, Manchester in England), is an English keyboardist and film-soundtrack composer from Manchester, who played with the post-punk bands Magazine and Visage during the end of the 1970s and the beginning of the 1980s and in the "world music" band The Angel Brothers.

== Biography ==
=== Early years and St. Louis Union ===
Formula grew up in Whalley Range, Manchester.

He initially worked under his real name of David Tomlinson, achieving some success in the mid-1960s with the R&B blues/soul band St. Louis Union, including appearances on TV shows Top of the Pops and Thank Your Lucky Stars and in the film The Ghost Goes Gear (which also featured The Spencer Davis Group). At the time he formed the group, he was working as an apprentice television engineer with John Nichols, the band’s bass player. Later he worked as a cabaret musician. Before moving to London during his stint in Magazine, he shared a flat with record producer Martin Hannett.

=== Magazine ===
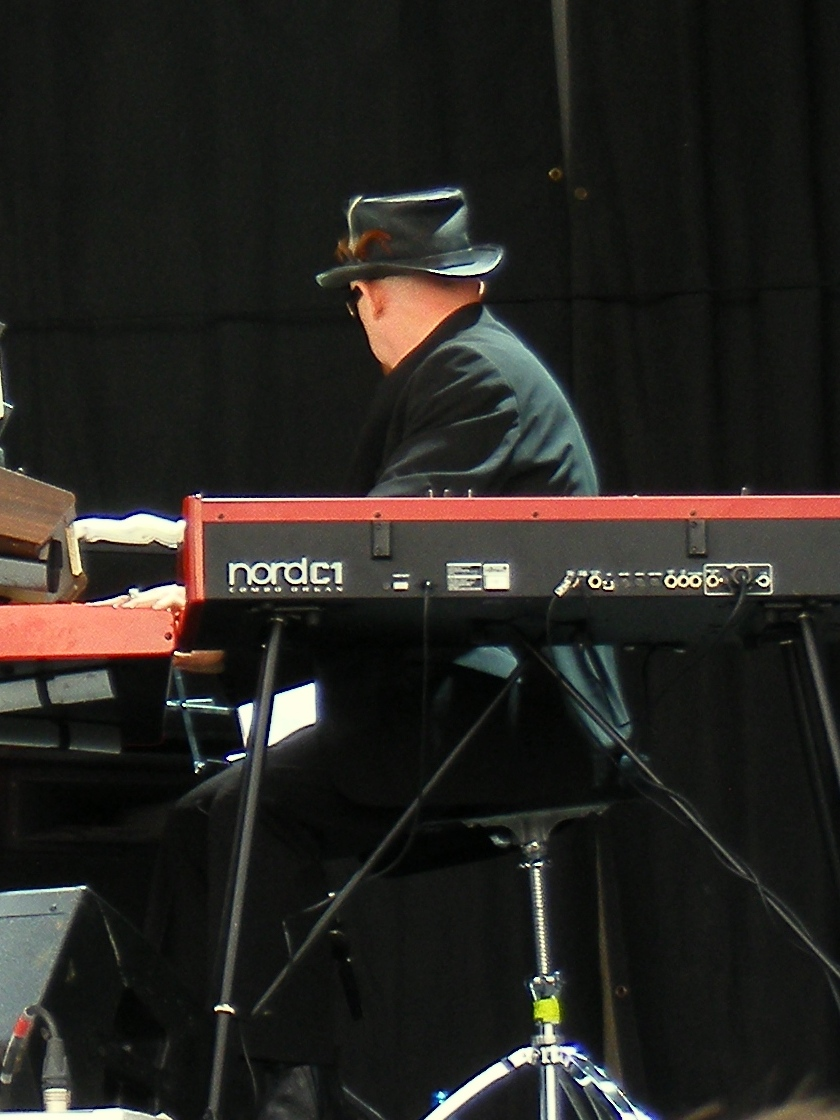
Formula performing with Magazine at the Hop Farm Festival in Paddock Wood, Kent, 2011

Formula was a member of Magazine, joining in 1978 following the departure of Bob Dickinson and the release of their debut single "Shot By Both Sides" and remaining until the band's breakup in 1981. His multi-layered keyboard sounds, made with equipment including the Yamaha CP70 electric grand piano, Yamaha YC45D Organ, an ARP Odyssey, a Yamaha SS30 string synth, and on later albums a Prophet 5, were a defining part of the band.

Magazine reformed in February 2009 with Formula returning to play keyboards.

=== Visage ===
Formula joined New Romantic ensemble Visage with Magazine's John McGeoch and Barry Adamson in 1978; he played on their first two albums, Visage and The Anvil. He left the group in 1983 after having some differences with drummer Rusty Egan regarding the musical style of their third album.

=== Ludus ===
Formula was a performing and songwriting member of Ludus in 1982 and remained for at least five years.

=== Inaura ===
He also joined a band called Inaura in the mid-1990s and played on their album One Million Smiles.

=== The Angel Brothers ===
Whilst lecturing in popular music, he met up with Keith Angel, Dave Angel & Andy Seward which eventually led to Formula joining the world music band The Angel Brothers in 2003, playing on their two albums, Punjab To Pit Top and Forbidden Fruit.

=== Design For Living ===
After Formula's stint with Magazine, he formed part of a band called Design For Living.

=== Solo album ===
In January 2007, Formula began working on a solo album recording at his own Red Bird Studios. Entitled Satellite Sweetheart, it features over 30 guest musicians. The list includes almost all the members of Magazine–Howard Devoto, Barry Adamson, John Doyle, John McGeoch (posthumously), and Robin Simon-as well singer/ songwriter Robert Wyatt, Swing Out Sister's Corrine Drury, Dennis Rollins, and Joel Purnell. The release was delayed due to Magazine's 2009 activity and the album was released in February 2010 on Wire Sound. A video of the collaboration with Devoto; "Via Sacra" is posted on YouTube.

== Discography ==
- Satellite Sweetheart (February 2010)
