= Steve Strange =

Welsh singer and nightclub host (1959–2015)

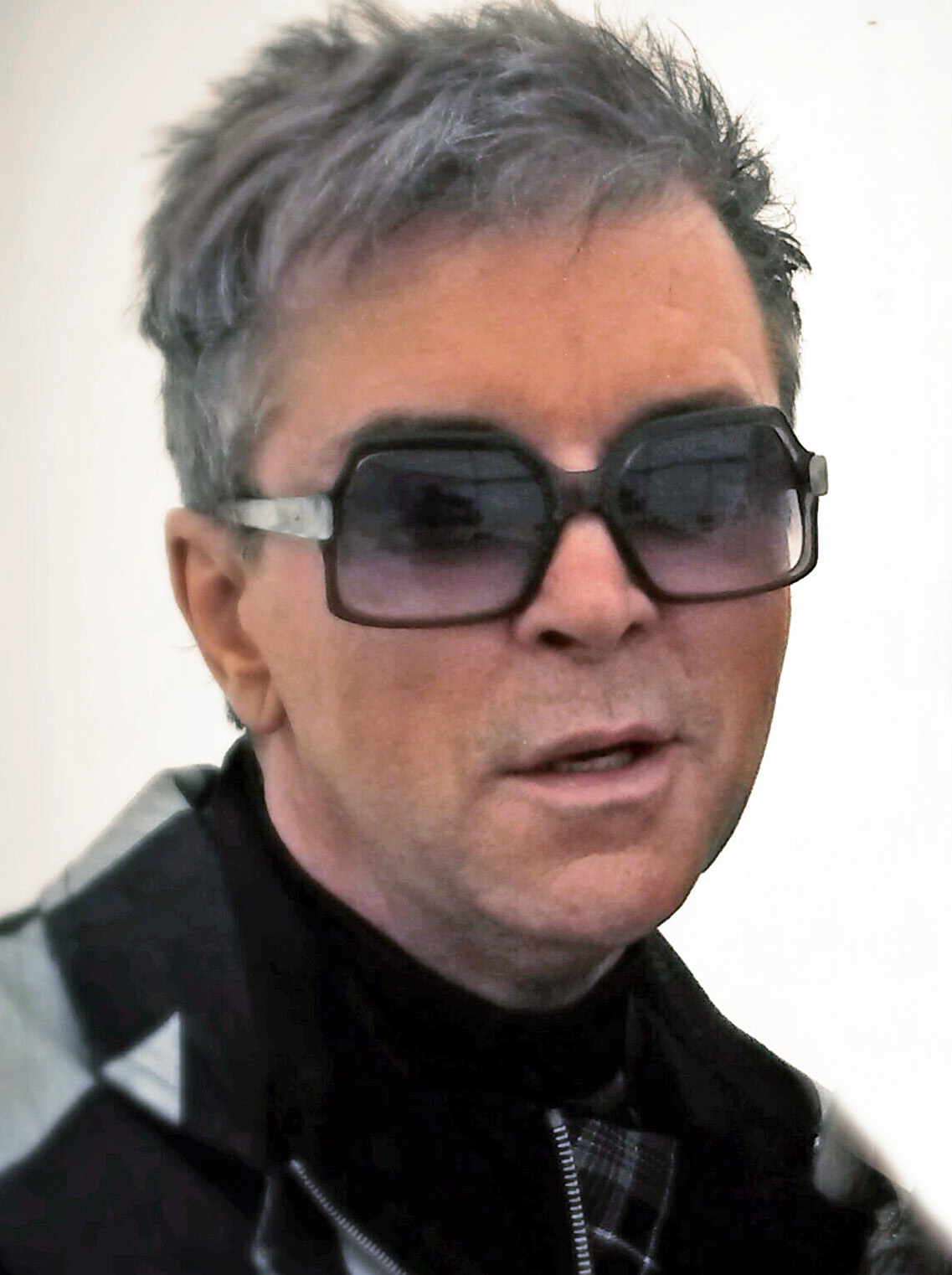
- Strange before performing at the closing ceremony of the 2014 Ski Flying World Championships, Harrachov, Czech Republic

Background information
- Born: Stephen John Harrington; 28 May 1959; Newbridge, Caerphilly, Wales
- Died: 12 February 2015 (aged 55) Sharm el-Sheikh, Egypt
- Genres: New wave; synth-pop
- Years active: 1977–1986, 2002–2015
- Labels: Polydor; EMI

Stephen John Harrington (28 May 1959 – 12 February 2015), known professionally as Steve Strange, was a Welsh singer and nightclub host and promoter. Strange began his career in several short-lived punk bands of the late 1970s. Quickly becoming disaffected by the British punk scene, he became one of the most influential figures behind the New Romantic subcultural movement of the late 1970s and early 1980s, which spawned the Blitz Kids.

Strange was the lead vocalist of the new wave synth-pop group Visage, which had five top 30 songs on the UK singles chart between 1981 and 1982, including their highest-charting single "Fade to Grey", which reached no. 8 in February 1981.

== Early life ==
Harrington was born in Newbridge, Wales. His grandfather moved with his family to Aldershot, Hampshire, where Strange's father was serving in the British Army as a paratrooper. The family moved back to Wales and lived in Rhyl, Denbighshire, on the north coast, where his parents bought a large guest house and opened sea front cafés. His parents divorced and Harrington moved back to Newbridge with his mother, where he attended Newbridge Grammar School. The school merged with a secondary school to form Newbridge Comprehensive School, a year after he arrived there, and he subsequently lost interest in all subjects but art.

== Career ==
=== Punk era ===
After attending a Sex Pistols concert at the Castle Cinema in Caerphilly in 1976, Harrington befriended the bass player Glen Matlock. He then arranged gigs for punk bands in his home town and got to know Jean-Jacques Burnel of the Stranglers before leaving for London. Here he worked for Malcolm McLaren and formed a punk band called the Moors Murderers with Soo Catwoman. Additional members included future Pretenders frontwoman Chrissie Hynde, future Clash drummer Topper Headon, future Psychedelic Furs drummer Vince Ely and The Kid (who was formerly in Adam and the Ants, as Mark Ryan). They recorded a song called "Free Hindley". After several gigs, the band split up around early 1978.

Later in 1978, Harrington briefly joined the punk/new wave band the Photons (originally from Liverpool) as vocalist and co-songwriter at the behest of David Littler (ex-Spitfire Boys). The band were managed by punk impresario Andy Czezowski.

=== Visage ===
Shortly after leaving the Photons, and using the alias Steve Strange, Harrington joined Visage, with Rusty Egan and Midge Ure from Rich Kids, Billy Currie from Ultravox, and Barry Adamson, John McGeoch and Dave Formula from Magazine. Intended as a studio-based side project, they signed to the small label Radar Records and released their first single "Tar" in 1979. The single was not a success, but the following year, Strange appeared in the video for David Bowie's No. 1 hit "Ashes to Ashes", a song which helped to propel the burgeoning New Romantic fashion movement into the mainstream. Later that year, Visage signed a new record deal with the major label Polydor and released their second single, "Fade to Grey". The single became a top 10 hit in the UK and several other European countries, reaching number one in Germany and Switzerland. As the public face of the band, Strange shot to stardom in Britain and other parts of Europe. Visage enjoyed a string of hit singles and two hit albums before later commercial disappointments led to their break-up in 1985.

After the dissolution of Visage, Strange formed the short-lived band Strange Cruise with Wendy Wu (formerly of the Photos). The group signed with EMI Records and released two singles and an album in 1986, though failed to gain any chart success.

=== Club host ===
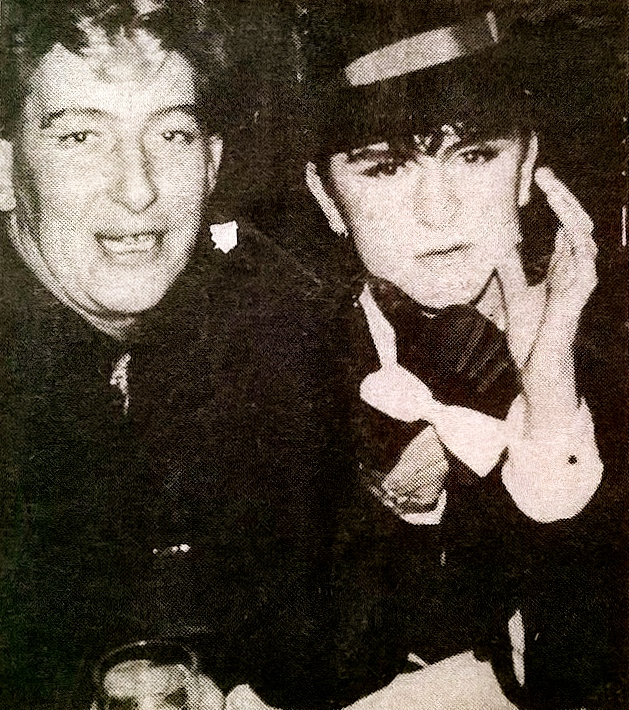
Steve at the opening of Dj Tallulah's Circus Circus club, London, in 1983 (Tallulah (left) and Strange (right))

In 1978, before their success with Visage, Strange and Visage partner Rusty Egan began to make a name for themselves as a nightclub host and DJ respectively. They began organising "Bowie nights" on Tuesdays at Billy's club in Soho, before taking over Tuesdays at the Blitz wine bar in London's Covent Garden in 1979, which became the iconic Blitz Club. Adhering to Strange's strict door policy of admitting only "the weird and wonderful", the club took off and became an essential location in the rise of what would become the New Romantic movement. Strange's door policy was so strict that he famously once refused admittance to Mick Jagger, though Strange would later claim this was because the club was filled to capacity on the night in question and they had already been warned about breaching fire regulations. Following the Blitz, Strange and Egan then fronted the "Club for Heroes" in London's Baker Street on Tuesdays and Thursdays in 1981, before moving to the Camden Palace nightclub in 1982 for two years, which became one of the most famous venues of the era, attracting major celebrities on a regular basis. Their next club venture, "The Playground" in 1984, was less successful.

Later in the 1980s, Strange went to Ibiza, Spain, and became an integral part of the budding trance club movement and hosting parties for celebrities such as Sylvester Stallone. In the early 1990s, he was the host at the "Double Bass" club in Ibiza.

=== Visage Mk II ===
In 2002, Strange took part in the Here and Now Tour, which featured a revival of various 80s pop acts. In 2004, he then formed a new version of Visage, dubbed Visage Mk II, with various musicians from modern electronic bands. None of the other original members were involved in the project. With a plan to re-record some of the older, classic Visage tracks as well as produce some new material, the project never seemed to fully get off the ground despite some television appearances. The first Visage Mk II song was called "Diary of a Madman", which was made available for download in 2007 in return for a donation to the Children in Need appeal. However, after this, no further material from this version of the band surfaced.

In 2006, Strange collaborated with electronic music duo Punx Soundcheck for their album When Machines Rules the World, co-writing and performing on the track "In the Dark".

=== The Detroit Starrzz and Visage (Mk III) ===
In February 2012, Strange was a guest on the ITV chat show Loose Women. He said he was still working on a new Visage album and that nine tracks had been completed. In early 2013, Strange announced another new version of Visage featuring himself and former member Steve Barnacle, along with former Ultravox guitarist Robin Simon and vocalist Lauren Duvall. A new album, Hearts and Knives, was released in May 2013 (the first new Visage album in 29 years). In support of the album, the band made several live appearances in the UK and Europe in 2013.

Parallel to recording new Visage material, Strange was also involved in another music project, the Detroit Starrzz. The group, which consisted of Strange and various DJ/remixers, released their first single, "Halo", in 2011. While appearing on the chat show Loose Women in February 2012, Strange stated he had recorded a full album with the group, with another single, "Aiming For Gold", to be released later in 2012. The group played at the Citrus Club in Edinburgh on 3 February 2012.

At the time of his death in February 2015, Strange was in the midst of making a second album with the current Visage line-up. The album, Demons to Diamonds, was completed by the band after he died and released in November 2015.

== Later years ==
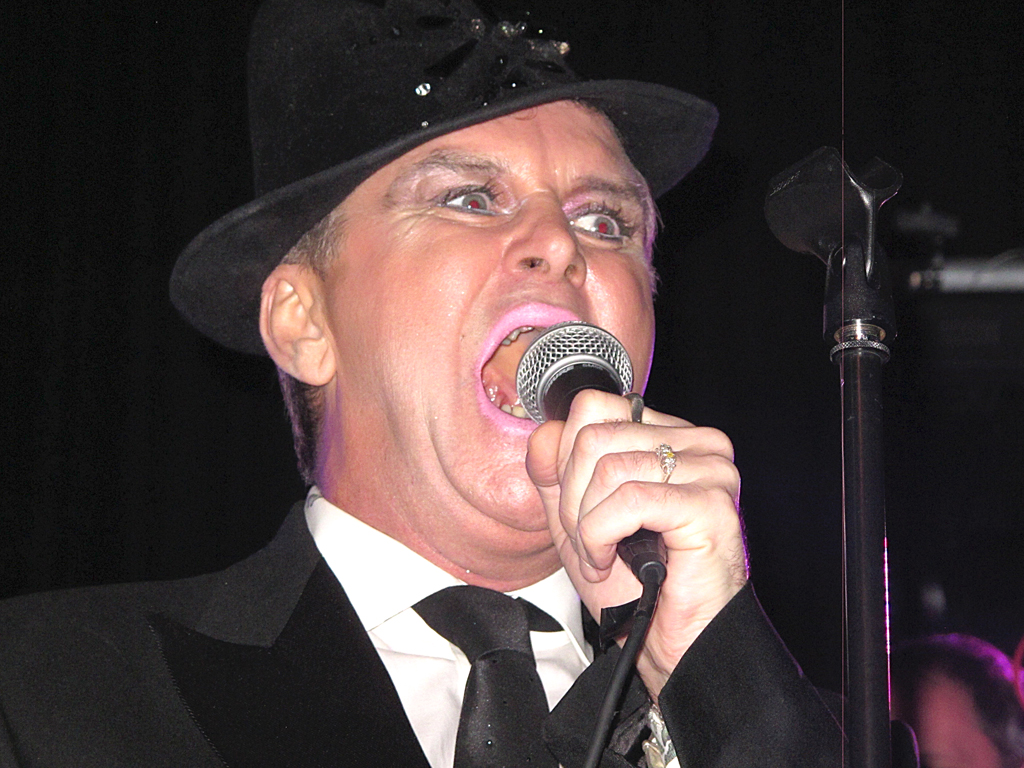
Strange with Visage in 2014

Strange was portrayed in Boy George's 2002 stage musical Taboo, which reflected on the London club scene of the mid-1980s.

During the mid-1990s, Strange promoted nights at the Emporium nightclub in Soho, London.

In 2005, Strange appeared in a Channel 4 documentary called Whatever Happened to the Gender Benders?, which reflected on the advent of the New Romantic movement of the early 1980s and the prominent roles that Strange, Boy George and Marilyn each played within it.

In November 2006, Strange took part in, and went on to win, the BBC reality series for Children in Need's Celebrity Scissorhands. He returned to the show in 2007 and 2008 as Assistant Manager/Image Consultant. In that role, he was in charge of the catwalk, showing all of the best haircuts of the series and also people dressed in 1980s style clothing and make-up.

In 2008, Strange (and Visage II keyboardist Sandrine Gouriou) made an appearance in the BBC drama series Ashes to Ashes, which is set in 1981. In it, they performed the song "Fade to Grey" in a scene set in the Blitz nightclub.

In 2009, Strange and Rusty Egan appeared in Living TV's Pop Goes the Band, a series in which pop stars from the 1980s are given a complete makeover in return for a one-off performance. The Visage episode aired on 16 March 2009, and was the first time that the two men had spoken in over 20 years. The episode focused (like others in the series) more on getting them fit in the gym than on the current state of their relationship, though they appeared to get on well enough. At the culmination of the episode, they performed "Fade to Grey".

In 2010, Strange was portrayed by actor Marc Warren in the BBC programme Worried About the Boy, a dramatisation of Boy George's rise to fame. Although the programme was set in the early 1980s, when Strange was in his early 20s, Warren was 43 at the time of production.

In January 2011, Strange and Rusty Egan reopened the Blitz Club for one night, with performances from Roman Kemp's band Paradise Point and electro punk artist Quilla Constance plus DJ sets from Egan himself.

In January 2013, Strange appeared on the Channel 4 News discussing the forthcoming release of David Bowie's album The Next Day.

In 2014, he collaborated with Italian synthwave producer Bottin on the song "Poison Within".

In his final years, he lived with his family in the South Wales seaside town of Porthcawl.

== Personal life ==
Steve Strange was bisexual as he had relationships with both men and women.

For many years, Strange was addicted to heroin. In later years, he suffered a nervous breakdown, and in November 1999, he was arrested for shoplifting—he was caught stealing a Teletubbies doll for his nephew. In court, he was found guilty and given a three-month suspended sentence. The British media publicised the case of a pop star who had fallen on hard times.

In 2002, Strange published his autobiography, Blitzed!, in which he spoke openly about his career, his heroin addiction, his nervous breakdown, his sexuality, and his attempts to get his life back together.

== Death ==
On 12 February 2015, Strange suffered a heart attack, at the age of 55, while in Sharm el-Sheikh, Egypt; he died later that day in hospital.

Spandau Ballet (who also started their musical career in the Blitz Club founded by Strange) dedicated their performance at the Sanremo Music Festival in Italy later that night to Strange. The family held a high-profile funeral in Porthcawl which was attended by many prominent figures from the entertainment industry and was videoed. His coffin was carried by Boy George, Jayce Lewis and Spandau Ballet brothers Martin and Gary Kemp; the funeral concluded with a burial at Jubilee Gardens Cemetery. A fundraising project, named The Steve Strange Collective, was set up by Strange's family and friends, with a view to having a statue of him made in his hometown. The statue did not materialise, but a heart-shaped gravestone, paid for by the Collective, was unveiled in Porthcawl in December 2015.
