= Rusty Egan =

- Born: 19 September 1957 (age 68)
- Origin: Ireland
- Genres: Punk rock; synth-pop; new wave
- Years active: 1977–present
- Label: EMI

Rusty Egan (born 19 September 1957 in London) is a British-Irish musician and DJ.

Egan was the drummer of British new wave band Rich Kids, from its inception in March 1977, until its disbandment in December 1978, along with former Sex Pistols bassist Glen Matlock (bass and vocals), Steve New (guitar and vocals), and Midge Ure (guitar, vocals, and keyboards).

Egan continued working with Ure, and later collaborated with The Misfits, Skids and Shock, and well as being a founding member of Visage. He played drums on a remixed version of Phil Lynott's song "Yellow Pearl", which the BBC used as the Top of the Pops theme tune from 1981 to 1986.

== Career ==
Egan was the DJ at Blitz, the influential New Romantic nightclub in London, where he worked with Steve Strange from 1979 until 1981. During this period, he played electronic music and synthpop by acts such as Kraftwerk, Yellow Magic Orchestra, Eno, Ultravox, and Landscape for the British club scene, helping to establish the musical style of the scene. Egan also owned The Cage, a New Romantic-era record store on London's King's Road. As the club grew in popularity, Egan began to be recognised as a central figure in London's nightlife. In 1981, Egan was also a DJ at Croc's, in Rayleigh, Essex, where he was instrumental in getting the electronic synth-pop band Depeche Mode a regular gig on Thursday nights at the club.

In 1982, he, Strange and Kevin Millins opened up the Camden Palace nightclub in London, where he continued to spread and influence the development of electronica in the UK. For a time, he switched to producing records for many of the bands he used to DJ, including Spear of Destiny, Shock, Visage and The Senate.

On 13 June 2008, Egan appeared DJing at the 'Big Top' as part of the Isle of Wight Festival.

Egan appeared alongside former Visage bandmate Steve Strange on makeover show Pop Goes the Band in early 2009 on Living TV.

Egan won the category for lifetime achievement at the 2009 Viagra Awards.

In January 2011, Egan and Strange hosted Return to the Blitz on the site of the original Blitz Club with performances from Roman Kemp's band Paradise Point and electro punk artist Quilla Constance plus DJ sets from Egan himself.

2017 saw the release of Egan's first solo album, 'Welcome to the Dancefloor'. It featured appearances from Midge Ure, Tony Hadley, Peter Hook and Erik Stein of Cult With No Name. The album was subsequently released in remix form as 'Welcome to the Remix' and 'Welcome to the Beach'.

On Friday 18 October 2019, Rusty performed a DJ set overlaid with a commentary of the post punk music scene at the London Palladium, followed by a performance of a number of Visage hits with Midge Ure.

In 2025, 'Rusty Egan: The Autobiography' was published by McNidder Grace. Cold War Night Life described the book as "Chaotic, disorganised, narcissistic, hard to follow, but occasionally capable of raising a laugh." Louder Than War said that the book "adds a valuable missing piece to the story of British music."

== Personal life ==
Egan married freelance dancer Miranda Davis in July 1986.
