= List of New Romantics =

This is a list of artists and people who were either part of or linked to the New Romantic scene of the late 1970s and early 80s. This list does not include little-known local bands or individuals. Bands are listed by the first letter in their name (not including articles such as "a", "an", or "the"). Individuals are listed by last name.

== B ==
- Berlin Blondes
- Boy George

== C ==
- Classix Nouveaux

== D ==
- Duran Duran

== E ==
- Endgames

== M ==
- Marilyn
- The Mood

== P ==
- Princess Julia

== S ==
- Philip Sallon
- Shock
- Spandau Ballet
- Steve Strange

== T ==
- Techno Twins

== V ==
- Visage
