= Blitz Kids (New Romantics) =

Group that launched the New Romantic subculture

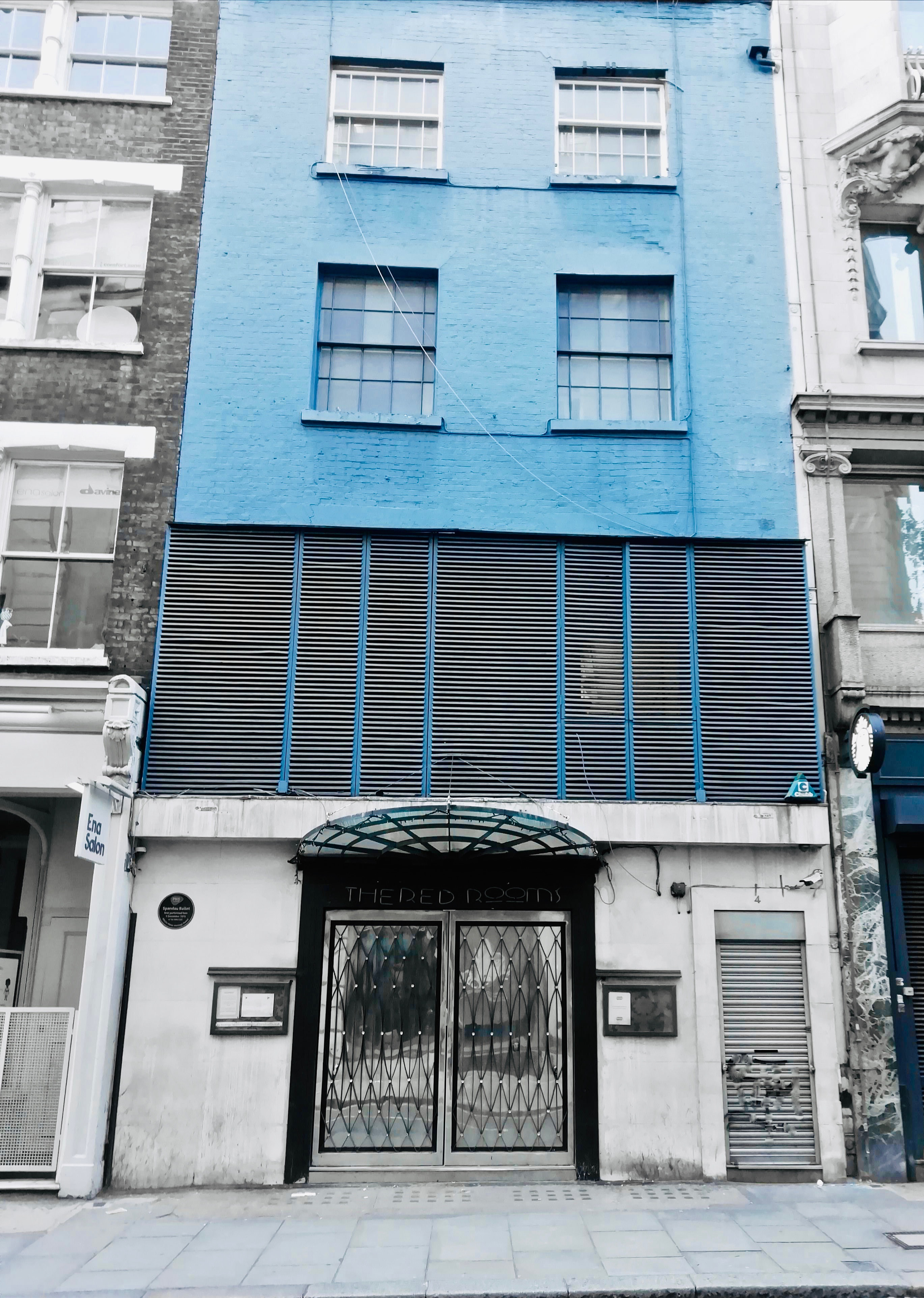
The former home of Blitz nightclub (1979), 4 Great Queen Street, Covent Garden, London, WC2

The Blitz Kids was a group of people who frequented the Tuesday club-night at Blitz in Covent Garden, London in 1979–1980, and is credited with launching the New Romantic subcultural movement.

== History ==
Steve Strange and Rusty Egan co-hosted these exclusive nights without giving them a name, according to Strange's autobiography, and publicised them solely by word of mouth. An emphasis on style was ensured by enforcing a strict dress code at the door. Crucially, the Blitz lay between two art colleges (St Martin's School and Central School) and it became a testbed for student fashion designers during the 1980s.

These included Stephen Jones, David Holah, Stevie Stewart, Darla Jane Gilroy, Michele Clapton, Stephen Linard, among others. The Blitz began making headlines thanks to its patrons' styles of clothes and make-up for both sexes, subsequently documented by Gary Kemp in his 2009 first-person book, I Know This Much; by Graham Smith and Chris Sullivan in their 2011 book We Can Be Heroes: London Clubland 1976-1984; and ultimately by David Johnson’s nationwide survey, Nightlife Rebels: How New Romantics Ignited the 80s, Featuring photographs by Derek Ridgers.

Other core attendees included Boy George, Marilyn, Alice Temple, Perri Lister, Princess Julia, Philip Sallon, Martin Degville (later to be the frontman of Tony James' Sigue Sigue Sputnik), Siobhan Fahey (later a member of Bananarama), Biddie and Eve (long-standing cabaret act at the Blitz as wine bar), Perry Haines (who became co-editor of the earliest issues of i-D magazine) and Chris Sullivan (who founded and ran the Wag club in Soho for 19 years).

Strange, as greeter, and Egan, as DJ, came together at Billy's nightclub in Soho in autumn 1978, when the post-punk generation found themselves bored with the nihilist punk genre, as Smith and Sullivan record. Strange and Egan introduced regular Roxy Music and David Bowie nights at Billy's and, in an effort to find something new and colourful, the denizens took to wearing bizarre home-made costumes and clothing and emphatic make-up, presenting a highly androgynous appearance.

After three months, disagreements with the owner prompted them to move on from Billy's – which had effectively formalised the once-a-week club-night. Helen Robinson, who ran the shop PX as the flagship for New Romantic ready-to-wear in Covent Garden, employed Strange as an assistant and it was she who encouraged him and Egan to transfer their energies in 1979 to the more elitist Blitz wine bar in Great Queen Street. Over the next 20 months their fashion-led Tuesday club-night was gradually acknowledged in the media as home to the New Romantic movement and prompted the "Blitz Kids" epithet in mainstream newspapers, led by the Daily Mirror on 3 March 1980.

In mid-1980, David Bowie visited the club and asked Strange and three other Blitz regulars to appear in the video for his single "Ashes to Ashes", which helped to propel the New Romantic movement into the mainstream.

== Subcultural outcomes ==
The Blitz club provided roots for several new pop groups, notably Visage with Steve Strange on vocals and Blitz DJ Rusty Egan on drums, then Spandau Ballet who played live gigs there in 1979 and 1980. Later, Blitz cloakroom attendant George O'Dowd became internationally famous in his own right as Boy George fronting Culture Club. Marilyn became a singer, but with limited chart success.

Boy George celebrated the Blitz Kids scene in his 2002 musical Taboo, in which he played the part of Leigh Bowery, who hosted London's weekly club-night called Taboo in 1985-87, long after the Blitz closed.

In January 2011, Steve Strange and Rusty Egan threw a one-off reunion party on the site of the original Blitz Club, with performances from Roman Kemp's band Paradise Point and electro punk artist Quilla Constance, plus DJ sets from Egan himself. Egan simultaneously launched an official Blitz Club website incorporating a record label, which published three remixes in as many years.

In 2017, the National Portrait Gallery acquired portraits of Blitz Kids Stephen Linard, David Holah, John Maybury and Cerith Wyn Evans by photographer David Gwinnutt, which were displayed in the exhibition Before We Were Men.

In March 2021, Bruce Ashley's documentary Blitzed: The 80's Blitz Kids' Story, was shown on Sky Arts. Boy George, Rusty Egan and Marilyn all appeared in the film discussing their time at the club and about the early 1980s-era, whilst La Roux was interviewed about the cultural effects of the New Romantic movement on younger performers like herself.

== List of prominent Blitz Kids ==
- Rusty Egan (Visage member and DJ/co-founder of the Blitz Club)
- Steve Strange (Visage member and co-founder of the Blitz Club)
- Michele Clapton (costume designer)
- Michael Clark (dancer)
- Martin Degville (Sigue Sigue Sputnik)
- Robert Elms (writer for The Face and NME, now a radio presenter)
- Siobhan Fahey (Bananarama)
- Kate Garner (Haysi Fantayzee)
- Boy George (Culture Club member and cloakroom assistant at the Blitz Club)
- Tony Hadley (Spandau Ballet)
- Jeremy Healy (Haysi Fantayzee)
- Tony James (Sigue Sigue Sputnik)
- Stephen Jones (milliner)
- Princess Julia (DJ)
- John Keeble (Spandau Ballet)
- Gary Kemp (Spandau Ballet)
- Martin Kemp (Spandau Ballet)
- Stephen Linard (fashion designer)
- Perri Lister (Hot Gossip)
- Marilyn (singer)
- Steve Norman (Spandau Ballet)
- Gene October (Chelsea)
- Sade (singer)
- Philip Sallon (socialite)
- Tallulah (DJ)
- Bev Sage (Techno Twins)
- Steve Fairnie (Techno Twins)
- Alice Temple (singer/model)
- Midge Ure (Visage member and singer with Ultravox – starting with their 4th album)

== Literature ==
- Elms, Robert (2025). Blitz: The Club that Created the Eighties. London: Faber & Faber. ISBN 9780571394180.
- Johnson, David (2025). Nightlife Rebels: How New Romantics Ignited the 80s, Featuring photographs by Derek Ridgers. London: Johnson@shapersofthe80s.com. ISBN 0-75284-7201.
- Kemp, Gary (2009). I Know This Much: From Soho to Spandau. London: Fourth Estate. ISBN 978-0-00-732330-2.
- Smith, Graham; Sullivan, Chris (2011). We Can Be Heroes: London Clubland 1976-1984. London: Unbound. ISBN 978-1-908717-04-7.
- Strange, Steve (2002). Blitzed!. London: Orion Books. ISBN 0-75284-7201.
