= Chisenhale Dance Space =

British charitable organisation

- Chisenhale Dance Space
- Interactive map of Chisenhale Dance Space
- Address: 64 – 84 Chisenhale Road, London, E3 5QZ; London
- Coordinates: 51.5330°N 0.0396°W

Construction
- Opened: 1984

Website
- http://www.chisenhaledancespace.co.uk

Chisenhale Dance Space is a British, member-led charitable organisation based in east London. It provides rehearsal and performance space for independent dancers.

It was founded in the early 1980s by members of the X6 Dance Collective who were originally housed in Butler's Wharf It officially opened as a public performance space in December 1984, supported by well-known dancer and choreographer Gill Clarke.

The organisation is based on the top floor of a former veneer factory near Victoria Park in the London Borough of Tower Hamlets. The space comprises offices, dance studios and a 75-seater theatre and performance space which is available for professional and community use. Chisenhale Gallery and Chisenhale Art Place are situated in the same former factory.

The Chisenhale Dance Space focus is artist development, experimentation, research, and the creation of new dance and movement works. Their projects consist of artist development programmes and community outreach, such as Inspiring Young Londoners Through Dance, which was part of the Transformers scheme to celebrate the 2012 Summer Olympics.

The theatre space is used for dance festivals, live performances and dance-related film screenings. The space's 30th anniversary film programme included a screening of Hail the New Puritan – a fictionalised documentary starring Michael Clark and directed by Charles Atlas – which was filmed in Chisenhale Dance Space.

Chisenhale Dance Space is part of the Tower Hamlets Dance Partnership. The other members are East London Dance, Green Candle Dance Company, Trinity Laban Conservatoire of Music and Dance and Central Foundation Girls' School.
