= Hype (board game) =

1985 board game

Box cover with sticker for included vinyl single by The Technos, 1984

Hype is a board game published by Virgin Games, Ltd. in 1985 that simulates the rise of unknown rock bands in the music industry.

== Description ==
Publicity photo for Hype with Bev Sage and Steve Fairnie of The Technos

Hype is a game in which each player begins a pop band and must take their band from performing local shows and recording demos to getting a record deal and flying to gigs on a jet-plane. The first player to get a Number 1 hit is the winner.

== History ==
The game was conceived in 1980 by Steve Fairnie, lead singer for the British post-punk bands Writz and The Technos. Fairnie recruited Willie Williams, at the time the editor of Punty fanzine but soon to become the set designer and lighting director for U2. Together, Fairnie and Williams designed the game, and pitched the idea to new games publisher Virgin Games. The result was Hype, a game featuring a circular board and high quality components that was released in 1984. In addition to the lavish game pieces, the game also included a 12" vinyl record by The Technos.

However, the expensive components resulted in a hefty price tag of £20, and the game was not a commercial success.

== Reception ==
In Issue 23 of Imagine, Dave Perry questioned its replayability but ultimately liked the game as an occasional diversion, saying, "After numerous playings the joke might lose its sparkle, but for an alternative to your usual gaming, or as a jaunt for the whole family, Hype has a lot going for it. So if you want to get hip, get Hype!"
