= Philip Sallon =

British socialite

- Born: 13 November 1951 (age 74); London, England
- Citizenship: British
- Education: Central Saint Martins
- Occupations: costume designer club promoter
- Years active: 1970s
- Parent(s): Ralph David Sallon; Anna Simon

Philip Sallon (born 1951) is a British socialite, event organiser, club promoter, style innovator, impresario, and clothing designer. He is particularly known for being a prominent member of the Punk sub-cultural and New Romantic pop cultural movements during the 1970s and 1980s.

== Early life and education ==
Philip Sallon was born in London in 1951, the grandson of Polish Jewish immigrant tailors who moved to the UK in 1904. His father, Ralph Sallon, was a well-known caricaturist who married his mother Anna Simon in 1945. They had one son (Philip) and three daughters. He was educated at Harrow County School, later renamed Gayton School. In 1970, he enrolled on an arts foundation course at East Ham College. In 1975, he applied and was offered a place at Saint Martin's School of Art to study fashion, but was expelled after one year for poor attendance. He then left St Martin's to pursue a career in theatre and, later on, club promotion.

== Career ==
In 1976, he applied for a job with the BBC's Costume Department and was taken on as an Assistant Costume Designer. During this time, he was a fixture at the famous punk club, Louise's, where he became friends with the Sex Pistols and Malcolm McLaren, and began associating with a clique of young punk fans dubbed the "Bromley Contingent".

After his work at the BBC, he then moved on to the Royal Opera House in 1982, where he was employed as a Costume Designer. During this period, he pursued his other interests, and is particularly known as an event organiser, DJ, and club promoter who has been a well-known fixture on the London club-scene since the 1970s through the early Punk movement and the New Romantic movement of the 1980s, during which time he also staged Vivienne Westwood's early catwalk shows and into the 1990s and beyond.

== Personal ==
Sallon can be described as one of the original 'gay punks'. He currently resides alone in St John's Wood, London.

In April 2011, he was the victim of a homophobic hate related crime when he was attacked in Piccadilly by two unknown male assailants.

== Blitz Kids ==
The Blitz Kids were a group of young people who frequented a weekly club-night at Blitz in Covent Garden, London in 1979–80, and are credited with starting the New Romantic sub-cultural movement. Sallon was a core member of the group that included the founders Rusty Egan and Steve Strange, and also included Boy George, Marilyn and Alice Temple, Perri Lister, Princess Julia, and Martin Degville (later to be the frontman of Tony James' Sigue Sigue Sputnik).

The Blitz club was located between two notable art colleges (St Martin's School and Central School) and became an experimental melting-pot for student fashion designers who influenced London fashion during the 1980s. Known fashion students who attended the club included Stephen Jones, David Holah, Stevie Stewart, John Galliano, and Darla Jane Gilroy.

== Club promotion ==
=== Planets ===
Sallon's first foray on his own into club promotion was in 1981 with the one-nighter called Planets in Piccadilly, where he employed a young (and then unknown) DJ called George O'Dowd, who later became Boy George. This club-night ran for six months.

=== The Mud Club ===
In January 1983, Sallon began hosting the infamous Mud Club on Fridays at 28 Leicester Square, (Sallon first Mud Club started off on Charing Cross?) launched with Malcolm McLaren. Here, The Face magazine named the Mud as one of London's four coolest weekend club-nights, before it subsequently moved on to Fooberts, and in 1984 to Busbys, next to the Astoria Charing Cross Road, where it ran until 1991. Sallon was known for his outrageous costumes and cutting personality. He scrutinised everyone entering the club and if you didn't look right or have the right attitude you would not be let in and told in no uncertain terms why you could not come in. The club's patrons were known for their sense of dressed-up decadence; the club's music policy was trashy disco played by original resident DJs Mark Moore, Tasty Tim and Jay Strongman.

=== Bagley's ===
In 1992, Sallon moved the Mud Club to Bagley's Warehouse, which was then known for holding the biggest capacity nights in London. Phillip Salon's Mud Club dominated Bagleys on Saturday nights, known for flamboyant clientele, staging productions of a large scale, designed by Gary Messider, and included such strange design elements such as washing-lines full of clothes above the dance-floor with housewife characters vacuuming on podiums. The club ran until 1996 when the event was replaced by Freedom.

== Selected stage productions ==
=== Taboo the Musical ===
Phillip Sallon is portrayed in Taboo the Musical, (2002), in which his character is the narrator; the show is based partly on the New Romantic scene of the 1980s. At its core is the life and career of colourful pop star Boy George (who rose to global prominence in the early 1980s with his band Culture Club) and his contemporaries, including performance artist and club promoter Leigh Bowery, pop-singer Marilyn, Blitz nightclub host Steve Strange (later of the electro-pop group Visage), and Philip Sallon, punk groupie and Mud Club promoter.

== Selected filmography ==
- Punk: Attitude (documentary by Don Letts, 2005), as himself.
- Hampstead Heath: The Musical (2005), appears as himself.
- Meet Pursuit Delange (2010), A short comedy film appears as Philip the Angel.
- The Battle of Soho, A documentary film dealing with the impact of gentrification on London he appears as himself in a featured interview.

== Sources ==
- Everett, William A. and Laird, Paul R. (2009), The A to Z of the Broadway Musical, Scarecrow Press, ISBN 9780810870444
- Hischak, Thomas S. (2008), The Oxford Companion to the American Musical: Theatre, Film, and Television, Oxford University Press, USA, ISBN 9780195335330
