= New Romantics (disambiguation) =

The New Romantic movement was a British pop-culture movement of the early 1980s, characterised by flamboyant, eccentric fashion.

New Romantics may also refer to:

- "New Romantics" (song), a 2014 song by Taylor Swift
- "New Romantics", a 2016 song by Hands Like Houses from Dissonants
- New Romantics, a putative grouping in British poetry from the 1930s to the 1950s.

== See also ==
- New Romance (disambiguation)
- List of New Romantics
- Neuromantic (album), an album by Yukihiro Takahashi
