= Shock (troupe) =

Music, mime, dance and pop group

Shock were a music/mime/dance/pop group that was notable in the early 1980s for supporting English new wave groups such as Gary Numan, Adam and the Ants, Depeche Mode and Famous Names, led by Steve Fairnie.

In 1979, mime artists Tim Dry and Barbie Wilde united with actors Robert Pereno and Lowri-Ann Richards and dancer Karen Sparks to produce Shock. In April 1980, they recruited another mime, Sean Crawford. The line-up changed again with the departure of Karen and the introduction of Carole Caplin.

Based in London, England, Shock performed in clubs such as The Haçienda, The Warehouse (Leeds) and The Blitz Club (home of the Blitz Kids) and The Venue (London). With costumes from Kahn & Bell (designers for Duran Duran), miming to music by Fad Gadget, Landscape, Kate Bush and Wilson Pickett, they were in the vanguard of the New Romantic cult of the early 1980s, alongside Boy George, Duran Duran, Steve Strange and Spandau Ballet.

Their first record, "Angel Face" on RCA Records – with production by Rusty Egan (Visage) and Richard James Burgess (Landscape) – was a dance floor hit, as was the second, "Dynamo Beat". In 1981, Shock co-starred with Ultravox at the 'People's Palace Valentine's Ball' at the Rainbow Theatre. Lowri-Ann, Barbie and Carole appeared in the video for Landscape's "Einstein A Go-Go". Sean and Barbie starred in the video for Ultravox's "Passing Strangers".

Shock went on to perform at The Ritz rock club in Manhattan and toured Europe and the Far East. Their biggest live concerts were in April 1981 with Gary Numan at Wembley Arena.

Shock eventually broke up and reformed as a foursome with Barbie, Tim, Sean and Carole and released the single "Dynamo Beat" on RCA Records. However, soon Tim and Sean broke away to form their own double act as Tik and Tok. Barbie went back to acting and TV presenting. Carole went on to become a lifestyle advisor to Cherie Blair.

== Discography ==
- "Angel Face" b/w "R.E.R.B." (1980) AUS #86
- "Dynamo Beat" b/w "Dream Games" (1981)
