= Alexander Hanson =

Alexander Hanson may refer to:

- Alexander Contee Hanson, American lawyer, publisher, and statesman
- A. M. Hanson (Alexander Mark Hanson, born 1969), artist and photographer
- Alexander Hanson (actor) (born 1961), British actor
- Alexander Contee Hanson Sr. (1749–1806), attorney and chancellor of Maryland
