= Kinky Gerlinky =

Coordinates: 51.5109°N 0.1303°W

- Interactive map of Kinky Gerlinky
- Address: Empire Ballroom; Leicester Square
- Location: London; England
- Operator: Michael Kostiff; Gerlinde Kostiff; Winn Austin
- Capacity: 3,000
- Type: Club night

Construction
- Opened: 1989–1994

Kinky Gerlinky was an influential British clubnight that began in 1989 at the Legends nightclub in London, England. It was hosted by fashion impresarios Michael and Gerlinde Costiff and co-hosted by Winn Austin. The club night ended in 1994 following the sudden death of one of the organisers, Gerlinde Costiff.

== History ==
Kinky Gerlinky was an influential British clubnight that began in 1989 in London, hosted by fashion impresarios Michael and Gerlinde Costiff and hosted by Winn Austin. Following in the footsteps of 80s clubs such as the Blitz and Taboo, Kinky Gerlinky was where clubbing culture met outrageous fashion and 'out there' drag. Whilst primarily regarded as a gay club, it was actually one that attracted revellers of all sexualities as well as genders and races.

Kinky Gerlinky took place monthly in the West End, starting life at Legends, then the Café de Paris, before moving onto Shaftesbury's, and finally the Empire Ballroom in Leicester Square. The Kinky Gerlinky nights were compered by Winston and Stella Stein. Music was supplied by the resident DJs Princess Julia, Tasty Tim, Martin Confusion and Rachel Auburn, whilst entertainment was provided by regular live music and drag performances, as well as a catwalk show.

The regulars of Kinky Gerlinky included Boy George, Leigh Bowery, DJ Jon of the Pleased Wimmin, Transformer, Maur Valance, MC Kinky, and Sheila Tequila.

Kinky Gerlinky's resident photographer, Dick Jewell, produced a DVD/film, titled Kinky Gerlinky, in 2002 that celebrates the infamous club nights. Kinky Gerlinky was highly influential in the next generation of clubs such as Club Skinny, Arcadia, Club Kitten, the Pony Club, Puscha, Stay Beautiful, Kashpoint and Nag Nag Nag.

The film premiered in 2003 as part of the Commonwealth Film Festival in Manchester, England that year. It featured again at the same festival in 2007.

== See also ==
- Taboo Club night
- Vague (club)
