= Tik and Tok =

Mime and music duo

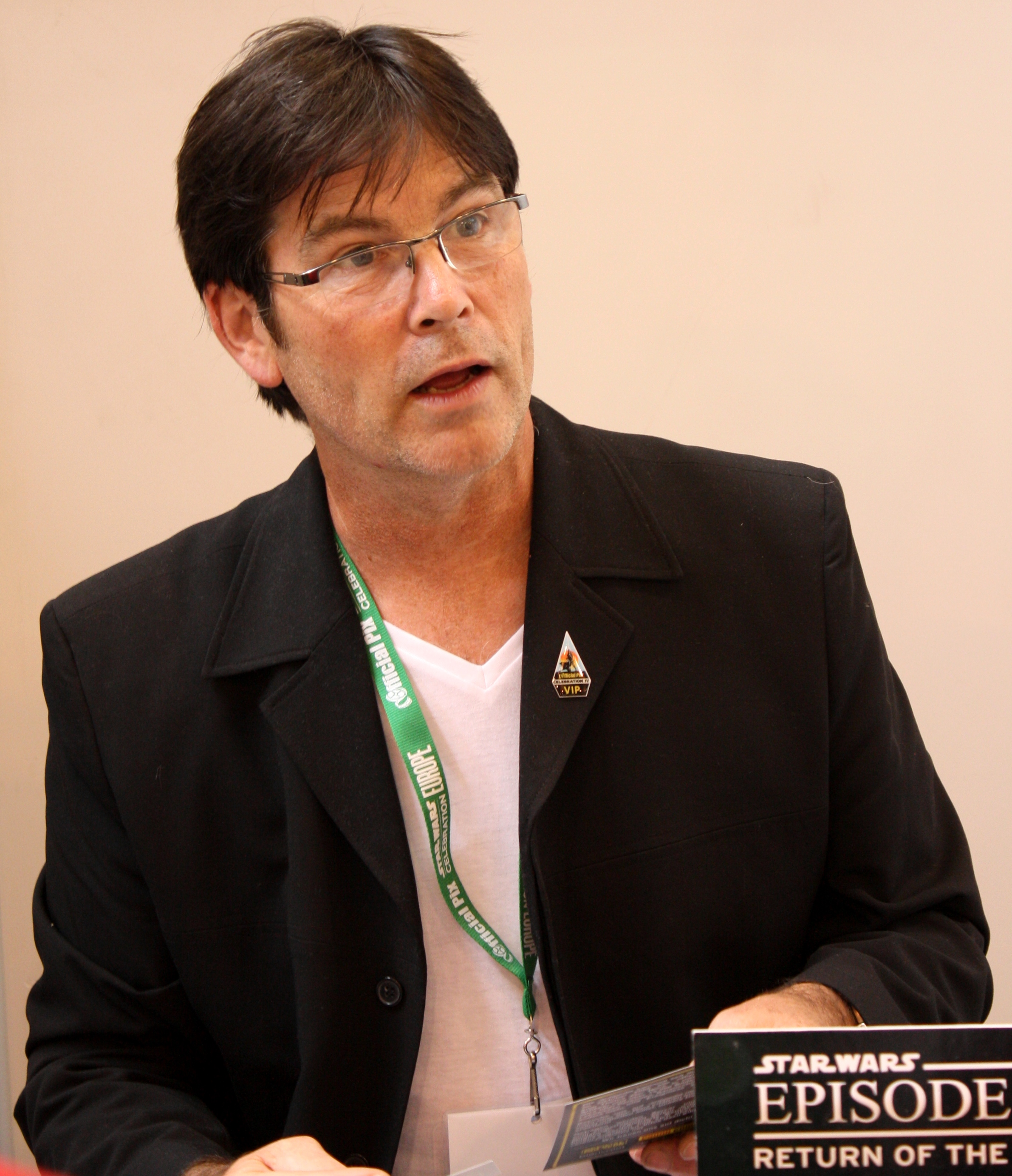
Sean Crawford (2013)

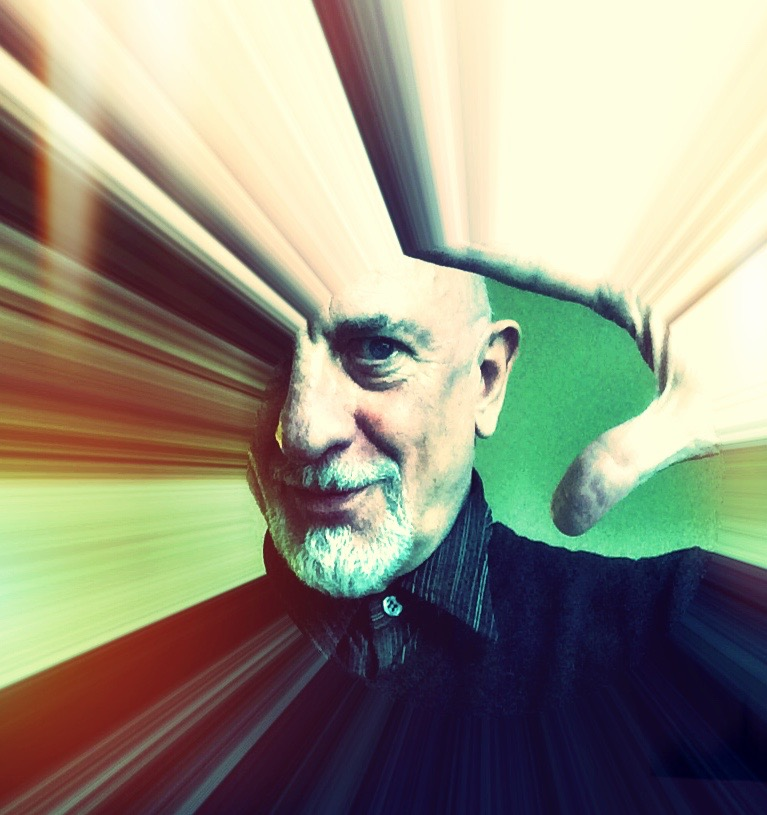
Tim Dry

Tik and Tok are the robotic mime and music duo of Tim Dry and Sean Crawford. They began performing together with Shock, a rock/mime/burlesque/music troupe in the early 1980s with Barbie Wilde, Robert Pereno, L.A. Richards and Carole Caplin.

Shock's first record "Angel Face", with production by Rusty Egan and Richard James Burgess, was a modest dance floor hit. In 1981, Shock co-starred with Ultravox at the 'People's Palace Valentine's Ball' at the Rainbow Theatre.

Shock went on to support Gary Numan at his Wembley Arena shows in April, 1981. They eventually broke up and reformed as a foursome with Wilde, Dry, Crawford and Caplin and released the single, "Dynamo Beat", on RCA Records. However, soon after Dry and Crawford left to form Tik and Tok.

Tik and Tok appeared on television programmes including The Royal Variety Show in 1983 and The Tube. They supported Duran Duran at the Birmingham Odeon in 1982, worked with Vangelis at his home studio, and were themselves supported by a fledgling Depeche Mode. They released five singles and an album on the Survival label in the UK, Germany and Japan. Three of these singles were hits on the UK Indie Chart, "Screen Me I'm Yours" being the most successful, reaching No. 17. Their second single, "Cool Running", peaked at No. 69 in the UK Singles Chart.

They went to Tokyo and Germany for live performances and in 1982, were featured as costumed actors in the film Xtro, followed by Return of the Jedi in 1983. They were also the support act on Gary Numan's 'Warriors' tour in late 1983.

In 2003, Dry and Crawford were invited to be guests at the first of an ongoing series of Star Wars autograph conventions worldwide, as a result of their roles in Return Of The Jedi. This led to them coming back together as Tik and Tok after 20 years, and releasing an album titled Dream Orphans. Tik and Tok then appeared at the 2006 Elektrofest, at Koko in London.

== Discography ==
=== Albums ===
- Intolerance (1984) Survival Records - UK No. 89
- Dream Orphans (2007) Self-released CD
- Intolerance (2018) OTB Records vinyl reissue
- Dream Orphans 2025 (2025) Self-released limited 2CD

=== Singles and EPs ===
- "Summer in the City" / "Crisis" (1982) Survival Records
- "Cool Running" / "Vile Bodies" (1983) Survival Records - UK No. 69
- "Screen Me, I'm Yours" / "Dangerous and Unafraid" (1984) Survival Records - UK No. 79
- "Everything Will Change" / "Cracking Up" (1984) Survival Records
- "Higher Ground" / "Down From The Sky" (1984) Survival Records
- "Tik & Tok EP" (2004) Rephlex label (12" vinyl only)
- "Slightly Deranged EP" (2006) Self-released CD-R
- "Intolerance Xtras EP" (2006) Self-released CD-R
- "Vintage Lo-Fi EP" (2006) Self-released CD-R

=== Compilations ===
- Intolerance: The Very Best of 1982-1984 (2006) Self-released CD-R
- Intolerance 2 Mega (2015) download only.
- Definitive (2019) Self-released limited edition 2xCD compilation of all recorded work from 1982-1984

== Bibliography ==
- Praying To The Aliens by Gary Numan and Steve Malins. Andre Deutsch 1997. ISBN 0-233-99205-7
- Duran Duran - Notorious by Steve Malins. Andre Deutsch 2005. ISBN 0-233-00137-9
- Falling Upwards - Scenes From A Life by Tim Dry. Exposure Publishing. 2005. ISBN 1-84685-013-4
