= Linard (name) =

Linard is a given name and surname. Notable people with the name include:

== Surname ==
- Hubert Linard (born 1953), French racing cyclist
- Jacques Linard (1597–1645), French painter
- Leanne Linard (born 1980), Australian politician
- Stephen Linard (1959–2024), British fashion designer
- Thomas Linard (born 1988), French golfer

== Given name ==
- Linard Gonthier (1565–after 1642) was a glass painter who worked in Troyes, France
