= Vague (club) =

Coordinates: 53.799°N 1.553°W

- Interactive map of Vague
- Address: The Warehouse, 19-21 Somers Street, LS1 2RG
- Location: Leeds, West Yorkshire, England
- Operator: Fryer, Mason and Raphael
- Capacity: 750
- Type: Club night
- Event: Dance Music

Construction
- Opened: 1993–1996

Vague was an influential art club night held at The Warehouse nightclub in Leeds, West Yorkshire, England, from 1993 to 1996.

== History ==
Vague metamorphosed from an earlier proto-club night called the Kit Kat Club at Arcadia operated by Suzy Mason and Paul Fryer (former lead-singer of eighties electropop group Bazooka Joe). Fryer and Mason then brought in Nick Raphael, and debuted Vague at the High Flyers club in Leeds on 10 April 1993, before moving to The Warehouse a month later. Vague blended kitsch with the artistic and theatrical; its outlandish theme and costume parties included a recreation of a day-night out at Blackpool Pleasure Beach only inside the club that was believed to have been filled entirely with beach sand, parasols and miniature fairground rides, a retake on royal garden parties that was held annually and an evening with Vera Duckworth a fictional character from the British soap opera Coronation Street.

The club is credited as being the first in the UK to advertise itself as "mixed"– i.e. for homosexual, heterosexual and polysexual patrons equally. Customers were vetted at the door to prevent hostility towards the queer patrons and preserve the club's position as a safe space.

The British music newspaper Melody Maker featured Vague in 1994 in a review called "For Frock's Sake" and described the club as a "Dance Equivalent of Andy Warhol's The Factory", whilst the Daily Telegraph journalist Tim Willis depicted the scene inside of the club as one of "Bacchanalian excess" for the feature "Up North Where Anything Goes". The pioneering ethos that was behind Vague is what made it so successful years before any other club in the UK adopted a similar safe-space approach, according to Richard Smith speaking in 2006 then editor of Britain's leading gay publication Gay Times on the banning by the UK government of gay straight door policies he stated "one of the most important clubs of the 90s was Trannies With Attitude Vague in Leeds. They – quite consciously – started and worked at building up a big mixed, polysexual club night, and succeeded”. The notoriety of Vague during this period helped to put Leeds firmly on the international club scene radar along with the city's other major house music venue, Back to Basics.

== The Vague sound ==
The club played a mixture of Handbag house, hard house, hard trance and Classic and electronic Disco music played on the main dance floor, with a more eclectic selection of music played on the upper floor such as Glam punk, Musicals.Rare Soul and Jazz Styles. Resident DJs TWA particularly championed "Techno Disco" or "tesko" (for legal reasons) a brand of disco house at the club. A number of Vague anthems included TWA's Disco Biscuit and Nasty Girls, Atlantic Ocean's Waterfall, Björk's Big Time Sensuality, Lisa Lisa Cult Jam's Let the Beat Hit 'Em, WestBam's Wizards of the Sonic, Fierce Ruling Diva's Get Funky, The Lisa Marie Experience's version of Keep on Jumpin' Keep on Jumpin', Gat Decor's Passion, and Alison Limerick's Where Love Lives. TESKO has been defined as Techno with sex put into it; in other words encapsulating the power of Techno then adding in Funk and the love of Classic Disco.

== DJs ==
Original resident DJs included Fryer and Raphael as "TWA" (styled as "Trannies With Attitude" or "The World is Androgynous") and Phil Faversham, later residents included Anne Savage Curtis Zack, Daisy & Havoc. Guest DJ's appearing at the club have included Pete Tong for a live recording of the BBC Radio 1 Essential Mix, Guy Williams, Princess Julia, Paulette and Billy da Kid (a.k.a. Billy Hanshaw)

== Door hosts ==
The host who ran the door at Vague was ‘Madame JoJo’, also known as ‘Lady JoJo Queen of the GoGo’. She was also a member of TWA and featured in the Music Video for their song ‘Nasty Girls’. Another host was Chico, from Glasgow who was studying Northern School of Contemporary Dance.

== Final year ==
In April 1996, a boxed double compilation CD - Vague - Now & Then - was released, its accompanying booklet detailing the history of the club. The night ended after Vague celebrated its third birthday at the Warehouse on 14 September 1996. The organizers then went on to pursue other careers in creative industries, Nick Raphael left to become label manager at FFRR Records and is now president of Capitol Records UK, Paul Fryer moved to London and worked for Fendi as Musical director from 2000 to 2005, he has since carved out a highly successful career as an artist with his work collected by Damien Hirst and Karl Lagerfeld, Suzy Mason partnering Kas Shaw continued in Club Promotion with a similar styled mixed night - called "I-Spy" held at Club NATO in Leeds city centre, the pair then transferred back to the Warehouse on 12 April 1997, soon afterwards it was renamed "Speed Queen," which ran for eleven years before closing in 2008. Speed Queen at the Warehouse was one of three clubs featured in a November 1997 BBC local documentary about Leeds nightlife. Mason subsequently went on to a career in academia and is now a Senior Researcher at the Leeds College of Art. and Phil Faversham went on to work at Ministry of Sound as Club Development Director. Madam JoJo went on to pursue a career in Radio initially with dance music station Kiss 105 then later with Galaxy 105 in Leeds.

== Influence on LGBT discourse ==
The concept of Vague has since been the subject of LGBT discourse and academic research by Dr Kevin Almond at the University of Huddersfield UK through his friendship with Suzy Mason and attendance at Vague, his contributing chapter entitled "Masquerade in Clubland: A Safe Space for Glamour" features in the book Visual Culture and Gender edited by Professor Annette Burfoot at Queen's University Canada. The club and TWA also featured in the book Drag: A History of Female Impersonation in the Performing Arts, A concise history of the drag tradition—from 13th century to today (1995) by Roger Baker, New York University Press.

== Notes ==
The group TWA also included a third member Paul Dillon, one of the founder members of Leeds post-punk group The Cassandra Complex

== See also ==
- Kinky Gerlinky

== Sources ==
- Baker, Roger (1994). Drag : a history of female impersonation in the performing arts. New York, N.Y.: New York University Press. ISBN 9780814712542
- Betts, Graham (2006). Complete UK hit singles 1952–2006. London: Collins. ISBN 9780007200771
- Broughton, Brewster, Frank, Bill. (2007), "Last Night a DJ Saved my Life: The History of the Disc Jockey". Grove Press UK. ISBN 0-7472-6230-6
- Burfoot, Annette, (2014), Visual Culture and Gender: Critical Concepts in Media and Cultural Studies, Routledge, ISBN 0415830044
- Byrnes, Bernie C.; Chatterton, Paul; Hollands, Robert; Read, Cait (2001). The London of the North? Youth cultures, urban change and nightlife in Leeds. Centre for Urban and Regional Development Studies, University of Newcastle.
