= New Romance (disambiguation) =

The New Romantic movement was a British pop-culture movement of the early 1980s, characterised by flamboyant, eccentric fashion.

New Romance may also refer to:

- "New Romance", a song by Beach House from Once Twice Melody, 2022
- "New Romance", a song by Miles Fisher, 2011
- "New Romance", a song by Spider, 1980

== See also ==
- New Romantics (disambiguation)
