= Stephen Linard =

British fashion designer (1959–2024)

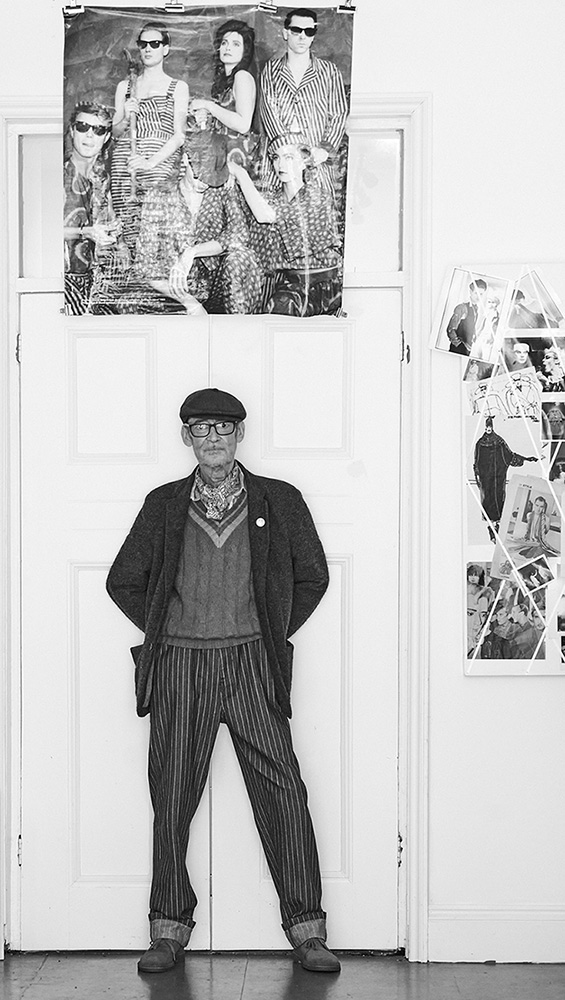
- Linard in 2023
- Born: 26 March 1959; London
- Died: 10 March 2024 (aged 64); St Leonards-on-Sea
- Education: Saint Martin's School of Art
- Occupation: Fashion designer
- Movement: New Romantic; Blitz Kids

Stephen Linard (26 March 1959 – 10 March 2024) was a British fashion designer. He studied at Saint Martin's School of Art and was part of the Blitz Kids and the New Romantic movement.

== Early life and education ==
Linard was born on 26 March 1959. He attended Southend College of Technology and from 1978 to 1981 studied at Saint Martin's School of Art and graduated with a first. He assisted Stephen Jones' final student show in 1979. The following year, Linard presented a fashion collection he designed titled "Neon Gothic" at the Saint Martin's Alternative Show; the models included Boy George and Princess Julia.

Linard's graduate show in 1981 was titled "Reluctant Emigrés"; historians Alan J. Flux and Daryl F. Mallett described the menswear showcased in the show as "instantly covetable, thoroughly masculine in an entirely new way, and electrifying in the way that only the truly innovative can be".

== Career ==
Around this time Linard was part of the Blitz Kids – a group of creatives who regularly attended the Blitz Club in Covent Garden and established the New Romantic movement. Linard created costumes for artists such as David Bowie, Boy George, and the Pet Shop Boys.

Linard made his first womenswear collection in 1982, "Railway Children". He moved to Tokyo in 1983 where were worked as a designer for Jun Co until 1986. The year he set up design company Powderblue; it shut down the following year after the Black Monday stock market crash. In the late 1980s Linard hosted a regular theme night at the Wag Club in Soho, "Total Fashion Victim". He worked as a designer with Notre Dame X, Bigi, and Bazaar. In the 1990s Linard was a designer for Drake's.

In 2000, Linard and Paul Booth established the fashion label Linard. Explaining the decision, Linard said:

I'm so bored with everything in the shops, menswear is so dull and conservative these days. It's all black and grey and beige and taupe. You just can't find exciting clothes for men anymore. There was only one thing to do, and that was to start making my own again.

In the late 2010s he was working as a fashion and design consultant.

== Later life ==
Linard moved to St Leonards-on-Sea in 2020. The town's Rogue Gallery hosted an exhibition in 2023 of Linard's works, including drawings and garments. It was titled "Total Fashion Victim" after the regular event he hosted in Soho in the 1980s. His work also featured in exhibitions at the Fashion and Textile Museum ("Outlaws: Fashion Renegades of 80s London", 2024–25) and the Design Museum ("Blitz: the Club That Shaped the 80s", 2025) . Linard died on 10 March 2024.
