= Kahn & Bell =

Late-1970s British fashion label

- Company type: Private
- Industry: Fashion
- Founded: 1976
- Founders: Jane Kahn and Patti Bell
- Defunct: 1980s
- Headquarters: Hurst Street, Birmingham, England
- Key people: Jane Kahn, Patti Bell
- Products: Clothing and accessories

Kahn & Bell was a fashion label and boutique established by Jane Kahn and Patti Bell in Hurst Street, Birmingham, England in 1976. At the forefront of the emergence of the look of the New Romantic movement they designed clothes for notable bands including Duran Duran and Shock. Simon Le Bon wrote the Duran Duran song Khanada about Jane Kahn.

Kahn and Bell's elaborate and theatrical style brought together a wide range of influences, including Egyptian, African and Far Eastern art, and combined them with elements of futurism and fantasy.

While Kahn & Bell were frequently one step ahead of the capital, they received little attention for this, and "when similarities to London designers were seen in their collections it was considered that Birmingham had copied London," the New Romantic journal New Sounds New Styles observed in 1981. Blueprint reviewed their importance in 1988:

Kahn and Bell had particular impact. Holding court at the Zanzibar, resplendent in leopardskin and padded shoulders, dripping diamonte with leather devils' tails hanging down between their legs, they looked on good nights like Egyptian Queens, like Ancient Babylonians. On not so good nights, they resembled Brassaï's Moma Bijou -"fugitives from Baudelaire's bad dreams", and even then they looked magnificent. For Kahn and Bell and those who followed their lead, identity wasn't something you nailed yourself into in late adolescence. It was a trick of the light, and if you were to avoid burning yourself out (a real risk this, when you sold clothes all day and promoted them all night), then you simply let the flames lick over you and turned the ashes into kohl.

It has been argued over the years by many fashion magazines that Kahn and Bell never reached their true potential as London was always considered the capital of UK fashion. They perhaps missed their "window of opportunity" for global success as they, unlike many designers, never "licensed" their brand, never relocated, as Kahn and Bell, to London and would not compromise their unique "style".

Kahn and Bell eventually went their separate ways in the 1980s. Kahn relocated to London and enjoyed a measure of success alone but was never able to recreate the inspirational "look" that Kahn and Bell had achieved previously.

Bell went on to enjoy continued success with her outlandish, inspired and thought-provoking collections. With clients and customers from all over Europe, SE Asia and Japan, Bell remained a "grass roots" designer, and would appear every weekend at London's Camden Market, whilst remaining a resident of Birmingham. She died in January 2024.
