= Charles Atlas (artist) =

American video artist and film director

Charles Atlas (born 1949) is an American video artist and film director who also does lighting and set design. He is a pioneer in developing media-dance, also called dance for camera. Media dance is work that is created directly for the camera. While Atlas' primary artistic medium is video, he also began to experiment with live electronic performance in 2003. Atlas worked collaboratively with Merce Cunningham from 1975 to 1981. Before his time as the Cunningham company's filmmaker-in-residence (1978–1983), when he made 10 dance films, Atlas was an assistant stage manager for the company, and was already filming Cunningham in little experimental movement studies during breaks from rehearsal. Following his work with Cunningham, he worked independently in film while collaborating with other professionals in the field.

Atlas' work is held in the collection of the Museum of Modern Art in New York. His work is being exhibited at the Institute of Contemporary Art, Boston, Massachusetts until March 16, 2025.

== Works ==
=== Collaboration with Merce Cunningham ===
- 1973: "Changing Steps" Atlas designed jumpsuits in various colors for the dance.
- 1974: "A Video Event" Cunningham and Atlas collaborated on a two-part program for CBS Camera Three, directed by Merrill Brockway.
- 1975: "Blue Studio: Five Segments" solo-video collaboration with Cunningham created in such a small space that they choose to superimpose different backgrounds on the image, making the space seem larger than in actuality.
- 1976: "Event for Television" Cunningham, Atlas and Brockway collaborated on filming National Educational Television's "Dance in America" series.
- 1977 "Fractions" is a videodance showing multiple perspectives simultaneously of the same dance, one of the greatest achievements of dance on camera.
- 1979: "Locale" was one of the first short films of Cunningham's work. Atlas used a Steadicam shot shifting from one group of dancers to another, cross-cutting to jump from rehearsal to performance, close-ups, and distance shots.
- 1981: Channels/Inserts is a video performance of the Merce Cunningham Dance Company directed and edited by Atlas. Choreography and film maker as equal partners. Lighting establishes a somber mood, creating darkness and tunnels of light. Costumes are an intelligent mixture of street and dance-practice attire.

=== Independent work ===
- 1999: "Teach" is a short film made in collaboration with the late British performer Leigh Bowery inspired by paintings of him done by Lucian Freud
- 2003: "Instant Fame!" An interactive show offering anyone the opportunity to create their own short video, which Atlas morphs using graphic magic and video technology.
- 2009: Danspace Project "What Does Dance Have to Say?" was the organizing theme of this year's festival, put together by Lucy Sexton and Charles Atlas.

=== Live performance work ===
- 1994 Delusional, multi-media performance/theater work; collaboration with Marina Abramović; co-produced by Theater am Turm (Frankfurt), Monty Theater (Antwerp), and Consort (Amsterdam)
- 2003 Muscle Shoals, live video and costume design; collaboration with Douglas Dunn (choreographer) and Steve Lacy; performed at Théâtre de la Bastille, Paris and Danspace Project, New York
- 2006: Turning, live video performance in collaboration with Antony and the Johnsons, St. Ann's Warehouse, Brooklyn, New York; Barbican Centre, London

=== Media work ===
- 1981: Channels/Inserts, 16mm film, collaboration with Merce Cunningham. Produced by Cunningham Dance Foundation
- 1983: Secret of the Waterfall, video/dance collaboration with choreographer, Douglas Dunn and poets, Reed Bye and Anne Waldman. Commissioned by New Television Workshop, WGBH-TV, Boston, Massachusetts
- 1986: Hail the New Puritan, a "mockumentary" broadcast featuring Michael Clark. Commissioned by Channel Four Television, London
- 1991: Son of Sam and Delilah, video feature. Produced in association with The Kitchen, New York
- 1992-98: Teach, video portrait/installation, XL Gallery, New York. Collection Hamburger Bahnhof, Berlin, Germany
- 1994: Superhoney, eroto-horror video/dance collaboration with Thomas Hejlsen. Commissioned by The National Film Board of Denmark
- 1997: The Hanged One, four multi-channel video works installed at the Whitney Museum, New York
- 1997-99: The "Martha" Tapes, video collage. First shown at "Mother", New York
- 2000: Merce Cunningham: A Lifetime of Dance, documentary film, commissioned by ARTE France, BBC, WNET-TV. Acquired by the Museum of Modern Art
- 2002: The Legend of Leigh Bowery, documentary film, commissioned by ARTE France. First theatrical showing: Cinema Village, New York
- 2002: Rainer Variations, video montage. First shown as an installation at Rosenwald-Wolf Gallery, University of the Arts, Philadelphia, Pennsylvania
- 2003: Instant Fame, installation and real-time video performance, Participant, Inc., New York

== Grants and awards ==
- 1986: Bessie Award for Costumes for Michael Clark Dance Company
- 1987: Bessie Award for Sustained Achievement in Video
- 1987: Guggenheim Fellowship, John Simon Guggenheim Memorial Foundation
- 1998: Bessie Award for The "Martha" Tapes
- 2000: Dance Screen, Best Documentary for Merce Cunningham: A Lifetime of Dance
- 2003: Melbourne Queer Film Festival, Best Documentary for Legend of Leigh Bowery
- 2006: Foundation for Contemporary Arts John Cage Award

== Collections ==
Atlas' work is held in the following permanent collection:

- Museum of Modern Art, New York: 14 works (as of 15 December 2024)

== General references ==
- Art21, Inc. (2001–2007). Art:21. Charles Atlas. Biography. Documentary Film PBS. Retrieved April 1, 2010..PBS.org.
- Atlas, C. (2006). Charles Atlas: Foundation for Contemporary Arts. Retrieved March 26, 2010. Foundation for Contemporary Arts.
- Vaughan, David (1999) Merce Cunningham: Fifty Years. Aperture. ISBN 0-89381-863-1
