= Faber Music =

British sheet music publisher

- Founded: 1965
- Founder: Benjamin Britten and Donald Mitchell
- Country of origin: United Kingdom
- Headquarters location: London
- Publication types: Sheet music
- Official website: www.fabermusic.com

Faber Music is a British sheet music publisher best known for contemporary classical music. It also publishes music tutor books, and in 2005 acquired popular music publisher International Music Publications.

Faber Music has close relations with the book publisher Faber and Faber. Faber's subsidiary Rights Worldwide Ltd offers copyright administration services to composers and Tv and film production companies.

== History ==
Faber Music Ltd was founded in 1965 as a sister company to Faber and Faber. Its foundation was led by the composer Benjamin Britten who needed a quality publisher to promote and distribute his compositions. The Times newspaper praised the newly founded company as "the new champion of quality in music publishing".

Faber Music was incorporated as a limited company in 1992, changed its name to International Music Publications Limited in 1992 and became Faber Music Ltd in 2011. It is wholly owned by Geoffrey Faber Holdings Ltd.

== Catalogue ==
Faber Music counts among its publications works by noted British composers such as Ralph Vaughan Williams, Malcolm Arnold, Gustav Holst, Benjamin Britten, Colin Matthews and David Matthews, Julian Anderson, Nicholas Maw, Tansy Davies, George Benjamin, Thomas Adès, Oliver Knussen, John Woolrich and Jonathan Harvey.

Among its publications are works by international composers are those of Francisco Coll, Anders Hillborg, Peter Sculthorpe, Carl Vine, Matthew Hindson and Danny Elfman.

Faber also published music scores for stage, film and television, including Andrew Lloyd Webber’s Cats, the concert works of Paul McCartney, Anna Meredith, Howard Goodall (Vicar of Dibley, Mr. Bean), Jonny Greenwood (There Will Be Blood) and Carl Davis (Pride and Prejudice, Cranford, and Hollywood: A Celebration of the American Silent Film).

=== Wind band and brass repertoire ===
Faber Music has published a range of wind band and brass repertoire, including major works such as Nigel Hess’s East Coast Pictures, alongside a broader catalogue of original compositions and arrangements for ensemble.
