= International Music Publications =

British sheet music publisher

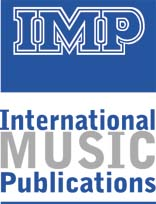
- Parent company: Faber Music
- Country of origin: United Kingdom
- Headquarters location: London
- Publication types: Sheet music

International Music Publications (better known as IMP) is a British publisher of popular sheet music.

== History ==
It began as the European arm of Warner Brothers Publications' sheet music business, and was one of the UK's largest sheet music publishers. Warner was purchased by Alfred Publishing in 2005; IMP was sold on to Faber Music.
