= Lifestyle guru =

Personal development advisor

Lifestyle gurus, also known as lifestyle coaches, trainers, or consultants, work with individuals to help them make lifestyle changes aimed at improving their overall well-being and happiness. These professionals guide people in areas such as health, fitness, relationships, and personal growth, tailoring advice to individual needs.

The profession gained widespread attention in the 1990s and 2000s, popularized by public figures and celebrities like Cherie Blair and Madonna. Lifestyle gurus often gained prominence by working with high-profile clients and offering personalized coaching.

One notable example is Carole Caplin, who served as a lifestyle coach for the Blair family, helping them with fitness, nutrition, and well-being strategies.

== Activities ==
Lifestyle gurus may be considered to embody para-social interaction; leveraging perceived intimacy, authenticity, and integrity to gain attention and fame. They are enabled by social media to attain micro-celebrity status and influence, demonstrating the attachment and trust they garner from the public.

Influencers, especially in health and wellness, effectively engage their audience through "influencer pedagogy". This method, while indirect, educates followers on social media platforms through relatable interactions, cultivating authenticity and expertise (Hendry et al., 2021).

== Criticism ==
Lifestyle gurus have come under heavy criticism in recent years, with most criticisms concerning their utility. Other criticisms have centred on the perception that they are a symptom of the indecisiveness of today's society.

Frank Furedi, a professor of sociology at the University of Kent, has been a prominent critic of lifestyle gurus. Lifestyle gurus have received criticism for preaching unscientific ideas and thus influencing public opinion.

A 2017 article in Vox accused personal-growth gurus of being "all smoke and mirrors", "a hypocrite's game", and "bullshit artistry" aimed at making money from selling a product, such as books or conferences.

== See also ==
- Life coaching
- Motivational speaker
- Peer support specialist
- Self-help
