= Carole Caplin =

Health and wellness writer

- Born: 8 January 1962 (age 64)
- Occupations: Health and wellbeing consultant

Carole Caplin (born 8 January 1962) is a British former health consultant, who was the style adviser to Cherie Blair and a fitness adviser to Tony Blair, when he was the British prime minister. She sparked media interest because of her relationship with the convicted conman Peter Foster.

== Early life ==
Caplin and her elder sister were brought up by her mother, Sylvia, of Jewish descent, who was a ballet dancer with the Festival Ballet until a car crash ended her dancing career. Her mother divorced her father, a furrier, when Caplin was a toddler. Caplin was educated at Glendower Preparatory School, a private school in South Kensington, Lillesden School for Girls, a boarding school in Kent, and Hurlingham and Chelsea Secondary School.

She appeared as a child actor in the film Accident (1967), and in television advertisements. In 1980 she became a member of the burlesque pop band Shock.

She had a relationship with Adam Ant in 1981. The two met up again in 1983, on which occasion Ant reports that Caplin tried to recruit him to Exegesis. The pair had further contact around 1995.

== Career ==
According to The Observer, during the 1980s Caplin worked for the telemarketing company Programmes Ltd, and became involved in the related Exegesis alternative therapy programme. Later Caplin set up a series of health and well-being companies.

Caplin has written a number of health and well-being books, and appeared in several television programmes, including presenting her own Channel 4 programme The Carole Caplin Treatment.

== Cheriegate ==
In 2002, Caplin hit the newspaper headlines in the scandal referred to as "Cheriegate" because of her involvement with Peter Foster, an Australian with criminal convictions, who assisted the Prime Minister's wife, Cherie Blair, in the purchase of two flats in Bristol. Cherie Blair tried to distance herself from Foster and briefed the press office at 10 Downing Street to make a public statement claiming that Foster was not involved with the deal. She was caught out when Foster provided evidence that she had lied. She then made a public apology, tearfully reading a prepared statement blaming her "misfortune" on the pressures of running a family and being a mother. She again tried to distance herself from Foster, but it was later revealed that she and Tony Blair had agreed to be godparents to the yet-to-be born child of Caplin (Caplin later miscarried).

== Daily Mail libel case ==
In 2010 Caplin started libel proceedings against the Daily Mail for a newspaper article that suggested that Caplin might have been considering selling the story of her time with the Blairs and to "blow the lid on Tony and Cherie Blair’s sex secrets". It was announced on 1 November 2011 that Caplin has accepted "substantial" damages from the newspaper for the false claims the Mail had made.

== News of the World phone-hacking target ==
On 1 November 2011 Caplin announced that the Metropolitan Police had told her that her mobile phone had probably been hacked on the instructions of the News of the World. Caplin's spokesman stated that, "Dating from 2002, Ms Caplin's is one of the earliest cases so far discovered and the police investigation has yet to uncover all the available evidence. Once she is able to establish the extent of this invasion of her privacy, Ms Caplin will decide what further action to take."

Alastair Campbell, Tony Blair's former communications director, told the Leveson inquiry that it was "at least possible" that press stories about Cherie Blair had been obtained by hacking Caplin's phone, and he had apologised to Caplin that he had earlier accused her of tipping off newspapers.
