= Hail the New Puritan =

- Directed by: Charles Atlas
- Produced by: Jolyon Wimhurst
- Starring: Michael Clark, Leigh Bowery, Mark E. Smith, Brix Smith, Anthony Doughty
- Cinematography: John Simmons
- Edited by: Charles Atlas
- Music by: The Fall, Glenn Branca, Bruce Gilbert, Jeffrey Hinton
- Distributed by: Electronic Arts Intermix
- Release date: 21 May 1986
- Running time: 85 minutes
- Country: England
- Language: English

Hail the New Puritan is a 1986 British fictionalized documentary about the Scottish dancer and choreographer Michael Clark. It was directed by Charles Atlas. Production design is by Leigh Bowery, who also appears. Much of the music is by The Fall, and Mark E. Smith and Brix Smith appear in a mock interview with Clark. Additional music is provided by Glenn Branca, Bruce Gilbert (of Wire), and Jeffrey Hinton.

Using a faux-cinéma vérité style, Atlas depicts a day in Clark's life as he and his company prepare for a performance of New Puritans (1984). The company at that time included Gaby Agis, Leslie Bryant, Matthew Hawkins, Julie Hood, and Ellen van Schuylenburch.

The film was broadcast on 21 May 1986 on Channel 4's "Dance on 4" program (on Channel 4). It is distributed on DVD and VHS by Electronic Arts Intermix.

== Plot ==
The film opens with a strange dance number that continually gets interrupted by Leigh Bowery and his friends (Sue Tilley and Nicola Bateman, later Nicola Bowery), who keep walking over to a table of fruit. Michael Clark wakes up and begins rehearsing. Other members of the company gradually arrive. A reporter calls, then drops by to interview Clark; they discuss how he started dancing and came to London, as well as his interest in traditional Scottish dance. Clark appears on a TV program with Mark E. Smith and Brix Smith. Gaby Agis walks by the river, musing about how she should find her own apartment (she's been staying with Clark). The company performs scenes from New Puritans. Julie Hood's boyfriend, meanwhile, is shown wandering London. Clark and Agis shoot a scene in a film. Clark visits Bowery, who along with his friends Trojan and Rachel, are "getting ready" (dressing up) for the clubs. Clark leaves for a rendezvous with "a date," then heads out to a clubs himself, where he dances. Finally, at pre-dawn, he heads home, where Agis is already in bed. Clark strips and dances to Elvis's "Are You Lonesome Tonight?"
