= A. M. Hanson =

British artist

Alexander Mark "A M" Hanson (born 1969) is an English artist and photographer. He is based in London.

== Early life ==
Born in 1969, adopted and raised in the Yorkshire countryside, near Leeds, in north-east England. His mother, A.A. Hanson (Leeds College of Art), is a potter and former art teacher.

He sang in a church choir (St. Edmund's, Roundhay, c.1980). After schools in Leeds and York, he moved from home at age 17, holding happenings in the basement of a shared house in the Harehills area of Leeds. Around the same time he attended courses with the National Youth Theatre and performed in productions at Leeds University Workshop Theatre. His first exhibited work (photo montages) was shown at Leeds City Art Gallery in a group display about new surrealism. He left the formal education system early (after a brief period at a local arts college) and moved to London in 1989. Later that year he travels to Berlin and witnesses and documents the historic collapse of the Berlin Wall.

== 1990s work ==
His first published imagery features in i-D magazine (1991) of nightclubbers at a rave. Social and performance based photos appear in various music, scene and listings publications throughout the early to mid '90s, sometimes using the moniker 'Alex Sparks', forming handmade picture books and print folios. Appears in a French TV commercial (1993), playing a catwalk photographer, for a Mod's Hair product. Making film stills he also appears in the award-winning short A Smashing Night Out (BBC 10 x 10 series 1994). His photo series includes an early picture of designer Alexander McQueen on the verge of fame, alongside other progressive characters, at a time when London was witnessing the so-called Brit Art Brit Pop cultural explosion. Prints from this period later featured in QueerNation, a large 20th-century group retrospective of polysexual London nightlife (Elms Lesters Painting Rooms, London 2002).

Hanson was the only photographer to record performer and cultural icon Leigh Bowery's legendary last show at the Freedom Cafe London in late 1994. Some of the work was later exhibited (including at The Fine Art Society, London 1995) and published, firstly in the 1998 monograph Leigh Bowery prompting publisher Robert Violette to say that the photographs; "represent a crucial, defining moment of London in the 1990s". An audio/visual book, featuring collaborations between artists and musicians, We Love You shows photo story and in-situ portraiture work, alongside that of more established art world figures such as Gilbert & George, Tracey Emin and Marc Quinn.

He sometimes performs with The Offset and The Paper People collectives, talking or singing to a "side kick" Susan Tripod, first in shows in his kitchen and first publicly at LUX Centre London, 1998.

Drawings based on aerial photos of islands and coral reefs, with related travel and environmental ephemera, are first displayed at Vexed Generation in Soho (London, April 1999).

== 2000s ==
Forms Alexcalledsimon Projects to produce and present collaborative and solo work based around a concept "photo-family" and storylines. These performances, displays and recordings form part of live events, exhibitions, web based videos, screenings and feature in publications. He appears in "Battle of the Boutiques" London Fashion Week (A/W 2004) wearing Missy island map drawings evoked as paper hats. Paper cut outs from this project form a message trail across the Greek Cyclades islands the same year.

Exhibits at home and abroad, including Japan at Rice+ Tokyo 2003, various London galleries and project spaces including; The Centre of Attention 2003, The Photographer's Gallery / group display 2007, Residence Gallery 2008, Wolfgang Tillmans London studio space 2008, Donlon Books 2009/10, at UK art festivals Hackney Wicked 2008, exhibits across Europe 24London – Milan, Berlin, Barcelona 2006, and in a series of department store windows for t.a.g galleries, Brussels 2009.

Performance associated photo work continues, including studies (often forming extended series) of performers such as David Hoyle and others at the cutting edge of the avant garde and offshoots of pop culture. Some of this imagery forms photo blogs, other material is published including featuring in Dance Theatre Journal (vol. 23 No. 1, 2008 UK, 'Hoyle's Humility' cover and lead story images) and Gazelland magazine USA (with group display at Leo Kesting Gallery, New York) 2008 and 2009.

== 2010s ==
Formulates new ideas and work with studio based studies first at LCC University of the Arts London UAL, then at the University for the Creative Arts at Canterbury, BA (Hons) Fine Art graduating in 2013 with first class honours. New work first shown at various academic spaces and then at Galleria Uno+Uno in Milan (2012).

Contributions to other group shows include touring show Business As Usual at various venues including for North Contemporary 2015, and the summer salon at Lubomirov / Angus-Hughes Gallery, London 2016. Hanson curates a group test site event at Satellite Festival, Whitstable Biennale 2012, and several interdisciplinary shows whilst at UCA.

In A Distant, Darkened Lobby a solo show at Limbo Arts, Margate 2014 (part of the town and Turner Contemporary's Summer of Colour season), interconnected installations or 'photo sets' comprise oversized layered prints and backlit film, ready made and adapted objects and office furniture with applied transfers, and films. The show reimagines office spaces as fragments of artist's studios, a theme and motif that becomes central to his practice. Some of this work, in a new arrangement, then transfers to show at Regent's Place Plaza, London 2014, during Frieze Art Fair Week.

Archive photographs are published in Alexander McQueen: Fashion Visionary and The Life and The Legacy with quotes from the photographer, and alongside another interview text in a biography of the late designer Blood Beneath The Skin, in the German book Leigh Bowery Verwandlungskünstler. Photographs of McQueen are acquired by Central Saint Martins Museum and Study Collection.

Collaborative short films and a live video are made with Dale Cornish for the musician's 2014 Xeric recordings (Entr'acte Records).

Hanson curates a studios project which first shows as Studio Life Lines in a Docklands atrium as part of Photo Month Festival 2016, with emerging and established artists, film makers and photographers. A print based show and shop These Studio Cities looks at a variety of makers' print processes, during open studios in Woolwich 2017. This evolving project aims to highlight the energy, ideas and productivity of studio situations and systems and their vital role for individuals, groups and creative communities especially in cities.

== 2020s ==
Hanson's series of photo stories on life in London during the COVID-19 pandemic and its aftermath were published in Fitzrovia News from 2020 to 2022.

His city-as-studio thematic photo project evolves across lens based stories and mixed media formats and also into stylised scenarios of the city reimagined in the post covid world, including image files, prints, works on paper, videos and installations. This includes an ongoing photo series exploring still life in city windows.

Archive photographs were featured in the 2025 exhibition on Leigh Bowery at the Tate Modern.

Hanson makes a photo series documenting the UK AIDS Memorial Quilt display in the Turbine Hall at Tate Modern during June 2025, with selected work first published in The Guardian alongside an article by writer Charlie Porter and across media.
