= Exegesis (group) =

Group of individuals that delivered the Exegesis Programme

- Formation: 1976
- Founder: Robert D'Aubigny
- Type: Human potential / self religion group
- Location: United Kingdom

Exegesis was a group of individuals that delivered the Exegesis Programme through an Exegesis Seminar. The alleged end result of the programme was individual enlightenment, a personal transformation. Founded in 1976 as Infinity Training by Robert D'Aubigny, a former actor, Exegesis ran seminars in the United Kingdom in the later 1970s and early 1980s. Although not in itself a religion or belief, the programme was popularly interpreted as such. The Cult Information Centre categorised it as a "therapy cult", focused on personal and individual development, and George Chryssides categorised it as a self religion.

In the 1970s Robert D’Aubigny remodelled Werner Erhard's controversial EST program into the more UK friendly Exegesis programme while keeping the essence of it unaltered. Graduates of the programme could attend workshops where a participant worked on personal development while being supported in confronting worst fears. At one time Exegesis claimed to have about 5,000 people in the programme.

Robert D'Aubigny was influenced by 'eastern mysticism', being very prevalent in the UK in the 1970s. The stated aims of the organisation were the 'transformation of society' as he viewed present society as 'misled'. Exegesis planned a 'university city' at 'Avalon' the fictional home of King Arthur where the headquarters for this 'transformation of society' would be engineered. Exegesis was quite happy to refer to themselves as a cult and one of Mr D'Aubigny's stated aims was to become an MP within '5 years'. His movement was almost entirely discredited as being the work of a ' paranoid megalomaniac'. He has maintained some cult following among pseudo 'new-age' groups and quack psychologists.

Greater interest in the programme led to the group being investigated by the press and becoming the subject of a controversial television play. In 1984 British Members of Parliament raised questions in the House of Commons, to which the Minister of State for Home Affairs David Mellor responded "some organisations and views are deeply repugnant to most sensible people and profoundly wrong-headed and damaging to those drawn into the web of their activities. Nevertheless, unless and until those involved actually break the law, it is difficult for the Government to set their hand against them." The Home Office asked the Metropolitan and Avon and Somerset police to investigate Exegesis following the suicide of Ashley Doubtfire after he attended a 'seminar'. Although the police brought no charges, Exegesis ceased to run seminars around 1984, but re-emerged as a telesales company called Programmes Ltd, which had a turnover of nearly £6.5 million in 1990.

== See also ==
- Human Potential Movement
- The Exegesis Seminar / The Exegesis Programme
- The Exegesis Seminar - a re-enactment of the seminar
- The Exegesis Programme - a literal validation of the programme
