= Michael Clark (dancer) =

Scottish dancer and choreographer

Michael Duncan Clark CBE (born 29 May 1962) is a Scottish dancer and choreographer.

== Early life ==
Clark was born in Aberdeen and began traditional Scottish dancing at the age of four. In 1975 he left home to study at the Royal Ballet School in London, and on his final day at the school he was presented with the Ursula Moreton Choreographic Award. In 1979 Clark joined Ballet Rambert, working primarily with Richard Alston, who created roles for him in Bell High (1979), Landscape (1980), Rainbow Ripples (1981) and, subsequently, two solos: Soda Lake (1981) and Dutiful Ducks (1982). Later, attending a summer school with Merce Cunningham and John Cage led him to work with Karole Armitage, through whom he met Charles Atlas.

Michael Clark has collaborated with fashion designers Alexander McQueen for his S/S04 Deliverance collection, BodyMap, artists Sarah Lucas and Peter Doig, performance artist Leigh Bowery, and musicians Wire, Laibach, The Fall, Jarvis Cocker and Scritti Politti.

== Career ==
Clark's commissions for major dance companies include the G.R.C.O.P. (Groupe de Recherche Chorégraphique de l'Opéra de Paris), The Paris Opera, Scottish Ballet, London Festival Ballet, Ballet Rambert, Phoenix Dance Company and the Deutsche Oper Berlin. Clark has also produced considerable work for film and video, including Hail the New Puritan (1984) and Because We Must (1989) with Charles Atlas. He also choreographed and danced the role of Caliban in Peter Greenaway's Prospero’s Books (1991).

In 1998 he presented a new full-length work, current/SEE, in collaboration with Susan Stenger, Simon Pearson, Big Bottom, and Hussein Chalayan which became the subject of a BBC documentary directed by Sophie Fiennes, The Late Michael Clark. Before and After: The Fall (2001) was Clark's first major collaboration with the visual artist Sarah Lucas, followed by an evening entitled Would, Should, Can, Did (2003), for the Barbican, London. In the same year Clark created the first Satie Stud for William Trevitt of George Piper Dances, choreographed a solo for Mikhail Baryshnikov, and OH MY GODDESS opened London Dance Umbrella's 25th anniversary season. In 2004 Rambert Dance Company revived SWAMP (1986), which received the Olivier Award for Best New Dance Production in 2005.

In 2005 Clark embarked on the Stravinsky Project, a three-year project to produce a trilogy of works to seminal dance scores by Igor Stravinsky. He radically reworked Mmm... (1992) and 0 (1994), for this project, and in 2007 he premiered the final part of the trilogy, I Do. In 2009 he debuted come, been and gone at the Venice Biennale. Subsequent productions include New Work (2012) (later "animal / vegetable / mineral") and his most recent work "to a simple, rock 'n' roll . . . song." which premiered at the Barbican in London in October 2016. He has created major site-specific commissions for the Tate Modern, Whitney Biennial, the 2012 Cultural Olympiad at Glasgow's Barrowland Ballroom, and The Institute of Contemporary Art (Miami).

Clark was appointed Commander of the Order of the British Empire (CBE) in the 2014 Birthday Honours for services to dance.

== Productions ==
Year	Title
1979	Overground Trio C Belongings
1980	Surface Values
1981	Untitled Duet
1982	Of a feather, FLOCK A Wish Sandwich Rush
1983	Parts I – IV 1st Orange Segment The Artless Dodge (I'm in an evil mood tonight, don't you want want me baby? and Sexist Crabs) 12 X U Mission Accomplished: Tutu Invisible
1984	Flippin' eck oh thweet myth-tery of life Morag's Wedding 12 extemporay, thank yoU New Puritans (duet) Parts I – IV (duet) Do you me? I Did New Puritans Le French Revolting
1985	HAIL the classical Angel Food not H.AIR our caca phoney H.our caca phony H.
1986	Art for Money Drop Your Pearls and Hog It, Girl Swamp No Fire Escape in Hell
1987	Pure Pre-Scenes Because We Must
1988	I Am Curious, Orange
1989	Wrong Rights Heterospective
1990	Solo Because We Must world tour
1991	Modern Masterpieces
1992	Rite Now Mmm... Bog 3.0
1994	O
1998	Yet ~ current/SEE
2001	fig – 1 Before and After: The Fall
2003	Satie Stud Would, Should, Can, Did Rattle Your Jewellery OH MY GODDESS Look at that picture...
2004	nevertheless, caviar Swamp
2005	A Physical Dialogue Stravinsky Project Part 1: O
2006	Stravinsky Project Part 2: Mmm... Merce's Nurse
2007	Stravinsky Project Part 3: I Do
2009	come, been and gone
2010	Tate Project: Part I
2011	th
2012	WHO'S ZOO? The Barrowlands Project New Work 2012
2013	animal / vegetable / mineral
2016	to a simple, rock 'n' roll . . . song.

== Filmography ==
Year	Title	Director	Role/Credit
1986	Hail the New Puritan	Charles Atlas	Himself/Choreographer
1989	Because We Must	Charles Atlas	Himself/Choreographer
1991	Prospero's Books	Peter Greenaway	Caliban/Choreographer
2001	The Late Michael Clark	Sophie Fiennes	Himself/Choreographer

== Awards ==
Year	Association	Category	Work	Result
2005	Olivier Awards	Best New Dance Production	SWAMP	Won
2011	Robert Gordon University	Honorary Degree of Doctor of Arts (Hon DArt)	n/a	n/a
2013	Manchester Theatre Awards	Robert Robson Award for Dance	New Work (2012)	Won
2013	Ludwig Forum for International Art	Peter and Irene Ludwig Foundation Award for Innovation in the Arts	n/a	Won
