= Steve Fairnie =

British artist and performer (died 1993)

Steve Fairnie, pictured in 1982

Stephen Angus Fairnie (21 February 1951 - 22 February 1993) was a British musician, artist and actor, the frontman of the post-punk band Writz, and as one half, with Bev Sage, of the 1980s outfit Techno Twins (later just The Technos).

== Career ==
Writz became a fixture on the post-punk London scene, headlining at major venues including the Marquee Club.

Writz / Famous Names
- Writz, 1980 publicity shot

Background information
- Origin: Bristol / London (UK)
- Genres: New wave, post-punk, art rock
- Years active: 1978–1981
- Label: Electric Records
- Past members: Steve Rowles (vocals & guitar); Steve Fairnie (vocals); Bev Sage (vocals); Jules Hardwick (guitar); Nick Battle (bass); Arry Axell (drums)
- Website: fairnie.net

Fairnie and Sage continued as the Techno Twins, covering "Falling in Love Again", which charted in 1982, and releasing Swing Together, a Glenn Miller-meets-Marilyn Monroe pastiche. The album Technostalgia followed, and in 1985, as The Technos, Foreign Land—produced, amongst others, by Anne Dudley of Art of Noise—was issued to critical acclaim but minimal sales. In August 1985, the Technos performed their last-ever live show at the Greenbelt festival, an annual Christian event with which they had been heavily involved from its inception more than a decade earlier.

As a fine artist, Fairnie's most prominent pieces were created in the second half of the 1980s to his death in 1993. He also received many commissions to illustrate magazines and books, including for US poet Robert Lax's 24th and 7th.

== Personal life ==
Fairnie was born in Fraserburgh in 1951.

In 1977 he married Bev Sage. They had one son and one daughter.

In 1993, Fairnie died from an asthma attack while on a field trip to Brixham, Devon, with a group of students from Weston-super-Mare College, where he was a lecturer. Despite his limited commercial success ("The thing I hate most about myself is my complete inability to make money."), his contributions to both post-punk and New Romantic music are fondly remembered.
