= Bev Sage =

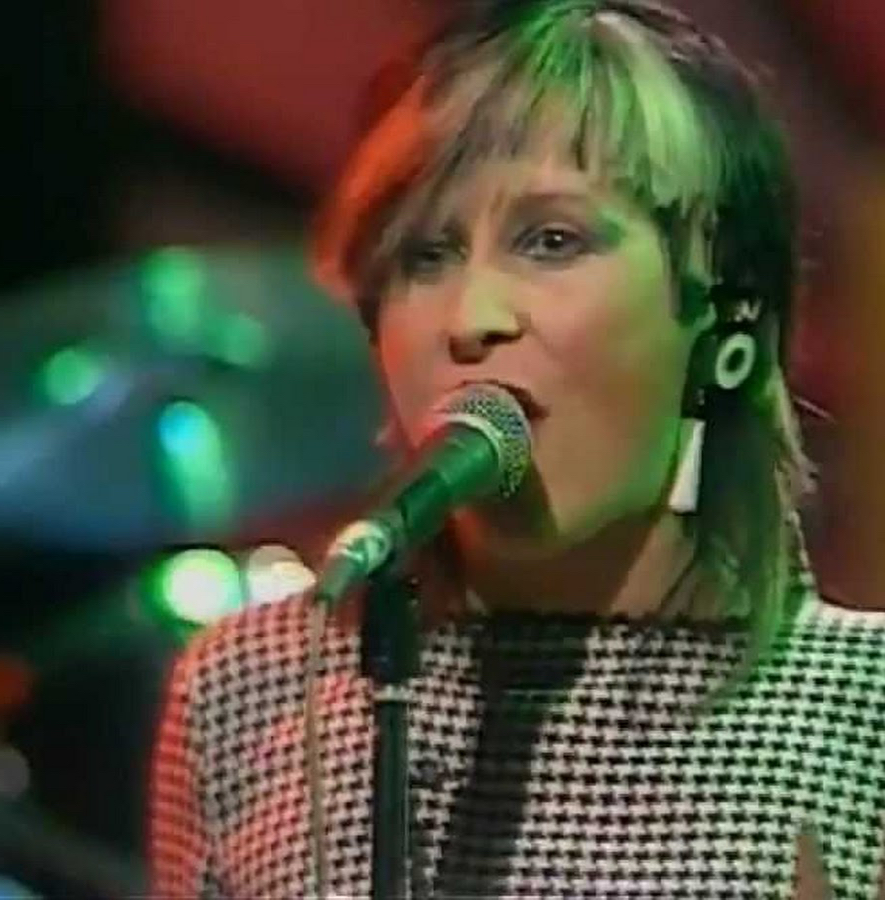
- Sage in 1980

Background information
- Origin: London (UK)
- Genres: Electronic, synth-pop, new wave
- Labels: WEA, PRT Records, Electric Records, Warner Brothers Publishing
- Formerly of: Techno Twins

Bev Sage is a British artist and singer/songwriter. Sage and Steve Fairnie were the 1980s electronic pop-duo the Techno Twins (also known as The Technos). Sage had UK chart success with "Falling in Love Again" and was a featured artist on the Modern Romance song "Queen of the Rapping Scene (Nothing Ever Goes the Way You Plan)", which reached #37 in the UK Singles Chart and which she performed on Top of the Pops. Sage's vocals were also recorded for Monty Python's film The Meaning of Life, and she has been featured in numerous other music of other music and arts projects.

Sage's work as an art director has led her to styling live shows such as The Blues Brothers and directing fashion shows at numerous venues, including the Saatchi Gallery London and the "Recycled Fashion Show" for Cancer Research UK, London. Sage has worked in television, presenting, directing and producing arts shows for the BBC and ITV.
