= Techno Twins =

British electronic music duo

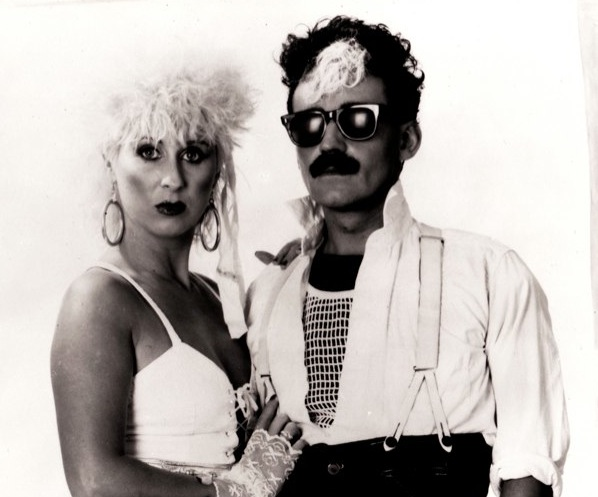
- Techno Twins

Background information
- Origin: London, England
- Genres: Techno; electronic; synth-pop
- Years active: 1977–1988
- Label: PRT
- Past members: Steve Fairnie; Bev Sage
- Website: fairnie.net

The Techno Twins (later known simply as the Technos) were a British electronic music duo formed in London.

== Career ==
The band, consisting of husband-wife duo Steve Fairnie and Bev Sage, formed in 1977. In the 1990s, Mixmag magazine credited the Techno Twins with coining the phrase 'techno' and starting the techno music revolution.

Separating from the band Writz, the duo decided that they would combine old songs with modern electronic sounds, and in December 1982 they were signed by PRT Records. Their debut single was a cover of "Falling in Love Again", and the song received airplay and critical acclaim from the press. It peaked at No. 70 on the UK Singles Chart, their only appearance in any UK chart. An album, Technostalgia followed, made up of songs from the 1930s and 1940s, and some self-composed songs with Dave Hewson. Later in the year, their version of Elvis Presley's "Can't Help Falling in Love" was released.

In 1983, following the name change to the Technos, the single "Foreign Land" produced by Joe Glasman was released, and reached the top 10 of the US Hot Dance Club Play chart. Later that year, the Technos began work with producer Anne Dudley, and recorded an album at AIR Studios.

In early 1984, the single "Nighttime Heaven" was released, along with a board game invented by Steve Fairnie called "Hype", a rock and roll career game. In August 1984, their last single, "Spirit of the Thing", was released.

Sage was guest vocalist on the Modern Romance song "Queen of the Rapping Scene (Nothing Goes the Way You Plan)", which reached No. 37 in 1982 on the UK Singles Chart. It was performed on Top of the Pops that year.

== Discography ==
=== Albums ===
- 1982: Techno Twins – Technostalgia:
  - "Swing Together (I Wanna Be Loved by You/In the Mood)"
  - "Beautiful Women in Bermuda Shorts"
  - "Gone with the Wind"
  - "Hi-Tech"
  - "Donald & Julie Go Boating"
  - "I Got You Babe"
  - "Falling in Love Again"
  - "Romantic Nights"
  - "Kings & Queens of Pleasure"
  - "Can't Help Falling in Love"
  - "Angels of Mercy"
- 1982: Techno Orchestra – Casualtease
  - "Let There Be Neon"
  - "Mechanical Ballet"
  - "Berlin Ballerina"
  - "Observation"
  - "Techno Refugee"
  - "Lunatic Republic"
  - "When Is Pleasure Pain?"
  - "Boy"
  - "Lily Marlene"
  - "Military Business (Muscle Culture II)"
- 1983: Various Artists – Curious Collection (compilation album)
  - Pietro Dinzee – "When You Get What You Wanted"
  - Famous Names – "You're the Cream in My Coffee"
  - Steve Rowles – "Venetian Blind"
  - Steve Fairnie – "Button Up"
  - Bev Sage – "Blind Girl"
  - Nick Battle – "Big Boy"
  - Early Warning – "Escape from Emotion"
  - Click – "Touch Too Much"
  - P.S. Personal – "Compassion"
  - Writz – "Downtown"
  - Techno Orchestra – "Dance On"
  - Crocodile Tears – "Angel Station"
- 1985: The Technos – Foreign Land
  - "Falling in Love Again"
  - "Spirit of the Thing"
  - "Prisoner of Love"
  - "Crying in the Rain"
  - "Visions of the Night"
  - "Foreign Land"
  - "Nighttime Heaven"
  - "Lunatic Republic"
  - "Clowns on the Ground"
  - "Slowboats to China"
- 1988: The Technos – Songs for a Nervous World
  - "Friends & Frontiers"
  - "Dare to Dance"
  - "Share Food Like the Bees"
  - "Beat the Wings"
  - "Mechanical Ballet"
  - "Half a Story"
  - "War: One Voice"
  - "Pioneer's Song"
  - "Walk into the Light"
  - "What You Believe"

=== Singles ===
- 1981: Techno Twins – "Falling in Love Again" b/w "Donald & Julie Go Boating" - UK #70
- 1981: Techno Twins – "Can't Help Falling in Love" b/w "Kings & Queens of Pleasure"
- 1982: Techno Twins – "Swing Together" b/w "Beautiful Women in Bermuda Shorts"
- 1983: The Technos – "Foreign Land" - U.S. Dance #10
- 1984: The Technos – "Hype" b/w "Nighttime Heaven"
- 1984: The Technos – "Spirit of the Thing" b/w "Visions of the Night"
- 1985: The Technos – "Falling in Love Again" b/w "Prisoner of Love"
- 1985: The Technos – "Foreign Land"
