= Leigh Bowery =

Australian artist and fashion designer (1961–1994)

- Leigh Bowery
- Born: 26 March 1961; Melbourne, Victoria, Australia
- Died: 31 December 1994 (aged 33); Westminster, London, England
- Occupations: Performance artist; fashion designer; club promoter; actor; model
- Years active: 1980–1994
- Spouse: Nicola Bateman (m. 1994)

Leigh Bowery (26 March 1961 – 31 December 1994) was an Australian performance artist, club promoter, and fashion designer. Bowery's performances featured striking costumes and make-up and were conceptual, flamboyant, outlandish, and sometimes controversial.

Based in London for much of his adult life, he was a model and muse for the English painter Lucian Freud. Bowery's friend and fellow performer Boy George said he saw Bowery's performances a number of times, and that they "never ceased to impress or revolt."

Bowery also appeared in the video for the song "Cruiser's Creek" by the English band The Fall.

== Early life and years in London ==
Bowery was born and raised in Sunshine, a suburb of Melbourne, Australia. From an early age, he studied music, played piano, and went on to study fashion and design at RMIT for a year. He moved to London in 1980, saying, "I was so itchy to see new things and to see the world, that I just left."

Bowery became part of the London club scene. He became a figure in the underground clubs of London and New York, as well as in art and fashion circles. He attracted attention by wearing outlandish and creative outfits, which he made himself. He became friends and flatmates with artist Gary Barnes (known as "Trojan") and David Walls. Bowery created costumes for them to wear, and the trio became known in the clubs as the "Three Kings". Bowery appeared in magazines and on television, including commercials for Pepe Jeans and Rifat Ozbek.

In 2005, the National Portrait Gallery of Australia acquired a portrait of Bowery in his fur coat by the photographer David Gwinnutt. In 2007, the National Portrait Gallery in London purchased Gwinnutt's portrait of Bowery and Trojan (Barnes), which also appears in the Violette Editions book.

== Taboo club ==
Bowery was a club promoter, and created the club Taboo at Maximus in Leicester Square with promoter Tony Gordon in 1985. Taboo became "the place to be" with long queues. Drugs, particularly ecstasy, became a part of the dancing scene for the attendees. The club defied sexual convention, embraced "polysexualism", and played unexpected song selections. The DJs were Jeffrey Hinton, Rachel Auburn and Mark Lawrence. Regular guests included Boy George, George Michael, John Galliano, Judy Blame, Bodymap, Michael Clark, John Maybury, Cerith Wyn Evans. Taboo lasted 18 months and closed in 1986.

== Fashion and costume design ==
As a fashion designer, Bowery had several shows exhibiting his collections in London, New York and Tokyo. His work contained wildly creative costumes, makeup, wigs and headgear, all of which combined to be striking and often kitschy. He also designed costumes for the Michael Clark Dance Company. When that company performed at the Brooklyn Academy of Music in 1987, Bowery won a Bessie Award for his work on No Fire Escape in Hell.

== Performance artist ==
As a performance artist, Bowery enjoyed creating the costumes, and often shocking audiences. Working alongside Michael Clark, he would often have solo scenes in many of Clark's shows.

His first one-man installation was in 1988 for a week at the Anthony D'Offay Gallery in London. Hidden behind a two-way mirror he would lie on a 19th-century divan, primping and preening himself at his own reflection, while the audience would watch sitting on the floor from the other side. Each day he changed costumes and so visitors would often come back to see what he would be wearing next. Various traffic sounds would be played over the speaker system during the performance and there was a different smell every day.

In 1990 at the London club night 'Kinky Gerlinky' he introduced his signature 'Birthing' performance. Dressed as the drag performer Divine from 'Female Trouble' he appeared on stage in an oversized t-shirt, dark glasses and headscarf, looking huge and miming along to the film dialogue. Then suddenly, much to the audience's surprise, he dropped onto his back and simulated 'giving birth' to his baby, a petite and naked young woman who was his friend, assistant and later wife Nicola Bateman. She had been hidden for the first part of the performance by being strapped to Leigh's belly with her face in his crotch. Then she would slip out of her harness and appear to pop out of Bowery's belly, bursting through his tights, along with a lot of stage blood and links of sausages, while Bowery wailed. Bowery would then bite off the umbilical cord, hug his 'new' baby and the two would take a bow. Boy George said he saw it a number of times, and that it "never ceased to impress or revolt".

In mid-1994 one of Bowery's last performances took place at the Fort Asperen Art Festival in Holland, where he and his assistant Nicola and bass player Richard Torry performed to a bemused crowd during the day and fully naked, Richard covered in bright blue balloons. Bowery hung upside down singing into the microphone while Richard pulled him back and forth by the foot until the climax of the song and Bowery smashed himself through a plane of glass, cutting his body. The whole performance lasted five minutes.

== Lucian Freud's model ==
In London in 1988, Bowery met the painter Lucian Freud in his club Taboo. They were introduced by a mutual friend, the artist Cerith Wyn Evans. Freud had seen Bowery perform at Anthony d'Offay Gallery, in London. In Bowery's first public appearance in the context of fine art, Bowery posed behind a one-way mirror in the gallery dressed in a flamboyant costume.

Bowery used his body and manipulation of his flesh to create personas. This involved almost masochistically taping his torso and piercing his cheeks with pins in order to hold masks, as well as wearing outlandish makeup. Freud said, "the way he edits his body is amazingly aware and amazingly abandoned". In return, Bowery said of Freud: "I love the psychological aspect of his work – in fact, I sometimes felt as if I had been undergoing psychoanalysis with him ... His work is full of tension. Like me, he is interested in the underbelly of things".

Bowery posed for a number of large full-length paintings that are considered among Freud's best work. The paintings tend to exaggerate Bowery's 6-foot-3-inch (1.91 m), 17-stone (110 kg; 240 lb) physique to monumental proportions. The paintings had a strong impact as part of Freud's exhibition at the Metropolitan Museum of Art in 1994. Freud said he found him "perfectly beautiful", and commented, "His wonderfully buoyant bulk was an instrument I felt I could use, especially those extraordinary dancer's legs". Freud noted that Leigh by nature was a shy and gentle man, and his flamboyant persona was in part a form of self-defence.

Jonathan Jones, writing for The Guardian, describes Freud's portrait, Leigh Bowery (seated):

Bowery is a character out of Renaissance art – perhaps Silenus, the companion of Dionysus. His flesh is a magnificent ruin, at once damaged and riotously alive. Who knew skin was so particoloured? To count the hues of even one of his feet is impossible: purple, grey, yellow, brown, the paint creamy, calloused, bulging. In a velvet chair tilted down towards us on the raked stage of the wooden studio floor, his mass looms up and dwarfs us. Walk close your eyes are probably the height of his penis. Bowery's violet-domed, wrinkly tube hangs between thighs marked with sinister spots or cuts his knees are massive. Bowery is a painted monument who quietly contemplates his existence inside this flesh.

== Minty ==
A promotional still from the documentary The Legend of Leigh Bowery

In 1993, Bowery formed the Romo/art-pop band Minty, with friend knitwear designer Richard Torry, Nicola Bateman, and Matthew Glamorre.

In November 1994, Minty began a two-week-long show at London's Freedom Cafe, including audience member Alexander McQueen, but it was too much for Westminster City Council, who closed down the show after only one night. This was to be Bowery's last performance. The show was documented by photographer A.M. Hanson with imagery subsequently published in books about Bowery and McQueen.

Minty was a financial loss and represented a low point in Bowery's career. After his death, the band continued under the leadership of Bateman and Glammore up until the release of album Open Wide. This 1997 album was released on Candy Records and featured the singles "Useless Man", "Plastic Bag", "Nothing" and "That's Nice". A spin-off band called The Offset later formed including artist Donald Urquhart.

In 2020, Open Wide was re-issued by Candy Records in association with The state51 Conspiracy, while "Useless Man" received a remix by Boy George and a new promo video directed by Torry and Glammore.

== Personal life ==
Although Bowery was openly gay, he married his long-time female companion Nicola Bateman on 13 May 1994 in Tower Hamlets, London, in "a personal art performance". Although he had been HIV positive for six years, very few of those who knew him guessed that; he typically explained his public absence by saying he had gone to Papua New Guinea.

His wife did not know that Bowery had HIV until he was admitted to hospital in late November 1994. He died seven months after their marriage, on New Year's Eve 1994 (the date has been disputed by his father, who says he actually died in the early hours of New Year's Day, 1995), from an AIDS-related illness at the Middlesex Hospital, Westminster, London, five weeks after his admission. Lucian Freud paid for Bowery's body to be repatriated to Australia.

== Taboo, the musical ==
Boy George was the lyricist and performer in the musical Taboo, which was loosely based on Bowery's club. The musical was produced in 2002 on the West End in London, and then opened on Broadway. As a performer, Boy George played Bowery.

In an interview Boy George said that Bowery would sometimes speak with a posh English accent, and one did not always know if he was sincere or mocking, as he seemed to be "in character" at all times. Bowery decorated his flat in a style that was similar to the way he dressed, with Star Trek-themed wallpaper, mirrors and a large piano. He was a ringleader of misbehaviour, and with his club, he created a place where there were no rules. In the clubs at the peak of his fame, he would distort his body in various ways so that he would appear deformed, or pregnant or with breasts. Bowery once said, "Flesh is my most favourite fabric".

== In popular culture ==
Bowery influenced other artists and designers including Meadham Kirchhoff, Alexander McQueen, Lucian Freud, Vivienne Westwood, Boy George, Antony and the Johnsons, Lady Gaga, John Galliano, Scissor Sisters, David LaChapelle, Lady Bunny, Acid Betty, Shea Couleé, and Charles Jeffrey plus numerous Nu-Rave bands and nightclubs in London and New York City.

Bowery was the main inspiration for the Tranimal drag movement, which emphasised an animalistic and post-modern take on drag.

Bowery was the subject of a small retrospective art exhibition 'Look At Me' at the RMIT Gallery at the Royal Melbourne Institute of Technology (RMIT) in Melbourne, Victoria, Australia in February–March 1999, curated by Robert Buckingham and Rachel Young. This is the same institution Bowery briefly studied fashion at in the 1970s.

Bowery was the subject of a retrospective art exhibition 'Take a Bowery: The Art and (larger Than) Life of Leigh Bowery' at the Museum of Contemporary Art Australia (MCA) in Sydney, Australia in December 2003-March 2004, curated by Artist, Art lecturer, curator and author Gary Carsley.

Bowery is the subject of a retrospective art exhibition 'Leigh Bowery!' at Tate Modern in London, England from February 2025-August 2025, curated by the Tate in collaboration with Nicola Rainbird (Nicola Bowery, nee Bateman), Director and Owner of the Estate of Leigh Bowery.

Bowery was the subject of a contemporary dance, physical theatre and circus show in August 2018 at the Edinburgh Fringe Festival, by Australian choreographer Andy Howitt.

== Publications ==
- Leigh Bowery: Performative Costuming and Live Art, Sofia Vranou, Intellect (2025), ISBN 978-183595123-1
- Leigh Bowery Verwandlungskünstler, editor Angela Stief, published by Piet Meyer Verlag, Vienna, (2015); ISBN 978-3-90579-931-6
- Leigh Bowery Looks, by Leigh Bowery, Fergus Greer, published by Thames & Hudson Ltd; New Ed edition (2005); ISBN 0-500-28566-7
- Leigh Bowery Looks by Leigh Bowery, Fergus Greer, published by Violette Editions (2006); ISBN 1-900-82827-8
- Leigh Bowery: The Life and Times of an Icon, Sue Tilley. Paperback editions: Hodder & Stoughton, London, (1997, 1998, 1999), ISBN 034069310X ISBN 978-0340693100 Kindle Editions: Open Road Media, 2011, 2014 ISBN 9781453203613, ISBN 9781306599252, ISBN 1306599253, Endeavour Keys, 2019, Lume Books, 2019.
- Leigh Bowery, Violette Editions, London, (1998), ISBN 978-1-90082-804-8
- Take a Bowery: The Art and (larger Than) Life of Leigh Bowery, Retrospective catalogue, Gary Carsley, Museum of Contemporary Art Sydney (MCA) Sydney, Australia (2003), ISBN 1875632905, ISBN 978-1875632909
- Leigh Bowery: Fabulous Master of Disguise, Museum of Contemporary Art Sydney (MCA)/Darian Zam Publishing, Sydney, Australia (2003), Tate Modern/Darian Zam Publishing, London, England (2025), ISBN 978-0-9945186-4-4
- Leigh Bowery: The Life and Times of an Icon, Sue Tilley, Thames & Hudson, London, (2025), ISBN 0500298556 ISBN 978-0500298558

== Discography ==
=== Minty ===
==== Album ====
- Open Wide (Candy Records, CAN 2LP/CAN 2CD, LP/CD, 1997)

Produced by Kramer at Noise New Jersey

All tracks are written by Minty.

No.	Title	Length
1.	"Procession"	4:53
2.	"Minty"	3:56
3.	"That's Nice"	3:27
4.	"Plastic Bag"	3:35
5.	"Useless Man"	4:21
6.	"Homage (Duet For Piano And Wineglass)"	1:28
7.	"Manners Mean"	2:20
8.	"King Size"	4:32
9.	"Hold On"	3:26
10.	"Nothing"	3:46
11.	"Homme Aphrodite (Part 1)"	3:34
12.	"Homme Aphrodite (Part 2)"	2:46
13.	"Dream"	1:28
14.	"Art?"	4:22
15.	"Jeremy"	3:53

==== Singles ====
Year	Title (Format)	Tracks	(Label) Cat#
1994	Useless Man (CD, Maxi)	"Useless Man"	(Candy Records) CAN 1CD
1995	Plastic Bag (CD, Maxi)	"Plastic Bag", "Minty (Live)"	(Sugar) SUGA6CD
1996	That's Nice (CD, Single)	"That's Nice"	(Sugar) SUGA 10CD
1997	Nothing (CD)	"Nothing", "Carol Ginger Baker"	(Candy Records) CAN3CD

All singles also included multiple remixes of the lead tracks.

=== The Offset ===
==== Compilation album ====
- The Offset Presents Minty – It's A Game - Part I (Poppy Records, POPPYCD6, 1997)

No.	Title	Writer(s)	Length
1.	"It's A Game - Part I (Radio Edit)"	Minty	3:27
2.	"Isadora Grand Prix"	That Donald, Donald Urquhart	1:42
3.	"Glug Glug Car"	Sexton Ming, Billy Childish	3:23
4.	"Extract"	Neil Kaczor	1:59
5.	"It's A Game - Part I (12" Version)"	Minty	7:32

== Partial videography ==
- Hail the New Puritan (1985–6), Charles Atlas
- Because We Must (1987), Charles Atlas
- Generations of Love (1990), Baillie Walsh for Boy George
- Unfinished Sympathy (1991), Art Director for Massive Attack single
- Teach (1992), Charles Atlas
- A Smashing Night Out (1994), Matthew Glamorre
- Death in Vegas (1994), Mark Hasler
- Performance at Fort Asperen (1994)
- Flour (single screen version) (1995), Angus Cook
- U2: Popmart - Live from Mexico City (1997), Dancer during 'Lemon Mix'
- Read Only Memory (estratto) (1998), John Maybury
- “Wigstock: The documentary” (1995), Lady Bunny

== See also ==
- Club Kids
