= Princess Julia =

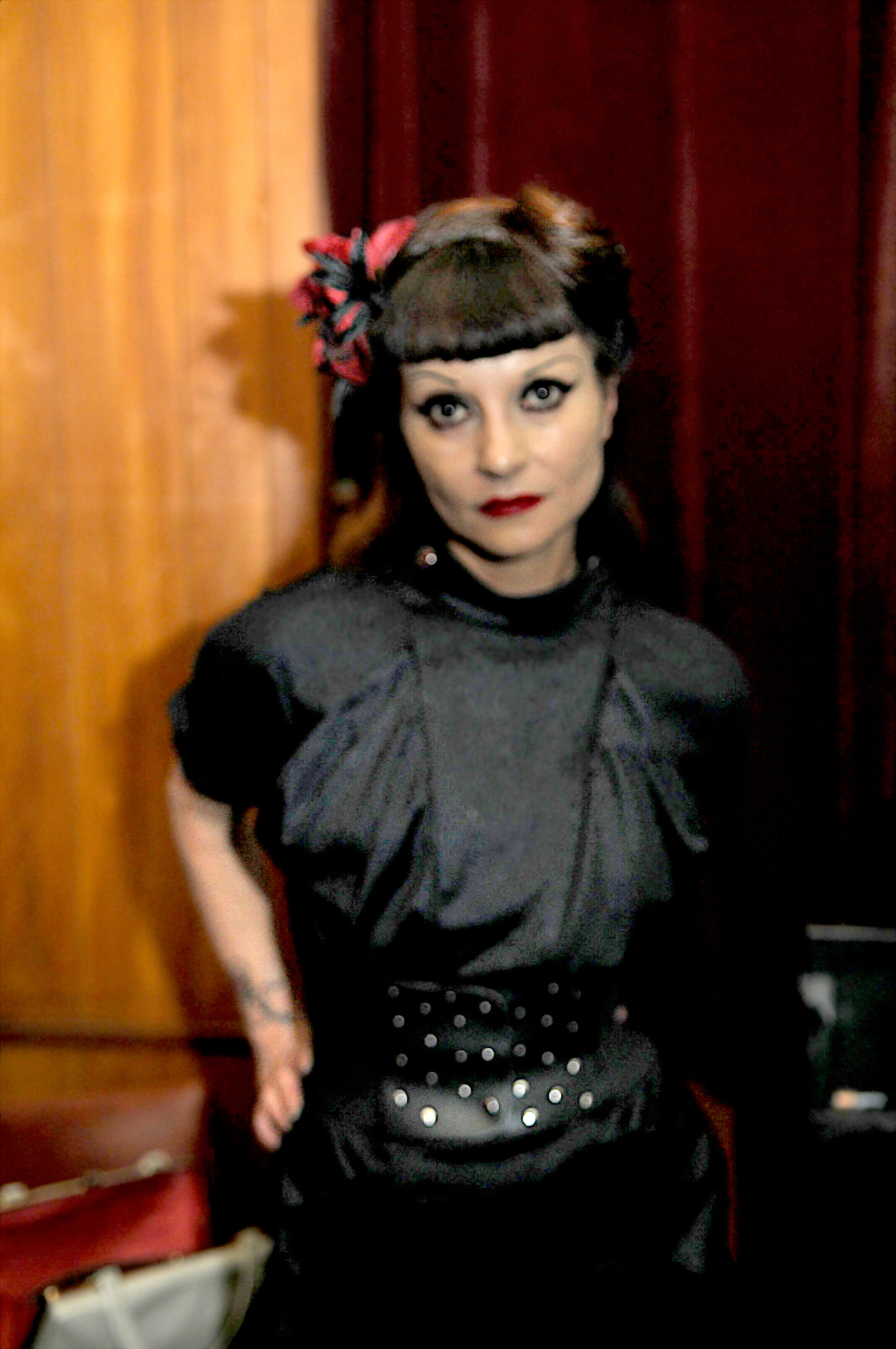
- Julia Fodor in 2008

Background information
- Born: Julia Fodor; 8 April 1960 (age 66); Hackney, London, England
- Genres: Electronic; alternative; pop
- Years active: 1981–present

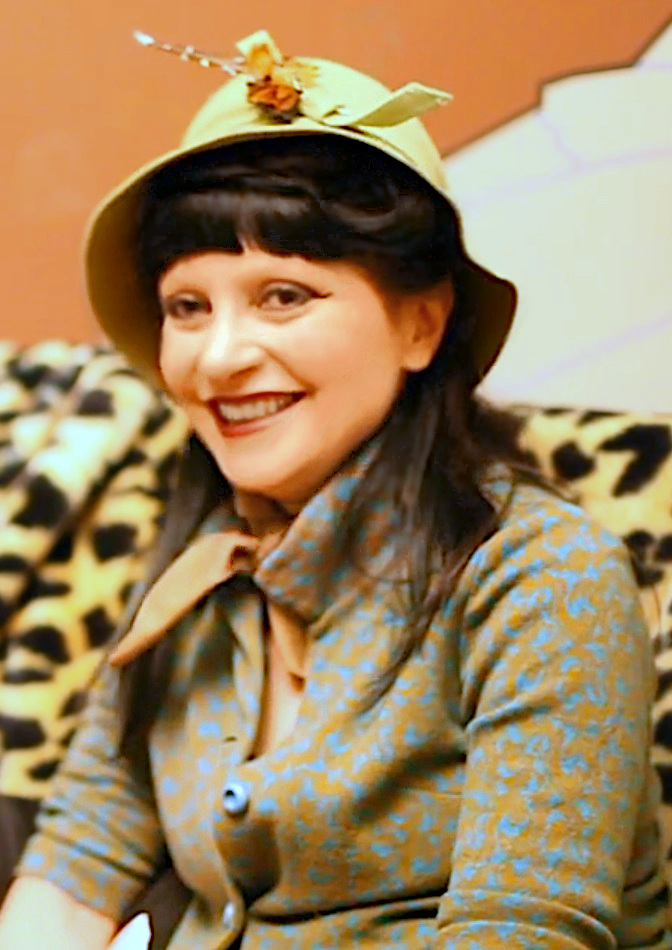
Princess Julia in 2011

Princess Julia (born Julia Fodor, 8 April 1960) is an English DJ and music writer who has also been called the "first lady of London's fashion scene".

== Biography ==
Princess Julia first came to notice in the early 1980s as part of the short-lived Blitz Kids club scene with the likes of Boy George. She achieved mild success and clubland renown after her appearance in the video for "Fade to Grey", the UK hit single from Steve Strange's band Visage.

After a stint as a fashion model in the early to mid- 1980s, both in London and Tokyo, she started to build a successful career as a club DJ. She was a resident DJ at the Kinky Gerlinky club nights.

In 2005, pop star Kylie Minogue and her stylist William Baker chose Princess Julia to be part of the stage video for Minogue's successful 'Showgirl—The Greatest Hits' world tour. Julia recreated her Visage video appearance especially for Minogue's live show: "A club section features graphics inspired by i-D magazine, a special film of club legend Princess Julia inspired by the Visage video for "Fade to Grey", and clothes inspired by Katharine Hamnett's iconic slogan T-shirts of the '80s."

After Kylie Minogue's return from illness in 2006, the same video footage was used during Minogue's second 'Showgirl' tour in 2006/2007. Julia's friendship with Minogue continued in 2007, as the two were seen partying together at London's fashionable Boombox club night, as reported on Kylie.com, "Kylie took the role of DJ with her friends William Baker and Princess Julia on Sunday night at Boombox, an established club with a cult following".

In 2006, other musical collaborations included ex-Shakespears Sister/Bananarama singer Siobhan Fahey on two songs, "Bad Blood" and "Pulsatron" which Julia remixed as well as No Bra's underground hit song "Munchausen" and Readers Wifes'[sic] single "Nostalgia". She has also collaborated with dance acts such as Punx Souncheck, Larry Tee, Kinky Roland and Riton.

She co-published music paper/fanzine The P.i.X and regularly contributes to fashion website KCTV.co.uk as well being music editor for i-D magazine. She writes a weekly column, Revoltage and Reportage for cult publication QX, reviewing clubs and writing interviews on bands and various musical projects.

Princess Julia is portrayed in the second episode of Ashes to Ashes, performing "Fade to Grey" with Visage at Blitz. Five years of her life were documented in the book What Would Julia Do, which was compiled by photographer Rebecca Thomas and features Princess Julia and her interactions with designers such as Jonathan Saunders, Louise Grey and James Long.

She continues to DJ. In April 2026 she performed an hour-long set opening each of the five nights of the Pet Shop Boys' "Obscure" concerts at the Electric Ballroom in Camden.

She is influential in London's fashion, music and art scene.
