= New Romantic =

1970s popular culture movement originating in the UK

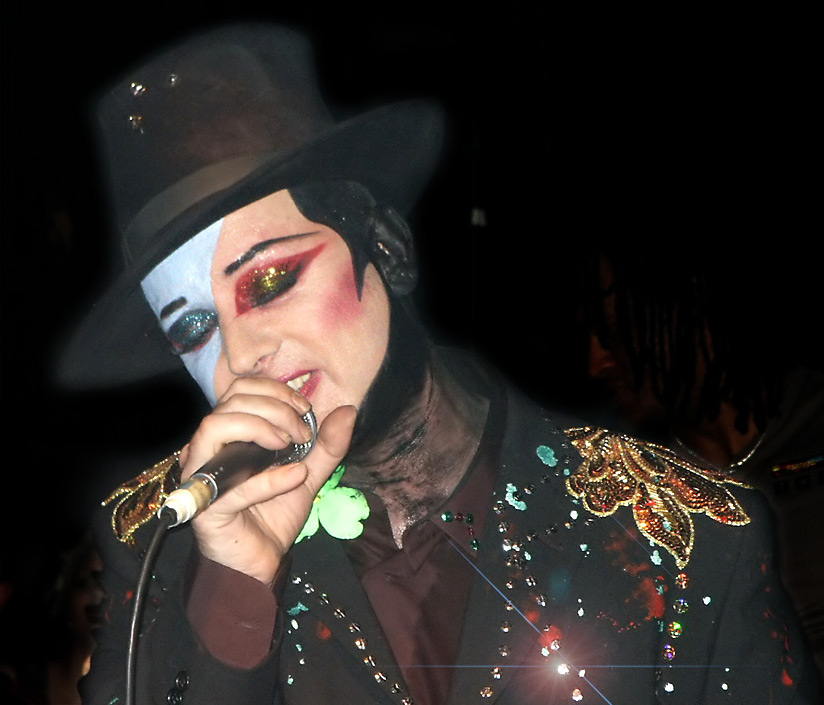
- Boy George performing at Ronnie Scott's Jazz Club in 2001
- Branch: Fashion, music
- Years active: c.1978–1982
- Location: United Kingdom
- Major figures: Steve Strange; Rusty Egan; Spandau Ballet; Boy George; Duran Duran
- Influences: Glam rock; Romanticism; constructivism; Charles Edward Stuart; incroyables and merveilleuses; cabaret; puritans; pierrot
- Influenced: New pop; Romo

New Romantic was an underground subculture movement that originated in the United Kingdom in the late 1970s. The movement emerged from the nightclub scene in London and Birmingham at venues such as Billy's and The Blitz. The New Romantic movement was characterised by flamboyant, eccentric fashion inspired by fashion boutiques such as Kahn and Bell in Birmingham and PX in London. Early adherents of the movement were often referred to by the press by such names as Blitz Kids, New Dandies and Romantic Rebels.

Influenced by David Bowie, Marc Bolan and Roxy Music, the New Romantics developed fashions inspired by the glam rock era coupled with the early Romantic period of the late 18th and early 19th century (from which the movement took its name). The term "New Romantic" is known to have been coined by musician, producer, manager and innovator Richard James Burgess. He stated that "'New Romantic' [...] fit the Blitz scene and Spandau Ballet, although most of the groups tried to distance themselves from it."

Though it was a fashion movement, several British music acts in the late 1970s and early 1980s adopted the style and became known to epitomise it within the press, including Steve Strange of Visage, Duran Duran, Spandau Ballet, A Flock of Seagulls, Classix Nouveaux and Boy George (of Culture Club). Ultravox were also often identified as New Romantics by the press, although they did not exhibit the same visual styles of the movement, despite their link to the band Visage. (Note: During the New Romantic period, two of four Ultravox members—frontman Ure and keyboardist Currie—were also in the then-six-person group Visage.) Japan and Adam and the Ants were also labelled as New Romantic artists by the press, although they both repudiated this and neither had any direct connection to the original scene. Other aspiring bands of the era including ABC, Depeche Mode, the Human League, Soft Cell, Simple Minds, Talk Talk and Orchestral Manoeuvres in the Dark (OMD) have all at some point been described as being part of the New Romantic movement or as having been influenced by it, while others would consider them distinct from it. A number of these bands adopted synthesizers and helped to develop synth-pop in the early 1980s, which, combined with the distinctive New Romantic visuals, helped them first to national success in the UK, and then, via MTV, play a major part in the Second British Invasion of the US charts.

By the beginning of 1982, the original movement had largely dissipated. Although many of the artists associated with the scene continued their careers, some to enormous commercial success in the next few years, they had largely abandoned the aesthetics of the movement. There were attempts to revive the movement in the 1990s, including the short-lived Romo scene.

== Characteristics ==
The New Romantic movement is sometimes characterized as a reaction to the direction in which the punk rock movement was evolving, and was heavily influenced by former glam rock stars of the 1970s such as David Bowie and Roxy Music. In terms of style, it rejected the austerity and anti-fashion stance which was becoming increasingly predominant in punk. Both sexes often dressed in androgynous clothing and wore cosmetics such as eyeliner and lipstick, partly derived from earlier punk fashions. This gender bending was particularly evident in figures such as Boy George of Culture Club, and Marilyn (Peter Robinson).

Fashion was based on varied looks inspired by historical Romantic themes, including frilly fop shirts in the style of the English Romantic period, Russian constructivism, Bonnie Prince Charlie, French Incroyables and 1930s' Cabaret, Hollywood starlets, Puritans and the Pierrot clown, with any look being possible if it was adapted to be unusual and striking. Common hairstyles included quiffs, mullets and wedges. However, soon after they began to gain mainstream attention, many bands associated with the New Romantic scene dropped the eclectic clothes and make-up in favour of sharp suits.

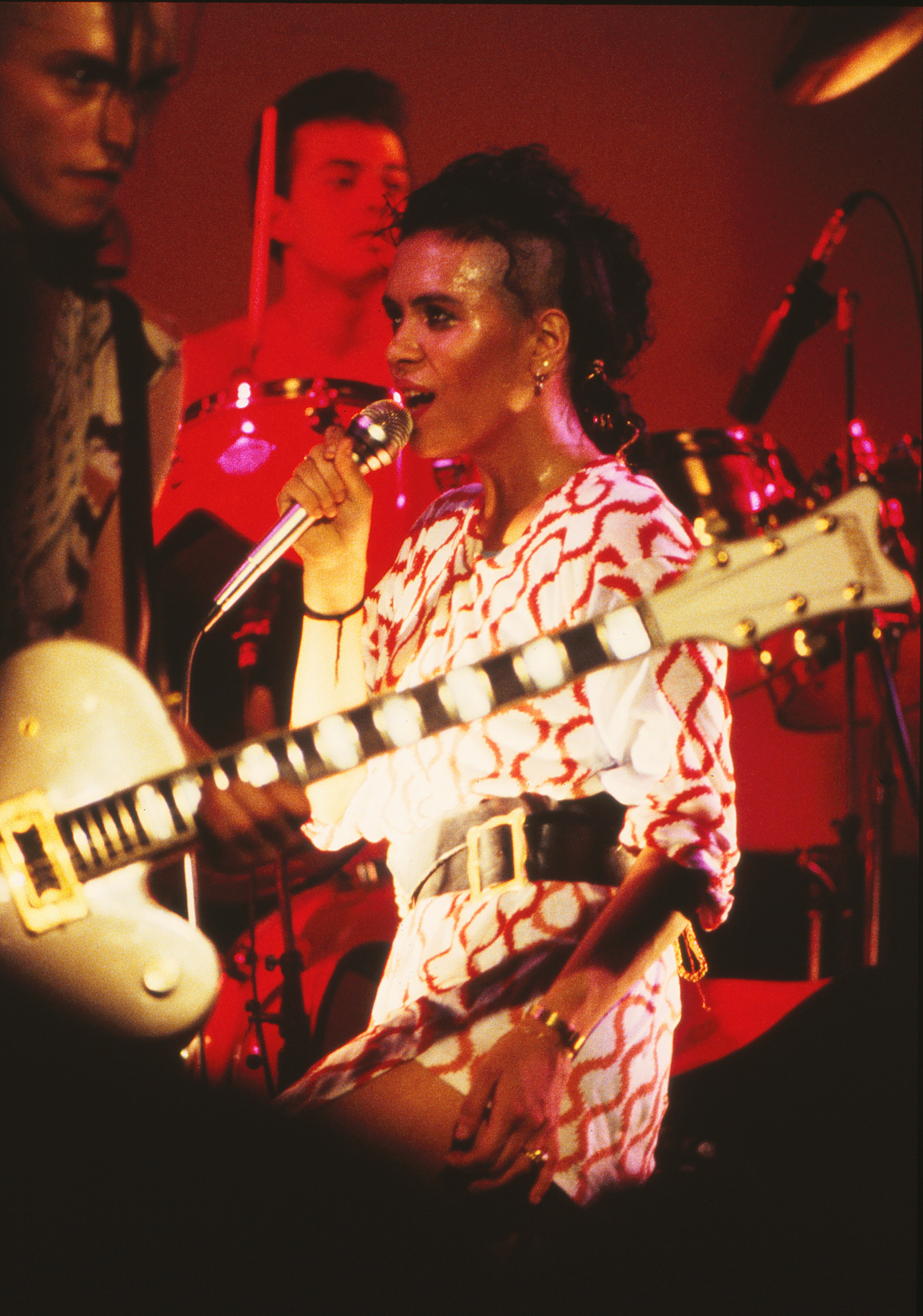
Annabella Lwin performing with Bow Wow Wow in 1982, wearing clothing from Vivienne Westwood's Pirate collection

New Romantic looks were propagated from fashion designers Jane Kahn and Patti Bell in Birmingham and Helen Robinson's Covent Garden shop PX, began to influence major collections and were spread, with a delay, through reviews of what was being worn in clubs via magazines including i-D and The Face. The emergence of the New Romantic movement into the mainstream coincided with Vivienne Westwood's unveiling of her "pirate collection", which was promoted by Bow Wow Wow and Adam and the Ants, who were managed by her then-partner Malcolm McLaren.

Unlike some other bands of the early 1980s, particularly those of the predominantly Midlands-based 2 tone ska revival (the Specials, the Selecter, the Beat) who wrote lyrics addressing social issues such as unemployment and urban decay, the New Romantics adopted an escapist and aspirational stance. With its interest in design, marketing and image, the movement has been seen by some as an acceptance of Thatcherism; style commentator Peter York even suggested that it was aligned with the New Right. Alan Bissett also made the connection, opining "Where New Wave and Ska still represented something of a challenge to the emerging Thatcherite creed, the New Romantics embraced it," whilst Spandau Ballet were labelled "The sound of Thatcherism" by Guardian writer Michael Hann.

== Terminology ==
In its early stages, the movement was known by many names, including "new dandies", "new guys", "romantic rebels", "peacock punk", "the now crowd", "the futurists", "the cult with no name" and eventually as the "Blitz Kids". As the scene moved beyond a single club, the media settled on the name New Romantics.

=== Rejection ===
Adam Ant always denied being a New Romantic, and reiterated this in 2001 and again in 2012. The band Japan also denied any connection with the New Romantic movement, having adopted an androgynous look incorporating make-up ever since their inception in the mid-1970s at the tail-end of the glam rock era (and were then heavily influenced by glam-punk band New York Dolls), some years before the New Romantic movement began. In an October 1981 interview, vocalist David Sylvian commented, "There's a period going past at the moment that may make us look as though we're in fashion." In another interview, he stated "I don't like to be associated with them (New Romantics). The attitudes are so very different." Of Japan's fashion sense, Sylvian said, "For them (New Romantics), fancy dress is a costume. But ours is a way of life. We look and dress this way every day."

Similarly, the electronic duo Soft Cell also denied any connection to the New Romantic scene. In an interview published in January 1984, keyboardist Dave Ball reflected back on their first year of success (1981) and stated, "At this time we were linked to the whole New Romantics thing, but we were never a part of that. It was just a trendy London club thing with Steve Strange."

OMD frontman Andy McCluskey ridiculed the movement in a 2010 interview, saying, "Completely separate from electronic music or the future there was all the fucking Southern New Romantic bollocks. I mean, if we were ever called New Romantics there'd be a fight... 'Am I wearing a kilt? Am I wearing enough eyeliner? Is my shirt frilly enough?' Oh, fuck off!" OMD have nevertheless been categorised as New Romantics; a designation that keyboardist Paul Humphreys likens to "calling a Scotsman 'English'."

== History ==
=== Origins ===
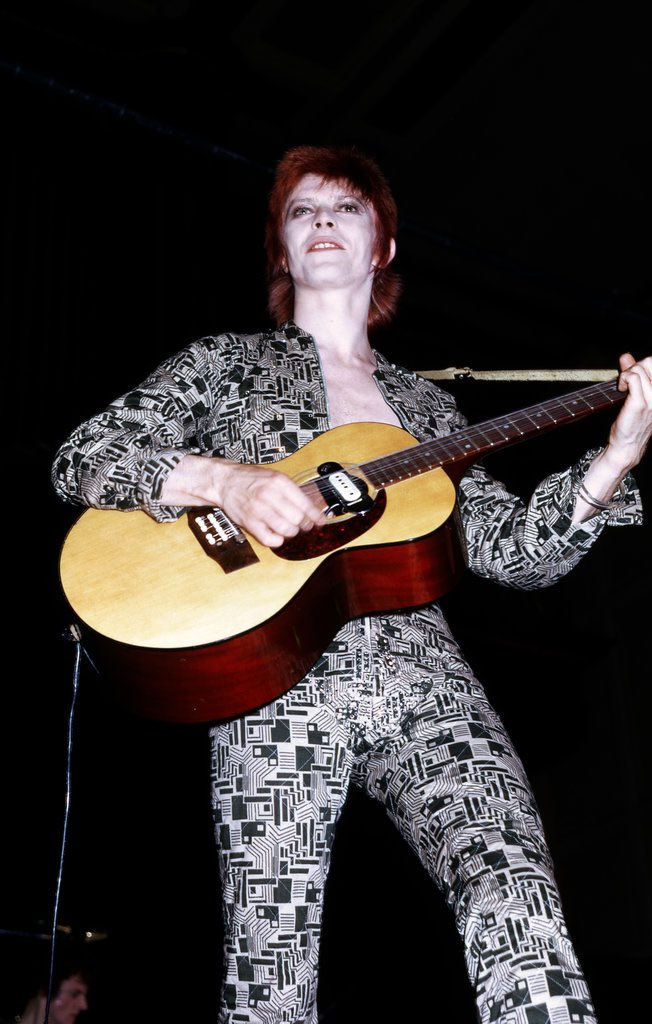
David Bowie's androgynous Ziggy Stardust and the Spiders look, which was a major influence on the movement

The New Romantic movement developed almost simultaneously in London and Birmingham. In London, it grew out of David Bowie and Roxy Music themed nights, run during 1978 in the nightclub Billy's in Dean Street, London. In 1979, the growing popularity of the club forced organisers Steve Strange and Rusty Egan to relocate to a larger venue in the Blitz, a wine bar in Great Queen Street, Covent Garden, where they ran a Tuesday night "Club for Heroes". Its patrons dressed as uniquely as they could in an attempt to draw the most attention.

Steve Strange worked as the club's doorman and Egan was the DJ at the Blitz. The club became known for its exclusive door policy and strict dress code. Strange would frequently deny potential patrons admission because he felt that they were not costumed creatively or subversively enough to blend in with those inside the club. In a highly publicised incident, a drunken Mick Jagger tried to enter the club, but Strange denied him entry. The club spawned several spin-offs and there were soon clubs elsewhere in the capital and in other major British cities, including Manchester, Liverpool and Birmingham.

While still at Billy's, Strange and Egan joined Billy Currie and Midge Ure of Ultravox to form the band Visage. Before forming Culture Club, Boy George and Marilyn worked as cloakroom attendants at the Blitz. The video for David Bowie's 1980 UK number one single "Ashes to Ashes" included appearances by Strange with three other Blitz Kids and propelled the New Romantic movement into the mainstream.

In Birmingham, the origins of the New Romantic movement lay in the opening in 1975 of the Hurst Street shop of the fashion designers Kahn and Bell, whose elaborate and theatrical designs brought together futuristic visual elements and influences as diverse as Egyptian, African and Far Eastern art, and would largely define the movement's look. By 1977, a small scene featuring Jane Kahn and Patti Bell themselves, Martin Degville, Boy George and Patrick Lilley had emerged in pubs such as The Crown and clubs such as Romulus and Barbarella's.

Leeds also developed an early New Romantic scene around 1979, with clubs including the Warehouse, Primos and Le Phonographique. This scene's most notable exponent was Soft Cell, whose vocalist was the Warehouse's DJ and cloakroom worker Marc Almond.

=== Styles of music ===
Many bands that emerged from the New Romantic movement became closely associated with the use of synthesizers to create rock and pop music, which has led to the widespread misconception that synth-pop and the New Romantic movement were synonymous. Synth-pop was prefigured in the 1960s and 1970s by the use of synthesizers in progressive rock, electronic art rock, disco, the "Kraut rock" of bands like Kraftwerk, the three albums made by Bowie with Brian Eno in his "Berlin period", and Yellow Magic Orchestra's early albums.

After the breakthrough of Tubeway Army and Gary Numan in the UK Singles Chart in 1979, large numbers of artists began to enjoy success with a synthesizer-based sound and they came to dominate the pop music of the early 1980s. Bands that emerged from the New Romantic scene and adopted synth-pop included Duran Duran, Visage, and Spandau Ballet. According to authors Stuart Borthwick and Ron Moy, "After the monochrome blacks and greys of punk/new wave, synthpop was promoted by a youth media interested in people who wanted to be pop stars, such as Boy George and Adam Ant".

Early synth-pop has been described as "eerie, sterile, and vaguely menacing", using droning electronics with little change in inflection. Later the introduction of dance beats made the music warmer and catchier and contained within the conventions of three-minute pop. Duran Duran, who emerged from the Birmingham scene, have been credited with incorporating a dance-orientated rhythm section into synth-pop to produce a catchier and warmer sound, which provided them with a series of hit singles.

While many groups associated with the New Romantic movement used synthesizers, some avoided them entirely or made limited use of them. Boy George's band Culture Club, which formed in 1981, produced a sound that combined elements of Motown, Philly soul, reggae, and lovers’ rock. Adam and the Ants and Bow Wow Wow used the African-influenced rhythms of the "Burundi beat".

=== The second British invasion ===
In the US, the cable music channel MTV reached the media capitals of New York City and Los Angeles in 1982. Style-conscious New Romantic synthpop acts became a major staple of MTV programming. They would be followed by many acts over the next three years, with many of them employing synthpop sounds; in fact, Duran Duran's glossy videos symbolised the power of MTV and this Second British Invasion. The switch to a "new music" format in US radio stations was also significant in the success of British bands.

This 1980s invasion had been prefigured in May 1981 when Spandau Ballet, the house band of London's Blitz club, had flown to New York City to stage not only a live gig but a fashion show by the Axiom collective of designers, who included Sade Adu. These former Blitz Kids, "21 in number and 21 their average age" came by invitation of Jim Fouratt who hosted the event at the Underground club.

During 1983, 30% of the US record sales were from British acts. On 18 July 1983, 18 singles in the top 40, and six in the top 10, were by British artists. Newsweek ran an issue which featured Annie Lennox and Boy George on the cover of one of its issues, with the caption "Britain Rocks America – Again", while Rolling Stone would release an "England Swings" issue with Boy George on the cover. In April 1984, 40 of the top 100 singles; further, in a May 1985 survey, eight of the top 10 singles were by acts of British origin.

=== Decline and revivals ===
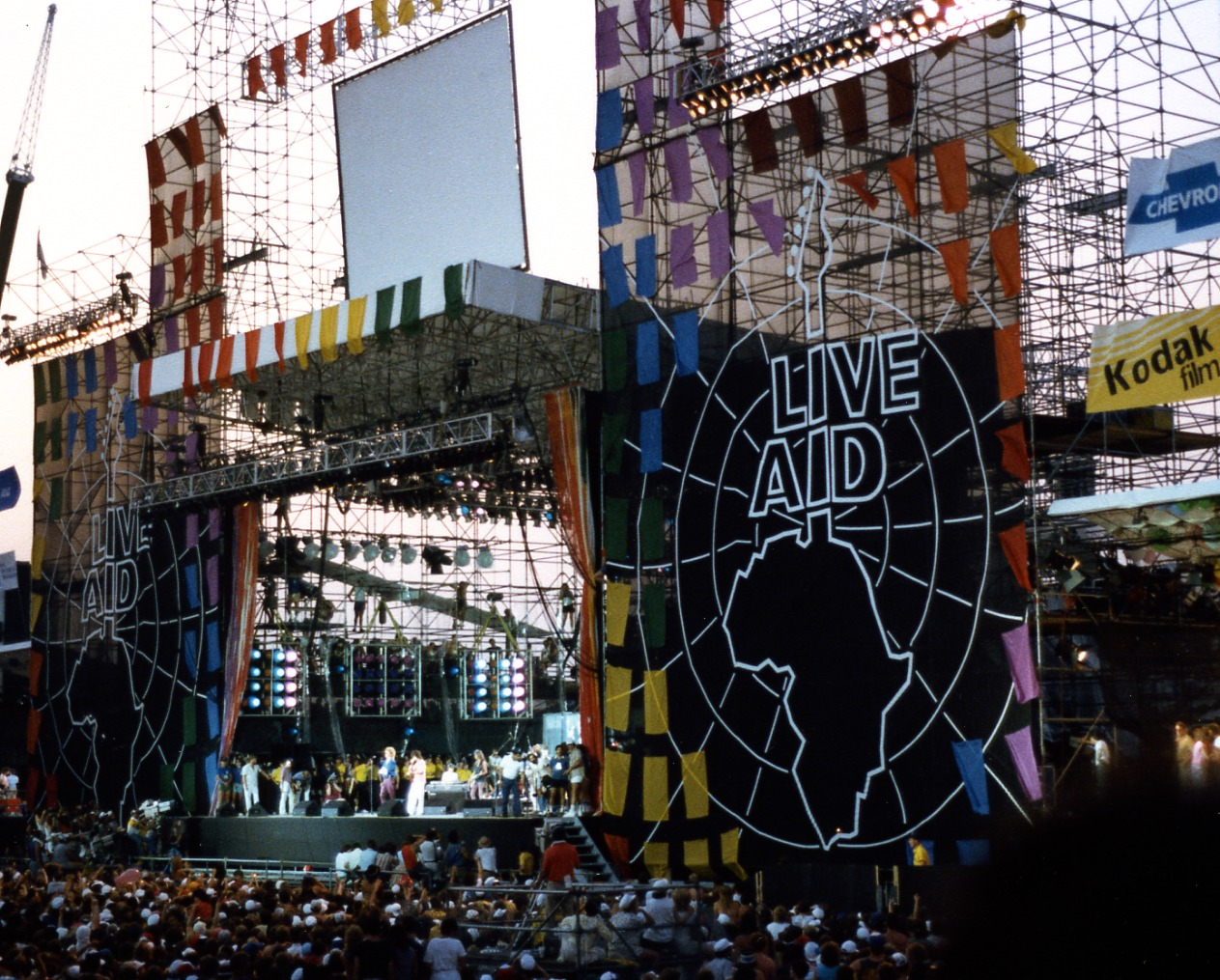
The Live Aid stage at the JFK Stadium in Philadelphia in July 1985, where Duran Duran played, while Ultravox and Spandau Ballet appeared on the Wembley stage in the UK

Music journalist Dave Rimmer considered the Live Aid concert of July 1985 as the peak for the various acts that rose from the New Romantic scene of the early '80s, commenting that after which "everyone seemed to take hubristic tumbles". Simon Reynolds also notes the "Do They Know It's Christmas?" single in late 1984 and Live Aid in 1985 as turning points, with the acts that the movement spawned as having become decadent, with "overripe arrangements and bloated videos" for songs like Duran Duran's "The Wild Boys" and Culture Club's "The War Song". The proliferation of acts using synthesisers had led to an anti-synth backlash, with groups including Spandau Ballet, Soft Cell, and ABC incorporating more conventional influences and instruments into their sounds by 1983.

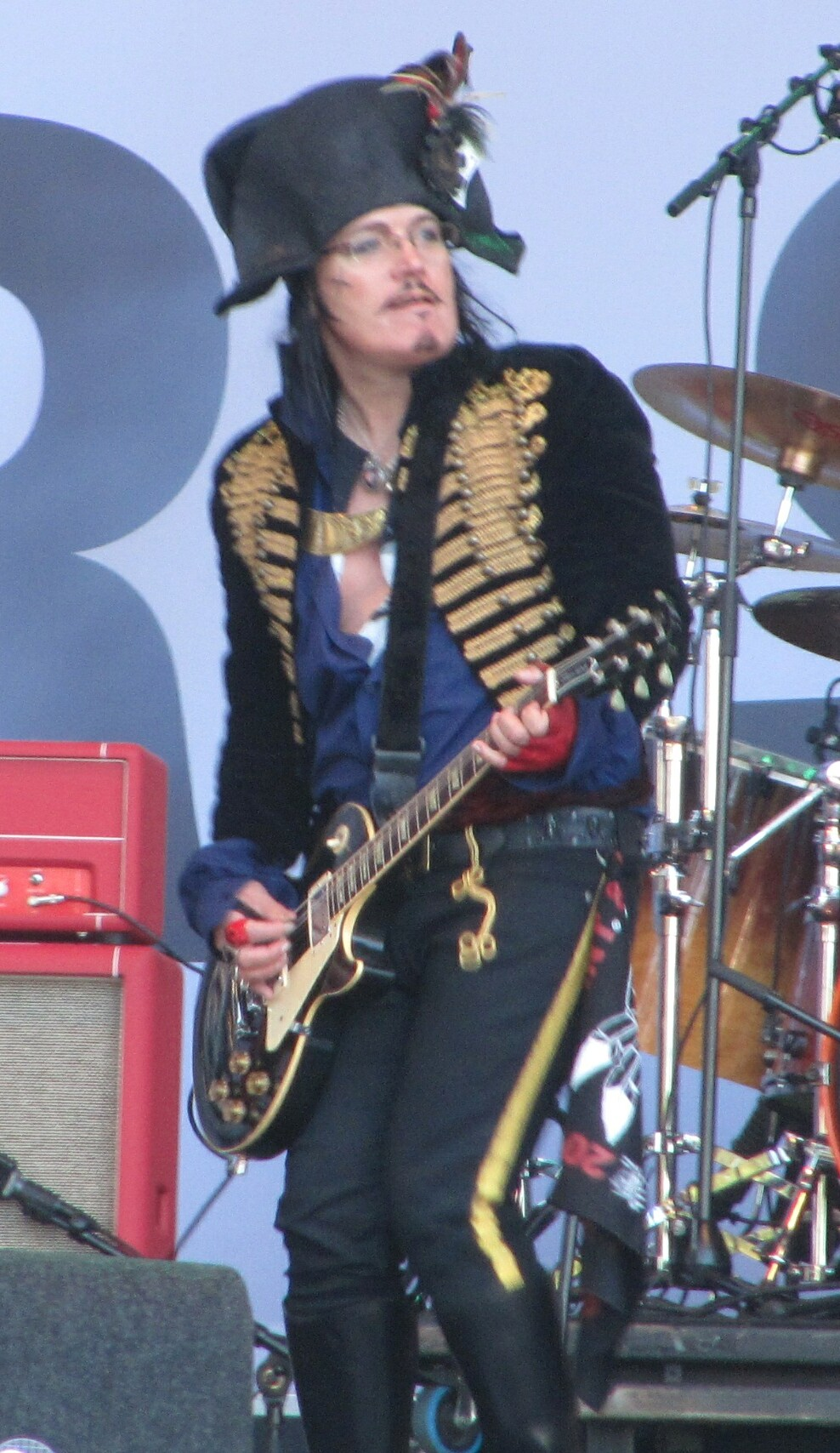
Pop star Adam Ant, seen here in 2012, wearing New Romantic-inspired clothing reminiscent of his early 80s period: hussar jacket, pirate shirt and leather gloves

An American reaction against European synthpop and "haircut bands" has been seen as beginning in the mid-1980s with the rise of heartland rock and roots rock. In the UK, the appearance of indie music, epitomized by the Smiths, was portrayed by the music press as a reaction to New Romantic synthpop and the decline of New Pop. By the end of the 1980s, many New Romantic acts had been dropped by their labels and the solo careers of many artists who had been associated with the New Romantic scene would gradually fade over time.

In the mid-1990s, the New Romantic era was the subject of nostalgia-oriented club nights — such as the Human League-inspired "Don't You Want Me", and "Planet Earth", a Duran Duran-themed night club whose promoter told The Sunday Times, "It's more of a celebration than a revival". In the same period it was also an inspiration for the Romo musical movement. It was championed by Melody Maker, who featured the scene - proclaiming that it was a "future pop explosion" - on its front cover in 1995 and inside claiming that Britpop had been "executed" to make way for it, and including bands Orlando, Plastic Fantastic, Minty, Viva, Sexus, Hollywood and DexDexTer. None of the Romo acts made the British top 75 in their own right, although Orlando charted at number 65 with "How Can We Hang on to a Dream" as part of the Fever Pitch soundtrack EP. After an unsuccessful Melody Maker-organised tour, most of the bands soon broke up.

== Documentaries and films ==
In March 2021, Bruce Ashley's documentary Blitzed: The 80's Blitz Kids' Story, was shown on Sky Arts. Boy George, Rusty Egan and Marilyn all appeared in the film discussing their time at the club and about the early 1980s-era, whilst La Roux was interviewed about the cultural effects of the New Romantic movement on younger performers like herself.

Although it received less media coverage than London, the Birmingham scene, featuring the likes of Khan and Bell, is covered (to an extent) in the 2018 novel Blonde Boy, Red Lipstick. Some of the main characters from the New Romantic movement feature in the book, albeit under different names.

Tramps!, directed by Kevin Hegge, premiered in 2022.

== See also ==
- List of New Romantics
