= Mayhem (Lady Gaga album) =

2025 studio album by Lady Gaga

- Standard cover

Studio album by Lady Gaga
- Released: March 7, 2025
- Studios: Shangri-La (Malibu) Glenwood Place (Burbank)
- Genre: Synth-pop
- Length: 53:04
- Labels: Streamline; Interscope
- Producers: Lady Gaga; Andrew Watt; Cirkut; Gesaffelstein; D'Mile; Bruno Mars

Lady Gaga chronology
Joker: Folie à Deux (2024)	Mayhem (2025)	Apple Music Live: Mayhem Requiem (2026)

Singles from Mayhem
- 1. "Disease" Released: October 25, 2024; 2. "Abracadabra" Released: February 3, 2025

Singles from Mayhem (reissue)
- 1. "The Dead Dance" Released: September 3, 2025

Mayhem (stylized in all caps) is the sixth solo studio album by American singer and songwriter Lady Gaga and her eighth overall. (Note: Mayhem is Gaga's eighth studio album when including her collaborative albums with Tony Bennett, Cheek to Cheek (2014) and Love for Sale (2021). Occasionally, her debut album, The Fame (2008), and its reissue The Fame Monster (2009) are counted separately, which would make Mayhem her seventh solo album and ninth overall.) It was released on March 7, 2025, through Streamline and Interscope Records. Recording took place at Rick Rubin's Shangri-La studio in Malibu. Gaga collaborated with producers such as Andrew Watt, Cirkut, and Gesaffelstein, resulting in an album that has a "chaotic blur of genres", mainly synth-pop, with industrial dance influences, and elements of electro, disco, funk, industrial pop, rock and pop rock. Thematically, it explores love, chaos, fame, identity, and desire, using metaphors of transformation, duality, and excess. The accompanying visuals are characterized by a dark, avant-garde aesthetic with gothic and cyberpunk influences.

The album was preceded by two singles: the lead single "Disease", released on October 25, 2024, and the Grammy-winning track "Abracadabra", released on February 3, 2025, with the latter reaching number five on the Billboard Global 200. Mayhem also features the Grammy-winning global number-one duet with Bruno Mars, "Die with a Smile", as well as "The Dead Dance" on its digital reissue. To promote the record, Gaga made several televised appearances, and created The Art of Personal Chaos, a theatrical concert production. An initial iteration of the show served as the basis for major 2025 performances, including Coachella and a free Copacabana Beach show that drew a record-breaking crowd. (Note: The concert attracted the largest crowd ever recorded for a female artist. Promoter Live Nation and Gaga's representatives estimated an audience of 2.5 million, while local authorities reported 2.1 million.) An expanded version was incorporated into her eighth concert tour, The Mayhem Ball (2025–2026). Both incarnations of the show received significant praise. Gaga also staged a one-off concert, Mayhem Requiem, in Los Angeles in January 2026, which was commemorated in a live album and concert film.

Mayhem received critical acclaim, with reviewers deeming it a strong return to Gaga's pop roots, particularly reminiscent of The Fame (2008). It was applauded for its production, stylistic diversity, artistic boldness, and cohesive blend of genres and concepts. It became Gaga's highest-rated release on Metacritic. Mayhem received multiple nominations at the 68th Annual Grammy Awards, including Album of the Year, and won Best Pop Vocal Album. The record topped the charts in 22 countries and reached number two in France, the Netherlands, and Sweden. In the United States, it became Gaga's seventh album to top the Billboard 200, achieving the largest first-week sales of 2025 for a female album, a record it held for six months. The album also received platinum certifications in Belgium, Brazil, Canada, France, Italy, New Zealand, Poland, Switzerland, and the United States. According to the International Federation of the Phonographic Industry (IFPI), Mayhem was the ninth global best-selling album of 2025.

== Background ==
In 2022, Gaga embarked on the Chromatica Ball and began working on new material. For several months prior to the album's announcement, Gaga shared photographs on social media of herself in a recording studio. In March 2024, Gaga spoke publicly about the project for the first time, stating in an interview that she was "writing some of the best songs I can remember".

The following May, she released the concert film Gaga Chromatica Ball (2024), which contained a snippet of new music at the end. Gaga has said that the upcoming pop album was made "from a place of happiness". Her fiancé Michael Polansky recommended that she create a pop album and "lean in to the joy of it". In mid-2024, Gaga began offering additional teasers for her new project. In July, she surprised fans by playing snippets of two unreleased songs after her performance at the opening ceremony of the 2024 Summer Olympics. During a December 2024 interview with the Los Angeles Times, Gaga announced her duet with Bruno Mars, "Die with a Smile", would be part of the album.

== Development ==
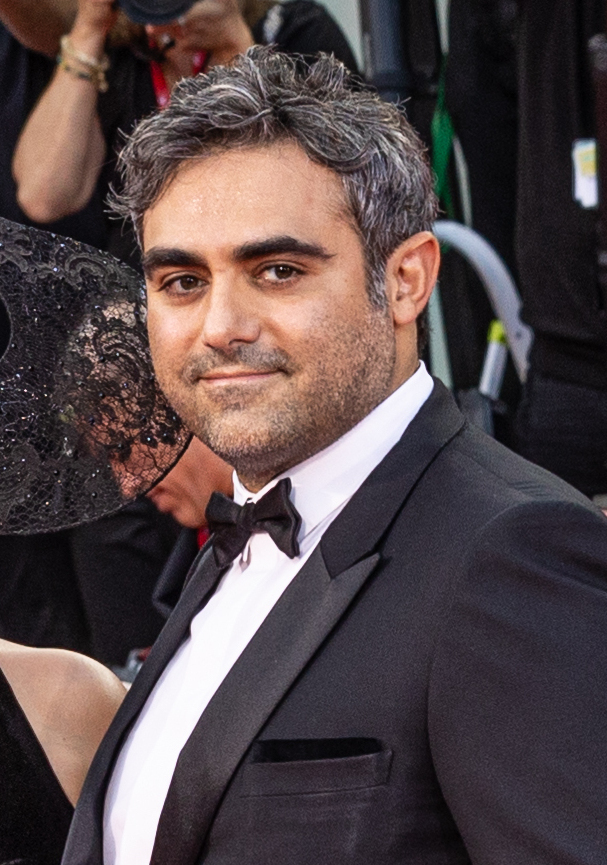
Gaga's fiancé Michael Polansky (pictured) served as an executive producer of Mayhem, alongside Watt and Gaga herself.

According to Gaga, the inspiration for the album stemmed from a period of deep introspection and personal challenges. Gaga, Andrew Watt and Polansky are listed as the executive producers of Mayhem. She described the album as "a transgressive journey through genres" that reflects her diverse musical influences and life experiences. In an interview with Rolling Stone on December 10, 2024, Gaga characterized the project as an eclectic work that amalgamates various genres, styles, and emotions, all guided by her profound love of music. She elaborated:

The album is imbued with my love for music: a diversity of genres, styles, and dreams. It leaps from one genre to another in a manner that feels almost corrupt, and it culminates in love. That's my answer to all the chaos in my life: I find peace in love. Every song I wrote emerged from surrendering to different dreams tied to my past, almost like a recollection of all the bad decisions I've made throughout my life. There are moments where we sonically push the sound to extremes, and others where everything revolves around love. That, to me, represents true chaos. It's sometimes difficult to see the light, but I think what makes inner chaos more challenging is when you occasionally catch a glimpse of the sun. For this reason, the album offers a bit of everything. It's a complete experience.

Regarding her inspiration, the artist stated, "The album started as me facing my fear of returning to the pop music my earliest fans loved," further comparing the creative process to "reassembling a shattered mirror: even if you can't put the pieces back together perfectly, you can create something beautiful and whole in its own new way". Gaga has called the album, which was inspired by industrial dance music, "chaotic" and "genre-bending". An unspecified song from the record has been described by Jonathan Van Meter of Vogue as "intense and ominous... old-school Gaga banger, unsettling but also buoyant". French DJ and record producer Gesaffelstein collaborated on the album.

== Writing and recording ==
In May 2024, during a Q&A session following the premiere of her special Gaga Chromatica Ball, Gaga revealed that she was deeply immersed in writing and recording the album. She described the material as "completely different from anything I've done before" and emphasized her exploration of breaking musical genres and incorporating new creative influences. Gaga explained that each song is a reflection of her own internal chaos, presented with a celebratory tone aimed at connecting with audiences in various settings, from a party to an intimate moment at home.

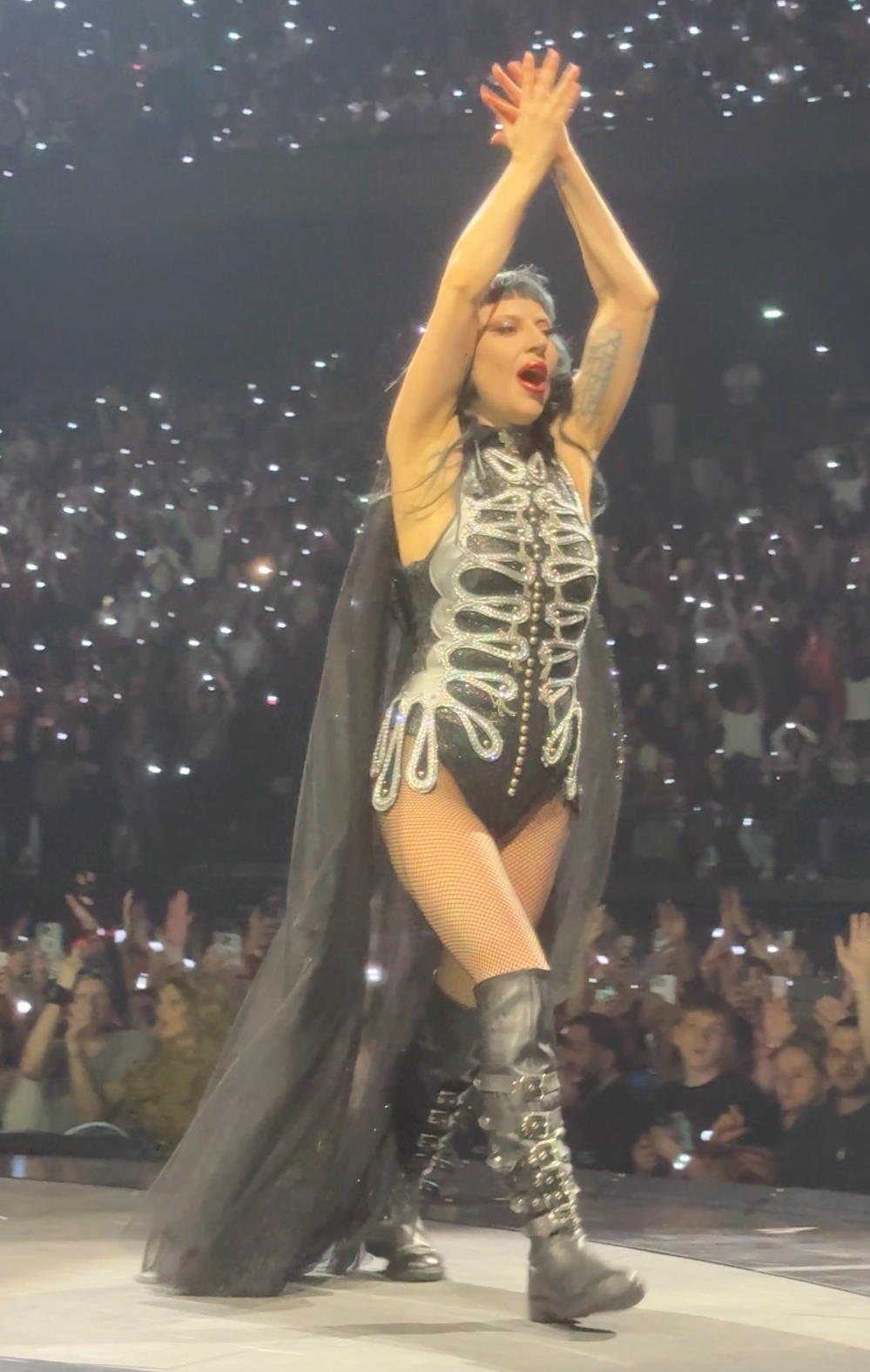
Gaga performing "Vanish into You", the first track written for the album, at the Mayhem Ball tour

She later stated that she wrote and recorded over 50 songs for the project, selecting 14 for the standard edition. During a "Little Monster Press Conference", Gaga revealed that the first song she wrote for Mayhem was "Vanish into You", while the last was "Die with a Smile". She referred to it as "a return to an earlier process" involving live instrumentation and analog experimentation. The album was recorded at Rick Rubin's studio Shangri-La, in Malibu, California, where Gaga also made Joanne (2016) and the soundtrack to A Star Is Born (2018). Additional recording sessions took place at The Village Studios in West Los Angeles, Henson Recording Studios in Hollywood, and Shampoo Press & Curl Studios. All tracks were mixed at MixStar Studios in Virginia Beach and mastered at Sterling Sound in Edgewater, New Jersey.

Producer Cirkut told Billboard that the goal with Mayhem's lead single, "Disease", was to capture "the essence of Gaga" with "a fresh spin on it". He described it as "bold and aggressive", aiming for a dramatic, theatrical sound that "immediately impacts the listener". Producer Watt called the recording process "spontaneous", recalling how "Gaga hears something, grabs the microphone, and flows". He added that "Abracadabra" was created on the spot, with Gaga developing the melody and structuring it on piano. According to Gaga, the song came together within minutes, in contrast to other tracks on the album that required longer development, reinforcing her description of the project as a return to an instinctive, live-driven approach. Regarding her collaboration with Mars, Gaga said she received a call one night during the recording sessions, and they met at a nearby studio. That night, they completed "Die with a Smile", drawing on 1970s-style harmonies and artists like Carole King and James Taylor. Watt said the session was entirely live, with Gaga writing chords and bass lines while Mars played guitar. Although initially not planned for the album, Gaga described the track as the "missing piece" that unified its themes of love, chaos, and reconciliation, while Watt affirmed it was always meant to be part of the project, since it was recorded during the Mayhem sessions.

== Artistic direction ==
The Mayhem era was defined by a dark, avant-garde aesthetic with gothic influences. Throughout the album's promotion, Gaga wore monochromatic outfits that reinforced this concept, blending references from cyberpunk, goth, and high fashion. This style has drawn comparisons to her Born This Way (2011) era, albeit with a more minimalist and futuristic approach. Gaga described the aesthetic as "something anxious at its core, yet with a poetic and visually striking approach despite its darkness". She also noted that the artistic direction of the project was influenced by the anxiety she experiences while creating music—a feeling that, according to her, permeates the entire process until her ideas take tangible form. In an interview with InStyle, she stated that this sensation was also reflected in the album's visual construction, adding: "From a color perspective, I was really excited at first to explore things that were bold, but also maybe a little anxiety-inducing, because there is an anxiety I feel when I make music".

In the music videos, this duality is materialized through characters representing different facets of Gaga's identity. For the video costumes, she collaborated with various designers. In "Disease", she wore creations by Peri Rosenzweig, Nick Royal, Charles de Vilmorin, and Comme des Garçons, while in "Abracadabra", the outfits were designed by Olivier Theyskens and Sam Lewis, with hats by Stephen Jones and Maximilian Gedra, and accessories from Chrome Hearts and Dosisg6c. For the latter video, Gaga emphasized that she worked with her team to minimize the environmental impact of the wardrobe, repurposing materials such as old wedding dresses and discarded fabrics from previous projects. For "The Dead Dance", Colleen Atwood created a Victorian-inspired look with a corset bustier, tiered skirt, and ribbon details; by the end, Gaga appears in a babydoll tank top and puffed pants. The artistic direction of Mayhem's music videos has been compared to The Fame Monster (2009) era for its dark and theatrical aesthetic. Vogue's Christian Allaire described the visual concept as "a twisted fashion fantasy, equal parts glamorous and grotesque," highlighting its avant-garde costumes and makeup. Other outlets, including Rolling Stone, Billboard, and Pitchfork, praised the meticulous fusion of art and high fashion, drawing comparisons to "Bad Romance" (2009) and emphasizing its strong conceptual and cinematic quality. The visual style introduced throughout the album's promotion was later expanded in the wardrobe of the Mayhem Ball, which continued Gaga's exploration of duality through gothic and operatic imagery.

In February 2025, during events like the 67th Annual Grammy Awards and the FireAid Concert, Gaga maintained a cohesive image with dramatic black dresses, structured silhouettes, and striking details such as her mini-bob haircut and bleached eyebrows. At the Grammys, she wore a Victorian-inspired black ensemble by Samuel Lewis, paired with a vintage Tiffany & Co. necklace designed under Louis Comfort Tiffany's direction. A month later, for her Saturday Night Live performance on March 8, she continued this theatrical aesthetic with two contrasting outfits: a structured red ensemble for "Abracadabra", echoing its music video imagery, and a purple outfit for "Killah", which Variety noted as a nod to Prince and glam rock. The magazine described her stage presence as "hyperkinetic," praising both her energy and the meticulous visual direction. After the show, Gaga was spotted wearing a Victoria's Secret bodysuit paired with a headpiece by Spanish designer Betto García, a look that, according to Vogue, showcased "her ability to seamlessly integrate avant-garde fashion into her artistic image".

== Composition ==
According to Gaga, Mayhem is a tribute to her "love for music, bringing together a wide variety of genres, styles, and different dreams". In an interview with the Los Angeles Times, she said the album is heavily influenced by industrial music and other strands of electronic music, explaining: "I've probably been judged for not sticking to just one thing, but not doing so is my life force". She described the sound as "utter chaos" that "breaks a lot of rules and is a lot of fun", citing influences including "'90s alternative, electro-grunge, Prince and David Bowie melodies, guitar and attitude, funky bass lines, French electronic music, and analog synthesizers". From a genre perspective, she added: "It just feels good. It sounds good. It's about following your own chaos to wherever in life it may take you". Slant Magazine stated that Mayhem trades almost entirely in 1980s synth-pop, especially in its middle stretch, from "Zombieboy" to the Bowie-esque "Killah". Rolling Stone described it as a tribute to Gaga's musical influences, calling it "chaotic and ever-changing".

Her fiancé, Michael Polansky, played a key creative role and encouraged her to return to pop music. Gaga explained that his support helped her reconnect with her artistry and described the album as "a renewed happiness" compared to Chromatica. The song "Blade of Grass" was inspired by a conversation between them, and he also convinced her to keep the track "How Bad Do U Want Me" on the album. She stated in interviews that the album marked a break from conceptual constraints and reflected a process of personal rediscovery. Gaga explained:

"While making this album, I truly learned to love myself through all of it. Part of the message... is that your demons are with you at the beginning and at the end... Maybe we can become friends with this reality sooner, instead of constantly running away from it".

=== Music and lyrics ===
"Disease"
A 22-second sample of the lead single "Disease", illustrating the song's mechanical thrum, distorted synths, and industrial-pop pulse, all of which reflect Mayhem's darker sonic palette.

Musically, Mayhem is mainly a synth-pop album, incorporating elements of electro, disco, funk, industrial pop, rock, pop rock, dance, and soft rock. (Note: Attributed to multiple sources:) The album marks Gaga's return to a bolder and more experimental sound, moving away from the aesthetics of Chromatica (2020) and reclaiming the eclectic style that defined her early career. Fusing influences from electro-grunge, theatrical rock, and funk, Mayhem creates a varied yet cohesive production. Rolling Stone described it as "a fusion of her electronic roots with an overwhelming energy," while The Guardian highlighted her ability to blend industrial, house, and disco without losing relevance. NME and Clash agreed that the album represents a return to the artist's "maximalist pop," featuring memorable hooks and production that ranges from eurodance and 1970s funk to sonic experimentation. Meanwhile, The Independent noted that Mayhem stands out for its controlled chaos, merging the intensity of her early work with a polished and modern production.

The singer also emphasized that ballroom culture has been a constant influence on her art, noting that from a young age she was inspired by "the grace, freedom, and expression" of the scene, which she discovered in New York through Paris Is Burning (1990). Beyond its stylistic diversity, Mayhem is also characterized by an unconventional structure, where each song functions as a chapter within the album's overarching concept. According to Gaga, her intention was to "break away from the idea of a single sound" and explore different emotions through music. She told Rolling Stone, "I wanted to revisit old paths while opening new ones, something I think is difficult to do. There are moments on the album where some people might say, 'Oh, that reminds me of this,' because I have a style, but I've made a musical effort to take myself somewhere new". The artist has described the album as "a series of gothic dreams where dance-pop energy, industrial darkness, and rock theatricality coexist".

=== Songs ===
The main themes within Mayhem revolve around fame, identity, desire, and chaos, explored through metaphors of transformation, duality, and excess. The songs address the impact of celebrity, the internal struggle between public image and personal identity, as well as euphoria and debauchery as forms of escapism. The album opens with "Disease", a track that fuses dance-pop, EDM, industrial, rock and rage. Gaga expresses an obsessive desire to heal her lover, delivering "rock-infused and guttural" vocals that drew comparisons to punk. The second track, "Abracadabra", is a dance-pop song with elements of electropop, house and europop. It samples "Spellbound" by Siouxsie and the Banshees, earning co-writing credits for the band. Gaga said the lyrics are about "facing challenges and finding magic". "Garden of Eden", the third track, blends 2000s pop with electronic textures and a distorted chorus. Critics noted its rave-like feel and contrast of euphoria and darkness.

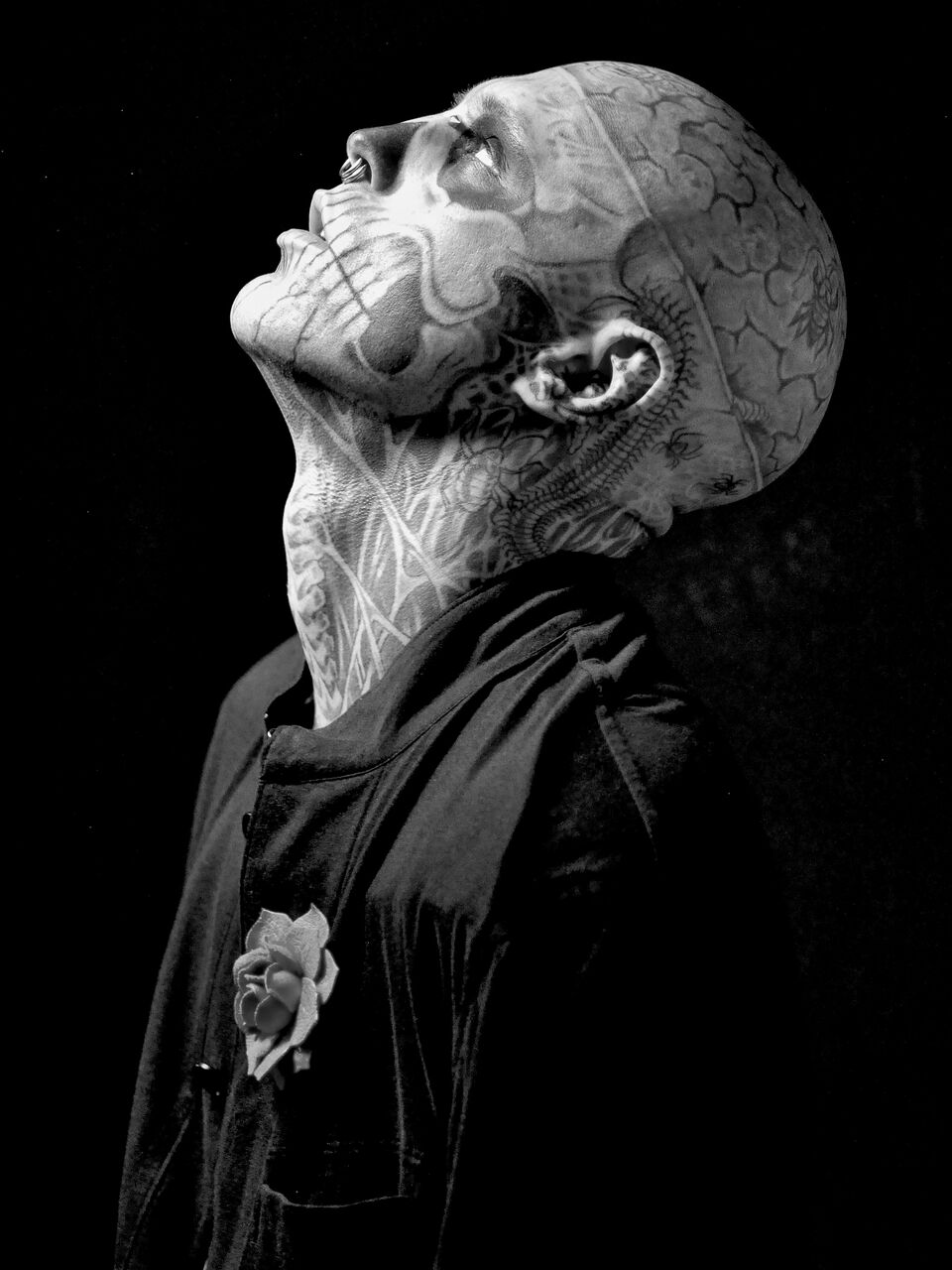
The track "Zombieboy" is a tribute to the late model Rick Genest (pictured).

Track four, "Perfect Celebrity", uses electro-grunge to critique celebrity culture and media perception. "Vanish into You", the fifth track, blends glam rock and experimental pop, with Bowie-inspired choruses and lyrics about surrender. Track six, "Killah", produced by Gesaffelstein, features industrial electro-funk, Nine Inch Nails influences, and femme fatale lyrics. "Zombieboy", the seventh song, is a tribute to Rick Genest, mixing funk and disco with lyrics about excess. Track eight, "LoveDrug", evokes arena rock, while its lyrics reference addiction as a metaphor for love, reflecting themes of emotional pain.

The ninth song, "How Bad Do U Want Me", channels 1980s synth-pop and explores image and desire, referencing the Vince Clarke era of Depeche Mode and Yazoo. The next track, "Don't Call Tonight", returns to funk and europop with talk box effects and lyrics about toxic love. Track eleven, "Shadow of a Man", discusses sexism, particularly in the music and entertainment industry, over a disco-electropop base. Track twelve, "The Beast", plays with duality and desire, featuring a dramatic guitar solo. The penultimate track, "Blade of Grass", is a minimalist ballad inspired by Gaga's fiancé and a symbolic proposal. The album closes with "Die with a Smile", a soulful ballad with Bruno Mars, which centers on unconditional love amid chaos.

Additional tracks released on certain album versions include "The Dead Dance", which combines funky rhythms with 1980s-inspired synths and lyrics about transformation and resilience, "Can't Stop the High", described by Gaga as "pure electro grunge", and "Kill for Love", a dark electropop track that explores themes of desire, danger, and devotion.

== Release ==
During promotion for the musical psychological thriller film Joker: Folie à Deux (2024), in which she portrays the DC Comics character Harley Quinn, Gaga announced that the album's lead single would be released in October 2024, with the album originally set to follow in February the following year. On January 21, 2025, Gaga launched a countdown on her website set to end on January 27. Each day, the website showcased artwork inspired by her previous material, beginning with The Fame (2008) and continuing with The Fame Monster (2009), Born This Way (2011), Artpop (2013), Joanne (2016), Chromatica (2020) and Harlequin (2024). When the countdown ended, the album's title, official cover art, and March 7 release date were revealed. Prior to the official announcement, promotional posters appeared in New York City, featuring a black-and-white photograph of Gaga accompanied by the album's title and release date written in red at the bottom.

On February 17, Gaga updated her website with a new interactive background. Visitors could uncover lyrics from the album that appeared and vanished as the cursor moved across the screen. On February 22, Gaga revealed the official tracklist on social media, confirming that Mayhem would feature 14 tracks in its standard edition, plus two bonus tracks. Mayhem was released worldwide via Interscope Records in CD, digital download, streaming, and vinyl formats. Various limited-edition physical formats were also issued, including vinyl and cassette versions featuring the original cover design. In September, a digital reissue of the album incorporated "The Dead Dance", along with "Can’t Stop the High" and "Kill for Love", the latter two previously exclusive to certain physical editions.

=== Artwork and title ===
The standard edition cover features Gaga with disheveled black hair and her face slightly distorted behind a shattered glass. The back cover maintains the black-and-white scheme, with Mayhem written in a distorted and aggressive font, while Lady Gaga appears below in a more classic typeface, with the first "A" inverted. The photoshoot was overseen by Frank Lebon. In an interview with Elle, Gaga revealed that the album's title corresponds to a character whose presence is felt throughout the album's tracks: Mayhem. In the music videos for "Disease" and "Abracadabra", the character—portrayed by Gaga—appears as a blood-eyed figure driving a car and running over one of her own versions, and later challenges the audience to "dance for their lives". Regarding the choice of title, Gaga revealed that she had initially considered naming the album Perfect Celebrity while exploring an electro-grunge sound, but ultimately decided on a different direction. She stated that the album's title reflects her attempt to confront and accept aspects of herself and of life that she had previously found difficult to face. She further elaborated:

It was hard at first to name the album Mayhem because I so much don't want that feeling to be real. I am also a hopeful person. I'm also somebody that is a dreamer, but what I think I ultimately arrived at is; it's all of the fractures of who we are and the fractures in the world and the mayhem of that brokenness that ultimately teaches us the power of joy, and dancing and crying and laughing and listening to music and holding your friends and your family and repeat! This album is fun and I enjoyed the contrast of a fun album that's also called Mayhem.

== Promotion ==
=== Performances and other appearances ===
On December 15, 2024, Gaga performed "Disease" and "Die with a Smile" during a Christmas special of Carpool Karaoke, released on Apple TV+. Hot Ones, a YouTube series, released an episode featuring an interview with Gaga on February 13, 2025. An appearance on the Vanity Fair "Lie Detector Test" web series followed on February 19. On March 5, in collaboration with ESPN, Gaga revealed a preview of "Garden of Eden", which was selected as the official song for their 2025 Formula One season. Spotify hosted a "Little Monster Press Conference" on March 6, during which Gaga answered questions from her fans. On Saturday Night Live's March 8 episode, Gaga took on "double duty" for the second time in her career, appearing as both the host and musical guest for the night. She performed "Abracadabra" and "Killah" live for the first time. On March 11, she performed acoustic versions of "Abracadabra" and "Perfect Celebrity" live on The Howard Stern Show. On March 13, Gaga and Mastercard hosted Club Mayhem, an exclusive dance party in Los Angeles where the singer joined her fans and dancers.

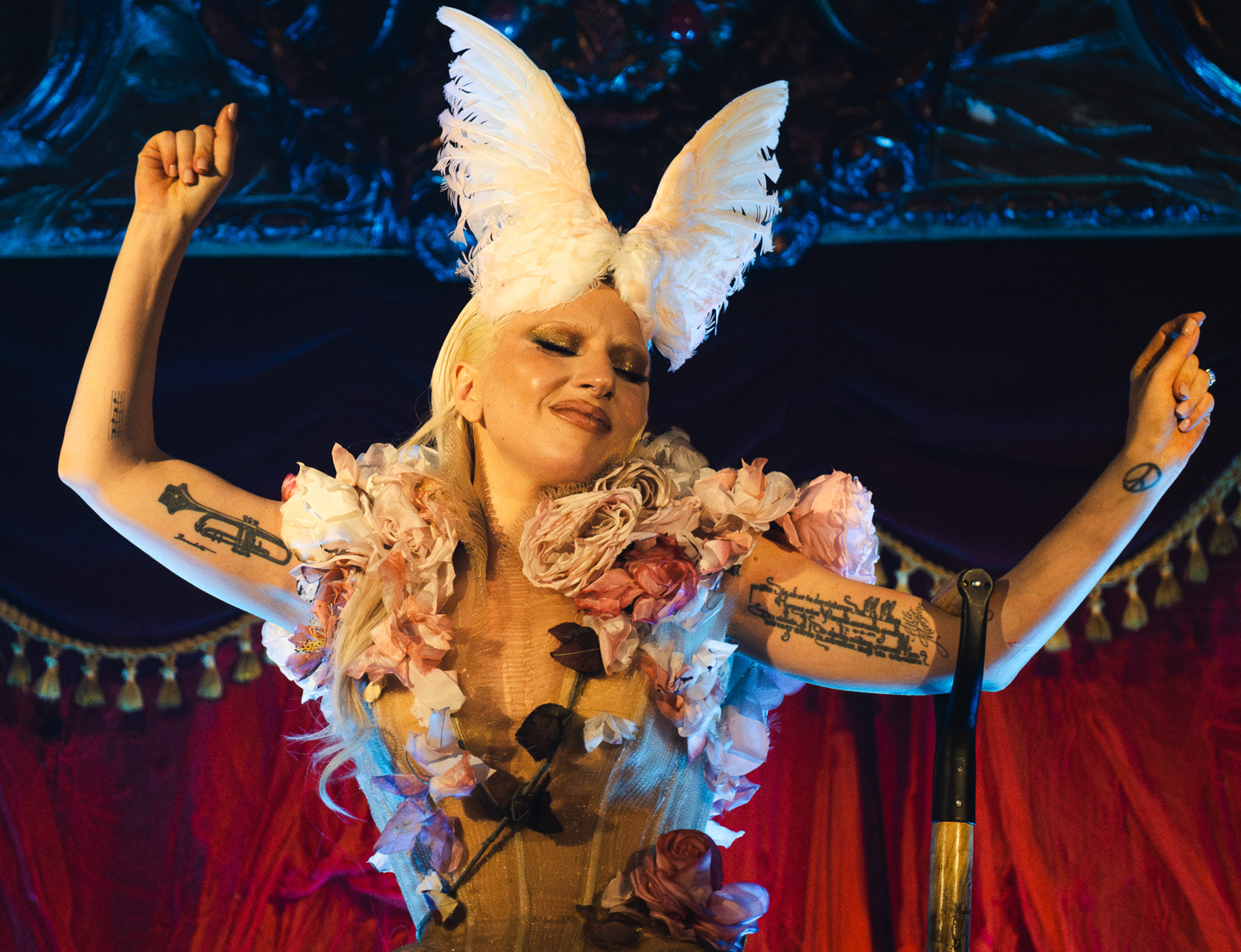
Gaga at a Mayhem-themed Halloween event organized by YouTube at La Paloma in Barcelona, October 2025

On May 13, 2025, Gaga performed "Abracadabra", "Perfect Celebrity", "How Bad Do U Want Me" and "Vanish into You" during a five-song set at the YouTube Brandcast event, held at the Geffen Hall in New York City. On May 31, 2025, she participated in Netflix's Tudum event with a special presentation inspired by Wednesday, emerging from a coffin with the inscription "Here lies the monster queen" to perform "Zombieboy" and "Abracadabra", accompanied by dancers with a gothic aesthetic reminiscent of the Addams Family. In August, Gaga partnered with the multiplayer dress-up video game Dress to Impress, where players were able to take part in Mayhem-themed challenges, exploring Lady Gaga-inspired outfits and items, and also had the chance to encounter her in-game.

Gaga performed "Abracadabra" and "The Dead Dance" at the 2025 MTV Video Music Awards on September 7, in a pre-recorded segment filmed at Madison Square Garden in New York City. (Note: The performance was recorded the day before during The Mayhem Ball tour.) The following day, she sang a stripped-down piano version of "Vanish into You" on The Late Show with Stephen Colbert, which Billboard called "mesmerizing". On October 3, Gaga appeared on KCRW, Santa Monica's radio station, for an interview with Chris Douridas, where she discussed the creation of Mayhem and performed "Abracadabra" and "Vanish into You" on piano. Later that month, she attended a Mayhem-themed Halloween event held in collaboration with YouTube at Barcelona's La Paloma venue, where she wore an outfit inspired by her song "Garden of Eden" and danced to "Abracadabra" and "The Dead Dance".

On February 1, 2026, Gaga delivered a rock rendition of "Abracadabra" at the 68th Annual Grammy Awards. She wore a red feathered outfit, a piece from the Alexander McQueen archives, with her face enclosed in a cage-like contraption called the Horn Of Plenty, featured famously in a 2009 McQueen runway. She played a Minimoog, backed by a live band that included producer Watt on guitar and Nine Inch Nails drummer Josh Freese. On February 8, 2026, she made a guest appearance during Bad Bunny's Super Bowl LX halftime show, where she performed an abridged salsa version of "Die with a Smile", supported by the group Los Sobrinos. The performance took place during a legally binding onstage wedding ceremony involving a couple who had previously invited Bad Bunny to attend their wedding, which formed part of the show's narrative.

=== Singles ===
"Disease" was released as the album's lead single on October 25, 2024. An electropop and dark-pop song, it received positive reviews and reached the top thirty in multiple countries, including the United States and United Kingdom. The accompanying music video, directed by Tanu Muino, was released on October 29, 2024. Two acoustic versions were later released, each with its own performance video: "The Antidote", performed on piano, on November 13, and "The Poison", performed on electric guitar, on November 20. It received a nomination for Best Pop Solo Performance at the 2026 Grammy Awards.

On February 2, 2025, Gaga attended the 67th Annual Grammy Awards and debuted the music video for "Abracadabra" during a commercial break as part of a partnership with Mastercard. The track was released as the second single the following day. The song's dance-pop energy and its music video's theatrical visuals drew comparisons to Gaga's earlier works, and it became the second top ten—and top five entry from Mayhem and of Gaga's career on the Billboard Global 200 chart following "Die with a Smile". On March 29, the video "Abracadabra (Fan Version)" was released, featuring 32 fans selected through a Mastercard contest. It was directed Parris Goebel, who co-directed the earlier music video with Gaga and Bethany Vargas; Goebel also served as choreographer for the "Disease" and "Abracadabra" videos. At the 68th Annual Grammy Awards, "Abracadabra" received four nominations, including Record and Song of the Year, and won Best Dance Pop Recording.

Mayhem also includes "Die with a Smile", released as a standalone single alongside its retro-themed music video on August 16, 2024, and later included on the album. The song received widespread acclaim and commercial success, topping charts in over 30 countries and winning the Grammy Award for Best Pop Duo/Group Performance. On September 3, 2025, Gaga released the single "The Dead Dance" from the soundtrack of the television series Wednesday. Upon release, the song was included on the digital reissue of Mayhem on streaming platforms. Its accompanying music video, directed by Tim Burton and filmed on Mexico's Island of the Dolls, premiered the same day and was praised for its gothic, horror-inspired aesthetic and choreography.

=== Concert series ===
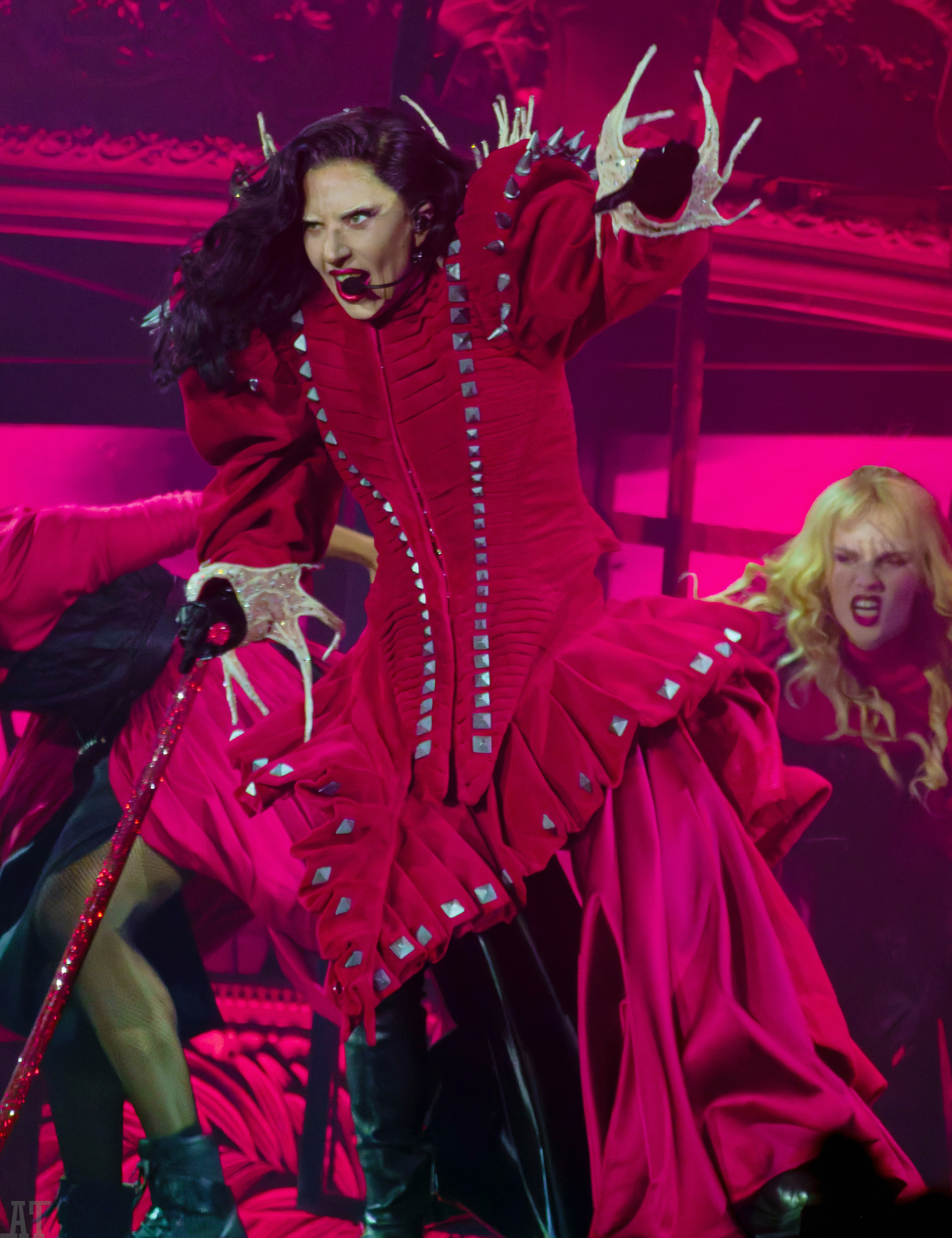
Gaga performing "Abracadabra" during The Mayhem Ball. The tour retained key elements from her earlier promotional shows for the album.

In promotion of Mayhem, Gaga staged a theatrical concert experience titled The Art of Personal Chaos. Produced by Gaga and Michael Polansky and directed by Gaga and Ben Dalgleish of Human Person, with choreography by Parris Goebel, the show blends large-scale staging, narrative storytelling, and couture-driven fashion. Its plot explores themes of duality, death, and rebirth, expanding the operatic and psychological motifs central to Mayhem.

The production debuted during a nine-date promotional run from April 11 to May 24, 2025. This included her second headlining performance at Coachella, a free Copacabana Beach concert in Rio de Janeiro —which drew the largest crowd ever for a female artist—, and stadium dates in Mexico City and Singapore, marking her first appearances in those markets since 2012. The six ticketed dates grossed a combined $56.3 million, with the four Singapore concerts each setting a personal revenue record at $10.2 million, while both Mexico City dates sold out within hours.

On March 26, 2025, Gaga announced her eighth concert tour, the Mayhem Ball, via social media. The tour presents an updated version of The Art of Personal Chaos, keeping its core narrative while revising the setlist and costumes. It launched on July 16, 2025, at the T-Mobile Arena in Paradise, Nevada, and concluded on April 13, 2026, at Madison Square Garden in New York City. Spanning North America, Europe, Oceania, and Asia, it comprises 86 shows. The first North American leg grossed over $103 million from 27 reported dates—her highest total in a single territory—and Billboard projects the tour to exceed $300 million overall. In 2025, the Mayhem Ball was the highest-grossing pop tour by a female artist and the second-highest overall. In total, the tour grossed $362.9 million and sold 1.6 million tickets, becoming the ninth highest-grossing concert tour by a female artist in history.

Both the initial incarnation of the show (Note: Attributed to multiple sources:) and the tour version (Note: Attributed to multiple sources:) were widely acclaimed for Gaga's performance, as well as the production design, costumes, and choreography.

=== Mayhem Requiem ===
On May 14, 2026, Gaga released the concert film and accompanying live album Apple Music Live: Mayhem Requiem. A one-off concert, it was filmed on January 14, 2026, at The Wiltern Theatre in Los Angeles. Tickets were offered via a lottery to fans subscribed to updates on Gaga's official website. During the show, Gaga performed all songs from Mayhem's standard edition in sequence, and presented a darker reinterpretation of the album. The concert film was billed as the culmination of Gaga's Mayhem era, and features the opera house set from the Mayhem Ball, now in ruins. The project received particular praise from critics for its stripped-down presentation, Gaga's creative approach, and the album's reworked arrangements.

== Critical reception ==
Professional ratings
Aggregate scores
Source	Rating
AnyDecentMusic?	7.5/10
Metacritic	84/100
Review scores
Source	Rating
AllMusic	4/5 stars
The Guardian	4/5 stars
The Independent	5/5 stars
The Line of Best Fit	7/10
The London Standard	5/5 stars
MusicOMH	4.5/5 stars
NME	4/5 stars
Pitchfork	8.0/10
Rolling Stone	4/5 stars
Slant Magazine	3/5 stars

Mayhem was met with critical acclaim upon its release, with several critics highlighting it as a return to form for Gaga. According to the review aggregator Metacritic, Mayhem received "universal acclaim" based on a weighted average score of 84 out of 100 from 23 critic scores, which is the highest-rated album of her career. The review aggregator site AnyDecentMusic? compiled 25 reviews and gave the album an average of 7.5 out of 10, based on their assessment of the critical consensus.

Many critics praised Mayhem for its energetic production, mix of genres, and distinctive artistic vision. Rolling Stone's Brittany Spanos rated it four stars, describing the album as "the strongest pop release of the year". Alexis Petridis of The Guardian highlighted its blend of electronic, house, and disco. The Times' Ed Potton described it as "a triumphant return to the pop that originally made her famous". The Daily Telegraph writer Neil McCormick praised Gaga's song structures and hooks, drawing inspiration from Blondie, David Bowie, Madonna, Prince, and Siouxsie and the Banshees, and concluded that "in such bland pop times, it's good to see her parking her tanks back on the dance floor". Variety's Steven J. Horowitz noted the callbacks to her debut album, The Fame (2008), and noted it as being "distinctly Gaga". Billboard's Jason Lipshutz praised it for its mix of "big, bold hooks", noting that the album carries "the same propulsive energy of the Fame Monster era". Rich Juzwiak from Pitchfork rated it 8/10, calling it "a massive attack of good vibes" and a "reminder of why fans fell in love with Gaga". One month after the album was released, Anna Gaca of the same publication included Mayhem among the best of the year so far, describing it as "a maximalist record with analog synths, nods to pop art and campy horror films," ideal for those who had "a formative Andy Warhol phase as a teenager".

Los Angeles Times contributor Mikael Wood praised the production and called it "more melodic, more cohesive, and undeniably more fun" than her recent work. The New York Times's Lindsay Zoladz called it "fully polished" highlighting Gaga's energetic and maximalist approach. The Independent's Helen Brown gave it a five-star review, highlighting Mayhem as a return to her pop sound after a decade of exploring other genres. NME writer Nick Levine noted it as a "great Gaga album because it's just so much fun". Rolling Stone UK's Richard Burn noted Mayhem had "the very DNA that made her previous records The Fame and Born This Way a success". The London Standard writer India Block gave a five-star review, calling it "music to dance to all night" with "dancefloor bangers" up front and "pure 80s synth" later on. Bianca Betancourt from Harper's Bazaar praised Mayhem as "a full-circle reclaiming of Gaga's original sound," citing influences from Bowie, Prince, and Michael Jackson, and calling it "a complete representation of her musical evolution".

MusicOMH's Donovan Livesey gave Mayhem 4.5 out of 5 stars, describing it as "exhilarating" and "her best album in years". The Quietus contributor CJ Thorpe-Tracey described the album as a return to form to her thematic roots. AllMusic's Neil Z. Yeung highlighted the album's industrial influences and fusion of funk and disco, praising Gaga's artistic freedom In a similar vein, Consequence's Mary Siroky called it "a work that balances homage and originality," noting Gaga's ability to channel her influences through her own identity. The Arts Desk's Joe Muggs called Mayhem "a ton of fun" whilst Stereogum contributor Abby Jones felt that she "feels larger-than-life while also coming off as incredibly human" on the album. The A.V. Club's En Lennon deemed it "her strongest work in years" for its cohesion and focused sound. DIY's Ben Tipple rated it 4 out of 5 stars, calling it "perfectly over-the-top and incredibly fun".

In more mixed reviews, The Line of Best Fit's David Cobbald praised its production but found it lacked the promised chaos in the campaign and called it "an inspired album rather than an inspiring one". Clash reviewer Robin Murray praised Mayhem as an "exciting return to dark pop" and highlighted Gaga's "theatrical return" but said that the transition to softer moments were awkward. Slant Magazine's Alexa Camp rated it only three stars noted strong theatricality but called the album "kind of boring" and a "bait and switch that's likely to leave many fans disappointed". In a similar view, Ludovic Hunter-Tilney of the Financial Times described Mayhem as "losing its way" and described the album overall as "routinised, risk-averse and not-at-all chaotic". Vulture reviewer Craig Jenkins felt Gaga second-guessed her musical instincts and lamented the "potential" of the album. Jenkins compared the album to similar pop acts revisiting their old sounds, like Taylor Swift, Katy Perry, and Justin Timberlake. In contrast, Business Insider's Callie Ahlgrim called it "lively and melodic" but viewed the "return to form" narrative as misleading and limiting, criticizing the "avant-garde imagery" marketing hinting a return to Gaga's "provocative pop" but concluding that the album is "not what fans or critics were primed to expect".

=== Year-end lists ===
Mayhem was included in several year-end lists by music critics and publications. (Note: Attributed to multiple sources:) Rolling Stone ranked the album at number 2, noting its ambitious sound and blend of influences. Billboard's Katie Atkinson placed it at number 3, praising its cohesive exploration of themes such as fame, identity and love, and noting its strong critical and commercial impact. Ben Beaumont-Thomas of The Guardian ranked Mayhem at number five and wrote that Gaga "returned to the operatic electroclash that powered her first two albums". Entertainment Weekly's Wesley Stenzel ranked it at number 5 and highlighted its eclectic scope, viewing it as a confident showcase of Gaga's versatility. The New Yorker's Amanda Petrusich placed it at number 11 and emphasized its "tidy synthesis of everything [Gaga] does best". Mikael Wood of the Los Angeles Times ranked it at number 14, citing its bold energy and theatrical focus. Poppy Burton of NME placed the album at number 19, praising its assured return to Gaga's early pop sensibilities, while Time Out's Lewis Corner ranked it at number 22 and noted its varied influences and "fiery pop roots". Consequence's Liz Shannon Miller placed it at number 28, describing it as "dance-pop that's determined to get you on your feet," and Pitchfork listed it among the year's notable pop releases, placing it at number 30. Robin Murray of Clash ranked it at number 32 and wrote that the album reconnects Gaga with a sound and artistic approach that she "deserves to own".

Select rankings of Mayhem
Publication	List	Rank	Ref.
Billboard	The 50 Best Albums of 2025	3	
Business Insider	The Best Albums of 2025	3	
Entertainment Weekly	The 10 Best Albums of 2025	5	
The Guardian	The 50 Best Albums of 2025	5	
Harper's Bazaar	The 12 Best Albums of 2025	10	
The London Standard	Albums of the Year 2025	5	
Los Angeles Times	The 25 Best Albums of 2025	14	
NME	The 50 Best Albums of 2025	19	
Rolling Stone	The 100 Best Albums of 2025	2	
Variety	Steven J. Horowitz's 10 Best Albums of 2025	4	

== Commercial performance ==
Mayhem achieved widespread commercial success, ranking as the ninth best-selling album of 2025 globally according to the International Federation of the Phonographic Industry (IFPI). During its release week, the album debuted at number one in 22 countries. Various reports indicated that the album's vinyl editions "sold out quickly," successfully debuting at number one on vinyl charts in countries such as Australia, the United States, Netherlands, the United Kingdom, Spain and Sweden, among others. Additionally, it was the sixth global best-selling vinyl album of the year with 367,000 units sold, according to the IFPI.

In the United States, Mayhem debuted at number one on the Billboard 200 with 219,000 album-equivalent units sold, becoming Gaga's seventh album to top the chart and recording the biggest week for a female album in 2025, as well as the highest debut by a female artist in over six months. It remained the biggest week for a female album in 2025 until September of that year. Of that total, 136,000 units came from physical sales, allowing it to debut atop the Top Album Sales component chart. According to Forbes, this figure exceeded the combined sales of the ten next bestselling albums in the country that same week. Of those physical copies, 74,000 were vinyl records, marking the biggest vinyl sales week of Gaga's career and earning her the number-one spot on the Top Vinyl Albums chart. Meanwhile, 108 million streams within that total gave her the biggest streaming week of her career and led to a number-one debut on Top Streaming Albums. Mayhem also debuted at number one on the Top Dance Albums chart, becoming her eighth album to reach that position and setting a record by surpassing Louie DeVito as the artist with the most number-one albums in the chart's 24-year history. On June 30, the album was certified platinum by the Recording Industry Association of America (RIAA) after surpassing 1,000,000 units sold. As of July 2025, Mayhem has sold 966,000 album-equivalent units in the United States, including 238,000 pure copies, during the tracking period between January 3 and July 3, 2025. In Canada, the album debuted at number one on the Canadian Albums Chart for the March 22 edition, becoming Gaga's fifth album to reach the top position, and was certified platinum by the Music Canada after selling over 80,000 units in the country. In Argentina, the album debuted at number one during the week of April 7, becoming Gaga's third album to reach the top position.

In the United Kingdom, Mayhem debuted at number one on the UK Albums Chart with 55,577 album-equivalent units, 36,159 of which were physical copies, becoming Gaga's sixth album to reach the top of the chart. According to Music Week, the album outsold the rest of the top five combined, while delivering her highest first week sales in the UK since 2013, when Artpop debuted at number one with consumption of 65,608 units. In its second week on the chart, the album fell three places to number four, selling an additional 12,800 copies. On April 25, the album was certified gold by the British Phonographic Industry (BPI) after surpassing 100,000 units sold. In Germany, the album debuted at number one on the German Albums Chart, becoming her third chart-topper in the country and first in 14 years since Born This Way (2011). In Spain, the album debuted at number one on the Top 100 Álbumes chart by Promusicae, becoming the singer's first album to reach the top of the ranking. In Austria, Belgium (both in Flanders and Wallonia), Croatia, Scotland, Slovakia, Hungary, Ireland, Italy, Poland, Portugal, the Czech Republic, and Switzerland, the album debuted at number one on their respective official charts, while in France and the Netherlands, it reached the second position. Within the Nordic countries, Mayhem debuted at number one in Finland and Norway, while it peaked at number two in Sweden, number three in Denmark and number six in Iceland. In the Baltic states, the album debuted at number three in Lithuania.

In Japan, the album debuted at number fourteen on the Oricon Albums Chart during the week of March 17, 2025. On the Billboard Japan Hot Albums chart, the album debuted at number 81 during the week of March 12, 2025, with three days of tracking due to its release on March 7; it later peaked at number 7 in February 4, 2026. In Australia, the album debuted at number one on the Australian Albums Chart, becoming her fifth chart-topper in the country and her thirteenth album to reach the top 50. It also reached number one in New Zealand, where it became her fifth album to top the Official Top 40 Albums chart.

== Accolades ==
Mayhem received multiple award recognitions throughout 2025 and 2026. At the 68th Annual Grammy Awards, it was nominated for Album of the Year and won Best Pop Vocal Album, marking Gaga's fifth nomination in both categories. It also received a nomination for Best Album at the 2025 MTV Video Music Awards, won Album of the Year at the Las Culturistas Culture Awards, and was nominated for Best International Album at the Los 40 Music Awards.

Organization	Year	Category	Result	Ref.
American Music Awards	2026	Album of the Year	Nominated	
American Music Awards	2026	Best Pop Album	Nominated	
Grammy Awards	2026	Album of the Year	Nominated	
Grammy Awards	2026	Best Pop Vocal Album	Won	
Grindr Unwrapped Awards	2025	Album of the Year	Won	
Hungarian Music Awards	2026	Foreign Modern Pop-Rock Album or Record of the Year	Nominated	
iHeartRadio Music Awards	2026	Dance Album of the Year	Won	
Japan Gold Disc Awards	2026	Album of the Year (Western)	Won	
Japan Gold Disc Awards	2026	Best 3 Albums (Western)	Won	
Las Culturistas Culture Awards	2025	Album of the Year	Won	
Los 40 Music Awards	2025	Best International Album	Nominated	
MTV Video Music Awards	2025	Best Album	Nominated	
Nickelodeon Kids' Choice Awards	2025	Favorite Album	Nominated	
RTHK International Pop Poll Awards	2025	Top English Album	Won	
Žebřík Music Awards	2025	Best International Album	Pending	

== Track listing ==
All tracks are produced by Lady Gaga, Andrew Watt, and Cirkut, except where listed.

Mayhem standard edition track listing
No.	Title	Writer(s)	Producer(s)	Length
1.	"Disease"	Lady Gaga; Andrew Watt; Henry Walter; Michael Polansky		3:49
2.	"Abracadabra"	Gaga; Watt; Walter; Susan Janet Ballion; Peter Edward Clarke; Steven Severin; John McGeoch		3:43
3.	"Garden of Eden"	Gaga; Watt; Walter; Mike Lévy	Gaga; Gesaffelstein; Watt; Cirkut	3:59
4.	"Perfect Celebrity"	Gaga; Watt; Walter; Lévy		3:49
5.	"Vanish into You"	Gaga; Watt; Walter; Polansky		4:04
6.	"Killah" (featuring Gesaffelstein)	Gaga; Watt; Walter; Lévy	Gaga; Gesaffelstein; Watt; Cirkut	3:30
7.	"Zombieboy"	Gaga; Watt; Walter; James Fauntleroy		3:33
8.	"LoveDrug"	Gaga; Watt; Walter; Polansky		3:13
9.	"How Bad Do U Want Me"	Gaga; Polansky; Watt; Walter		3:58
10.	"Don't Call Tonight"	Gaga; Watt; Walter; Polansky		3:45
11.	"Shadow of a Man"	Gaga; Watt; Walter		3:19
12.	"The Beast"	Gaga; Watt; Walter; Polansky		3:54
13.	"Blade of Grass"	Gaga; Watt; Lévy; Polansky	Gaga; Watt; Gesaffelstein	4:17
14.	"Die with a Smile" (with Bruno Mars)	Gaga; Mars; Dernst Emile II; Fauntleroy; Watt	Mars; D'Mile; Gaga; Watt	4:11
Total length:				53:04

Digital reissue edition
No.	Title	Writer(s)	Length
5.	"Can't Stop the High"	Gaga; Watt; Walter	3:31
9.	"The Dead Dance"	Gaga; Watt; Walter	3:48
13.	"Kill for Love"	Gaga; Watt; Walter	4:09
Total length:			64:32

=== Notes ===
- "Abracadabra" contains an interpolation of "Spellbound" (1981), written by Susan Janet Ballion, Peter Edward Clarke, Steven Severin and John McGeoch, as performed by Siouxsie and the Banshees.
- Some physical editions of the standard album include either "Can't Stop the High", (Note: Included as a bonus track on the webstore exclusive CD, various vinyl editions and Japanese edition.) or "Kill for Love" (Note: Included as a bonus track on Target, HMV, JB Hi-Fi exclusive CD and Taiwanese special edition CD.) as a bonus track.
- In editions featuring additional tracks, the tracks are inserted into the existing track sequence, advancing all subsequent entries by one position without omitting any original songs.
- The Apple Music edition includes the music videos for "Disease", "Die with a Smile", "Abracadabra" and "The Dead Dance" at the end of the tracklist.

== Personnel ==
Credits were adapted from Tidal.

=== Musicians ===
- Lady Gaga – lead vocals (all tracks), synth pads (track 1), keyboards (2–12), piano (5, 13, 14), Rhodes (7), synthesizer (11)
- Andrew Watt – electric guitar (all tracks), drums (tracks 1–5, 7–13), bass (1, 2, 4, 5, 7, 10, 11), percussion (1, 4, 5, 7, 8, 10, 11, 13); synthesizer, bass programming (1); keyboards (2–13), drum programming (2), acoustic guitar (4, 8, 13), drum machine (12)
- Cirkut – keyboards, synthesizer (tracks 1–13); drums, programming (1); drum programming (3–13), bass programming (3, 5–12)
- Gesaffelstein – drum programming, keyboards, synthesizer (tracks 6, 7)
- Chad Smith – drums (track 6)
- Bruno Mars – lead vocals, electric guitar (track 14)
- D'Mile – bass, drums (track 14)

=== Technical ===
- Randy Merrill – mastering
- Serban Ghenea – mixing
- Paul LaMalfa – engineering
- Charles Moniz – engineering (track 14)
- Bryce Bordone – additional mixing
- Marco Sonzini – additional engineering
- Tyler Harris – additional engineering
- Tommy Turner – additional engineering (tracks 1, 9, 10)
- Nick Hodges – additional engineering (track 5)
- Alex Resoagli – additional engineering (track 14)

== Charts ==
=== Weekly charts ===
Weekly charts
Chart (2025–2026)	Peak position
Argentine Albums (CAPIF)	1
Australian Albums (ARIA)	1
Austrian Albums (Ö3 Austria)	1
Belgian Albums (Ultratop Flanders)	1
Belgian Albums (Ultratop Wallonia)	1
Canadian Albums (Billboard)	1
Croatian International Albums (HDU)	1
Czech Albums (ČNS IFPI)	1
Danish Albums (Hitlisten)	3
Dutch Albums (Album Top 100)	2
Finnish Albums (Suomen virallinen lista)	1
French Albums (SNEP)	2
German Albums (Offizielle Top 100)	1
Greek Albums (IFPI)	12
Hungarian Albums (MAHASZ)	1
Icelandic Albums (Tónlistinn)	6
Irish Albums (Official Charts)	1
Italian Albums (FIMI)	1
Japanese Albums (Oricon)	14
Japanese Combined Albums (Oricon)	14
Japanese Hot Albums (Billboard Japan)	7
Lithuanian Albums (AGATA)	3
New Zealand Albums (RMNZ)	1
Nigerian Albums (TurnTable)	52
Norwegian Albums (VG-lista)	1
Polish Albums (ZPAV)	1
Portuguese Albums (AFP)	1
Scottish Albums (Official Charts)	1
Slovak Albums (ČNS IFPI)	1
Spanish Albums (PROMUSICAE)	1
Swedish Albums (Sverigetopplistan)	2
Swiss Albums (Schweizer Hitparade)	1
UK Albums (Official Charts)	1
US Billboard 200	1
US Top Dance Albums (Billboard)	1

=== Monthly charts ===
Monthly charts
Chart (2026)	Position
Japanese Albums (Oricon)	30

=== Year-end charts ===
Chart (2025)	Position
Australian Albums (ARIA)	18
Austrian Albums (Ö3 Austria)	27
Belgian Albums (Ultratop Flanders)	30
Belgian Albums (Ultratop Wallonia)	27
Canadian Albums (Billboard)	39
Croatian International Albums (HDU)	24
Dutch Albums (Album Top 100)	30
French Albums (SNEP)	22
German Albums (Offizielle Top 100)	11
Global Albums (IFPI)	9
Hungarian Albums (MAHASZ)	45
Italian Albums (FIMI)	35
Japanese Download Albums (Billboard Japan)	52
New Zealand Albums (RMNZ)	32
Polish Albums (ZPAV)	13
Spanish Albums (PROMUSICAE)	23
Swedish Albums (Sverigetopplistan)	52
Swiss Albums (Schweizer Hitparade)	14
UK Albums (Official Charts)	29
US Billboard 200	30
US Top Dance Albums (Billboard)	2

== Certifications ==
Certifications
Region	Certification	Certified units/sales
Australia (ARIA)	Gold	35,000^{‡}
Belgium (BRMA)	2× Platinum	40,000^{‡}
Brazil (Pro-Música Brasil)	Platinum	40,000^{‡}
Canada (Music Canada)	Platinum	80,000^{‡}
France (SNEP)	Platinum	100,000^{‡}
Germany (BVMI)	Gold	75,000^{‡}
Italy (FIMI)	Platinum	50,000^{‡}
New Zealand (RMNZ)	Platinum	15,000^{‡}
Poland (ZPAV)	2× Platinum	60,000^{‡}
Portugal (AFP)	Gold	3,500^{‡}
Spain (Promusicae)	Gold	20,000^{‡}
Sweden (GLF)	Gold	15,000^{‡}
Switzerland (IFPI Switzerland)	Platinum	20,000^{‡}
United Kingdom (BPI)	Gold	100,000^{‡}
United States (RIAA)	Platinum	1,000,000^{‡}
Streaming
Central America (CFC)	Gold	3,500,000^{†}
^{‡} Sales+streaming figures based on certification alone.^{†} Streaming-only figures based on certification alone.

== Release history ==
Release dates and formats for Mayhem
Region	Date	Format(s)	Edition(s)	Label	Ref.
Various	March 7, 2025	Cassette; CD; digital download; streaming; vinyl	Standard	Interscope	
Various	September 3, 2025	Digital download; streaming	Digital reissue	Interscope	
