= Grindr Unwrapped =

Annual report by Grindr

Grindr Unwrapped is an annual report released by the gay dating app Grindr. It provides user statistics like top "gaycation" cities and percentage of "daddies" by country, as well as polling statistics on the most popular television shows, musicians, "Daddy of the Year," and other categories voted upon by users. It has been noted to reveal notable shifts in identity, preference and pop culture sentiment.

== Methodology ==
At the end of each year, Grindr pulls statistics from its user base of over 15 million monthly users (as of 2025), as well as tens of thousands of votes from its polls surrounding pop culture. According to senior vice president of brand marketing and communications Tristan Pineiro, "It's our way of celebrating the voices and moments that make our community so vibrant and swoon-worthy while honoring the trends and perspectives that unite us globally."

User statistics include but are not limited to most searched profile tags, most favorited zodiac signs, countries with the highest percentage of open relationships, top cities for looking for friends, and most popular songs listed on profiles.

Polling statistics include but are not limited to mother of the year, ally of the year, album of the year, tour of the year, and song of the year.

== The 2024 Gay Year in Review ==
The 2024 edition was released in December, presenting an annual overview of global user activity, dating behaviors, and popular culture trends. The report combined anonymous, aggregated data from Grindr's worldwide user base with a community survey involving more than 10,000 respondents.

=== Community awards ===
==== Celebrities and personalities ====
Mother of the Year: 1. Charli XCX; 2. Lady Gaga; 3. Beyoncé; 4. Celine Dion; 5. Chappell Roan	Ally of the Year: 1. Charli XCX; 2. Pedro Pascal; 3. Jamie Lee Curtis; 4. David Tennant; 5. Sade
Gay Power Couple of the Year: 1. Holland Taylor and Sarah Paulson; 2. Matt Bomer and Simon Halls; 3. Sam Smith and Christian Cowan; 4. Ben Platt and Noah Galvin; 5. Zane Phillips and Froy Gutierrez	Hottest Man of the Year: 1. Pedro Pascal; 2. Jonathan Bailey; 3. Bad Bunny; 4. Travis Kelce; 5. Jeremy Allen White
Babygirl of the Year: 1. Troye Sivan; 2. Shawn Mendes; 3. Jacob Elordi; 4. Lil Nas X; 5. Challengers	Porn Star of the Year: 1. Tyler Wu; 2. Rhyheim Shabazz; 3. Girthmaster; 4. Dan Benson; 5. Kyle Krieger

==== Music ====
Album of the Year: 1. Brat – Charli XCX; 2. Hit Me Hard and Soft – Billie Eilish; 3. Cowboy Carter – Beyoncé; 4. Eternal Sunshine – Ariana Grande; 5. Short n' Sweet – Sabrina Carpenter	Song of the Year: 1. "Good Luck, Babe!" – Chappell Roan; 2. "Espresso" – Sabrina Carpenter; 3. "We Can't Be Friends (Wait for Your Love)" – Ariana Grande; 4. "Birds of a Feather" – Billie Eilish; 5. "360" – Charli XCX
Tour of the Year: 1. Sweat – Charli XCX and Troye Sivan; 2. The Eras Tour – Taylor Swift; 3. The Celebration Tour – Madonna; 4. Short n' Sweet Tour – Sabrina Carpenter; 5. Hit Me Hard and Soft: The Tour – Billie Eilish	

==== Film, television and podcasts ====
Favorite Movie of the Year: 1. Deadpool & Wolverine; 2. Inside Out 2; 3. The Substance; 4. Challengers; 5. Dune: Part Two	TV Show of the Year: 1. Baby Reindeer; 2. The Boyfriend; 3. The Bear; 4. English Teacher; 5. Pop Star Academy: Katseye
Hate Watch of the Year: 1. Emily in Paris; 2. Love Is Blind; 3. 90 Day Fiancé; 4. The Morning Show; 5. Selling Sunset	Greatest Podcast of the Year: 1. The Bald and the Beautiful – Trixie Mattel and Katya Zamolodchikova; 2. Who's the Asshole? – Katya Zamolodchikova; 3. Las Culturistas – Bowen Yang and Matt Rogers; 4. So True – Caleb Hearon; 5. Emergency Intercom – Drew Phillips and Enya Umanzor

==== Internet culture and viral moments ====
Best Read of the Year: 1. "Bleach blonde bad built butch body"; 2. "Hiss" – Megan Thee Stallion; 3. "Not Like Us" – Kendrick Lamar and Drake; 4. Plane Jane's RuPaul's Drag Race dialogue; 5. Simone Biles' Olympics clapback	Gay Gasp of the Year: 1. French Olympic pole vaulter; 2. Madonna's free concert in Rio de Janeiro; 3. Lorde and Charli XCX at Madison Square Garden; 4. Cooper Koch's "It's Not a Prosthetic" revelation; 5. Gypsy-Rose Blanchard's pregnancy announcement
Best Viral Newcummer of the Year: 1. Jools Lebron; 2. Queen of Melrose; 3. Nara Smith; 4. Fr00dle; 5. Kelley Heyer	

==== Gaming ====
Gayme of the Year: 1. Dress to Impress; 2. The Last of Us Part II Remastered; 3. Baldur's Gate 3; 4. Dead by Daylight; 5. Final Fantasy VII Rebirth	Gaymer of the Year: 1. Ludwig; 2. Upuntildawnn; 3. Farrahrized; 4. Hazlanz; 5. Devoglaer

=== User statistics ===
==== Platform activity ====
Metric	Total
Chats sent	130 billion
Taps sent	10 billion
Private albums shared	2 billion

==== Sexual preferences and identities ====
Highest Percentage of Tops: 1. Jordan; 2. Greece; 3. United States; 4. Singapore; 5. Peru	Highest Percentage of Bottoms: 1. South Africa; 2. South Korea; 3. Japan; 4. Vietnam; 5. Denmark
Highest Percentage of Vers: 1. Finland; 2. Austria; 3. Germany; 4. Australia; 5. Hungary	Highest Percentage of Side: 1. Singapore; 2. Philippines; 3. Japan; 4. New Zealand; 5. Australia
Highest Percentage of Feet Lovers: 1. Italy; 2. Germany; 3. United Kingdom; 4. France; 5. Israel	Highest Percentage of Bears: 1. Greece; 2. United States; 3. Ireland; 4. Trinidad and Tobago; 5. South Africa
Highest Percentage of Twinks: 1. Netherlands; 2. Switzerland; 3. Belgium; 4. United Kingdom; 5. Brazil	Highest Percentage of Daddies: 1. United States; 2. Australia; 3. Trinidad and Tobago; 4. Venezuela; 5. Canada
Highest Percentage of Hung Bottoms: 1. France; 2. Canada; 3. Germany; 4. Brazil; 5. Switzerland	Highest Percentage of Fem Tops: 1. United Kingdom; 2. Ireland; 3. United States; 4. Australia; 5. Mexico
Top Countries Who Love Nudes: 1. United States; 2. Finland; 3. Australia; 4. Canada; 5. Norway	Sex Position of the Year: 1. Missionary; 2. Backshots; 3. 69; 4. Side; 5. Spooning
Favorite Foreplay Activity: 1. Kissing; 2. Oral; 3. Rimming; 4. Hand stuff; 5. Frotting	

==== Dating and relationships ====
Most Popular Tags Displayed: 1. Discreet; 2. Bi; 3. FWB; 4. Kissing; 5. Oral	Most Popular Tags Searched: 1. Hung; 2. Trans; 3. BB; 4. Dom; 5. Feet
Highest Percentage of Open Relationships: 1. South Korea; 2. Switzerland; 3. Germany; 4. Netherlands; 5. Denmark	Top Countries Who Don't Swap Nudes: 1. South Africa; 2. India; 3. Italy; 4. Cambodia; 5. Jordan

==== Cities and travel ====
Most Roamed To Destination: 1. New York City, United States; 2. London, United Kingdom; 3. Paris, France; 4. Miami, United States; 5. Los Angeles, United States	Gayest Gayborhood of the Year: 1. Soho, London; 2. Chueca, Madrid; 3. West Hollywood, Los Angeles; 4. The Castro, San Francisco; 5. Le Marais, Paris

== The 2025 Gay Year in Review ==
The fifth edition of Grindr Unwrapped was released on December 4, 2025. The report combined anonymous, aggregated platform data from Grindr's more than 15 million monthly active users with over 32,000 community votes, three times the number recorded in the previous year. New categories introduced in 2025 included Mother in Training, Press Tour of the Year, and Best Wig.

It received a bronze honor for microsite at the 18th annual Shorty Awards ceremony which took place on May 19, 2026, in New York City.

=== Community awards ===
==== Celebrities and personalities ====
Mother of the Year: 1. Lady Gaga; 2. Ariana Grande; 3. Beyoncé; 4. Taylor Swift; 5. Chappell Roan	Daddy of the Year: 1. Pedro Pascal; 2. Henry Cavill; 3. Ricky Martin; 4. Tom Hardy; 5. David Beckham
Doll of the Year: 1. Jinkx Monsoon; 2. Vivian Wilson; 3. Alex Consani; 4. Hunter Schafer; 5. Kim Petras	Mother in Training: 1. Sabrina Carpenter; 2. Doechii; 3. Addison Rae; 4. Tate McRae; 5. Raye
Hottest Man of the Year: 1. Jonathan Bailey; 2. Bad Bunny; 3. David Corenswet; 4. Michael B. Jordan; 5. Jung Kook	Comeback Queen: 1. Kesha; 2. Lindsay Lohan; 3. TikTok; 4. Demi Lovato; 5. Pamela Anderson
Housewife of the Year: 1. Angie Katsanevas; 2. Porsha Williams; 3. Phaedra Parks; 4. Katie Ginella; 5. Dorit Kemsley	Pornstar of the Year: 1. Joey Mills; 2. Rhyheim Shabazz; 3. Girthmasterr; 4. Diego Barros; 5. Tyler Wu
Comedian of the Year: 1. Caleb Hearon; 2. Matteo Lane; 3. Benito Skinner; 4. Bowen Yang; 5. Cole Escola	Gaymer of the Year: 1. Dan and Phil; 2. Hazlanz; 3. The Austin Show; 4. Nicki Miraje; 5. Juno Birch

==== Music ====
Album of the Year: 1. Mayhem – Lady Gaga; 2. Man's Best Friend – Sabrina Carpenter; 3. The Life of a Showgirl – Taylor Swift; 4. Debí Tirar Más Fotos – Bad Bunny; 5. Am I the Drama? – Cardi B	Song of the Year: 1. "Abracadabra" – Lady Gaga; 2. "Golden" – Huntr/x; 3. "The Fate of Ophelia" – Taylor Swift; 4. "Anxiety" – Doechii; 5. "Manchild" – Sabrina Carpenter
Gay Guy Music Video of the Year: 1. "Abracadabra" – Lady Gaga; 2. "Tears" – Sabrina Carpenter; 3. "Gabriela" – Katseye; 4. "The Fate of Ophelia" – Taylor Swift; 5. "Anxiety" – Doechii	Girl Group of the Year: 1. Katseye; 2. Huntr/x; 3. Blackpink; 4. Fifth Harmony; 5. Flo
Tour of the Year: 1. The Mayhem Ball – Lady Gaga; 2. Cowboy Carter Tour – Beyoncé; 3. Short n' Sweet Tour – Sabrina Carpenter; 4. Radical Optimism Tour – Dua Lipa; 5. Las Mujeres Ya No Lloran World Tour – Shakira	

==== Film, television and podcast ====
Show of the Year: 1. Overcompensating; 2. The White Lotus; 3. Severance; 4. Too Much; 5. Adults	Movie of the Year: 1. KPop Demon Hunters; 2. Sinners; 3. Weapons; 4. Freakier Friday; 5. Materialists
Hate Watch of the Year: 1. Love Island; 2. The Summer I Turned Pretty; 3. And Just Like That...; 4. The Secret Lives of Mormon Wives; 5. The Sex Lives of College Girls	Press Tour of the Year: 1. Wednesday; 2. One of Them Days; 3. Freakier Friday; 4. Superman; 5. Materialists
Podcast of the Year: 1. The Bald and the Beautiful – Trixie Mattel and Katya Zamolodchikova; 2. Who's the Asshole? – Katya Zamolodchikova; 3. Baby, This Is Keke Palmer – Keke Palmer; 4. Las Culturistas – Bowen Yang and Matt Rogers; 5. Good Hang – Amy Poehler	

==== Internet culture and viral moments ====
Gay Dictionary (The phrase on everyone's lips): 1. "Delulu"; 2. "Clock it"; 3. "Ate"; 4. "Crash out"; 5. "Turning 19 in Poland"	Viral Soundbite of the Year: 1. "Nothing beats a Jet2 holiday"; 2. "Party 4 U"; 3. "Daddy's home"; 4. "My name is Pink..."; 5. "What the helly?"
Gay Gasp: 1. Beyoncé winning Album of the Year.; 2. Cardi B testifying in court.; 3. The CEO scandal at the Coldplay concert.; 4. Lady Gaga's concert in Rio de Janeiro.; 5. Pee-wee Herman comes out as gay.	Best Beef: 1. Cardi B vs. Nicki Minaj; 2. Taylor Swift vs. Charli XCX; 3. Jinkx Monsoon vs. J. K. Rowling; 4. Lana Del Rey vs. Ethel Cain; 5. Arianators vs. Ticketmaster

==== Fashion and trends ====
Best Wig: 1. Cardi B's court appearances; 2. Chappell Roan in the "The Subway" music video; 3. Sabrina Carpenter on the Short n' Sweet Tour; 4. Nicole Kidman in Babygirl; 5. Ibiza Final Boss	Gayest Fashion Trend: 1. Slutty little glasses; 2. Cowboy hat & chaps; 3. Masc skirts; 4. White ribbed tank; 5. Sunglasses indoors
2025 Trends We're Leaving: 1. Labubu; 2. Dubai chocolate; 3. Matcha; 4. Over-the-Knee Shorts; 5. Mustaches	Bulge of the Year: 1. Bad Bunny; 2. Jonathan Bailey; 3. David Corenswet; 4. Austin Butler; 5. Parker Posey's concealed pill bottle in The White Lotus

=== User statistics ===
==== Platform activity ====
Metric	Total
Albums shared	3.3+ billion
Chats sent	135+ billion
Taps sent	12.8 billion

==== Sexual preferences and identities ====
Most Bears: 1. Ireland; 2. United States; 3. Greece; 4. South Africa; 5. United Kingdom	Highest Percentage of Twinks: 1. Switzerland; 2. Netherlands; 3. Belgium; 4. Austria; 5. Germany
Bottom Hotspots: 1. South Africa; 2. South Korea; 3. Japan; 4. Vietnam; 5. Finland	Highest Percentage of Vers: 1. Finland; 2. Germany; 3. Austria; 4. Hungary; 5. Australia
Side Hotspots: 1. Singapore; 2. Philippines; 3. Japan; 4. New Zealand; 5. Australia	Hung Bottoms: 1. France; 2. United Kingdom; 3. Canada; 4. United States; 5. Australia
Fem Top Hotspots: 1. United Kingdom; 2. Ireland; 3. United States; 4. Slovenia; 5. Australia	Biggest Top Shortage: 1. Vietnam; 2. Thailand; 3. Poland; 4. Mexico; 5. France
Most Into Feet: 1. Italy; 2. Germany; 3. United Kingdom; 4. France; 5. Greece	

==== Dating and relationships ====
Most Open Relationships: 1. South Korea; 2. Switzerland; 3. Germany; 4. Netherlands; 5. Denmark	Fastest Repliers: 1. India; 2. Philippines; 3. Spain; 4. Italy; 5. Chile
Top Countries Using "Right Now": 1. Malta; 2. Singapore; 3. Portugal; 4. Albania; 5. Italy	

==== Cities and travel ====
Most Favorited Cities: 1. Taipei, Taiwan; 2. Berlin, Germany; 3. London, England; 4. Mexico City, Mexico; 5. Montreal, Canada	Top Cities Looking For: 1. Tokyo, Japan; 2. Seattle, Washington; 3. Taipei, Taiwan; 4. San Diego, California; 5. Minneapolis, Minnesota
Daddy Capitals of the World: 1. United States; 2. Australia; 3. United Kingdom; 4. New Zealand; 5. Canada	Cities Sending the Most Pixxxs: 1. Medellín, Colombia; 2. Milan, Italy; 3. Athens, Greece; 4. Bangalore, India; 5. Manaus, Brazil
Favorite Gaycations: 1. London; 2. Paris; 3. New York City; 4. Berlin; 5. Barcelona	Top Cities to Roam To: 1. London, England; 2. New York City, United States; 3. Paris, France; 4. Chicago, Illinois; 5. Rio de Janeiro, Brazil

==== Zodiac signs ====
Most Favorited Zodiacs of the Year: 1. Scorpio; 2. Leo; 3. Sagittarius; 4. Taurus; 5. Virgo	Zodiacs Most Likely to Sext: 1. Leo; 2. Scorpio; 3. Virgo; 4. Taurus; 5. Sagittarius
Signs Most Into BDSM: 1. Aquarius; 2. Capricorn; 3. Cancer; 4. Aries; 5. Gemini	

== The 2026 Gay Year in Review ==
The nominations for the 2026 edition of the Grindr Unwrapped community awards were announced on October 17, 2026. New categories introduced this year include "Grindr Girl" of the Year, Streamer of the Year, Butt of the Year, and Best Festival Set of the Year.

=== Community awards ===
==== Celebrities and personalities ====
Mother of the Year: Anne Hathaway; Ariana Grande; Hilary Duff; Keke Palmer; Madonna; Megan Thee Stallion; Nicole Kidman; Rosalía; Shakira; Zendaya	Mother in Training: Adéla; Alysa Liu; Inde Navarrette; Olivia Dean; Olivia Rodrigo; PinkPantheress; Rebecca Black; Slayyyter; Tyla; Zara Larsson
"Grindr Girl" of the Year: Addison Rae; Carly Rae Jepsen; Mary Beth Barone; Meg Stalter; PinkPantheress; Rachel Sennott; Raye; Slayyyter; Vanilla Mace; Zara Larsson	Daddy of the Year: Alexander Skarsgård; Antonio Banderas; Colman Domingo; Damson Idris; Lee Pace; Matt Damon; Matthew McConaughey; Paul Downs; Ryan Gosling; Theo James
Hottest Man of the Year: Aaron Pierre; Callum Turner; Carl Schmidt; Connor Storrie; François Arnaud; Hudson Williams; Manny Jacinto; Robert Pattinson; Role Model; Tom Holland	Doll of the Year: Hunter Schafer; Essence Thomas; Kim Petras; Alex Consani; Sasha Colby; Munroe Bergdorf; Josie Totah; Eli; Emira D'Spain; Detox
Housewife of the Year: Lisa Barlow; Gizelle Bryant; Porsha Williams; Heather Dubrow; Teresa Giudice; Vicki Gunvalson; Dorit Kemsley; Liz McGraw; Bronwyn Newport; Jennifer Tilly	Comedian of the Year: Mary Beth Barone; Ziwe Fumudoh; Marcello Hernández; Saeri Jane; Evan Mulrooney; Grace Reiter; Rachel Sennott; Meg Stalter; Ivy Wolk; Bowen Yang
Streamer of the Year: Dallycatxo; Doja Cat; Ella Ivy; Flexing Thumbs; Hazlanz; Jenn McAllister; Jimmy Whetze; Juice Boxx; Vanilla Mace; YourFriend Kevin	Porn Star of the Year: Diego Sans; Horsepapo; Internet Papi; Jkab Ethan Dale; Jonah Wheeler; Noah Way; Rocky Heron; Roxas Caelum; Sean Ford; Tonedstoner

==== Music ====
Album of the Year: Prima – Adéla; Petal – Ariana Grande; Music, Fashion, Film – Charli XCX; No Me Arrepiento de Sentir Tanto – Karol G; Confessions II – Madonna; You Seem Pretty Sad for a Girl So in Love – Olivia Rodrigo; Sexistential – Robyn; Worst Girl in America – Slayyyter; Popstar – Tinashe; She's the Best – Troye Sivan	Song of the Year: "Nicole Kidman" – Adéla; "Rock Music" – Charli XCX; "Pinky Up" – Katseye; "Jeep" – Kim Petras; "Bring Your Love" – Madonna and Sabrina Carpenter; "The Cure" – Olivia Rodrigo; "Sexistential" – Robyn; "Brand New Chanels" – Slayyyter; "Too Easy" – Tinashe; "Party" – Troye Sivan
Music Video of the Year: "Hate That I Made You Love Me" – Ariana Grande; "Camera" – Charli XCX; "Rock Music" – Charli XCX; "Hootie Frutti" – Katseye; "Runway" – Lady Gaga and Doechii; "Iconic by Mistake" – Le Sserafim, Illit and Katseye; Confessions II – The Film – Madonna; "The Cure" – Olivia Rodrigo; "Stateside" – PinkPantheress and Zara Larsson; "Dance..." – Slayyyter	Best Festival Set of the Year: Addison Rae – Coachella; Chappell Roan – Daisy Chain Fields; Doechii – Daisy Chain Fields; Justin Bieber – Coachella; Ninajirachi – Coachella; Olivia Rodrigo – Daisy Chain Fields; Sabrina Carpenter – Coachella; Slayyyter – Coachella; Tate McRae – Lollapalooza; Zara Larsson – Pukkelpop

==== Film, television and podcasts ====
Movie of the Year: Backrooms; The Devil Wears Prada 2; The Drama; The Invite; Obsession; The Odyssey; Primetime; Project Hail Mary; Spider-Man: Brand New Day; Stop! That! Train!	Show of the Year: Adults; Euphoria; Hacks; Heated Rivalry; House of the Dragon; I Love LA; Love Island USA; Survivor S50; The Traitors; Widow's Bay
Podcast of the Year: Race Chaser – Alaska and Willam; So True – Caleb Hearon; Baby, This Is Keke Palmer – Keke Palmer; Just Trish – Trisha Paytas; Nicky at Night – Nicky Reardon; Ride – Benito Skinner and Mary Beth Barone; In Your Dreams – Owen Thiele; Emergency Intercom – Enya Umanzor and Drew Phillips; Very Delta – Delta Work; Who's the Asshole? – Katya

==== Internet culture and viral moments ====
Biggest Gay Gasp
- Ariana Grande "finding her way back" to Ricky
- Bad Bunny Super Bowl LX Halftime Show
- Emma Chamberlain's Met Gala look
- Harry Styles and Ben Marshall SNL Kiss
- Kacey Musgraves singing from Disco Balls during Tour
- Manon's Katseye Hiatus
- Meg Stalter Painted in Gold at the Emmy Awards
- Olivia Rodrigo's Dress Unraveling During "The Cure"
- Taylor Swift and Travis Kelce Wedding
- Tinashe Scores a 9.0 on Pitchfork

==== Fashion and trends ====
Bulge of the Year: Antoni Porowski; Connor Storrie; Erling Haaland; Henry Cavill; Hudson Williams; Jude Bellingham; Paul Downs; Raphinha; Taylor Zakhar Perez; Tom Holland	Butt of the Year: Carlos Alcaraz; Connor Storrie; Isaac Powell; Jack Innanen; Malik Elassal; Michael Johnston; The Odyssey Deer Man; Orville Peck; Tom Holland; The Butt in the "Party" MV, Peter Seggio
Best Wig: Bad Bunny at the 2026 Met Gala; Sabrina Carpenter for Perfect Magazine; Kylie Jenner for Who What Wear; Katseye go Blonde for "Pinky Up"; Madonna at the 2026 Met Gala; The Marys of Oh Mary!; Robert Pattinson for Interview Magazine; Chappell Roan at Daisy Chain Fields; Meg Stalter at the 2026 American Music Awards; Teyana Taylor's Headpiece at the 2026 Met Gala
