= Juju (Siouxsie and the Banshees album) =

Studio album by Siouxsie and the Banshees
- Released: 19 June 1981
- Recorded: March 1981
- Studios: Surrey Sound, Leatherhead, Surrey
- Genres: Post-punk; gothic rock
- Length: 41:06
- Label: Polydor
- Producers: Nigel Gray; Siouxsie and the Banshees

Siouxsie and the Banshees chronology
Kaleidoscope (1980)	Juju (1981)	A Kiss in the Dreamhouse (1982)

Siouxsie Sioux chronology
Kaleidoscope (1980)	Juju (1981)	Wild Things; The Creatures (1981)

Singles from Juju
- 1. "Spellbound" Released: 22 May 1981; 2. "Arabian Knights" Released: 24 July 1981

Juju is the fourth studio album by the British rock band Siouxsie and the Banshees. It was recorded at Surrey Sound studio with Nigel Gray as co-producer, and was released on 19 June 1981 by Polydor Records. Two singles were released from Juju: "Spellbound" and "Arabian Knights".

The album was commercially successful in the UK. It was acclaimed by critics upon its release, with praise given particularly to John McGeoch's unconventional guitar playing and Siouxsie's vocal performances. It remains a critical favourite and is seen as a landmark album of post-punk.

== Background ==
After the slightly electronic bent of their previous album, 1980's Kaleidoscope, Siouxsie and the Banshees returned to a guitar-based sound for Juju, due to the presence of now-official guitarist McGeoch. The album also prominently featured the intricate percussion work of band member Budgie. According to Steven Severin: "Juju was the first time we'd made a "concept" album that drew on darker elements. It wasn't pre-planned, but, as we were writing, we saw a definite thread running through the songs; almost a narrative to the album as a whole".

The album was recorded at co-producer Gray's Surrey Sound studio. There, McGeoch experimented with a rarely used guitar effects device called the Gizmo for the album track "Into the Light". Attached to the guitar's bridge, the Gizmo used keyed wheels to press the strings, giving a McGeoch's guitar the sound of a classical string instrument. For "Arabian Knights", McGeoch transformed a tune by Siouxsie, initially in waltz rhythm, that she had composed on a Vox Teardrop guitar. For "Sin in My Heart", McGeoch used an EBow while playing guitar.

The sleeve reproduced a picture of an African statue that the group found at the Horniman Museum in Forest Hill.

== Musical style ==
Juju is a post-punk album, and was listed solely as such by AllMusic. The record was also qualified as "art rock" by The Guardian, which also dubbed the two singles as "pop marvels". However, Juju has also been cited by certain critics as gothic rock, though the band dispute such categorisation. BBC Radio 4 called the album "hugely influential dark wave".

== Release ==
Juju reached No. 7 in the UK Albums Chart, remaining in the chart for 17 weeks.

A 180g vinyl reissue of the album, remastered from the original ¼” tapes and cut half-speed at Abbey Road Studios by Miles Showell, was released in August 2018.

== Critical reception ==
Professional ratings
Review scores
Source	Rating
AllMusic	4/5 stars
Sounds	4.5/5 stars

Sounds praised the album, observing that Siouxsie's voice "seems to have acquired a new fullness of melody" with "a rich, dark smoothness". Assessing the band's music, writer Betty Page commented: "The way this unit operates is impressively cohesive, like one brain the inventive musical talents of [guitarist] McGeoch, [drummer] Budgie and [bassist] Severin mesh perfectly with Siouxsie". She also hailed McGeoch as being "the only man who can make an acoustic guitar sound foreboding". NME considered that "Juju, their fourth LP [might be] their second best", qualifying it as "a peak in entertainment". Critic Paul Morley wrote that Siouxsie "exult[ed] with priceless poise". He concluded, naming all the songs, saying: "Side one's highlights – 'Spellbound', 'Into the Light', 'Arabian Knights', 'Halloween' and 'Monitor'. The most consistent side since The Scream. Side two's highlights – 'Night Shift', 'Sin in My Heart', 'Head Cut' and 'Voodoo Dolly'. Juju is the first integrated and sparkling-complete Banshees since The Scream."

In a retrospective review, AllMusic wrote, "The upfront intensity of Juju probably isn't matched anywhere else in the catalog of Siouxsie and the Banshees. Thanks to its killer singles, unrelenting force and invigorating dynamics, Juju is a post-punk classic." The 2004 edition of The Rolling Stone Album Guide, gave a 3 ouf 5 rating while pairing Juju with Kaleidoscope as albums that, refined "the Banshees' attack, diversifying the sound without losing its swirling impact". Rating the album three out of five in the MusicHound album guide book, Doug Pullen described Juju as "a dark sensual record that combined Sioux's pained lyrics with smartly evocative grooves". Music critic Garry Mulholland included Juju in his list of the 261 greatest albums since punk and disco in the book Fear of Music (2006).

In 2007, The Guardian placed Juju on its "1000 Albums to Hear Before You Die" list, writing, "Perennial masters of brooding suspense, the Banshees honed their trademark aloof art rock to its hardest and darkest pitch on Juju." Juju was also featured in the book 1001 Albums You Must Hear Before You Die.

== Legacy ==
In 1995, Melody Maker writer Cathi Unsworth described Juju as "one of the most influential British albums ever".

McGeoch's guitar playing in particular was singled out for praise by critics and musicians. In 2006 he was listed at number 89 on Mojo's list of the "100 greatest guitarists of all time" for his work on "Spellbound". Johnny Marr of the Smiths said on BBC Radio 2 in February 2008 that he rated McGeoch highly for his work on "Spellbound". Marr qualified it as "clever", with a "really good picky thing going on which is very un-rock'n'roll". In Uncut, Marr rated McGeoch as his 10th favourite guitarist for his work on Juju and Real Life by Magazine. Another member of the Smiths, singer Morrissey, commented on "Spellbound" during an interview for the US KROQ-FM radio station in 1997: "Another great single. A hit in England. Certainly not here, I don't think. But they were one of the great groups of the late '70s, early '80s. ... Siouxsie and the Banshees were excellent." Morrissey later named Juju as a major album of the Banshees. Robert Smith of the Cure cited McGeoch's contribution on "Head Cut" in his five favourite guitar tracks, saying: "This is really harsh funk in a weird way – clever choppy chords. There's no real form to it as such, but some interesting sequences".

Radiohead cited Juju, with Thom Yorke, Ed O'Brien and Colin Greenwood all mentioning their liking for the album. O'Brien remembered recording "Spellbound" on a tape recorder after listening to the charts, noting that "it was a great era of music". John Frusciante of Red Hot Chili Peppers mentioned it as one of his influences for the album By the Way. He said: "John McGeoch is a guitarist I want to be. He's got a new brilliant idea at each song. I generally listen to the records he recorded with Magazine and Siouxsie and the Banshees, Juju". Billy Corgan of the Smashing Pumpkins selected "Arabian Knights" when he talked about some of his favourite music on BBC radio: commenting the song, he said that "Siouxsie and the Banshees were able to unlock certain rhythms and feelings that are still in alt rock today". Duane Denison of the Jesus Lizard chose McGeoch as his favourite guitarist for his playing, especially on Juju, saying: it was "atmospheric and aggressive" and "truly inspiring to me".

William Reid of the Jesus and Mary Chain selected "Spellbound" in a playlist including some of his favourite tracks. Suede's singer Brett Anderson cited Juju as one of his reference points.

== Track listing ==
All lyrics are written by Siouxsie Sioux, except where noted; all music is composed by Siouxsie and the Banshees (Siouxsie, Steven Severin, Budgie and John McGeoch).

Side A
No.	Title	Lyrics	Length
1.	"Spellbound"	Severin	3:20
2.	"Into the Light"		4:15
3.	"Arabian Knights"		3:05
4.	"Halloween"	Severin	3:37
5.	"Monitor"		5:33

Side B
No.	Title	Length
1.	"Night Shift"	6:06
2.	"Sin in My Heart"	3:37
3.	"Head Cut"	4:22
4.	"Voodoo Dolly"	7:04

2006 CD remastered reissue bonus tracks
No.	Title	Lyrics	Length
10.	"Spellbound" (12" extended mix)	Severin	4:41
11.	"Arabian Knights" (12" vocoder mix)		3:09
12.	"Fireworks" (Nigel Gray unreleased version)	Severin	4:13

== Personnel ==
Siouxsie and the Banshees

- Siouxsie Sioux – vocals, guitar on "Sin in My Heart"
- Steven Severin – bass guitar
- Budgie – drums, percussion
- John McGeoch – guitar

Technical

- Nigel Gray – production
- Rob O'Connor – sleeve design
- Joe Lyons – sleeve photography

== Charts ==
Chart performance for Juju
Chart (1981)	Peak position
New Zealand Albums (RMNZ)	29
UK Albums (Official Charts)	7

== Certifications ==
Certifications for Juju
Region	Certification	Certified units/sales
United Kingdom (BPI)	Silver	60,000^{^}
^{^} Shipments figures based on certification alone.

== Bibliography ==
- Sullivan-Burke, Rory (April 2022). The Light Pours Out of Me: The Authorised Biography of John McGeoch. Omnibus Press. ISBN 978-1913172664.

== Sources ==
- Paytress, Mark (2003). Siouxsie & the Banshees – The Authorised Biography. Sanctuary Publishing Limited. ISBN 1-86074-375-7.
