= Arabian Knights (song) =

Single by Siouxsie and the Banshees

from the album Juju
- B-side: "Supernatural Thing", "Congo Conga"
- Released: 24 July 1981
- Recorded: 1981
- Genre: Psychedelic rock; post-punk; neo-psychedelia
- Length: 3:08
- Label: Polydor
- Songwriters: Susan Ballion, Peter Edward Clarke, John McGeoch and Steven Severin
- Producers: Nigel Gray; Siouxsie and the Banshees

Siouxsie and the Banshees singles chronology
| "Spellbound" (1981) | "Arabian Knights" (1981) | "Fireworks" (1982) |

Music video
- "Arabian Knights" on YouTube

Siouxsie Sioux singles chronology
| "Spellbound" (1981) | "Arabian Knights" (1981) | "Wild Things the Creatures" (1981) |

"Arabian Knights" is a song by English post-punk band Siouxsie and the Banshees. The track was written by Siouxsie and the Banshees and co-produced with Nigel Gray. It was released in 1981 as the second and final single released from their fourth studio album, Juju.

== Content and release ==
Siouxsie commented on the lyrics: "With 'Arabian Knights' it was quite a thrill to get the word 'orifices' on the radio." The B-side, "Supernatural Thing", was originally recorded by Ben E. King, appearing on his 1975 album Supernatural.

"Arabian Knights" was released on 24 July 1981 by record label Polydor. The single peaked at number 32 on the UK Singles Chart in 1981.

== Music, reception and legacy ==
The Guardian retrospectively qualified "Arabian Knights" as a "pop marvel" while AllMusic described it as "dreamy".

Billy Corgan of the Smashing Pumpkins selected it in his playlist in December 2014 when he talked about some of his favourite music on BBC radio.

== Cover versions ==
Paul Roland covered "Arabian Knights" on his 1992 album Strychnine, while Icky Blossoms released it as a single in 2013. Las Aves also covered it during a live session for French Television in 2014.

== Track listing ==
7"

Side A
| No. | Title | Length |
|---|---|---|
| 1. | "Arabian Knights" | 3:08 |

Side B
| No. | Title | Length |
|---|---|---|
| 1. | ""Supernatural Thing"" | 4:26 |

12"

Side A
| No. | Title | Length |
|---|---|---|
| 1. | "Arabian Knights" | 3:09 |

Side B
| No. | Title | Length |
|---|---|---|
| 1. | "Supernatural Thing" | 4:26 |
| 2. | "Congo Conga" | 4:14 |

== Charts ==
| Chart (1981) | Peak position |
|---|---|
| UK Singles Chart | 32 |
