= Abracadabra (Lady Gaga song) =

2025 single by Lady Gaga

Single by Lady Gaga

from the album Mayhem
- Released: February 3, 2025
- Studio: Shangri-La (Malibu)
- Genre: Dance; dance-pop; electropop; synth-pop; acid techno
- Length: 3:43
- Label: Interscope
- Songwriters: Lady Gaga; Andrew Watt; Henry Walter; Susan Janet Ballion; Peter Edward Clarke; Steven Severin; John McGeoch
- Producers: Lady Gaga; Andrew Watt; Cirkut

Lady Gaga singles chronology
"Disease" (2024)	"Abracadabra" (2025)	"The Dead Dance" (2025)

Music video
- "Abracadabra" on YouTube

"Abracadabra" is a song recorded by American singer-songwriter Lady Gaga for her studio album, Mayhem (2025). It was written and produced by Gaga, Andrew Watt, and Cirkut, with additional songwriting credits to members of Siouxsie and the Banshees, as it incorporates elements from their 1981 single "Spellbound". Musically, it is a dance, dance-pop, electropop, synth-pop, and acid techno track with electronic, industrial, house, and psychedelic influences. The song's lyrics, according to Gaga, reflect on facing life's challenges and finding a sense of magic in them. "Abracadabra" was released through Interscope Records on February 3, 2025, as the album's second single.

An accompanying music video, co-directed by Gaga, Parris Goebel, and Bethany Vargas, depicts a dance battle between two contrasting personas of the singer and premiered on February 3, following a teaser which aired during a commercial break at the 67th Annual Grammy Awards. Critics praised its theatrical style and cinematography, drawing favorable comparisons to her earlier work. Gaga performed "Abracadabra" on Saturday Night Live, The Howard Stern Show, the MTV Video Music Awards 2025 and the 2026 Grammy Awards. She also sang it as part of the opening act for some concerts promoting Mayhem, including during the Mayhem Ball tour, and incorporated a remix of the track by French producer Gesaffelstein as a show interlude, which was released on digital platforms. Gaga also performed a reimagined version of the song for Mayhem Requiem.

"Abracadabra" received critical acclaim, with reviewers praising its production, rhythm, songwriting and chorus, and various critics ranked it among the best songs of 2025. Commercially, the song topped the charts in Hungary and Lithuania, while reaching the top ten in Austria, Brazil, Croatia, Finland, Germany, Ireland, Luxembourg, the Netherlands, Norway, Portugal, Singapore, Sweden, Switzerland, the United Kingdom, and on the Billboard Global 200. "Abracadabra" also charted within the top twenty in Australia, Belgium, Canada, Costa Rica, France, New Zealand, the Philippines, Taiwan, the United Arab Emirates, and the United States. It also received diamond certifications in Brazil and France as well as platinum certifications in Australia, Austria, Belgium, Canada, the Czech Republic, Greece, New Zealand, Poland, Portugal, Slovakia, and the United Kingdom. At the 68th Annual Grammy Awards, "Abracadabra" was nominated for Record of the Year, Song of the Year, Best Dance Pop Recording, and—for its Gesaffelstein remix—Best Remixed Recording, Non-Classical, winning the latter two.

== Development and release ==
Gaga first spoke about her new music in March 2024, when she said she was "writing some of my best music in as long as I can remember", and later explained that the Chromatica Ball tour in 2022 strongly shaped her creative process for the new material. In late July of that year, she performed at the opening ceremony of the 2024 Paris Olympics and, while in the city, surprised fans by sharing snippets of two unreleased songs intended for her upcoming album. According to Billboard, the previews featured thumping beats and bass-heavy keyboards. Shortly after Gaga announced on January 27, 2025 that her next studio album would be titled Mayhem (2025), it was revealed she would premiere a new single and video during the 67th Annual Grammy Awards on February 2. (Note: Attributed to multiple references:)

"Abracadabra" was released for digital download and streaming platforms on February 3, 2025, through Interscope Records. It was subsequently serviced to Italian radio, followed by contemporary hit radio in the United States on February 11, 2025.

== Writing and recording ==
During an episode of the Song Exploder podcast, Gaga explained that she and her collaborators were initially working on a slower song that was ultimately scrapped from Mayhem. When producer Cirkut later played her an instrumental he had been developing, she was drawn to its intensity and decided to begin a new song, which became "Abracadabra". The first line she wrote was "Like a poem said by a lady in red, you hear the last few words of your life", which she intended to evoke the preparation of a spell in a ritual. This was followed by the creation of the chord progression, which Cirkut incorporated into the track to form the chorus. Song engineer Paul Lamalfa compiled a selection of words to shape the song's stuttering post-chorus, including "amor" and "morta", Latin for "love" and "death", respectively.

In an interview with The Howard Stern Show, Gaga said the song came together quickly, with the track, verses, and chorus taking about 30 minutes to complete. She contrasted this with other songs from Mayhem, which sometimes took longer to finalize. Producer Andrew Watt described the recording sessions as "spontaneous", explaining that she immediately responded to the instrumental by grabbing the microphone and beginning to freestyle. He noted that once the initial idea emerged, she would move to the piano to shape the song's chord structure, after which the arrangement was further developed through layered synthesizers and iterative recording between the control room and live room.

== Composition and production ==
"Abracadabra"
A sample of the song's post-chorus, featuring pulsating electronic beats, Gaga's rhythmic vocals, and lyrics repeating the term "abracadabra".

"Abracadabra" was written and produced by Gaga, Andrew Watt, and Cirkut. Additionally, Siouxsie and the Banshees members Susan Janet Ballion, Peter Edward Clarke, Steven Severin, and John McGeoch received songwriting credits, as it incorporates elements from their 1981 single "Spellbound". The track features lead vocals and keyboards by Gaga, with additional instrumentation by Watt and programming by Cirkut. It was recorded at Shangri-La Studios in Malibu and later mixed and mastered by Serban Ghenea and Randy Merrill, respectively.

The song is a fast-tempo dance, dance-pop, electropop, synth-pop, and acid techno track with electronic, industrial, house, and psychedelic influences. Sheet music published by Musicnotes denotes the song in common time and in the key of F Dorian. Gaga's vocal range spans from the low-note of B♭_{3} to the high-note of F_{5}. The song is structured around multiple verses and builds toward a chorus, followed by a post-chorus where Gaga repeats the title in "broken syntax". It blends electronic and house-influenced production with piano and bass layers, built around a rhythmic synth foundation. Gaga's vocal delivery in the song has been described as "dramatic" and "full-throated", although she also employs a more "ethereal" tone during the song's bridge.

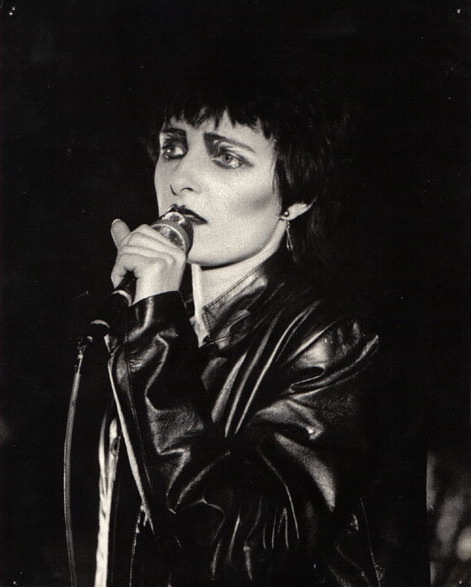
Siouxsie Sioux (pictured), whose 1981 song "Spellbound" is interpolated in "Abracadabra"

Gaga described the instrumental as deliberately challenging due to its dense and chaotic structure, recalling that Watt initially questioned how to write over such a "busy" beat. This complexity was precisely what drew her in, as she felt connected to its sharp, frenetic energy and approached the track through improvised vocal freestyling before formal lyrics were written. She explained that much of the song's early structure emerged organically, with chord progressions developed on piano and guitar to resolve the tension of Cirkut's atonal basslines. The production went through several iterations, which Gaga explained amounted to "like, three different versions of production", before ultimately settling into a house-influenced arrangement. She described the decision as "emotional" and "full circle", explaining that it felt right because everything for her "always went back to the dance floor".

Lyrically, the term abracadabra is used throughout the song to represent magic. The words appear in the song's chorus – "Abracadabra, amor-ooh-na-na, abracadabra, morta-ooh-ga-ga" – and also include the Latin words "amor" and "morta" ("love" and "death"). In addition, the term "abracadabra" is incorporated into the song's post-chorus, albeit with "broken syntax". In the song's refrain, a "lady in red" is mentioned, which Gaga described as representing every individual's "internal monologue" asking if they are good enough. She further explained that the song explores resilience and perseverance, using the dance floor as a metaphor for confronting self-doubt and pushing oneself to grow rather than merely survive. Writing for InStyle, Jonathan Borge wrote that the song "explores the duality of an artist battling the desire to constantly evolve sonically, aesthetically, and as a human, while facing extraordinary creative pressure". Gina Wurtz of Screen Rant described the song's message as "deeper than it appears on the surface", interpreting its lyrics as an encouragement to ignore negative voices and stay focused on one's own path. Elite Daily theorized that the use of the word "amor" could also serve as a hidden nod to "Bad Romance", as its reverse spelling ("roma") is a recurring word in that chorus. Many journalists have compared the song's dark and theatrical style to Gaga's earlier songs, including those from The Fame Monster (2009) and Chromatica (2020).

== Critical reception ==
"Abracadabra" received universal acclaim upon its release, with critics commending it for its production, energy, and catchy chorus. (Note: Attributed to multiple sources:) Many compared it to Gaga's early works, noting its influence from late-2000s dance-pop, as well as its continuation of the dark electronic sounds explored in "Disease". (Note: Attributed to multiple sources:) Larisha Paul of Rolling Stone noted that Gaga is "always drawing upon her knowledge of the history of music" and described the song as "a showcase of her return to dark pop that pays homage to the influences that shaped her career". Kyle Denis of Billboard described the track as an "explosive new dance-pop single" highlighted its "high intensity", while pointing out that it builds upon the dark electronic elements introduced in her previous release, "Disease", while Stephen Daw felt that the song reworks familiar elements from Gaga's earlier albums and ultimately "casts a spell to create an absolute pop smash". Lindsay Zoladz of The New York Times described it as a nostalgically charged return to form, comparing its infectious hook to "Bad Romance" (2009) and its bold electronic edge to Gaga's early work. Maria Sherman of the Associated Press described "Abracadabra" as "life-affirming dance music", while Abby Jones of Stereogum called it "quintessentially Lady Gaga".

Robin Murray of Clash described "Abracadabra" as "a thrilling piece of pop music that moves from light to shadow with expert control". L'Officiel editor Alessandro Viapiana complimented the song's piercing rhythm, pulsating synthesizers, and hypnotic vocal delivery. The Independent's Adam White wrote that the song initially feels like an exaggerated version of a typical Gaga track, but described its intensity as a major return to form. Writing for DIY, Daisy Carter described the song as an unrestrained dancefloor anthem that recalls Gaga's The Fame Monster era, pointing to its nonsensical yet catchy chorus. Gina Wurtz of Screen Rant similarly regarded it as her strongest single in years, viewing it as a return to her "authentic dark pop" sound. Pitchfork's Walden Green remarked that Gaga had not released a single this strong since 2013's "G.U.Y.", noting its tight hook and the blend of influences from across her career. Bustle referred to the track as "a dancefloor smash tailor-made for her fans", adding that "as the title suggests, Gaga casts a spell with her new single, commanding listeners to dance all night".

A Vulture article in 2025 ranked it as Gaga's eighth best song, describing it as a distinctive and life-affirming entry in her discography. HuffPost's Daniel Welsh called it an "infectious" track that recalls the energy of The Fame (2008) and Born This Way (2011), while Marie Claire dubbed it a "vampiric dance anthem". Writing for GO, Abbie Thompson emphasized its "catchy chorus, vibrant house beats and piercing rhythm", predicting it would become a staple in queer nightlife.

=== Year-end lists ===
"Abracadabra" was frequently ranked as one of the best songs of 2025 and was included in various year-end lists from music critics. Rolling Stone's Kory Grow ranked it at number one, praising its dynamic synth work, sweeping hook, and the way it channels Gaga's early pop sensibilities. Wesley Stenzel of Entertainment Weekly also placed it at number one, praising its blend of gothic theatricality, powerful vocals, and club-oriented production. Billboard's Joe Lynch placed the track at number two, describing it as a "sleazy, slinky club banger" that showcases her vocal maturity. The song placed at number four on The Guardian's list, where Ben Beaumont-Thomas commended its dual house beats and "double the fun" flair, and also ranked fourth on USA Today's year-end list, with Melissa Ruggieri underscoring its "pulsating beat" and chorus filled with "delicious nonsensical words". Paolo Ragusa of Consequence ranked it at number eight, praising its cathartic intensity and describing it as one of her strongest dance-floor creations, a position it shared on Stereogum, where Tom Breihan called it a "mega-goth burst of explosive energy". NME's Ben Jolley placed the song at number twenty, commending its synth-driven sound, "delightfully nonsensical" hook, and club-ready appeal, while Pitchfork ranked it at number twenty-nine, with Shaad D'Souza describing it as a "psychedelic and ferocious" acid-techno track. Slant Magazine included the song at number forty-six, and Associated Press also singled it out among the best songs of the year, praising its maximalist electro-pop production and calling it a "one-woman masterclass in dance-pop".

Select rankings of "Abracadabra"
Publication	List	Rank	Ref.
Associated Press	The 10 Best Songs of 2025	—N/a	
Billboard	The 100 Best Songs of 2025	2	
Consequence	The 200 Best Songs of 2025	8	
Entertainment Weekly	The 10 Best Songs of 2025	1	
The Guardian	The 20 Best Songs of 2025	4	
NME	The 50 Best Songs of 2025	20	
Rolling Stone	The 100 Best Songs of 2025	1	
Stereogum	The 50 Best Songs of 2025	8	
USA Today	10 Best Songs of 2025	4	

== Commercial performance ==
On its release day, "Abracadabra" recorded 4.92 million streams on Spotify, marking Gaga's biggest debut on the platform with a solo song. Internationally, the song debuted at number ten on the Billboard Global 200 with 47.7 million streams, becoming the second top-ten entry from Mayhem and of Gaga's career, after "Die with a Smile". In its second week, the song rose to a new peak of number five on the Billboard Global 200 with 78.4 million streams.

In the United States, "Abracadabra" debuted atop the Billboard Hot Dance/Pop Songs chart and at number twenty-nine on the Billboard Hot 100 with a partial first tracking week, accumulating 13.7 million streams, 1.3 million radio audience impressions, and 10,000 downloads. With this feat, Mayhem became Gaga's first album since Artpop (2013) to achieve three top-forty entries on the Billboard Hot 100 prior to an album's official release. In its second week on the chart, the song climbed to a new peak of number thirteen. In its sixth week of charting, following the release of Mayhem, the song rose ten spots to number 19. In Canada, the song peaked at number twelve on the Canadian Hot 100. It was later certified double platinum by Music Canada (MC). In Brazil, "Abracadabra" debuted at number sixteen on the Brasil Hot 100 and later rose to a peak of number three following Gaga's show in the country. It was subsequently certified triple diamond by Pro-Música Brasil.

In the United Kingdom, it debuted at number six on the UK Singles Chart after only four days of tracking, marking Gaga's 17th top-ten song in the country and third from Mayhem, after "Die with a Smile" and "Disease". In its second week, the song rose to a new peak of number three on the UK Singles Chart, becoming her first solo top-five entry since "Stupid Love" (2020) and highest-charting solo entry since "Born This Way" (2011). The British Phonographic Industry (BPI) awarded it platinum certification. Elsewhere in Europe, "Abracadabra" achieved top-five placements in the sales-and-streaming charts in four countries, while also reaching the top ten of several others. In the Baltic region, the song topped the charts in Lithuania and Latvia. Across the continent, it received multiple certifications, earning a diamond certification in France and either platinum or gold awards in others.

In Asia, "Abracadabra" reached number four in Singapore, and number twelve in Taiwan. In Australia, the song peaked at number twelve on the ARIA Singles Chart and was later certified double platinum by the Australian Recording Industry Association (ARIA). In New Zealand, it peaked at number thirteen on the Top 40 Singles Chart and was subsequently certified platinum by Recorded Music NZ (RMNZ).

== Music video ==
=== Development ===
The music video for "Abracadabra" was directed by Gaga alongside Parris Goebel and Bethany Vargas; Goebel also served as choreographer. The video premiered during a commercial break in conjunction with Mastercard at the 67th Annual Grammy Awards and was later released on the singer's platforms. Gaga explained that the concept for the video originated after filming "Disease", when she and Goebel discussed continuing the album's narrative, exploring "these conflicting sides of ourselves that really don't make sense but just keep having this discussion". She later said that they worked closely on how to translate those conflicts into choreography, noting that "there are only two options: you can dance or it's over", and recalled experimenting with wigs, makeup, and costumes in rehearsals to achieve the most impactful result. Goebel told InStyle that after hearing "Abracadabra" she envisioned ideas for the video, saying they wanted people "to dance again and find freedom on the dance floor". She described the project as theatrical yet deeply personal, centered on creating a "club Gaga" as a world of its own.

The creative process, set preparations, and rehearsals lasted approximately three weeks, while the actual shoot took place over two days at a studio in Santa Monica in early December 2024. Gaga highlighted that sustainability was a key factor in the video's production, ensuring that only necessary materials were used and minimizing new manufacturing. Several white costumes were repurposed from old wedding dresses, deadstock fabric, and discarded textiles from her previous projects. On February 18, Mastercard released a behind-the-scenes feature showing rehearsals and production details. In it, Gaga discussed the two personas she portrays in the video, "Mistress of Mayhem" and "Virgin Gaga", framing the narrative as "an inner struggle with a demon... the parts of you that challenge you make you stronger". On March 29, Mastercard released an alternate cut titled "Abracadabra (Fan Version)", featuring 32 contest winners performing the original choreography under the direction of Goebel.

=== Synopsis ===
Gaga during the "dance battle" sequence of the music video, where the scenes rapidly alternate between her white and red personas

The music video opens with the Mistress of Mayhem standing on the upper level of a grand venue, dressed in a spiked red latex outfit. She declares, "The category is dance or die", triggering an intense choreography sequence featuring a crowd of forty dancers dressed in white. Throughout the video, two versions of Gaga alternate: the white-clad Gaga (Virgin Gaga) exudes frenetic energy, while her red-clad counterpart (Mistress of Mayhem) remains more composed, symbolizing a dance battle between light and darkness. Near the end of the video, the music briefly cuts out as Virgin Gaga lets out a scream while surrounded by the dancers. Speaking about the moment, she explained that it represents a point where she feels as though she can no longer keep dancing, and that the "dance or die" premise reflects a moment of fear and uncertainty about whether she has the strength to continue.

Speaking to Elle, Gaga explained the video's concept revolves around "being ready to face challenges", with the lady in red daring the audience to "dance for their lives". She also described the visual as a complement to the song, stating, "When you hear 'Abracadabra' for the first time, you might think, 'What is this about? It's fun to listen to, but what does it mean?' For me, watching the video makes it clear—it's about moving forward". Along with Goebel, Gaga announced a choreography contest, with a chance to be featured in an official fan video.

=== Reception ===
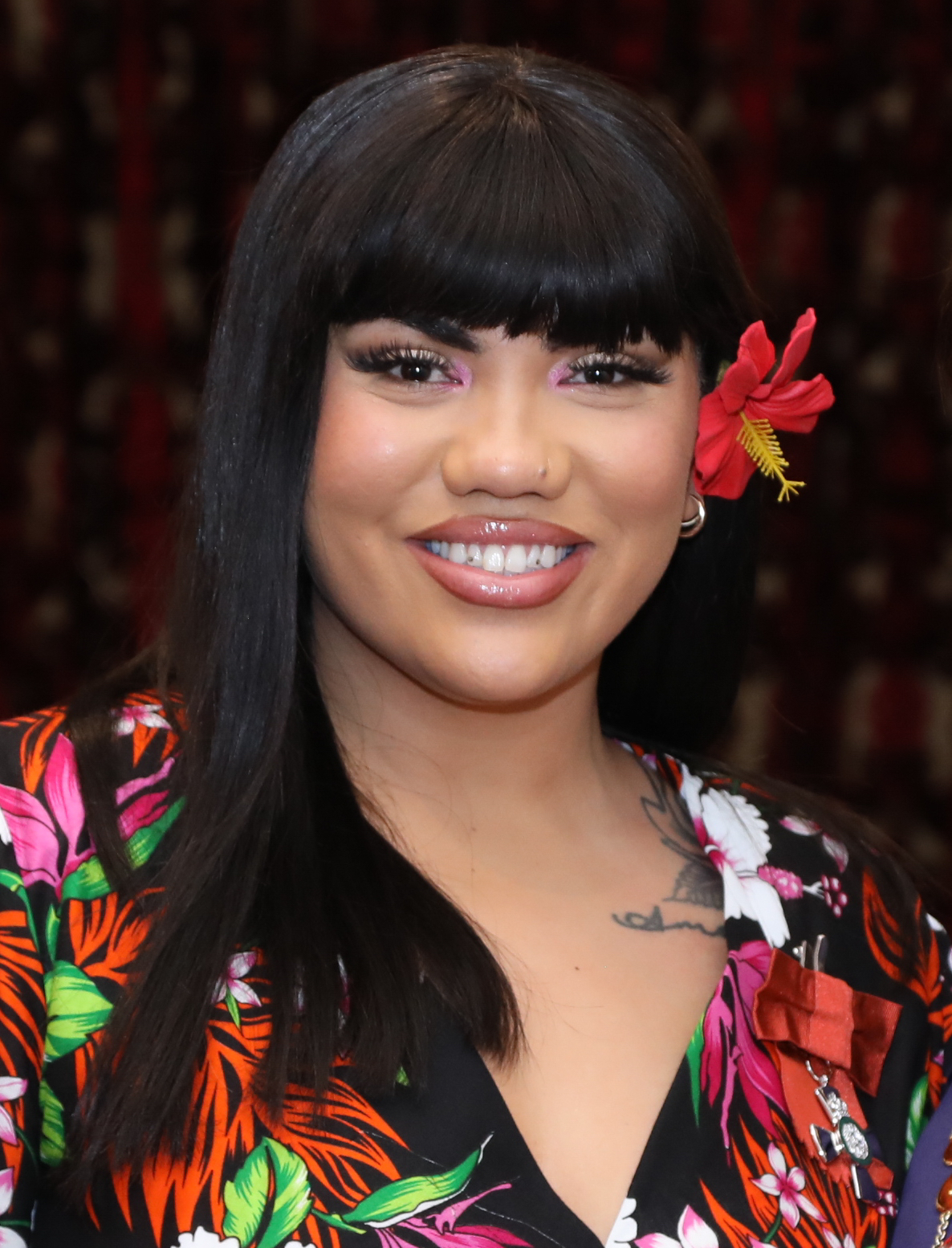
Parris Goebel, choreographer and co-director of the video

The music video received positive reviews upon release, with critics and fans highlighting its dark and theatrical style and noting visual references to "Bad Romance" (2009), while co-director Parris Goebel said such comparisons were not intentional but reflected Gaga's "personality and DNA in her work". Upon release, the music video reached number one on YouTube's trending chart.

Rolling Stone writer Paul highlighted the video's frenetic choreography, describing it as "an eruption of chaos and movement", while also noting that "its aesthetics reinforce the concept of Mayhem and, along with the song, recall The Fame Monster era with its dark and theatrical visual style". Denis of Billboard stated that the clip evokes "Bad Romance" with "its meticulous display of the intersection of various art forms" along with "jaw-dropping high fashion" aesthetics. Green of Pitchfork remarked like the music video for "Disease" it is "a high-concept production with impeccable styling. Gaga remains a step above the average pop star; her true competition is the ghosts of her own past". Abbie Thompson of GO stated that "combined with intense strobe lighting and Parris Goebel's incredibly indulgent choreography, this video will surely make fans say one thing: we're back". Eva Blanco Medina of Vogue España praised its striking opening, noting that the video begins with a clear message: "Dance or die", setting the stage for a "high-voltage choreographic showcase". A Vulture article argued that "in pop music, the person in the spotlight is both subject and object", which is evident in the video, "where Gaga plays both the mythical lady in red casting judgment and the white witch being tormented by the manic choreography".

HuffPost UK's Daniel Welsh declared it to be "one of the best music videos of her career". Daniel D’Addario of Variety described the video as "a return to Gaga's most extravagant and maximalist aesthetic," praising its "grand and elaborate visual production" as well as the contrast between the two versions of the singer, dressed in white and red, which reinforce the theatricality of the concept. Erin Crabtree and Eliza Thompson of Us Weekly wrote that it "features numerous dance sequences and the kind of extravagant outfits the singer favored in the early years of her career". Cristina Zavala of Los 40 called it "a well-resolved play of contrasts that turns this music video into a cinematic jewel full of Gaga's trademark intensity". Gina Wurtz of Screen Rant noted that while the video is "fairly simple," it impressed her because "the choreography and fashion made it so interesting," adding that "Abracadabra" marks Gaga's return to the type of choreography that defined some of her most memorable videos. Wesley Stenzel of Entertainment Weekly praised the video's "jittery choreography" and "nightmarish atmosphere", calling it one of the most exhilarating music videos of 2025. The music video for "Abracadabra" won two awards at the 2025 MTV Video Music Awards, for Best Direction and Best Art Direction.

== Live performances ==
On March 8, 2025, Gaga performed "Abracadabra" on Saturday Night Live. She appeared on stage in a sparkly red ensemble, standing inside a neon-lit, mirrored structure, accompanied by dancers dressed in black with long red wigs. Chris Willman of Variety described the performance as an extension of the song's "crimson-themed music video", with Gaga and her dancersue executing synchronized, "herky-jerky" movements that maximized the limited space of Studio 8H. William Vaillancourt of Rolling Stone praised the singer's "overflowing intensity," while HuffPost's Daniel Welsh described the performance as "a must-watch for even the most casual of Lady Gaga fans". Matt Mitchell of Paste described it as "fantastic", while Karen Valby of Vanity Fair highlighted its camp sensibility and noted influences from the film Conclave (2024). On March 11, 2025, Gaga performed an acoustic version of "Abracadabra" live on The Howard Stern Show.

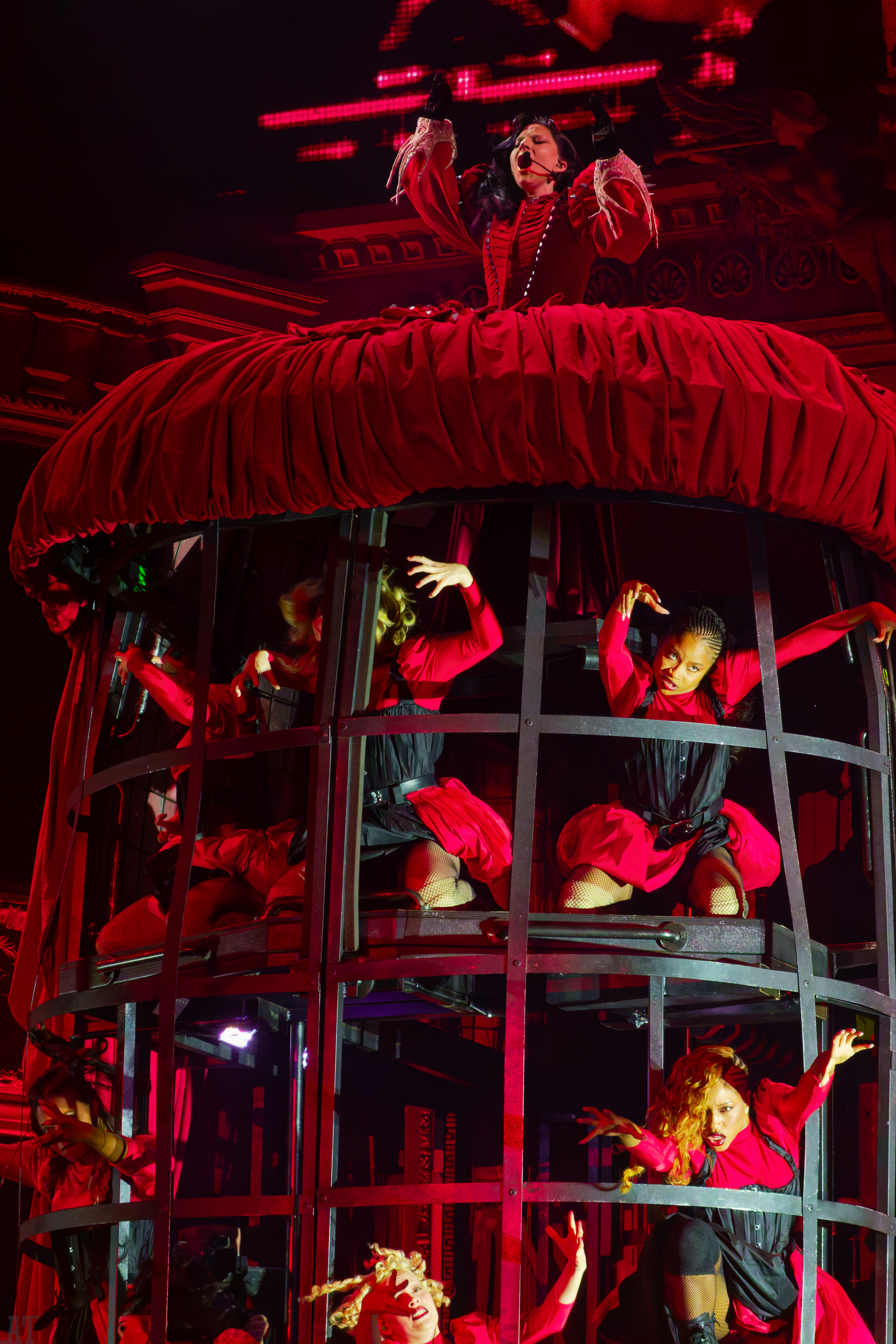
Gaga performing "Abracadabra" during The Mayhem Ball tour, with her dancers encased in a steel frame cage beneath her

In April–May 2025, "Abracadabra" was performed as the second song of Gaga's promotional concerts for Mayhem, which included a headlining set at Coachella. During the opening segment, Act I: Of Velvet and Vice, Gaga emerged atop a 25-foot Tudor-style red gown. After a brief orchestral introduction, she declared, "the category is dance or die", before transitioning into the song. The skirt of her dress revealed a steel frame cage entrapping her dancers, who remained encased beneath her as the performance began. As the song progressed, Gaga descended to the stage to join the dancers, removing a top layer of her attire to reveal a red dress, before returning to the top of the cage for the finale. Rolling Stone's Tomás Mier opined Gaga "channeled a Victorian-era opera singer in a dark parallel universe" for the song. The song was later added to the Mayhem Ball tour (2025–2026), where Gaga reprised the same performance scene. At the tour's final Los Angeles show on February 23, 2026, she also sang it in a stripped-down rendition as a surprise song at the piano. On September 7, 2025, Gaga performed "Abracadabra" as part of a pre-recorded segment for the 2025 MTV Video Music Awards, filmed during one of the tour's concerts at Madison Square Garden in New York City, along with "The Dead Dance". The performance was highlighted by various outlets as one of the night's most memorable moments. (Note: Attributed to multiple references:)

On May 13, 2025, Gaga performed "Abracadabra" during a five-song set at the YouTube Brandcast event, held at the David Geffen Hall in New York City. The performance featured cinematic staging and opened the showcase. On May 31, 2025, Gaga took part in Netflix's Tudum event with a special performance inspired by Wednesday. After performing the track "Zombieboy", Gaga exited for a costume change while a group of female dancers appeared dressed as Wednesday Addams. Jenna Ortega, who plays the character in Wednesday, walked across the stage and sat at a dining table set with decapitated heads. Gaga then returned wearing a red velvet dress with an asymmetric hemline, her platinum-blonde hair styled high in a dramatic bouffant, and crimson lipstick smudged across her face. Standing on the table, she performed "Abracadabra", surrounded by the dancers. At the end of the song, Gaga climbed back into her coffin alongside Thing, the disembodied hand character, while the The Addams Family theme song played. She blew a final kiss to the audience as the coffin closed on her, showing the inscription "Here lies the monster queen". On October 3, Gaga performed "Abracadabra" on the piano at Santa Monica, California's radio station KCRW.

On February 1, 2026, Gaga performed a rock-arranged version of "Abracadabra" at the 68th Annual Grammy Awards, playing a Minimoog and backed by a live band that included producer Watt on guitar and Nine Inch Nails drummer Josh Freese. She wore a red and black feathered bolero jacket and sculpted skirt from Alexander McQueen's The Horn of Plenty fall/winter 2009 collection, paired with a basket-like wicker headpiece by Philip Treacy. The camera work was coordinated using a programmed robotic arm, marking the first time such technology was used at an awards ceremony. Rolling Stone described the performance as "both larger-than-life and intimate all at once," noting an arrangement that blended the disco-pop bounce of Nile Rodgers' guitar on "Let's Dance" (1983) with the beat-heavy sound of Nine Inch Nails. Billboard's Joe Lynch emphasized the performance's "cinematic" camera work and Gaga's ability to make "small movements feel monumental". Kiana Fitzgerald from Consequence characterized it as a high-energy, stylized rendition with an intensified arrangement and dramatic climax. Grammy Awards executive producer Ben Winston stated that the minimalist, band-focused concept was shaped by Gaga's limited rehearsal time, having returned from touring in Japan less than 36 hours before the ceremony. A reimagined version of "Abracadabra" appeared in Gaga's concert film and live album Apple Music Live: Mayhem Requiem, released on May 14, 2026. The performance was recorded during an invite-only concert at the Wiltern Theatre in Los Angeles in January 2026. For the number, Gaga appeared dressed in black and wearing a chain-mail veil; she began the song at the piano before the arrangement shifted into a darker techno-pop reinterpretation after the first chorus.

== Remix and cover versions ==
A remix version of "Abracadabra" by French producer Gesaffelstein debuted in the form of an interlude during Gaga's first Coachella show on April 12, 2025, and became available digitally the same day. It remained part of the setlist of Gaga's promotional concerts and tour between 2025–2026. The remix shifts the pop track into a more experimental direction, incorporating heavier club-style bass and a fragmented, hook-like treatment of Gaga's vocal lines. Jason Heffler of EDM.com opined that the remix is both an expected partnership and one that triggers "something primal". He stated that Gesaffelstein trades the original's sleek pop finish for a dense, brooding production, driven by sharp synths that "wail like banshees in an operatic nightmare," marking a nod to his electro-noir roots.

In April 2025, American singer Lucy Dacus covered "Abracadabra" in a BBC Radio 1’s Live Lounge session. In July 2025, American comedians Bowen Yang and Matt Rogers opened the Las Culturistas Culture Awards with the song. On October 30, 2025, English band Florence and the Machine sang it for SiriusXM's The Spectrum, as a mash-up with their own track "Which Witch" (2015).

On September 24, 2026, the Japanese gothic metal virtual band Ave Mujica, a unit from the multimedia franchise BanG Dream!, released a cover version of "Abracadabra".

== Accolades ==
"Abracadabra" received multiple award nominations recognizing both the song and its accompanying music video. The track earned four nominations at the 68th Annual Grammy Awards, including Song of the Year and Record of the Year, and won Best Dance Pop Recording as well as Best Remixed Recording, Non-Classical for the Gesaffelstein remix. Additional honors and nominations were largely tied to its visual presentation, with recognition from industry organizations such as the Webby Awards, Cannes Lions, and the Berlin Music Video Awards.

Organization	Year	Category	Result	Ref.
ADC Awards	2025	Motion / Film / Music Video	Merit	
ADC Awards	2025	Craft in Motion / Film / Editing	Merit	
ADG Excellence in Production Design Awards	2025	Short Format & Music Videos	Nominated	
American Music Awards	2026	Best Vocal Performance	Nominated	
American Scene Awards	2025	Music & Sound Recordings	Nominated	
ASCAP Pop Music Awards	2026	Most Performed Songs	Won	
Berlin Commercial Festival	2025	Craft: Editing	Nominated	
Berlin Music Video Awards	2025	Best Editor	Nominated	
BMI Pop Awards	2026	Most-Performed Songs of the Year	Won	
BreakTudo Awards	2025	International Music Video	Nominated	
Clio Music Awards	2026	Editing	Gold	
D&AD Pencil Awards	2025	Music Videos / Performance	Nominated	
Emma Gaala	2026	Most Streamed International Song of the Year	Won	
Grammy Awards	2026	Song of the Year	Nominated	
Grammy Awards	2026	Record of the Year	Nominated	
Grammy Awards	2026	Best Dance Pop Recording	Won	
Grammy Awards	2026	Best Remixed Recording, Non-Classical (Gesaffelstein Remix)	Won	
Grindr Unwrapped Awards	2025	Song of the Year	Won	
Grindr Unwrapped Awards	2025	Music Video of the Year	Won	
Hollywood Music Video Awards	2026	Music Video of the Year	Nominated	
Hollywood Music Video Awards	2026	Best Pop	Nominated	
iHeartRadio Music Awards	2026	Favorite TikTok Dance	Nominated	
iHeartRadio Music Awards	2026	Best Music Video	Nominated	
Japan Gold Disc Awards	2026	Song of the Year by Streaming (Western)	Won	
Las Culturistas Culture Awards	2025	Most Iconic Building or Structure (Mirror House – SNL)	Nominated	
Las Culturistas Culture Awards	2025	Record of the Year	Won	
Make-Up Artists & Hair Stylists Guild Awards	2025	Best Make-Up in a Commercial/Music Video	Won	
MTV Video Music Awards	2025	Best Direction	Won	
MTV Video Music Awards	2025	Best Art Direction	Won	
MTV Video Music Awards	2025	Best Cinematography	Nominated	
MTV Video Music Awards	2025	Best Editing	Nominated	
MTV Video Music Awards	2025	Best Choreography	Nominated	
MTV Video Music Awards	2025	Best Visual Effects	Nominated	
Music Awards Japan	2026	Best International Pop Song in Japan	Won	
Music Awards Japan	2026	Best of Listeners' Choice: International Song	Nominated	
New Music Awards	2026	Top 40/CHR Song of the Year	Nominated	
Nickelodeon Kids' Choice Awards	2025	Favorite Song	Nominated	
NRJ Music Awards	2025	International Hit of the Year	Nominated	
Queerties Awards	2026	Anthem	Won	
Rockbjörnen	2025	Foreign Song of the Year	Nominated	
RTHK International Pop Poll Awards	2025	Top Ten International Gold Songs	Won	
Webby Awards	2025	Music Video (Video & Film)	Nominated	

== Credits and personnel ==
Credits are adapted from the liner notes of Mayhem.

Personnel

- Lady Gaga – songwriting, production, lead vocals, background vocals, keyboards
- Andrew Watt – songwriting, production, drums, bass guitar, electric guitar, keyboards
- Cirkut – songwriting, production, drum programming, bass programming, synthesizers, keyboards
- Susan Janet Ballion – songwriting (interpolation)
- Peter Edward Clarke – songwriting (interpolation)
- Steven Severin – songwriting (interpolation)
- John McGeoch – songwriting (interpolation)
- Paul Lamalfa – recording engineer
- Marco Sonzini – additional engineer
- Tyler Harris – assistant engineer
- Serban Ghenea – mixing engineer
- Bryce Bordone – assistant mixing engineer
- Randy Merrill – mastering engineer
- Marc VanGool – studio technician

Recording

- Recorded at Shangri-La.
- Mixed at MixStar Studios (Virginia Beach, Virginia)
- Mastered at Sterling Sound (New York City)

== Charts ==
=== Weekly charts ===
Chart (2025–2026)	Peak position
Argentina Hot 100 (Billboard)	26
Argentina Anglo Airplay (Monitor Latino)	1
Australia (ARIA)	12
Austria (Ö3 Austria Top 40)	5
Belarus Airplay (TopHit)	1
Belgium (Ultratop 50 Flanders)	15
Belgium (Ultratop 50 Wallonia)	7
Brazil Hot 100 (Billboard)	3
Bulgaria Airplay (PROPHON)	2
Canada Hot 100 (Billboard)	12
Canada AC (Billboard)	9
Canada CHR/Top 40 (Billboard)	10
Canada Hot AC (Billboard)	13
Central America Anglo Airplay (Monitor Latino)	1
Central America + Caribbean (FONOTICA)	20
Chile Airplay (Monitor Latino)	11
CIS Airplay (TopHit)	1
Colombia Anglo Airplay (Monitor Latino)	5
Costa Rica Airplay (Monitor Latino)	7
Costa Rica Streaming (FONOTICA)	18
Croatia (Billboard)	9
Croatia International Airplay (Top lista)	1
Czech Republic Airplay (ČNS IFPI)	1
Czech Republic Singles Digital (ČNS IFPI)	2
Denmark (Tracklisten)	31
Dominican Republic Anglo Airplay (Monitor Latino)	2
Ecuador Anglo Airplay (Monitor Latino)	3
Estonia Airplay (TopHit)	1
Finland (Suomen virallinen lista)	7
France (SNEP)	13
Germany (GfK)	4
Global 200 (Billboard)	5
Greece International (IFPI)	3
Guatemala Anglo Airplay (Monitor Latino)	2
Honduras Anglo Airplay (Monitor Latino)	3
Hong Kong (Billboard)	23
Hungary (Rádiós Top 40)	1
Hungary (Single Top 40)	6
Iceland (Tónlistinn)	11
Ireland (IRMA)	6
Israel (Mako Hitlist)	39
Italy (FIMI)	28
Japan Hot 100 (Billboard)	90
Kazakhstan Airplay (TopHit)	1
Latin America Anglo Airplay (Monitor Latino)	2
Latvia Airplay (LaIPA)	1
Latvia Streaming (LaIPA)	1
Lebanon (Lebanese Top 20)	2
Lithuania (AGATA)	1
Luxembourg (Billboard)	8
Malaysia International (RIM)	18
Mexico Anglo Airplay (Monitor Latino)	3
Moldova Airplay (TopHit)	1
Netherlands (Dutch Top 40)	7
Netherlands (Single Top 100)	12
New Zealand (Recorded Music NZ)	13
Nicaragua Anglo Airplay (Monitor Latino)	1
Nigeria (TurnTable Top 100)	51
Norway (VG-lista)	6
Panama International (PRODUCE)	19
Panama Airplay (Monitor Latino)	17
Paraguay Airplay (Monitor Latino)	2
Peru Anglo Airplay (Monitor Latino)	5
Philippines (IFPI)	18
Philippines Hot 100 (Billboard Philippines)	17
Poland Airplay (OLiS)	1
Poland Streaming (OLiS)	4
Portugal (AFP)	8
Puerto Rico Airplay (Monitor Latino)	12
Romania (Billboard)	25
Russia Airplay (TopHit)	1
Russia Streaming (TopHit)	39
San Marino Airplay (SMRTV Top 50)	2
Singapore (RIAS)	4
Slovakia Airplay (ČNS IFPI)	3
Slovakia Singles Digital (ČNS IFPI)	3
South Africa Airplay (TOSAC)	6
South Korea (Circle)	134
Spain (Promusicae)	23
Sweden (Sverigetopplistan)	8
Switzerland (Schweizer Hitparade)	5
Taiwan (Billboard)	12
Ukraine Airplay (TopHit)	2
United Arab Emirates (IFPI)	15
UK Singles (Official Charts)	3
Uruguay Airplay (Monitor Latino)	5
US Billboard Hot 100	13
US Adult Contemporary (Billboard)	27
US Adult Pop Airplay (Billboard)	6
US Hot Dance/Pop Songs (Billboard)	1
US Pop Airplay (Billboard)	6
Venezuela Airplay (Record Report)	21

=== Monthly charts ===
Chart (2025)	Position
Belarus Airplay (TopHit)	1
Brazil Streaming (Pro-Música Brasil)	15
CIS Airplay (TopHit)	1
Czech Republic (Singles Digitál Top 100)	5
Estonia Airplay (TopHit)	3
Kazakhstan Airplay (TopHit)	2
Latvia Airplay (TopHit)	2
Lithuania Airplay (TopHit)	1
Moldova Airplay (TopHit)	1
Paraguay (SGP)	6
Romania Airplay (TopHit)	58
Russia Airplay (TopHit)	2
Russia Streaming (TopHit)	38
Slovakia (Rádio Top 100)	69
Slovakia (Singles Digitál Top 100)	5
South Korea (Circle)	151
Ukraine Airplay (TopHit)	4

=== Year-end charts ===
Chart (2025)	Position
Argentina Airplay (Monitor Latino)	17
Australia (ARIA)	63
Austria (Ö3 Austria Top 40)	26
Belarus Airplay (TopHit)	5
Belgium (Ultratop 50 Flanders)	39
Belgium (Ultratop 50 Wallonia)	16
Bolivia Anglo Airplay (Monitor Latino)	43
Bulgaria Airplay (PROPHON)	6
Canada (Canadian Hot 100)	40
Canada AC (Billboard)	26
Canada CHR/Top 40 (Billboard)	29
Canada Hot AC (Billboard)	29
Central America Anglo Airplay (Monitor Latino)	4
Chile Airplay (Monitor Latino)	15
CIS Airplay (TopHit)	3
Costa Rica Airplay (Monitor Latino)	70
Dominican Republic Anglo Airplay (Monitor Latino)	8
Ecuador Anglo Airplay (Monitor Latino)	8
El Salvador Anglo Airplay (Monitor Latino)	89
Estonia Airplay (TopHit)	47
France (SNEP)	66
Germany (GfK)	17
Global 200 (Billboard)	33
Guatemala Anglo Airplay (Monitor Latino)	10
Hungary (Rádiós Top 40)	9
Hungary (Single Top 40)	64
Italy (FIMI)	65
Kazakhstan Airplay (TopHit)	23
Latvia Airplay (TopHit)	23
Lithuania Airplay (TopHit)	3
Mexico Airplay (Monitor Latino)	62
Moldova Airplay (TopHit)	6
Netherlands (Dutch Top 40)	30
Netherlands (Single Top 100)	67
Nicaragua Airplay (Monitor Latino)	70
Panama Airplay (Monitor Latino)	70
Paraguay Airplay (Monitor Latino)	33
Peru Anglo Airplay (Monitor Latino)	17
Poland (Polish Airplay Top 100)	12
Poland (Polish Streaming Top 100)	34
Puerto Rico Airplay (Monitor Latino)	52
Romania Airplay (TopHit)	185
Russia Airplay (TopHit)	30
Russia Streaming (TopHit)	119
Sweden (Sverigetopplistan)	57
Switzerland (Schweizer Hitparade)	42
Ukraine Airplay (FDR)	17
UK Singles (Official Charts)	46
Uruguay Airplay (Monitor Latino)	21
US Billboard Hot 100	56
US Adult Pop Airplay (Billboard)	23
US Hot Dance/Pop Songs (Billboard)	1
US Pop Airplay (Billboard)	23
Venezuela Anglo Airplay (Monitor Latino)	16

=== Decade-end charts ===
20s Decade-end chart performance
Chart (2025–2026)	Position
Russia Streaming (TopHit)	180

== Certifications ==
Certifications
Region	Certification	Certified units/sales
Australia (ARIA)	2× Platinum	140,000^{‡}
Austria (IFPI Austria)	Platinum	30,000^{‡}
Belgium (BRMA)	Platinum	40,000^{‡}
Brazil (Pro-Música Brasil)	3× Diamond	480,000^{‡}
Canada (Music Canada)	2× Platinum	160,000^{‡}
Denmark (IFPI Danmark)	Gold	45,000^{‡}
France (SNEP)	Diamond	333,333^{‡}
Germany (BVMI)	Gold	300,000^{‡}
Italy (FIMI)	Gold	100,000^{‡}
New Zealand (RMNZ)	Platinum	30,000^{‡}
Poland (ZPAV)	Platinum	125,000^{‡}
Portugal (AFP)	Platinum	10,000^{‡}
Spain (Promusicae)	Platinum	100,000^{‡}
Switzerland (IFPI Switzerland)	Platinum	30,000^{‡}
United Kingdom (BPI)	Platinum	600,000^{‡}
Streaming
Central America (CFC)	Gold	3,500,000^{†}
Czech Republic (ČNS IFPI)	Platinum	5,000,000^{†}
Greece (IFPI Greece)	Platinum	2,000,000^{†}
Slovakia (ČNS IFPI)	Platinum	1,700,000^{†}
Sweden (GLF)	Gold	6,000,000^{†}
^{‡} Sales+streaming figures based on certification alone.^{†} Streaming-only figures based on certification alone.

== Release history ==
Region	Date	Format(s)	Version	Label	Ref.
Various	February 3, 2025	Digital download; streaming	Original	Interscope	
Italy	February 3, 2025	Radio airplay	Original	Universal	
United States	February 11, 2025	Contemporary hit radio	Original	Interscope	
Various	April 12, 2025	Digital download; streaming	Gesaffelstein remix	Interscope	
