= Spellbound (Siouxsie and the Banshees song) =

Single by Siouxsie and the Banshees

from the album Juju
- B-side: "Follow the Sun", "Slap Dash Snap"
- Released: 22 May 1981
- Recorded: 1981
- Genre: Post-punk; gothic rock; neo-psychedelia
- Length: 3:18
- Label: Polydor
- Songwriters: Susan Ballion, Peter Edward Clarke, John McGeoch and Steven Severin
- Producers: Nigel Gray; Siouxsie and the Banshees

Siouxsie and the Banshees singles chronology
"Israel" (1980)	"Spellbound" (1981)	"Arabian Knights" (1981)

Music video
- "Spellbound" on YouTube

"Spellbound" is a song by English rock band Siouxsie and the Banshees. The group wrote it and co-produced it with Nigel Gray. It was released in 1981 by record label Polydor as the first single from the band's fourth studio album, Juju.

Prior to recording the song, the band toured the UK in February 1981 to premiere new material composed with guitarist John McGeoch. When reviewing this era, Barney Hoskyns of NME described "Spellbound" as a "glorious electric storm," further adding, "Siouxsie and the Banshees are one of the great British bands of all time."

== Release ==
"Spellbound" was released by Polydor on 22 May 1981. The single peaked at number 22 on the UK Singles Chart in 1981. It also reached 64 on the U.S. National Disco Action Top 80 chart.

The 12" extended version of the song appeared on the 2006 remastered version of Juju.

== Reception and legacy ==
In their contemporary review, Melody Maker praised the single, calling it "exhilarating." The Guardian retrospectively hailed it as a "pop marvel."

In 2006, Mojo honoured McGeoch by rating him in their list of "100 Greatest Guitarists of All Time" for his work on "Spellbound." Johnny Marr of the Smiths stated on BBC Radio 2 in February 2008 that he rated guitarist John McGeoch highly for his work on "Spellbound": "It's so clever. He's got this really good picky thing going on which is very un-rock'n'roll, and this actual tune he's playing is really quite mysterious."

The song featured in the end credits of the finale of the 4th season of Stranger Things, "The Piggyback," and the end credits of the season 4 episode of True Blood, "Spellbound." English pop group Duran Duran covered the song on their 2023 album Danse Macabre. Lady Gaga borrowed the song during a part of her 2025 single "Abracadabra."

== Personnel ==
- Siouxsie Sioux – vocals
- Steven Severin – bass
- John McGeoch – guitar
- Budgie – drums and percussion

== Track listing ==
7"

Side A
No.	Title	Length
1.	"Spellbound"	3:19

Side B
No.	Title	Length
1.	"Follow the Sun"	2:49

12"

Side A
No.	Title	Length
1.	"Spellbound (Extended)"	4:40

Side B
No.	Title	Length
1.	"Follow the Sun"	2:49
2.	"Slap Dash Snap"	3:42

== Charts ==
Chart (1981)	Peak position
New Zealand (Recorded Music NZ)	47
UK Single Chart	22
US National Disco Action Top 80	64
