= Play (Magazine album) =

Live album by Magazine
- Released: December 1980; April 1981 (US); June 2009 (Play+)
- Recorded: Melbourne Festival Hall, 6 September 1980; Manchester Lesser Free Trade Hall, 21 July 1978 (Play+)
- Genre: Post-punk
- Length: 42:59; 90:25 (Play+)
- Labels: Virgin, I.R.S. (US)
- Producers: Magazine, John Brand

Magazine chronology
The Correct Use of Soap (1980)	Play (1980)	Magic, Murder and the Weather (1981)

Play is the first live album by English post-punk/new wave band Magazine. It was released in December 1980 by Virgin Records (International) and in April 1981 by I.R.S. Records (US). It peaked at No. 69 on the UK Album Chart. It was Magazine's sixth 1980 release.

== Content ==
The live album consisted of a recording of the group's performance at Melbourne Festival Hall in Australia on 6 September 1980. The performance was part of a world tour in support of the group's third studio album, The Correct Use of Soap, released earlier that year. The majority of the album is composed of songs from the first and third studio albums. The original album is notable for including a performance of the B-side "Twenty Years Ago", while omitting the group's best-known song, "Shot by Both Sides", which was cut from the original album release along with gig opener "Feed the Enemy".

== Personnel ==
The short-lived line-up of Magazine that performed Play had formed due to the departure of founding member and guitarist John McGeoch. In his place was ex-Ultravox guitarist Robin Simon. Simon left the group on completion of the tour and was in turn replaced by Ben Mandelson for Magazine's fourth studio album. Simon's recording history with the group is limited to Play and tracks from another Australian gig on the 2009 compilation Live and Intermittent. The rest of the group consisted of Howard Devoto (vocals), Barry Adamson (bass and backing vocals), Dave Formula (keyboards) and John Doyle (drums).

== Production ==
The album was produced by Magazine and John Brand. Design was credited to Malcolm Garrett with photography by Birrer.

== Release ==
The album was originally released as an LP and cassette in December 1980. The album was subsequently released as a budget album on LP, cassette and CD in the late 1980s. A Japanese edition of the album was released in 1995 with three bonus live tracks recorded at the Russell Club in Manchester on 3 May 1980, which had been released as B-sides to "Sweetheart Contract". A remastered edition, titled Play+, was released by Virgin/EMI in 2009, augmented by the two deleted songs from the Melbourne Festival Hall gig and a bonus disc featuring a 21 July 1978 performance at Manchester Lesser Free Trade Hall. The 1978 gig featured the Real Life lineup of the group with McGeoch and original drummer Martin Jackson.

== Reception ==
Professional ratings
Review scores
Source	Rating
AllMusic	2.5/5 stars
Pitchfork Media	6.8/10

Play received mixed reviews, mainly due to the absence of "Shot by Both Sides".

== Track listing ==
=== Play (Original release) ===
Side one
No.	Title	Writer(s)	Length
1.	"Give Me Everything"	Howard Devoto	4:27
2.	"A Song From Under the Floorboards"	Devoto; Barry Adamson; John Doyle; Dave Formula; John McGeoch	4:15
3.	"Permafrost"	Devoto	4:59
4.	"The Light Pours Out of Me"	Devoto; McGeoch; Pete Shelley	4:46
5.	"Model Worker"	Devoto; Adamson; Doyle; Formula; McGeoch	2:57
Total length:			21:24

Side two
No.	Title	Writer(s)	Length
6.	"Parade"	Devoto; Formula; Adamson	6:05
7.	"Thank You (Falettinme Be Mice Elf Agin)"	Sylvester Stewart	3:49
8.	"Because You're Frightened"	Devoto; Adamson; Doyle; Formula; McGeoch	3:53
9.	"Twenty Years Ago"	Devoto; Adamson; Doyle; Formula; McGeoch	4:00
10.	"Definitive Gaze"	Devoto; McGeoch	3:48
Total length:			21:35 42:59

=== Play+ (2009 re-release) ===
Disc one - Melbourne Festival Hall, 6 September 1980
No.	Title	Writer(s)	Length
1.	"Feed the Enemy"	Devoto; Formula	4:12
2.	"Give Me Everything"	Devoto	4:27
3.	"A Song From Under The Floorboards"	Devoto; Adamson; Doyle; Formula; McGeoch	4:15
4.	"Permafrost"	Devoto	4:59
5.	"The Light Pours Out of Me"	Devoto; McGeoch; Shelley	4:46
6.	"Model Worker"	Devoto; Adamson; Doyle; Formula; McGeoch	2:57
7.	"Parade"	Devoto; Formula; Adamson	6:05
8.	"Thank You (Falettinme Be Mice Elf Agin)"	Stewart	3:49
9.	"Because You're Frightened"	Devoto; Adamson; Doyle; Formula; McGeoch	3:53
10.	"Shot by Both Sides"	Devoto; Shelley	5:19
11.	"Twenty Years Ago"	Devoto; Adamson; Doyle; Formula; McGeoch	4:00
12.	"Definitive Gaze"	Devoto; McGeoch	3:48
Total length:			52:30

Disc two - Manchester Lesser Free Trade Hall, 21 July 1978
No.	Title	Writer(s)	Length
1.	"Definitive Gaze"	Devoto; McGeoch	4:14
2.	"Touch and Go"	Devoto; McGeoch	3:17
3.	"Burst"	Devoto	4:14
4.	"The Light Pours Out of Me"	Devoto; McGeoch; Shelley	4:58
5.	"My Tulpa"	Devoto; McGeoch	5:03
6.	"Shot by Both Sides"	Devoto; Shelley	5:06
7.	"Give Me Everything"	Devoto	4:42
8.	"I Love You You Big Dummy"	Don Van Vliet	3:51
9.	"My Mind Ain't So Open"	Devoto; McGeoch	2:30
Total length:			37:55 90:25

== Personnel ==
Magazine

- Howard Devoto – vocals
- Barry Adamson – bass guitar
- Dave Formula – keyboards
- John Doyle – drums
- Robin Simon – guitar
- John McGeoch – guitar, saxophone (Play+ disc two)
- Martin Jackson – drums (Play+ disc two)

Production

- Magazine – producer
- John Brand – producer, engineer
- Paul Frindle – assistant engineer
- Pete Mew – mixing (Play+ disc two)
- Malfunctions – stage
- Birrer – photography
- Malcolm Garrett (at Assorted Images) – sleeve

== Chart positions ==
Chart (1980)	Peak position
UK Album Chart	69
