= Jerky Versions of the Dream =

Studio album by Howard Devoto
- Released: 26 July 1983 (US)
- Recorded: 1982–1983
- Genre: Avant-pop; new wave; post-punk
- Length: 42:24
- Label: Virgin (Europe); I.R.S. (US)
- Producer: Howard Devoto, Greg Walsh

Singles from Jerky Versions of the Dream
- 1. "Rainy Season" b/w "Rainforest (Variation N16)" Released: June 1983; 2. "Cold Imagination" b/w "Out of Shape with Me" Released: August 1983

Jerky Versions of the Dream is the only solo album recorded by Howard Devoto, the original singer of Buzzcocks and Magazine. It was his only studio album, which was released at the time with two singles, "Cold Imagination" and "Rainy Season", being a short-lived solo career for Devoto, who in 1986, went to form a band alongside guitarist Noko, which later was named Luxuria.

== Recording ==
The process of Devoto's solo album began, shortly after the demise of Magazine. Already frustrated by an unsatisfactory string of replacements for guitarist John McGeoch, Devoto left the group after the pre-album single to Magic, Murder and the Weather had failed to chart. Devoto started to write songs during 1982, later making a demo with guitarist Alan St. Clair and a drum machine. He also started working with his former Magazine bandmate Barry Adamson. Eventually, Devoto decided to combine the two projects and record a solo album, instead.

== Release and reception ==
Professional ratings
Review scores
Source	Rating
AllMusic	4.5/5 stars
The Rolling Stone Album Guide	2/5 stars

The album was released in United States on the I.R.S. label, on 26 July 1983.

The first single to be released from the album was "Rainy Season". The song's video was heavily rotated on MTV. On the release of the album it peaked at #57, on the UK album chart. It was eagerly anticipated and widely received by amazing reviews. A subsequent tour in Europe, the United States, and Canada was full of sold out crowds. However, the album's second single, "Cold Imagination", failed to chart as well, and Devoto's solo career was put on hold.

In contemporary reviewing, Barney Hoskyns gave it a mixed response in NME: "It burns at both ends and gets bitty and boring in the centre."

Retrospective reviews were more positive. Trouser Press said: "Full appreciation of the album requires a bit of forbearance and effort, but few artists make music this careful and intelligent." AllMusic said: "Melding frenetic industrial funk with sardonic lounge piano, the music appropriately matches Devoto's eccentric lyrical musings—offering obtuse but highly original philosophical and social commentary." In a guide to avant-pop music for The Brooklyn Rail, Paul Grimstad described Jerky Versions of the Dream as a "brittle, delicate record" and recommended "Cold Imagination".

== Track listing ==
All songs written by Howard Devoto except where noted.

No.	Title	Writer(s)	Length
1.	"Cold Imagination"		4:21
2.	"Topless"	Devoto, Dave Formula	3:47
3.	"Rainy Season"		5:06
4.	"I Admire You"		5:15
5.	"Way Out of Shape"		3:55
6.	"Some Will Pay (For What Others Pay to Avoid)"	Devoto, Formula	3:44
7.	"Waiting for a Train"		4:53
8.	"Out of Shape with Me"		4:14
9.	"Taking Over Heaven"		3:57
10.	"Seeing Is Believing"		3:19

2007 remastered edition bonus tracks
No.	Title	Writer(s)	Length
11.	"Rainy Season" (7" Single Version)		3:40
12.	"Rainforest" (Variation N16)		5:12
13.	"Cold Imagination" (Extended Version)		5:08
14.	"Cold Imagination" (BBC Radio 1 Peel Session Version)		4:33
15.	"Topless" (BBC Radio 1 Peel Session Version)	Devoto, Formula	3:39
16.	"Some Will Pay (For What Others Pay to Avoid)" (BBC Radio 1 Peel Session version)	Devoto, Formula	3:52

== Personnel ==
- Howard Devoto - lead vocals, keyboards, piano, guitar, producer, arrangement
- Dave Formula - keyboards, piano, arrangement
- Alan St. Clair - guitar
- Leroy James - additional guitar on "I Admire You"
- Martin Heath - bass guitar
- Dave Martin - bass guitar on "Topless"
- Barry Adamson - bass guitar on "Out of Shape With Me" and "Seeing is Believing"
- Pat Ahern - drums, percussion
- Gary Barnacle - saxophone on "Some Will Pay (For What Others Pay to Avoid)" and "Waiting For a Train"
- Andy Diagram - French horn and trumpet on "Out of Shape With Me"
- Penelope Houston - second vocals on "Taking Over Heaven"
- Pamela Kifer - backing vocals
- Laura Teresa - backing vocals

Technical

- Malcolm Garrett, Peter Saville Associates - sleeve design
- Trevor Key - photography

== Chart positions ==
Album

Chart (1983)	Peak position
UK Album Chart	57

Singles

Single	Chart (1983)	Position
"Rainy Season"	UK Singles Chart	97
