= Magic, Murder and the Weather =

Studio album by Magazine
- Released: June 1981
- Recorded: 1981
- Studios: Trident Studios, London
- Genre: New wave・post-punk
- Length: 39:52
- Label: Virgin・I.R.S. (US)

Magazine chronology
Play (1980)	Magic, Murder and the Weather (1981)	No Thyself (2011)

Singles from Magic, Murder and the Weather
- 1. "About the Weather" Released: July 1981

Magic, Murder and the Weather is the fourth studio album by English post-punk band Magazine, and their final album until the band's reformation in 2009. It was released in June 1981 by record label Virgin. One single, "About the Weather", was released from the album.

== Writing ==
Unlike the group's previous album, The Correct Use of Soap, the writing credits for Magic, Murder and the Weather were not shared equally. Quite a lot of the music was written by keyboardist Dave Formula and only the first three songs of side two of the LP were credited to all five members. Consistent with all Magazine's albums, the lyrics were written by Howard Devoto.

== Recording ==
Magic, Murder and the Weather was recorded at Trident Studios, London in early 1981 with John Brand recording and engineering and The Correct Use of Soap producer Martin Hannett credited for mixing. A producer is not credited. Hannett and the band mixed the album at Strawberry Studios in Stockport with Chris Nagel assisting.

The classic lineup of the band had ended when guitarist and founding member John McGeoch had departed in mid-1980 to join Siouxsie and the Banshees. Robin Simon played guitar for Magazine's 1980 world tour, but left the group soon after. Replacing Simon was Devoto’s friend Ben Mandelson.

The lineup that recorded the album was as Devoto (vocals and guitar), Barry Adamson (bass), Formula (keyboards), John Doyle (drums) and Mandelson (guitar and violin). Laura Teresa and Ray Shell contributed backing vocals.

== Album cover ==
The original artwork was designed by Malcolm Garret with photography by Bruce Gilden.

== Release ==
The album was originally released on vinyl and cassette in June 1981. The album peaked at No. 39 on the UK Album Chart. "About the Weather" was released as a single the following month.

The album was remastered by Virgin/EMI in 2007 along with the other three of the band's first four studio albums, and included two bonus tracks and liner notes by Kieron Tyler.

== Reception ==
Professional ratings
Review scores
Source	Rating
AllMusic	2/5 stars
Smash Hits	7/10 stars
Stylus Magazine	C−

Upon its release, Smash Hits reviewer Geoffrey Deane gave the album a 7 out of 10 rating, calling it "Not their best work, but a suitable epitaph never the less."

Retrospectively, Magic, Murder and the Weather has generally been poorly received by critics. AllMusic's Stephen Thomas Erlewine wrote that the album "finds Dave Formula's washes of cold, brittle keyboards dominating the bitter and cynical music. Occasionally, Howard Devoto's weary lyrics surface through the icy mix, but it's clear that Devoto and Magazine have both had better days. It's not a graceful way to bow out, but the album has enough strong moments to prevent it from being an embarrassment as well." Peter Parrish of Stylus wrote: "Devoto sounds as though his heart is no longer in it. The vibrancy found on The Correct Use of Soap has all but ebbed away and much of the record is bogged down by leaden, uninspired sounds that would have been unimaginable on earlier releases."

== Breakup and live performances ==
Prior to the group's reformation in 2009 and the release of No Thyself in 2011, Magic, Murder and the Weather was the group's final studio album. Months before the album's release, Devoto, disillusioned with the conditions in the band (McGeoch quitting, and failing to get a true replacement for him), decided to quit Magazine. After the release, Magazine decided to dissolve because they could not imagine a "post-Devoto" lineup.

Despite the breakup, the members continued to work together on each other's projects throughout the 1980s and into the 1990s. Most notably: Doyle and McGeoch worked together in the short-lived group The Armoury Show, Formula and Adamson continued to work with Visage and Formula worked on Devoto's 1983 solo album Jerky Versions of the Dream.

Due to Devoto's departure and Magazine's subsequent disbanding, the album was never showcased live until the band reformed. Tracks from Magic, Murder and the Weather were performed live beginning with Magazine's 2009 tours. Devoto explained that rather than playing new material during the shows, it was an opportunity to play music from the 1981 album: "We've never played any of [Magic, Murder and the Weather] live before, and you know, we reckoned it was just enough to stick with the old stuff. But once we had gone through that first year, I wanted a bit of new material to freshen up the set, as it were, both for ourselves and the audience." Live recordings of "The Honeymoon Killers" and "This Poison" appeared on the DVD/CD set Real Life + Thereafter, released in 2009.

== Track listing ==
All lyrics are written by Howard Devoto.

Side A
No.	Title	Music	Length
1.	"About the Weather"	Dave Formula	4:06
2.	"So Lucky"	Formula	4:11
3.	"The Honeymoon Killers"	Barry Adamson; Ben Mandelson	3:39
4.	"Vigilance"	Devoto; Adamson	5:15
5.	"Come Alive"	Formula	3:43
Total length:			20:54

Side B
No.	Title	Music	Length
6.	"The Great Man's Secrets"	Devoto; Adamson; John Doyle; Formula; Mandelson	4:57
7.	"This Poison"	Devoto; Adamson; Doyle; Formula; Mandelson	4:20
8.	"Naked Eye"	Devoto; Adamson; Doyle; Formula; Mandelson	3:30
9.	"Suburban Rhonda"	Devoto; Formula	3:32
10.	"The Garden"	Formula	2:39
Total length:			18:58 39:52

2007 remastered edition bonus tracks
No.	Title	Music	Length
11.	"In the Dark"	Adamson	2:43
12.	"The Operative"	Devoto; Doyle	2:45
Total length:			5:28 45:20

== Personnel ==
Magazine

- Howard Devoto – vocals, guitar
- Barry Adamson – bass guitar
- Dave Formula – keyboards
- John Doyle – drums
- Ben Mandelson – guitar, violin

Additional personnel

- Laura Teresa – backing vocals
- Ray Shell – backing vocals

Technical

- John Brand – engineering, recording
- Martin Hannett – mixing
- Chris Nagle – mixing assistance
- Malcolm Garrett (courtesy of Assorted Images) – sleeve design
- Bruce Gilden – sleeve photography

== Charts ==
Chart (1981)	Peak position
UK Album Chart	39
Australia (Kent Music Report)	95
