= Cut Out Shapes =

Cut Out Shapes may refer to:

- Cut Out Shapes (band), English alternative rock band
- Cut Out Shapes (song), a song by English post-punk band Magazine
