= John Doyle (drummer) =

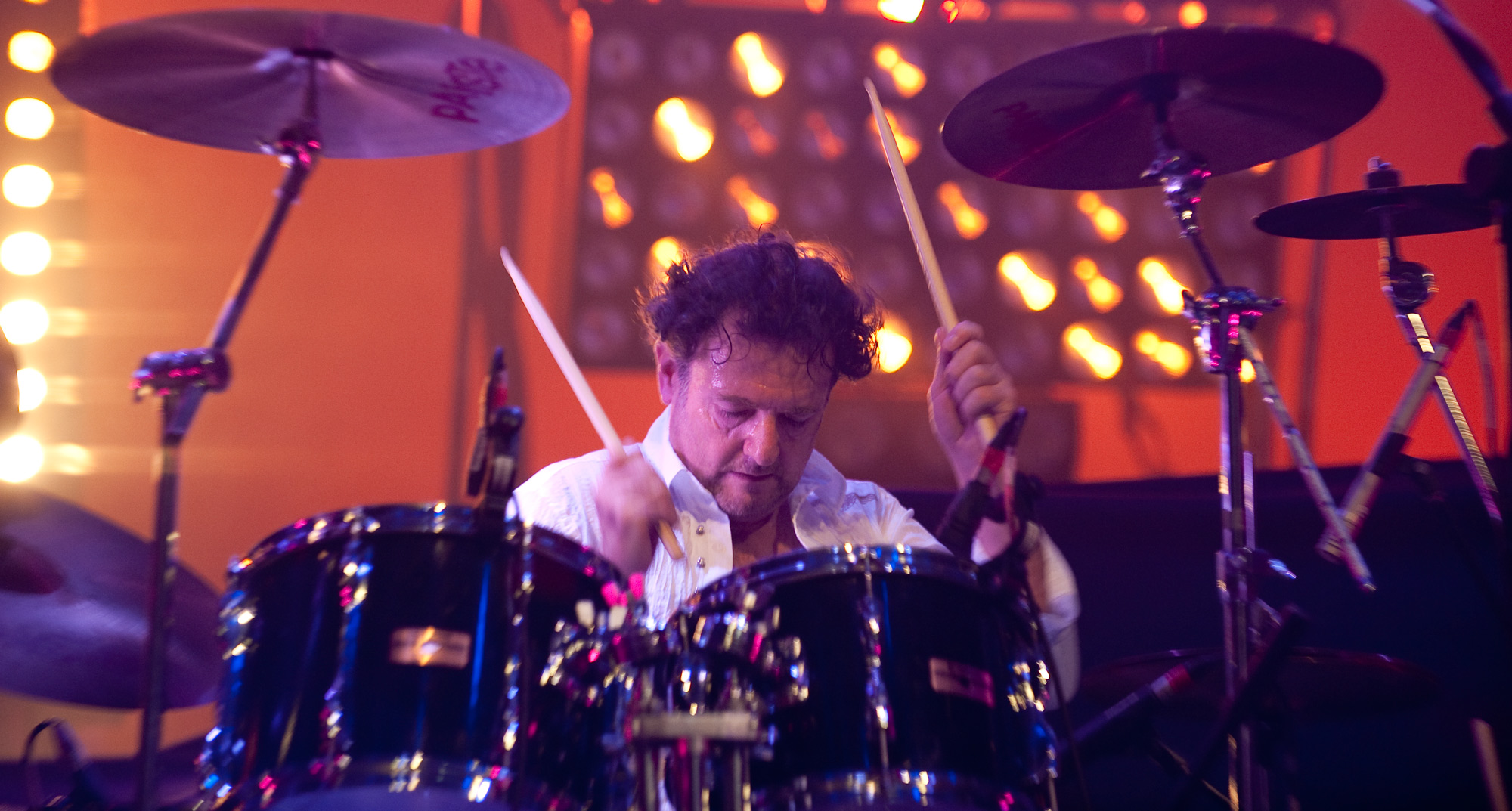

Background information
- Born: 6 May 1959 (age 67); Manchester, England
- Genres: Pub rock, punk rock, post-punk, new wave, synthpop, alternative rock
- Occupations: Drummer, artworker
- Instruments: Drums
- Years active: 1978–2011
- Labels: Polydor, Geffen
- Website: Myspace: Doyley

John Doyle (born 6 May 1959) is a retired English drummer, who was a member of new wave bands like Magazine and The Armoury Show. He reunited with Magazine for a tour in February 2009.

== Biography ==
While at William Hulme's Grammar School, with friends on the stage staff formed a band. He then played with various local Manchester bands, including Idiot Rouge, alongside Neil Cossar, later of power pop band The Cheaters, and Nick Simpson, later frontman of 23 Jewels.

In the last gig with Idiot Rouge, at Manchester Polytechnic, guitarist John McGeoch, who was attending, asked Doyle if he wanted to audition for his band, Magazine. Doyle joined the band in October 1978, replaced Speedometors' Paul Spencer who had completed their tour across Europe, beginning in Munich, during their Real Life debut album tour. Doyle played on Secondhand Daylight, The Correct Use of Soap, the live album Play and Magic, Murder and the Weather. In 1981, he collaborated with Ken Lockie, playing drums on some tracks of The Impossible album. He also collaborated with Armande Atti and Akira Mitake.

In 1983, he joined The Armoury Show, working again with John McGeoch, who left Magazine in 1980. The band was commercially unsuccessful, and Doyle left them in 1986 to collaborate with Pete Shelley, until 1987. He played percussion on one track on Barry Adamson's debut album Moss Side Story (1988).

Toured with Shelley in 1985–6. Had a family and eventually became Artworker working at various advertising agencies.

He also collaborated with Dave Formula, for his solo album, Satellite Sweetheart, released on 15 February 2010.

In 2009, he reunited with Magazine for a number of UK and European concerts, radio and TV performances.

== Discography ==
With Magazine:

- "Give Me Everything" single (Virgin, 1978)
- Secondhand Daylight album (Virgin, 1979)
- The Correct Use of Soap album (Virgin, 1980)
- Play live album (Virgin, 1980)
- Magic, Murder and the Weather album (Virgin, 1981)
- No Thyself (Wire-Sound, 2011)

With Ken Lockie:

- The Impossible album (1981)

With The Armoury Show:

- Castles in Spain (1984)
- Waiting for the Floods (1985)

With Barry Adamson:

- Moss Side Story (percussion) (1988)

== See also ==
- John McGeoch
- The Armoury Show
- Richard Jobson
- Russell Webb
- Public Image Ltd.
- Siouxsie and the Banshees
- Skids
- Slik
