= The Correct Use of Soap =

Studio album by Magazine
- Released: May 1980
- Recorded: 1980
- Genres: Post-punk; pop
- Length: 39:26
- Label: Virgin
- Producer: Martin Hannett

Magazine chronology
Secondhand Daylight (1979)	The Correct Use of Soap (1980)	Play (1980)

Singles from The Correct Use of Soap
- 1. "A Song from Under the Floorboards" Released: January 1980; 2. "Thank You (Falettinme Be Mice Elf Agin)" Released: March 1980; 3. "Sweetheart Contract" Released: July 1980

Professional ratings
Review scores
Source	Rating
AllMusic	4.5/5 stars
The Irish Times	4/5 stars
Q	4/5 stars
Record Mirror	4/5 stars
Smash Hits	5/10
Stylus Magazine	A
Uncut	4/5 stars

The Correct Use of Soap is the third studio album by English post-punk band Magazine, released by Virgin Records in 1980. It contains some of Magazine's best-known and most popular songs, including the singles "A Song from Under the Floorboards" and "Sweetheart Contract" and their cover of Sly and the Family Stone's "Thank You (Falettinme Be Mice Elf Agin)". A different version of the album, entitled An Alternative Use of Soap, was released in Canada in 1980 by then-distributor Polygram Records.

It was Magazine's last album with original guitarist John McGeoch, who left the band after the release of the album and joined Siouxsie and the Banshees.

== Content ==
Some of the songs marked a return of sorts to the punkier riffs and faster rhythms of Real Life, after their second album, Secondhand Daylight.

Two songs on the album make reference to elements of works by Fyodor Dostoyevsky, namely "Philadelphia" (referring to Raskolnikov, the main character in Crime and Punishment) and "A Song from Under the Floorboards" (based on Notes from Underground).

The record sleeve design for this album, as for most other Magazine albums and singles, was by Malcolm Garrett.

== Release ==
The Correct Use of Soap peaked at number 28 on the UK Albums Chart. The tracks "A Song from Under the Floorboards", "Thank You (Falettinme Be Mice Elf Agin)" and "Sweetheart Contract" were released as singles. "Thank You" peaked at number 42 on the Billboard Dance Music/Club Play Singles chart in the United States, while "Sweetheart Contract" peaked at number 54 on the UK Singles Chart.

Following the release of the album, guitarist John McGeoch left Magazine and joined Siouxsie and the Banshees. McGeoch also played with Visage, formed by his Magazine bandmates Dave Formula and Barry Adamson. He was replaced by Robin Simon (ex-Ultravox, later with Ajantamusic) on the world tour promoting the album.

"A Song from Under the Floorboards" was featured on Rhino's 2004 box set Left of the Dial: Dispatches from the '80s Underground and has been covered many times in concert by fellow Mancunian Morrissey. It was also covered by Australian band My Friend the Chocolate Cake on their ARIA Music Award-winning album Brood (1994), and by Simple Minds on the 2CD edition of their 2009 album Graffiti Soul.

== Critical reception ==
Upon its release, the album received mixed reviews in the British music press. Record Mirror gave it a 4 out of 5 rating, while Smash Hits reviewer Red Starr wrote: "Despite the fine musicianship doing its best to sound busy and imposing, this thoroughly forgettable set lacks depth, conviction and, most of all, decent songs!" NME ranked it 14 on their "Albums Of The Year" list.

== Live performances ==
On 1 September 2009, Magazine performed the original album in its entirety during the first half of their show at the Royal Festival Hall in London.

== Track listing ==
All lyrics are written by Howard Devoto and all music is composed by Magazine (Barry Adamson, Howard Devoto, John Doyle, Dave Formula and John McGeoch), except where noted.

=== The Correct Use of Soap ===
Side one
No.	Title	Length
1.	"Because You're Frightened"	3:54
2.	"Model Worker"	2:51
3.	"I'm a Party"	3:01
4.	"You Never Knew Me"	5:23
5.	"Philadelphia"	3:54
Total length:		19:03

Side two
No.	Title	Writer(s)	Length
6.	"I Want to Burn Again"		5:16
7.	"Thank You (Falettinme Be Mice Elf Agin)"	Sylvester Stewart	3:38
8.	"Sweetheart Contract"		3:18
9.	"Stuck"		4:04
10.	"A Song from Under the Floorboards"		4:07
Total length:			20:23 39:26

2007 remastered edition bonus tracks
No.	Title	Writer(s)	Length
11.	"Twenty Years Ago"		3:03
12.	"The Book"		2:22
13.	"Upside Down"		3:47
14.	"The Light Pours Out of Me" (single version)	Devoto; McGeoch; Pete Shelley	3:28
Total length:			12:40 52:06

=== An Alternative Use of Soap ===
Side one
No.	Title	Writer(s)	Length
1.	"Because You're Frightened"		3:54
2.	"The Light Pours Out of Me"	Devoto; McGeoch; Shelley	3:28
3.	"You Never Knew Me"		5:23
4.	"Upside Down"		3:48
5.	"Sweetheart Contract"		3:18
Total length:			19:51

Side two
No.	Title	Writer(s)	Length
6.	"A Song from Under the Floorboards"		4:07
7.	"Philadelphia"		3:54
8.	"I Want to Burn Again"		5:16
9.	"Stuck"		4:04
10.	"Thank You (Fallentinme Be Mice Elf Again)"	Stewart	3:48
Total length:			21:09 41:00

== Personnel ==
Credits are adapted from the album's liner notes.

Magazine

- Howard Devoto – vocals
- John McGeoch – guitar, backing vocals
- Barry Adamson – bass guitar, backing vocals
- Dave Formula – keyboards
- John Doyle – drums, percussion

Additional musicians

- Laura Teresa – additional backing vocals

Technical

- Martin Hannett – production
- Malcolm Garrett – artwork

== Charts ==
Chart (1980)	Peak position
Australian Albums (Kent Music Report)	98
New Zealand Albums (RMNZ)	37
UK Albums (Official Charts)	28
