= No Thyself =

Studio album by Magazine
- Released: 24 October 2011
- Recorded: Red Bird, Apollo Control
- Genre: Post-punk
- Length: 45:01 (49:08 with bonus)
- Label: Wire-Sound

Magazine chronology
| Magic, Murder and the Weather (1981) | No Thyself (2011) |

Singles from No Thyself
- 1. "Hello Mister Curtis (With Apologies)" Released: 10 December 2011

No Thyself is the fifth and final studio album by the band Magazine, and the first since their 2009 reformation. It was released on the Wire-Sound label on 24 October 2011, about 30 years after the release of their previous studio album, Magic, Murder and the Weather.

Bass guitarist Barry Adamson, while still remaining a member of Magazine, did not participate in the making of No Thyself due to prior obligations in film music. Guitarist John McGeoch had died in 2004. Both musicians were important in previous lineups. Pete Shelley, who had founded Buzzcocks with Magazine singer Howard Devoto, co-writing early Buzzcocks material and one Magazine song together, contributed to the writing of the first track. The album cover features the painting The Misshapen Polyp Floated on the Shores, a Sort of Smiling and Hideous Cyclops by French artist Odilon Redon.

== Reception ==
Professional ratings
Review scores
| Source | Rating |
|---|---|
| BBC | 9/10 stars |
| The Guardian | 4/5 stars |
| Mojo | 8/10 stars |

The BBC rated the album 9 out of 10, saying: "The surprise excellence of the songs and the music makes this the long-overdue fourth great Magazine album. Thirty years ago, Howard Devoto sang of wanting to burn again. And here he is, doing exactly that."

The Guardian gave it 8 of 10 and said: "No Thyself could be the fourth album they should have made instead of 1981's Magic, Murder and the Weather, which badly missed departed John McGeoch. Here, guitarist Noko and bassist John "Stan" White (replacing Barry Adamson, who had film commitments) help recapture the sonic blueprint laid down on the first three classic albums".

Mojo (in the print edition only) gave it 8 of 10 and said: "In 10 crisp, playful songs restores the exalted standards of the band's legend" (referring to the standard 10-track edition).

== Track listing ==
All lyrics by Howard Devoto, except where indicated. All music by Devoto, Doyle, Formula and Noko, except where indicated.

| No. | Title | Writer(s) | Length |
|---|---|---|---|
| 1. | "Do the Meaning" | Devoto (music and lyrics), Doyle, Formula, Noko, Pete Shelley (music and lyrics) | 4:28 |
| 2. | "Other Thematic Material" | | 4:08 |
| 3. | "The Worst of Progress...." | | 4:59 |
| 4. | "Hello Mister Curtis (With Apologies)" | | 4:17 |
| 5. | "Physics" | | 4:11 |
| 6. | "Happening in English" | | 4:11 |
| 7. | "Holy Dotage" | | 4:20 |
| 8. | "Of Course Howard (1979)" | | 4:44 |
| 9. | "Final Analysis Waltz" | | 4:51 |
| 10. | "The Burden of a Song" | | 4:33 |
| 11. | "Blisterpack Blues" (bonus track) | | 4:27 |

=== Variants ===
- WIRED 18 – 11-track special edition with bonus track "Blisterpack Blues"
- WIRED 19 – standard 10-track version
- WIRED 22 – 10-track 12" vinyl LP version
- WIRED 17 – limited edition 10" vinyl single "Hello Mister Curtis (With Apologies)" backed with "Holy Dotage"

== Personnel ==
- Howard Devoto – vocals
- John Doyle – drums
- Dave Formula – keyboards
- Norman Fisher-Jones (also known as Noko) – guitar and backing vocals
- Jonathan "Stan" White – bass guitar and backing vocals
- Christine Hanson – cello and strings on "Final Analysis Waltz"
- Rosalie Cunningham – backing vocals
- Mixed by Mike Nielsen at Strongroom Studio3, London

== Chart positions ==
| Chart (2011) | Peak position |
|---|---|
| UK Album Chart | 167 |
