= Cut Out Shapes (band) =

Cut Out Shapes are uniquely two different bands inspired by the Magazine song, "Cut Out Shapes".

== About ==
Their names are inspired by the Magazine song, "Cut Out Shapes".

- Cut Out Shapes-(USA) =Hailing from Northern California, Formed August 1992. Performing gigs, recorded countless garage tapes, 2003 self-titled Compact Disc release. https://www.reverbnation.com/cutoutshapes
- Cut Out Shapes- (UK) =Hailing from Leeds.one EP, three singles, and one album https://www.facebook.com/cutoutshapes/
- since forming in November 2009. The (UK) band have been performing gigs around Leeds and Manchester ever since.
- C.O.S (UK) supported Chase and Status at Party on The Amp 2011 in May of that year. On 17 September 2011, the band's record label, DI Records put on an alternative rock night at The Library Pub, Leeds, including Cut Out Shapes, Pet Accessories, and The Deratas

Cut Out Shapes-(USA-)-Members

- Andrew U'ren – Percussion, Vocals
- Carlos Aloy - Vocals, Lead Guitar
- Chris Grokenberger Vocals, Bass
- Scott Britton - Vocals, Guitar
- Kelly Hess- Keyboards
- In 2003, three of the shapes had released a self-titled disc of selected songs and recordings from early years.
- Presently four members are tweaking their eclectic alternative prog pop sounds.

Cut Out Shapes(USA)2003 Track listing

1. Say You Need
2. Idiot box
3. General
4. Not An Escape
5. Blighter
6. Ripe
7. stupid little crutch - Fan Video
8. TrAsHmAn
9. underground
10. Conflicts Collide
11. so far so good -Fan Video
12. strangest dream

Cut Out Shapes (UK) members

- Chris Wood – lead guitar (UK)
- Chris Ward – vocals, bass (UK)
- Toni – keyboards (tracks 1 and 2) (UK)
- Will Jackson – engineering
- Cut out shapes – mixing
- Cut Out Shapes (UK) Released on CD and digital download in November 2009, Sea of Tranquility is a three-track EP. Its lead track, Sea of Tranquility could be described as reminiscent of Queens of the Stone Age

Sea of Tranquility EP track listing

1. Sea of Tranquility
2. Desert Song
3. Past Lives

Personnel

- Chris Wood – lead guitar (UK)
- Chris Ward – vocals, bass (UK)
- Toni – keyboards (tracks 1 and 2) (UK)
- Will Jackson – engineering
- Cut out shapes – mixing

Cut Out Shapes (Debut Album) (UK)

Released on CD and digital download on 21 April 2014, Cut Out Shapes is the self-titled debut album. Its lead tracks released for radio and digital download are Backwards Philosophy (January 2014), When the river runs dry (February 2014), Walking on Water (March 2014), Celestial Secrecy (April 2014), Nightmare (January 2012), and Never Change (Summer 2011)

Track listing

1. Celestial Secrecy
2. Ecstasy
3. Digital Dreams
4. Backwards Philosophy
5. Walking On Water
6. Open Your Eyes
7. Nightmare
8. Never Change
9. Let It Go
10. When The River Runs Dry
11. Executive Decision
12. Past Lives

Personnel

- Chris Wood – lead guitar, bass
- Chris Ward – vocals, bass
- Connor, Alex, Jason – drums
- Toni, Chris – keyboards
- Simon Humphrey, Alistair Groves – engineering
- Cut out shapes – mixing
