= ShelleyDevoto =

ShelleyDevoto was a musical collaboration between singer Howard Devoto and singer/guitarist Pete Shelley. Both were founding members of the Buzzcocks in the mid-1970s, and ShelleyDevoto was their first collaboration in over two decades.

The album Buzzkunst was released in 2001 on Cooking Vinyl, along with one single/video, "Til the Stars in His Eyes Are Dead". The album was recorded, journalist Paul Lester told readers of the London Guardian, 'in the duo's homes in London using basic technology.' Reviews were mixed but mostly positive, with a 70% ranking on Metacritic.
