= Ben Mandelson =

British musician

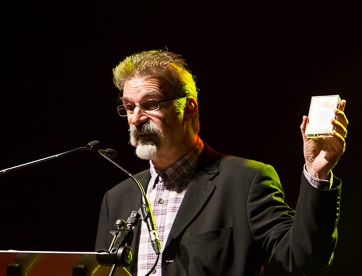
Mandelson at WOMEX in Cardiff, October 2013

Ben Mandelson (born 6 October 1953, in Everton, Liverpool in England) is an English musician. In addition he is a manager and producer.

== Punk and new wave years ==
In the mid-1970s, Mandelson was a student at Bolton Institute of Technology (now the University of Bolton) in Bolton, Manchester where he met Howard Devoto, future Buzzcocks and Magazine frontman. When punk emerged, Mandelson formed a band called Amazorblades, being the group's guitarist.

In 1981, he joined Devoto's band Magazine, replacing Robin Simon (who previously replaced a solid member of the band, John McGeoch) and playing on their last album Magic, Murder and the Weather. Mandelson is Jewish.

== World music years ==
In 1982 as Hijaz Mustapha, he began playing with Lu Edmonds a.k.a. Uncle Patrel Mustapha Bin Mustapha leading to the formation of 3 Mustaphas 3, a band which was active throughout the 1980s and into the 1990s. In 1982, Mandelson also worked with dub and roots reggae Black Uhuru sound engineer, Godwin Logie and with ex Public Image Ltd bassist, Jah Wobble.

Mandelson was founding director, in 1994, of the world music fair WOMEX in Cardiff, Wales. In 2009, together with Justin Adams and again with Lu Edmonds, Mandelson formed the band Les Triaboliques and released the debut album Rivermudtwilight.
