= WOMEX =

International networking platform for the world music industry

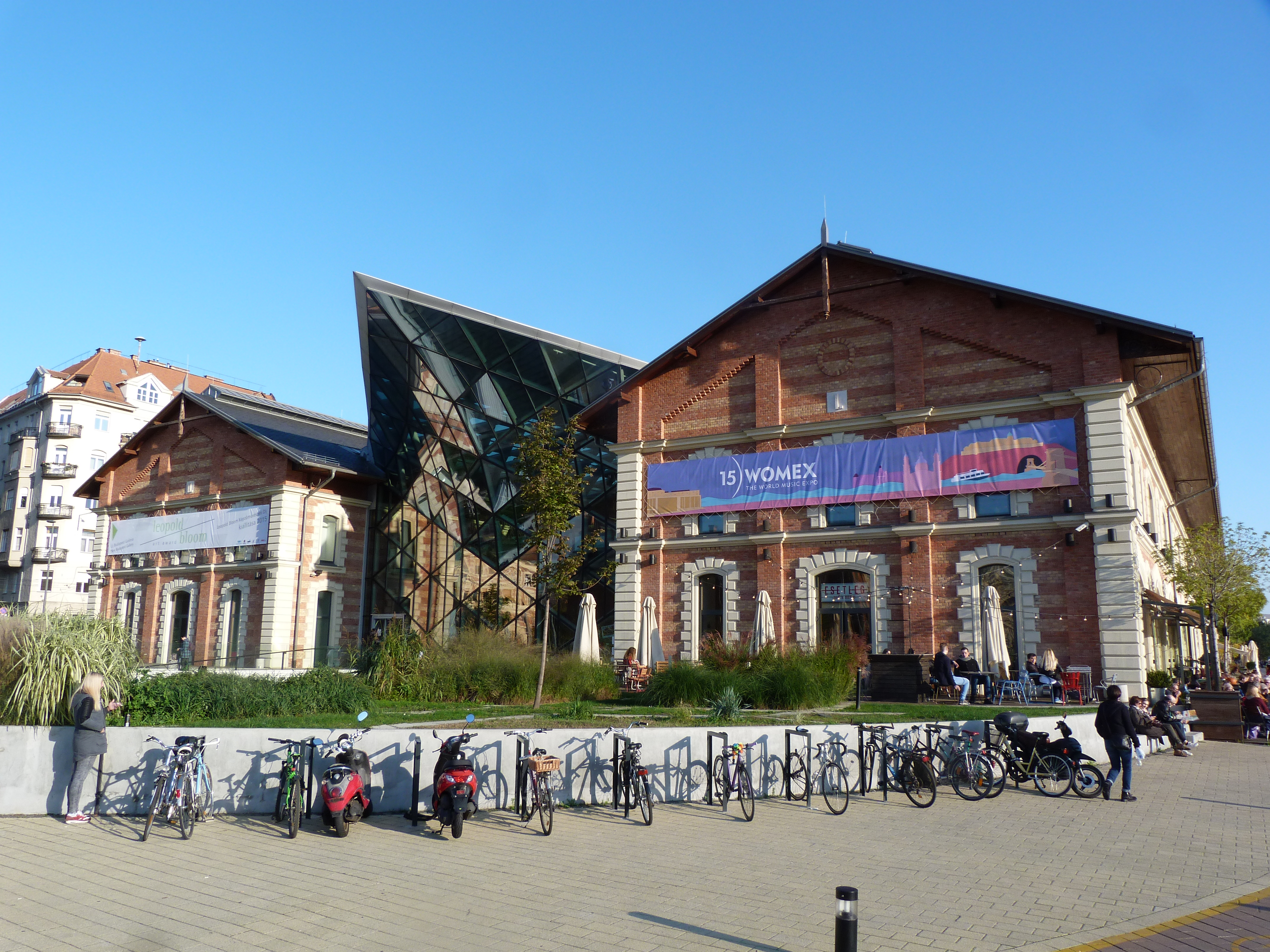
WOMEX 15, 2015

WOMEX (short for Worldwide Music Expo) is an international world music support and development project based in Berlin, whose main event is an exposition held annually in different locations throughout Europe. It integrates a trade fair, showcases, conferences, film screenings, networking sessions, and awards. Musicians and their labels have the possibility to make contacts for international touring and album distribution.

WOMEX was founded in 1994 by Christoph Borkowsky, and Ben Mandelson.

== Event ==
WOMEX runs during October every year, and in many cases, during the last October weekend. On-site registration begins on Wednesday, when the opening ceremony is held. Conference attendees can visit the opening event, the conference program, the trade fair, the showcases on the evenings of Thursday, Friday and Saturday and the WOMEX awards on Sunday, the last day of the event. Although WOMEX is primarily intended for professionals and trade visitors within the world music scene, locals and tourists can buy tickets for most of the evening showcases. In 2020, due to COVID-19, WOMEX took place digitally for the very first time.

== Locations ==
The locations of WOMEX events are listed below:

- Berlin, Germany (1994, 1999, 2000)
- Brussels, Belgium (1995)
- Marseille, France (1997)
- Stockholm, Sweden (1998)
- Rotterdam, Netherlands (2001)
- Essen, Germany (2002, 2004)
- Newcastle upon Tyne, England (2005)
- Seville, Spain (2003, 2006, 2007, 2008)
- Copenhagen, Denmark (2009, 2010, 2011)
- Thessaloniki, Greece (2012)
- Cardiff, Wales (2013)
- Santiago de Compostela, Spain (2014, 2016)
- Budapest, Hungary (2015)
- Katowice, Poland (2017)
- Las Palmas de Gran Canaria, Canary Islands (2018)
- Tampere, Finland (2019, 2025)
- Budapest, Hungary (2020), digital edition
- Porto, Portugal (2021)
- Lisbon, Portugal (2022)
- A Coruña, Spain (2023)
- Manchester, England (2024)

== Awards ==
The WOMEX Awards were first introduced in 1999. Since then, WOMEX presents its awards to artists or professionals each year for special achievements in the international music industry. Since 2006. WOMEX, in coordination with World Music Charts Europe and, from 2017 on, also with Transglobal World Music Chart, has presented Top 20 labels of the year who had the most chart-topping artist releases.
