= Shot by Both Sides =

Single by Magazine

from the album Real Life
- B-side: "My Mind Ain't So Open"
- Released: 20 January 1978
- Genre: Post-punk; pop punk; new wave
- Length: 4:04
- Label: Virgin
- Composers: Howard Devoto; Pete Shelley
- Lyricist: Howard Devoto
- Producers: Mick Glossop; Magazine

Magazine singles chronology
| "Shot by Both Sides" (1978) | "Touch and Go" (1978) |

Official Audio
- "Shot By Both Sides" (Remastered) on YouTube

"Shot by Both Sides" is a song written by Howard Devoto and Pete Shelley and performed by the English band Magazine. The single version produced by Mick Glossop, was released in January 1978 as the band's first single, reaching No. 41 on the UK Singles Chart. In March 1978, it was re-recorded with this time John Leckie as producer, for the band's debut album Real Life. The song has been cited as a seminal work of the post-punk genre, as well as of pop punk and new wave.

By the time of the single's recording, Magazine consisted of only four members, as original keyboardist Bob Dickinson had left the band the previous year.

The cover artwork was designed by Malcolm Garrett, based on the 1886 work La Chimere regarda avec effroi toutes choses by Symbolist artist Odilon Redon (1840–1916).

== Song ==
The name of the song came from a political argument between Devoto and his girlfriend, in which his girlfriend said to him; "Oh, you'll end up shot by both sides".

The song originated in a riff that Pete Shelley came up with when Devoto was helping him with "some tentative Buzzcocks songs. He played the chord sequence and I was really impressed, said so, and he just gave them to me there and then."

An identical guitar riff was used in the song "Lipstick" by Devoto's former band Buzzcocks, released as a B-side in November 1978.

== Reception ==
The song was ranked at No. 9 among the top "Tracks of the Year" for 1978 by NME.

The song was ranked number 989 among the greatest singles ever made in Dave Marsh's book The Heart of Rock & Soul (1989).

== Personnel ==
- Howard Devoto – vocals
- John McGeoch – guitar
- Barry Adamson – bass
- Martin Jackson – drums
