= Secondhand Daylight =

Studio album by Magazine
- Released: 30 March 1979
- Recorded: January 1979
- Studios: Good Earth Studios, London
- Genres: Post-punk; progressive rock
- Length: 42:33
- Label: Virgin
- Producer: Colin Thurston

Magazine chronology
| Real Life (1978) | Secondhand Daylight (1979) | The Correct Use of Soap (1980) |

Singles from Secondhand Daylight
- 1. "Rhythm of Cruelty" Released: 23 February 1979

Secondhand Daylight is the second studio album by English post-punk band Magazine. It was released on 30 March 1979 by record label Virgin. One single, "Rhythm of Cruelty", was released from the album.

== Writing ==
Unlike the group's debut Real Life, Howard Devoto did not contribute to writing the music for most of the tracks. Instead, the writing credits were split; Devoto, John McGeoch and Dave Formula each wrote songs alone and in collaboration with Barry Adamson, and Devoto and McGeoch wrote one song together. Devoto again provided lyrics for all compositions with the exception of the instrumental "The Thin Air", reputedly because the group ran out of studio time.

== Recording ==
The new lineup was stable until mid-1980 and consisted of Devoto (vocals), McGeoch (guitar and saxophone), Adamson (bass), Formula (keyboards) and newly recruited drummer John Doyle. The first release with Doyle had been the "Give Me Everything" single from November 1978.

The album was recorded in January 1979 at Good Earth Studios in London and using Virgin Records' mobile studio, which was used at Farmyard Studios. The album was produced and engineered by Colin Thurston. The album was Thurston's first production job; significantly, he had worked as an engineer for David Bowie's "Heroes" and Iggy Pop's The Idiot.

== Release ==
The album was originally released as an LP (with a gatefold sleeve) and as a cassette in March 1979. It peaked at No. 38 on the UK Albums Chart. The album was subsequently released as a budget album on LP, cassette and CD in the late 1980s. A remastered edition of the album was released by Virgin/EMI in 2007, along with the other three of the band's first four studio albums, including four bonus tracks and liner notes by Kieron Tyler. The original artwork featured an illustration by Ian Pollack, photography by Richard Rayner-Canham and typography by Malcolm Garrett.

== Reception ==
Professional ratings
Review scores
| Source | Rating |
|---|---|
| AllMusic | 4/5 stars |
| The Encyclopedia of Popular Music | 4/5 stars |
| The Irish Times | 4/5 stars |
| Q | 4/5 stars |
| Smash Hits | 6/10 |
| Stylus Magazine | A |
| Uncut | 2.5/5 stars |
| The Village Voice | C |

Upon its release, Secondhand Daylight was hailed in the NME. Reviewer Nick Kent described songs like "Feed the Enemy" as "very Low-period Bowiesque", due to the "stray saxophone bleats and lulling synthesiser chords". The Guardian wrote that the album "explores the mixture of keyboards, saxophone and Howard Devoto's Rottenesque vocals in a professional, controlled and surprisingly subdued manner".

Smash Hits was less positive; reviewer Red Starr found that "After the magic of Real Life, this is disappointingly ordinary. There's some good instrumental work in the nine long, flowing numbers, but the melodies are weak and the band lack conviction. Also, though his lyrics are more direct than last time, Howard Devoto is starting to get more pompous than imaginative." On its US release a year later, Richard C. Walls in Creem was also unimpressed: "musically and lyrically this stuff is old hat. There's no new wave succinctness here, no economy or irony. Just a surfeit of Pink Floydian chord coasting behind bleak and wintry lyrics."

== Track listing ==
All lyrics are written by Howard Devoto, except "The Thin Air" (instrumental) and "I Love You, You Big Dummy" (Don Van Vliet).

Side one
| No. | Title | Music writer(s) | Length |
|---|---|---|---|
| 1. | "Feed the Enemy" | Dave Formula | 5:45 |
| 2. | "Rhythm of Cruelty" | John McGeoch; Barry Adamson | 3:03 |
| 3. | "Cut-Out Shapes" | Devoto | 4:43 |
| 4. | "Talk to the Body" | McGeoch | 3:34 |
| 5. | "I Wanted Your Heart" | Formula; Adamson | 5:13 |
| Total length: | | | 22:18 |

Side two
| No. | Title | Music writer(s) | Length |
|---|---|---|---|
| 6. | "The Thin Air" | Devoto; McGeoch | 4:10 |
| 7. | "Back to Nature" | Formula | 6:40 |
| 8. | "Believe That I Understand" | Devoto; Adamson | 4:00 |
| 9. | "Permafrost" | Devoto | 5:25 |
| Total length: | | | 20:15 42:33 |

2007 remastered edition bonus tracks
| No. | Title | Music writer(s) | Length |
|---|---|---|---|
| 10. | "Give Me Everything" | Devoto | 4:23 |
| 11. | "I Love You, You Big Dummy" | Don Van Vliet (music and lyrics) | 3:54 |
| 12. | "Rhythm of Cruelty" (original single version) | McGeoch; Adamson | 3:04 |
| 13. | "TV Baby" | Formula | 3:48 |
| Total length: | | | 15:09 57:42 |

== Personnel ==
Magazine

- Howard Devoto – vocals
- John McGeoch – guitar, saxophone, backing vocals, keyboards ("Feed the Enemy" and "The Thin Air")
- Barry Adamson – bass guitar, backing vocals
- Dave Formula – keyboards
- John Doyle – drums, percussion

Technical

- Colin Thurston – production, engineering
- Tony Wilson – production on "Give Me Everything" and "I Love You, You Big Dummy"
- JJ Allom – engineering
- Bill Aitken – engineering on "Give Me Everything" and "I Love You, You Big Dummy"
- Ian Pollock – sleeve illustration
- Richard Rayner-Canham – sleeve photography
- Malcolm Garrett – sleeve typography and images

== Charts ==
| Chart (1979) | Peak position |
|---|---|
| New Zealand Albums (RMNZ) | 41 |
| UK Albums (Official Charts) | 38 |
