= MXR =

Music effects company

- Type: Private
- Industry: Consumer electronics
- Founded: 1972; 54 years ago
- Headquarters: Rochester, New York
- Products: effects pedals
- Parent: Dunlop Manufacturing
- Website: http://www.jimdunlop.com

MXR is a New York–based manufacturer of effects pedals from Rochester. The company was co-founded in 1972 by Keith Barr and Terry Sherwood and incorporated as MXR Innovations, Inc. in 1974. The MXR trademark is now owned by Jim Dunlop.

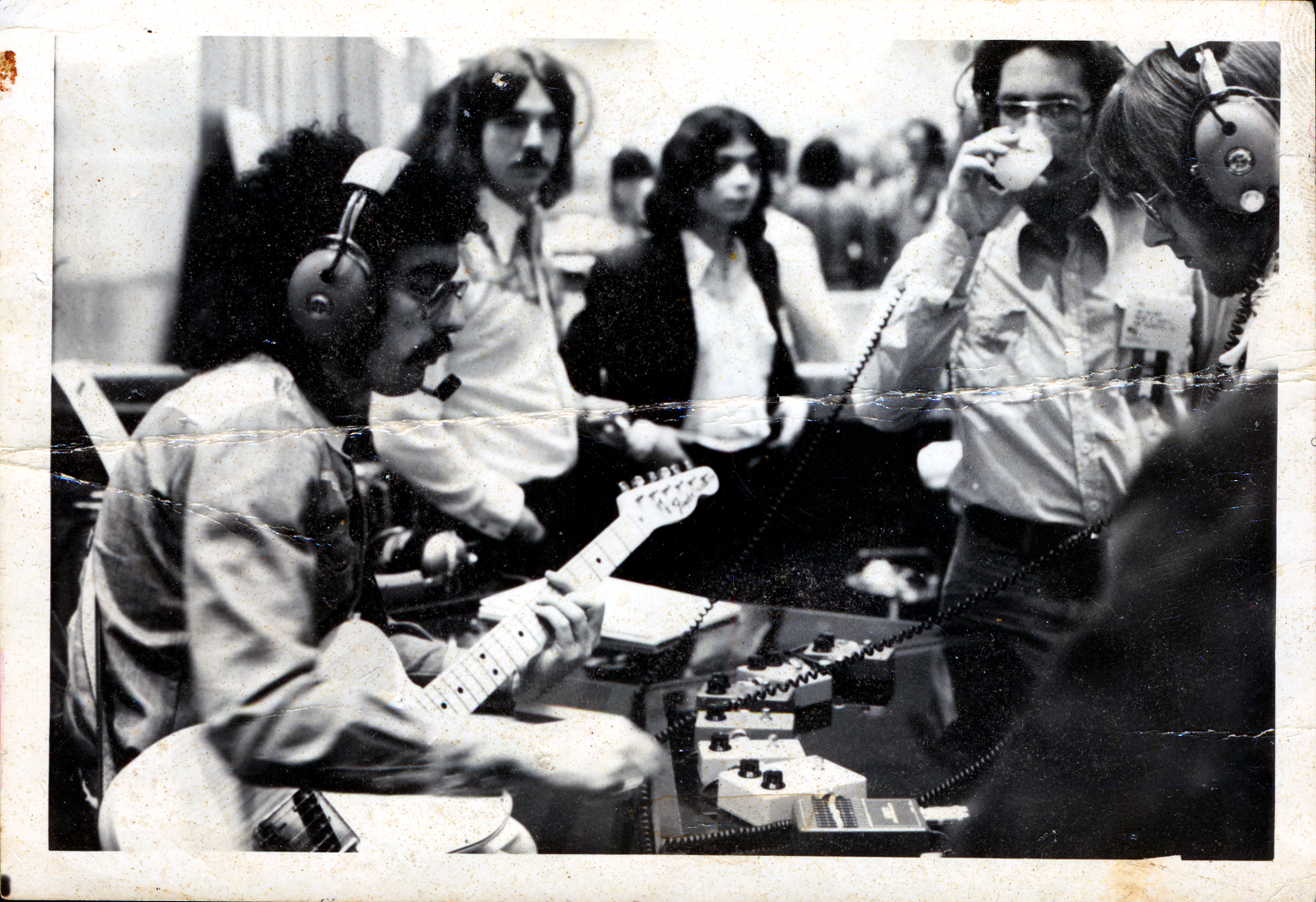
NAMM Show in LA

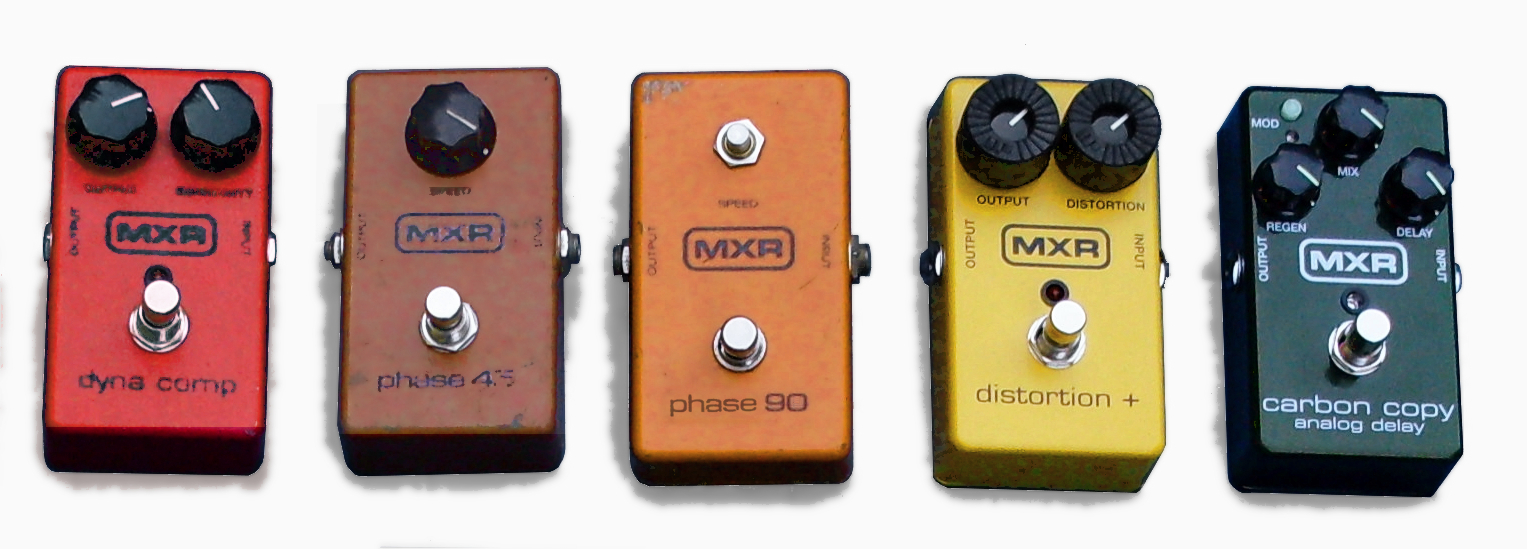
MXR dyna comp, phase 45, phase 90, distortion +, carbon copy

== History ==
MXR co-founders Terry Sherwood and Keith Barr met as high school students at Rush-Henrietta Senior High School in Henrietta, New York, a suburb of Rochester, New York. Together they started Audio Services, an audio repair business, where they repaired stereos and other music equipment in their rented basement apartment. This experience led them to form MXR and they began producing their first original effect pedal design: the Phase 90. This was quickly followed by the Distortion +, Dyna Comp, and the Blue Box. Michael Laiacona joined this early MXR team in a sales position. Barr later left MXR and went on to found Alesis while Sherwood and four managers/engineers of MXR, John Langlouise, Phil Betette, Tony Gambacurta and Richard Neutrour, co-founded Applied Research & Technology. Mike Laiacona and his wife went on to found Whirlwind USA.

Jim Dunlop acquired the MXR brand in 1987 and continues the pedal line of original MXR classics, such as the Phase 90 and Dyna Comp, as well as modern pedals like the Carbon Copy and Fullbore Metal. Dunlop has also added a line dedicated to bass effects boxes, MXR Bass Innovations, which has released the Bass Octave Deluxe and Bass Envelope Filter. Both pedals won Editor Awards in Bass Player Magazine and Platinum Awards from Guitar World Magazine. The MXR Custom Shop is responsible for recreations of vintage models such as the hand-wired Phase 45, as well as doing limited runs of pedals such as the Custom Comp.

=== Reference Series (1973–1984) ===
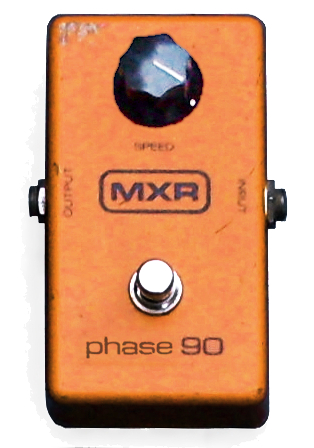
MXR MX-101 Phase 90
(1975–1981)

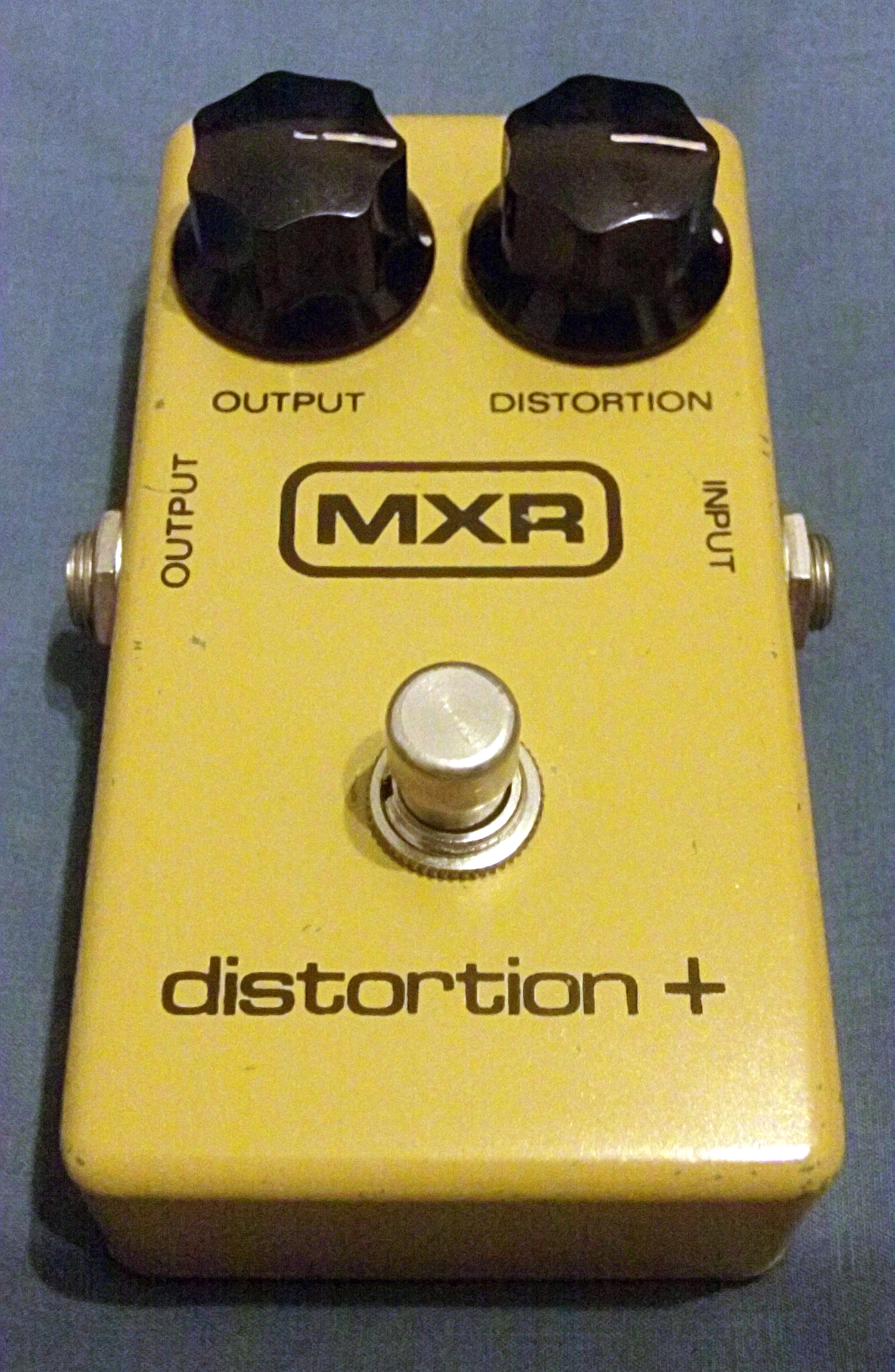
MXR MX-104 Distortion + (1979)

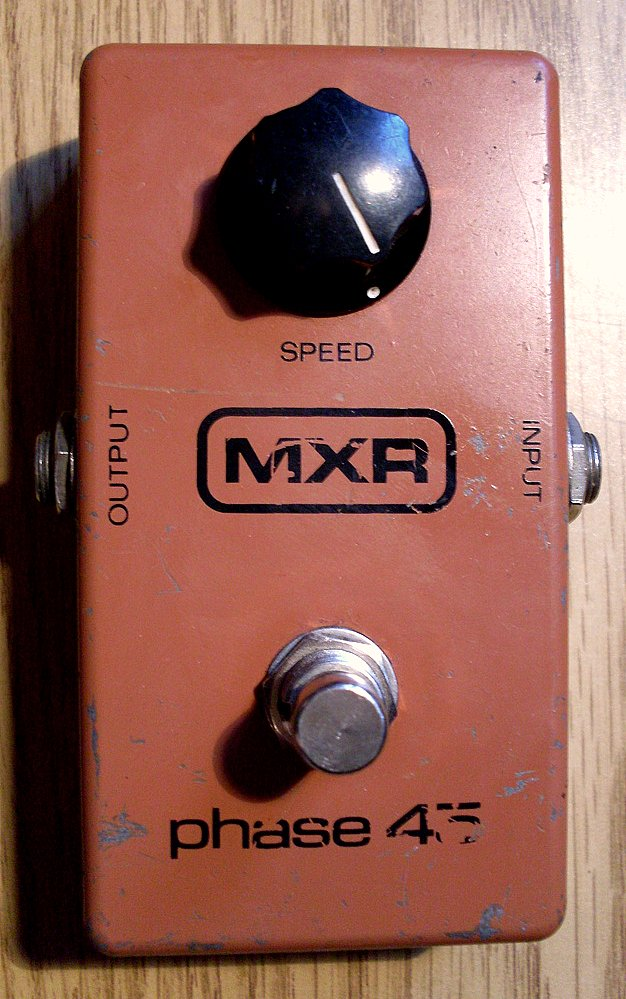
MXR MX-105 Phase 45
(1975–1981)

The first MXR effects pedal was the MX-101 MXR Phase 90 phaser. The Phase 90 was used on the first two Van Halen albums. The MXR Phase 45, followed, as well as a programmable version, the Phase 100. Like other pedals of the time, MXR pedals prior to 1981 did not have LEDs, A/C adaptor jacks, or true-bypass switching.

The first period is known as the "Script period," in reference to the cursive logo on the case. The earliest script logo pedals were made in the basement shop of the MXR founders and the logos were silk screened. These very first pedals can be identified by a slightly larger font "MXR" on the case.

The "Block Logo Period 1" began around 1975–1976 and lasted until 1981, and is named for the writing on the front of the box. The "Block logo period 2" started in early 1981 and went until 1984, when the company stopped making pedals. The main change in this era was the addition of LEDs and A/C adaptor jacks. These pedals used 1/8" power jacks and had exactly the same circuit board as their pre-1981 box logo brothers.

Model	Effect Name	Year Intro
MX-101	Phase 90	1974
MX-102	Dyna Comp	1974
MX-103	Blue Box	1974
MX-104	Distortion +	1974
MX-105	Phase 45	1974
MX-106	Noise Gate Line Driver	1975
MX-107	Phase 100	1975
MX-108	10 Band Graphic Equalizer	1976
MX-109	6 Band Graphic Equalizer	1976
MX-117	Flanger	1976
MX-118	Analog Delay	1976
MX-120	Envelope Filter	1976
MX-133	Micro Amp	
MX-134	Stereo Chorus	
MX-137	Power Converter	
MX-138	Power Plate	
MX-142	Distortion II	
MX-143	Limiter	
MX-144	Loop Selector	
MX-148	Micro Chorus	1982
MX-152	Micro Flanger	1982
MX-157	Headphone Amp	1982
MX-180	Omni Multi Effects	1983
MX-181	Omni Footswitch	1983

=== Commande Series (1981–1984) ===
In 1981, MXR introduced the Commande Series, a line of plastic (Lexan polycarbonate) pedals. Their design departed from the Reference Series in several respects. The input, output and power jacks were all moved to the top of the case to allow a tighter grouping on the floor, or pedal board.

- M-161 MXR Phaser
- M-162 MXR Preamp
- M-163 MXR Sustain
- M-164 MXR Overdrive
- M-166 MXR Time Delay
- M-167 MXR Stereo Chorus
- M-168 MXR Stereo Flanger

=== 2000 Series (1982–1984) ===
The Series 2000 was a complete rework of the Reference and Commande lines of pedals. They were higher quality pedals, with electronic FET switching and dual LED indicators. They had a contoured, all-metal chassis and an easily removable battery. They had a fully rubberized bottom and were remote-controllable. Most of the pedals had dual outputs with distinctly different sounds.

The MXR Series 2000 sported six models. These original pedals in the series included the Dyna Comp, Distortion +, Phaser, Stereo Chorus, Stereo Flanger and Time Delay. In late 1983 MXR announced a digital sound effects pedal generator simply known as the Junior. The Junior was released in early 1984 and was added to the other six pedals in the Series 2000 line. The Junior boasted four sound effects: a laser, a clap, a snare and a high hat. The effects were samples stored on a replaceable 24-pin ROM chip that was produced by MXR. MXR continued to manufacture most of the Reference, Commande and 2000 Series pedals until they closed down in 1984.

Model Number	Effect Name	Year Intro
M-201	Phaser	1982
M-202	Dyna Comp	1982
M-203	Stereo Flanger	1982
M-204	Distortion+	1982
M-205	Stereo Chorus	1982
M-206	Time Delay	1982
M-210	Junior	1984

=== MXR Rackmount Effects ===
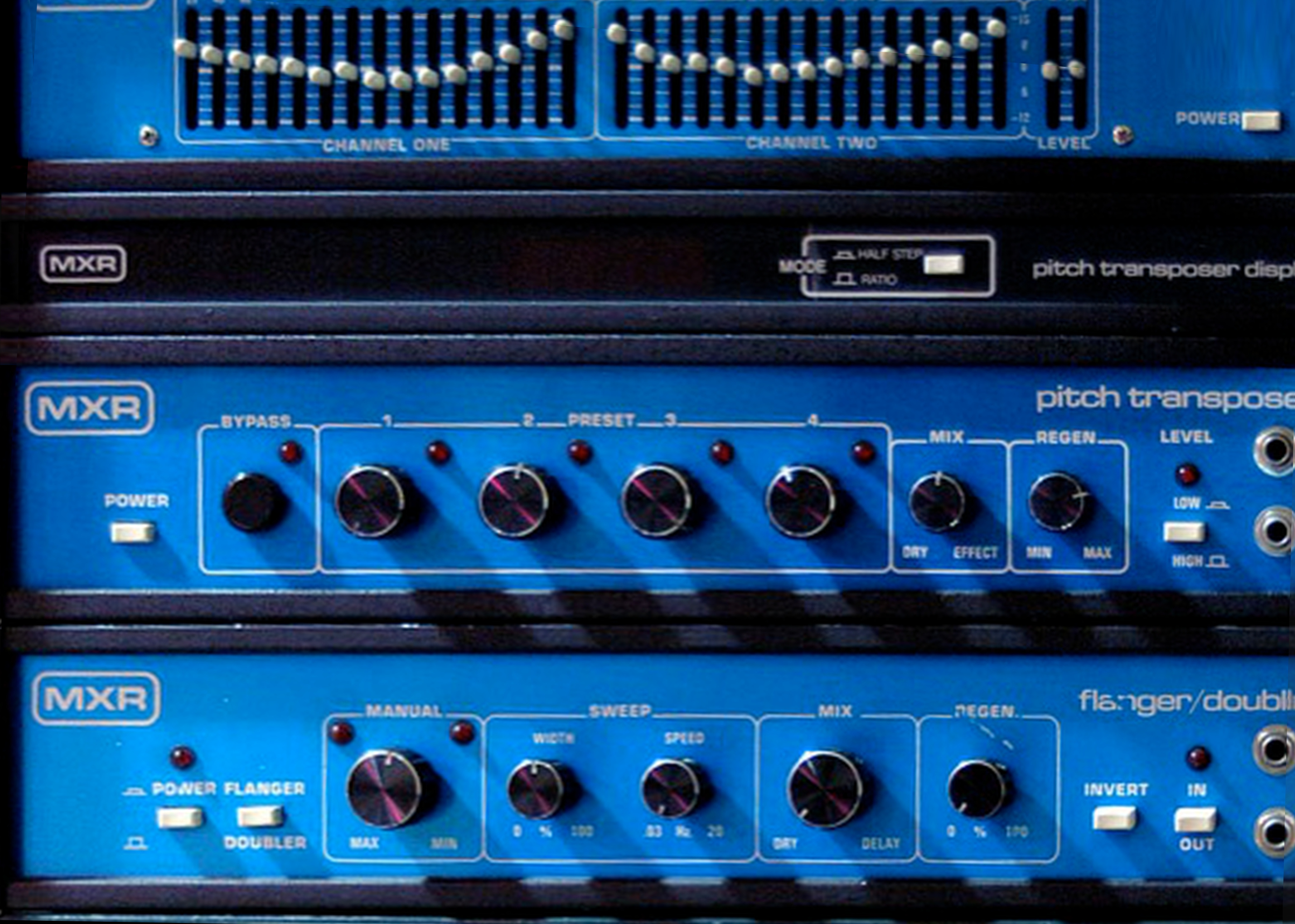
MXR M-124 Dual 15-Band Graphic EQ
MXR M-131 Pitch Transposer Display
MXR M-129 Pitch Transposer
MXR M-126 Flanger/Doubler

MXR also had a line of professional rackmount effects used by the likes of David Gilmour, Stuart Adamson and Mike Rutherford. The first product introduced was the Digital Delay, which had delay times from 0.08ms to 320ms, but users could purchase additional plug-in memory boards that were user-installable and could increase delay times to 1280ms.

Maximum Delay (msec)

bandwidth	1 Memory Board	2 Memory Boards	3 Memory Boards	4 Memory Boards
20 kHz	40	80	120	160
10 kHz	80	160	240	320
5 kHz	160	320	480	640
2.5 kHz	320	640	960	1280

Model Number	Product Name	Year Introduced
MX-113	Digital Delay	1976
MX-122	Case for Delay	
MX-124	Dual 15-Band Graphic EQ	
MX-125	31-Band Equalizer	
MX-126	Flanger/Doubler	
MX-129	Pitch Transposer	
MX-510	Pitch Transposer with LED Display	
MX-136	Dual Limiter	
MX-151	Delay System II	1982
MX-175	Digital Time Delay	
	Pitch-Shift Doubler	

In 1983, MXR introduced one of the first multi-effect rack units for guitar and bass, the Omni. The Omni had 6 different effects: sustain, distortion, delay, equalization, flanger and chorus. The main unit was a 2U with separate controls for each effect. There was a footpedal (M-181) that enabled the player to switch the different effects on and off, as well as changing the order of the distortion and equalizer effects, a master bypass as well as an effects loop. Since 2006, the "M-181" product number has been re-appropriated by Jim Dunlop for the MXR Bass Blowtorch Overdrive pedal.

=== MXR Desktop Effects ===
In 1980 MXR released the MX-114 Two Channel Graphic Equalizer. From the 1980 Catalog: "The Equalizer's wide dynamic range and interface characteristics allow for a variety of applications. the frequency response of a system can be tailored to compensate for room acoustics, speaker aberrations and program material. Horizontal control placement and the equalizer's compact case permit easy manipulation in studio mix down situation. P.A. applications include: suppression of major feedback frequencies, compensation for high frequency attenuation in miking and rejection of unwanted signals (60Hz hum and noise) Two channels permit separate main and monitor equalization."

=== Drum Computers ===
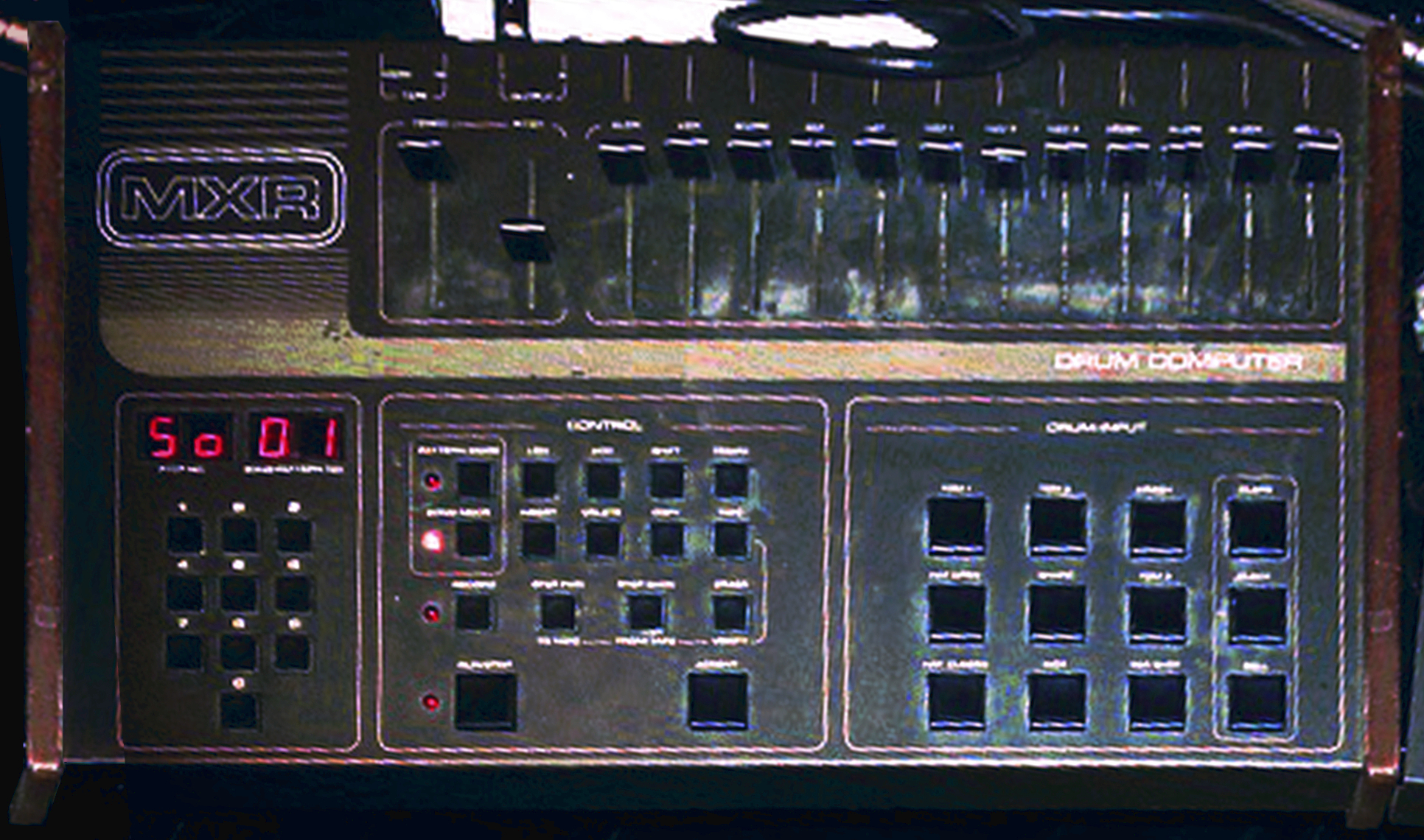
MXR 185 Drum Computer

In late 1981, MXR got the resale rights in the US to sell the KIT (M-178), a digital drum machine. In early 1983, MXR released the M-185 MXR Drum Computer, similar to Roger Linn's Linn LM-1 drum machine with individual pads for the instrument sounds and individual volume controls for each sound.

== Jim Dunlop and MXR ==
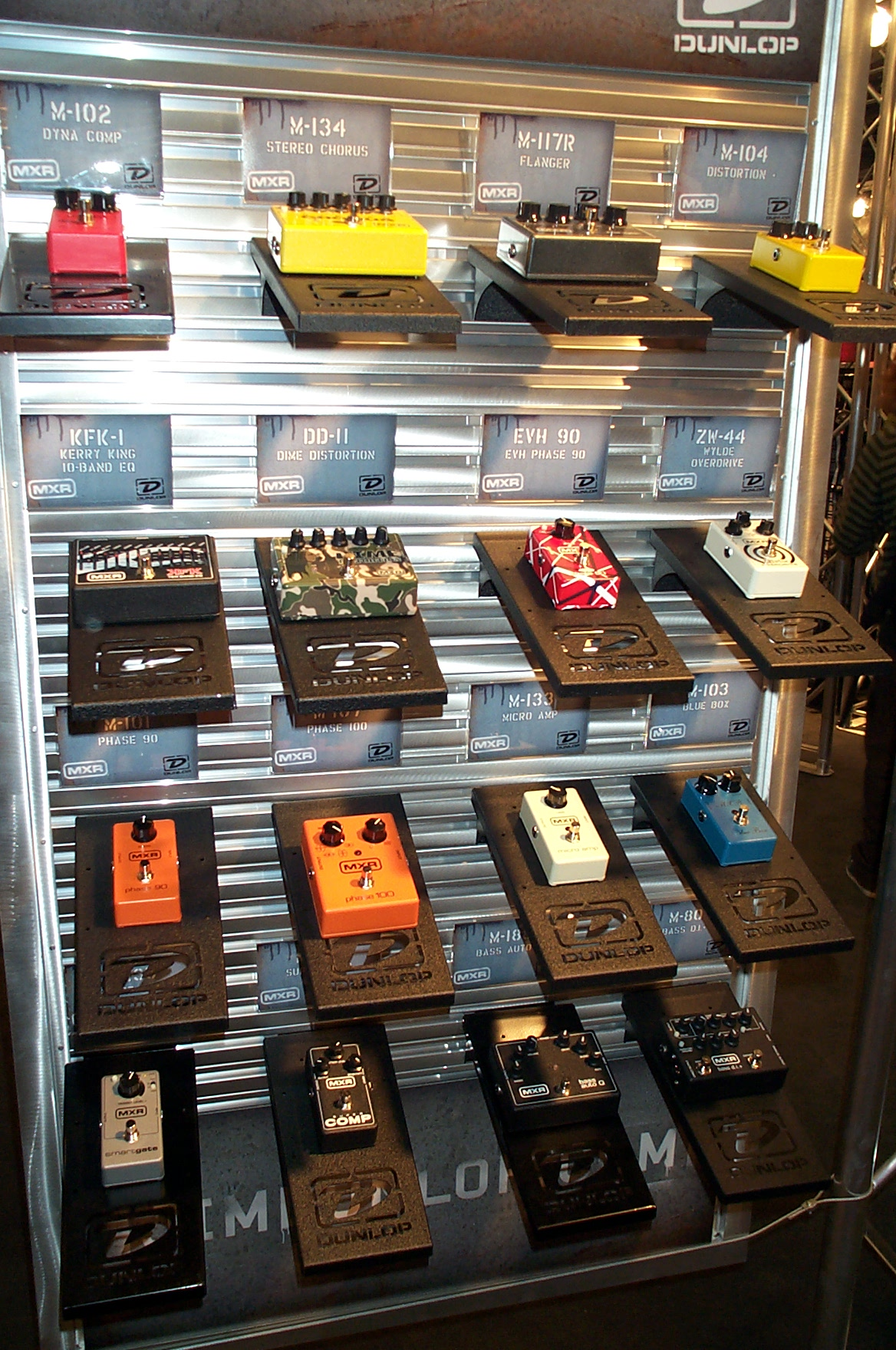
MXR by Jim Dunlop

Jim Dunlop bought the MXR licensing rights and currently manufactures reissues of some of the classic MXR effects pedals. Dunlop has created new models in addition to the original lineup, including signature pedals such as Eddie Van Halen Phase 90 and Flanger, and Zakk Wylde's Wylde Overdrive and Black Label Chorus. The brand has also collaborated with two boutique pedal-makers on mass-produced versions of their renowned overdrive pedals, in 2020 with the Timmy (based on Paul Cochrane's pedal of the same name), and in 2022 with the Duke of Tone (based on Analog Man's King of Tone).

== Products ==
- MXR Dyna Comp
- MXR Phase 90
- MXR Distortion +
