= Howard Devoto =

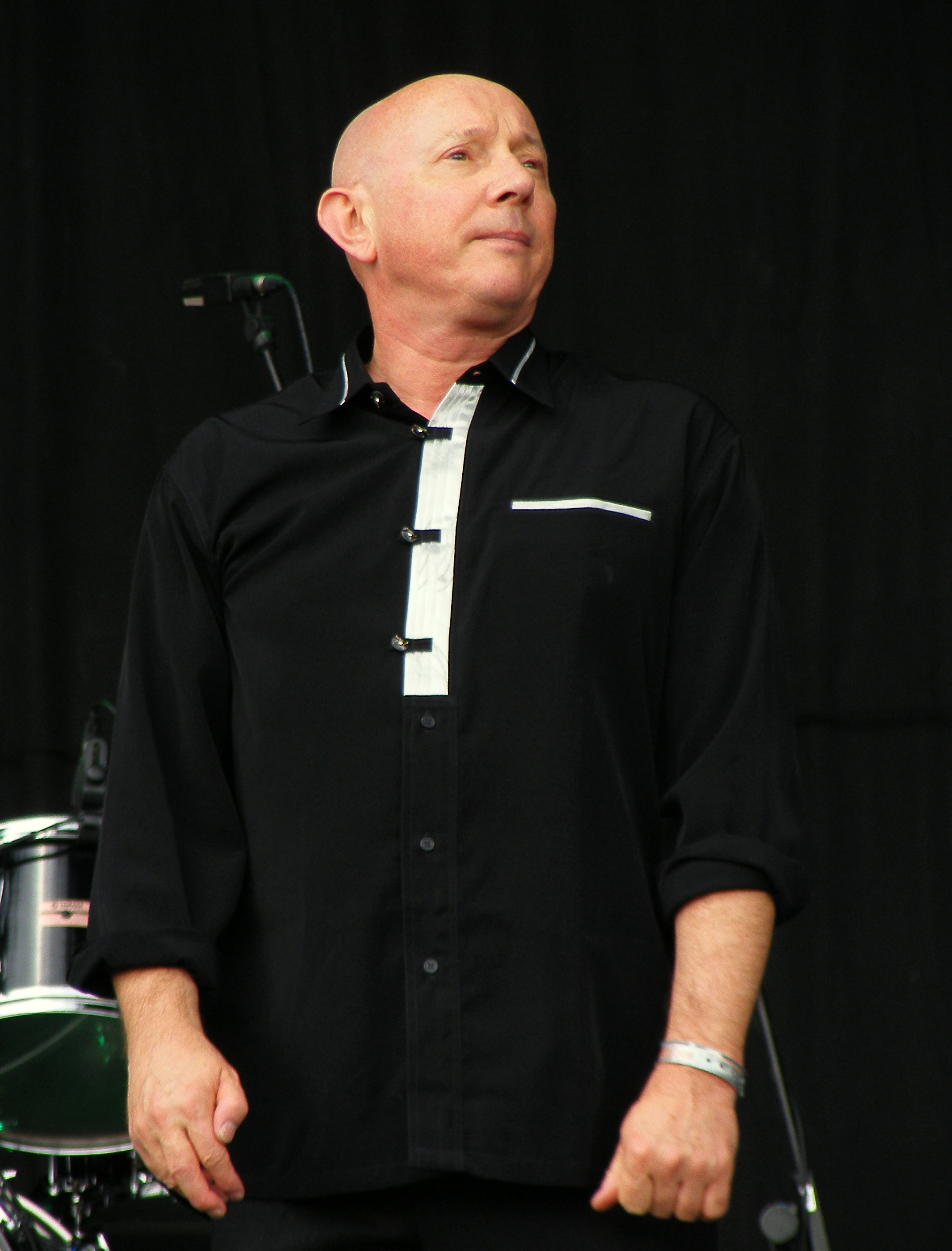
- Devoto performing with Magazine in 2011

Background information
- Born: Howard Trafford; 15 March 1952 (age 74); Scunthorpe, Lincolnshire, England
- Genres: Punk rock; post-punk; synthpop; new wave; electronic
- Instruments: Vocals; keyboards; guitar
- Years active: 1976–2012, 2024
- Labels: New Hormones; Virgin; I.R.S.; EMI

Howard Devoto (born Howard Trafford, 15 March 1952) is an English singer and songwriter, who began his career as the frontman for punk rock band Buzzcocks, but then left to form Magazine, an early post-punk band. After Magazine, he went solo and later formed indie band Luxuria.

== Early life and education ==
Howard Devoto was born Howard Trafford on 15 March 1952. Born in Scunthorpe, he grew up in Nuneaton, Warwickshire, and Moortown, Leeds.

He attended Leeds Grammar School, where he met and befriended future Buzzcocks manager Richard Boon. In 1972, he went to Bolton Institute of Technology (now the University of Bolton) to study psychology, and, later, humanities. During these college years, he met his future bandmates Pete Shelley and Ben Mandelson. He picked the stage name "Devoto" before meeting Shelley, using the surname of Andy Devoto, a friend of his landlord.

== Career ==
=== Buzzcocks ===
Inspired by the Sex Pistols, Devoto co-formed Buzzcocks with singer/guitarist Pete Shelley in 1976. He left the band in February 1977 after only one record (the Spiral Scratch EP) and a small number of performances to form the band Magazine.

=== Magazine ===
Devoto formed the post-punk band Magazine in 1977. They released several critically acclaimed albums, which met with moderate commercial success, as well as minor hits such as "Shot by Both Sides" and "A Song from Under the Floorboards". Magazine reformed in February 2009, initially performing on a tour of five dates, and subsequently continued playing live and began to record new material. A studio album, No Thyself, was released in October 2011.

=== Solo years ===
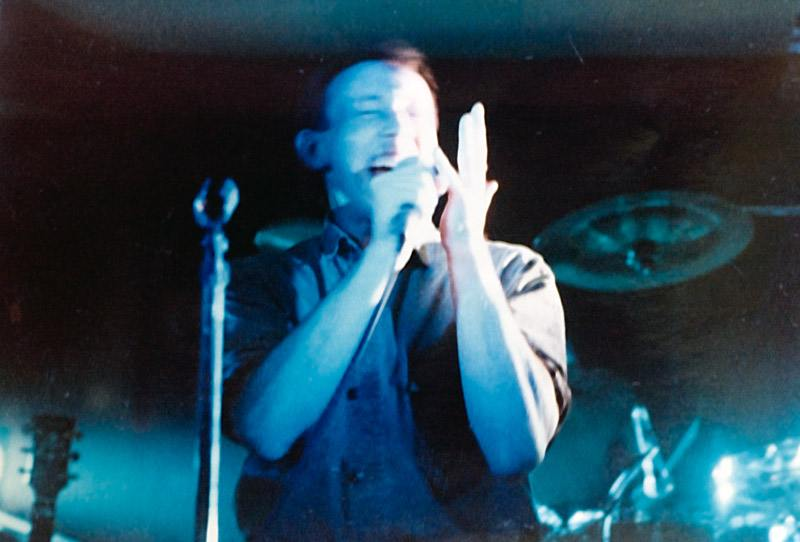
Devoto performing circa 1983

After Magazine split in 1981 Devoto spent two years putting together a solo album with former Magazine keyboard player Dave Formula. Jerky Versions of the Dream reached No. 57 in the UK Albums Chart in August 1983, and was reissued in 2007 by Virgin/EMI, featuring several tracks of bonus material.

=== Other appearances ===
Between his work with Magazine and other groups, Devoto made scattered appearances as a guest or collaborator on occasional other recordings.

A collaboration on three songs with Bernard Szajner on the Brute Reason LP was released on Island Records in 1983. This was followed by Devoto's vocal being featured on a version of Big Star's "Holocaust" for the loose collective This Mortal Coil on their 1984 album It'll End in Tears. Devoto was one of the few This Mortal Coil contributors who was not signed to 4AD record label.

In 1997, Devoto wrote the lyrics to the Mansun track "Everyone Must Win", which appeared on the Closed for Business EP. A year later he collaborated again with the band, writing lyrics for and singing on "Railings", a B-side for "Being a Girl (Part One)".

=== Luxuria ===
One of his next projects was a 1988 collaboration with Liverpool multi-instrumentalist Noko. As Luxuria they released two albums and a music video for the single "Redneck".

=== Life after popular music ===
For most of the 1990s Devoto was little involved in music, earning his living by working for a photo agency.

In 2001, he teamed up with Buzzcocks colleague Pete Shelley for the first time in twenty-five years, and released the much-anticipated Buzzkunst under the name ShelleyDevoto. Reviews were mixed.

In 2002, Devoto had a small part in the movie 24 Hour Party People, a film about Manchester's Factory Records. In his brief cameo appearance, Devoto appears as a caretaker cleaning a men's toilet while actor Martin Hancock portrays Devoto having sex with the wife of promoter/journalist Tony Wilson. The real-life Devoto breaks the fourth wall by addressing the camera and stating, deadpan, "I definitely don't remember this happening".

Magazine reformed in February 2009, with former Luxuria partner Noko replacing the deceased John McGeoch on guitar.

=== Reunion with Buzzcocks ===
In November 2011, it was announced he would be returning to the stage with Buzzcocks for two special shows as part of the Buzzcocks "Back to Front" tour on 25 and 26 May 2012. These took place at the O2 Apollo in Manchester and the O2 Academy in Brixton

== Tributes, honours, and cover songs ==
Devoto's singing has been characterised as a "speak-sing voice that veered between amused croon and panicked yelp".

A number of bands continue to be influenced by his work. Momus recorded the tribute song "The Most Important Man Alive" for the Bungalow Records compilation Suite 98 in 1998. Mansun have covered "Shot by Both Sides" live, and recorded it on their fourth and final album Kleptomania. Radiohead and Jarvis Cocker have both covered "Shot by Both Sides". Both Ministry and Peter Murphy have covered Magazine's "The Light Pours Out of Me", whilst Simple Minds, My Friend The Chocolate Cake, Morrissey and Strange Boutique have covered Magazine's "A Song from Under the Floorboards".

On 9 July 2009, Devoto was awarded an honorary doctorate from the University of Bolton for his contribution to music.

== Discography ==
For Magazine and Luxuria, see Discography of Magazine and Discography of Luxuria. This is from his solo career:

=== Solo discography ===
Albums

- 1983: Jerky Versions of the Dream – No. 57 UK

Singles

- 1983: "Rainy Season" – No. 97 UK
- 1983: "Cold Imagination"

=== Chronological discography ===
- Spiral Scratch (January 1977) (with Buzzcocks)
- Real Life (June 1978) No. 29 UK (with Magazine)
- Secondhand Daylight (March 1979) No. 38 UK (with Magazine)
- The Correct Use of Soap (May 1980) No. 28 UK (with Magazine)
- Magic, Murder and the Weather (June 1981) No. 39 UK (with Magazine)
- Jerky Versions of the Dream (July 1983) No. 57 UK (Solo)
- Unanswerable Lust (1988) (with Luxuria)
- Beast Box (1990) (with Luxuria)
- Time's Up (1991) (with Buzzcocks)
- Buzzkunst (2001) (with ShelleyDevoto)
- No Thyself (November 2011: Wired18) No. 167 UK (with Magazine)
