= Buzzkunst =

Studio album by ShelleyDevoto
- Released: 5 March 2002
- Length: 45:42
- Label: Cooking Vinyl
- Producer: ShelleyDevoto

Professional ratings
Review scores
Source	Rating
AllMusic	3/5 stars
Alternative Press	4/5 stars
Pitchfork	7.0/10
PopMatters	favourable
Q	3/5 stars
Uncut	5/5 stars

Buzzkunst is the sole album by UK group ShelleyDevoto. The studio album reunited Pete Shelley and Howard Devoto, founding members of the punk group Buzzcocks and was their first collaboration since the 1970s.

== Track listing ==
All music written by Howard Devoto and Pete Shelley. All lyrics by Howard Devoto.

No.	Title	Length
1.	"Can You See Me Shining?"	3:31
2.	"Strain of Bacteria"	2:10
3.	"Deeper"	2:53
4.	"'Til the Stars in His Eyes Are Dead"	2:57
5.	"On Solids"	3:28
6.	"Self-Destruction"	3:50
7.	"You Are Still There"	3:14
8.	"God's Particle"	2:34
9.	"A World to Give Away"	3:59
10.	"Stupid Kunst"	3:15
11.	"System Blues"	3:02
12.	"So There I Was"	4:08
13.	"Wednesday's Emotional Setup"	2:48
14.	"Going Off"	3:46
15.	"'Til The Stars in His Eyes Are Dead" (Live) (Video)
16.	"Going Off" (Live) (Video)

Videos were recorded live at 'Irregular' in London on 9 February 2000.

== Personnel ==
ShelleyDevoto

- Pete Shelley – vocals, producer
- Howard Devoto – vocals, producer

with:

- Harrison Smith – tenor and soprano saxophone on "On Solids"
- Kay Hoffnung – backing vocals on "Self-Destruction"
