= Luxuria (band) =

British musical duo

- Origin: England
- Genres: Indie rock
- Years active: 1987–1990
- Labels: Beggars Banquet
- Past members: Howard Devoto; Noko
- Website: Official MySpace

Luxuria were a British duo made up of vocalist Howard Devoto (formerly of Buzzcocks and Magazine) and instrumentalist Norman Fisher-Jones, a.k.a. Noko. They were active in the 1980s and early 1990s.

Devoto and Noko met through Pete Shelley. The two recorded six collections of material.

In 1987, they signed to Beggars Banquet and formed Luxuria. In 1988, they released their debut album, Unanswerable Lust. Their second and final album, Beast Box, was released in 1990.

== Discography ==
Studio albums

- Unanswerable Lust (LP and CD, Beggars Banquet BEGA90, 1988)
- Beast Box (LP and CD, Beggars Banquet BEGA106, 1990)

Compilation albums

- Unanswerable Lust / Beast Box (3xCD, Cherry Red CDTRED 512, 2011)

Singles

- "Redneck" (7" and 12", BEG204, Dec 1987)
- "Public Highway" (7" and 12", BEG211, May 1988)
- "Luxuria" (7", Mighty Boy MB 20157, 1988) (Australia only)
- "The Beast Box Is Dreaming" (12" and CD, BEG233, 1990)
- "Jezebel" (7", 12", and CD, BEG242, 1990)
  - All singles released on Beggars Banquet; except where indicated.

Video albums

- Beast Box (VHS, Beggars Banquet BB009, 1990)
