= The Speedometors =

Band from London

The Speedometors or Speed-O-Metors are a new wave/punk rock band from London. They were formed in 1976 in Shepherd's Bush by Martin Finlay, Robbie Watson and Lol Gellor (previously of the West London band Rough Diamonds) and joined shortly thereafter by Ian "Toose" Taylor, later of the Mike Batt-produced group Houdini.

The Speedometors attracted the attention of the independent record label Mascot Records, and the release of the single "Disgrace"/"Work" put the band on the UK Indie Chart. Drummer Gellor decided to leave the band to become a record producer and commenced by working on Desmond Dekker's album Black and Dekker. Steve Parry (ex-Radio Stars) replaced Gellor.

Meanwhile, the "Disgrace" single came to the attention of the producer Miki Dallon, who presented the disc to industry representatives at the Midem Song Festival, resulting in the band being signed by the Acrobat/Arista label. The signing resulted in the release of the Day in the Lights album.

During the recording of the LP, Parry left the band, and was replaced by Paul Spencer (ex-Magazine). As a result of the LP sessions, the band added Lee Dallon on keyboards and Chris Gent on saxophone for live appearances.

Their next single, "Tonight Tonight", received airplay on BBC Radio 1 and a BBC recording session followed. The band continued to tour the UK with Sham 69 and Ultravox (then featuring John Foxx as singer and frontman). Club shows included a residency at the Marquee Club in Wardour Street, London, coupled with two appearances at the Reading Festival.

== Discography ==
=== Singles ===
- "Disgrace" (1978) – Mascot Records
- "Tonight Tonight" (1979) Acrobat/Arista

=== Albums ===
- Day in the Lights (1979) Acrobat/Arista records
- Reel to Real Liverpool recordings 1977 (2018) Detour/Bin records
