= MXR Dyna Comp =

Musical effects unit

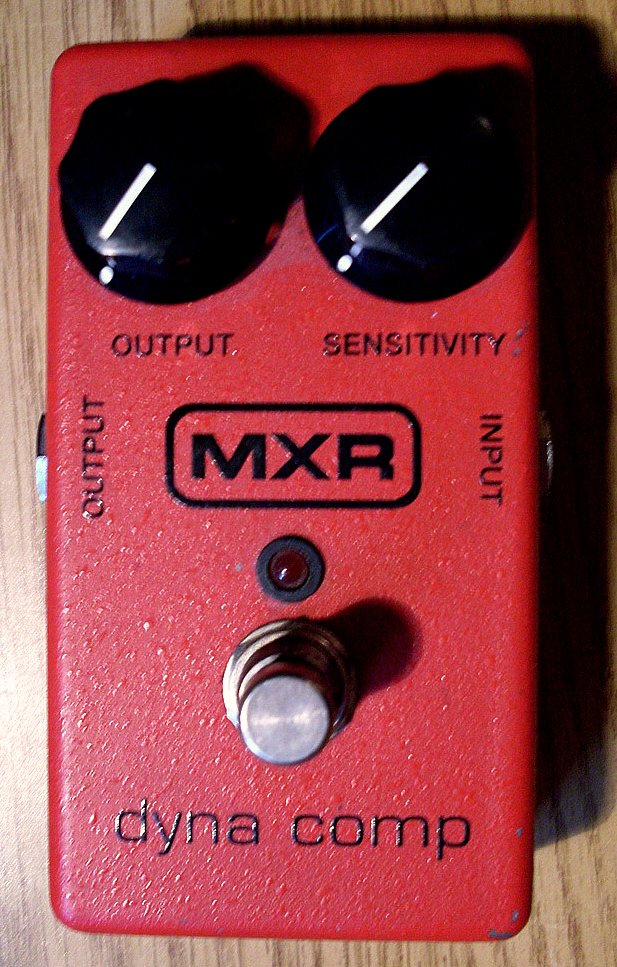

The MXR Dyna Comp is an effects unit, which is an electronic device that alters the sound of a musical instrument. This effects unit is produced by the MXR company intended for use with electric guitar. Made since the 1970s, the MXR Dyna Comp, which adds its own coloring to the tone, has become a frequently copied and widely used guitar effect, even a standard.

== History ==
The MXR Dyna Comp was first produced in the 1970s and became "a Nashville standard". It is frequently copied by other builders and hobbyists. MXR also produces a 'vintage' Dyna Comp, with the 1970s "script" logo, and an updated version, the Super Comp, which has an "Attack" control that determines its "bite-/squash ratio".

== Description ==
The unit produces a dynamic range compression effect. It has two controls: "Output" controls the output level, and "Sensitivity" determines the amount of compression.

== Use ==
The compression effect helps to smooth out differences in volume between notes, such as in quick runs played by chicken picking. It also fattens up the sound, giving more body and sustain to lead guitar lines, and can be used as a booster. Its "thickening" effect is especially appreciated in Nashville, where many country music guitar players who use Fender Telecasters use it to thicken the otherwise thin sound of the single-coil guitar; besides, the compressor's lessening of the initial attack "gives the effect of a pedal steel player working his volume pedal".

The effect can be used by bass players as well.

The MXR Dyna Comp is not considered tone-neutral; that is, it adds its specific coloring to the sound, which is appreciated by many users.

== Notable users ==
- Adrian Belew
- David Byrne
- Lowell George
- David Gilmour
- Sonny Landreth
- Jim Messina
- John Frusciante
- Masayoshi Takanaka
