= Magazine (band) =

British post-punk band

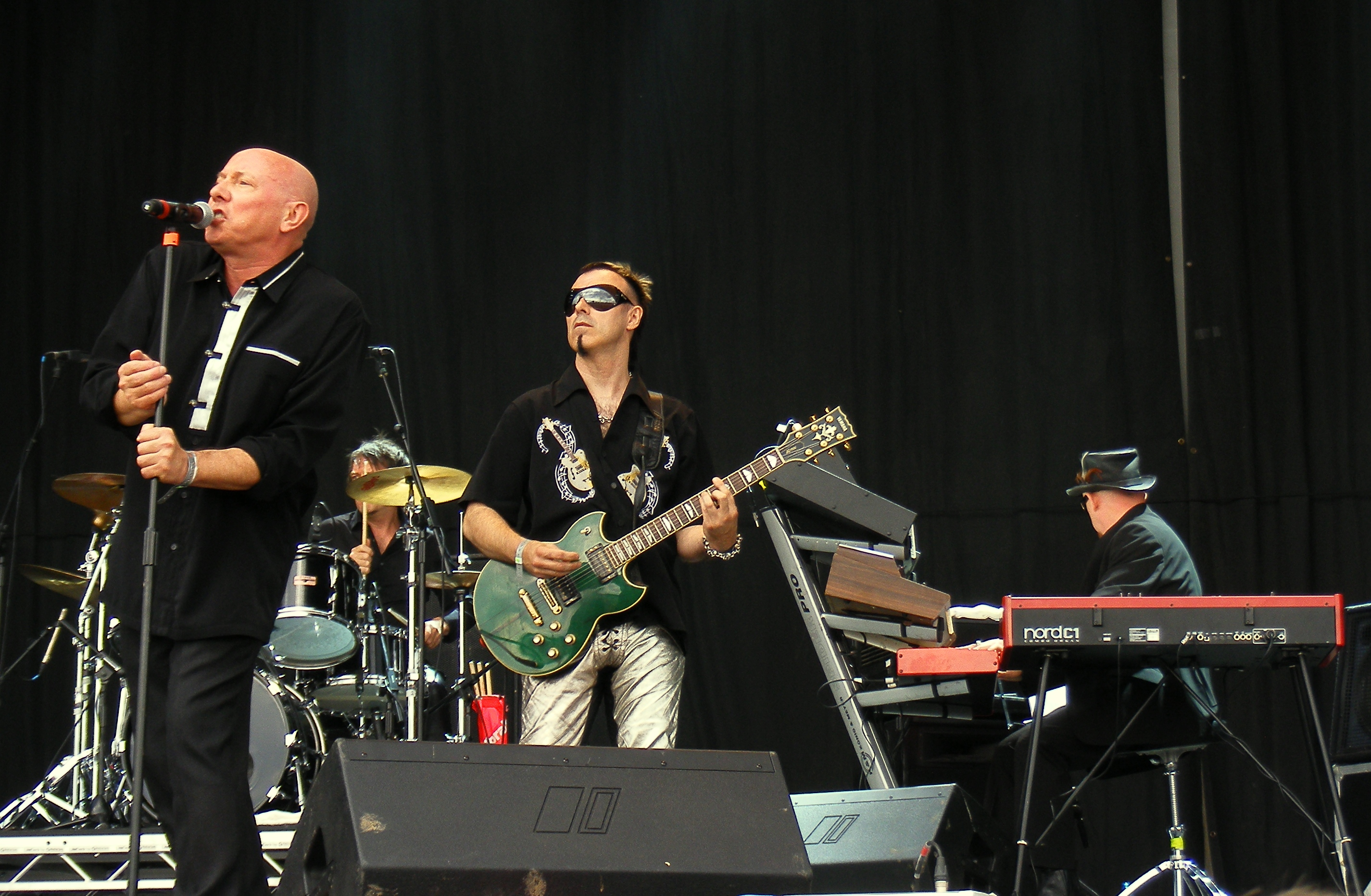
- Magazine performing at the Hop Farm Festival, July 2011

Background information
- Origin: Manchester, England
- Genres: Post-punk; new wave; art rock
- Years active: 1977–1981, 2009–2011
- Labels: EMI; Virgin; IRS
- Past members: Howard Devoto; John McGeoch; Barry Adamson; Martin Jackson; Bob Dickinson; Dave Formula; Paul Spencer; John Doyle; Robin Simon; Ben Mandelson; Noko; Jonathan "Stan" White

Magazine were a British rock band formed in 1977 in Manchester, England by singer Howard Devoto and guitarist John McGeoch. After leaving the punk rock group Buzzcocks in early 1977, Devoto decided to create a more progressive rock band. The original line-up of Magazine was composed of Devoto, McGeoch, Barry Adamson on bass, Bob Dickinson on keyboards and Martin Jackson on drums.

Their debut album, Real Life (1978), was critically acclaimed and later considered one of the first British post-punk albums. After releasing two other albums, Secondhand Daylight and The Correct Use of Soap, McGeoch left the band in 1980 to join Siouxsie and the Banshees. Magazine released another studio album and disbanded in 1981. All four of their albums reached the top 40 on the UK Albums Chart.

They reunited in 2009 for a UK tour with Noko on guitar. Magazine released an album of new material, No Thyself, in October 2011, followed by a short UK tour.

Magazine have been cited as an influence by bands and musicians such as Simple Minds, the Smiths, Radiohead, Pulp, Pond, and John Frusciante.

== History ==
Devoto formed Magazine in Manchester, shortly after he left Buzzcocks in early 1977. In April 1977, he met guitarist McGeoch, then an art student, and they began writing songs, some of which would appear on the first Magazine album. They then recruited Barry Adamson on bass, Bob Dickinson on keyboards and Martin Jackson (previously of the Freshies) on drums, forming the first line-up of the band. After signing to Virgin Records, Magazine played their debut live gig at Rafters in Manchester on 28 October 1977.

"Motorcade" co-writer Dickinson, whose background was in classical and avant-garde music, left shortly after several gigs in late 1977. In mid-February 1978, the band recorded their first John Peel session for BBC radio. In early 1978, they also released their first single, "Shot by Both Sides", produced by Mick Glossop: it was a song Magazine recorded as a quartet. It featured a guitar-bass-drums sound similar to punk rock. Shortly after the single's release, Dave Formula, who had played with a briefly successful 1960s rock band from Manchester called St. Louis Union, joined as keyboardist. "Shot by Both Sides" used a chord progression suggested by Pete Shelley, which was also used in the Buzzcocks track "Lipstick". The Magazine single just missed the UK top 40. The band, with Formula on keyboards, made its first major TV appearance on Top of the Pops in February 1978, performing the single. The band recorded their first John Peel session for BBC radio 1 on 14 February 1978: the four tracks were broadcast on 20 February. "Shot by Both Sides" was re-recorded and produced by John Leckie for their debut album Real Life.

Following a British tour to promote Real Life (which made the UK top 30), Jackson left Magazine in late July. He was replaced briefly by Paul Spencer, who performed with the band for gigs across Europe and some television appearances, including The Old Grey Whistle Test, where they played "Definitive Gaze". Spencer quit partway through the tour, joining the Speedometors shortly afterwards. He was replaced in October by John Doyle, who completed the Real Life promotional tour and remained in the band.

Magazine's second album, Secondhand Daylight, was released in 1979, reaching the UK top 40. The album featured a greater use of synthesisers. That same year, McGeoch, Adamson and Formula joined electronic project Visage, recording and releasing the single "Tar".

After the release of Secondhand Daylight, Devoto decided to change producers. He chose Martin Hannett, who produced their next album, The Correct Use of Soap, released the following year and again making the top 30, while the single "Sweetheart Contract" was a minor success on the singles chart. Following its release, McGeoch left the band, tired of Magazine's low sales and their less guitar-oriented songs. He soon joined Siouxsie and the Banshees. To replace him, the band hired Robin Simon, who had been in Ultravox and Neo. That line-up toured Europe and Australia, recording their next release, the live album Play. Simon made some initial recordings and rehearsals for what would be the next Magazine album, including co-writing the song "So Lucky", but he left the band before the album was released so that he could record the John Foxx solo album The Garden.

Again without a guitarist, Devoto called in his former college friend at Bolton, Ben Mandelson (a former Amazorblades member). This line-up completed the 1981 recording of the band's fourth studio album, Magic, Murder and the Weather, but Devoto quit that May, months before its release, and the remaining members disbanded. A year later, After the Fact, the first Magazine compilation, was released.

Adamson continued collaborating with Visage, and also began to work with Shelley, the Birthday Party and Nick Cave and the Bad Seeds. Jackson later played with the Chameleons, Swing Out Sister and the Durutti Column. Formula continued as a member of Visage and joined Ludus, and Mandelson joined the Mekons. Doyle joined the Armoury Show in Scotland in 1983, which also featured McGeoch; the latter later played guitar for Public Image Ltd. After a brief solo outing and two albums with Luxuria, Devoto quit music to become a photo archivist, until a new collaboration with Shelley produced the Buzzkunst album in 2002. McGeoch died in 2004, aged 48.

=== Reunion ===
In February 2009, Devoto and Magazine re-formed for five performances. The line-up included Devoto, Formula, Adamson and Doyle. The Radiohead guitarist Jonny Greenwood, a Magazine fan, declined an offer to fill in for McGeoch. According to the Radiohead collaborator Adam Buxton, Greenwood was "overwhelmed" and too shy to accept the role. Noko, Devoto's bandmate in Luxuria, was the guitarist on the tour.

The shows were sold out and received acclaim. The group went on to play at festivals in the UK and abroad that summer, before performing "The Soap Show" in Manchester, Edinburgh and London. The band played two sets: a performance of The Correct Use of Soap in full, followed by a set composed of other songs from their catalogue.

In January 2010, Noko officially joined the band, becoming a full member of Magazine. The band started work on new material. In November 2010, Adamson left to concentrate on his film work and solo recordings. Jon "Stan" White joined as bass player on the new recordings and debuted live on 30 June 2011 at Wolverhampton Slade Rooms, where Magazine were playing a warm-up show for their Hop Farm Festival appearance two days later.

A new studio album, No Thyself, was released worldwide by Wire Sound on 24 October 2011, and the band embarked on a UK tour in November. On 16 April 2016, as part of Record Store Day, the band released Once at the Academy, a live 5-track 12" EP recorded at their reunion shows at Manchester Academy in February 2009.

== Legacy ==
Magazine was an influence on the fledgling Simple Minds, who supported them on a 1979 tour and much later covered "A Song from Under the Floorboards". The Radiohead guitarist Jonny Greenwood named McGeoch his biggest guitar influence, and said that Magazine's songwriting "informs so much of what we do". Radiohead performed a cover of "Shot By Both Sides" in 2000.

Johnny Marr of the Smiths cited Magazine as an influence, particularly McGeoch's guitar work. The Smiths singer, Morrissey, covered "A Song from Under the Floorboards" as a B-side to his 2006 single "The Youngest Was the Most Loved". "Floorboards" was also covered by My Friend the Chocolate Cake on their 1994 album Brood. MGMT played a version of "Burst" on tour in 2011.

Jarvis Cocker of Pulp praised Real Life saying: "this was such an important record for the time because it showed that you could still do something that had attack to it combined with a real intelligence, without going into ponce territory". The band and their singer/lyricist Howard Devoto have also been cited as an influence on several 1980s bands, such as China Crisis and Fiction Factory.

Lolita Pop recorded a cover of "A Song from under the Floorboards" on 1989's Love Poison. Half Man Half Biscuit have performed live covers of a number of Magazine songs. "The Light Pours Out of Me" was covered by several acts including Peter Murphy, Ministry, the Mission, Sleep Chamber and Zero Boys. The band No Fun at All did a cover of "Shot by Both Sides" on their record And Now for Something Completely Different. Mansun covered "Shot by Both Sides" for John Peel sessions. Duff McKagan cited Real Life as an influence, particularly on tracks where a chorus effect is used.

== Members ==
Classic line-up

- Howard Devoto – lead vocals (1977–1981, 2009–2011)
- John McGeoch – guitar, saxophone, backing vocals, keyboards (1977–1980; died 2004)
- Barry Adamson – bass guitar, backing vocals (1977–1981, 2009–2010)
- Dave Formula – keyboards (1977–1981, 2009–2011)
- John Doyle – drums (1978–1981, 2009–2011)

Other members

- Martin Jackson – drums (1977–1978)
- Bob Dickinson – keyboards (1977)
- John Scott – guitar (1977)
- Paul Spencer – drums (1978)
- Robin Simon – guitar (1980)
- Ben Mandelson – guitar, violin (1981)
- Noko – guitar, backing vocals (2009–2011)
- Jonathan "Stan" White – bass guitar, backing vocals (2010–2011)

== Discography ==
Magazine discography
- Studio albums: 5
- EPs: 1
- Live albums: 4
- Compilation albums: 7
- Singles: 12
- Video albums: 2
- Music videos: 6

The Magazine discography consists of five studio albums, four live albums, seven compilation albums, two video albums, one extended play and 10 singles.

All titles were released by Virgin Records, except where indicated.

=== Studio albums ===
Year	Title	Peak chart positions	
Year	Title	UK	AUS
1978	Real Life	29	―
1979	Secondhand Daylight	38	―
1980	The Correct Use of Soap	28	98
1981	Magic, Murder and the Weather	39	95
2011	No Thyself: Label: Wire-Sound	167	—
"—" denotes releases that did not chart.

=== Live albums ===
Year	Title	UK
1980	Play	69
1993	BBC Radio 1 in Concert: Label: Windsong International	—
2009	Real Life & Thereafter	—
2009	Live And Intermittent (Restored And Remastered) (08.79 + 09.79 + 09.80): Label: Wire-Sound	—
2016	Once at the Academy (EP): Label: Wire-Sound	—

=== Singles ===
Year	Title	Peak chart positions		Album
Year	Title	UK	US Dance	Album
1978	"Shot by Both Sides"	41	—	Real Life
1978	"The Light Pours Out Of Me "	—	—	Real Life
1978	"Touch and Go"	—	—	Non-album single
1978	"Give Me Everything"	—	—	Non-album single
1979	"Rhythm of Cruelty"	—	—	Secondhand Daylight
1979	"Believe That I Understand"	—	—	Secondhand Daylight
1980	"A Song from Under the Floorboards"	—	—	The Correct Use of Soap
1980	"Thank You (Falettinme Be Mice Elf Agin)"	—	42	The Correct Use of Soap
1980	"Upside Down"	—	—	Non-album single
1980	Sweetheart Contract (EP)	54	—	The Correct Use of Soap
1981	"About the Weather"	—	—	Magic, Murder and the Weather
2011	"Hello Mr Curtis": Label: Wire-Sound	—	—	No Thyself
"—" denotes releases that did not chart or were not released in that territory.

=== Compilation albums ===
Year	Title
1982	After the Fact
1987	Rays and Hail 1978–1981: The Best of Magazine
1990	Scree – Rarities 1978–1981
2000	Where the Power Is
2000	Maybe It's Right to Be Nervous Now
2008	The Complete John Peel Sessions
2009	Touch & Go: Anthology 02. 78–06. 81

=== Video albums ===
Year	Title
1989	Magazine (VHS)
2009	Real Life & Thereafter DVD/CD: Label: Wire-Sound

== See also ==
- List of new wave artists
- List of Peel sessions
- List of post-punk bands
- Music of the United Kingdom (1970s)
