= Amazorblades =

British punk rock band (1977)

- Origin: Brighton, England, UK
- Genres: Punk rock
- Years active: 1977
- Label: Chiswick Records
- Past members: Ray Cooper (Chopper), Ben Mandelson, Rob Keyloch, Steve Harris, and Robin Watson

Amazorblades were one of the early British punk rock groups, as chronicled in Henrik Poulsen's book 77: The Year of Punk and New Wave, from Brighton, England. They released a single, "Common Truth" c/w "Mess Around" on Chiswick Records. It was later featured on the Long Shots, Dead Certs And Odds on Favourites (Chiswick Chartbusters Volume Two) compilation album (1978: Chiswick).

Band member Chopper went on to join the Oysterband. Fellow member Ben Mandelson (a.k.a. Hijaz Mustapha) was a founder member of 3 Mustaphas 3 with Chopper and is now a noted world music record producer. Rob Keyloch runs a successful recording studio.

Drummer Steve Harris died on 11 January 2008.
