= John McGeoch =

Scotttish musician (1955–2004)

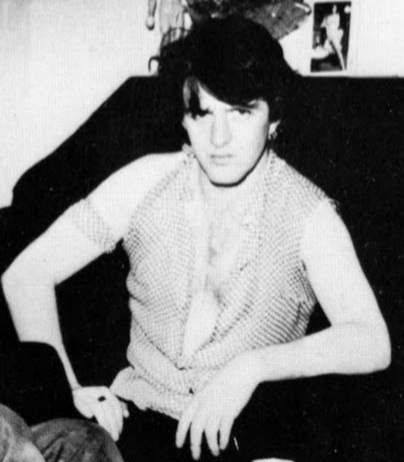
- McGeoch in 1981

Background information
- Born: John Alexander McGeoch; 25 August 1955; Greenock, Renfrewshire, Scotland
- Died: 4 March 2004 (aged 48) Launceston, Cornwall, England
- Genres: Post-punk; new wave; gothic rock; synth-pop; alternative rock
- Occupation: Guitarist
- Instruments: Guitar; keyboards; vocals; saxophone
- Years active: 1970–1995
- Labels: Virgin; Polydor; Parlophone
- Formerly of: Magazine; Visage; Siouxsie and the Banshees; The Armoury Show; Public Image Ltd; Pacific
- Website: johnmcgeoch.com

John Alexander McGeoch (25 August 1955 – 4 March 2004) was a Scottish musician and songwriter. He is best known as the guitarist of the rock bands Magazine (1977–1980) and Siouxsie and the Banshees (1980–1982).

He has been described as one of the most influential guitarists of his generation. In 1996 he was listed by Mojo in their "100 Greatest Guitarists of All Time" for his work on the Siouxsie and the Banshees song "Spellbound". Signature characteristics of his playing style included inventive arpeggios, string harmonics, the uses of flanger and an occasional disregard for conventional scales.

He was also a member of the bands Visage (1979–1980), the Armoury Show (1983–1986) and Public Image Ltd (1986–1992).

McGeoch has been cited as an influence by guitarists such as Johnny Marr, Jonny Greenwood, Ed O'Brien, the Edge, John Frusciante, Robert Smith, Steve Albini, Duane Denison, James Dean Bradfield and Dave Navarro.

== Early life ==
McGeoch was born on 25 August 1955 in Greenock, Renfrewshire, Scotland, where he spent his childhood years. He began to play the guitar at 12 years of age, first learning British blues music, being influenced by the work of Eric Clapton, and also that of Jimi Hendrix. He took piano lessons for five years until the age of twelve. When his parents bought him a guitar, he stopped piano. In 1970 he played with a local band called the 'Slugband'. In 1971 his parents moved to London.

In 1975 he went to art school in Manchester where he received a degree in Fine Art. In his final year in 1976, he was enraptured by a new music that "ended up being called punk rock". He called it "the revolution, and I really do think that's the right word for it". He maintained an interest in photography, painting and drawing throughout his life.

== Career ==
=== 1977–1980: Magazine and Visage ===
In April 1977, McGeoch's Manchester student flatmate Malcolm Garrett introduced him to Howard Devoto, who had recently left the band Buzzcocks and was looking for a guitarist to form a new band. The pair formed Magazine with Barry Adamson, Bob Dickinson and Martin Jackson. The band released its debut single, "Shot by Both Sides" in January 1978. The music was written by Pete Shelley with lyrics by Devoto, and the single reached number 41 on the UK Singles Chart. That same year, McGeoch graduated from Manchester Polytechnic.

McGeoch played on Magazine’s first three albums, Real Life (1978), Secondhand Daylight (1979) and The Correct Use of Soap (1980). He remained with the band through the release and promotion of The Correct Use of Soap, touring the album during 1980 and playing his final show with Magazine in August. He left the band that September to officially join Siouxsie and the Banshees, reportedly disappointed by Magazine’s continued lack of sustained commercial success despite strong critical acclaim.

In 1979, while still a member of Magazine, McGeoch joined Steve Strange's electronic band Visage alongside Magazine bandmates Adamson and Dave Formula. He recorded guitar and saxophone parts for the band's first single "Tar" and later contributed to their 1980 self-titled album Visage. The band proved commercially successful, with the single "Fade to Grey" reaching number one in several European countries. McGeoch later said the income from the song allowed him to buy a house. He did not record on the group's second album, The Anvil, as it was recorded in London while he was away touring with Siouxsie and the Banshees.

While still a member of Magazine and Visage, McGeoch also worked occasionally with other bands. In mid-1980 he recorded most of the guitar work on Gen X's album Kiss Me Deadly at AIR Studios in London. In September 1980 he guested with Skids for a Peel Session, standing in for Stuart Adamson who was unwell. Later session work included Tina Turner's comeback track with the British Electric Foundation and for Propaganda He also collaborated with ex-Magazine drummer John Doyle on Ken Lockie's album The Impossible.

=== 1980–1982: Siouxsie and the Banshees ===
When recording with Siouxsie and the Banshees in early 1980, McGeoch entered a period of both creative and commercial success. During his first session with the Banshees he began a new style of playing. He later commented: "I was going through a picky phase, as opposed to strumming. "Happy House" was lighter and had more musicality in it. They invited me to join. I was sad leaving Magazine but the Banshees were so interesting and it felt like a good move". He became an official member of the group at the release of "Israel" in November 1980, which was the first single he composed with the band.

He recorded guitar on the Banshees' long-players Kaleidoscope (1980), Juju (1981) and A Kiss in the Dreamhouse (1982). The Banshees' hit singles of this era featured some of McGeoch's most acclaimed work, particularly 1980's "Happy House", "Christine" and "Israel", and 1981's "Spellbound" and "Arabian Knights". McGeoch's contribution to the band was important in terms of sounds and style. Singer Siouxsie Sioux later said:

John McGeoch was my favourite guitarist of all time. He was into sound in an almost abstract way. I loved the fact that I could say, "I want this to sound like a horse falling off a cliff", and he would know exactly what I meant. He was easily, without a shadow of a doubt, the most creative guitarist the Banshees ever had".

However, McGeoch suffered a nervous breakdown due to the stresses of touring and an increasing personal problem with alcohol. He arrived in Madrid for a promotional stay in bad state and made several uncharacteristic mistakes at a gig. Back home, he was forced to leave the band in October 1982 to rest and recover.

=== 1983–1986: The Armoury Show ===
In 1983, during a break from playing music, he produced Swedish punk-funk band Zzzang Tumb's debut long-player.

He joined the band the Armoury Show which included Doyle as well as ex-Skids members Richard Jobson and Russell Webb. Their album Waiting for the Floods released in 1985, features some of McGeoch's best guitar work. He contributed to former Bauhaus singer Peter Murphy's debut solo long-player Should the World Fail to Fall Apart.

=== 1986–1992: Public Image Ltd ===
In 1986, McGeoch joined John Lydon's Public Image Ltd, a decision which may have been partly motivated by financial difficulties he was in at this time. He had been an admirer of PiL, particularly of Lydon's lyrics, yet reportedly had previously turned down an offer from him to join the band in 1984. Despite being struck in the face with a bottle thrown from the crowd during one of his first gigs with the band, McGeoch remained with PiL until it disbanded in 1992, making him, at that time, the longest-serving member apart from Lydon. He recorded on its long-players: Happy?, 9 and That What Is Not.

In 1992 he was invited by the Icelandic band the Sugarcubes to play the lead guitar on the song "Gold" for their Stick Around for Joy long-player.

=== 1993–2004: Last years ===
Without a band, he ended his career seeking to form one via a variety of short-lived ventures, including working with Glenn Gregory and the songwriter/producer Keith Lowndes. With John Keeble of Spandau Ballet and vocalist Clive Farrington of When in Rome, he formed a line-up provisionally titled 'Pacific', but no commercial material came of it.

In the mid-1990s McGeoch retired from professional music and trained as a nurse/carer. In the early 2000s he was reported as attempting to re-enter professional music by working on musical scores for television productions.

== Equipment ==
During his time with Magazine and Siouxsie and the Banshees, McGeoch played a Yamaha SG1000 guitar with a mic-stand mounted MXR M117R flanger raised to hand height. This setup allowed him manipulate the flanger's controls at the same time as playing guitar. In 1977, after Magazine signed a recording contract, he bought his first SG1000 guitar from A1 Music in Manchester. He also played on a 12 String Ovation acoustic guitar. He also used a MXR Dynacomp Compressor and a Yamaha Analog Delay. His amps were a Roland Jazz Chorus JC120 and two Marshall MV50 combos. His use of flange and chorus added depth and space to his guitar parts. During the recording sessions of Juju, he used devices such as the Gizmo on "Into the light", and an EBow on "Sin in My Heart".

Whilst working with 'The Armoury Show', he also used a customised Telecaster, a white Squier 1957 Stratocaster, an Ibanez AE410BK and an Ibanez AE100. For pedals, alongside his 'flanger on a stick', he was using an MXR Compressor, two Ibanez harmonisers and an Ibanez Super Metal pedal. During his work with PiL, and in his last years he favoured a solid wood Carvin electric guitar. He also used a Washburn Tour 24 guitar for touring during 1988.

== Legacy ==
McGeoch has been cited as a major influence by numerous guitarists. Johnny Marr from the Smiths said: "When I was in my teens, there weren't many new guitar players who were interesting and of their time.[...] [McGeoch’s work] was really innovative guitar music which was pretty hard to find back then. To a young guitar player like myself, those early Banshees singles were just class". Simon Goddard wrote that McGeoch was a "significant inspiration" on Marr. Marr said: "Really my generation was all about a guy called John McGeoch, from Siouxsie and the Banshees". Marr also stated: "The music he made with the Banshees … the word imperial was made for that music".

Radiohead have cited McGeoch's work with Magazine and Siouxsie and the Banshees as an influence. The lead guitarist, Jonny Greenwood, said McGeoch was the guitarist that had most influenced him. The Radiohead guitarist Ed O'Brien also cited him as a "big influence", and one of the "great guitarists [who] weren't lead guitarists". He said that McGeoch was "responsible for some of the greatest riffs ever ... 'Spellbound', 'Christine', 'Happy House'... His riffs are so elegant and once you learn how to play them there is almost a zen like quality to the sound and movement of your hands. It reminds me of the beauty in Johnny Marr's playing." For Radiohead's 2003 single "There There", their producer, Nigel Godrich, encouraged Greenwood to play like McGeoch in Siouxsie and the Banshees.

Dave Navarro of Jane's Addiction said that he "always loved all the different guitarists that have been in Siouxsie and the Banshees". John Frusciante of Red Hot Chili Peppers named McGeoch in his primary influences: "[McGeoch] is such a guitarist I aspire to be. He has a new brilliant idea for each song. I usually play on the stuff he does on Magazine's albums and Siouxsie & the Banshees's like Juju." Frusciante praised him as a musician "who played in more textural ways" and who made "interesting music". Frusciante "bought an SG, because I'm a big fan of John McGeoch from Siouxsie and the Banshees and Magazine. When I'd play along with his records using a Strat, the parts sounded too thin and weak for the simple power of his playing. In learning the SG, I had to teach myself to bend in a brand-new way and use new muscles to do vibrato."

The Edge of U2 cited McGeoch as an influence and chose the Siouxsie and the Banshees song "Christine" for a compilation made for Mojo. Interviewed in March 1987, the Edge said his "background is much more Tom Verlaine and John McGeoch". Robert Smith of the Cure praised McGeoch's guitar part on "Head Cut", including it in his five favourite guitar tracks: "This is really harsh funk in a weird way – clever choppy chords." Roddy Frame of Aztec Camera praised McGeoch saying, "he chose very simple lines over anything bombastic,... the song came first and he tried to complement that". In a playlist, William Reid of the Jesus and Mary Chain selected two of McGeoch's songs, "Spellbound" by the Banshees and "Definitive Gaze" by Magazine.

Steve Albini of Big Black praised McGeoch for his guitar playing with Magazine and Siouxsie and the Banshees, qualifying as "great choral swells, great scratches and buzzes, great dissonant noise and great squealy death noise. What a guy" and further commenting: "anybody can make notes. There's no trick. What is a trick and a good one is to make a guitar do things that don't sound like a guitar at all. The point here is stretching the boundaries". Albini also stated: "He was an innovator with the pure sound of his guitar... I admire the economy of his playing. He made very precise choices that were usually beautifully simple". Duane Denison of the Jesus Lizard chose McGeoch as his favorite guitarist for his work with Magazine and the Banshees, especially on Juju, saying: "his playing was atmospheric and aggressive" and "truly inspiring to me". Mark Arm of Mudhoney "loved [McGeoch's] work with Magazine and Siouxsie And The Banshees". Arm praised McGeoch's musical approach, saying: "He's got a very unique style... He's a very original thinker and not an 'overplayer' – the little bits where he does a solo are really innovative and super-cool... Space is key, a secret ingredient for musicians which shouldn't be a secret. Knowing when to step back – John had that ability". Guided by Voices's guitarist Doug Gillard said that "McGeoch... was a big influence."

Terry Bickers of the House of Love cited him as one of his favourite musicians. James Dean Bradfield of the Manic Street Preachers said that McGeoch was "slightly avant-garde. He was a genius". Bradfield added that McGeoch's guitar-playing makes "you realize you were listening to a new version of rock and roll". Andy Cairns of Therapy? said that the guitar playing of McGeogh on the Banshees' Juju "is so inspiring".

Stuart Braithwaite of Mogwai qualified McGeoch as "the best post-punk guitarist", saying, "he played like no-one else, totally distinct and with unyielding imagination. I hear his influence everywhere to this day", and dubbed him "a total legend". Andy MacFarlane of the Twilight Sad cited him as one "of the guitarists I still continue to revisit when I'm writing. The ideas they were coming up with at the time still sound as fresh just now as they did back then".

In 2008, the BBC aired an hour-long radio documentary on McGeoch's life and work, titled Spellbound: The John McGeoch Story.

In April 2022, The Light Pours Out of Me, an authorised biography of McGeoch by Rory Sullivan-Burke, was released by Omnibus Press. It features interviews with guitarists Greenwood, Marr, Frusciante and singers Siouxsie and Devoto.

== Personal life ==
On 9 September 1981, McGeoch married Janet Pickford, his girlfriend at Manchester Polytechnic, the marriage later ending in divorce. On 14 September 1988, he married Denise Dakin, the second marriage producing a daughter, Emily Jean McGeoch (b. 1989).

== Death ==
McGeoch died at the age of 48 in his sleep on 4 March 2004 at his home in Launceston, Cornwall from sudden unexpected death in epilepsy (SUDEP).

=== Tribute ===
Banshees' drummer Budgie wrote a text to honour him on the Siouxsie website, saying: "Without any disrespect to all the other guitarists we have worked with, none had the relaxed mastery and such a depth of expression as John McGeoch. No amount of scrutiny of filmed 'Live' performance tapes could reveal the subtle economy of technique that made an apparently complex phrase look so deceptively simple. Exasperated guitarists would often comment, "But his hands don’t even move!"

== Discography ==
=== Albums (as band member) ===
Magazine

- Real Life (1978)
- Secondhand Daylight (1979)
- The Correct Use of Soap (1980)

Visage

- Visage (1980)

Siouxsie and the Banshees

- Juju (1981)
- A Kiss in the Dreamhouse (1982)

Armoury Show

- Waiting for the Floods (1985)

Public Image Ltd

- Happy? (1987)
- 9 (1989)
- That What Is Not (1992)

=== Albums (as a guest musician) ===
with Siouxsie and the Banshees

- Kaleidoscope (1980)

with Gen X

- Kiss Me Deadly (1981)

with Ken Lockie

- The Impossible (1981)

with Peter Murphy

- Should the World Fail to Fall Apart (1986)

with the Sugarcubes

- Stick Around for Joy (1992)

== Bibliography ==
- Sullivan-Burke, Rory (April 2022). The Light Pours Out of Me: The Authorised Biography of John McGeoch. Omnibus Press. ISBN 978-1913172664.
