= Real Life (Magazine album) =

1978 studio album

Studio album by Magazine
- Released: 24 June 1978
- Recorded: March–April 1978
- Studios: The Manor Mobile and Abbey Road Studios, London
- Genres: Post-punk; new wave; art rock
- Length: 41:24
- Label: Virgin
- Producer: John Leckie

Magazine chronology
Real Life (1978)	Secondhand Daylight (1979)

Singles from Real Life
- 1. "Shot by Both Sides" Released: 20 January 1978; 2. "The Light Pours Out of Me" Released: 1978

Real Life is the debut studio album by the English post-punk band Magazine, released in June 1978 by Virgin Records. It reached number 29 in the UK Albums Chart. The album includes a re-recorded version of the band's debut single "Shot by Both Sides", and was preceded by the non-album single "Touch and Go", a song from the album's recording sessions.

Real Life has received critical acclaim and is considered a pioneering post-punk album. It has also been described as new wave and art rock. It was also included in the 2005 book 1001 Albums You Must Hear Before You Die.

== Background and recording ==
The album was written over the preceding year by the band, with Howard Devoto providing all of the lyrics. The two earliest songs, "Shot by Both Sides" and "The Light Pours Out of Me", were co-written with Devoto's former Buzzcocks bandmate Pete Shelley. The majority of the material on the album was written by Devoto in collaboration with guitarist and founding member John McGeoch. "Motorcade" was co-written with the group's keyboardist, the classically trained composer Bob Dickinson, who played with the group in mid-1977. The music for the album's final track, "Parade", was written by Dickinson's replacement, Dave Formula, with bassist Barry Adamson. "Definitive Gaze" was recorded for a Peel Session as "Real Life" on 14 February 1978.

Having toured much of the album through 1977 and early 1978, the group's then lineup of Devoto (vocals), McGeoch (guitar and saxophone), Adamson (bass), Formula (keyboards) and Martin Jackson (drums) recorded the album in sessions using Virgin's The Manor Mobile and at Abbey Road Studios between March and April 1978. The album was produced and engineered by John Leckie.

The original artwork and monoprint for the album were designed by Linder Sterling, with photography by Adrian Boot.

== Release ==
Real Life was released on LP and cassette in June 1978. It peaked at no. 29 on the UK Albums Chart. "Shot by Both Sides", the album's only single, peaked at no. 41 on the UK Singles Chart.

The album was reissued in remastered form by Virgin/EMI in 2007, along with the other three of the band's first four studio albums, and included four bonus tracks and liner notes by Kieron Tyler.

== Reception ==
Professional ratings
Review scores
Source	Rating
AllMusic	4.5/5 stars
The Encyclopedia of Popular Music	5/5 stars
The Guardian	5/5 stars
The Irish Times	3/5 stars
Mojo	4/5 stars
Q	4/5 stars
Record Mirror	4/5 stars
Sounds	4/5 stars
Stylus Magazine	B+
Uncut	5/5 stars

Real Life has received critical acclaim since its release. Jon Savage said in Sounds: "A commercial, quality rock album then, with deceptive depths. All is not revealed." The album was ranked at No. 20 among the top "Albums of the Year" for 1978 by NME, with "Shot by Both Sides" ranked at no. 9 among the year's top tracks.

Andy Kellman of AllMusic noted a perceived influence from Roxy Music, Iggy Pop and David Bowie, but felt that "instead of playing mindlessly sloppy variants of 'Hang on to Yourself,' Search and Destroy,' and 'Virginia Plain'" they were "inspired by the much more adventurous Low, The Idiot, and For Your Pleasure." In a mixed review,The Irish Times called it an "exuberant debut" but felt "it leant too heavily on Dave Formula's keyboards". The Guardian observed that "John McGeoch's unpredictable, distress-flare guitar solos and Dave Formula's bold, busy synths gave Devoto's sociopathic disgust a terrifying grandeur which influenced, among others, Radiohead and the Manic Street Preachers.

== Legacy ==
Real Life is included on several "best of" lists. It was included in The Guardian's "1,000 Albums to Hear Before You Die" list in 2007.Sounds also ranked it at No. 89 in its "100 Best Albums of All Time" list in 1986. In 2006, Uncut ranked it at No. 37 in its "100 Greatest Debut Albums" list.

== Track listing ==
All lyrics are written by Howard Devoto.

Side A
No.	Title	Music	Length
1.	"Definitive Gaze"	Devoto; John McGeoch	4:25
2.	"My Tulpa"	Devoto; McGeoch	4:47
3.	"Shot by Both Sides"	Devoto; Pete Shelley	4:01
4.	"Recoil"	Devoto; McGeoch	2:50
5.	"Burst"	Devoto	5:00
Total length:			21:03

Side B
No.	Title	Music	Length
6.	"Motorcade"	Devoto; Bob Dickinson	5:41
7.	"The Great Beautician in the Sky"	Devoto; McGeoch	4:56
8.	"The Light Pours Out of Me"	Devoto; McGeoch; Shelley	4:36
9.	"Parade"	Barry Adamson; Dave Formula	5:08
Total length:			20:21 41:24

2007 remastered edition bonus tracks
No.	Title	Music	Length
10.	"Shot by Both Sides" (Original single version)	Devoto; Shelley	4:01
11.	"My Mind Ain't So Open"	Devoto; McGeoch	2:18
12.	"Touch and Go"	Devoto; McGeoch	2:58
13.	"Goldfinger"	John Barry; Leslie Bricusse; Anthony Newley	3:50
Total length:			13:07 54:31

== Personnel ==
Magazine

- Howard Devoto – vocals
- John McGeoch – guitar, saxophone
- Barry Adamson – bass guitar
- Dave Formula – keyboards
- Martin Jackson – drums

Personnel

- John Leckie – production, engineering
- Mick Glossop and Magazine – production on "Shot by Both Sides" (original single version) and "My Mind Ain't So Open"
- Hayden Bendall – assistant engineer (Abbey Road)
- Adrian Boot – photography
- Linder – monoprint, design

== Charts ==
Chart (1978)	Peak position
UK Albums (Official Charts)	29
