= Malcolm Garrett =

British graphic designer (born 1956)

Malcolm Leslie Garrett MBE RDI FRSA (born 1956) is a British graphic designer, and creative director of Images&Co, a communications design consultancy based in London, UK. He is Ambassador for Manchester School of Art and co-founder of the annual Design Manchester festival, which has run since 2013.

He came to prominence in the late 70s and early 80s through his work for music artists such as Buzzcocks, Magazine, Duran Duran, Simple Minds, Heaven 17 and Peter Gabriel. He was an early convert to exploring the opportunities and challenges of design with digital technology, and his London studio was amongst the first of its peers to go totally digital in 1990.

== Overview ==
In 1998, Garrett received a Prince Philip Designers Prize nomination in recognition of his achievements in design for business and society. In 2003, he was named by Design Week as one of the "Hot 50 people making a difference in design" for his work as design ambassador. Garrett continues his design practice as Creative Director of IMAGES&Co based in London, and heads a team which develops leading-edge communications in lifestyle, culture, manufacturing, healthcare and education, through a connected approach to design and technology

In November 2013, Malcolm Garrett was elected Master of the Faculty of Royal Designers. He is a Fellow of the International Society of Typographic Designers (FISTD) and holds honorary Doctorates of Design from Robert Gordon University in Aberdeen, University of the Arts London, and London South Bank University.

He is a member of the Sir Misha Black Awards Committee, a founder member of the 5D World Builders at University of Southern California, and a former member of the BAFTA Interactive Entertainments Committee.

In 2015 he was one of the first ten designers to be inducted into the inaugural Design Week Hall of Fame and in 2017 he was named one of fifty Creative Leaders by Creative Review.

== Life and work ==
Garrett was born in Northwich, England, and attended St Ambrose College in Hale Barns. He studied typography at the University of Reading from 1974 until 1975 and graphic design at Manchester Polytechnic from 1975 until 1978. A fellow student of Garrett's at both St Ambrose College and Manchester Polytechnic was Peter Saville, a graphic designer who would also design prominent record sleeves in the late 1970s and early 1980s.

His first notable work was design for the punk rock group Buzzcocks, including the iconic cover for their 1977 single "Orgasm Addict". Until 1994, Garrett was the design director of Assorted iMaGes, the design company he had formed in 1977. His work there included "graphic identity, exhibition design, television graphics, and literature design." His work for musical artists included Magazine, Duran Duran, Boy George, Simple Minds, Peter Gabriel. and Heaven 17 The sleeves that Garrett designed for Duran Duran (from 1981 until 1986) include their first four albums (Duran Duran, Rio, Seven and the Ragged Tiger (together with Keith Breeden) and Arena) and their associated singles such as "Planet Earth", "Is There Something I Should Know?" and "The Reflex".

In the early 1990s, Garrett was increasingly attracted to working solely with digital technology and in 1994 he teamed up with Alasdair Scott to form AMXdigital (later called AMXstudios), an interactive media production company. Garrett left AMX when that company merged with Zinc to form Arnold Interactive in 2001.

Garrett worked at I-mmersion in Toronto but returned to London in 2005 to become Creative Director at Applied Information Group (AIG), subsequently collaborating with X-Communications in Dublin, and Cogapp in Brighton on a variety of projects. He left AIG in January 2011 to form the interactive media design consultancy 53K with Kasper de Graaf, his former partner at Assorted iMaGes. In January 2013 53K merged with Foreground Digital to form IMAGES&Co.

Garrett served on numerous committees including BAFTA Interactive Entertainment Committee and FontShop Type Board in Berlin. He currently sits on the RDI Executive Committee, Eye Magazine Editorial Board, the London Science Museum Advisory Board, and The Sir Misha Black Awards Committee. He was creative director of Dynamo, an online showcase and forum for the interactive media industry, and of the i-Design interactive media conference held at the London Design Festival from 2007-09. He is a founder member of the 5D World Builders at 5D Institute at USC in California. He is noted for his collaborative approach to design and his commitment to design education. Malcolm is an ambassador for the Manchester School of Art and co-curator of the annual Design Manchester festival.

Garrett was appointed Member of the Order of the British Empire (MBE) in the 2020 Birthday Honours for services to design. In 2021 he performed on stage with Heaven 17, providing live visuals to go alongside their music throughout the concerts

== Articles by Garrett ==
- "A Dearth of Typography" Baseline 13, edited by John Simmons, Chris Gray and Domenic Lippa, Esselte Letraset, 1990.
- "The Book is Dead?" Graphics World, 1991.
- "Multimedia, Who Needs It?" Baseline 18, with Alasdair Scott, edited by Mike Daines, Esselte Letraset, 1994.
- "The Widescreen Career of Alex McDowell" Eye, Number 60, Volume 15, edited by John L. Walters, 2006.
- "Conversation with Bill Moggridge" Eye, Number 66, Volume 17, edited by John L. Walters, 2007.
- "Apple iPhone" Design Week, edited by Lynda Relph-Knight, October 2007.
- "Why the iPad matters" Creative Review, CR Blog, edited by Patrick Bourgoyne, February 2010.
- "Out of Print" The Craft Council, October 2010.
- "The Legacy of Steve Jobs" State, October 2011.
- "A Refreshing Return to Clarity" Creative Review, CR Blog, edited by Patrick Bourgoyne, September 2013.
