= Swing Out Sister discography =

Cataloging of published recordings by Swing Out Sister

The discography of British group Swing Out Sister includes ten studio albums, two live albums, ten compilations, three multi-album box sets, five remix albums, and 23 singles, as well as a film soundtrack, an album of re-recordings, and five video albums.

== Albums ==
=== Studio albums ===
| Year | Title | Chart positions | | | | | | | | | Certifications |
| Year | Title | UK | AUS | GER | IT | NL | NZ | SWE | SWI | US | Certifications |
|---|---|---|---|---|---|---|---|---|---|---|---|
| 1987 | It's Better to Travel: Released: 11 May 1987; Label: Mercury | 1 | 23 | 15 | 11 | 3 | 13 | 39 | 17 | 40 | BPI: Platinum |
| 1989 | Kaleidoscope World: Released: 8 May 1989; Label: Fontana | 9 | 106 | 40 | 12 | 30 | — | — | — | 61 | BPI: Gold |
| 1992 | Get in Touch with Yourself: Released: 4 May 1992; Label: Fontana | 27 | 141 | — | — | 35 | — | — | — | 113 | |
| 1994 | The Living Return: Released: September 1994; Label: Fontana | — | — | — | — | — | — | — | — | — | |
| 1997 | Shapes and Patterns: Released: March 1997; Label: Mercury | — | — | — | — | — | — | — | — | — | |
| 1999 | Filth and Dreams (Note: Filth and Dreams was originally released only in Japan.): Released: 17 March 1999; Label: Mercury | — | — | — | — | — | — | — | — | — | |
| 2001 | Somewhere Deep in the Night: Released: May 2001; Label: Universal/Liberty | — | — | — | — | — | — | — | — | — | |
| 2004 | Where Our Love Grows: Released: 19 October 2004; Label: Universal/Liberty/Shanachie | — | — | — | — | — | — | — | — | — | |
| 2008 | Beautiful Mess: Released: February 2008; Label: Avex/Shanachie/Universal Records/Edel | — | — | — | — | — | — | — | — | — (Note: Beautiful Mess peaked at number 5 on the Billboard Jazz Albums chart.) | |
| 2017 | Almost Persuaded: Released: November 2017; Label: Self-released/Sony | — | — | — | — | — | — | — | — | — (Note: Almost Persuaded peaked at number 6 on the Billboard Jazz Albums chart.) | |
"—" denotes a recording that did not chart or was not released in that territory.

=== Compilation albums ===
- 1990: Swing Out Fever (Note: Released only in the Philippines.)
- 1996: Best of Swing Out Sister
- 2001: Breakout: The Very Best of Swing Out Sister
- 2001: 20th Century Masters – The Millennium Collection: The Best of Swing Out Sister (Note: Released only in the United States.)
- 2002: Cafe Orange: Swing Out Sister CAFE Best (Note: Released only in Japan.)
- 2003: The Ultimate Collection (3CD version) (Note: Released only in the Netherlands and Germany.)
- 2004: The Ultimate Collection (2CD version)
- 2008: Best Selection (Note: Released only in Japan. Released in 2009 with a different track listing.)
- 2010: Super Best
- 2014: The Essential Swing Out Sister

=== Live albums ===
- 1993: Live at the Jazz Cafe
- 2005: Live in Tokyo (Note: Released in the United States as simply Live.)

=== Box sets ===
- 1991: Splendid Collection (Note: Released only in Japan. Includes It's Better to Travel, Kaleidoscope World, Get in Touch with Yourself and a remix disc.)
- 2022: Blue Mood, Breakout & Beyond (Note: Includes It's Better to Travel, Kaleidoscope World, Get in Touch with Yourself, Live at the Jazz Café and four remix discs.)
- 2025: Certain Shades of Limelight (Note: Includes The Big Elsewhere, Shapes and Patterns, Filth and Dreams, Somewhere Deep in the Night, Where Our Love Grows and two remix discs.)

=== Remix albums ===
- 1987: Another Non-Stop Sister
- 1990: Swing³ (Note: Released only in Japan. Title transliterated into Japanese as Swing, Swing, Swing.)
- 1992: Swing Out Singles
- 1996: The Big Elsewhere (Note: Released only in Japan. Consists solely of remixes of "Now You're Not Here".)
- 2018: Almost Persuaded (instrumental version)

=== Other albums ===
- 2009: Les Étrangers (soundtrack)
- 2010: Private View (re-recordings of previously released songs)
- 2015: Rushes (work-in-progress material from Almost Persuaded, released to PledgeMusic backers)

== Singles ==
| Year | Song | Chart positions | | | | | | | | | | Certifications | Album |
| Year | Song | UK | AUS | GER | IRE | IT | NL | NZ | US | US AC | US Dance | Certifications | Album |
|---|---|---|---|---|---|---|---|---|---|---|---|---|---|
| 1985 | "Blue Mood" | — | — | — | — | — | — | — | — | — | — | | It's Better to Travel |
| 1986 | "Breakout" | 4 | 12 | 27 | 6 | — | 34 | 4 | 6 | 1 | 12 | BPI: Silver | It's Better to Travel |
| 1987 | "Surrender" | 7 | 78 | 48 | 3 | 16 | 15 | 13 | — | 37 | 22 | | It's Better to Travel |
| 1987 | "Twilight World" | 32 | — | — | 26 | 17 | 39 | — | 31 | 7 | 9 | | It's Better to Travel |
| 1987 | "Fooled by a Smile" | 43 | — | — | — | — | — | — | — | — | — | | It's Better to Travel |
| 1989 | "You on My Mind" | 28 | 114 | 51 | 26 | 11 | 28 | 32 | — | 23 | — | | Kaleidoscope World |
| 1989 | "Where in the World" | 47 | 168 | — | — | — | — | — | — | — | — | | Kaleidoscope World |
| 1989 | "Waiting Game" (U.S./Canada only) | — | — | — | — | — | — | — | 86 | 6 | 33 | | Kaleidoscope World |
| 1989 | "Forever Blue" | 80 | — | — | — | — | — | — | — | — | — | | Kaleidoscope World |
| 1989 | "The Windmills of Your Mind" (Japan only) | — | — | — | — | — | — | — | — | — | — | | Splendid Collection |
| 1992 | "Am I the Same Girl?" | 21 | 123 | 53 | — | 8 | 15 | — | 45 | 1 | — | | Get in Touch with Yourself |
| 1992 | "Notgonnachange" | 49 | — | — | — | — | — | — | — | 22 | 21 | | Get in Touch with Yourself |
| 1994 | "La La (Means I Love You)" | 37 | — | — | — | — | — | — | — | — | — | | The Living Return; Four Weddings and a Funeral soundtrack |
| 1995 | "Better Make It Better" | — | — | — | — | — | — | — | — | — | — | | The Living Return |
| 1996 | "Now You're Not Here" (Japan only) | — | — | — | — | — | — | — | — | — | — | | The Big Elsewhere |
| 1996 | "Heaven Only Knows" | — | — | — | — | — | — | — | — | — | — | | The Best of Swing Out Sister |
| 1997 | "Somewhere in the World" | — | — | — | — | — | — | — | — | 30 | — | | Shapes and Patterns |
| 1997 | "We Could Make It Happen" | — | — | — | — | — | — | — | — | — | — | | Shapes and Patterns |
| 1999 | "Who's Been Sleeping" (Japan only) | — | — | — | — | — | — | — | — | — | — | | Filth and Dreams |
| 2001 | "Through the Sky" | — | — | — | — | — | — | — | — | — | — | | Somewhere Deep in the Night |
| 2004 | "Love Won't Let You Down" | — | — | — | — | — | — | — | — | — | — | | Where Our Love Grows |
| 2007 | "Secret Love" | — | — | — | — | — | — | — | — | — | — | | Beautiful Mess |
| 2007 | "Something Every Day" | — | — | — | — | — | — | — | — | — | — | | Beautiful Mess |
"—" denotes a recording that did not chart or was not released in that territory.

== Video albums ==
| Year | Title | Album details |
|---|---|---|
| 1987 | And Why Not | Music video collection; Label: PolyGram (UK/Europe/US); Format: VHS, CDV (UK/US) |
| 1989 | Kaleidoscope World | Music video collection; Label: PolyGram (UK/Europe/Japan/US), VideoArts (Japan); Format: VHS, LD (Japan) |
| 1992 | It's Better to Watch | Music video collection; LaserDisc reissued in 1996; Label: Fontana/PolyGram (Japan); Format: VHS, LD |
| 2012 | Travelogue: The Swing Out Sister Video Collection | Music video collection; Label: Mercury; Format: DL |
| 2012 | Tokyo Stories | Live concert; Included as a bonus disc with Private View in the United States and mainland Europe; Label: Self-released (UK), Yamaha (Japan); Format: DVD |
