= Best of Swing Out Sister =

Greatest hits album by Swing Out Sister
- Released: 1996
- Genres: Sophisti-pop; jazz pop
- Labels: Fontana Records, Mercury Records

Swing Out Sister chronology
The Living Return (1994)	Best of Swing Out Sister (1996)	Shapes and Patterns (1997)

Best of is a 1996 retrospective compilation album by Swing Out Sister, containing their successful singles spanning the years 1986 through 1996. It is their first compilation album—and last Fontana Records album.

== Track listing ==
CD & cassette version

1. "Breakout" (Andy Connell, Corinne Drewery, Martin Jackson) – 3:46
2. "Am I the Same Girl" (E. Record, S. Sanders) – 4:07
3. "You on My Mind" (A. Connell, C. Drewery, Paul Staveley O'Duffy) – 3:32
4. "Twilight World" (Edit) (A. Connell, C. Drewery, M. Jackson) – 4:05
5. "Where in The World?" (A. Connell, C. Drewery) – 5:33
6. "La-La (Means I Love You)" (UK Guitar Edit) (T. Bell, W. Hart) – 3:59
7. "Ordinary People" (A. Connell, C. Drewery) – 6:22
8. "Get in Touch with Yourself" (A. Connell, C. Drewery, P. S. O'Duffy) – 5:08
9. "Surrender" (A. Connell, C. Drewery, M. Jackson) – 3:53
10. "Heaven Only Knows" (A. Connell, C. Drewery) – 4:09
11. "Better Make It Better" (Edit) (A. Connell, C. Drewery) – 3:51
12. "Notgonnachange" (O' Duffy 7" Mix) (A. Connell, C. Drewery) – 4:20
13. "Fooled by a Smile" (A. Connell, C. Drewery, M. Jackson) – 4:06
14. "Waiting Game" (A. Connell, C. Drewery) – 4:15
15. "Forever Blue" (A. Connell, C. Drewery) – 4:17
16. "Windmills of Your Mind" (M. Legrand, A. Bergman, M. Bergman) – 2:54

CD Japan version

1. "Now You're Not Here" (Original Single Mix) (A. Connell, C. Drewery, P. S. O'Duffy) – 4:43
2. "Breakout" (Andy Connell, Corinne Drewery, Martin Jackson) – 3:46
3. "Am I the Same Girl" (E. Record, S. Sanders) – 4:07
4. "You on My Mind" (A. Connell, C. Drewery, Paul Staveley O'Duffy) – 3:32
5. "Twilight World" (Edit) (A. Connell, C. Drewery, M. Jackson) – 4:05
6. "Where in The World?" (A. Connell, C. Drewery) – 5:33
7. "La-La (Means I Love You)" (UK Guitar Edit) (T. Bell, W. Hart) – 3:59
8. "Ordinary People" (A. Connell, C. Drewery) – 6:22
9. "Get in Touch with Yourself" (A. Connell, C. Drewery, P. S. O'Duffy) – 5:08
10. "Surrender" (A. Connell, C. Drewery, M. Jackson) – 3:53
11. "Heaven Only Knows" (Denzil Foster, Thomas McElroy) – 4:09
12. "Better Make It Better" (Edit) (A. Connell, C. Drewery) – 3:51
13. "Notgonnachange" (O' Duffy 7" Mix) (A. Connell, C. Drewery) – 4:20
14. "Fooled by a Smile" (A. Connell, C. Drewery, M. Jackson) – 4:06
15. "Waiting Game" (A. Connell, C. Drewery) – 4:15
16. "Forever Blue" (A. Connell, C. Drewery) – 4:17

== Personnel ==
Swing Out Sister

- Andy Connell – keyboards
- Corinne Drewery – lead vocals

== Certifications and sales ==
Region	Certification	Certified units/sales
Japan (RIAJ)	2× Platinum	400,000^{^}
^{^} Shipments figures based on certification alone.
