= Breakout (Swing Out Sister album) =

Compilation album by Swing Out Sister
- Released: 2001
- Recorded: 1984–1992
- Length: 74:56
- Label: Spectrum Music

Swing Out Sister chronology
Best of Swing Out Sister (1996)	Breakout (2001)	20th Century Masters - The Millenium Collection: The Best of Swing Out Sister (2001)

Breakout is a compilation album by English pop group Swing Out Sister in 2001. The album features many of the band's singles as well as album tracks and B-sides.

== Track listing ==
All tracks written by Swing Out Sister, except where noted.

1. "Breakout"
2. "Fooled by a Smile" (7" Remix)
3. "Blue Mood"
4. "Communion"
5. "Another Lost Weekend" (Edit)
6. "Fever"
7. "Coney Island Man" (Connell, Drewery)
8. "Tainted"
9. "Am I the Same Girl" (Record, Sanders)
10. "Precious Words" (Connell, Drewery)
11. "Between Strangers"
12. "Get in Touch with Yourself" (Connell, Drewery, O'Duffy)
13. "Who Let The Love Out?" (Connell, Drewery)
14. "Circulate" (Connell, Drewery)
15. "Notgonnachange" (O'Duffy 7" Mix) (Connell, Drewery, O'Duffy)
16. "Wake Me Up When It's Over"
17. "Surrender" (7" Remix)
18. "The Kaleidoscope Affair" (Connell, Drewery)

== Personnel ==
Swing Out Sister

- Andy Connell – keyboards
- Corinne Drewery – lead vocals
