= Shapes and Patterns =

Studio album by Swing Out Sister
- Released: 5 March 1997
- Recorded: July 1995 – May 1996
- Genres: Synth-pop; jazz pop; sophisti-pop; pop-soul; R&B
- Length: 52:14
- Label: Mercury
- Producer: Paul Staveley O'Duffy

Swing Out Sister chronology
Best of Swing Out Sister (1996)	Shapes and Patterns (1997)	Filth and Dreams (1999)

Professional ratings
Review scores
Source	Rating
AllMusic	3/5 stars

Shapes and Patterns is the fifth studio album by British pop group Swing Out Sister. It was first released in Japan in March 1997 on Mercury Records, and in Europe and the United States the following year. Producer Paul Staveley O'Duffy, who co-wrote half of the songs on the album, was back at the helm. As an orchestra was once again employed (led by Gavyn Wright), the lush arrangements characteristic of Kaleidoscope World (1989) resurfaced. The album features the track "Now You're Not Here" which was used as the theme to the Japanese programme Mahiru No Tsuki, as well as a reworked version of "Better Make It Better" which had featured on their previous studio album, The Living Return (1994). The album was promoted with the singles "Somewhere in the World" and "We Could Make It Happen."

This album would also mark the beginning of the group's collaborations with Japanese musicians in their studio sessions.

The liner notes, written by composer/singer-songwriter Mary Edwards, points out that the influences of Burt Bacharach, Jimmy Webb, and John Barry are perceptible in the string arrangements and Latin rhythms, as well as Minnie Riperton, Rotary Connection and The 5th Dimension. In an interview with Paul Sexton of Billboard magazine, a marketing executive from Mercury described the challenge associated with promoting the album in the U.S. due to the evolution of the group's music: "When you have a band like Swing Out Sister, you'd have a tough time pinpointing their sound. It's pop, it's urban, it's adult, it's jazz. Europe and Japan don't adhere to those rules as much as America does. It crosses over so many lines, and that's where Swing Out's strength is."

== Track listing ==
1. "Somewhere in the World" (Andy Connell, Corinne Drewery, Paul Staveley O'Duffy) – 3:45
2. "Here and Now" (A. Connell, C. Drewery, P. S. O'Duffy) – 5:06
3. "We Could Make It Happen" (A. Connell, C. Drewery, P. S. O'Duffy) – 5:13
4. "Shapes and Patterns" (A. Connell, C. Drewery, P. S. O'Duffy) – 0:52
5. "Better Make It Better" (A. Connell, C. Drewery) – 5:23
6. "Something Out of This World" (A. Connell, C. Drewery, P. S. O'Duffy) – 5:02
7. "Joe Meek's Cat" (C. Drewery, A. Connell, P. S. O'Duffy) – 0:23
8. "Stoned Soul Picnic" (Laura Nyro) – 5:08
9. "You Already Know" (A. Connell, C. Drewery, P. S. O'Duffy) – 4:34
10. "Always" (A. Connell, C. Drewery, P. S. O'Duffy) – 5:05
11. "Now You're Not Here" (A. Connell, C. Drewery, P. S. O'Duffy) – 4:36
12. "Icy Cold as Winter" (A. Connell, C. Drewery, P. S. O'Duffy) – 5:13
13. "Shapes and Patterns" (Reprise) (A. Connell, C. Drewery, P. S. O'Duffy) – 1:23

== Personnel ==
Swing Out Sister

- Andy Connell – keyboards
- Corinne Drewery – lead vocals

Additional musicians

- Tim Cansfield – guitars
- Luís Jardim – bass guitar, percussion
- Andrew Small – drums (1, 2, 5)
- Gota Yashiki – drums (3, 4, 6–13), rhythm programming (3, 8, 9)
- Steve Sidelnyk – rhythm programming (4, 6, 9, 13)
- Larry Williams – saxophones (1, 4, 9, 13)
- Snake Davis – saxophones (3, 6), flute (3, 6), horn arrangements (3, 6)
- Hideyo Takakuwa – flute (11)
- Osamu Koike – saxophones (11)
- Takuo Yamamoto – saxophones (11)
- Bill Reichenbach, Jr. – trombone (1, 4, 9, 13)
- Fayyaz Virji – trombone (3, 6)
- Yoichi Murata – trombone (11), bass trombone (11), horn arrangements (11)
- Gary Grant – trumpet (1, 4, 9, 13), flugelhorn (1, 4, 9, 13)
- Jerry Hey – trumpet (1, 4, 9, 13), flugelhorn (1, 4, 9, 13), horn arrangements (1, 4, 9, 13)
- Steve Sidwell – trumpet (3, 6), flugelhorn (3, 6)
- Toshio Araki – trumpet (11), flugelhorn (11)
- Masahiko Sugasaka – trumpet (11), flugelhorn (11)
- Robin Smith – string arrangements (1, 2, 8), string conductor (1, 2, 8)
- Gavyn Wright – string conductor (1, 2, 8)
- The London Session Orchestra – strings (1, 2, 8)
- George Chandler – backing vocals
- Leon Daniels – backing vocals
- Derek Green – backing vocals
- Stevie Lange – backing vocals
- Sylvia Mason-James – backing vocals
- Melodie Sexton – backing vocals
- Beverley Skeete – backing vocals
- Lance Ellington – backing vocals (7)
- Miriam Stockley – backing vocals (7)
- Frank Campbell – vocal arrangements (7)

=== Production ===
- Bas Hartong – A&R
- Paul Staveley O'Duffy – producer, mixing
- Ben Darlow – engineer
- Jon Bailey – assistant engineer
- Steve Cook – assistant engineer
- Ben Georgiades – assistant engineer
- Scott Howland – assistant engineer
- Valerie Jaquot – assistant engineer
- Tatsuya Shimokawa – assistant engineer
- Yutaka Shimoyama – assistant engineer
- Ibi Tijani – assistant engineer
- Yutaka Uematsu – assistant engineer
- P. R. Brown – design, digital illustration
- Dah Len – photography
- Paul E. Swanson – additional photography
- Bennett Freed – management

== Sales and certifications ==
Certifications for Shapes and Patterns
Region	Certification	Certified units/sales
Japan (RIAJ)	Gold	100,000^{^}
^{^} Shipments figures based on certification alone.
