= Somewhere Deep in the Night =

Studio album by Swing Out Sister
- Released: May 2001 (Japan); March 2002 (Europe)
- Studios: Aurora Studios (London, UK)
- Length: 46:58
- Labels: Universal (Japan); Liberty (Europe)
- Producer: Paul Staveley O'Duffy

Swing Out Sister chronology
Filth and Dreams (1999)	Somewhere Deep in the Night (2001)	Where Our Love Grows (2004)

Singles from Somewhere Deep in the Night
- 1. "Through the Sky" Released: 2001

Professional ratings
Review scores
Source	Rating
AllMusic	4/5 stars

Somewhere Deep in the Night is the seventh studio album by the British pop group Swing Out Sister. Produced by longtime collaborator Paul Staveley O'Duffy, the album was first released in Japan in 2001, with a European release the following year.

== Composition ==
Since the group's second album, 1989's Kaleidoscope World, the group has consisted of Corinne Drewery on lead vocals and multi-instrumentalist Andy Connell. On this album, Connell provides keyboards, synthesizer, guitar and accordion. Other contributing musicians on the album include Tim Cansfield (guitar), Nigel Hitchcock (tenor saxophone), Noel Langley (trumpet and fluegelhorn), and Jody Linscott (percussion). In addition to Connell, other backing vocalists include Beverley Skeete, Dee Lewis, Gina Foster and Stephanie de Sykes.

The track Alpine Crossing is a reinterpretation of the 1972 track Hot Heels by Barbara Moore and De Wolfe Music.

== Critical reception ==
AllMusic gave Somewhere Deep in the Night four stars out of a possible five, stating that the album "is a very strong album from the duo, packed full of sweeping, melancholy tunes". Reviewer Nick Dedina continues by describing how the album "...uses its sumptuous, melodramatic arrangements to sugar rather bleak songs of confusion and lost love...rather than simply dazzle the listener with retro-schmaltz."

== Track listing ==
1. "Through the Sky" (Andy Connell, Corinne Drewery, Paul Staveley O'Duffy) – 3:55
2. "Will We Find Love?" (A. Connell, C. Drewery, P. S. O'Duffy) – 3:55
3. "Somewhere Deep in the Night" (A. Connell, C. Drewery, P. S. O'Duffy) – 4:29
4. "The Vital Thing" (A. Connell, C. Drewery, P. S. O'Duffy, Nigel Hitchcock) – 2:48
5. "What Kind of Fool Are You?" (A. Connell, C. Drewery, P. S. O'Duffy) – 4:04
6. "Suspended in Time" (A. Connell, C. Drewery, P. S. O'Duffy) – 1:39
7. "Alpine Crossing" (A. Connell, C. Drewery, P. S. O'Duffy) – 3:07
8. "Fool Tag" (A. Connell, C. Drewery, P. S. O'Duffy) – 0:27
9. "Where the Hell Did I Go Wrong?" (A. Connell, C. Drewery, P. S. O'Duffy) – 4:10
10. "Non E Vero Ma Ci Credo" (A. Connell, C. Drewery, P. S. O'Duffy) – 4:08
11. "Touch Me Now" (A. Connell, C. Drewery, P. S. O'Duffy) – 3:56
12. "The Vital Thing – Take B" (A. Connell, C. Drewery, P. S. O'Duffy, N. Hitchcock) – 2:27
13. "Where Do I Go?" (A. Connell, C. Drewery, P. S. O'Duffy) – 4:23
14. "Now Listen to Me" (A. Connell, C. Drewery, P. S. O'Duffy) – 3:30

== Personnel ==
Swing Out Sister

- Andy Connell – acoustic piano, keyboards, synthesizers, accordion, guitars, Fender bass, vibraphone, backing vocals
- Corinne Drewery – lead vocals

Additional Musicians

- Paul Staveley O'Duffy – computer and rhythm programming, backing vocals
- Tim Cansfield – guitars (1, 2, 3, 7), backing vocals
- Matt Becker – guitars (5)
- Anton Drewery – guitars (13)
- Jody Linscott – percussion, vocal ensemble (3)
- Nigel Hitchcock – tenor saxophone
- Noel Langley – trumpet, flugelhorn
- Stephanie de Sykes – backing vocals
- Gina Foster – backing vocals
- Dee Lewis – backing vocals
- Beverley Skeete – backing vocals
- Myke Wilson – scat (3)
- Yasmin Sarkic – voice (4)
- Gersende Giorgio – voice (6)

Vocal ensemble (Track 3)

- Tim Cansfield, Andy Connell, Corinne Drewery, Kaysi Foster, Coco Linscott, Kachina Linscott-Dechert, Paul Staveley O'Duffy and Ayu Sekioka

=== Production ===
- Paul Staveley O'Duffy – producer, engineer
- James Martin – photography
- Swing Out Sister – design
- The Red Room – design
- Bennett Freed – management
- Geoff Kite – management
