= Get in Touch with Yourself =

Studio album by Swing Out Sister
- Released: June 1992 (UK); September 1992 (US)
- Genres: Synth-pop; lounge; jazz; soul
- Length: 56:59
- Label: Fontana
- Producer: Paul Staveley O'Duffy

Swing Out Sister chronology
Kaleidoscope World (1989)	Get in Touch with Yourself (1992)	The Living Return (1994)

Get in Touch with Yourself is the third studio album by the British pop group Swing Out Sister. The album was released on Fontana Records in 1992 and was produced by Paul Staveley O'Duffy.

== Lineup and musical style ==
For the recording of Get in Touch with Yourself, Swing Out Sister consisted of Corinne Drewery on lead vocals and Andy Connell on keyboards. This was the first Swing Out Sister studio album in which original member Martin Jackson did not contribute, as he left the band during the recording of the Kaleidoscope World album in 1989. Luís Jardim provided percussion to many of the tracks on this album in Jackson's absence, and additional horn players and orchestration were incorporated into the production as well.

Get in Touch with Yourself combines elements of various genres of pop music, while also including more vintage styles such as lounge. Most songs on the record incorporate sounds from smooth jazz, soul and dance. Lead singer Drewery was quoted as saying that she typically enjoyed music with more of a retro feel: "I find it difficult to form opinions about a lot of modern music because my head's buried in the past. A lot of my favourite records seem to have been picked up in the discount rack at Woolworths. I'll be quite happy if our records end up in the Woollies bargain bin in 10 years time."

== Commercial performance ==
In the UK, Get in Touch with Yourself was released in June 1992, and it peaked at No. 27 on the UK Albums Chart. In the US, the album's release was delayed until September 1992, and there it rose to No. 113 on the Billboard 200 album chart.

The first single taken from Get in Touch with Yourself was a cover version of the 1960s song "Am I the Same Girl", which had first been recorded by the American soul singer Barbara Acklin, then later by British singer Dusty Springfield. Swing Out Sister's version of the song reached No. 21 on the UK singles chart and No. 45 on the US Billboard Hot 100 chart. In addition, this song became the group's second chart-topper on the US adult contemporary chart, following "Breakout" from 1987. The single was a hit in Japan as well, where the band had begun to achieve a great deal of acclaim for their music.

The follow-up to "Am I the Same Girl" was "Notgonnachange", which reached No. 49 in the UK and No. 22 on the US adult contemporary chart. This song was subsequently remixed by Frankie Knuckles, and the dance mix of "Notgonnachange" peaked at No. 21 on the US Hot Dance Club Play chart during the summer of 1992.

== Reviews ==
Professional ratings
Review scores
Source	Rating
AllMusic	3/5 stars

Spin magazine recommended the album in its June 1992 issue, saying that "Drewery is as vibrant, perky, and comfortable in her area of expertise as ever. Swing Out Sister remain as sweet and silly as they always were." Reflex magazine reacted by saying that "Swing Out Sister rank near the top of the UK's cosmo-jazzy-pop firmament...[they're] excellent in their chosen field."

== Track listing ==
CD & Cassette Version

1. "Get in Touch with Yourself" (Andy Connell, Corinne Drewery, Paul Staveley O'Duffy) – 5:08
2. "Am I the Same Girl?" (Eugene Record, Sonny Sanders) – 4:07
3. "Incomplete Without You" (Connell, Drewery) – 4:43
4. "Everyday Crime" (Connell, Drewery, O'Duffy) – 5:03
5. "Circulate" (Connell, Drewery, O'Duffy) – 4:58
6. "Who Let the Love Out?" (Connell, Drewery) – 4:40
7. "Understand" small (Connell, Drewery) – 5:16
8. "Notgonnachange" (Connell, Drewery) – 4:56
9. "Don't Say the Word" (Connell, Drewery) – 4:06
10. "Love Child" (Connell, Drewery) – 4:57
11. "I Can Hear You but I Can't See You" (Connell, Drewery) – 4:04
12. "Everyday Crime" (Instrumental) (Connell, Drewery, O'Duffy) – 5:02

CD track listing (from the US Version)

1. "Get in Touch with Yourself" (Andy Connell, Corinne Drewery, Paul Staveley O'Duffy) – 5:08
2. "Notgonnachange" (Connell, Drewery) – 4:56
3. "Am I the Same Girl?" (Eugene Record, Sonny Sanders) – 4:07
4. "Everyday Crime" (Connell, Drewery, O'Duffy) – 5:03
5. "Who Let the Love Out?" (Connell, Drewery) – 4:40
6. "I Can Hear You but I Can't See You" (Instrumental) (Connell, Drewery) – 4:04
7. "Understand" (Connell, Drewery) – 5:16
8. "Circulate" (Connell, Drewery, O'Duffy) – 4:58
9. "Love Child" (Connell, Drewery) – 4:57
10. "Incomplete Without You" (Connell, Drewery) – 4:42
11. "Don't Say the Word" (Connell, Drewery) – 4:06
12. "Everyday Crime" (Instrumental) (Connell, Drewery, O'Duffy) – 5:02

== Personnel ==
Swing Out Sister

- Corinne Drewery – lead vocals (1–5, 7–10), musical arrangements
- Andy Connell – keyboards, musical arrangements, vocal shouts (7)

Musicians

- Paul Staveley O'Duffy – musical arrangements (1–10, 12)
- Simon Duffy – computer and rhythm programming
- Max Hochrad – additional programming (7)
- Tim Cansfield – guitars
- Derrick Johnson – vocal asides (2), bass guitar (4, 6), vocal shouts (7), wah-wah bass (11), percussion (11)
- Luís Jardim – percussion
- Chris Manis – percussion (11)
- Nigel Hitchcock – sax solo (1)
- Gary Barnacle – saxophones (2, 4, 6), flute (2, 4, 6)
- Snake Davis – saxophones (2, 4, 6), flute (2, 4, 6), flute solo, horn arrangements (2, 4, 6)
- Vince Sullivan – trombone (2, 4, 6)
- Noel Langley – trumpet (2, 4, 6), flugelhorn (2, 4, 6)
- John Thirkell – trumpet (2, 4, 6), flugelhorn (2, 4, 6), trumpet solo (7)
- Will Malone – orchestra arrangements and conductor (4, 8)
- Gavyn Wright – orchestra leader (4, 8)
- Erica Harrold – backing vocals (1–5, 7–10)
- Beverly Skeete – backing vocals (1–5, 7–10)
- Myke Wilson – vocal asides (2), vocal shouts (7)
- Gordon Ellington – vocal shouts (7)
- Rodney Masen – vocal shouts (7)

== Production ==
- Paul Staveley O'Duffy – producer (1–10, 12), mixing (1–10, 12)
- Stuart James – producer (11)
- Swing Out Sister – producer (11)
- Lee Curle – recording engineer
- Heidi Cannavo – assistant engineer
- Ronan Jal – assistant engineer
- Richard Lowe – assistant engineer
- Rick Simpson – assistant engineer
- Ren Swan – mixing (11)
- Laurence Dunmore – art direction, design
- Enrique Badulescu – photography
- Morrison O'Donnell Limited – management

Studios

- Recorded at Swanyard Studios, Mayfair Studios and The Hit Factory (London, UK); Suite 16 Studios (Rochdale, UK).
- Mixed at Sarm West Studios (London, UK) and Suite 16 Studios.

== Charts ==
Chart (1992)	Peak position
Australian Albums (ARIA)	141
Dutch Albums (Album Top 100)	35
UK Albums (Official Charts)	27
US Billboard 200	113
