= Surrender (Swing Out Sister song) =

1987 single

Single by Swing Out Sister

from the album It's Better to Travel
- B-side: "Who's to Blame"
- Released: 2 January 1987
- Recorded: 1986
- Genre: Synth-pop
- Label: Mercury Records
- Songwriter: Andy Connell / Corinne Drewery / Martin Jackson
- Producer: Paul Staveley O'Duffy

Swing Out Sister singles chronology
"Breakout" (1986)	"Surrender" (1987)	"Twilight World" (1987)

"Surrender" is a 1987 single released by British pop act Swing Out Sister from their debut album, It's Better to Travel. It was issued as the follow-up to the successful single, "Breakout". The song peaked at No. 7 on the UK Singles Chart in January 1987, logging four weeks in the top ten.

Over a year after its initial release, remixes of "Surrender" reached the U.S. Billboard Hot Dance Club Play chart, peaking at No. 22 in May 1988.

The song features a trumpet solo performed by John Thirkell.

== Remixes ==
UK 7" single

1. "Surrender" (7" version)
  As featured on the UK Best of CD album Breakout.
2. "Who's to Blame"

UK 12" single

1. "Surrender" (Stuff Gun Mix)
  Also available from the CD releases of It's Better to Travel & the Japanese CD album Swing 3.

UK 12" remix single

1. "Surrender" (Roadrunner Mix)
  As featured on the Japanese CD album Another Non-Stop Sister.

US 12" promo single

1. "Surrender" (Pop Stand Mix)
  As featured on the "US 12" single".

Other version

1. "Surrender" (album version)
  Also available from the CD album It's Better to Travel & Best of Swing Out Sister.

== Charts ==
=== Weekly charts ===
Chart (1987)	Peak position
Australia (Kent Music Report)	23
Belgium (Ultratop 50 Flanders)	14
Ireland (IRMA)	3
Italy Airplay (Music & Media)	5
Netherlands (Dutch Top 40)	7
Netherlands (Single Top 100)	15
New Zealand (Recorded Music NZ)	13
UK Singles (OCC)	7
West Germany (GfK)	48

=== Year-end charts ===
Chart (1987)	Position
Netherlands (Dutch Top 40)	85
