= Now You're Not Here =

Single by Swing Out Sister

from the album Shapes and Patterns
- Released: 1997
- Recorded: April 1996
- Genre: Jazz, pop
- Label: Mercury Records
- Songwriter(s): Andy Connell, Corinne Drewery
- Producer(s): Paul Staveley O'Duffy

Swing Out Sister singles chronology
"Somewhere In The World" (1997)	"Now You're Not Here" (1997)

"Now You're Not Here" is a song from Swing Out Sister's fifth album Shapes and Patterns, was used as the theme to the Japanese TV programme "Mahiru No Tsuki", and received a Japanese 'Grand Prix' (the equivalent of a Grammy Award) for best international single in 1997. Aside from the lead track, all mixes on The Big Elsewhere EP were instrumental, and were especially recorded for this release.

== Versions ==
1. "Now You're Not Here" (Album Version) (Taken from the album "Shapes and Patterns")
2. "Now You're Not Here" (Vocal Mix) (Taken from the maxi single "The Big Elsewhere")
3. "Now You're Not Here" (Daddy Macks Back Mix) (Taken from the maxi single "The Big Elsewhere")
4. "Now You're Not Here" (Da-Li-Da Mix) (Taken from the maxi single "The Big Elsewhere")
5. "Now You're Not Here" (So Low Mix) (Taken from the maxi single "The Big Elsewhere")
6. "Now You're Not Here" (Water And Water Mix) (Taken from the maxi single "The Big Elsewhere")
7. "Now You're Not Here" (Desolate Shores Mix) (Taken from the maxi single "The Big Elsewhere")
8. "Now You're Not Here" (Deep Siesta Mix) (Taken from the maxi single "The Big Elsewhere")
9. "Now You're Not Here" (Original Single Mix)
10. "Now You're Not Here" (TV Mix)
11. "Now You're Not Here" (Cool Mix)
12. "Now You're Not Here" (Original Karaoke)
13. "Now You're Not Here" (Instrumental)

== Certifications and sales ==
Region	Certification	Certified units/sales
Japan (RIAJ)	3× Platinum	300,000^{^}
^{^} Shipments figures based on certification alone.
