= Twilight World =

Single by Swing Out Sister

from the album It's Better to Travel
- B-side: "Another Lost Weekend"
- Released: 6 April 1987 (UK); December 1987 (US)
- Recorded: 1986
- Genre: Sophisti-pop
- Label: Mercury Records
- Songwriters: Andy Connell; Corinne Drewery; Martin Jackson
- Producer: Paul Staveley O'Duffy

Swing Out Sister singles chronology
"Surrender" (1987)	"Twilight World" (1987)	"Fooled by a Smile" (1987)

"Twilight World" is a song by the British pop act Swing Out Sister. The song is included on their debut album, It's Better to Travel. It was written by the members of the group at that time, Andy Connell, Corinne Drewery and Martin Jackson.

The song was released as a single in the UK on 6 April 1987, and it peaked at #32 on the UK Singles Chart in May of that year. "Twilight World" was the second release from It's Better to Travel in the U.S., following "Breakout", and it first appeared on the Billboard Hot Dance Club Play chart in December 1987. It became the group's highest charting hit on that survey, reaching #9 in early 1988. The song also made the top 40 on the Billboard Hot 100 chart, peaking at #31 during February 1988.

This song was remixed a number of times, and the album version is in fact a remix entitled "Superb, Superb mix" (6:27). A bonus remix on the CD is also included (6:09).

== Remixes ==
UK 1987 7" Vinyl 888 484-7

1. "Twilight World"
  As featured on the Japanese CD Album "Another Non-Stop Sister".
2. "Another Lost Weekend"
  An extended version was featured on the 12" Remix single.

US 12" Promo Single

1. "Twilight World" (Vocal Dub)
2. "Twilight World" (Classical Dub)
3. "Twilight World" (Instrumental Dub)
4. "Twilight World" (Beat Your Sister Dub)
  As featured on the "Special Club Mixes"

Other Versions

1. "Twilight World" (Edited Version)
  As featured on the Japanese CD Album "Another Non-Stop Sister" & the 7" Single
2. "Twilight World" (Superb, Superb Mix)
  Taken from the album "It's Better To Travel", featured on the Japanese CD Album "Swing 3" & the "UK 12" Single".
3. "Twilight World" (Outer Limits Mix) AKA (Remix) AKA (Gas Distress Mix)
  Taken from the CD release of "It's Better To Travel", featured on the VERY 'Limited Edition' Japanese CD "Remixes and Others" from the "Splendid Collection" & the "UK 12" REMIX Single".
4. "Twilight World" (The World Travel Mix) AKA (12″ Remix)
  Featured on the US 4-track Vinyl 12" Single and from the Japan 4-track Vinyl 12" Single.
5. "Twilight World" (Instrumental)
  Taken from the US 4-track Vinyl 12" Single.

== Personnel ==
Swing Out Sister

- Andy Connell - Keyboards
- Corinne Drewery - Vocals
- Martin Jackson - Drums

Additional Personnel

- John Stoddart - Photography

== Charts ==
Chart (1987–1988)	Peak position
Italy Airplay (Music & Media)	4
UK Singles (The Official Charts Company)	32
US Billboard Hot 100	31
US Billboard Adult Contemporary	7
US Billboard Hot Dance 50-Club Play	9
