= Beautiful Mess (Swing Out Sister album) =

Studio album by Swing Out Sister
- Released: February 2008 (Japan); April 2008 (Philippines); August 2008 (U.K.); May 2009 (U.S.)
- Studios: Aurora Studios (London, UK)
- Length: 50:47
- Labels: Avex Trax (Japan); Shanachie (U.S.); Universal (Philippines)
- Producer: Andy Connell

Swing Out Sister chronology
Live in Tokyo (2005)	Beautiful Mess (2008)	Almost Persuaded (2017)

Beautiful Mess is the ninth studio album by the British pop group Swing Out Sister, originally released in 2008. It was produced by group member Andy Connell, who has been with Swing Out Sister since its inception.

== Release ==
The album was initially released in Japan in February 2008 on Avex Trax, then issued in the United Kingdom later in the year. Beautiful Mess was released in the United States in May 2009, distributed by the Shanachie Records label. The album reached number five on the US Billboard Top Contemporary Jazz Albums chart.

== Musicians ==
Since the group's second album, Kaleidoscope World, Swing Out Sister has consisted primarily of Andy Connell and Corinne Drewery. Both reprise familiar roles on this album, with Drewery on lead and backing vocals and Connell contributing musical arrangements. In addition, Connell produced this album, his first for the group, replacing longtime producer and collaborator Paul Staveley O'Duffy. Additional musicians include Tim Cansfield on guitar, Jody Linscott on percussion and Gina Foster and the Champagnettes on backing vocals.

== Critical reception ==
Professional ratings
Review scores
Source	Rating
AllMusic	4/5 stars

Beautiful Mess has received generally favorable reviews from music critics and journalists. AllMusic gave the album four stars out of a possible five. Daryl Easlea of the BBC reviewed the album soon after its British release in September 2008 and described the music as "(s)weet, time-warped; unmistakeable; with their brand of London Embankment sunrises and cocktail party sunsets, it's so very Swing Out Sister". The reviewer continued that "Swing Out Sister could still give Adele, Duffy and all the latest crop a spin in their soft top for their money." Elysa Gardner of USA Today chose "Time Tracks You Down" as one of her ten most intriguing tracks for the week on 18 May 2009, stating that "(r)etro-soul doesn't get much smoother or sweeter than this..." Music critic Mario Tarradell of the Dallas Morning News gave the album an "A" rating, describing it as "exquisite" and stating that the group "continue to make gorgeously lush and rhythmically jazzy albums whether stateside audiences care or not."

== Track listing ==
1. "Something Every Day" (Andy Connell, Corinne Drewery, Gina Foster) – 4:28
2. "Time Tracks You Down" (Connell, Drewery) – 3:56
3. "Butterfly" (Connell, Drewery, Foster) – 4:41
4. "My State of Mind" (Connell, Drewery, Foster) – 4:27
5. "I'd Be Happy" (Connell, Drewery) – 3:43
6. "Butterfly Lullaby (Connell, Drewery) – 3:48
7. "Secret Love (You're Invisible)" (Hajime Uchiyama, Drewery) – 4:26
8. "All I Say, All I Do" (Connell, Drewery) – 4:26
9. "Out There" (Connell, Drewery) – 4:30
10. "Beautiful Mess" (Connell, Drewery) – 4:09
11. "Butterfly" (Little Wizard Mix) (Connell, Drewery, Foster) – 3:28
12. "Something Every Day" (Little Wizard Mix) (Connell, Drewery, Foster) – 4:25

== Personnel ==
Swing Out Sister

- Corinne Drewery – lead vocals
- Andy Connell – instruments, all musical arrangements

Additional musicians

- Tim Cansfield – guitars
- Myke Wilson – drums, vocals
- Jody Linscott – percussion
- Gersende Giorgio – vocals
- Gina Foster – additional vocals
- The Champagnettes – additional vocals

=== Production ===
- Andy Connell – producer, recording, mixing
- David Millward – mastering
- James Martin – photography
- Yoshiaki Kayaki – sleeve design
- Jamie Spencer – management
