= It's Better to Travel =

Studio album by Swing Out Sister
- Released: 11 May 1987
- Recorded: 1985–1986
- Genres: Sophisti-pop; electronic; electronic pop; synth-pop; jazz; soul
- Length: 63:45
- Label: Mercury
- Producer: Paul Staveley O'Duffy

Swing Out Sister chronology
It's Better to Travel (1987)	Kaleidoscope World (1989)

Singles from It's Better to Travel
- 1. "Blue Mood" Released: November 1985; 2. "Breakout" Released: 29 September 1986; 3. "Surrender" Released: January 1987; 4. "Twilight World" Released: April 1987; 5. "Fooled by a Smile" Released: July 1987

It's Better to Travel is the debut album by the British pop band Swing Out Sister, released in 1987 on Mercury Records. Upon its release, the album reached number one on the UK Albums Chart. The album includes the single "Breakout" and garnered the band two Grammy Award nominations.

== Information ==
This was Swing Out Sister's debut album and contained the hit single "Breakout", which reached number 4 on the UK Singles Chart in November 1986 and number 6 on the US pop chart in November 1987. Subsequent singles released from It's Better to Travel include "Surrender", "Twilight World" and "Fooled by a Smile". Their debut single "Blue Mood" was remixed for the albums release. The original vinyl and cassette release comprised the first nine tracks shown below. The remaining tracks were added to the subsequent CD release.

The album also garnered the band two American Grammy Award nominations for Best New Artist and Best Pop Vocal Performance by a Group or Duo ("Breakout") at the ceremony held in 1988.

For this album, Swing Out Sister consisted of vocalist Corinne Drewery, keyboardist Andy Connell and drummer Martin Jackson. Jackson would depart the group during the recording of their second album, Kaleidoscope World.

The title for the album was derived from a quote by the Scottish author Robert Louis Stevenson: "To travel hopefully is a better thing than to arrive, and the true success is to labour."

A four track video EP "And Why Not" was also released in 1987.

On 16 July 2012, It's Better to Travel was re-released in an expanded 2-disc version, to celebrate the 25th anniversary of its release. It contained both the remastered version of the original album, plus a bonus disc of various remixes and B-sides, most of which were previously unavailable on CD.

== Reviews ==
Professional ratings
Review scores
Source	Rating
AllMusic	4.5/5 stars
Smash Hits	8/10

Caroline Sullivan of Melody Maker described the songs on It's Better to Travel as "spanking, sparkling, radio-friendly little tunes, dressed up in some Dagworthy/Galliano fashionwear and committed to vinyl by a good-looking girl and two male partners." Lucy O'Brien of New Musical Express mentioned a "lush, laidback funky mix with nifty horn section" and stated that "it should be less a case of Swing than Break Out Sister."

== Track listing ==
All tracks credited to "Swing Out Sister"

LP and cassette version

1. "Breakout" – 3:46
2. "Twilight World" (Superb, Superb, Mix) – 6:27
3. "After Hours" – 4:48
4. "Blue Mood" – 4:18
5. "Surrender" – 3:53
6. "Fooled by a Smile" – 4:06
7. "Communion" – 4:40
8. "It's Not Enough" – 3:46
9. "Theme (From 'It's Better to Travel')" – 4:32

CD version

1. "Breakout" – 3:46
2. "Twilight World" (Superb, Superb, Mix) – 6:27
3. "After Hours" – 4:48
4. "Blue Mood" – 4:18
5. "Surrender" – 3:53
6. "Fooled by a Smile" – 4:06
7. "Communion" – 4:40
8. "It's Not Enough" – 3:46
9. "Theme (From 'It's Better to Travel')" – 4:32
10. "Breakout" (NAD Mix) – 5:50
11. "Surrender" (Stuff Gun Mix) – 6:40
12. "Twilight World" (Remix) – 6:09
13. "Communion" (Instrumental) – 4:39

Note: The version of "Breakout" listed as the "NAD Mix" is actually "A New Rockin' Version". This was corrected in the 2012 re-issue.

=== Remastered 2-CD Version ===
CD1

1. "Breakout" – 3:46
2. "Twilight World" (Superb, Superb Mix) – 6:27
3. "After Hours" – 4:48
4. "Blue Mood" – 4:18
5. "Surrender" – 5:53
6. "Fooled by a Smile" – 4:06
7. "Communion" – 4:40
8. "It’s Not Enough" – 3:46
9. "Theme (From 'It’s Better to Travel')" – 4:32
10. "Breakout" (N.A.D. Mix) – 7:02
11. "Surrender" (Stuff Gun Mix) – 6:40
12. "Twilight World" (Gas Distress Mix) – 6:13

CD2

1. "Breakout" (A New Rockin' Version) – 5:52
2. "Surrender" (Roadrunner Mix) – 6:17
3. "Fooled by a Smile" (Ralph Mix) – 6:10
4. "Blue Mood" (Dubbed Up Mix) – 6:48
5. "Communion" (Instrumental) – 4:43
6. "Dirty Money" – 4:09
7. "Fever" – 4:33
8. "Who’s to Blame?" – 5:13
9. "Wake Me When It’s Over" – 4:34
10. "Another Lost Weekend" – 5:27
11. "Blue Mood" (Growler Mix) – 6:52
12. "Breakout" (Horny Mix) – 4:33

== Charts ==
=== Weekly charts ===
Chart (1987)	Peak position
Australia (Kent Music Report)	23
Canada Top Albums/CDs (RPM)	29
UK Albums (Official Charts Company)	1
US Billboard 200	40

=== Year-end charts ===
Chart (1987)	Position
UK Albums (OCC)	40
