= Am I the Same Girl =

1969 single by Barbara Acklin

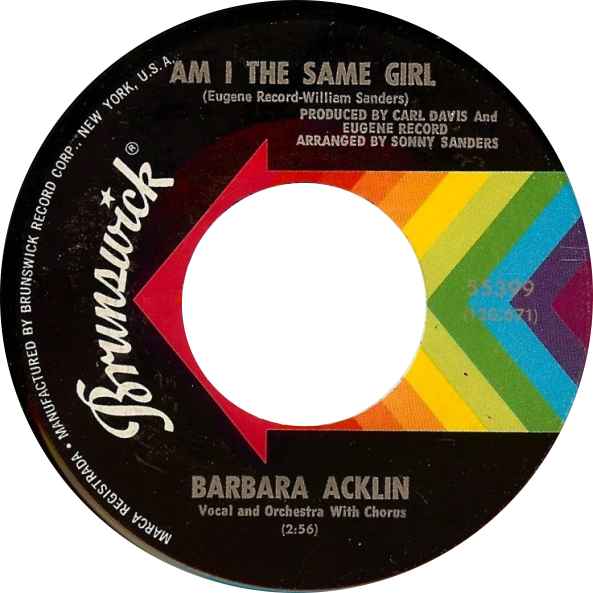
- US single of Barbara Acklin recording

Single by Barbara Acklin

from the album Seven Days of Night
- B-side: "Be By My Side"
- Released: February 1969
- Length: 2:56
- Label: Brunswick
- Songwriters: Eugene Record; Sonny Sanders
- Producer: Carl Davis

Barbara Acklin singles chronology
"From the Teacher to the Preacher" (1968)	"Am I the Same Girl" (1969)	"After You" (1969)

"Soulful Strut"
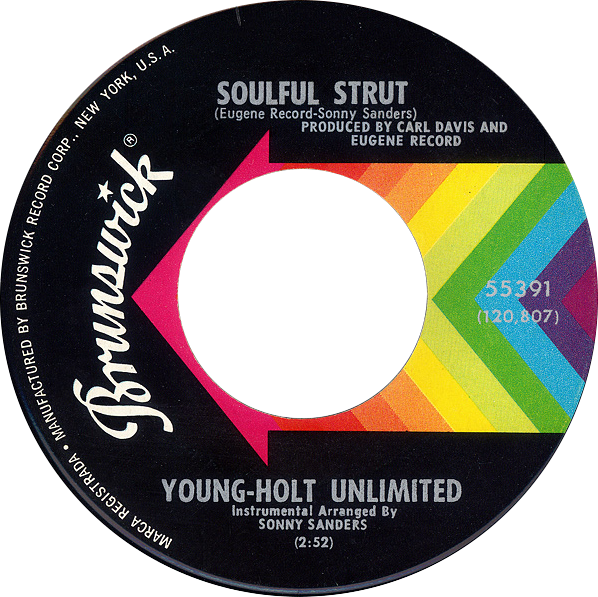
- US single of Young-Holt Unlimited recording

Single by Young-Holt Unlimited

from the album Soulful Strut
- B-side: "Country Slicker Joe"
- Released: November 1968
- Recorded: 1968
- Genre: Soul, instrumental
- Length: 2:52
- Label: Brunswick
- Songwriters: Eugene Record, Sonny Sanders
- Producer: Carl Davis

Young-Holt Unlimited singles chronology
"Soul Sister" (1968)	"Soulful Strut" (1968)	"Who's Making Love" (1969)

"Am I the Same Girl" is a popular song written by Eugene Record and Sonny Sanders. First released in 1968 by American soul singer and songwriter Barbara Acklin, "Am I the Same Girl" charted most successfully in the US as a 1992 release by British pop band Swing Out Sister, where it went to number 1 in the adult contemporary charts and reached the greatest number of fans. However, the song had its greatest impact as a 1968–69 instrumental hit single by Young-Holt Unlimited under the title "Soulful Strut".

== Background ==
Although Barbara Acklin recorded the song first, producer Carl Davis removed her voice from the track, replaced it with a piano solo by Floyd Morris, and released the resultant track in November 1968 as "Soulful Strut" credited to Young-Holt Unlimited; it became a No. 3 hit in the United States and went to No. 1 in Canada. It became a gold record. Neither Eldee Young nor Red Holt is believed to have played on the track, which was the work of session musicians identified only as the Brunswick Studio Band. Acklin's version was released in February 1969 and reached No. 33 on the R&B chart, crossing over and peaking at No. 79 on the pop listing.

== Charts ==
Weekly charts for "Soulful Strut" by Young-Holt Unlimited
Chart (1969)	Peak position
Canada Top Singles (RPM)	1
US Billboard Hot 100	3
US Easy Listening (Billboard)	2
US Rhythm & Blues Singles (Billboard)	3

Weekly charts for "Am I the Same Girl" by Barbara Acklin
Chart (1969)	Peak position
Canada Top Singles (RPM)	52
US Billboard Hot 100	79
US Rhythm & Blues Singles (Billboard)	33

== Dusty Springfield version ==
"Am I the Same Girl"

Single by Dusty Springfield
- B-side: "Earthbound Gypsy"
- Released: September 12, 1969
- Recorded: August 1969
- Length: 2:58
- Label: Philips
- Songwriters: Eugene Record; Sonny Sanders
- Producer: Bill Landis

Dusty Springfield UK singles chronology
"Son of a Preacher Man" (1968)	"Am I the Same Girl" (1969)	"Brand New Me" (1969)

British singer Dusty Springfield, on the recommendation of Douggie Reece, the bassist in her touring band the Echoes, recorded "Am I the Same Girl" at Philips Studios Marble Arch in August 1969; Bill Landis produced the session, which was arranged by Keith Mansfield. The track marked Springfield's last UK chart appearance of the 1960s, though it was not a major hit, stalling at No. 43. "Am I the Same Girl" also gave Springfield a minor hit in Australia (No. 75).

Chart (1969)	Peak position
Australia	75
UK Singles (Official Charts)	43

== Swing Out Sister version ==
"Am I the Same Girl"

Single by Swing Out Sister

from the album Get in Touch with Yourself
- B-side: "Breakout" (N.A.D. mix); "I Can Hear You but I Can't See You"; "Spirit Moves"
- Released: March 30, 1992
- Genre: Synth-pop
- Length: 4:07
- Label: Fontana
- Songwriters: Eugene Record; Sonny Sanders
- Producer: Paul Staveley O'Duffy

Swing Out Sister singles chronology
"You on My Mind" (1990)	"Am I the Same Girl" (1992)	"Notgonnachange" (1992)

Audio
- "Am I the Same Girl" on YouTube

The vocal version of "Am I the Same Girl" had its most successful incarnation via a 1992 remake by British pop group Swing Out Sister, recorded for their third album, Get in Touch with Yourself (1992). The group's vocalist Corinne Drewery has acknowledged Dusty Springfield as a major influence; however, it was a chance hearing of the original Barbara Acklin version at a Manchester disco specializing in Northern soul that convinced Drewery and her Swing Out Sister partner Andy Connell to remake "Am I the Same Girl".

Released in March 1992 by Fontana Records as the lead single from the album, "Am I the Same Girl" gave Swing Out Sister their highest-charting UK single since 1987, peaking at No. 21. The track had more impact outside the UK, peaking at No. 5 in Canada, No. 15 in the Netherlands, and No. 18 in Belgium. "Am I the Same Girl" also charted in the United States, reaching No. 45 on the Billboard Hot 100 and No. 1 on the Billboard Adult Contemporary chart.

Having recorded two distinct live renditions of "Am I the Same Girl" which appear on, respectively, Live at the Jazz Café (1993) and Live in Tokyo (2005), Swing Out Sister recorded a new studio version of the song for their 2012 album Private View.

=== Charts ===
==== Weekly charts ====
Chart (1992)	Peak position
Australia (ARIA)	123
Belgium (Ultratop 50 Flanders)	18
Canada Top Singles (RPM)	5
Europe (European Dance Radio)	1
Germany (GfK)	53
Netherlands (Single Top 100)	15
UK Singles (Official Charts)	21
UK Airplay (Music Week)	3
US Billboard Hot 100	45
US Adult Contemporary (Billboard)	1
US Top 40/Mainstream (Billboard)	26
US Cash Box Top 100	32

==== Year-end charts ====
Chart (1992)	Position
Brazil (Crowley)	70
Europe (European Dance Radio)	24
UK Airplay (Music Week)	44
US Adult Contemporary (Billboard)	31

=== Release history ===
Region	Date	Format(s)	Label(s)	Ref.
United Kingdom	March 30, 1992	7-inch vinyl; 12-inch vinyl; CD; cassette	Fontana	
Japan	April 25, 1992	Mini-CD	Fontana	
Australia	June 29, 1992	CD; cassette	Fontana	

== Other versions ==
In 1969, Bill Deal and the Rhondels included a version of "Soulful Strut" on their Vintage Rock LP (on Heritage Records, HTS-35,003).

Brazilian organist Walter Wanderley recorded a Bossa Nova driven cover of "Soulful Strut" on his 1969 album, Moondreams.

German pianist Horst Jankowski recorded "Soulful Strut" as the opening track of his 1969 album, A Walk in the Evergreens.

In 1970, Salena Jones recorded "Am I the Same Girl" for her album Everybody's Talkin' About Salena Jones.

In 1979 George Benson recorded a cover of "Soulful Strut" on his album Livin' Inside Your Love.

In 1996 Grover Washington Jr. covered the song for his album of the same name. It was also later released as a remix under the title The Top Down version.

In 1996 Paul Jackson, Jr. recorded a cover of "Soulful Strut" on his album Never Alone: Duets.

In 1999, saxophonist Kim Waters recorded "Am I the Same Girl (Soulful Strut)" for his One Special Moment album; featuring vocalist Meli'sa Morgan and Chuck Loeb, the track was a non-charting single release in February 2000.

In 2004, Joss Stone used the Young-Holt version as a starting point for her song "Don't Cha Wanna Ride", and credited the composers of "Am I the Same Girl" as co-composers of her song.

In September 2005, Martha Stewart began to use the Swing Out Sister version in her promo commercials for her show Martha on NBC television in America and then as the opening introduction theme song of the show. Each show starts with the song playing over a montage of images and photos of Martha Stewart growing up.

Dionne Bromfield covered the song on her debut album Introducing Dionne Bromfield (2009).
