= Filth and Dreams =

Studio album by Swing Out Sister
- Released: 17 March 1999
- Recorded: July 1997 – May 1998
- Label: Mercury
- Producer: Paul Staveley O'Duffy

Swing Out Sister chronology
Shapes and Patterns (1997)	Filth and Dreams (1999)	Somewhere Deep in the Night (2001)

Professional ratings
Review scores
Source	Rating
AllMusic	4.5/5 stars

Filth and Dreams is the sixth studio album by British pop group Swing Out Sister. It was released in Japan in March 1999 and was unreleased elsewhere until 2012, when the band produced a limited repressing sold at their concerts and via PledgeMusic. It ultimately saw a wide release in 2025 in the box set Certain Shades of Limelight, released by Cherry Pop Records.

== Track listing ==
All tracks written by Andy Connell, Corinne Drewery and Paul Staveley O'Duffy.

1. "Who's Been Sleeping" – 4:36
2. "Closer Than the Sun" – 3:42
3. "Sugar Free" – 4:29
4. "Filth and Dreams" – 3:54
5. "Happy When You're High" – 5:34
6. "If I Had the Heart" – 4:21
7. "When Morning Comes" – 4:27
8. "Invisible" – 4:26
9. "World Out of Control" – 3:59
10. "Make You Stay" – 3:57

== Personnel ==
Swing Out Sister

- Corinne Drewery – lead vocals, backing vocals, drum programming (3)
- Andy Connell – keyboards, synthesizers, Hammond C3 organ, acoustic guitars, Fender jazz bass, Paiste hi-hats, backing vocals

Additional Musicians

- Paul Staveley O'Duffy – programming, sequencing, backing vocals
- Tim Cansfield – electric guitars (5, 7), backing vocals

=== Production ===
- Paul Staveley O'Duffy – producer, engineer, mixing
- Jason Clift – engineer
- Ben Darlow – engineer
- Ben Ashbourn – assistant engineer
- Greg Fleming – assistant engineer
- Martin Jenkins – assistant engineer
- Savas Iossifidis – assistant engineer
- Olly Meacock – assistant engineer
- Andy Ward – assistant engineer
- James Martin – photography
- Yoshinori Kishi – sleeve design
