= Where in the World (song) =

Single by Swing Out Sister

from the album Kaleidoscope World
- B-side: "Taxi Town"; "The Windmills of Your Mind"
- Released: 1989
- Recorded: 1988–1989
- Genre: Pop
- Length: 5:33
- Label: Fontana
- Songwriters: Corinne Drewery; Andrew Connell

Swing Out Sister singles chronology
"You on My Mind" (1989)	"Where in the World" (1989)	"Waiting Game" (1989)

"Where in the World" is a single by British band Swing Out Sister. It was the second single from the group's second studio album, Kaleidoscope World and was slightly edited for release. The song "The Windmills of Your Mind" was recorded live for The Jeff Graham Show, courtesy of Radio Luxembourg.

== Track listings ==
UK CD single

1. "Where in the World"
2. "Taxi Town"
3. "Windmills of Your Mind"
4. "Breakout" (A New Rockin' Version)

UK 7" single

1. "Where in the World"
2. "Taxi Town"

UK 10" single

1. "Where in the World" (Bongo Fury Mix)
2. "Where in the World"
3. "Windmills of Your Mind"

UK 12" single

1. "Where in the World" (Radical Mix)
2. "Where in the World"
3. "Taxi Town"
4. "Windmills of Your Mind"

== Charts ==
=== Weekly charts ===
Chart (1989)	Peak position
Australia (ARIA)	168
Italy Airplay (Music & Media)	2
UK Singles (OCC)	47
