= Notgonnachange =

1992 single by Swing Out Sister

Single by Swing Out Sister

from the album Get in Touch with Yourself
- A-side: "Notgonnachange"
- B-side: "Alone"
- Released: 1992
- Genre: Synth-pop
- Length: 4:17
- Label: Fontana
- Songwriters: Andy Connell; Corinne Drewery
- Producer: Paul Staveley O'Duffy

Swing Out Sister singles chronology
| "Am I the Same Girl" (1992) | "Notgonnachange" (1992) | "La-La (Means I Love You)" (1994) |

"Notgonnachange" is a song by British pop group Swing Out Sister. It was released in 1992 by Fontana Records as the follow-up single to "Am I the Same Girl". It reached number 49 on the UK Singles Chart and number 22 on the US Billboard Hot Adult Contemporary Tracks chart. The song was subsequently remixed by Frankie Knuckles, and the dance mix peaked at number 21 on the Billboard Hot Dance Club Play chart during the summer of 1992.

In line with the album theme, Corinne Drewery also grew out her hair from her trademark bob which had become a visual signature for their early years.

== Remixes ==
- Notgonnachange (CD Mini) PHDR-111
1. "Notgonnachange" (Album Version) - (4:55) (Taken from the album "Get in Touch with Yourself")
2. "Am I The Same Girl" (Bubba's Version) - (4:09)
- Notgonnachange (CD Maxi) SWICD 10
1. "Notgonnachange" (O' Duffy 7" Mix) - (4:19) (Available on the album "Best of Swing Out Sister")
2. "Notgonnachange" (Dashi 1 Mix) - (8:10)
3. "Alone" - (11:55)
- Notgonnachange (CD Maxi) 866 855-2
1. "Notgonnachange" (Album Version) - (4:55) (Taken from the album "Get in Touch with Yourself")
2. "Notgonnachange" (Classic Song Mix) - (5:35)
3. "Notgonnachange" (O' Duffy 7" Mix) - (4:19)
4. "Notgonnachange" (New Jack Swing Mix) - (5:08)
5. "Notgonnachange" (O' Duffy 12" Mix) - (8:09)
- Notgonnachange (The Frankie Knuckles Remixes) 864 049-1, SWING 1012 Vinyl 12"
1. "Notgonnachange" (Classic Club Mix) - (7:23)
2. "Notgonnachange" (Classic Song Mix) - (5:35)
3. "Notgonnachange" (Mix Of Drama) - (6:45)
4. "Notgonnachange" (Dashi 1 Mix) - (8:10)

== Charts ==
| Chart (1992) | Peak position |
|---|---|
| UK Singles (OCC) | 49 |
| UK Airplay (Music Week) | 27 |
| UK Dance (Music Week) | 29 |
| UK Club Chart (Music Week) | 34 |
| US Hot Adult Contemporary Tracks (Billboard) | 22 |
| US Hot Dance Club Play (Billboard) | 21 |
