= The Living Return =

Studio album by Swing Out Sister
- Released: 10 August 1994
- Studios: Opaz Studios, Strongroom and Metropolis Studios (London, UK)
- Genres: Jazz; soul
- Length: 72:33
- Label: Mercury
- Producers: Ray Hayden; Swing Out Sister

Swing Out Sister chronology
Get in Touch with Yourself (1992)	The Living Return (1994)	Best of Swing Out Sister (1996)

The Living Return is the fourth studio album by the British pop group Swing Out Sister. It was released in August 1994 on Mercury Records.

== Charts ==
Although this was the first studio album by the group that failed to reach the UK Albums Chart, the lead single, "La-La (Means I Love You)", peaked at #37 on the UK Singles Chart. This song is a cover version of the 1968 hit by The Delfonics and appeared on the soundtrack of the film Four Weddings and a Funeral. "Better Make It Better" was also released as a single, although it did not make the music charts in either the UK or the US. The song "Mama Didn't Raise No Fool" was featured on the American basic cable and satellite television network, Disney Channel.

== Reviews ==
New Musical Express magazine gave The Living Return an 8 out of 10 rating in its 17 September 1994 issue, saying that the album "...sounds divine, a glissando of strings and things, an aural bath for the ears." Q magazine also spoke favourably of the album, mentioning that "SOS have an ear for a snappy arrangements and a mature lightness of touch as they gently echo Miles Davis, Weather Report and the whole modish Afro era." It rated the album with four stars and an "excellent" rating.

== Track listing ==
All tracks composed by Andy Connell and Corinne Drewery; except where indicated CD and cassette version

1. "Better Make It Better" – 6:53
2. "Don't Let Yourself Down" – 4:42
3. "Ordinary People" – 6:22
4. "Mama Didn't Raise No Fool" – 5:11
5. "Don't Give Up On A Good Thing" (Connell, Drewery, Derick Johnson, Tim Cansfield) – 3:44
6. "Making the Right Move" – 10:32
7. "La-La (Means I Love You)" (Thom Bell, W. Hart) – 4:52
8. "Feel Free" – 5:06
9. "Stop and Think It Over" – 6:03
10. "That's the Way It Goes" (Connell, Drewery, Johnson, Cansfield) – 4:42
11. "All in Your Mind" – 4:15
12. "O Pesadelo Dos Autores" (Connell, Drewery, Maurice White, Airto Moreira, Regina Werneck, Tania Maria Correa Reis, Stevie Wonder, Sylvia Moy, Henry Cosby, Ivan Lins, Victor Martins, Aloysio de Oliveira, Herbie Hancock, Bennie Maupin, Burick) – 5:26
13. "Low Down Dirty Business" (Connell, Drewery, Johnson, Cansfield) – 5:19
- The song "O Pesadelo Dos Autores" features a medley of the songs:
1. "Brazilian Rhyme" (Maurice White) – Earth, Wind & Fire
  From the 1977 album "All 'N All"
2. "Celebration Suite" (Airto Moreira) – Return to Forever
  From the 1975 album "No Mystery"
3. "Come with Me" (Regina Werneck, Tania Maria Correa Reis) – Tania Maria
  From the 1982 album "Come with Me"
4. "My Cherie Amour" (Stevie Wonder, Sylvia Moy, Henry Cosby) – Stevie Wonder
  From the 1969 album "My Cherie Amour"
5. "The Smiling Hour" (Ivan Lins, Victor Martins, Aloysio de Oliveira) – Kalima
  From the 1984 single "The Smiling Hour/Flyaway"
6. "Butterfly" (Herbie Hancock, Bennie Maupin) – Herbie Hancock
  From the 1974 album "Thrust"

A limited edition "edits" version was also available featuring edited versions of six tracks from the album.

== Personnel ==
Swing Out Sister

- Corinne Drewery – lead vocals, arrangements
- Andy Connell – keyboards, arrangements

Additional Musicians

- Danny Gluckstein – programming
- Tim Cansfield – guitars (1–6, 8–13)
- Matt Backer – guitars (7)
- Derrick Johnson – bass guitar
- Myke Wilson – drums, timbales solo (12)
- Chris Manis – percussion
- Gary Plumley – saxophones, flute
- Richard Edwards – trombone
- John Thirkell – trumpet, flugelhorn
- Derek Green – backing vocals
- Erica Harrold – backing vocals
- Sylvia Mason-James – backing vocals

=== Production ===
- Ray Hayden – producer (1–6, 8–13)
- Swing Out Sister – co-producers (1–6, 8–13), producers (7)
- Mark McGuire – mix engineer, recording (7), mixing (7)
- Jamie Cullam – assistant mix engineer
- Luke Gifford – assistant mix engineer
- James Martin – photography
- Via Johnson – design
- Bennett Freed – management (USA)
- Stephen King – management
