= Beautiful Mess =

Beautiful Mess may refer to:

- "Beautiful Mess" (Diamond Rio song), by Diamond Rio
- "Beautiful Mess" (Kristian Kostov song), Bulgarian entry in the Eurovision Song Contest 2017
- "Beautiful Mess", a song by Miranda Cosgrove from her 2010 album Sparks Fly
- "Beautiful Mess", a song by Gabi DeMartino from her 2022 album Paintings of Me
- Beautiful Mess (Jeff Scott Soto album)
- Beautiful Mess (Swing Out Sister album)
- Beautiful Mess (Thelonious Monster album)
