= The Waiting Game =

The Waiting Game may refer to:

== Film and television ==
- The Waiting Game, a 1998 film starring Chris Potter
- The Waiting Game (film), a 1999 American comedy film
- The Waiting Game (game show), a 2001–2002 British game show
- "The Waiting Game" (The Loud House), a 2016 TV episode
- "The Waiting Game" (The Middle), a 2015 TV episode
- "The Waiting Game" (The Paynes), a 2018 TV episode

== Music ==
=== Albums ===
- The Waiting Game (Tina Brooks album) or the title track, 1961
- The Waiting Game (Una Healy album) or the title song, 2017
- Waiting Game (album), by Zoot Sims and Orchestra, 1966

=== Songs ===
- "Waiting Game" (Banks song), 2013
- "Waiting Game" (The Cooper Temple Clause song), 2007
- "Waiting Game" (Swing Out Sister song), 1989
- "The Waiting Game", by the Expression, 1985
- "The Waiting Game", by Squeeze from Babylon and On, 1987
- "Waiting Game", by Isac Elliot, 2019
- "Waiting Game", by Parson James, 2016
