= Waiting Game (Swing Out Sister song) =

1989 single by Swing Out Sister

Single by Swing Out Sister

from the album Kaleidoscope World
- Released: 1989
- Genre: Synth-pop
- Length: 4:13
- Label: Fontana
- Songwriters: Andy Connell; Corinne Drewery
- Producers: Andy Connell; Corinne Drewery; Paul Staveley O'Duffy

Swing Out Sister singles chronology
"Where in the World" (1989)	"Waiting Game" (1989)	"Forever Blue" (1989)

"Waiting Game" is a song by the British pop band Swing Out Sister. It was released in 1989, via Fontana Records as the third single but was not released in the UK. The song was the sixth track from their second studio album, Kaleidoscope World (1989). It is a pop song that was written and produced by Andy Connell and Corinne Drewery.

== Track listing ==
US CD single
No.	Title	Length
1.	"Waiting Game"	4:13
2.	"Waiting Game" (remix edit)	3:59

== Charts ==
=== Weekly charts ===
Chart (1989)	Peak position
Canada Top Singles (RPM)	45
Italy Airplay (Music & Media)	13
US Billboard Hot 100	86
US Adult Contemporary (Billboard)	6
US Dance Club Songs (Billboard)	33
