= Nigel Hitchcock =

English jazz saxophonist

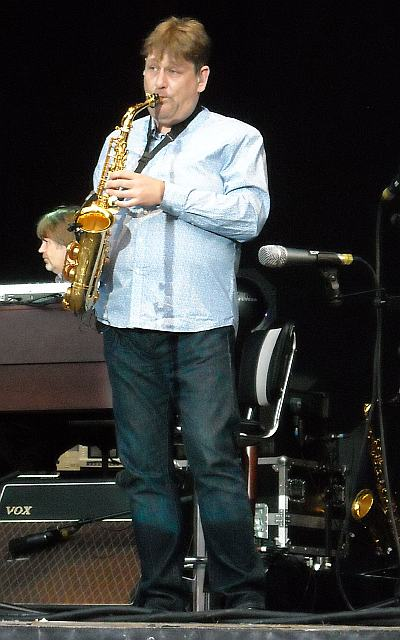
- On stage with Mark Knopfler in Dresden, Germany, 4 July 2013

Background information
- Born: 4 January 1971 (age 55); Rustington, England
- Genres: Jazz, pop
- Occupation: Musician
- Instrument: Saxophone
- Years active: 1982–present
- Website: www.nigelhitchcock.com

Nigel Hitchcock (born 4 January 1971) is an English jazz saxophonist.

== Biography ==
Hitchcock began to play alto sax at the age of eight. In 1982 he and his elder brother Clive joined the National Youth Jazz Orchestra. After one year Nigel took the lead alto chair for the next five years. During this time the orchestra toured with different musicians such as Vic Damone, Buddy Greco and Al Martino.

At the age of 16, Hitchcock moved to London and began his career as a session musician and also had recorded TV jingles, movie soundtracks, and pop solos.

In 1989 he joined the contemporary saxophone quartet Itchy Fingers. The band toured Europe and South-East Asia for 18 months. With Itchy Fingers Hitchcock received three jazz awards: the Schlitz award for rising star, the Cleo Laine Personal Award for best young musician, and the Pat Smythe (pianist) Trust award. He left the band to continue as a pop and session musician.

Nigel has performed with many artists including Tom Jones, Wet Wet Wet, Beverley Craven, Hue and Cry, Swing Out Sister, Ray Charles, Robbie Williams, and Mark Knopfler and has released 3 solo albums, the first 'Snakeranch Sessions' in 1997 under Black Box and the next two,'SmootHitch'(2013) and 'Hitchgnosis'(2019)released under his own Eight Inch Clock label.

== Discography ==
=== Pop ===
- Robbie Williams/ Christmas Party – Columbia 2019
- Q4/ Uphill Struggle – Hey!jazz HJZ-18070 2019
- Nigel Hitchcock/ Hitchgnosis – Eight Inch Clock 2019
- MaxSax/ Shift – Jazzhaus 2019
- Incognito/ Tomorrow's New Dream – Bluey Music 2019
- Saxofourte/ Rubini Is Coming – 36 Music 2019
- Mark Knopfler/ Down The Road Wherever – British Grove Records 2018
- Kate Bush/ Remastered Part 1 – Parlophone 2018
- Aretha Franklin with RPO/ A Brand New Me – Rhino Records, Atlantic 2017
- Elvis with RPO/ The Wonder of You – Sony Music/RCA/Legacy 2016
- MaxSax/ The Long Ride – Painted Dog Records 2016
- Tristan/ Full Power – Isolde Records – 888174601410 2015
- Gavin Harrison/ Cheating the Polygraph – KSCOPE 2014
- Mark Knopfler/ Tracker – British Grove Records 2015
- Incognito/ Amplified Soul – Ear Music – 0209437ERE 2014
- Marilia Andrés / Subir una montaña- 2013
- Nigel Hitchcock/ SmootHitch (Eight Inch Clock)2012
- Mark Knopfler/ Privateering/Universal 2012
- Karl Jenkins/ The Peacemakers/EMI 2012
- Mario Biondi/ Due/Handful of Music 2012
- The Deep MO/ Funk in the 3rd Quarter/Groove4Dayz 2012
- Usonic/ Diversion/Groove4Dayz 2012
- Ryujin Kiyoshi/ People/EMI Music Japan 2001
- Usonic/ EvolutionGroove4Dayz 2011
- Peatbog Faeries/ Dust/Peatbog Records 2011
- Sebastiaan Cornellison/ On Impulse/On Impulse 2011
- Old Blind Dogs/ Wherever Yet May Be 2010
- Marti Pellow/ Boulevard of Life 2010
- Claire Martin/ A Modern Art/LINN AKD 340 2009
- Mark Nightingale/ Out of the Box/Woodville Records 2009
- Peatbog Faeries/ Live/Peatbog Records 2009
- The Deep MO/ The Deep MO/Groove4Dayz 2009
- 12 Stone Toddler/ Does It Scare You/Amazon 2007
- Claire Martin/ He Never Mentioned Love/Linn Records AKD 295 2007
- Peatbog Faeries/ What Men Deserve To Lose/Peatbog Records 2007
- Tony Christie/ Way To Amarillo/Tug Records 2006
- Lisa Stansfield/ The Moment/Edelr 2005
- Peatbog Faeries/ Croftwork/Peatbog Records 2005
- Ian Shaw/ Drawn To All Things/Linn AKD276 2005
- Chris Botti/ When I Fall in Love/Columbia Records 2004
- Karl Jenkins/ Adiemus V, Vocalise/EMI 557 6492 2004
- Colin Towns/ Nowhere And Heaven/Provocateur Records 2004
- Dani Siciliano/ Likes/!K7 2004
- Shirley Bassey/ Thank You for the Years/Sony 2004
- Claire Martin/ Secret Love/Linn Records AKD 391 2004
- Snowdogs/ Deep Cuts, Fast Remedies/Victory Records 2002
- Claire Martin/ Too Darn Hot!/Linn Records AKH 272 2002
- Gota Yashiki/ Day and Night/Instinct Records 2001
- Sheena Easton/ Fabulous/Universal 2001
- Clark Tracey/ Stability/Linn Records AKD159 2001
- Swing Out Sister/ Somewhere Deep in the Night – Universal UICE-1010/ 2001
- Jamiroquai/ A Funk Odyssey – Sony 5040692 2001
- Joe Cocker / No Ordinary World – EMI – 1999
- Gary Barlow / 12 Months 11 Days – BMG – 1999
- Richard Ashcroft / "Money To Burn"/BMG – 1999
- Boyzone / Shooting Star – Polydor 5691672 1998
- Kym Mazelle / Young Hearts Run Free – EMI CDEM 488 – 1998
- Lutricia McNeal / "Someone Loves You Honey" – Wildstar CDWild9 – 1998
- Spice Girls / Lady is a Vamp – 1998
- Spice Girls+Echo & the Bunnymen / England Forever – London LONCD 414 – 1998
- Robbie Williams / "Let Me Entertain You" – Chrysalis CDCHS 5080 – 1998
- Brand New Heavies / Close to You – 1997
- Shane Richie / The Album – Polygram TV 539 495-2 – 1997
- Shakatak / Let The Piano Play – CD INZ 5 – 1997
- Ray Charles / Strong Love Affair – Qwest 9362-46107-2 – 1996
- Hue and Cry / Jazznotjazz – Linn akd057 – 1996
- Kavana / Crazy Chance – Virgin 7243 89351828 – 1996
- Adiemus / Songs of the sanctuary – Virgin vjcp-25180 – 1995
- Alejandro Sanz / 3 – wea 0630 10122-2 – 1995
- Boo Radleys / "Wake Up Boo!" – Creation CRECD179 – 1995
- Cher / It's a mans world – wea 0630-12670-2 – 1995
- Linda Lewis / For Love Sake – Turpin tpn-1CD – 1995
- Take That / Nobody Else – RCA 74321 279092 – 1995
- Teenage Fanclub / Grand Prix – Creation CRECD173 – 1995
- Carleen Anderson / Nervous Breakdown – Circa 7243 8 9229127 – 1994
- Tom Jones / The Lead and How to Swing It – Interscope 6544926492 – 1994
- Rick Astley / Body & Soul – BMG 74321156332 – 1993
- Kate Bush / The Red Shoes – EMI 7243 8 27277 2 9 – 1993
- Right Said Fred / Sex and Travel – Tug SnogCD2 – 1993
- Kenny Thomas / Wait for me – Cooltempo 7243 8 27209 2 8 – 1993
- The Wonder Stuff / Construction for the Modern Idiot – Polydor 519894-2 – 1993
- The Beloved / Conscience – East-West 4509-91483-2 – 1992
- Magic Garden / Another Way – Blue Triangle 01 – 1992
- Jimmy Nail / Growing Up in Public – East-West 4509-90144-2 – 1992
- Swing Out Sister / Get in Touch with Yourself – Fontana 512241-2 – 1992
- Father Father / We are all so very happy – Go Discs 828 258-2 – 1991
- Moody Blues / Keys of the Kingdom – Polydor 849-443-2 – 1991
- The Pasadenas / Love Thing – CBS CD PASA 4 – 1990
- The Pasadenas/Elevate / Columbia – 467023.2 – 1990
- Sugarcubes / Here Today, Tomorrow Next Week! – One Little Indian tplp15CD – 1989

=== Jazz ===
- Gordon Haskell The Lady Wants To Know – RandM Records RAMCD011 (UK) / Hypertension Records HYP 4233 (Europe) – 2004
- Clark Tracey/ Stability – Linn Records AKD159 – 2001
- Colin Towns Mask Orchestra / Another Think Coming – Provocateur PVC1028
- Richard Niles / Club Deranged – Nucool NC0001 – 1999
- Franc O'Shea / Esprit – Alltone ALFO 003 – 1999
- Kate Dimbleby / Good Vibrations – Black Box BBJ1004 – 1998
- Don Weller Big Band / Live – 33 Records 33jazz032 – 1997
- Colin Towns Mask Orchestra / Nowhere & Heaven – Provocateur PVC 1013 – 1996
- Laurence Cottle / Live! – Jazzizit JITCD9504 – 1995
- Paul Spong / Holdin' On Big – Bat BBM 9501 – 1995
- Clark Tracey / Full Speed Sideways – 33 Records 33Jazz018 – 1994
- Guy Barker's Extravaganza / Isn't It? – Spotlite SPJ-CD 545 – 1993
- Laurence Cottle / Five Seasons – WAD CD 001 – 1992
- Claire Martin / Devil May Care – Linn AKD021 – 1993
- Masque (Niki Falzon) / Twilight Moods – MASQUE 9361 – 1992
- Itchy Fingers / Live – enja 6076 2 – 1991
- Sax Appeal / Flat out – HEP CD 2050 – 1991
- Tony Crombie & Friends / Renaissance – CDREN 001 – 1989

=== Other ===
- Barbara Windsor / You've Got A Friend – Telstar TVCD3034 – 1999
- Chris Young / The Man Who Knew Too Little (soundtrack) – Varèse Sarabande 5886 – 1997
- Sax Moods / Capture the spirit – Dino DINCD106 – 1995
- Michael Ball / One Careful Owner – Columbia 477280 2 – 1994
- Mark Isham / Cool World (movie soundtrack) – Varèse Sarabande VSD-5382 – 1992
- London Symphony Orchestra / Classic Rock-Wind of Change – Columbia MoodCD19 – 1991
