= Almost Persuaded =

Almost Persuaded may refer to:

- "Almost Persuaded," a gospel song written by Philip Paul Bliss
- "Almost Persuaded" (song), a 1966 song by David Houston
- Almost Persuaded (album), a 2017 album by Swing Out Sister
