= Fooled by a Smile =

Single by Swing Out Sister

from the album It's Better to Travel
- B-side: "Fever"
- Released: 29 June 1987
- Recorded: 1986
- Genre: Northern soul
- Length: 4:05
- Label: Mercury Records
- Songwriters: Connell; Drewery; Jackson
- Producer: Paul Staveley O'Duffy

Swing Out Sister singles chronology
"Twilight World" (1987)	"Fooled by a Smile" (1987)	"You on My Mind" (1989)

"Fooled by a Smile" is a 1987 song by the British pop act Swing Out Sister. It was the final single to be taken from their debut album It's Better To Travel and reached #43 on the UK Singles Chart in July of that year.

It would be the final single that drummer Martin Jackson would appear on in the writing credits and in the music video. Consequently, Swing Out Sister became a duo after this single.

== Music video ==
The music video for this single features Corinne Drewery, Andy Connell and Jackson riding bicycles and enjoying other leisure activities around the Salton Sea area in Southern California. Visible in the video are the famous "Texaco Marine" sign and the North Shore Beach and Yacht Club.

As with "Twilight World," "Fooled by a Smile" would include segments shot in Super-8.

== Critical reception ==
Jerry Smith of British magazine Music Week described "Fooled by a Smile" a "stylish and very polished track" displaying Drewery's "smooth voice" and deemed it a potential hit.

== Remixes ==
1. "Fooled by a Smile" (7" Remix/TV Mix) (As featured on the UK - Best Of - CD Album Breakout and the 7" Single)
2. "Fooled by a Smile" (Album Version) (Taken from the Album It's Better To Travel)
3. "Fooled by a Smile" (Ralph Mix) (As featured on the Japanese CD Album Another Non-Stop Sister and the UK 12" Single)
4. "Fooled by a Smile" (Phi Phi Mix) (As featured on the Japanese CD Album Swing 3, the VERY 'Limited Edition' Japanese CD Remixes and Others from the "Splendid Collection" and the Japanese 7" Single)

== Charts ==
Chart (1987)	Peak position
Italy Airplay (Music & Media)	5
