= Almost Persuaded (album) =

Studio album by Swing Out Sister
- Released: November 2017
- Genre: Jazz
- Length: 45:37
- Label: Self-released (MP3 release); Sony Music (general release)
- Producer: Andy Connell

Swing Out Sister chronology
Beautiful Mess (2008)	Almost Persuaded (2017)

Almost Persuaded is the tenth studio album released by jazz/pop duo Swing Out Sister. It was produced by band member Andy Connell. It is the culmination of "Moveable Feast", a PledgeMusic project that had been running for several years. In 2015, the band had released Rushes, an in-progress version of the album. Almost Persuaded was released via direct MP3 download in November 2017 and then via autographed CD to those had pledged to the project in December 2017. The album was released on 22 June 2018.

A CD version of the album without vocals was available at the band's gig at Islington Assembly Hall on 13 November 2018.

== Track listing ==
All songs written by Andy Connell and Corinne Drewery except where noted

=== Digital/CD version ===
1. "Don't Give the Game Away" – 4:05
2. "Happier Than Sunshine" – 4:21
3. "Almost Persuaded" – 3:48
4. "Which Wrong Is Right?" (Connell, Drewery, Foster) – 3:43
5. "All in a Heartbeat (Late Night Version)" – 3:08
6. "Until Tomorrow Forgets" (Connell, Drewery, Foster) – 4:38
7. "I Wish I Knew" – 3:48
8. "Everybody's Here" – 3:40
9. "All in a Heartbeat" – 4:41
10. "Something Deep in Your Heart" (Connell, Drewery, Foster) – 3:37
11. "Be My Valentine" – 2:25
12. "Something Deep (Reprise)" – 3:43

==== Japanese bonus tracks ====
Professional ratings
Review scores
Source	Rating
Albumism	4.5/5 stars

1. "Never Let Me Go" – 4:06
2. "Never Let Me Go (Lullaby)" – 0:42

=== LP version ===
==== Side A ====
1. "Don't Give the Game Away"
2. "Happier Than Sunshine"
3. "Almost Persuaded"
4. "Which Wrong Is Right?"
5. "Everybody's Here"

==== Side B ====
1. "Until Tomorrow Forgets"
2. "I Wish I Knew"
3. "All In A Heartbeat"
4. "Something Deep in Your Heart"
5. "Be My Valentine"

== Charts ==
=== Weekly charts ===
Chart (2018)	Peak position
French Digital Albums Chart (SNEP)	140
Japanese Albums Chart (Oricon)	92
US Jazz Albums (Billboard)	7

== Personnel ==
Swing Out Sister

- Corinne Drewery – lead vocals
- Andy Connell – keyboards, acoustic piano, Fender bass, vibraphone

Additional musicians

- Tim Cansfield – guitars
- Dan Swana – double bass
- George Hart – drums
- Jody Linscott – congas, percussion
- Ben Castle – bass clarinet, baritone saxophone
- Mick Foster – bass clarinet, baritone saxophone
- Patrick Clahar – flutes, saxophones
- Kate Robertson – flutes, saxophones
- Pete Beachill – trombone
- Becky Smith – trombone
- Yazz Ahmed – trumpet, flugelhorn
- Lance Kelly – trumpet, flugelhorn
- Noel Langley – trumpet, flugelhorn
- Dave Lee – French horn
- Clare Moss – French horn
- Gina Foster – backing vocals

=== Production ===
- Swing Out Sister – producers, arrangements
- Yvonne Ellis – mix engineer
- Peter Beckmann – mastering at Technology/Works (London, UK)
- Vicki Shields – design, layout
- Gersende Giorgio – sleeve photography
