= Kaleidoscope World (Swing Out Sister album) =

Studio album by Swing Out Sister
- Released: 25 May 1989
- Genres: Pop; lounge
- Length: 59:40
- Label: Fontana
- Producers: Andy Connell; Corinne Drewery; Paul Staveley O'Duffy

Swing Out Sister chronology
It's Better to Travel (1987)	Kaleidoscope World (1989)	Get in Touch with Yourself (1992)

Singles from Kaleidoscope World
- 1. "You on My Mind" Released: May 1989; 2. "Where in the World" Released: 1989; 3. "Waiting Game" Released: 1989; 4. "Forever Blue" Released: 1989

Professional ratings
Review scores
Source	Rating
AllMusic	4/5 stars
Hi-Fi News & Record Review	B:1
New Musical Express	7/10
Record Mirror	4/5 stars

Kaleidoscope World is the second studio album by the British band Swing Out Sister. It was released in 1989 and features the singles "You on My Mind" (UK #28), "Where in the World?" (UK #47), "Forever Blue" (UK #80), and "Waiting Game". With the addition of an orchestra, this album features a more sophisticated, easy listening/retro sound than their previous synth-oriented debut album, 1987's It's Better to Travel. The album reached #9 on the UK Albums Chart.

== Background ==
The album was notable for being released on the newly reactivated Polygram subsidiary label Fontana Records, which had been a highly successful record label in the 1960s (something reflected in the stylised cover art for Kaleidoscope World). The album also features solos from the veteran harmonica player Tommy Reilly.

Original band member Martin Jackson left Swing Out Sister during the making of this album. Although the liner notes give "special thanks to Martin Jackson" and his co-writing credits appear on the songs "Tainted" and "Between Strangers", they also point out that "Swing Out Sister are Corinne Drewery and Andy Connell." Jimmy Webb arranged and conducted the orchestra for "Forever Blue" and "Precious Words."

== Video EP ==
In 1990 the video EP Kaleidoscope World – The Videos was released featuring videos for the singles and a video for "The Kaleidoscope Affair". Excerpts from "Coney Island Man" were also used as incidental music.

== Track listing ==
All tracks written by Andy Connell and Corinne Drewery, except where noted.

LP and cassette version

1. "You on My Mind" (Connell, Drewery, Paul Staveley O'Duffy) – 3:32
2. "Where in the World" – 5:33
3. "Forever Blue" – 4:17
4. "Heart For Hire" – 4:25
5. "Tainted" (Connell, Drewery, Martin Jackson) – 3:59
6. "Waiting Game" – 4:16
7. "Precious Words" – 4:13
8. "Masquerade" – 4:46
9. "Between Strangers" (Connell, Drewery, Jackson) – 4:06
10. "The Kaleidoscope Affair" – 3:09

CD version

1. "You on My Mind" – 3:32
2. "Where in the World" – 5:33
3. "Forever Blue" – 4:17
4. "Heart For Hire" – 4:25
5. "Tainted" – 3:59
6. "Waiting Game" – 4:16
7. "Precious Words" – 4:13
8. "Masquerade" – 4:46
9. "Between Strangers" – 4:06
10. "The Kaleidoscope Affair" – 3:09
11. "Coney Island Man" – 3:43
12. "Precious Words" (Instrumental) – 4:11
13. "Forever Blue" (String Mix) – 4:13
14. "Masquerade" (Instrumental) – 4:46

Notes

- The outro of track # 3, "Forever Blue", contains an interpolation of "Midnight Cowboy" (1969), written and performed by John Barry.

== Personnel ==
Adapted from the liner notes of Kaleidoscope World.

Swing Out Sister

- Corinne Drewery – lead vocals, brass arrangements (1, 4, 10), string arrangements (1, 4, 10), additional backing vocals (2)
- Andy Connell – keyboards, brass arrangements (1, 4, 5, 10), string arrangements (1, 2, 4, 5, 8–10, 14), additional backing vocals (2), drum programming (11)

Additional Musicians

- Martyn Phillips – synthesizers, computer programming
- Jess Bailey – string synthesizer (6)
- Tim Cansfield – guitars (1, 3, 4, 6, 7, 9), electric guitar (2, 10)
- Vini Reilly – Spanish guitar (2)
- Phil Palmer – guitars (6)
- Chris Whitten – drums (1–3, 10)
- Martin Jackson – drum programming (5, 7–10, 14)
- Luís Jardim – percussion (1–8, 10, 12, 14), berimbau (8, 14)
- Frank Ricotti – glockenspiel (2–4, 6, 13), vibraphone (2–4, 13), snare drum (4), timpani (4, 7, 12), percussion (6), tubular bells (6)
- Jamie Talbot – saxophones (1)
- Phil Todd – saxophones (1)
- Dan Higgins – saxophones (2, 9)
- Dave Bishop – saxophones (6)
- Snake Davis – saxophones (6)
- Pete Beachill – trombone (1, 6)
- Bill Reichenbach, Jr. – trombone (2, 9)
- John Thirkell - trumpet (1, 6)
- Guy Barker – trumpet (1, 6), flugelhorn (4)
- Simon Gardner – trumpet (1)
- Gary Grant – trumpet (2, 9)
- Jerry Hey – trumpet (2, 9), horn arrangements (2, 9)
- John Barclay – trumpet (6)
- Paul Staveley O'Duffy – brass arrangements (1, 4, 5, 10), string arrangements (1, 2, 4, 5, 10), drum programming (4, 6)
- Jimmy Webb – orchestra arrangements and conductor (3, 7, 12, 13)
- Richard Niles – brass and string arrangements (6)
- Stephanie de Sykes – backing vocals (1)
- Clare Torry – backing vocals (1)
- Chyna Gordon – backing vocals (2, 3, 6–8)
- Derek Green – backing vocals (2, 3, 6–8)
- Nat Augustin – backing vocals (3, 7, 8)
- Dee Lewis – backing vocals (3, 6–8)

Orchestra (Tracks 3 & 7)

- Gavyn Wright – leader
- Andrew Findon – flute
- Graham Ashton and Mike Hobart – flugelhorn
- John Pigneguy and John Rooke – French horn
- Tommy Reilly – harmonica
- Helen Liebmann, Paul Kegg, Ben Kennard and Roger Smith – cello
- Mike Brittain and Chris Laurence – double bass
- Fiona Hibbert – harp
- Levine Andrade, Roger Chase and David Emanuel – viola
- Jim Archer, Bill Benham, Mark Berrow, Elizabeth Edwards, Roger Garland, Wilf Gibson, Tim Good, John Kitchen, Peter Oxer, George Robertson, Godfrey Salmon, Rolf Wilson and Gavyn Wright – violin
- Lance Ellington – vocals

=== Production ===
- Producers – Paul Staveley O'Duffy (Tracks 1–10 & 12–14); Swing Out Sister (Track 11).
- Engineers – Paul Staveley O'Duffy (Tracks 1–10 & 12–14); Stuart James (Track 11).
- Additional Engineers – Howard Bernstein, Richard Edwards and Roland Herrington.
- Recorded at Lillie Yard Studios, Master Rock Studios and Sarm West Studios (London, UK).
- Sleeve Design – Trevor Johnson and Tony Panas
- Photography – Mark Bayley

== See also ==
- 1989 in music
