= You on My Mind =

Single by Swing Out Sister

from the album Kaleidoscope World
- B-side: "Coney Island Man"; "Precious Words" (Earth Bound Mix)
- Released: March 1989
- Recorded: 1988
- Genre: Synth-pop; pop; easy listening
- Length: 3:36 (Album Version); 6:32 (Extended Version)
- Label: Fontana Records
- Songwriters: Andy Connell; Corinne Drewery; Paul Staveley O'Duffy
- Producer: Paul Staveley O'Duffy

Swing Out Sister singles chronology
"Fooled by a Smile" (1987)	"You on My Mind" (1989)	"Waiting Game" (1989)

"You on My Mind" is a song by the British pop group Swing Out Sister. It was the lead-off single from the group's second album, Kaleidoscope World. It featured a more sophisticated blend of musical components.

== Music video ==
The music video was strongly inspired by the 1968 cult film, The Thomas Crown Affair.

== Releases ==
You On My Mind (Vinyl 7") 872964-7

1. "You On My Mind" (Album Version) - (3:36)
2. "Coney Island Man" - (3:38)

You On My Mind (CD Maxi) 874 229-2

1. "You On My Mind" (Album Version) - (3:36)
2. "Coney Island Man" - (3:38)
3. "Precious Words (Earth Bound Mix) - (3:46)
4. "You On My Mind" (12" Mix) - (6:32)

You On My Mind (Vinyl 12") 872 965-1, SWING 612

1. "You On My Mind" (Extended Version) - (6:32)
2. "You On My Mind" (Alternate Version) - (3:29)
3. "Coney Island Man" - (3:38)

== Charts ==
=== Weekly charts ===
Chart (1989)	Peak position
Belgium (Ultratop 50 Flanders)	26
France (SNEP)	44
Germany (GfK)	51
Ireland (IRMA)	26
Italy Airplay (Music & Media)	10
Netherlands (Single Top 100)	28
New Zealand (Recorded Music NZ)	32
UK Singles (OCC)	28
