= Swing Out Sister =

British pop band

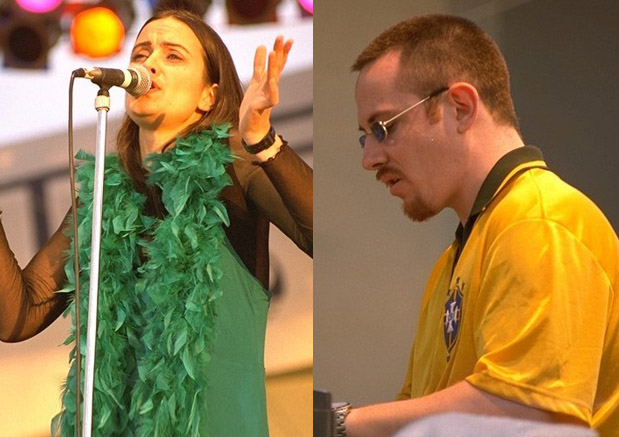
- Corinne Drewery and Andy Connell in 2006

Background information
- Origin: Manchester, England
- Genres: Pop; jazz; sophisti-pop
- Years active: 1985–present
- Labels: Mercury; Fontana; Shanachie
- Members: Andy Connell; Corinne Drewery
- Past members: Martin Jackson
- Website: swingoutsister.com

Swing Out Sister are a British pop band, best known worldwide for the 1986 song "Breakout". Other hits include "Surrender", "You On My Mind", "Twilight World", "Waiting Game", and a remake of the Eugene Record soul composition "Am I the Same Girl".

== History ==
Although Swing Out Sister is currently a duo, the group began as a trio in the UK. The band was formed by Andy Connell (keyboards) and Martin Jackson (drums); it was later joined by Corinne Drewery (vocals). According to the band's website, "They christened themselves after an obscure Billie Burke "B"-musical from the '40s because it was the only name they could agree upon - they all agreed they hated it." Both Connell and Jackson had been playing in other bands prior to forming Swing Out Sister, while Drewery was a fashion designer and model before she became the band's lead vocalist.

52nd Street's Diane Charlemagne was influential in the period just prior to the band signing with Phonogram Records. Connell and Jackson, outside of their usual roles as Manchester musicians in A Certain Ratio and Magazine, were producing Electro tracks for Morgan Khan's Streetwise label with a degree of underground success. This activity triggered interest from a few major labels including Phonogram/Mercury Records. Vocalised songs were asked for, so Connell, who knew Charlemagne through Factory Records, approached her to sing on the Phonogram demos. These demos helped secure Connell and Jackson's major-label contract. This was the period in which 52nd Street moved from Factory Records to Virgin Records and as a result, Diane Charlemagne's Swing Out Sister involvement ended.

=== Beginnings and debut album: It's Better to Travel (1985–1987) ===
Together with their producer, Paul Staveley O'Duffy, they signed with Mercury Records. Before their first album, they released the single "Blue Mood" in the UK in November 1985. However, it did not chart.

In late 1986, the single "Breakout" was released. It reached the number four position on the UK Singles Chart in November 1986, and number six on the Billboard Hot 100 chart in the United States, in November 1987.

When they released their debut album, It's Better to Travel, on 11 May 1987, it reached number one on the UK Albums Chart. The album blended real horns, synths (arranged subtly, to sound like strings), drums, and xylophones, scored by producer/arranger Richard Niles. The follow-up single to "Breakout" was "Surrender", which featured a trumpet solo performed by John Thirkell. It rose to number seven on the UK charts in January 1987. The next single was the more serious and jazzy "Twilight World". The final single, "Fooled By a Smile", returned to the upbeat pop orientation characteristic of "Breakout".

The band were subsequently nominated for two Grammy Awards in 1988: Best New Artist and Best Pop Vocal Performance by a Group or Duo ("Breakout").

In addition to long-time partner O'Duffy as well as Thirkell, Swing Out Sister have also enlisted the talents of saxophonist Gary Barnacle (who with Thirkell comprise the Phantom Horns, known for their work with Level 42), percussionist Luis Jardim, guitarist Tim Cansfield, trumpet/fluegelhorn master Jerry Hey, and songwriter-arranger Jimmy Webb.

=== Kaleidoscope World (1989) ===
Original member Jackson left the group during the making of the second album, Kaleidoscope World. Although the liner notes give "special thanks to Martin Jackson" and his co-writing credits appear on the songs "Tainted" and "Between Strangers", they also point out that "Swing Out Sister are Corinne Drewery and Andy Connell." Drewery and Connell have been the core on all subsequent albums.

Kaleidoscope World was released in May 1989, achieving critical acclaim and UK Top 10 success. Their turn away from contemporary styles towards retro musical sources on this album would establish the musical path that they would continue to follow with their subsequent albums. The duo found inspiration in Easy Listening music, such as Burt Bacharach, as well as songwriter Jimmy Webb, who arranged two tracks, "Forever Blue" and "Precious Words". The incorporation of an orchestra in their recordings realised their sound in a richer, fuller way than their previous effort which relied more heavily on synthesisers. Consequently, this album featured arrangements and songwriting more classical in inclination. The lead-off single "You on My Mind" featured a more sophisticated blend of musical components (the video was strongly inspired by the 1968 cult film The Thomas Crown Affair) than their previous efforts while the upbeat tone of "Breakout" was echoed in the lead U.S. single "Waiting Game". Further singles included "Where in the World" and "Forever Blue", which featured a descending phrase that reminds some people of the John Barry theme for the film Midnight Cowboy.

=== Get in Touch with Yourself (1992) ===
Now a duo of Drewery and Connell, Swing Out Sister put out their third album, Get in Touch with Yourself, in June 1992. With strong dance rhythms reverberating throughout the entire album, tracks draw influences from 1960s and 1970s jazz, pop, soul, and funk. A breezy cover version of the 1968 Barbara Acklin soul hit "Am I the Same Girl" became Swing Out Sister's last US hit, reaching No.1 on the adult contemporary chart. The album's title track, a blend of 1970s soul music and modern pop, gained the duo heavy airplay on smooth jazz radio and was a crossover hit, gaining airtime on adult contemporary stations as well. The musical influences of Stevie Wonder, The Jackson 5, Curtis Mayfield and others would become evident on this album but continue on through their later releases. In line with the album theme, Drewery also grew out her hair from her trademark bob which had become a visual signature for their early years.

=== The Living Return (1994) ===
Numerous changes were afoot by the time the fourth album, The Living Return, was released in September 1994. The replacement of producer Paul O'Duffy, after initial studio sessions with Ray Hayden, contributed to a looser, rawer feel to the songs that were often the results of studio jam sessions. Though Drewery and Connell still led Swing Out Sister, additional musicians, including former 52nd Street bassist Derick Johnson, Pa'lante percussionist Chris Manis, Jazz Defectors drummer Myke Wilson, and trumpet player John Thirkell, increased the group to ten members who replicated the live performances that had been captured on the Japan-only release Live at the Jazz Cafe. The album featured a cover of the Delfonics song "La-La (Means I Love You)", which was released as a single and was included on the soundtrack of the movie Four Weddings and a Funeral.

=== Shapes and Patterns (1997) ===
Few of the band's releases charted highly on the pop listings in Western countries after the successful debut album. The band, however, became extremely popular in Japan. Their song "Now You're Not Here" (from their fifth album Shapes And Patterns, one of several released in Japan before other parts of the world) was used as the theme to the Japanese TV programme "Mahiru No Tsuki", and it was ranked at No.10 on the Japanese chart and received a Japanese 'Grand Prix' (the equivalent of a Grammy Award) for best international single in 1997.

Shapes and Patterns was first released in Japan in March 1997, and then in Europe and USA the year after. Producer Paul O'Duffy, who co-wrote half of the songs, was back at the helm. As an orchestra was once again employed (led by Gavyn Wright), the lush arrangements characteristic of Kaleidoscope World resurfaced. The liner notes, written by composer/singer-songwriter Mary Edwards, point out the influences of Bacharach, Webb, and John Barry are perceptible in the string arrangements and Latin rhythms, as well as Minnie Riperton, Rotary Connection, and The 5th Dimension.

The album included a cover of Laura Nyro's "Stoned Soul Picnic" as well as the original version of "Better Make It Better", which appeared in a different mix on their previous album. A pervasive longing marks songs such as "Now You're Not Here", "Somewhere in the World" (their final US chart entry to date), "You Already Know", and "Icy Cold as Winter". This album would also mark the beginning of the duo's use of Japanese musicians in their studio sessions.

=== Filth and Dreams (1999) ===
Filth and Dreams, their sixth album, indicated that Swing Out Sister were eager to reinvent themselves again. The album was released in Japan in March 1999, and it remains the only album not released in any other country. This album featured stronger jazz leanings than some of their early pop-oriented albums, and it is restrained in mood. The track "Who's Been Sleeping" was promoted as a single and released with several remixes. "Who's Been Sleeping" has an aggressive beat and a few hip-hop flourishes. The rest of the record incorporates such sounds a bit more subtly, through the soaring retro stylings of "Closer Than the Sun" and "When Morning Comes" to the excitable lounge of the title track to the mid-tempo trip-hop of "Invisible" and scratch-laced "Sugar Free."

Traditional Swing Out Sister sounds are challenged on the album, using both darker sounds and topics. Digital techniques are present throughout, particularly on tracks "If I Had the Heart" and "Make You Stay." Background noises, from telephone conversations to child's play, also enrich the record, according to Albumism.

=== Somewhere Deep in the Night (2001) ===
A seventh album, Somewhere Deep in the Night, was recorded in France, and it was released in May 2001 in Japan (with subsequent release in Europe and U.S.). It was dedicated to their friend Kazuhiko Yanagida. While it is quintessential Swing Out Sister, with lush, brassy, and stringy arrangements, the melodic tunes often feature melancholic, languid, or introspective atmospherics and are more sombre in tone. Many of the tracks are instrumental or only feature vocal harmonies without lyrics. One song even features a French spoken-word monologue. O'Duffy, who produced the album, also has co-writing credits on all the songs and provided backing vocals along with Connell and Cansfield.

Due to declining sales, their record label Universal dropped them from their contract in America. Consequently, they signed on with Shanachie Records.

=== Where Our Love Grows (2004) ===
Undeterred, the band bounced back with their eighth studio effort, Where Our Love Grows. It was released in Japan on 28 April 2004 with the UK edition following in July. GQ Magazine reviewed it and called it "indisputably their finest record to date". The album features a return to a rich, upbeat retro-sound that fuses jazz, soul, R&B, Latin, and easy listening music. Samples of Roger Nichols and The Small Circle of Friends and Herbie Mann were incorporated also into some songs.

=== Beautiful Mess (2008) ===
Late 2005 saw Swing Out Sister return to its studio in London to commence recording of their new album. The band planned on making a second tour of America in 2006, but due to recording commitments it had to be cancelled. In 2006, they composed incidental music for the ITV1 drama The Outsiders, which featured Nigel Harman. August 2007 saw a new single, "Secret Love", co-written by Morgan Fisher.

The new album from the band was titled Beautiful Mess and was released by the Japanese record company Avex on 27 February 2008. The title is taken from one of the tracks on the album. Prior to its release in late December 2007, two other tracks were made available for download: "Butterfly" and "Something Every Day". The album was released in the UK in August 2008 and in the U.S. in May 2009, reaching the Top 5 on the Jazz Album chart in the US.

=== 2008–2009 Asia tour ===
In 2008 and 2009, Swing Out Sister went back on tour and appeared at the Jakarta Convention Center, Indonesia, then toured several venues in Japan in Tokyo, Nagoya, Osaka, and Fukuoka, and then in the Philippines.

Further activities in 2009

In 2009, the group played at Bimbos in San Francisco. The group had a new line up for the show and only one back up singer, Gina Foster. The show kicked off with "Surrender". They then performed "World Out of Control". They performed "Breakout" with a jazz leaning. With Foster's powerful voice adding to Corinne Drewery's, it compensated for the lack of additional vocal backers. Foster performed one of her own songs, "Expect a Miracle". They finished with "Stoned Soul Picnic".

=== 2012: 25th anniversary ===
2012 marked the 25th anniversary of the group's first album, It's Better to Travel. The album was reissued on 16 July 2012 as a double CD set including the original album plus B-sides, rarities and remixes. On 14 July 2012, Swing Out Sister performed in its "big band" form at Islington Assembly Hall. 500 limited edition 10" singles of "Love Won't Let You Down (Olympic Mix)" and "Breakout (Fabulous Party Mix)" were released to coincide with this landmark London show.

Tokyo Stories, a DVD from the group's 2010 performance at Billboard Japan, is a region 2 DVD and was released on 18 July 2012.

Private View + 2 CD was also released in July 2012. Originally, Private View was available only through the band's Facebook page. The "+2" version is updated and includes two new tracks. The CD features an acoustic take on some of the group's hits.

=== 2014: A Moveable Feast ===
In March 2014, the group announced a project titled 'A Moveable Feast' to be released via Direct-to-Fan music platform PledgeMusic, saying: "We're making a thing, don't know what it is yet. Come along for the ride and we'll find out together."

In September 2015, Swing out Sister shipped their album, Rushes, to those who had signed up to the pledge; this included short samples of the songs that Swing Out Sister were writing for the 'Moveable Feast' project. The content was also available as downloadable MP3 tracks to those who donated money to support the development of the album.

=== 2017: Almost Persuaded ===
In November 2017, they released the culmination of the project, Almost Persuaded. The album was scheduled for general release in June 2018.

On 13 November 2018, Swing Out Sister performed at Islington Assembly Hall in support of the album. Also in 2018, they were booked to play at the Blue Note Jazz Club in Milano. The line up consisted of Corinne Drewery and Gina Foster on vocals, Andy Connell on keyboards, Tim Cansfield on guitar, Myke Wilson on drums, Juneroy on bass and Jody Linscott on percussion.

== Personal life ==
On 2 June 2026, a post on the Swing Out Sister Instagram page indicated that Connell and Drewery had married in London.

== Discography ==
=== Studio albums ===
- It's Better to Travel (1987)
- Kaleidoscope World (1989)
- Get in Touch with Yourself (1992)
- The Living Return (1994)
- Shapes and Patterns (1997)
- Filth and Dreams (1999)
- Somewhere Deep in the Night (2001)
- Where Our Love Grows (2004)
- Beautiful Mess (2008)
- Private View (2012) (new versions of band songs)
- Almost Persuaded (2017)
