= John Thirkell =

British trumpet and flugelhorn player

- Born: John Thirkell
- Occupation: Musician
- Instruments: Trumpet; flugelhorn

John Thirkell is a British trumpet and flugelhorn player, who has appeared on hundreds of pop, rock, and jazz recordings. Through the 1980s and early 1990s, he was on at least one album in the UK Charts continuously, without a break, for over 13 years. In 2009, he had two consecutive UK No.1 singles with Pixie Lott and was the first person to be inducted into the Musician's Union "Hall of Fame." One of his recent number-one albums that he performed on includes Olly Murs' seventh studio album Marry Me (2022). According to Thirkell's own research, he has performed on 36 number-one albums, with his 36th occurring on Shania Twain's sixth studio album Queen of Me (2023).

He is also known for playing with Level 42 in partnership with fellow Brit and saxophonist Gary Barnacle.

His other credits include work with artists such as Rod Stewart, George Michael, Lisa Stansfield, Jamiroquai, UB40, Cher, Tina Turner, Pet Shop Boys, Swing Out Sister, Spice Girls, BTS, and many more, along with stints in the Buddy Rich Band and Gil Evans Orchestra. He is also the producer of covers band Red Sauce.

== Credits ==
- Level 42 Forever Now (Resurgent) Group Member
- Level 42 Guaranteed – Group Member
- Jamiroquai Emergency on Planet Earth – Trumpet, Horn Arrangements
- Jamiroquai "Bad Girls" Live – Trumpet
- Jamiroquai The Return of the Space Cowboy – Trumpet, Horn Arrangements
- George Michael Older – Flugelhorn, Upper Flugelhorn & Trumpet
- BTS – Dynamite – Trumpet
- Pixie Lott Mama Do – Trumpet
- Pixie Lott Boys and Girls – Trumpet
- Paul Weller On Sunset – Trumpet, Flugelhorn
- UB40 Labour of Love II – Trumpet
- Swing Out Sister Breakout – Trumpet
- Swing Out Sister Surrender – Trumpet
- Tina Turner Simply the Best – Trumpet
- Jools Holland World of His Own – Trumpet
- Phil Collins Prince's Trust Concert 1987 & 2010 – Trumpet, Flugelhorn
- Status Quo Don't Stop: 30th Anniversary Album – Trumpet, Flugelhorn
- Westlife My Girl – Trumpet
- Westlife What Becomes of the Broken Hearted – Trumpet
- Lisa Stansfield Lisa Stansfield – Horn Arrangements, Trumpet
- Lisa Stansfield Swing – Trumpet
- Lisa Stansfield Seven
- Queen Princes Trust 2010 – Trumpet/Flugelhorn
- Kylie Minogue Fever – Flute, Trumpet
- Kylie Minogue Let's Get To It – Trumpet
- Kylie Minogue Better the Devil You Know – Trumpet
- Tom Jones Reload) – Flugelhorn, Trumpet
- Spandau Ballet Heart Like a Sky – Trumpet, Flugelhorn
- M People Bizarre Fruit – Trumpet, Flugelhorn
- Prefab Sprout Jordan: The Comeback – Trumpet, Flugelhorn
- Frankie Goes to Hollywood Liverpool – Trumpet, Flugelhorn
- Take That Nobody Else – Trumpet
- ABC Lexicon of Love – Trumpet, Flugelhorn
- Roger Waters Radio Kaos – Trumpet, Flugelhorn
- Bros Changing Faces – Trumpet
- Eric Clapton Prince's Trust Concert 1987 & 2010 – Trumpet, Flugelhorn
- Stereo MC's Connected – Trumpet
- Randy Crawford Rich & Poor – Trumpet
- Katrina and the Waves Walking on Sunshine – Trumpet
- Natalie Imbruglia Satellite – Trumpet, Flugelhorn
- Culture Club Your Kisses Are Charity – Trumpet
- The Style Council Have You Ever Had It Blue – Trumpet
- Lionel Richie Renaissance – Trumpet, Flugelhorn
- The The Infected (Sony Reissue) – Trumpet
- The The Dusk (Sony Reissue) – Trumpet
- Anastacia One Day in Your Life (Import Single) – Trumpet
- Cher Living Proof (Japan Bonus Track) – Flugelhorn, Trumpet
- George Harrison Princes Trust Concert 1987 – Trumpet, Flugelhorn
- Ringo Starr Princes Trust Concert 1987 – Trumpet, Flugelhorn
- Miriam Stockley Second Nature – Trumpet
- Swing Out Sister Live at the Jazz Cafe – Flugelhorn, Trumpet
- Byron Stingily Club Stories (Import Bonus Tracks)
- Culture Club Don't Mind If I Do – Trumpet
- Jakko Jakszyk The Road to Ballina – Trumpet
- Tom Jones Reload – Trumpet
- Maxi Priest CombiNation – Trumpet
- Dany Brillant Nouveau Jour – Arranger, Trumpet
- Tina Turner Wildest Dreams – Trumpet
- M People Fresco – Trumpet
- Right Said Fred Smashing! – Trumpet
- Angélique Kidjo Fifa – Trumpet
- Angélique Kidjo Aye – Trumpet
- Swing Out Sister Living Return – Flugelhorn, Trumpet
- Pet Shop Boys Very – Conductor, Brass
- Pet Shop Boys Relentless – Brass
- Clive Griffin Clive Griffin – Trumpet
- Swing Out Sister Get in Touch with Yourself – Flugelhorn, Trumpet
- 29 Palms Fatal Joy – Flugelhorn, Trumpet
- The Beautiful South Welcome to the Beautiful South – Flugelhorn, Trumpet
- The Beautiful South Carry On Up the Charts – Flugelhorn, Trumpet
- The Sugarcubes Here Today, Tomorrow Next Week! – Trumpet
- Jimmy Somerville Read My Lips – Trumpet
- Tony Banks Bankstatement – Trumpet
- Randy Crawford Rich and Poor – Brass
- Clive Griffin Step by Step – Overdubs
- Toni Childs Union – Horn
- Hothouse Flowers People – Brass
- Was (Not Was) What Up, Dog? – Brass, Overdubs
- Grace Jones Slave to the Rhythm – Percussion, Trumpet
- Elaine Paige Stages – Flugelhorn
- Pixie Lott Mama Do – Trumpet
- Pixie Lott Boys & Girls – Trumpet
- James Morrison 'Songs For You, Truths For Me' – Trumpet & Flugelhorn
- Kiri Te Kanawa 'World in Union' – Trumpet
- Jamie Cullum – Princes Trust 2010
- Paloma Faith – Princes Trust 2010
- The Who – Hurtwood Park 2014
- Jeff Beck – Hurtwood Park 2014
- Bruno Mars Uptown Funk – Trumpet
- The Faces – Hurtwood Park 2015
- BTS Dynamite – Trumpet
- Olly Murs Marry Me – Trumpet
