= Martin Jackson =

British drummer (born 1955)

- Born: 30 August 1955 (age 71); Manchester, England
- Occupations: Drummer, studio musician
- Instruments: Drums, keyboards
- Years active: 1975–1994

Martin Jackson (born 30 August 1955) is a retired British drummer who played with several bands from Manchester, although his most successful roles were with Magazine in 1978 with the release of the influential Real Life album, and Swing Out Sister in 1986, with the hit song "Breakout".

== Biography ==
His earliest work was alongside Chris Sievey, with whom he formed The Bees Knees, recording unreleased material, and The Freshies, around the mid-1970s.

In 1977, he answered an ad placed by ex-Buzzcocks Howard Devoto, who solicited musicians to form a new band, and joined the fledgling Magazine, which began to be very influential among future rock musicians. He took part in the recording of the "Shot By Both Sides" single which the band performed on Top of the Pops, and the album Real Life. But after the British tour for the album, he left in late July 1978.

His whereabouts were unknown until 1982, when he joined The Chameleons briefly to replace John Lever, departing in 1983 when the latter rejoined. He appeared in some songs of the live compilation Here Today... ...Gone Tomorrow.

In 1984, he teamed up with DJ Greg Wilson and keyboardist friend Andy Connell to create an album called UK Electro. Connell and Jackson later collaborated with Design 9, alongside Steven Murray of the power-pop band Fast Cars and Haydn Rydings from Two-Tone Pinks but they left the project to form Swing Out Sister with singer Corinne Drewery in 1985. Jackson played drums on their debut album in 1987, but left the band in the middle of recording Swing Out Sister's second album Kaleidoscope World.

He also worked with The Durutti Column, playing on the Sex and Death album released in 1994.
