= Breakout (Swing Out Sister song) =

1986 single by Swing Out Sister

Single by Swing Out Sister

from the album It's Better to Travel
- B-side: "Dirty Money"
- Released: 29 September 1986
- Genre: Sophisti-pop; synth-pop
- Length: 3:48
- Label: Mercury
- Songwriters: Andy Connell; Corinne Drewery; Martin Jackson
- Producer: Paul Staveley O'Duffy

Swing Out Sister singles chronology
"Blue Mood" (1985)	"Breakout" (1986)	"Surrender" (1987)

"Breakout" is a song by British band Swing Out Sister. It was released in September 1986 as the second single from their debut album It's Better to Travel. Written and performed while the group was still a trio, it became one of their biggest hits, reaching the number four in the United Kingdom; in the US, it rose in 1987 to number six on the Billboard Hot 100 and number one on the Billboard Adult Contemporary chart. The song was nominated for Best Pop Vocal Performance by a Duo or Group at the 30th Annual Grammy Awards in 1988.

== Background ==
Lead singer Corinne Drewery wrote the song while recovering from a fractured skull she had suffered in an equestrian accident. Swing Out Sister had already signed a two-song deal with Mercury Records, but the first song, "Blue Mood", had failed to chart. Mercury said the band had to have their second demo in by the next Monday morning or risk being dropped, causing the band to compose "Breakout" under stress. This influenced the lyrics, as Drewery was inspired primarily by her decision to give up on a much more secure career as a fashion designer to pursue her dream of being a singer. There was some controversy around the bass line used in the song; it was claimed that the band had taken it from an unpublished Elezze Records track, and the band argued that they had created the line on their own after listening to the 1986 FIFA World Cup TV theme in Britain.

== Music video ==
The music video for "Breakout" features lead singer Corinne Drewery as a fashion designer, who with the assistance of the other two band members designs and makes her own dress, and later makes a successful runway debut, modelling the garment while her bandmates open a bottle of champagne and toast to her success. There are two versions of this video; the official monochrome version and the alternative colour version. The video was directed by Nick Willing.

== Critical reception ==
Jerry Smith of the Music Week magazine praised "Breakout", describing it a "bubbling, dynamic number with irresistible rhythm and powerful, melodic vocals, backed by rousing horns and sweeping strings", and deemed it a potential hit. Similarly, Stuart Bailie of Record Mirror stated the song "is breezy, buoyant and it's tasteful" and "a good record". In the same issue of the magazine, James Hamilton complimented the N.A.D. mix as being a "rather pleasant and convincing jazz-funk".

== Charts ==
=== Weekly charts ===
Weekly chart performance for "Breakout"
Chart (1986–1987)	Peak position
Australia (Kent Music Report)	12
Belgium (Ultratop 50 Flanders)	17
Canada Top Singles (RPM)	18
Canada Adult Contemporary (RPM)	2
Europe (European Hot 100)	38
Europe (European Airplay Top 50)	13
Ireland (IRMA)	6
Italy Airplay (Music & Media)	3
Netherlands (Dutch Top 40)	30
Netherlands (Single Top 100)	34
New Zealand (Recorded Music NZ)	4
UK Singles (Official Charts)	4
UK Airplay (Music & Media)	1
US Billboard Hot 100	6
US 12-inch Singles Sales (Billboard) Remix	10
US Adult Contemporary (Billboard)	1
US Dance Club Play (Billboard) Remix	12
US Cash Box Top 100	5
West Germany (GfK)	27

=== Year-end charts ===
1986 year-end chart performance for "Breakout"
Chart (1986)	Position
UK Singles (OCC)	51

1987 year-end chart performance for "Breakout"
Chart (1987)	Position
Australia (Australian Music Report)	59
New Zealand (RIANZ)	15
US Billboard Hot 100	66
US Adult Contemporary (Billboard)	48

1988 year-end chart performance for "Breakout"
Chart (1988)	Position
Brazil (Crowley)	60

== Certifications ==
Region	Certification	Certified units/sales
United Kingdom (BPI)	Silver	250,000^{^}
^{^} Shipments figures based on certification alone.

== See also ==
- List of number-one adult contemporary singles of 1987 (U.S.)
