= Paul Staveley O'Duffy =

- Born: 31 December 1963 (age 62)
- Origin: London, England
- Genres: Synthpop, soul, film score, electronic
- Occupation: Record producer
- Label: Imagem Music
- Website: Official website

Paul Staveley O'Duffy (born 31 December 1963, London) is a British record producer, composer and mixer. He is best known for producing Swing Out Sister's multi-platinum debut album It's Better to Travel, for his BMI nomination as "Producer of the Year" in 1987, his work with John Barry and his work with Amy Winehouse, which resulted in his co-writing one of the tracks on her multi-platinum album Back to Black.

== Professional life ==
=== Mixer / engineer ===
O'Duffy started out his music career at Marcus Music Studios London, and by the age of 17 was engineering sessions for War, Yes and Marvin Gaye. He moved to New York in 1984, establishing himself as a club remixer working on remixes for artists such as KC and the Sunshine Band, Man Parrish, Stephanie Mills, the System, Animotion, the Bar-Kays, Patti LaBelle, Ian Dury and the Blockheads and Freeez.

=== Production ===
O'Duffy returned to London in the late eighties where his remixing successes took him into record production. His first production success was the debut album by Scottish group Hipsway which included the top twenty hit on both sides of the Atlantic, "The Honeythief". He followed this up with production on the number one platinum-selling debut album by Curiosity Killed the Cat, Keep Your Distance.

His BMI nomination for Producer of the Year in 1987 came from his work on the multi-platinum debut album It's Better to Travel by Manchester group Swing Out Sister, which included the worldwide hit "Breakout". The album was also nominated in the US for a Grammy Award and led to more work for him and his distinctive retro sound with US acts.

One of these was the band Was (Not Was) with the resulting worldwide hits "Walk the Dinosaur", "Spy in the House of Love" and platinum-selling album What Up, Dog?. At the other end of the spectrum, O'Duffy produced one of Barry Manilow's last chart hits, "Keep Each Other Warm" from his eponymous album Barry Manilow, in which Manilow recorded other artists' songs using a variety of top producers.

O'Duffy additionally produced and mixed Television frontman Tom Verlaine's fifth solo album Flash Light in 1987.

In 2009, he produced John Barry's unreleased orchestral album, The Seasons.

=== Writer/producer ===
In the 1990s, O'Duffy increased his songwriting credits, producing and writing on four subsequent albums for Swing Out Sister (including 1992's Get in Touch with Yourself) as well as production for Dusty Springfield on her album Reputation, which became Springfield's best-selling new album since her 1960s-era peak. He produced the Pretenders' "If There Was a Man" and "Where Has Everybody Gone?", as well as Necros, Frankie Goes to Hollywood, Jeff Beck, Lisa Stansfield, Danny Wilson, the Beloved, John Barry, the eponymous debut album by Lewis Taylor, and Pigeonhed.

In the 2000s, O'Duffy continued to collaborate with artists and songwriters including Charlotte OC, Låpsley, Purple Ferdinand, Andreya Triana and Ella Eyre.

=== Hiatus and recovery ===
An amateur racer of both off-road and on-road motorcycles, O'Duffy was riding a road bike in London when a car cut across his lane and ran him down. His back was broken in two places, and he spent many months in traction and several years in recovery. His motorcycle, a Ducati 851 which had been given to him by his then management team, was repaired and presented back to him after a chance meeting with Federico Minoli, then head of Ducati worldwide, at the Houses of Parliament. Fully recovered after further surgery to fuse his back.

During the first three years after the accident, O'Duffy worked almost exclusively out of the substantial studio he had built at his home in North London. It was here that Amy Winehouse came to spend a month in 2006 to work on tracks for what became the Back to Black album, which features the O'Duffy/Winehouse song "Wake up Alone".

=== Film and television ===
O'Duffy produced the John Barry score for 007 film The Living Daylights (winner, 1988 BMI Film Music Award).

Further work with Barry continued, including in 1992 the movie Chaplin starring Robert Downey Jr., for which Barry was nominated for an Oscar and a Golden Globe. O'Duffy worked with John Barry on his UK concerts at the Albert Hall.

O'Duffy produced the Hans Zimmer score for the film Days of Thunder (winner, 1991 BMI Film Music Award) and the version of "All by Myself" used in the film Bridget Jones's Diary. He also produced the Dr. Calculus track "Full of Love" for the 1988 Kevin Bacon film She's Having a Baby.

O'Duffy is also a well-known composer for television, having composed the themes and incidental music for: The Team – A Season with Mclaren (BBC2 series) The Great Outdoors (Channel 4 series) The Big Elsewhere (with Swing Out Sister, NHK Japan series) London Bridge (Carlton TV drama series).
