= Andy Connell =

English keyboardist and composer

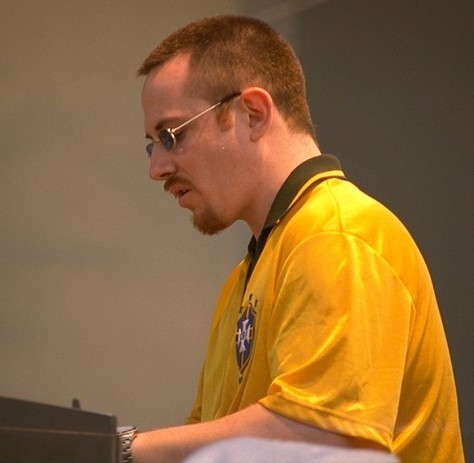
- Connell performing in Miami Beach, Florida, 2006

Background information
- Born: Andrew John Connell; 26 July 1961 (age 65); Manchester, England
- Occupations: Keyboardist; composer; arranger
- Instruments: Keyboards; piano
- Years active: 1978–present
- Member of: Swing Out Sister
- Formerly of: A Certain Ratio
- Website: legrandlarge.blogspot.com

Andrew John Connell (born 26 July 1961) is an English keyboardist and composer. Along with Corinne Drewery, he is part of the duo that makes up Swing Out Sister.

== Biography ==
Born in Manchester, Connell played in the Manchester post-punk band The Immediates, before joining new wave funk pioneers, A Certain Ratio. He was also a member of the Manchester-based jazz/pop band Kalima who were signed to Factory Records, whilst he was also a member of A Certain Ratio. A few years later he teamed up with former Magazine drummer Martin Jackson and Greg Wilson, and they released an inventive electronic album called UK Electro in 1984.

Swing Out Sister began in earnest in 1985, when Connell and Jackson teamed up with Corinne Drewery. Since the band's establishment, he has been the main composer and arranger for Swing Out Sister's music, including the UK and US top ten hit, "Breakout".

Apart from his work with Swing Out Sister, Connell has produced and arranged music for other artists, and recently he wrote the musical score for a short film called The Knickerman, directed by Sonja Phillips. He also contributed to Quando Quango's album, Pigs & Battleships.

Connell married Swing Out Sister bandmate Corinne Drewery in 2026.

An avid Manchester City fan, Connell is an occasional contributor to The Man City Show Podcast alongside Nigel Rothband and Rob Behrens.
