= Corinne Drewery =

British singer

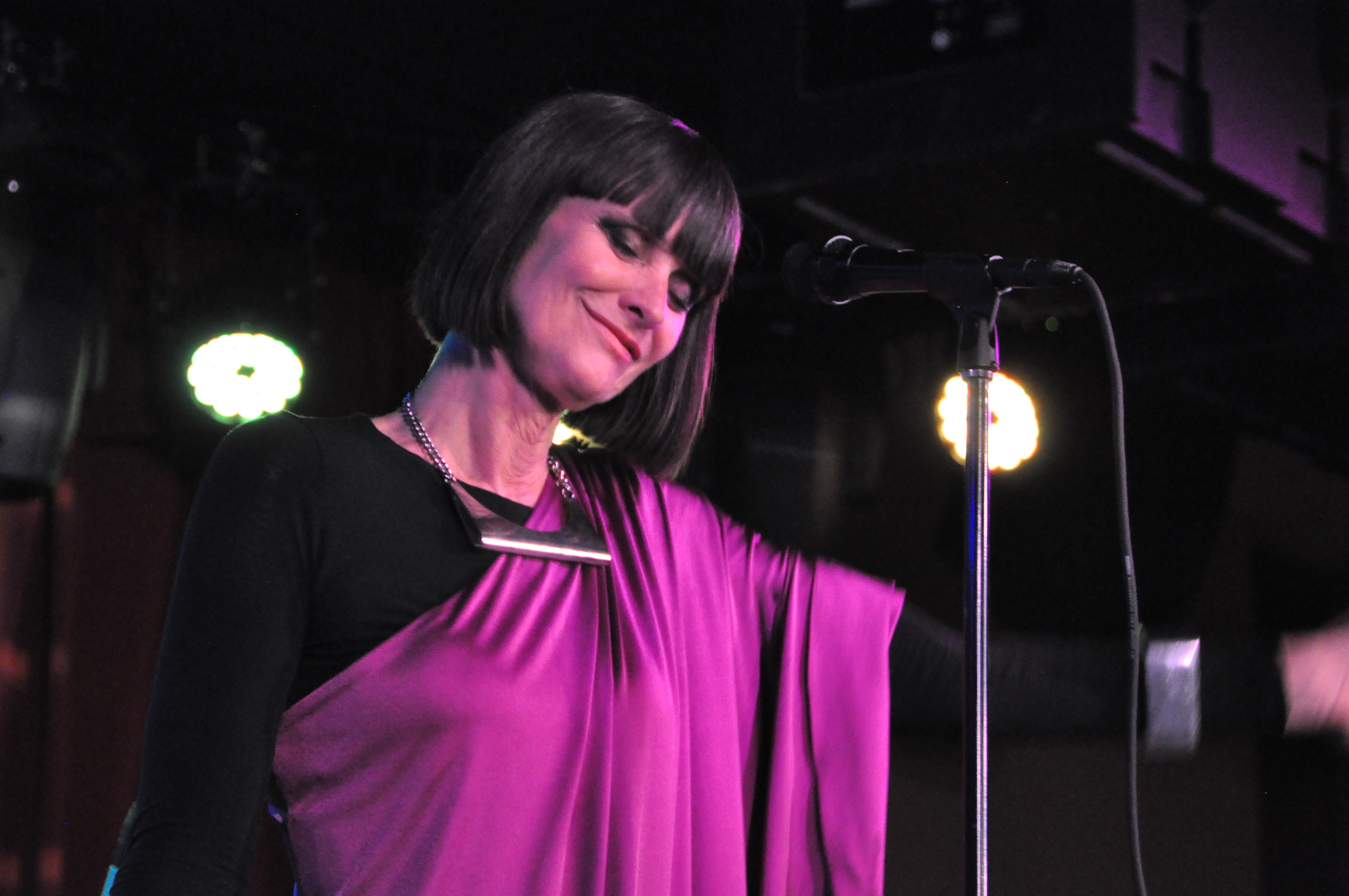
- Drewery performing in 2013

Background information
- Born: 21 September 1959 (age 67); Nottingham, England
- Genres: Sophisti-pop; pop
- Occupations: Musician; composer; fashion designer
- Instrument: Vocals
- Years active: 1984–present
- Labels: Avex Trax; Shanachie
- Member of: Swing Out Sister
- Website: Official Swing Out Sister Website

Corinne Drewery (born 21 September 1959) is an English singer-songwriter and fashion designer, best known for being the lead vocalist of the band Swing Out Sister.

== Personal life ==
Drewery was born in Nottingham. She later moved to the Lincolnshire village of Authorpe and went to South Reston Primary School, then Monks' Dyke High School and King Edward VI Grammar School in nearby Louth, then Lincoln College. She grew up listening to classic pop standards, as her father played in a band that provided regular support to famous stars such as Tom Jones and Sandie Shaw. Drewery was strongly influenced by Northern soul, visiting performances at the Winter Gardens in Cleethorpes, and referred to Northern soul tracks during an extensive interview on BBC Radio Nottingham. Her mother, Elaine Drewery, a former singer, is the founder of Hedgehog Care in Authorpe. Her brother Anton was also a singer and musician whose debut studio album, With a Little Help, was released posthumously in August 2022, six months after his death. She married the other major member of Swing Out Sister, Andy Connell, in June 2026.

== Music ==
In 1976, after leaving school, Drewery moved to London to study fashion at the Central Saint Martins College of Art and Design and eventually became a fashion designer. But she also sang for short periods with bands such as Working Week.

She first met Andy Connell and Martin Jackson in 1984 and together they formed Swing Out Sister. In 1986–87 the group achieved success on both sides of the Atlantic with "Breakout", the band's signature song.

Drewery is not only the band's lyricist, but its composer together with her musical partner, Connell.

In 1986, she provided additional vocals on the track "Bootsy" by Connell's former band A Certain Ratio. The song was released exclusively as a single in Australia and featured on their fifth studio album Force.

In 2022, Drewery sang with Ryan Bland of Ache on the 24-7 Spyz track "Angels & Demons."
