= Badman (album) =

Studio album by Richard Jobson
- Released: November 1988
- Length: 36:17
- Label: Parlophone
- Producers: Adam Moseley; Ian Broudie; Howard Gray; Harvey Goldberg; James Biondolillo; Richard Jobson

Badman is the debut solo studio album from Scottish singer-songwriter Richard Jobson, released by Parlophone in November 1988.

== Background ==
The majority of the tracks on Badman originated as recordings made by the Armoury Show, featuring Richard Jobson (vocals) and Russell Webb (bass) as its two key members. After a period of inactivity following the Armoury Show's 1985 debut album Waiting for the Floods and a tour to promote it, the two remaining band members Jobson and Webb reunited as a duo and began working on new material from late 1986 under the Armoury Show name, including the tracks "Love in Anger", "New York City", "Fire" and "A Boat Called Pride". With their original contract with EMI America coming to an end, they signed a new deal with the UK division of EMI's Parlophone and, to replace their former bandmates, subsequently recruited guitarist Dave Lockwood and drummer Ray Weston in early 1987. Two singles were during that year: "Love in Anger" in January 1987 and "New York City" in April 1987.

The album Monkey Cry was recorded between 1986 and 1987, with Ian Broudie and Howard Gray involved in its production. It was originally due to be released in May 1987 and was to include nine tracks: "When Monkey's Cry", "A Boat Called Pride", "Love in Anger", "New York City", "This Thing Called Love", "Fire", "The Heat Is On", "The River" and another unnamed track. The album's release was subsequently postponed to late 1987 and was to follow a new single scheduled for release in October 1987. These plans were postponed once again to avoid the Christmas period, with the single due in January 1988 and the album in February 1988.

In January 1988, it was announced that the Armoury Show had disbanded, but with both Jobson and Webb remaining signed to EMI as solo artists. By this time, the decision had been made to rework Monkey Cry as a Jobson solo album under the working title A Boat Called Pride. A single was originally scheduled for release in March 1988, with the album to follow in April 1988, but this was eventually postponed to August and November 1988 respectively. Five of the tracks intended for Monkey Cry appeared on Badman. The singles "Love in Anger" and "New York City" were not included, although "Uptown/Downtown", which originally appeared on the 12-inch format of "Love in Anger", is a reworking of "Love in Anger" and features the same backing track but with different lyrics, including quotes by German-American poet and writer Charles Bukowski.

== Single ==
The title track was released as the album's only single on 30 August 1988. The song was inspired by Edinburgh and, as revealed by Jobson to Music Week in 1988, about how "the American fleet came in after manoeuvres on the north coast of Scotland, and six months later there was an epidemic of heroin, followed by AIDS". It failed to reach the top 100 of the UK Singles Chart, but did peak at number 20 on Music Week's 'The Other Chart' on 17 September 1988.

== Critical reception ==
Professional ratings
Review scores
Source	Rating
NME	4/10
Record Mirror	1/5 stars

Upon its release, reviews were largely negative. Pete Paisley of Record Mirror called the album "shameless grade A rubbish" and wrote, "Way back when, Jobbo and his mate Stuart Adamson were in a sparky little combo called the Skids – happy days when the man's aesthetic athleticism was given full reign. Now our Dick has Side One of his newie sounding like bum Heaven 17 and Side Two like bum Big Country." Dave Jennings of Melody Maker felt Badman "represents a failed attempt to create something huge and expansive" and instead "lack[s] fresh ideas and anything much to say". He noted that the material was Jobson's "most dance-oriented" and, while he "bellows boldly and proudly throughout", the lyrics are "most often nothing to be proud of". He considered the production to be the "most consistently admirable component", describing it as "generally glossy but nevertheless capable of springing surprises".

John Tague of NME considered it "underwhelming, bland, late '80s studio gloss" that "could have been made by any one of 100 artists", with a "patchwork of producers and musicians lacking personality and any sense of individuality". Marcus Hodge of the Cambridge Evening News felt the "watery, directionless album doesn't bode well for a full-blown musical career". He continued, "He is at best remembering his days in the Skids with tracks like 'A Boat Called Pride'. The slower ones only highlight his very ordinary voice and lyrics that belong to a television personality, not an alleged poet." North Wales Weekly News noted that, although it was a "polished and professional effort", "you can't help feeling irritated that, after the two long years it took to complete, the result could have been slightly more memorable".

== Track listing ==
All tracks are written by Richard Jobson and Russell Webb except where noted.

No.	Title	Writer(s)	Length
1.	"Badman"	Jobson, Adam Moseley	3:48
2.	"This Thing Called Love"		3:43
3.	"Monkey's Cry"		3:20
4.	"Uptown/Downtown"		6:32
5.	"A Boat Called Pride"		4:28
6.	"Angel"	Ben Watt, Tracey Thorn	4:43
7.	"The Heat Is On"	Jobson, Webb, Ray Weston	4:59
8.	"Fire"		4:44

Bonus track on CD and cassette editions
No.	Title	Writer(s)	Length
9.	"Big Fat City"	Jobson, Billy Currie	5:32

== Personnel ==
Production

- Adam Moseley – production (track 1), remixing (tracks 2, 8), additional recording (track 8)
- Ian Broudie – production (tracks 2, 3, 5, 7, 8)
- Howard Gray – production (track 4)
- Harvey Goldberg – production (track 6)
- James Biondolillo – production (track 6)
- Richard Jobson – production (track 9)

Other

- Gavin Evans/Cut Magazine – photography
- Jason O'Mara – design
