= Castles in Spain (disambiguation) =

Castles in Spain may refer to:

- List of castles in Spain
- Castles in Spain (film), a 1920 British silent drama film
- Castles in Spain, a card game that is a variation of Baker's Dozen (solitaire)
- "Castles in Spain", a song by The Armoury Show from the album Waiting for the Floods
- "Castles in Spain", a 1986 play by Edward Boyd subsequently adapted for radio
