= Jean Roger Harripaul =

British singer-songwriter

- Born: London, England
- Occupations: Singer-songwriter, musician
- Instruments: Guitar, drums, bass guitar, vocals
- Years active: 1980s–present
- Labels: RCA Records, Urban Sounds, Ravensbourne Records
- Website: hotvox.co.uk/artist/harripaul

Jean Roger Harripaul is a British singer-songwriter.

Harripaul was born in London where he grew up exposed to a wide range of music genres. As well as being a singer-songwriter, he was also a session guitarist, drummer, and bass player. Harripaul has previously worked as a session guitarist with The Christians, Dubstar, Russell Webb of Skids, The Armoury Show, Billy McKenzie of the Associates and Julian Cope.

Under the name Roger Jean Harripaul, he had two singles out in 1988/1989 - "Memories of a Golden Dream" which charted in UK Singles Chart at number 97 in 1988, and "Cover Girl" which was a hit in Germany. He signed to RCA Records in the 1980s but was dropped later on. In 2001, Harripaul signed to Urban Sounds and The Time For Change album was released and secured a support role with Roachford during this period.

In 2004, he formed a new band called 'Harripaul' and were signed to Ravensbourne Records. The Live Your Life album was released on 1 January 2005 and sold well in Japan and had good reviews from Simon Rueben.

In 2012, 'Harripaul' signed to Urban Sounds and Swings and Roundabouts was released. The album was played on BBC Radio Cambridgeshire, by Sue Marchant on BBC Three Counties Radio and on other UK radio stations. In 2019 Jean had a number 1 single in Scotland with Living in this world.

https://youtube.com/shorts/cyjF9UWzsAo?featur In 2023 Jean worked with Mel Gaynor of Simple Minds on the Harripaul new single Why the long face.
