= One Thousand Years of Trouble =

Studio album by Age of Chance
- Released: 1987
- Studio: Trident Studios, London
- Genre: Alternative dance; funk
- Length: 35:51
- Label: Virgin
- Producer: Age of Chance, Howard Gray

Age of Chance chronology
Kiss Crush Collision (1986)	One Thousand Years of Trouble (1987)	Mecca (1990)

Singles from One Thousand Years of Trouble
- 1. "Who's Afraid of the Big Bad Noise?" Released: May 1987; 2. "Don't Get Mad...Get Even!" Released: September 1987; 3. "Take It!" Released: January 1988

One Thousand Years of Trouble is the debut full-length album, and second album overall, by English electronic rock band Age of Chance, released in 1987 by Virgin Records. After attracting the attention of Virgin with their industrial cover version of Prince's "Kiss", the band signed to the label and began working on the album with producer Howard Gray, whose Sequential Circuits Studio 440 drum machine enticed the band. Gray was given free hand by Virgin on the album, which was recorded at Trident Studios. The album showcases the band's unique "crush collision" sound, incorporating sampling, noisy power chords, hard percussion, house beats, and influences from post-punk and hip hop. Lead singer Steve Elvidge's lyrics display a Northern, bitter tone, incorporating sloganeering and commenting on contemporary politics.

The influential packaging was one of the first major projects by Designer's Republic. One Thousand Years of Trouble was promoted by a live tour and the release of three singles, all of which had specially commissioned twelve-inch mixes, including a remix of "Take It!" by Public Enemy. The album itself received critical acclaim but saw little commercial success. However, the album's style has since been regarded as innovative and groundbreaking, anticipating commercially successful bands like Pop Will Eat Itself, Jesus Jones, Carter USM and EMF, who became popular several years after the album's release. The album's engineers Steve Osbourne and Mark "Spike" Stent also took influence from the recording sessions in later productions.

== Background ==
Age of Chance formed in Leeds in 1984. The band's first independent singles, "Motorcity" (1985) and "Bible of the Beats" (1986) were noisy post-punk songs incorporating sloganeering and snare drum snaps on each downbeat, reflecting the band's love for Glenn Branca, Sonic Youth and Motown soul. Both songs were successful in the UK Independent Singles Chart. The song "From Now On, This Will Be Your God" soon appeared on the influential jangle pop compilation C86, released with the NME in 1986. This was despite Age of Chance and other contributors like Big Flame and Stump being stylistically different to the album's characteristic indie pop sound. Age of Chance's subsequent releases saw the band meld their noise rock influences with samplers and hip hop, "music with an influence palpable across swathes of subsequent British pop." The band took further influence from disco and Prince and changed their attire to brightly coloured lycra clothes.

For the sole single from their mini-album Kiss Crush Collision (1986), which reached number 4 in the UK Independent Albums Chart, Age of Chance covered Prince's then-recent hit "Kiss", working out the music from hearing it in clubs and consulting Smash Hits for the lyrics, although changing them considerably. The cover features an industrial music style, described by bass player Geoff Taylor as "[removing] the sex and [replacing] it with lump hammers." Upon its release in November 1986, it reached number one on the UK Indie charts, and attracted the attention of Virgin Records, who signed the band with a £100,000 advance, which unusually saw the band deal directly with head of Virgin, as opposed to an A&R executive. Before signing to the British label, Age of Chance first signed with Virgin's American subsidiary. Once signed to both labels, Age of Chance began work on One Thousand Years of Trouble.

== Recording ==
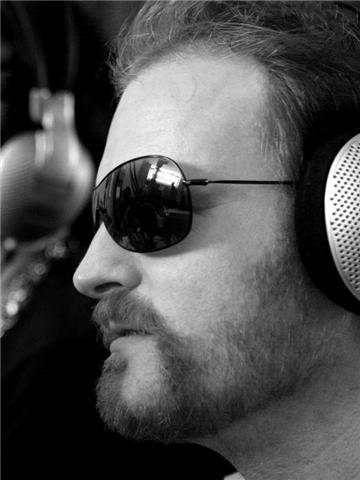
Howard Gray (pictured in 2010).

Age of Chance told Virgin they wanted to co-produce the album, a circumstance rarely granted to bands on major labels recording their debut album. The band interviewed potential co-producers at Virgin's headquarters, ultimately settling on Howard Gray, who they discovered carrying a copy of "Kiss" in a West End bar between interviews, and who informed the band he liked their material. As Gray was an established and successful producer who had worked with UB40 and Terence Trent D'Arby, he was considered an unusual choice to produce the album, but in addition to enjoying the band, he had purchased a Sequential Circuits Studio 440 drum machine sequencer to create music similar to the band's material. The producer's prior successes allowed him to be given free rein on the album by Virgin Records. His fascination with the Studio 440 machine later inspired the name of his electronic group Apollo 440.

Meanwhile, DJ Powercut (Noel Watson), an acquiantece of Gray's, joined the band as a DJ for the creation of the album and its subsequent tour. At the time, he was a London-based hip-hop DJ and host of the "Delerium at the Astoria" club night, and his reputation in the London's UK hip hop scene was strong enough that by 1987, he and his brother were mentioned by Derek B on his single "Get Down." With Watson in the line-up, Age of Chance became one of the earliest rock groups to feature a DJ as a member. He is credited in the album's liner notes as The Almighty Power-Cut.

Over a number of months, the band worked up the songs on the album in a Leeds rehearsal room. The versions of the songs played were relatively no-frills and bare compared to the final versions, and were described by Taylor as a "guitar/bass/samples kind of thing." Later on, Gray sat in on a session in order "to get the general vibe," and then he and the band set about recording demos of the songs in an expensive Leeds studio. Scrapped during these sessions was a work-in-progress between Taylor and Noel later described by the former as a stylistic fusion between the music of Sonic Youth and the Glitter Band with Tony Iommi-style guitar.

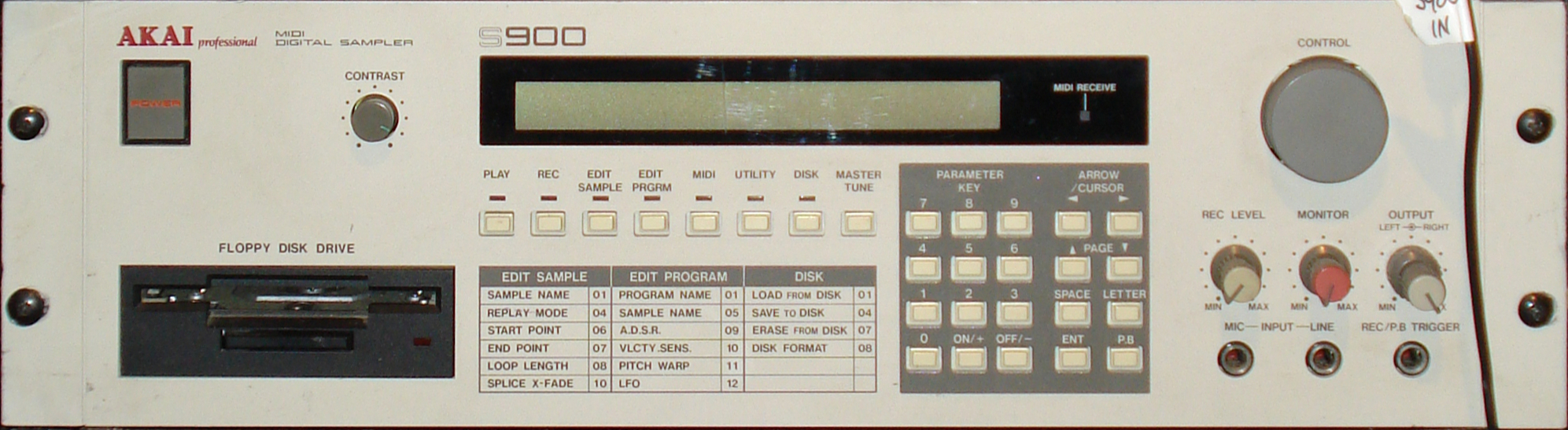
The band used three Akai S900 samplers on the album.

Gray and the band then moved to Trident Studios, London, a studio they felt was sufficient as it was the recording place of many iconic 1970s glam rock albums. They were joined by engineer Mark 'Spike' Stent and tape operator Steve Osbourne, and planned six weeks recording at Trident One and then another six weeks mixing the album at Trident Two. At the start of these sessions, they spent a decent amount of time experimenting with different sounds for each track, shaping the album's musical style. Having acquired three Akai S900 samplers, the band sampled television, films and sound libraries, as well as their own tracks. They had overrun their scheduled time at Trident One, so spent further time recording the album in Trident Two, which caused issues with budgeting.

== Composition ==
One Thousand Years of Trouble showcases the band's "crush collision" musical hybrid, combining crunchy but clipped guitar power chords, grumbling bass, blaring drumming, house beats, samples and even gospel choirs. Stewart Mason of AllMusic feels the album's sound is characterised by the prominence of the noisy guitars, pounding drum rhythms, wayward samples and loops and Elvidge's hoarse, shouted singing, which he felt recalls "the group's Leeds forebears the Mekons and Gang of Four," while Mark Emsley of The Quietus described the album as "35 minutes of samples, noise, guitars, northern grit and sarcasm." The record blends influences of earlier experiments with Motown sound-inspired beats, cut-and-paste sampling techniques, post-punk groups like The Fall, The Pop Group and The Fire Engines and fusions of hip hop and pop music.

Elvidge's lyrics on the album are harsh in their critique of the Margaret Thatcher–Ronald Reagan era and American militarism. Each song features lyrical exclamations and shouted slogans that have been compared to terrace chants; The Quietus felt the shouted slogans are "a style that seems political in itself" which help highlight the otherwise highly germane songs. "Don't Get Mad...Get Even!" reflects the influence of house music, featuring both beats and bass-lines in a New York house style. Gray's brother Trevor played keyboards on the song, taking influence from the house music played at nightclubs that Watson performed at. "Ready or Not Here We Come" features satirical lyrics concerning American military adventurism, while "Hold On" was pitched to several television networks as potential theme music for coverage of the 1987 general election.

"Who's Afraid of the Big Bad Noise?", a heavy, layered song containing raspy noise and hip hop loops, addresses what the group considered to be widely-held misconceptions about the band and their sound. It was described by Angus Batey of The Quietus as the song which likely best exemplifies "the mixture of inspiration, madness, intuition, confidence, technical achievement and musical daring that made the band so remarkable at the time." Emsley said of the song: "The sonic template was laid down. Discordant noise, drum machines clattering away, DJ scratches being provided by new addition to the ranks, Powercut (a.k.a. well established hip hop and later house DJ, Noel Watson), mob-friendly chants — all matched by Steven E ranting, 'Free your mind and your ass will follow'."

"Take It!" defends musicians who base material on samples, while also serving as a critique on consumerism, with a repeating sonic motif. The delicate sample hooks include a decaying power chord sampled from "Tommy Gun" by The Clash, lyrics from David Bowie's "Somebody Up There Likes Me" and a synthesiser sample taken from "Why Can't This Be Love?" by Van Halen. The spoken-word "take it" sample, often mistaken to be the voice of Ronald Reagan, was in fact a voice taken from Cashing Objections, a spoken word album containing a lecture on sales techniques that belonged to Elvidge's dad. "Learn to Pray" closes the album, wrapping up the album's politics, vitriol and sonic experimentation "in a churchified piece of electro-rock-gospel," with Elvidge's lyrics opining that placing faith in higher powers will not satisfy people that do not stay true to themselves.

== Packaging ==
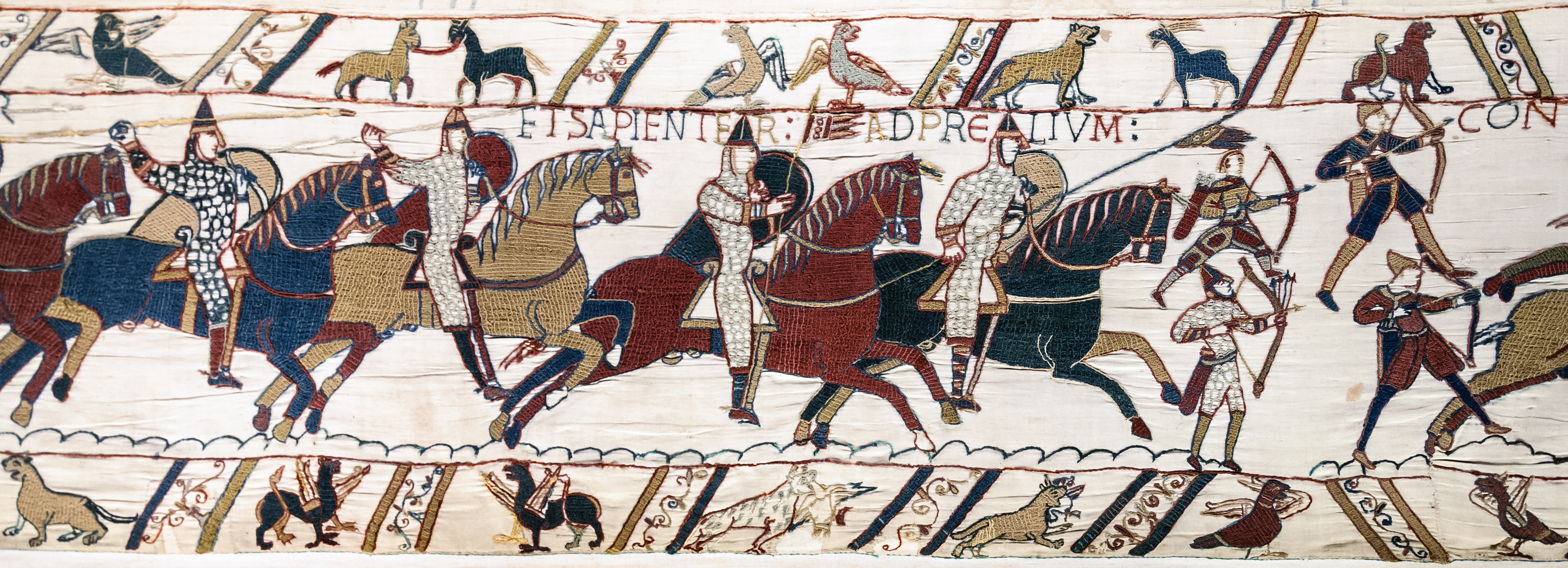
The inner sleeve, designed by Designer's Republic, includes a manipulation of the Bayeux Tapestry.

The album packaging was one of the first major projects designed by the Sheffield-based Designer's Republic, who had designed all the band's sleeves since "Kiss" and would go on to become an influential agency. Age of Chance asked Designer's Republic to assemble the packaging as they saw fit, and handed the design agency a copy of the go-go compilation album Go-Go Crankin' (1986) as an example of how they would like to have seen the final product. The final sleeve drew upon the band's disparate influences including Trouble Funk album sleeves and Russian constructivism.

The cardboard inner sleeve of the LP features numerous mass-media related images, including a manipulation of the Bayeux Tapestry and the large rendered text "Listen / Crush / The Mighty Roar of Consumption, Construction & Corruption / This is the Sound." The back cover features a blue background adorned with three red stars, two columns of red bombs and orange text. Like the album itself, the packaging turned out to be influential on several late 1980s bands including Pop Will Eat Itself. The Designers Republic's initial "first thought" sketch of the cover, drawn onto A4 paper, and the completed cardboard inner sleeve, are housed in the Victoria & Albert Museum collection.

== Singles and promotion ==
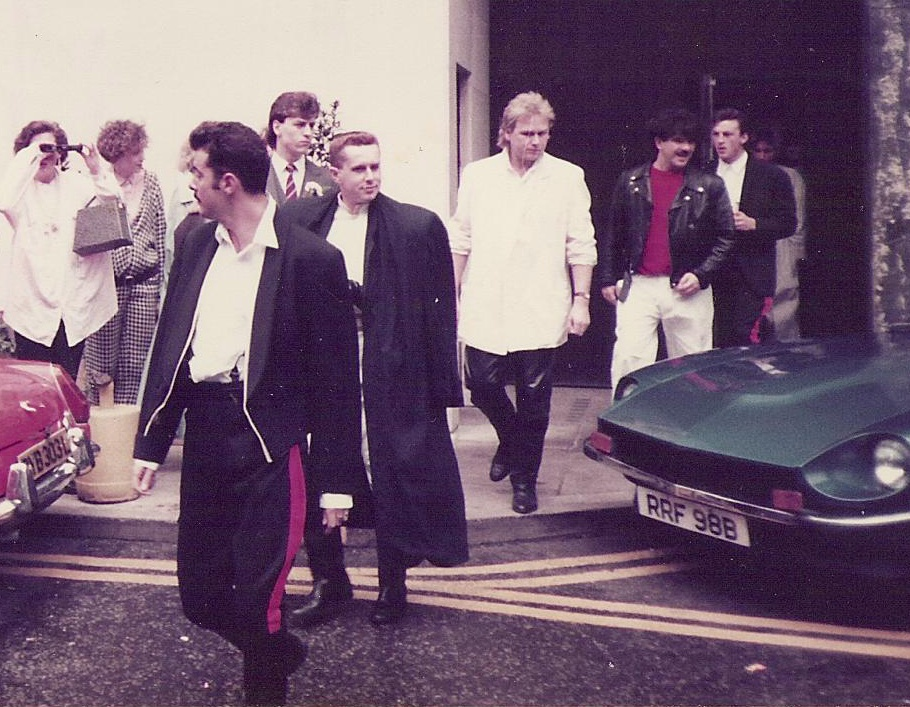
The 12" remixes of "Two Tribes" by Frankie Goes to Hollywood (pictured) inspired Age of Chance to release remix singles from the album.

In May 1987, "Who's Afraid of the Big Bad Noise?" was released as the album's first single by Virgin, who greeted the song with a positive reception. Taylor recalled: "At that point, Virgin were simply letting us get on with things, as you might expect with any new band on the label." NME later named it the 56th best single of 1987 in their year-end poll. "Don't Get Mad...Get Even!" and "Take It!" were released as further singles in September 1987 and January 1988 respectively, although none of the three singles charted on the UK Singles Chart.

The first two singles were also issued as two separate twelve-inch singles with different packaging and different remixes on the A-side. These releases were inspired by Frankie Goes to Hollywood's 1984 hit "Two Tribes", which had also been released as a series of twelve-inch singles containing different remixes. The "Dancepower" and "Let There Be... Sonic War Sculpture!" remixes of "Who's Afraid of the Big Bad Noise?" incorporate momentary samples of Parliament's "Flash Light" atop a time-stretched Led Zeppelin drum break. Public Enemy also contributed a remix of "Take It!", applying a skittering, muted hip hop production. Taylor later spoke of his love for the "Sonic War Sculpture!" mix, saying "there are some great little moments in there, Led Zeppelin fighting it out with Gary Glitter and Barry White…totally uncompromising. hard on the ears, but in the good sense!" He noted the engineer of the remix developed an ear problem and had to visit a Harley Street medical surgery.

Age of Chance toured throughout the United Kingdom in 1987. The tour officially ended at the Town and Country, London on 6 December 1987, with the exception of a later-scheduled charity event. The tour included a homecoming gig on 24 November 1987 at Leeds Polytechnic. As Elvidge left the band after the tour, the concerts marked the singer's final performances with the band.

== Release and reception ==
Professional ratings
Review scores
Source	Rating
AllMusic	4.5/5 stars
The Village Voice	B+

One Thousand Years of Trouble was released by Virgin Records in 1987. Although the album sold respectably relative to the band's career, it did not enter the UK Albums Chart, where it was eclipsed by strong sellers and largely failed to expand Age of Chance's audience and attract further attention towards the group. Batey felt that the album likely sold enough for a placing on the Indie Charts, where the band had built their following but were now ineligible due to their contract with Virgin, and as such the album fell below the radar.

Nonetheless, the album was released to critical acclaim. Writing in his "Consumer's Guide" column in The Village Voice, Robert Christgau gave the album a grade of B+, writing that, "[a]t their strongest these Leeds lads have the postsituationist aggro down," noting how "[s]logans like 'Take It!' and 'Don't Get Mad…Get Even!' are presented literally, yelled over loud funk beats that combined with their wall of noise makes them white rap the way Led Zep were white blues. Advocating insurrection ain't planning revolution, but it ain't surrender either." Scott Schnider of Trouser Press was more reserved, saying "One Thousand Years of Trouble benefits from being more gimmicky and over-the-top, with lots more sampling; even so, an album's worth of this stuff is pretty grating." Barry Young of Aberdeen Press and Journal felt the "dull" album was a fusion of Frankie Goes to Hollywood's "more doom-laden period" fused with "a scratch version of Dead or Alive."

Among retrospective reviews, Stewart Mason of AllMusic named the record an "Album Pick" and wrote: "Abrasive, noisy, yet vibrant and intriguing, One Thousand Years of Trouble deserved more attention than it got." Reflecting on the album's thirtieth anniversary, Angus Batey of The Quietus wrote that the record could likely only have been produced at its "precise moment in time" when house and hip hop were played together in club DJ sets, before the rise of the hip house fusion genre and the separation of audiences between the two genres. He wrote that the album still sounds "so durably excellent three decades later." Writing for The Guardian, he also called the album "a triumph." In 2005, The Word included the album in the second part of their "Hidden Treasure: Great Underrated Albums of Our Time" list, having been chosen for inclusion by broadcaster Andrew Collins.

== Legacy ==
Despite being commercially unsuccessful upon release, One Thousand Years of Trouble has been cited as a groundbreaking and influential album, anticipating the musical direction of several bands later on in the 1980s. Batey wrote that, "with the exception of Big Audio Dynamite, no-one else was doing anything in quite the same area in 1987," writing that Age of Chance "set a template others followed." Pop Will Eat Itself began using samples in their music, Carter USM became fans of the band and EMF and Jesus Jones had worldwide hits which fused guitar pop and sampling that "owed a significant debt to One Thousand Years and the other records it influenced," according to Batey. Pop Will Eat Itself, who Mason felt "photocopied" the sound of the album, even hired Designer's Republic to design their sleeves, with the album cover of This Is the Day...This Is the Hour...This Is This! (1989) directly influenced by the One Thousand Years sleeve. Mason reflected:

"Age of Chance was no more than 18 months ahead of its time -- two years, tops -- but that short gap was enough to doom the band commercially. If 1987's One Thousand Years of Trouble had been released in 1989, when groups like Pop Will Eat Itself and Carter USM were actively exploring the links between Iggy Pop and Public Enemy, it would have been hailed as groundbreaking. At the time, it merely sounded weird and alien, like Sigue Sigue Sputnik with fewer gimmicks and better musicianship."

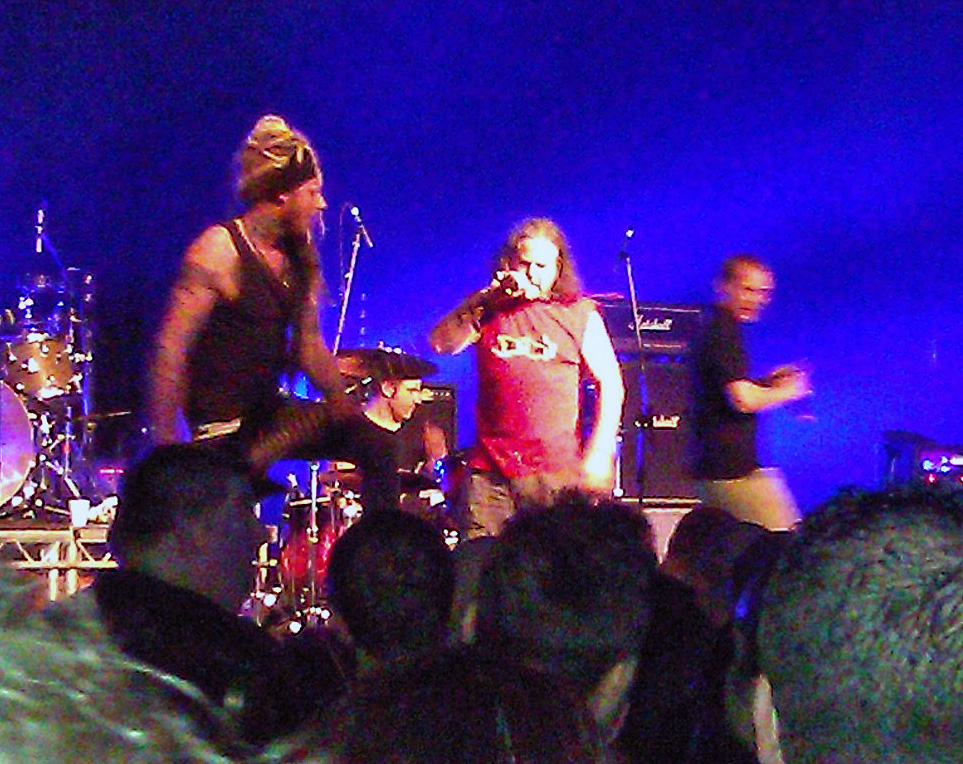
Bands including Pop Will Eat Itself (pictured) took influence from One Thousand Years of Trouble.

Taylor conceded that Age of Chance's sound was not readily accessible at the time, saying that Pop Will Eat Itself, and in particular EMF and Jesus Jones, "knew how to write a catchy, accessible 3 minute pop-song, in a way that we didn't. Plus, by the time those bands were in a position to get out there with those songs, the music-biz and the general public were more ready for it. The very idea of sampling for instance, of having someone else’s vocal/guitar/chorus whatever, in your own recording, was, by the turn of the 90’s or so, pretty well established."

Furthering the album's influence, Jimmy Jam and Terry Lewis lifted the sample loop used in "This is Crush Collision" – itself constructed from a sample from "Thank You (Falettinme Be Mice Elf Agin)" by Sly & the Family Stone – and used it in the production of Janet Jackson's 1989 hit "Rhythm Nation" instead of sampling the original Sly & the Family Stone track. Batey also writes that the album's engineers would "draw on the lessons learned in later life," noting how Mark "Spike" Stent would later work on "rock-rap-sample-pop collision/collage projects" including U2's Pop (1997) and Bjork's Vespertine (2001), while Steve Osborne would go on to co-produce Happy Mondays' "dance-rock breakthrough" album, Pills 'n' Thrills and Bellyaches (1990). One Thousand Years of Trouble is also regarded as one of the first rock albums to feature a DJ. In 1988, Channel 4 began using "Don't Get Mad...Get Even!" in their coverage of American football.

== Track listing ==
All songs written by Age of Chance

1. "We Got Trouble" – 3:44
2. "Don't Get Mad… Get Even!" – 3:27
3. "Ready or Not Here We Come" – 4:12
4. "Shut Up & Listen" – 2:56
5. "Hold On" – 2:36
6. "Who's Afraid of the Big Bad Noise?" – 2:51
7. "Take It!" – 4:40
8. "This Is Crush Collision" – 5:27
9. "Learn to Pray" – 6:04

== Personnel ==
- Steve Elvidge – vocals ("mob oberator"), songwriter
- Geoff Taylor – songwriter, bass ("all nite bass frequencies")
- Jan Perry – songwriter, percussion ("beat dominator")
- Neil Howson – songwriter
- The Almighty Power-Cut – scratches (cuts), percussion
- Howard Gray – programming
- Mike Prior – photography
- Designer's Republic – artwork
- John F. Power – spiritual guidance
- Crush Commander – special knowledge
- Steve Osbourne – engineer (assistant)
- Mark "Spike" Stent – engineer (chief)
- Lorenza Johnson – backing vocals (tracks 1, 2 and 9)
