= Gun Shy =

Gun Shy may refer to:

- Gunshy, a 1998 film starring William Petersen, Diane Lane, and Michael Wincott and directed by Jeff Celentano
- Gun Shy (2000 film), starring Sandra Bullock, Liam Neeson, and Oliver Platt
- Gun-Shy (2003 film), German crime drama film
- Gun Shy (2017 film), starring Antonio Banderas and Olga Kurylenko
- Gun Shy (TV series), a 1983 series based on The Apple Dumpling Gang

== Music ==
- "Gun Shy", a song by 10,000 Maniacs from their 1987 album In My Tribe
- "Gunshy", a song by Liz Phair from her 1993 album Exile in Guyville
- "Gun-Shy", a song by Grizzly Bear from their 2012 album Shields
- Gun-Shy (album), an album by The Screaming Blue Messiahs
- The Gun Shys, former name of the band The Shys
  - The Gun Shys EP, an EP by the same band
