= Josh Bray =

Josh Bray may refer to:

- Josh Bray (singer-songwriter)
- Josh Bray (politician)
