= The Screaming Blue Messiahs =

Rock band from 1980s London

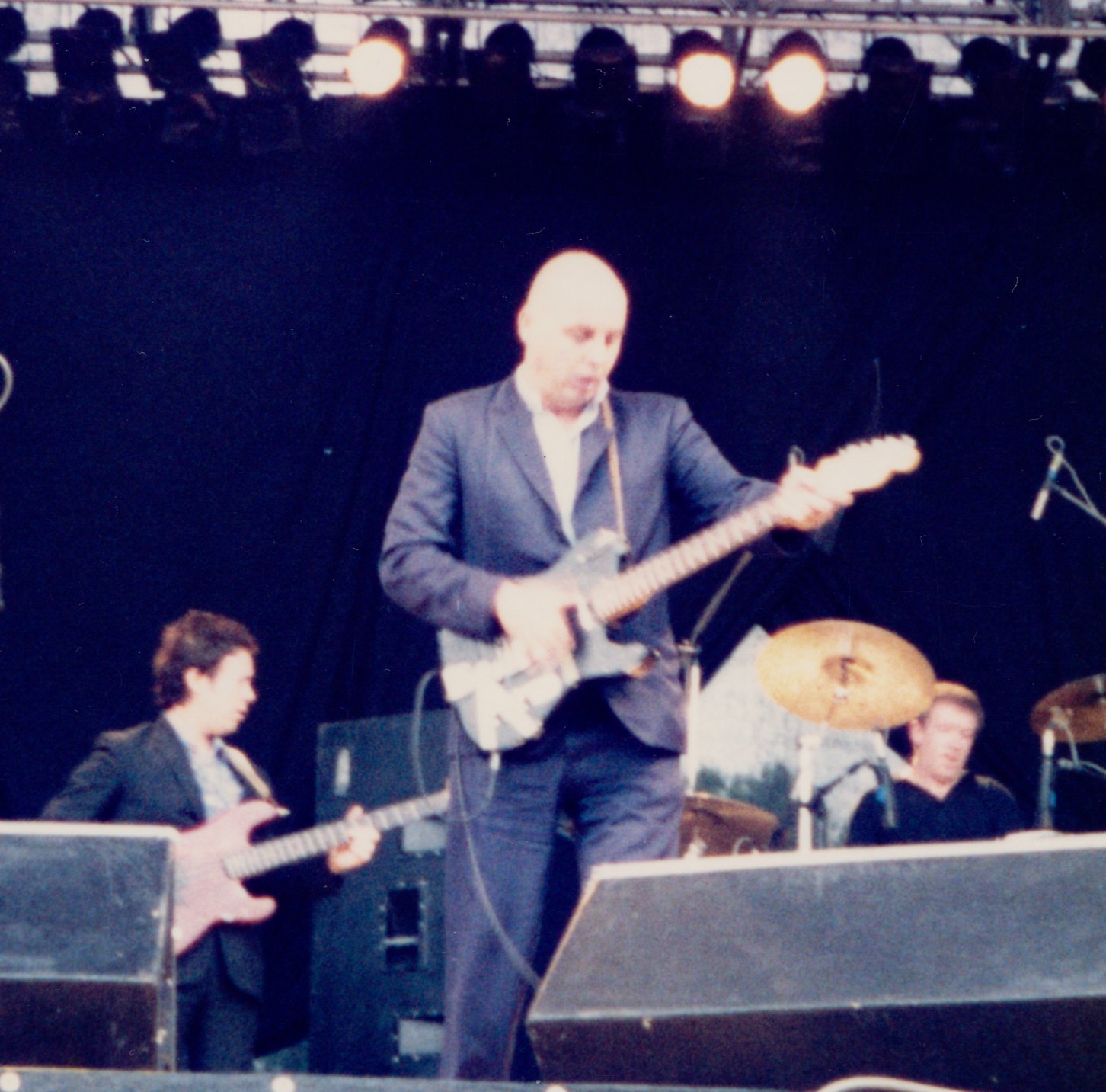
- The Screaming Blue Messiahs, circa 1987

Background information
- Origin: London, England
- Genres: Rock, punk rock, rhythm and blues, new wave, blues rock, rockabilly
- Years active: 1983–1990
- Labels: Big Beat, WEA, Elektra
- Members: Bill Carter; Chris Thompson; Kenny Harris

The Screaming Blue Messiahs were a rock band, formed in 1983 in London by guitarist and singer Bill Carter, bass player and backing singer Chris Thompson and drummer Kenny Harris. The group emerged in the wake of the pub rock and punk scenes that had been very prominent on the UK capital's live music circuit during the late '70s/ early '80s. The band, a classic power trio, was active between 1983 and 1990 and released three major label LPs. They toured extensively throughout Europe, North America and Australasia, garnering wide critical acclaim for their aggressive blend of rhythm and blues, punk and rockabilly.

== History ==
=== Early years ===
Before founding the Screaming Blue Messiahs, its three members had played together as The Small Brothers. Thompson and Carter had been part of the Captain Beefheart-influenced band Motor Boys Motor; together with Tony Moon on vocals, they recorded several tracks under that name on 24 August 1981 for John Peel's show on BBC Radio 1 and released a self-titled album. Initially, after Harris joined Carter and Thompson, the band briefly continued to perform under the name 'Motor Boys Motor'. According to Carter, the final name was chosen upon the suggestion of Ace/Big Beat's Ted Caroll, who was concerned that the band's initial proposal of 'The Blues Messiahs' sounded too pub rock.

Carter employed a rhythmic, blues-influenced, feedback-laden guitar style, using mainly Fender Telecaster guitars together with two combo amps: a Mesa Boogie and an HH outfitted with Gauss speakers. For his occasional forays into slide, he favoured 'the mike stand, or whatever is handy', and that he only used open tunings 'when the strings go open by accident'.

Featuring a sound described as "rockabilly from hell" and a strong passion for Americana, cars, guns, aeroplanes and broadcast evangelism, the group released the mini-album Good and Gone on Big Beat Records. Its six songs, which had been selected from eleven songs recorded in spring 1984 with producer Vic Maile during a session at Elephant Studios in Wapping, London, included a version of Hank Williams' "You're Gonna Change". Upon its release, the EP entered the top twenty in the UK independent record chart, where it remained for six months.

The Screaming Blue Messiahs played their first official gig at 'Downstairs at the Clarendon', Hammersmith, London on 11 June 1984. On 24 July 1984, they performed the songs "Good And Gone", "Someone To Talk To", "Tracking The Dog" and "Let's Go Down to the Woods And Pray" during their first recorded session for the John Peel show on BBC Radio 1. Broadcast on 2 August, the session proved so popular that it resulted in two BBC releases, one a 4-track 12" and a later inclusion of 'Good And Gone' on an album sampler of Peel Sessions. In December of the same year, The Screaming Blue Messiahs appeared on The Old Grey Whistle Test on the BBC, playing two songs: "Let's Go Down to the Woods And Pray" and "Good And Gone", and then undertook a short tour of the Netherlands.

=== Major label signing ===
In January 1985, the band signed to WEA. The label re-released the mini-album Good and Gone, and the band began work on Gun Shy, their first studio album, produced by Vic Maile. On 30 March 1985, BBC Radio broadcast a live gig at the Paris Theatre in London. On 14 June, the Messiahs played their second BBC session, performing live versions of "Good and Gone", "Tracking the Dog" and "Talking Doll" for Andy Kershaw's show. In addition, the band extensively toured the UK, Finland, Belgium, Sweden, the Netherlands and Germany that year. The track "Twin Cadillac Valentine", having been influenced from the Spencer Davis Group song "Strong Love", was released as the first single from Gun Shy in the autumn of 1985. Commenting on the song, Carter has said, "When we first went in the studio we didn't have anything, just the backing track. I was trying to get Kenny to play like on "I Can See For Miles". It's about girls...cars...love, attempted kidnapping and wide open spaces."

The release of Gun-Shy in early 1986 was met by a generally positive reception by select music press: Melody Maker stated, "[t]hey have a gut instinct for the roots of blues and R 'n' B and from that sure base they can confidently blast their way through Bill Carter's extraordinarily powerful selection of songs". The NME opined that, "[o]n the strength of this album, I'd say the Messiahs are going to be very, very big indeed." To promote the album, the band embarked on another extensive tour of Germany, Finland, UK, US—including a series of concerts supporting The Cramps—Australia and New Zealand. Two further singles, "Smash The Market Place" and "Wild Blue Yonder", were released from Gun-Shy in 1986. "Wild Blue Yonder" resurfaced in 2006 as the closing music of season 03, episode 04 of FX's Rescue Me.

Their second album, Bikini Red, was recorded over several months in studios around London and released in 1987. Produced by Maile, the record included songwriting contributions from Tony Moon. The first two singles released from the album were "I Can Speak American" and the title track.

The band returned to the BBC in November 1987 and recorded versions of "Sweet Water Pools", "I Wanna Be a Flintstone" and "Big Brother Muscle" from the Bikini Red LP for the Janice Long programme.

=== Critical acclaim ===
Jim Betteridge commented in International Musician magazine on Carter's playing style, saying that "[h]e plays without a pick, crashing the flesh of his fingers into the strings with little regard for its mortality. Blood can often be seen splattered across the scratch plate – or the place where the scratch plate would be if it hadn't been removed. To avoid completely razoring the top of his fingers off, and I suppose also because he likes the sound, William uses unusually heavy bottom strings; Rotosound (and nothing else will do) 56, 48, 28, 16, 13 and 12. But he gives 'em such a sound thrashing that one string breaks every couple of numbers and often one a number, and I don't just mean the top strings; Es and As cop it an' all. In the words of his roadie, 'He goes fooking bonkers!'"

Carter's vocal delivery also attracted attention in the music press with, for example, John Dougan commenting: "Carter wielded his instrument like a cross between Wilko Johnson and Pete Townshend; he was a deft soloist, but it was his tricky, complex rhythm playing that gave the band sheet-after-sheet of supercharged sound for a foundation. As impressive as his guitar playing was his voice: at times comically bawling, other times mumbling and imperceptible; in the course of a verse, Carter could sound righteously indignant, or suddenly frightened and confused". The band's overall sound, according to Dougan, "made for extreme, confrontational, and very, very exciting rock & roll".

On the edition of 20 March 1987 of the Channel 4 TV show The Tube, David Bowie announced that his favourite band of the moment was The Screaming Blue Messiahs. An avid fan of the group, Bowie reaffirmed his affection for the group on other occasions, for example, in the August '87 issue of Musician magazine: "Well! The band this week – I've only just discovered them, so they're my pet project – is The Screaming Blue Messiahs. They're the best band I've heard out of England in a long time", and when asked by Rolling Stone magazine in 1987 who his favourite band was, Bowie replied "The Screaming Blue Messiahs. I love them. I think they're terrific."; and again in Words & Music magazine in January 1988: "There’s an English band I like very much. Nobody seems to have heard of them. They’re called The Screaming Blue Messiahs and I’m pushing them like mad. I think they’re really good. There’s an element of The Clash in them that I really like. But there's something else there. I'm not really sure what it is. There's an exciting guitar player. He's a sort of new wave guitar player, but they're an angry mob from London." The admiration extended to an invitation for the Messiahs to join Bowie on a couple of his Glass Spider Tour dates in the UK. They supported at Cardiff Arms Park in Wales and Roker Park in Sunderland on the 21 and 23 June 1987.

=== Chart success ===
January 1988 saw the release of "I Wanna Be A Flintstone", a reworked song from the Motor Boys Motor album, as a single. The record became a hit, peaking at number 28 in the UK Singles Chart. The song's success saw the band appearing on the BBC's Top of the Pops and Saturday morning kids' show No. 73. Two videos were made for the song, both making use of cartoon clips from the Flintstones TV series. The single appeared in multiple formats, including picture discs and extended 12" remix versions. The song became the group's only charting song in Australia, where it peaked at number 100 in April 1988.

Coinciding with their increased popularity due to "I Wanna Be A Flintstone", the band again toured extensively. In February 1988, the group played concerts in the UK, France, Belgium and Germany. In March they returned to the US for an extended tour, supporting Echo & The Bunnymen. In April they toured further throughout the US, and late in the year visited Finland and played a few gigs in their native Britain. Commenting on the characteristic intensity of the band's stage performance at this time, Jon Pareles stated that "although most rockers like to think their music carries a sense of danger, few bands come closer to raw mayhem than the Screaming Blue Messiahs."

Despite having achieved critical acclaim and a hit record, a change of manager and a long touring schedule coupled with financial hardships after returning from tours began to take a toll on the band. To cope with the intensity of the band's live performances, Carter explained that "I used to have to prepare myself all day ahead of the gig for the sheer emotional and physical onslaught. I used to put everything into the gigs. I'd come off stage all used up. I was so hot after, I would have to put ice on my head! Then we'd come back from touring and I'd have to sell guitars in order to live". This sentiment was shared by Thompson, "One minute I'd be signing autographs in Hollywood then I'd be back here painting skirting boards".

=== Final album ===
Their third album, Totally Religious — jointly produced by Howard Gray and Robert Stevens — was recorded in Miami Sound Studios and Criteria Studios in Miami, Alaska Studios in Waterloo, London and Sheffield Recording in Phoenix, Maryland and released in 1989. To support the album's release, the Messiahs toured the UK in November, and in December played six concerts in Germany. A promo video for the track "Four Engines Burning" was shot, although no singles were released from the album. The group's relationship with its record label deteriorated, resulting in the removal of Totally Religious from distribution a month after its release. The band was dropped from its contract, and split up shortly afterwards, playing their last gig at The Subterrania Club in Notting Hill, London, on 5 June 1990.

The group's recordings were subsequently deleted from the WEA and Elektra catalogues and became unavailable.

== Post break-up ==
Following the split, Thompson and Harris played with Cajun outfit La Rue. They then reunited with Tony Moon and bass player Ricky McGuire from The Men They Couldn't Hang to form Dynamo Hum and released a 10" EP entitled "Four Cute Creatures".

Kenny Harris went on to play with The Men They Couldn't Hang, followed by spells as a house husband, a baker and a published author.

In 1990, The Replacements released their album All Shook Down. Unbeknownst to them, the Messiahs had released a single with the same title two years earlier. Upon learning this, Replacements frontman Paul Westerberg tried unsuccessfully to delay the release of the record to change the title.

In 1994, "I Wanna Be A Flintstone" was included on the soundtrack to the US version of the film The Flintstones. In 1997 Dave 'Chalkie' Dawson, friend and photographer of the band in their early days, put together an official Screaming Blue Messiahs website at www.screamingbluemessiahs.co.uk

As of 2010, Bill Carter also returned to art, producing screen prints and digital work, exhibiting at the Jenny Granger Gallery and Kessaris Art.

The only new official Messiahs material to surface since 1989 has been the 1992 BBC Radio 1 Live in Concert CD, recorded at The Town & Country Club in London on 27 February 1988, and a home-produced live album of a show in Zurich, released in 2007. In 2009, Hux Records released an album titled The Screaming Blue Messiahs – Live at the BBC featuring live recordings of the band performing at the Paris Theatre in London in 1985 and BBC radio sessions recorded for the Andy Kershaw and Janice Long radio programmes in 1985 and 1987, respectively.

In 2009, Wounded Bird Records reissued the albums Gun Shy and Bikini Red, which had been unavailable since the early 1990s.

In April 2009, Chris Thompson gave an interview with Chicago-based music website Consequence of Sound during which, when asked about the possibility of The Screaming Blue Messiahs reforming, he commented: "Every couple of years I get a call from one of the others saying, "Shall we re-form and do something". I have always said, "OK let's go!" Then after about a week it fizzles out with some sort of drama. I had my bi-annual call recently. This time I said I wasn't up for it as it's just going to fizzle out in a week. Anyway, I'm having a lot of fun doing what I'm doing. But as they say, "Never say Never"."

In July 2010, Thompson's band The Killer B's released an album titled Love is a Cadillac, Death is a Ford on Track Records. It also featured former Messiahs drummer Kenny Harris and former collaborator Tony Moon.

In November 2012, Chris Thompson and Kenny Harris recorded three tracks with Pat Collier at Perry Vale Studios, London, under the name of Horseface, with plans for further recording and gigs in 2013. The three tracks were made available for listening on SoundCloud.

In May 2017, Greg Gutfeld of Fox News interviewed Bill Carter for his Podcast "The One w/ Greg Gutfeld". Billed as "his first interview since the band broke up in 1989"

In August 2022, Bill Carter released 3 singles together with Sarah Corina.

== Discography ==
=== Albums ===
- Good and Gone (1984, Big Beat Records) mini-album
- Gun-Shy (1986) – UK No. 90
- Bikini Red (1987)
- Totally Religious (1989)

=== Singles ===
- "Twin Cadillac Valentine" (1985)
- "Smash the Market Place" (1986)
- "Wild Blue Yonder" (1986)
- "Bikini Red" (1987)
- "I Can Speak American" (1987)
- "I Wanna Be a Flintstone" (1988) – UK No. 28, AUS No. 100

=== Live releases ===
- The Peel Sessions: The Screaming Blue Messiahs (Strange Fruit Records, SFPS003, 1986)
- BBC Radio 1 Live in Concert (Windsong International Records, WINCD022, 1992)
- Zurich 1989 (2007)
- The Screaming Blue Messiahs – Live at the BBC (Hux Records, 2009)

=== Box-sets ===
- Vision in Blues (Easy Action Records, 2016)

=== Compilation appearances ===
- Don't Let the Hope Close Down (features "Tracking the Dog" from "Good and Gone") (Hope Springs Records, HOPE 1, 1984)
- Beach Party Big Beat Compilation (features "Tracking the Dog" from "Good and Gone") (Big Beat, WIKM 39, 1985)
- The Peel Sessions Sampler (1988)
