= Gun-Shy (album) =

Studio album by the Screaming Blue Messiahs
- Released: 1986
- Genre: Rock
- Length: 41:57
- Label: Elektra
- Producer: Howard Gray, Vic Maile

The Screaming Blue Messiahs chronology
Good and Gone (1984)	Gun-Shy (1986)	Bikini Red (1987)

Professional ratings
Review scores
Source	Rating
Allmusic	3.5/5 stars

Gun-Shy is the second release by the Screaming Blue Messiahs and their first full-length recording. The album, which was jointly produced by Apollo 440's Howard Gray, was notable for being one of the last recordings by Vic Maile, well known for his work with Jimi Hendrix, Led Zeppelin and Eric Clapton. Gun-Shy was also one of two albums by The Screaming Blue Messiahs that brought them to the attention of David Bowie and that led to him promoting the band: "Well! The band this week – I've only just discovered them, so they're my pet project – is The Screaming Blue Messiahs. They're the best band I've heard out of England in a long time" and "There’s an English band I like very much. Nobody seems to have heard of them. They’re called The Screaming Blue Messiahs and I’m pushing them like mad."

== Reception ==
The release of Gun-Shy in early 1986 was met by a generally positive reception by select music press: Spin said, "Gun-Shy is a damn fine record, consisting of a quasi-neo-rockabilly power trio... the Screaming Blue Messiahs squeeze a lot of great music out of guitar, bass, drums and vocal."; The Melody Maker stated that "[t]hey have a gut instinct for the roots of blues and R 'n' B and from that sure base they can confidently blast their way through Bill Carter's extraordinarily powerful selection of songs." The NME wrote that "[o]n the strength of this album, I'd say the Messiahs are going to be very, very big indeed." To promote the album, the band embarked on another extensive tour of Germany, Finland, UK, Australia, New Zealand, and the USA — including a series of concerts supporting the Cramps and another series supporting Echo and the Bunnymen.

== Singles ==
"Smash the Market Place" and "Wild Blue Yonder" were released as singles in 1986. "Wild Blue Yonder" resurfaced in 2006 as the closing music of season 03/episode 04 of FX's Rescue Me.

== Track listing ==
Side one
No.	Title	Writer	Length
1.	"Wild Blue Yonder"	Bill Carter	4:44
2.	"Holiday Head"	Bill Carter	3:58
3.	"Smash The Market Place"	Bill Carter	3:10
4.	"You're Gonna Change"	Hank Williams	2:41
5.	"Just For Fun"	Bill Carter	2:49
6.	"Let's Go Down To The Woods"	Bill Carter	4:34

Side two
No.	Title	Writer(s)	Length
1.	"Talking Doll"	Bill Carter	2:38
2.	"Twin Cadillac Valentine"	Bill Carter	3:57
3.	"President Kennedy's Mile"	Bill Carter	2:56
4.	"Someone To Talk To"	Bill Carter/Christopher Thompson	3:36
5.	"Clear View"	Bill Carter	4:00
6.	"Killer Born Man"	Bill Carter	3:32

== Personnel ==
=== The band ===
- Bill Carter - Lead vocals and lead guitar
- Chris Thompson - Bass guitar and backing vocal
- Kenny Harris - Drums

=== Studio ===
- Creative Director – Hale Milgrim
- Design – Carol Bobolts
- Engineer (Additional) – Ernie Wilkens
- Management – John Dummer
- Mastered by Howie Weinberg
- Mixed by Chris Lord-Alge (tracks: 1 to 3, 5 to 9, 11, 12)
- Photography by Mel Yates
- Producer – Howard Gray (tracks: 1, 6 to 8, 12), Vic Maile (tracks: 2 to 5, 9 to 11)
