= Cherubs (UK band) =

Rock band

- Origin: London, England, UK
- Genres: Art rock, new wave, indie rock
- Years active: 2003–2007
- Label: Cargo Records / VMA / Voices of Wonder
- Past members: Staale Krantz Bruland – Vocals; Espen Dahl – Guitar / vocals; Matthew Orchard – Guitar; Jørgen Raa – Bass; Glenn Fryatt – Drums; Glenn Wange – Drums and percussion

Cherubs were a five-piece rock band from the United Kingdom and Norway. The band comprised Staale Krantz Bruland, Espen Dahl, Matthew Orchard, Jørgen Raa and Glenn Wange. The band formed in 2003, and disbanded in September 2007.

== History ==
The band came together in December 2003, and in a short period gigged and toured all over the UK and abroad with bands such as The Libertines, Bloc Party, The Cribs, The Rakes, Razorlight, Maxïmo Park, The Departure, Moving Units, The Others, Art Brut and many more.

Debut single "Hey Bunny" was out in October 2004, and their second single was the non-album track "Club Hoola Hoop's Walls", released in February 2005. Their debut album Uncovered by Heartbeat was released on 18 April 2005 on Cargo Records. The album was produced by Howard Gray and engineered by Ashley Krajewski at Apollo Control Studios. The band played an album release show to a capacity crowd at the Camden Barfly on 23 April 2005.

The single "A Man of No Importance" is another non-album track, and was out 15 August on CD single and ltd. edition 7". It was produced by Mercury Prize nominee producer Gareth Parton (Ikara Colt, The Go! Team, The Killers, The Futureheads, Shellac, The Breeders, Foals).

In the summer of 2005 the band played at the Wireless Festival, T in the Park, and at the Reading and Leeds Festivals.

In the Autumn 2005, Glenn Wange informed the band he intended to leave at the end of the year to continue his studies, and he played his last gig with the band 24 November at the Barfly in London. In February 2006, Glenn Fryatt joined as the new drummer.

Cherubs' record label was the London-based Cargo Records.

The band broke up in September 2007.

== Discography ==
=== Albums ===
- Uncovered by Heartbeat (April 2005)

=== Singles ===
- "Hey Bunny" (October 2004)
- "Club Hoola Hoop's Walls" (a.k.a. "I Go to Whom I'm Dressed For") (February 2005)
- "A Man of No Importance" (August 2005)
- "Paper Cut Moon" (February 2006)

=== Other appearances ===
- Jørgen Raa joined the band XX Teens post Cherubs.
- Espen Dahl appears on The Sailor Sessions recordings by The Libertines (2005), and joined the band Stricken City post Cherubs.
- Glenn Fryatt played drums and recorded for Ten Benson post Cherubs before joining London based 1960s surf group Oh! Gun Quit in 2010. Fryatt went on to play with Roman Remains, featuring Liela Moss and Toby Butler of The Duke Spirit, and is currently the drummer for the critically acclaimed, two-piece rock group The Diamond Lights, LA-based Happy Hollows, and Chief White Lightning
- Matthew Orchard formed The Bela Lugosi Blues post Cherubs (2008–2010), joined garage punk band Thee Cuss Words (2010–11) and currently plays guitar in These Guilty Men.
- Staale Krantz Bruland has had lyrics/vocals in the project Moist Tiger, and is currently (2019) the leadsinger in both the Norwegian garage rock hybrid The Hiveminds and in the electro-cool soloproject Brusk. He has also his own microstudiolabel "XU Records" together with his wife.
