= Bikini Red =

Studio album by the Screaming Blue Messiahs
- Released: 1987
- Genre: Rock
- Length: 34:50
- Label: Elektra
- Producer: Vic Maile

The Screaming Blue Messiahs chronology
Gun Shy (1986)	Bikini Red (1987)	Totally Religious (1989)

Bikini Red is the third release by the Screaming Blue Messiahs and the follow-up to Gun-Shy. The album, which was notable for being one of the last recordings by renowned producer Vic Maile, well known for his work with Jimi Hendrix, Led Zeppelin and Eric Clapton. Bikini Red was also one of two albums by The Screaming Blue Messiahs (along with Gun-Shy) that brought them to the attention of David Bowie and that led to him promoting the band: "Well! The band this week – I've only just discovered them, so they're my pet project – is The Screaming Blue Messiahs. They're the best band I've heard out of England in a long time" (Musician magazine, August 1987) and "There’s an English band I like very much. Nobody seems to have heard of them. They’re called The Screaming Blue Messiahs and I’m pushing them like mad." (Words And Music magazine, January 1988), and when asked by Rolling Stone magazine in 1987 who is favorite band were, Bowie replied, "The Screaming Blue Messiahs. I love them. I think they're terrific."

== Reviews ==
Professional ratings
Review scores
Source	Rating
AllMusic	4/5 stars
New Musical Express	6/10

AllMusic's John Duggan wrote: "The Messiahs' follow-up to Gun-Shy was this devastating hunk of noise, which didn't pull any punches when it came to raw emotion and intensity. Side One, especially, is a rave-up from the gut-bustin' raunch of 'Sweet Water Pools' to the closer 'Big Brother Muscle.' As always, Carter's obsessions are a little hard to understand, but the images and lyric fragments fly at you like shards of broken glass; you'll remember when they hit you. 'I Wanna Be a Flintstone' kicks off Side Two, and it remains as funky and funny as it was the first time you hear it. Great production work by Vic Maile."

== Singles ==
"Bikini Red" and "I Can Speak American" were both released as singles in 1987. January 1988 saw the release of "I Wanna Be A Flintstone" (a reworked song from an album by an earlier band of Carter's, Motor Boys Motor) as a single. The record became an instant hit, peaking at number 28 in the UK charts. The song's success saw the band appearing on the BBC's Top of the Pops and Saturday morning kids' show No. 73. Two videos were made for the song, both making use of cartoon clips from the Flintstones TV series. The single appeared in multiple formats, including picture discs and extended 12" remix versions.

== Track listing ==
Side one
No.	Title	Lead vocals	Length
1.	"Sweet Water Pools"	Bill Carter	3:32
2.	"Bikini Red"	Bill Carter	3:47
3.	"Too Much Love"	Bill Carter	3:07
4.	"I Can Speak American"	Bill Carter	2:57
5.	"Big Brother Muscle"	Bill Carter	2:59

Side two
No.	Title	Lead vocals	Length
1.	"I Wanna Be a Flintstone"	Bill Carter	2:31
2.	"Jesus Chrysler Drives a Dodge"	Bill Carter	4:01
3.	"Lie Detector"	Bill Carter	3:59
4.	"55-The Law"	Bill Carter	2:10
5.	"All Shook Down"	Bill Carter	2:16
6.	"Waltz"	Bill Carter	3:31

== Personnel ==
The band

- Bill Carter - Lead vocals and lead guitar
- Chris Thompson - Bass guitar and backing vocal
- Kenny Harris - Drums

Studio

- Engineer – Harold Burgon
- Engineer – Ian Caple
- Producer – Vic Maile
- Written by Bill Carter, except "Bikini Red", "Big Brother Muscle", "I Wanna Be a Flintstone", "Lie Detector", "55 - The Law" and "All Shook Down" by Bill Carter/Tony Moon
