= Totally Religious =

Studio album by the Screaming Blue Messiahs
- Released: 1989
- Length: 38:29
- Label: Elektra
- Producer: Howard Gray, Rob Stevens

The Screaming Blue Messiahs chronology
Bikini Red (1987)	Totally Religious (1989)	Live in Concert (1992)

Totally Religious is an album by the English band the Screaming Blue Messiahs, released in 1989. It was co-produced by previous Screaming Blue Messiahs producer Howard Gray and Rob Stevens.

== Reviews ==
Professional ratings
Review scores
Source	Rating
Chicago Tribune	3.5/4 stars
Orlando Sentinel	3/5 stars

The Chicago Tribune noted that, "with just guitar, bass and drums, the Messiahs play '50s blues/rockabilly with the fervor of a punk band." The Gazette determined that the album "packs enough bad attitude to disintegrate a hair salon full of metalheads." The New York Times opined that, "in Mr. [Bill] Carter's songs, speed and violence are the only alternatives to self-deception and despair—a brutal world view, but one that makes for savage, vital rock-and-roll."

The album has a 3/5 star rating on AllMusic. John Duggan wrote: "The final chunk of squalling guitar rant from the Screaming Blue Messiahs doesn't reach the relentless highs of Bikini Red, but it's pure mania nonetheless, and a sure shot for those who lapped up the first two waxings. The titles alone ('All Gassed Up' and 'Four Engines Burning [Over the USA]') clue you in that this is no mellow fest."

== Track listing ==
Side one
No.	Title	Lead vocals	Length
1.	"Four Engines Burning (Over the USA)"	Bill Carter	4:07
2.	"Mega City 1"	Bill Carter	4:15
3.	"Wall of Shame"	Bill Carter	4:19
4.	"Nitro"	Bill Carter	3:24
5.	"Big Big Sky"	Bill Carter	5:17

Side two
No.	Title	Lead vocals	Length
1.	"Watusi Wedding"	Bill Carter	2:47
2.	"Here Comes Lucky"	Bill Carter	4:40
3.	"Gunfight"	Bill Carter	3:08
4.	"Martian"	Bill Carter	3:27
5.	"All Gassed Up"	Bill Carter	3:05

== Personnel ==
The Screaming Blue Messiahs

- Bill Carter – lead vocals, lead guitar
- Chris Thompson – bass guitar, backing vocals
- Kenny Harris – drums

Technical

- Producer – Howard Gray
- Producer – Rob Stevens
