= Bisley (card game) =

Solitaire card game

- A Patience game
- Type: Open packer
- Family: Bisley
- Deck: Single 52-card
- Playing time: 5 min
- Odds of winning: 2 in 3

Bisley is a patience or card solitaire which uses a deck of 52 playing cards, and while difficult, it often can be completed successfully. It is closely related to Baker's Dozen, but the foundations are built upwards from Ace and downwards from King simultaneously. It is one of the few one-deck games in which the player has options on which foundation a card can be placed.

== Rules ==
First the four aces are taken out and laid on the tableau to start the foundations. Then four columns of three cards are placed overlapping each other separately under the aces. After that, nine columns of four cards, also overlapping each other, are dealt to the right of the aces and first four columns.

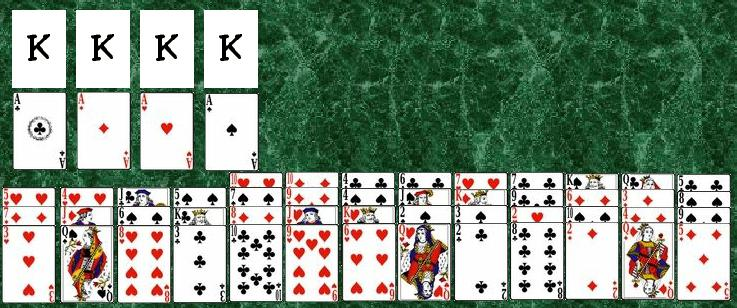
The initial layout of the game of Bisley. This follows the overlapping-cards rule set rather than the laying-out-the-cards rule set.

Here is the method of game play:

- Only the bottom, exposed cards in each column are available for play.
- Only one card can be moved at a time.
- The cards on the tableau can be built either up or down by suit.
- Whenever a column becomes empty, it stays empty for the rest of the game.
- The foundations (the four aces) are built up by suit. However, whenever a King is released and becomes available, it becomes a foundation and is placed above its counterpart ace foundation to be built down, also by suit. The same thing can be done for the three other kings. This rule also gives the player an opportunity to place a card on one of the foundations of the same suit if it can be placed on either of them.

The game is out when all cards end up in the foundations. It actually does not matter where the ace and king foundations of each suit would meet and how many cards the ace and king foundations of each suit will have. At the end of one game for example, the K♠ is the only one on its foundation while the rest of spade cards are built on the A♠; the A♣ remains unbuilt because all club cards are built on the K♣; the A♥ is built up to 4♥ while the K♥ is built down to 5♥; and the A♦ is built up to 8♦ while the K♦ is built down to 9♦. In fact, the ace and king foundation of a suit can meet anywhere.

== See also ==
- Baker's Dozen
- List of patiences and solitaires
- Glossary of patience and solitaire terms
