= Glory of Love (The Armoury Show song) =

1985 song by the Armoury Show

Single by the Armoury Show

from the album Waiting for the Floods
- B-side: "Higher Than the Instrumental"
- Released: June 1985
- Length: 4:52
- Label: Parlophone
- Songwriter(s): The Armoury Show
- Producer(s): Nick Launay

The Armoury Show singles chronology
"We Can Be Brave Again" (1985)	"Glory of Love" (1985)	"Castles in Spain" (1985)

"Glory of Love" is a song by British new wave band the Armoury Show, released by Parlophone in June 1985 as the third single from the band's debut studio album, Waiting for the Floods. The song was written by the Armoury Show and was produced by Nick Launay. "Glory of Love" peaked at number 92 in the UK Singles Chart.

== Critical reception ==
Upon its release, Jerry Smith of Music Week praised "Glory of Love" as "another glorious anthem", with Jobson's "dramatic vocals illustrated well" by McGeoch's "shards of echoing guitar". He continued, "For some unknown reason they have yet to receive commercial success but it can't be far off." Debbi Voller of Number One praised the band as a "powerful team, so heaven only knows why [they] aren't having massive hits". She felt the studio version of the song "doesn't quite match up to their live version" and considered it "a case of the wrong producer for the right song".

Eleanor Levy of Record Mirror noted Jobson's progression as a singer as he's now "half singing on this record, although he does deliver a good few heathen chants for old times". She concluded, "Not as good as it should be, but they're getting there". John Lee of the Huddersfield Daily Examiner praised Jobson's voice for "sound[ing] as good as ever", but was disappointed in the single, concluding, "Try again, chaps."

== Track listing ==
7–inch single (UK)

1. "Glory of Love" – 4:52
2. "Higher Than the Instrumental" – 4:14

12-inch single (UK)

1. "Glory of Love" (Universal Mix) – 8:25
2. "Glory of Love" – 4:52
3. "Higher Than the Instrumental" – 4:14

== Personnel ==
The Armoury Show ("Glory of Love")

- Richard Jobson – lead vocals, harmonies, backing vocals
- John McGeoch – lead guitar, rhythm guitar, piano
- Russell Webb – fretless bass, harmonies, backing vocals, keyboard arrangement
- John Doyle – drums, cymbals

Additional musicians

- Paul Fishman – keyboards, programming ("Glory of Love")
- Nick Launay – last bass note ("Glory of Love")

Production

- Nick Launay – production, recording, engineering and mixing
- The Armoury Show – arrangement
- The Universe – mixing ("Universal Mix" of "Glory of Love")

Other

- John McGeoch – mosaic
- Steve Percival – photography
- T+CP London – design

== Charts ==
Chart (1985)	Peak position
UK Singles (OCC)	92
