= Age of Chance =

British alternative rock/dance band

- Origin: Leeds, West Yorkshire, England
- Genres: Alternative rock, electronic dance
- Years active: 1983–1991
- Labels: Riot Bible, FON, Virgin
- Past members: Steven Elvidge; Geoff Taylor; Neil Howson; Jan Perry; Noel "DJ Powercut" Watson; Charles Hutchinson

Age of Chance were a British alternative rock-dance crossover band from Leeds, England, active from 1983 to 1991. They were perhaps most known for their mutant metallic cover of Prince's "Kiss" which topped the UK Indie Chart in 1986, and peaked at No. 50 on the UK Singles Chart in January the following year. Despite signing for major label Virgin, and being favourites with the UK music press, they never enjoyed a major hit in the UK, although "Don't Get Mad… Get Even" reached No. 8 on the U.S. Billboard Hot Dance/Club Play chart.

Musically they were a mixture of punk, hip hop, industrial rock and Northern soul. Steven E provided a distinctive strident nasal vocal style, often employing a megaphone. Striking cover art visuals were a collaboration between the group and The Designers Republic, who would go on to graphic design fame. They were the first band to be remixed by Public Enemy - a.k.a. Hank Shocklee and Carl Ryder, who remixed "Take It" from 1000 Years of Trouble (1988). They were contemporaries of Pop Will Eat Itself, whose music also featured rock guitar, dance beats and copious samples, and other early UK samplist groups such as Coldcut and the JAMMs.

== History ==
Steve Elvidge was a Leeds native, and attended St Michael's College (R.C.); being the most notable musical alumnus of that school since Jake Thackray. Neil Howson (guitar), also from Leeds, studied at Jacob Kramer College of Art, Geoff Taylor (Liverpool) and Jan Perry (Stockport) were students at Leeds Polytechnic, now Leeds Beckett University.

Age of Chance first came to national attention in 1985, when their debut single, "Motorcity/ Everlasting Yeah" released on their own label, Riot Bible, was picked up and championed by BBC Radio 1 DJ, John Peel. A session followed, recorded at Maida Vale Studios and four songs, "Going, Going Gone Man", "Mob Hut", "The Morning After the Sixties" and "I Don't Know and I Don't Care" were recorded. "I Don't Know.." was re-recorded for Gunfire and Pianos, a compilation album released by Zigzag magazine.

They released their second self-funded single, "Bible of the Beats" / "Liquid Jungle" in January 1986, which led to an invitation to contribute a track, "From Now On, This Will Be Your God" on the NME C86 compilation tape. The band made their London debut at the ICA Rock week in July 1986. A second Peel session was recorded in June 1986, with "Be Fast, Be Clean, Be Cheap", "From Now On, This Will be Your God", "Kiss" and "How the West Was Won". "Kiss" was recorded for the John Peel session while the Prince single was still in the charts.

These troublemakers top their agitpop with covers of "Disco Inferno" ... and "Kiss" ... Their "sonic metal disco" aims to reintroduce the Human League to the Gang of Four...

— Christgau's Record Guide: The '80s (1990)

The band then signed to the Sheffield independent record label, Fon, for "Kiss" and its remix 12-inches and six track mini-LP Crush Collision. "Kiss" was No. 2 in John Peel's Festive Fifty for 1986.

The band signed to Virgin in January 1987, and embarked on a nationwide UK tour. They recorded a Janice Long session comprising "Who's Afraid of the Big Bad Noise", "Hold On" and "Bible of the Motorcity Beats". They began recording their first single for Virgin with producer Howard Gray: "Who's Afraid of the Big Bad Noise/Big Bad Rap" and then started their first Virgin album, One Thousand Years of Trouble. A second single, "Don't Get Mad, Get Even" was released in October, followed by the album. In 1988, Channel 4 began using "Don't Get Mad..." as the music for the American Football programme, which ran over the next three years. The band began recording their second Virgin album in the summer at Rockfield in Wales.

Original singer Steven-E left in September 1988, during the recording of their second LP, forcing the rest of the band to recruit a new singer, Charles Hutchinson, in January 1989, and "re-vocal" the LP, which was released as Mecca in 1990. The main single from that collection, "Higher Than Heaven" reached No. 53 in the UK, despite being voted "record of the week" by BBC Radio 1's breakfast show listeners. When Hutchinson left, Perry took on vocal duties briefly before the band split in 1991.

== Cover art ==
Cover of "Kiss"

A strong visual identity was developed by the band, from their clothes (notably featuring cycling tops, the idea for which came after seeing a cyclist standing at the bar in The Faversham public house in Leeds) to their cover art. The first singles had a punk like cut-up graphic design produced by the band featuring slogans and mini-manifestos. "Stay Young!! Say Yeah!! Call Each Other Bay-Beah!!" "You CAN live forever with the Age of Chance". The slogans and visual imagery were passed to The Designers Republic who produced a series of classic cover designs for the Kiss releases and the series of 1987 Virgin releases. The sleeve of Don't Get Mad ... Get Even was one of Q magazine's 100 Best Record Covers of All Time (2001), with the citation describing the collaborations as "Too intricate to rightfully exist in the pre-desktop publishing age, the sleeves were edgy, loaded, with menacing visual manifestos adorned with slogans ... alongside bar codes, cruise missiles and (first woman in space)Valentina Tereshkova's face."

Designer Ian Anderson recalled that "The way they were presented was very much as a philosophy; it was a punk attitude crossed with disco styling, that asked questions to get a reaction. Once the vocabulary was set, the sleeves almost designed themselves. We may have done the designs, but the language was created by the band."

== Line-up ==
- Steven Elvidge (vocals)
- Geoff Taylor (bass guitar)
- Neil Howson (lead guitar)
- Jan Perry (percussion)
- Charles Hutchinson (vocals on Mecca)

== Discography ==
=== Albums ===
- Kiss Crush Collision (mini LP, 1986) - UK Indie No. 4
- One Thousand Years of Trouble (1987)
- Mecca (1990)

=== Singles ===
- "Motorcity" (1985) - UK Indie No. 26
- "Bible of the Beats" (1986) - UK Indie No. 3
- "The Twilight World of Sonic Disco EP" (contains the first two 7" singles, 1986)
- "Kiss" (1986) - UK Indie No. 1 (re-issued 1987), UK No. 50, NZ No. 21
- "Who's Afraid of the Big Bad Noise" (1987) - NZ No. 34
- "Don't Get Mad ... Get Even" (1987)
- "Take It!" (1988)
- "Time's Up" (1989)
- "Higher Than Heaven" (1990)
- "Playing with Fire" (1990)
- "Slow Motion Riot" (1991)
- "She Is Filled with Secrets" (1991)
