= New York City (The Armoury Show song) =

1987 song by the Armoury Show

Single by The Armoury Show

from the album Monkey Cry
- B-side: "Whirlwind"
- Released: 13 April 1987
- Length: 3:35
- Label: Parlophone
- Songwriter(s): Richard Jobson; Russell Webb
- Producer(s): Howard Gray

The Armoury Show singles chronology
"Love in Anger" (1987)	"New York City" (1987)

"New York City" is a song by British new wave band The Armoury Show, released by Parlophone on 13 April 1987 as the second single from the band's unreleased second and final studio album, Monkey Cry. The song was written by band members Richard Jobson and Russell Webb and was produced by Howard Gray.

== Background ==
After the release of their 1985 debut album Waiting for the Floods and a tour to promote it, the Armoury Show went on hiatus, and guitarist John McGeoch and drummer John Doyle left the band. In late 1986, the remaining two members, Richard Jobson (vocals) and Russell Webb (bass), reunited as a duo and began working on new material under the Armoury Show name, including "New York City". With their original contract with EMI America coming to an end, they signed a new deal with the UK division of EMI's Parlophone and, to replace their former bandmates, recruited guitarist Dave Lockwood and drummer Ray Weston in early 1987.

"New York City" was written as a critical view of the United States city, with Jobson describing it as "a narrative about terror, paranoia and fear in the big city". Speaking to Daily Record in 1987, he stated,

"Glasgow is still painted as a dirty, violent city, while New York is supposed to be the cosmopolitan, arty centre of the world. I'd like to think I've reversed the roles a little. Although I'm from Fife, I've always had this affinity with Glasgow – I'm an adopted Glaswegian in many respects. I love their self-deprecating humour and sense of values."

== Release ==
"New York City" was released as a single on both 7-inch and 12-inch formats on 13 April 1987. An alternative 12-inch release, with the "John Robie Dance Mix" as the A-side, was released the following week on 21 April 1987. The single failed to reach the top 100 of the UK Singles Chart and reached a peak of 109 in its first week in the charts on 25 April 1987.

The song was to have been included on the band's second studio album, Monkey Cry, which was due for release later in 1987 but was ultimately shelved. The Armoury Show disbanded in 1988, making "New York City" their last release. In 2013, Cherry Red Records released an expanded two-disc edition of the Armoury Show's 1985 album Waiting for the Floods. The bonus tracks included "New York City", its John Robie remixes and the B-side "Whirlwind".

== Music video ==
A music video was filmed to promote the song. It features appearances from two of Jobson's brothers.

== Critical reception ==
Upon its release, Jerry Smith of Music Week called "New York City" an "excellent rap and rhythm influenced number", with a "chanted chorus" and "jaundiced view of the Big Apple". English broadcaster Gary Crowley, as guest reviewer for Number One stated, "This is dead good – got me moving! Very New York disco, I hope this is the one for them – Jobson's a real diamond geezer. Good video too." George Hill of the Peterborough Evening Telegraph described it a "savage indictment of the mean streets of the Big Apple" and the Northamptonshire Evening Telegraph noted its "jaundiced views of life in the Big Apple".

John Lee of the Huddersfield Daily Examiner praised the "nervy and raw" track as the "best" Armoury Show single since "Castles in Spain". He wrote, "The enigmatic poet, actor and singer Richard Jobson has a flair for the classically-ridiculous. His Show partner Russell Webb certainly brings out the best in him, with fairly formidable results." Jim Whiteford of The Kilmarnock Standard considered "New York City" to be a "part poem/part song", with a "caustic comment on the American super-city" that "won't bridge any gaps between ourselves and the colonials". He concluded, "Not one I'd tip as a big hit but it is strongly repetitive".

Don Watson of NME stated, "Professional Scots in funk workout. Jobson claims: 'If New York is the promised land then Glasgow must be Heaven.' Illogical deductions over soul reconstructions as pleasant and as apparently pointless as everything since The Absolute Game." Paul Benbow of the Reading Evening Post remarked, "'If New York is the promised land then Glasgow must be heaven' wail the vocals. Hoots mon da'ye want a riot. Hard bite at the Big Apple." Westworld reviewed the single as guest reviewers for Record Mirror, with Bob Andrews calling it "bland Scottish funk" and Nick Burton describing it as "a bit too arty for our taste".

== Track listing ==
7–inch single (UK)

1. "New York City" – 3:35
2. "Whirlwind" – 4:46

12-inch single (UK)

1. "New York City" – 6:06
2. "New York City" (N.Y. Agogo) – 6:36
3. "Whirlwind" – 4:46

12-inch remix single (UK)

1. "New York City" (The John Robie Dance Mix) – 8:19
2. "New York City" (N.Y. Agogo) – 6:36
3. "Whirlwind" – 4:46

== Personnel ==
Production

- Howard Gray – production ("New York City")
- John Robie – remixing ("New York City")
- Junior Vasquez – editing ("Dance Version" of "New York City")
- The Armoury Show – production ("Whirlwind")
- Mike Gregovic – engineering ("Whirlwind")

Other

- Larry Dale Gordon – main photograph
- Alastair Thain – back photograph

== Charts ==
Chart (1987)	Peak position
UK Singles Chart (Gallup)	109
