= Love in Anger =

1987 song by the Armoury Show

Single by The Armoury Show

from the album Monkey Cry
- B-side: "Tender Is the Night"
- Released: 5 January 1987
- Length: 5:12
- Label: Parlophone
- Songwriter(s): The Armoury Show
- Producer(s): Howard Gray

The Armoury Show singles chronology
"Castles in Spain" (1985)	"Love in Anger" (1987)	"New York City" (1987)

"Love in Anger" is a song by British new wave band The Armoury Show, released by Parlophone on 5 January 1987 as the lead single from the band's unreleased second and final studio album, Monkey Cry. The song was written by the Armoury Show and was produced by Howard Gray. "Love in Anger" peaked at number 63 in the UK Singles Chart.

== Background ==
After the release of their 1985 debut album Waiting for the Floods and a tour to promote it, the Armoury Show went on hiatus, and guitarist John McGeoch and drummer John Doyle left the band. In late 1986, the remaining two members, Richard Jobson (vocals) and Russell Webb (bass), reunited as a duo and began working on new material under the Armoury Show name, including "Love in Anger". With their original contract with EMI America coming to an end, they signed a new deal with the UK division of EMI's Parlophone and, to replace their former bandmates, recruited guitarist Dave Lockwood and drummer Ray Weston in early 1987.

In a 1987 interview, Jobson said, "Russell came up with 'Love in Anger', which I think is a lovely song."

== Release ==
"Love in Anger" was released as a single on 5 January 1987, during which time the Armoury Show were still a duo. It was the band's highest charting release on the UK Singles Chart, peaking at number 63. The song was also to have been included on the band's second studio album, Monkey Cry, which was due for release later in 1987 but was ultimately shelved.

The 12-inch format of the single included "Uptown, Downtown", which is a reworking of "Love in Anger" and features the same backing track but with different lyrics, including quotes by German-American poet and writer Charles Bukowski.

== Critical reception ==
Upon its release, Steve Hartley of the Hartlepool Mail called it the Armoury Show's "best yet" and added that the "stand-out feature" is Mickey Donnelly's "moody sax". John Lee of the Huddersfield Daily Examiner remarked that the band is in "dramatic mood on a taut single which finds its purpose in odd percussion and tuneful horns". He concluded, "Should be a real biggie!" James Belsey of the Bristol Evening Post picked it as the newspaper's "single of the week" and stated, "Best thing Jobson and his band have done, a strikingly original, gloriously rich number and performance."

Roy Wilkinson of Sounds wrote, "A strummed acoustic guitar and saxophone lay down the foundation for Richard to stick out his chin and rein in his often overwrought voice in this atmospheric, indeed tasteful bout of elemental longing. Surprise, surprise, a decent Armoury Show single." David Quantick of NME commented, "Shimmering acoustic guitars and brushes, and a brooding melody mean that the Armoury Show are having a go at not bludgeoning our ears. Unfortunately, the whole affair sounds like Roger Daltrey being sensitive and the tune is a tad unmemorable." Alan Poole of the Northamptonshire Evening Telegraph considered it "another excellent single" from the band, but added that "one wonders if it's again a little understated for chart purposes".

== Track listing ==
7–inch single (UK and Australasia)

1. "Love in Anger" – 5:12
2. "Tender Is the Night" – 4:09

12-inch single (UK)

1. "Love in Anger" – 5:12
2. "Uptown, Downtown" – 6:37
3. "Tender Is the Night" – 4:09

== Personnel ==
Production

- Howard Gray – production ("Love in Anger", "Uptown, Downtown")
- The Armoury Show – production ("Tender Is the Night")

Other

- Alastair Thain – photography
- Mark Farrow at 3 – design

== Charts ==
Chart (1987)	Peak position
UK Singles (OCC)	63
