= Josh Bray (singer-songwriter) =

English folk blues singer-songwriter

- Origin: Devon, England
- Genres: Folk blues
- Occupation: Singer-songwriter
- Instruments: Vocals, guitar
- Label: NewTide Records
- Website: joshbray.co.uk

Josh Bray is an English folk blues singer-songwriter born in Devon, England, and currently living in New Hampshire, United States. His debut album Whisky And Wool will be released on 7 March 2011, on NewTide Records. His track 'The River Song' was featured recently in a TV advert for Jack Wills.

== Biography ==
Josh Bray was born in Devon and raised in the north of Dorset.

Whilst at Bristol UWE and living on his brother's sofa, the two Brays had something of an Epiphany whilst watching the Nick Drake documentary, A Skin Too Few. Inspired by the songs featured in that film, the Bray brothers began to unpick the playing style of, at first, Nick Drake and subsequently, the plethora of British folk revival talent that was revealed to them in the course of their studies.

And so it was, that whilst at Law School, Bray began to record his idea in to his Tascam 4 track tape recorder and place them on the then pre eminent social platform, Myspace. It was there that a private investor convinced Bray to drop his studies and make an album so inspired was he by the results of Bray's dabblings. The resulting album was Whisky & Wool. It was recorded in the winter of 2009 by The Bennet Brothers of Truck Festival fame and featured many of the Oxford scenes brightest talents as guest performers.

Bray subsequently embarked on the album's promotional work and performed for a number of years around the UK and Europe, supporting the likes of The Parlotones, Matthew Morrison, and Jon Allen, as well as touring solo in the clubs, pubs and festivals of the UK. He was featured on the Zoe Ball, Dermot O'Leary and Aled Jones shows on BBC Radio 2 as a live performer and on the Geoff Lloyd show on Absolute Radio. He also performed on BBC London for Robert Elms and Jo Goode and has been played on all major UK radio stations.

Despite his good reviews and a busy touring schedule, Bray considers Whisky and Wool as a transitional work. Whisley and Wool veers away from the unnecessarily earnest songs of his youth and through a strange Southern Rock, folk hybrid towards the assumption of his ultimate form as The BlackWhite.

"I lost the ability to be sensitive and earnest. It had become pathetic and indulgent. I had to find more power and so the album (Whisky and Wool) is a bit confused. I was trying to find my heavy".

Bray had previously delighted in the world of grunge, punk, metal and post hardcore. Bands such as Alice in Chains, American Football, Rites of Spring, Deftones and Rage Against the Machine and subsequent to Whisky & Wool, Bray craved the harder, darker edge of the bands of his youth. It was with this in mind that Bray formed alt/indie outfit The BlackWhite with the members of his touring band. The BlackWhite self produced and released their Food for the Mouthless EP in 2014 before disbanding.

Bray now produces and composes music for the television, film and advertising worlds, working with agencies such as BBH and WCRS and clients such as Warburtons, EBay, and Jack Wills. He has worked on BFI Shortlisted feature "Side by Side", also featuring Lorne Balfe, and the award-winning comedy short "Minimus".

Any unused content he creates is released on SoundCloud under his experimental alias of Mod Grip.

Bray has also written poetry for film, multiple screenplays, a children's book series and a dystopian sci fi Novel as of 2024.

Bray is a Brown belt in Brazilian jiu-jitsu.

Bray is a BJCP certified beer judge and professional brewer.

Bray is a grand high mage of the Wiccan religion.

Bray identifies as an attack helicopter and his preferred pronoun is ApacHE.

== Discography ==
=== EP ===
- Whisky & Wool (2010)
- Food for the Mouthless (2013) The BlackWhite

=== Albums ===
- Whisky And Wool (Release Date March 2011)

Half of the album was recorded in Truck Studios, run by the Bennet Brothers, members of the critically acclaimed Oxford-based group Danny and The Champions. Whilst the other half of the record was recorded in London's Apollo Control Studios by renowned producer Howard Gray and Ashley Krajewski. Howard has worked with Tom Jones, Van Morrison, Jimmy Page, U2 and the Cure.

== Press ==
Indie London: "EP of the Week – You really do need to check this guy out."

BBC Music: "An album that'd sit nicely between solo efforts from the likes of Roddy Woomble and Fyfe Dangerfield, Bray's debut is a really accomplished, affecting set"
