= Baker's Dozen (card game) =

Solitaire card game

- A Patience game
- A deal of Baker’s Dozen in mid-play in PySolFC
- Named variants: Castles in Spain, Good Measure, Portuguese Solitaire, Spanish Patience
- Type: Open packer
- Family: Bisley
- Deck: Single 52-card
- Playing time: 15 min
- Odds of winning: 1 in 2

Baker's Dozen is a patience or card solitaire using a single pack of fifty-two playing cards. The game is so called because of the 13 columns in the game, the number in a baker's dozen.

== History ==
First published by Dick in 1883 as The Baker's Dozen, the rules have changed little since. The only exception is that, in Dick's description, the thirteen packets are dealt face down and only the top card is turned. Only when the exposed top cards are moved to the foundations or other depots, may the next card be turned over. However, in later versions, thirteen columns are dealt face up and overlapping so that all the cards are visible, making the game easier.

== Rules ==
First, the cards are dealt into thirteen packets of four cards each to form the tableau, resulting in 13 columns. Any king that is in the top or middle of each column must be placed on the bottom before the game starts. Two kings that are mixed into one column are placed on the bottom without changing their order.

The objective of the game is to build all the cards onto the four foundations by moving cards around to release others. The player must first free up the four aces and if one of them is found, it is placed on the foundation. Building on the foundation is up by suit, each from ace to king.

Only the top cards of each column are available. Cards on the tableau, if they cannot be placed on the foundations yet, can be built down regardless of suit. Furthermore, once all cards are taken out of a column, the column can never be filled.

The game is won when all cards end up in the foundations.

== Related games ==
Games that are related to Baker's Dozen include:

- In Spanish Patience, any card can fill empty tableau spaces. (In some sources, the foundations are built up regardless of suit)
- Castles in Spain is akin to Spanish Patience, but there are key differences. First, the layout is in the shape of a castle; second, Kings may not be repositioned at the start; third, it is a half-open packer since only the top cards of each packet are face up; fourth, cards must be packed in alternating colour as well as descending sequence; fifth, whole or partial sequences may be transferred between packets provided the sequence is maintained; and sixth, spaces may be filled by a card or sequence.
- In Good Measure, two aces are taken out and placed on the foundations while the rest of the deck is shuffled and laid out in columns of five cards, resulting in 10 columns. Like in Baker's Dozen, Kings that are at the top or in the middle of their respective columns are placed at the bottom and the game proceeds in the process stated above.
- Portuguese Solitaire is halfway between Baker's Dozen and Spanish Patience because empty columns can only be filled with Kings.
- Bisley builds foundations upwards from Ace and downwards from King simultaneously.

== See also ==
- Bisley
- List of patiences and solitaires
- Glossary of patience and solitaire terms

== Literature ==
- Dick, William Brisbane (1883). Dick's Games of Patience, Or, Solitaire with Cards. 44 games. NY: Dick & Fitzgerald.
- Phillips, Hubert (1976). The Pan Book of Card Games. 21st printing. London: Pan Books.
