= The Armoury Show =

British pop band

- Origin: Edinburgh, Scotland
- Genres: New wave, post-punk, pop rock
- Years active: 1983–1988 2024–present
- Labels: Parlophone; Last Night From Glasgow
- Spinoff of: The Skids, Magazine
- Past members: Richard Jobson; John McGeoch; Russell Webb; John Doyle; Ray McVeigh; Dave Lockwood; Ray Weston

The Armoury Show were a British new wave band, formed in 1983 and consisting of Richard Jobson on vocals, Russell Webb on bass guitar, John McGeoch on guitar and John Doyle on drums.

The band was named after The Armory Show, a famous 1913 modern art exhibition held in New York. They released six singles and one studio album in their brief existence.

== History ==
The band comprised Richard Jobson, Russell Webb, John McGeoch and John Doyle. Each member had previously been in critically acclaimed and commercially successful bands; Jobson and Webb were in The Skids, whilst McGeoch and Doyle had been in post-punk pioneers Magazine.

The Skids had dissolved in 1981 and Magazine in 1982, each following the release of their final albums (Joy and Magic, Murder and the Weather, respectively). John McGeoch had left Magazine in 1980, before the recording of their last album, joining Siouxsie and the Banshees. He also replaced Stuart Adamson for a Peel session recorded by The Skids in 1981.

According to Russell Webb, in the sleeve notes of the 2013 re-issue of their album Waiting for the Floods, the intention was not to be a band, but a collective of musicians getting together to write songs and make music in the studio. McGeoch persuaded his compatriots to take their songs on the road and, following a press showcase at The Venue in London, the band signed to Parlophone and EMI America.

Their debut single, "Castles in Spain", was released in 1984, followed later that year by "We Can Be Brave Again". Given the green light to record an album, the band spent four weeks at Manor Studios in rural Oxfordshire, with Public Image Ltd producer Nick Launay at the controls. The resultant album, Waiting for the Floods, and accompanying singles "Glory of Love" and a re-release of "Castles in Spain" came out in 1985.

Richard Jobson spent less and less time with the band. In 1986, following the tour to promote the album, both McGeoch and Doyle left the band, with the former joining Public Image Ltd. and the latter working with former Buzzcocks lead singer/guitarist Pete Shelley.

When Jobson returned from China, where he had been working as a model, he reunited with Webb, calling on Dave Lockwood (guitar) and Ray Weston (drums) to record tracks for their next album. The singles "Love in Anger" and "New York City" followed. In 1988, it was announced that the band had split up, with what would have been their second album Monkey Cry promoted as Richard Jobson's solo debut Badman. After a brief solo career Jobson became a television presenter and film director. Webb pursued a solo career before joining McGeoch in Public Image Ltd in 1992, making his live debut at the Reading Festival.

In 2019, it was announced that the band would be resurrected under the amended name the Armory Show with a new line up (Jobson being the only original member), featuring Nickolas Young and Rory Cowieson of Scottish shoegaze band Domiciles and Nick Hernandez of Foreignfox.

On 28 March 2025, Richard Jobson re-launched the Armory Show with a new album, Dead Souls, after a near 40 year absence.

== Personnel ==
- Richard Jobson ("The Captain" during the early days in 1983) – vocals, guitar
- John McGeoch ("The Legend" during 1983) – guitar, vocals
- Russell Webb ("Universe" during 1983) – bass guitar, vocals
- John Doyle ("Doylie" during 1983) – drums
- Ray McVeigh (ex-The Professionals) – guitar (replaced John McGeoch for a while in 1986)
- Dave Lockwood – guitar (replaced Ray McVeigh)
- Ray Weston – drums (replaced John Doyle)

== Discography ==
Year	Type	Format	Title
1984	Single	Parlophone 7R6079	"Castles in Spain" / "Innocents Abroad" (UK No. 69)
1984	12"	Parlophone 12R6079	"Castles in Spain" (Wubb Dug Mix) / "Innocents Abroad" / "Is It a Wonder"
1985	Single	Parlophone 7R6087	"We Can Be Brave Again" (Remix) / "A Feeling" (UK No. 66)
1985	12"	Parlophone 12R6087	"We Can Be Brave Again" (Extended Version) / "A Feeling" / "Catherine"
1985	Album	LP ARM 1 / EMI 17163 / EMI 2403591	Waiting for the Floods (UK No. 57)
1985	Cassette	MC TC-ARM 1	Waiting for the Floods
1985	Single	Parlophone 7R6098	"Glory of Love" / "Higher Than the Instrumental" (UK No. 92)
1985	12"	Parlophone 12R6098	"Glory of Love" (Universal Mix) / "Glory of Love" / "Higher Than the Instrumental"
1985	Single	Parlophone 7R6109	"Castles in Spain" / "A Gathering"
1985	12"	Parlophone 12R6109	"Castles in Spain" / "A Gathering" / "Ring Those Bells"
1987	Single	Parlophone 7R6149	"Love in Anger" / "Tender Is the Night" (UK No. 63)
1987	12"	Parlophone 12R6149	"Love in Anger" / "Uptown Downtown" / "Tender Is the Night"
1987	Single	Parlophone 7R6153	"New York City" / "Whirlwind"
1987	12"	Parlophone 12R6153	"New York City" (John Robie Remix) / "New York City (N.Y. Agogo)" / "Whirlwind"
1987	12"	Parlophone 12RX6153	"New York City" (John Robie Dance Remix) / "New York City (NY Agogo)" / "Whirlwind"
2001	Album	Track Records TRK1008CD	Waiting for the Floods (reissue)
2013	Album	Cherry Red Records CDBRED564	Waiting for the Floods (two-disc extended reissue)
2025	Album	Last Night From Glasgow	Dead Souls

== See also ==
- Slik
- Skids
- Magazine
- Siouxsie and the Banshees
- Public Image Ltd.

== Bibliography ==
- Sullivan-Burke, Rory (April 2022). The Light Pours Out of Me: The Authorised Biography of John McGeoch. Omnibus Press. ISBN 978-1913172664.
