= Howard Gray =

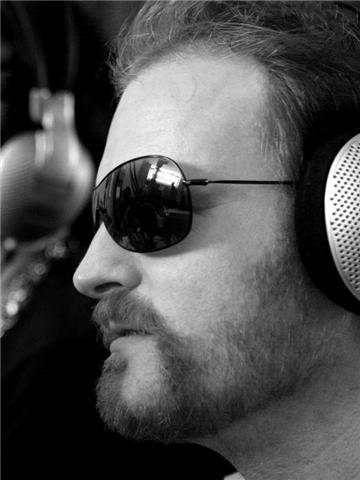
- Howard Gray in studio, London

Background information
- Born: Howard Gray; 15 July 1962 (age 64); Sydney, Australia
- Genre: Electronic
- Occupations: Producer; composer; musician
- Years active: 1980–present
- Website: apollo440.com

Howard Gray (born 15 July 1962) is an English musician, sound engineer, programmer, composer, re-mixer and producer who has worked with Public Image Ltd, Orchestral Manoeuvres in the Dark, Kirsty MacColl, the Armoury Show, the Pale Fountains, Japan, the Stranglers, Simple Minds, the Pretenders, XTC, UB40, Scritti Politti, Cherubs, Terence Trent D'Arby, Jean Michel Jarre, the Cure, Manic Street Preachers, U2, Puff Daddy & Jimmy Page, Tom Jones and Van Morrison.

He is a founding member of the dance/rock group Apollo 440.

== Early years ==
Howard James Gray was born in Sydney, Australia, shortly after his parents emigrated from their native Liverpool. The family returned to Liverpool when Gray was six months old, and the city played its role in forming the young Gray's musical passions. An early interest in music and sound recording led to the formation of his first band at the age of 15, Alvin the Aardvark and the Fuzzy Ants, with his brother, Trevor Gray, and fellow schoolfriends Jono 'Kumo' Podmore, James Gardner, Norman 'Noko' Fisher-Jones and Gary Hancock.

In 1980, during his last year at school, Gray landed a job as a tape operator at Richard Branson's notorious Manor Studio, the residential facility built on a country estate near Oxford. Throughout his tenure at The Manor, and at Branson's recently completed Townhouse Studios in London's Hammersmith, Gray worked with many producers, first as an assistant sound engineer, then as an engineer. The producer he worked with most often was Steve Lillywhite. Some of the many artists Gray worked with include Public Image Ltd, the Stranglers, Kirsty MacColl, the Armoury Show, Japan, Rip Rig + Panic and Van Morrison. He was Virgin's house engineer on Orchestral Manoeuvres in the Dark's album Architecture and Morality, and engineered producer Adrian Sherwood's groundbreaking Dub Syndicate album The Pounding System (Ambience in Dub).

== 1980s: from sound engineer to producer ==
When Gray broke away from the Virgin studio system, he initially went to work as Steve Lillywhite's engineer, which led to him working with such diverse artists as Simple Minds, XTC, the Pretenders, UB40 and Abba's Anni-Frid Lyngstad ('Frida').

As a producer in his own right, Gray's big break came when, in 1983, he was asked by UB40 to help produce their multi-platinum selling album of cover versions, Labour of Love. Gray had previously worked with the band at the Townhouse on their UB44 album. Credited as engineer and assistant producer of Labour of Love, an administrative error caused Gray's role to be credited only as tape operator on the UK and US No. 1 single "Red Red Wine". Still only 21 years old, Gray also engineered and co-produced UB40's next album Geffery Morgan.

Gray went on to work with Scritti Politti on Cupid & Psyche 85, the Cure on The Head on the Door and he produced Terence Trent D'Arby's debut single "If You Let Me Stay", from his 12 million-selling album Introducing the Hardline According to Terence Trent D'Arby. Some of the other artists Gray produced through the mid- to late '80s include the Pale Fountains, Head, the Screaming Blue Messiahs, Hugh Cornwell, Red Guitars, Danny Wilson and Age of Chance.

== 1990s–2000s: Apollo 440, soundtracks, remixes and producing ==
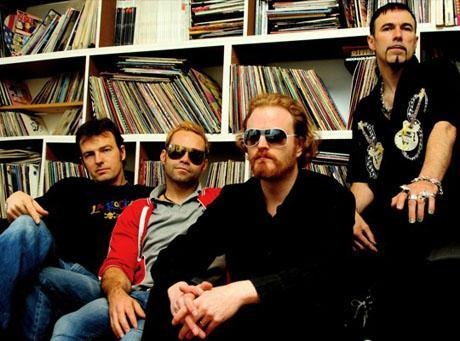
Howard Gray (second from right) with Apollo 440 in their London studio, 2009

In 1990, Gray formed the dance/rock group Apollo 440 with brother Trevor Gray and old friends and colleagues James Gardner and Noko, who had continued their musical careers with other bands, including Luxuria (Noko) and The Umbrella (Noko and Gardner). Gray's role within Apollo 440 revolves mostly around sound sculpture/production or, as he refers to it, his role is that of the "Vibe Controller".

Apollo 440 have released four albums on their Stealth Sonic Recordings label, distributed by Epic Records and achieved three UK top 10 and eight UK top 40 singles releases.

With Apollo 440, and under their Stealth Sonic Orchestra guise, Gray has recorded for various film soundtracks, including Lost in Space and Charlie's Angels, worked on a number of games for PlayStation, including FIFA '98, Spider-Man and Anti-Grav, and remixed a diverse range of artists, including Manic Street Preachers, Puff Daddy & Jimmy Page, U2, Puretone, Ennio Morricone and James. Apollo 440 have worked on a number of tracks with Jean Michel Jarre, Jeff Beck (producing three tracks on Beck's album Jeff) and Tomoyasu Hotei.

In addition to his role with Apollo 440, Gray continues to undertake outside productions, including work with Tom Jones, Manic Street Preachers, Gareth Sager & Jock Scott, Eighties Matchbox B-Line Disaster, Drive By Argument and the Wolfgang Press. Gray has also collaborated with John Fortis on the production of The Cazals, Eight Legs and Art Brut's debut album Bang Bang Rock and Roll.

== 2010–present day ==
Gray was co-producer of the Josh Bray album Whiskey and Wool.

Apollo 440's fifth studio album, the 11-track The Future's What It Used to Be, was released in January 2012.

== Trivia ==
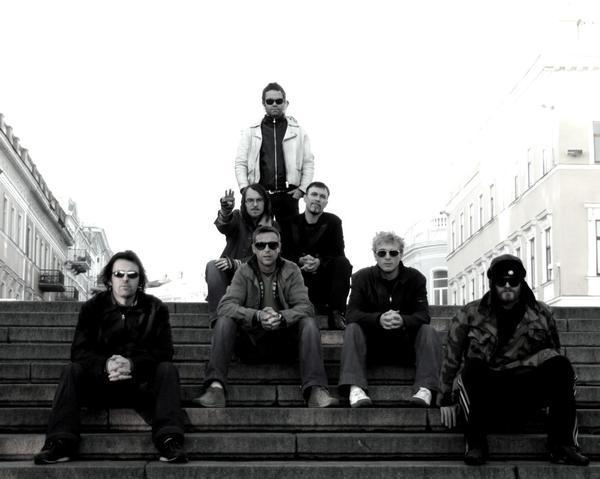
Howard Gray (far right) and Apollo 440, Odesa, Ukraine, 2007. Image by Ashley Krajewski

Gray's debut production, Trevor Herion's "Love Chains", features the uncredited backing vocals of Holly Johnson, who was to record "Relax" with Frankie Goes to Hollywood in the same studio the next day.

David Slade, the director of the music video "Stop the Rock" for Gray's band Apollo 440, went on to direct Eclipse, the third film in the Twilight series.

== Film soundtrack discography ==
- The Game Plan (2007) - track: "Heart Go Boom"
- Cursed (2005) - track: "Stadium Parking Lot" - aka "Wes Craven's Cursed"
- Gran Turismo 4 (2004) - track: "Hot Rod Honeymoon"
- Agent Cody Banks 2: Destination London (2004) - track: "Time is Running Out"
- EuroTrip (2004) - track: "Make My Dreams Come True"
- Chasing Liberty (2004) - track: "Stop the Rock"
- Resident Evil (2002) - track: "Wall of Death"
- ATV Offroad Fury (2001) - track: "Yo! Future"
- Evil Woman (2001) - track: "Stop The Rock"
- Charlie's Angels (2000) - "Charlie's Angels 2000"
- Bedazzled (2000) - track: "Stop the Rock (Mint Royale Mix)"
- Spider-Man (2000) - "Theme Song"
- Loser (2000) - track: "Stop The Rock"
- Gone in Sixty Seconds (2000) - track: "Stop the Rock"
- Daria (1 episode, 2000) - I Loathe a Parade (2000) TV episode - track: "Stop the Rock"
- Gran Turismo 2 (1999) (VG) - track: "Cold Rock the Mic"
- Rogue Trader (1999) - track: "Liquid Cool"
- Lost in Space (1998) - track: "Will & Penny's Theme"

== Production discography (selected) ==
- Pacific Street (CD, Album) Toshiba EMI Ltd 2001
- Unless (12") Virgin 1983 Unless (7", Single)
- (Don't Let Your Love) Start A War (Single) (Don't Let Your Love) ... Virgin
- Geffery Morgan... (LP) Virgin 1984
- I'm Not Fooled (12") DEP International
- If It Happens Again (7", Single) Virgin Records
- New Dreams For Old (12") On The Beach Red Flame
- Now That's What I Call Music 4 (2xLP) If It Happens Again EMI Records, Virgin 1984
- Riddle Me (7") Virgin 1984
- Take It Round Again (12") Arista 1984
- We Can Be Brave Again (7") We Can Be Brave Again ... Parlophone 1984
- Close To Me (CDV, Single, PAL) Stop Dead Fiction Records 1988
- Elle Adore Le Noir Pour Sortir Le Soir (7", Single) EMI Music (Belgium) 1985
- Half An Octopuss (10", Ltd) Stop Dead Fiction Records 1985
- I Got You Babe (7", Single) Nkomo A Go Go Virgin Music (Canada), DEP International 1985
- I Got You Babe / Nkomo A Go Go (7") Nkomo A Go Go (Special... A&M Records 1985
- The Head on the Door (LP, Album) Elektra 2006
- Twin Cadillac Valentine (7") Twin Cadillac Valentine WEA, 1985
- Who's That Girl (7") EMI Music (Belgium) 1985
- Yé-Yé (LP) EMI Music (Belgium) 1985 Yé Yé (CD, Album) EMI Music (Belgium) 2004
- America And Me (7") Marianne Virgin 1986
- Gun-Shy (CD, Album) Elektra 1986
- National Avenue (Sunday Afternoon) (12", Promo) Virgin
- Quadpus (12", Single) A Night Like This Elektra
- Tales of the Expected (CD, Album) Virgin
- The Best Of (Ça Vient, Ça Vient, Change Pas Demain) (LP) EMI Music (Belgium) 1986
- Wild Blue Yonder (7") WEA Records Ltd., WEA Records Ltd.
- Don't Get Mad...Get Even! (12") Virgin
- If You Let Me Stay (12") If You Let Me Stay (Re... CBS
- Introducing The Hardline According To Terence Trent D'Arby (LP, Album) CBS
- Love in Anger (12") Love in Anger, Uptown,... Parlophone
- Mary's Prayer (7") Monkey's Shiny Day Virgin Records America, Inc., Virgin Records America, Inc.
- Meet Danny Wilson (CD, Album) Virgin 1987
- New York City (12") New York City, New York... Parlophone
- On The Corner (12") On The Corner (7") EMI Records Ltd.
- One Thousand Years of Trouble (CD, Album) Virgin
- The Best of UB40 - Volume 1 (CD) EMI Music (Brazil)
- Who's Afraid of the Big Bad Noise? (12") Virgin
- Wishing Well (The Darbinian Mix) (12") If You Let Me Stay CBS
- Badman (LP, Album) Uptown/Downtown Parlophone 1988
- Car's Outside (12") Virgin 1988
- I Can Speak American (12") Twin Cadillac Valentine WEA Records Ltd., WEA Records Ltd. 1988
- Sin Bin (12") Virgin 1988
- Wanted (CD) Got To Share, Fine Time Big Life
- Never Gonna Be The Same (10", Single) Nothing Ever Goes To P... Virgin 1989 Totally Religious (CD, Album) Elektra
- Heart of Darkness (LP, Album) ZTT, ZTT
- Totally Religious, (Album) Elektra, 1989
- Little Brother (Remix) (12") Little Brother Big Life 1990
- Come On! (12") Reverb Records (2) 1991
- Don't Lose Your Dreams (10", Ltd, Num) Siren Records (8)
- Electric Landlady (CD, Album) Walking Down Madison Virgin
- Infamy! Or How I Didn't Get Where I Am Today (LP) Siren Records (8)
- Pandora's Box (7") All She Wants Is Every... Virgin
- Scarlet Red And Blue (Cass) Mountains, Rainbow PolyGram, M & G Records 1991
- Sugar Tax (Album) ◄ (13 versions) Virgin Records America ... 1991
- Sweet Danny Wilson (LP, Album) Ruby's Golden Wedding,... Virgin 1991
- Sweet Danny Wilson/Three-In-A-Bed Romp (2xCD, Comp, Ltd) Ruby's Golden Wedding,... Virgin 1991
- Walking Down Madison (7") Virgin 1991
- Beneath The Pavement...The Beach (CD, EP, Ltd) Rev., Capital of Pain Concrete Productions 1994
- Going South (CD, Maxi) Going South (7" Version) 4AD, Warner Bros. Records 1994
- The Lead and How to Swing It (CD, Album) Show Me Interscope Records, Atlantic, ZTT 1994
- Kevin Carter - The Remixes (12", Promo) Epic 1996
- The First Wave (CD, Single, Enh) Toys 1:70, Sony Music Entertainment (Norway) 1997
- If You Tolerate This Your Children Will Be Next (CD, Single) Prologue To History, M... Epic 1998
- BSE Bangin' Summer Extravaganza (CD, Album) Prologue To History Select Magazine 1999
- The Very Best of UB40 1980 - 2000 (Comp) ◄ (4 versions) If It Happens Again Simply Vinyl (S12) ... 2000
- The Very Best of UB40 1980 - 2000 (CD, Comp) Virgin, Dep International 2000
- Everything Is Beautiful (A Retrospective 1983–1995) (CD, Comp, Album) Executioner (Adamson Mix) 4AD 2001
- Forever Delayed - The Greatest Hits - Special Edition (2xCD, Comp) The Everlasting (Steal... Epic 2002
- The Best of 1990-2000 & B-Sides (Comp) ◄ (2 versions) Mysterious Ways (Solar... Interscope Records 2002
- 50 Years of the Greatest Hit Singles - Platinum Collection (2xCD, Comp) Red Red Wine Virgin, Virgin 2003
- Essential (CD) EMI Music (Belgium) 2003
- Lipstick Traces - A Secret History of Manic Street Preachers (2xCD, Comp) Prologue To History Epic 2003
- Sugar Tax / Junk Culture (2xCD) Speed of Light Virgin 2003
- Uncovered By Heartbeat (CD and 12" album) Cargo Records 2005
- Bang Bang Rock & Roll (CD, Album) Fierce Panda 2005
- It's Magnetic / Out on 24s (7") Kids 2006
- LateNightTales (CD, Album, Comp) Unless Azuli Records, Azuli Records 2007
- Leigh-On-Sea (7", Single, Ltd) Leigh-On-Sea Label Fandango 2007
- Sex Lines Are Expensive Comedy (7", Single) Lizard King Records 2007
- The Sega Method / Lower Your Pieces (7", Ltd) Lizard King Records 2007
- What Is Woman? (12", Red) Stiff Records 2007
- Drive-By Argument (CD, Album) Lizard King Records 2008
