= Waiting for the Floods =

Studio album by The Armoury Show
- Released: September 1985
- Studio: Sarm West, London; The Manor Studio, Shipton-on-Cherwell
- Genre: New wave, post-punk
- Length: 45:32
- Label: EMI America
- Producer: Nick Launay

Waiting for the Floods is the first and only studio album by British new wave band The Armoury Show. It was released in September 1985 and entered the UK Albums chart at number 57 that month.

== Reception ==
Professional ratings
Review scores
| Source | Rating |
|---|---|
| AllMusic | 4/5 stars |

In his retrospective review, Dan LeRoy of AllMusic praised the album, writing "[Richard] Jobson created an album that, though it went largely unnoticed, outdid Big Country – and nearly every other "big-guitar" band of the time, save U2 – in anthemic power."

Jeffrey X. Martin of Popshifter gave the album a glowing review when it was reissued as a two-disc set in 2013, writing, "Theatrical without being pompous, Waiting For The Floods is Arthurian nationalism at its bravest and most stentorian. You half expect the songs to rise up from the lake, bearing Excalibur."

== Track listing ==
Side A
| No. | Title | Length |
|---|---|---|
| 1. | "Castles in Spain" | 4:35 |
| 2. | "Kyrie" | 3:56 |
| 3. | "A Feeling" | 4:36 |
| 4. | "Jungle of Cities" (Omitted from North American releases and 2001 UK reissue) | 3:48 |
| 5. | "We Can Be Brave Again" | 3:58 |
| 6. | "Higher Than the World" | 4:39 |

Side B
| No. | Title | Length |
|---|---|---|
| 1. | "The Glory of Love" | 4:52 |
| 2. | "Waiting for the Floods" | 5:25 |
| 3. | "A Sense of Freedom" | 4:00 |
| 4. | "Sleep City Sleep" | 4:53 |
| 5. | "Avalanche" | 5:10 |

2013 reissue CD 1 bonus tracks
| No. | Title | Length |
|---|---|---|
| 12. | "Innocents Abroad" |
| 13. | "Is It a Wonder" |
| 14. | "Catherine" |
| 15. | "A Gathering" |
| 16. | "Ring Those Bells" |
| 17. | "We Can Be Brave Again" (Single Remix) |

2013 reissue CD 2 tracks
| No. | Title | Length |
|---|---|---|
| 1. | "Castles in Spain" (Single DJ Edit) |
| 2. | "Glory of Love" (Single DJ Edit) |
| 3. | "Castles in Spain" (Wubb Dug Mix) |
| 4. | "We Can Be Brave Again" (Extended Version) |
| 5. | "Glory of Love" (Universal Mix) |
| 6. | "Higher Than the Instrumental" |
| 7. | "Tender Is the Night" |
| 8. | "New York City" (7" Single) |
| 9. | "Whirlwind" |
| 10. | "New York City" (N.Y.A. Go Go) |
| 11. | "New York City" (John Robie Remix) |
| 12. | "New York City" (The John Robie Dance Mix) |

The 2-disc reissue is not a complete compilation of The Armoury Show's work. Missing are two of their three charted singles; the original non-LP single recording of "Castles In Spain" (produced by Nick Tauber), and the non-LP A-side "Love in Anger". Also missing is "Uptown Downtown", which was on the "Love in Anger" 12", and the band-produced demo version of "A Feeling" which appeared on the 12" of "We Can Be Brave Again".

== Personnel ==
The Armoury Show

- Richard "The Captain" Jobson – lead vocals, drums, drum programming
- John "The Legend" McGeoch – lead and rhythm guitar, backing vocals; 12-string guitar and piano on "Sense of Freedom"; Arpeggio Roland guitar synthesizer on "Avalanche"
- Russell "Universe" Webb – fretless bass, keyboards, drums, drum programming, harmony and backing vocals
- John "Doylie" Doyle – drums, drum programming, backing vocals

Additional personnel

- Nick "Fats" Launay - last bass note on "Glory of Love"; drum programming on "Avalanche"
- Paul Fishman – keyboards, programming
- Billy Currie – violin on "Higher Than the World"
- Robin Jones - percussion, congas, timbales, cabasa, shaker, tambourine
- John Batten - backing vocals on "Castles in Spain"
- Billy Nicholls, Chris Staines, Mike Nicholls, Steve Hunt - backing vocals on "Avalanche"

Technical

- Nick Launay – production, engineering, mixing

== See also ==
- Magazine
- Public Image Ltd.
- Siouxsie and the Banshees
- Skids
- Slik
