= Hoodlum Priest =

Hoodlum Priest may refer to:

- Hoodlum Priest (film), a 1961 film by Irvin Kershner
- Hoodlum Priest (musician), a name used by producer/multi instrumentalist and composer Derek Thompson
- Hoodlum Priest (album), the 3rd album by the musician
