= Digitalis Ambigua: Gold & Poison =

Studio album by SPK
- Released: 1987
- Recorded: 1987
- Genre: Electro, EBM, synth-pop, ambient
- Length: 49:32
- Label: Original: Nettwerk; Re-issue: Festival Records
- Producer: Graeme Revell

SPK chronology
Zamia Lehmanni (1986)	Digitalis Ambigua: Gold & Poison (1987)	Oceania (1988)

Professional ratings
Review scores
Source	Rating
Allmusic	2/5 stars
New Musical Express	8/10

Digitalis Ambigua: Gold & Poison is the fifth album by the band SPK. Half of the tracks can be found on their previous record, Zamia Lehmanni.

== Track listing ==
1. "Breathless" - 4:50
2. "Mouth to Mouth" - 5:50
3. "Sheer Naked Aggression" - 4:12
4. "Crack!" - 5:30
5. "The Doctrine of Eternal Ice" - 4:24
6. "Invocation" - 5:09
7. "White Island" - 5:29
8. "Palms Crossed in Sorrow" - 5:02
9. "Alocasia Metallica" - 5:50
10. "The Garden of Earthly Delights" - 3:13

== Personnel ==
- Graeme Revell - Producer, Instrumentalist, Vocals
- Karina Hayes - Vocals
- Sinan Leong - Vocals
