= Leichenschrei =

Studio album by SPK
- Released: April 1982 (USA) / January 1983 (UK)
- Recorded: October 1981 – March 1982
- Studio: SPK/Side Effekts Studio
- Genre: Industrial, experimental, musique concrète, dark ambient
- Length: 43:09
- Label: Thermidor
- Producer: SPK

SPK chronology
Information Overload Unit (1981)	Leichenschrei (1982)	Machine Age Voodoo (1984)

Alternative cover
- 1992 CD reissue

Leichenschrei is the second album by the band SPK. It was released in 1982 on Thermidor Records in the United States and in 1983 on the band's own Side Effekts label in the United Kingdom. The title is a German word meaning "corpse scream", and might refer to an alleged supernatural behavior exhibited by the deceased.

The band was listed on the initial Thermidor release as "SPK", although subsequent vinyl reissues were credited to "Sozialistisches Patienten Kollektiv", a reference to the leftist German patients' group of the same name. The name was misspelled on the CD reissue as "Socialistisches Patienten Kollektiv".

== Legacy ==
In a 1987 interview for Italian fanzine Snowdonia, Edward Ka-Spel of The Legendary Pink Dots stated that he thought industrial music should have stopped after Leichenschrei, describing it as a "brilliant album" and "nobody could make a better, more definitive work in industrial music".

== Track listing ==
No track listing was provided with the initial release on Thermidor Records. The first side of vinyl editions of the album end with a lockgroove. Sides one and two of the vinyl editions are labeled "Seite ((Lysso))" and "Seite ((Klono))", respectively.

=== Side one ===
1. "Genetic Transmission" – 3:17
2. "Post-Mortem" – 2:24
3. "Desolation" – 1:18
4. "Napalm (Terminal Patient)" – 2:39
5. "Cry from the Sanatorium" – 2:26
6. "Baby Blue Eyes" – 2:38
7. "Israel" – 2:46
8. "Internal Bleeding" – 1:46
9. "Chamber Music" – 3:26

=== Side two ===
1. "Despair" – 4:45
2. "The Agony of the Plasma" – 3:03
3. "Day of Pigs" – 4:18
4. "Wars of Islam" – 4:31
5. "Maladia Europa (The European Sickness)" – 3:50

== Personnel ==
According to the album liner notes:

- Oblivion (Graeme Revell) – synthesizer, electronic rhythms, tape, syncussion, vocals
- NE/H/IL (Neil Hill) – synthesizer, electronic rhythms, tape, treatments, vocals
- James Pinker – drums, syncussion, metal percussion, backing vocals
- Paul Charlier – guitar, bass, synthi
- Peter Kennard – guitar, bass
- Karel van Bergen – violin, vocals
- Sinan Leong – vocals, photography
- Brett Guerim – additional vocals
- Margaret Hill – additional vocals
- Lustmord – additional vocals
- Rose – additional vocals
- Phil Punch – mixing

== Charts ==
Chart (1983)	Peak position
UK Indie Chart	14

== Release history ==
Region	Date	Label	Format	Catalog
United States	1982	Thermidor Records	LP	T-9
United Kingdom	1983	Side Effekts	LP	SER 02
Germany	1986	Normal Records	LP	NORMAL 26
United Kingdom	1992	The Grey Area	CD	SPK 2CD
