= USS Threadfin =

Submarine of the United States

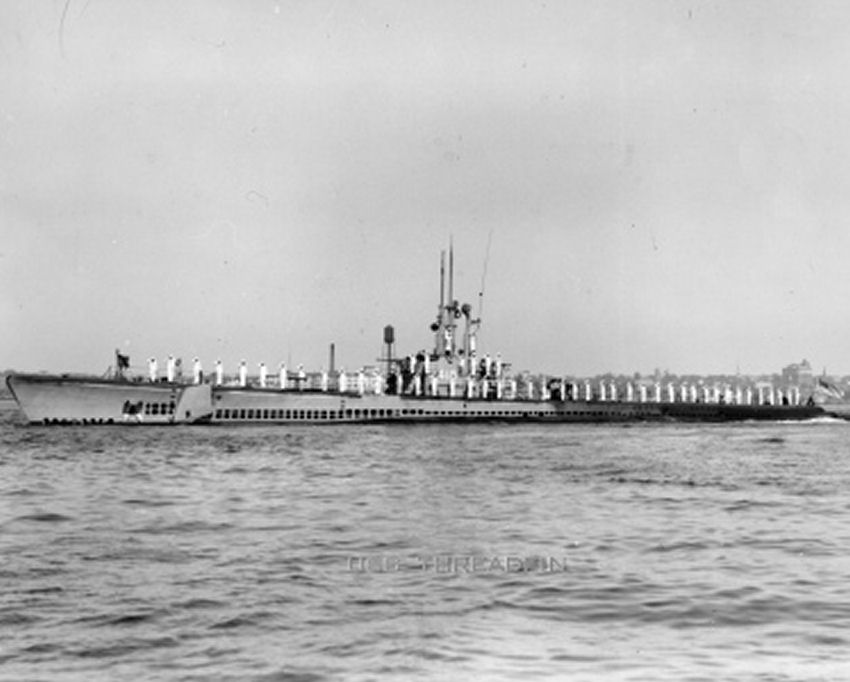
- Threadfin's sailors line the deck, possibly at the naval base at Staten Island, N.Y., 22 September 1945.

History

United States
- Name: USS Threadfin (SS-410)
- Builder: Portsmouth Naval Shipyard, Kittery, Maine
- Laid down: 18 March 1944
- Launched: 26 June 1944
- Commissioned: 30 August 1944
- Decommissioned: 10 December 1952
- Recommissioned: 7 August 1953
- Decommissioned: 18 August 1972
- Stricken: 1 August 1973
- Fate: Transferred to Turkey, 18 August 1972, sold to Turkey 1 August 1973

Turkey
- Name: TCG 1. İnonu (S 346)
- Namesake: First Battle of İnönü, And İsmet İnönü
- Acquired: 18 August 1972

General characteristics (As completed)
- Class & type: Balao-class diesel-electric submarine
- Displacement: 1,526 tons (1,550 t) surfaced; 2,401 tons (2,440 t) submerged
- Length: 311 ft 8 in (95.00 m)
- Beam: 27 ft 3 in (8.31 m)
- Draft: 16 ft 10 in (5.13 m) maximum
- Propulsion: 4 × Fairbanks-Morse Model 38D8-⅛ 10-cylinder opposed piston diesel engines driving electrical generators; 2 × 126-cell Sargo batteries; 2 × low-speed direct-drive Elliott electric motors; two propellers; 5,400 shp (4.0 MW) surfaced; 2,740 shp (2.0 MW) submerged
- Speed: 20.25 knots (38 km/h) surfaced; 8.75 knots (16 km/h) submerged
- Range: 11,000 nautical miles (20,000 km) surfaced at 10 knots (19 km/h)
- Endurance: 48 hours at 2 knots (3.7 km/h) submerged; 75 days on patrol
- Test depth: 400 ft (120 m)
- Complement: 10 officers, 70–71 enlisted
- Armament: 10 × 21-inch (533 mm) torpedo tubes; 6 forward, 4 aft; 24 torpedoes; 1 × 5-inch (127 mm) / 25 caliber deck gun; Bofors 40 mm and Oerlikon 20 mm cannon

General characteristics (Guppy IIA)
- Class & type: none
- Displacement: 1,848 tons (1,878 t) surfaced; 2,440 tons (2,479 t) submerged
- Length: 307 ft (94 m)
- Beam: 27 ft 4 in (8.33 m)
- Draft: 17 ft (5.2 m)
- Propulsion: Snorkel added; One diesel engine and generator removed; Batteries upgraded to Sargo II
- Speed: Surfaced: 17.0 knots (19.6 mph; 31.5 km/h) maximum; 13.5 knots (15.5 mph; 25.0 km/h) cruising; Submerged: 14.1 knots (16.2 mph; 26.1 km/h) for ½ hour; 8.0 knots (9.2 mph; 14.8 km/h) snorkeling; 3.0 knots (3.5 mph; 5.6 km/h) cruising
- Armament: 10 × 21 inch (533 mm) torpedo tubes; (six forward, four aft); all guns removed

USS Threadfin (SS-410), a Balao-class submarine, was the only vessel of the United States Navy to be named for the threadfin.

Threadfin was laid down on 18 March 1944 at the Portsmouth Navy Yard in Kittery, Maine. She was launched on 26 June 1944 sponsored by Mrs. Frank G. Fox, and commissioned on 30 August 1944.

Training and trials out of Portsmouth followed her final completion late in September. After transiting the Panama Canal in mid-November, the submarine reached Pearl Harbor early in December and conducted intensive training in preparation for her first war patrol.

== First war patrol ==
Threadfin stood out of Pearl Harbor on 25 December. Early in January 1945, she reached her assigned patrol area in the waters just south of Kyūshū. There, she spent 30 of her 54 days at sea. She encountered numerous enemy aircraft, patrol craft, and fishing vessels, but only six targets worthy of a torpedo.

On 30 January, Threadfin sighted a large enemy patrol craft, but prudently allowed her to pass unmolested in the hope of drawing a bead on any merchant vessels for which she might be running interference. Presently, a 2000-ton coastal freighter escorted by two patrol vessels and a plane crossed her path. Threadfin fired a spread of six torpedoes from a range of about 2,900 yards (2,700 m). At least one of them struck home, obscuring the target in smoke and steam. The cargoman probably sank; but Threadfin could not verify that result visually because the escorts drove her deep with a persistent, though ineffective, depth charge attack.

Two days later, the submarine encountered a Japanese Ro-60-class submarine. However, the enemy's course changes kept Threadfin from gaining an advantageous attack setup, and the Japanese "pig-boat" disappeared in the distance. Threadfin next happened upon two freighters escorted by three patrol craft. This time, the small convoy's position close inshore defied the American submarine's efforts to attack.

The following day, she mistook another patrol vessel for a cargo ship and discovered her mistake in just enough time to make a deep dive to safety. That escapade also robbed her of a chance at a small convoy consisting of two small cargomen and two escorts. She sighted the convoy later when she returned to periscope depth; but, by then the ships had passed out of range. A week later, she launched six torpedoes at a minesweeper 2,500 yards (2,300 m) distant. In spite of an excellent fire-control solution, all six missed. They apparently ran too deeply. Three days later, she concluded a somewhat discouraging, but still successful, first war patrol at Midway Island.

== Second war patrol ==
Following a month there for refit and training, Threadfin embarked upon her second war patrol on 14 March. She initially joined a coordinated attack group composed of herself, and submarines Sea Dog and Trigger. During her five-day tour with that wolf pack, Threadfin made two attacks on enemy shipping. On the afternoon of 28 March, she came across two Japanese destroyer escort-type warships and apparently dispatched one with a single hit from a spread of six torpedoes. The stricken warship's screws stopped while her colleague's depth charge attack deprived Threadfin of definite knowledge of the ultimate result. That evening, the submarine tangled with a convoy composed of two small trawlers and four luggers. During the ensuing surface gun engagement, the submarine inflicted serious damage on two of the luggers, moderate damage on the trawlers, and minor damage on the remaining pair of luggers. Though disconcerting, the Japanese return fire proved ineffectual.

On 31 March, that group was dissolved, and Threadfin received orders to join Hackleback and Silversides near Bungo Suido, the primary entrance to the Seto Inland Sea which separates Honshū from Kyūshū and Shikoku. The new attack group's primary assignment was to guard against an undetected sortie of the remainder of Japan's fleet during the Allied assault on Okinawa. On the evening of 6 April, Threadfin made radar contact with what later proved to be an enemy task force built around Japan's super battleship, Yamato. Passing up a tempting opportunity in order to carry out her prime directive, Threadfin flashed the warning to Fifth Fleet headquarters afloat off Okinawa.

Completing that phase of her mission, the submarine tried desperately to regain attack position on the force, but its speed denied her a second chance. On the whole, however, her radio was probably more valuable than her torpedoes would have been. Her timely warning enabled the planes of Task Force 58 to ambush and sink Yamato and to destroy most of her consorts as well.

A second mission of the submarine consisted of lifeguard duty to rescue downed American airmen. Her first war patrol afforded her no opportunity to pursue such a humane mission; but, near the end of the second she rescued a half-drowned P-51 Mustang pilot. Though he had swallowed large quantities of water, artificial respiration soon brought him around. That proved to be the last noteworthy event of the patrol; and, after a refueling stop at Midway on 30 April, Threadfin concluded her second war patrol at Pearl Harbor on 4 May.

== Third war patrol ==
At Pearl Harbor, she underwent refit followed by a brief four-day training period before departing on her third and final war patrol. She stopped briefly at Guam for voyage repairs; then continued on to her assigned area in the Yellow Sea and the East China Sea. She closed her first victim, a three-masted schooner, to inspect her and determine her nationality. Finding her to be enemy-operated and worthy of attack, the submarine opened up with her five-inch (127 mm) deck gun. Fifteen hits later, the schooner vanished beneath the waves. Threadfin rescued nine crewmen from the schooner and learned that her victim had been bound for Dairen laden with coal. The next day, the submarine encountered a freighter sunk in shallow water and surrounded by small boats, apparently conducting some variety of salvage operations. She fired a single torpedo which caused the wreck to settle a further ten feet and which she hoped would suspend the suspected salvage operations. Closer inspection, however, indicated that the boats were fishing, not conducting salvage operations.

Soon thereafter, Threadfin sighted a four-masted cargo schooner and sank her in a gun attack. The following afternoon, her deck gun accounted for another cargo schooner. On the 19th, she stopped a group of five two-masted cargo junks for inspection but allowed them to continue their voyage after identifying them as friendly Chinese. The next night, she made a surface radar torpedo attack on an enemy ship shrouded by heavy fog. She loosed a spread of five torpedoes, of which two found their mark. The target sank within five minutes without ever being visually sighted from Threadfin.

The submarine concluded her offensive operations near the Strait of Tsushima. After a day of submerged patrolling without sighting a worthwhile target, she received word that night that submarine Sea Robin had come upon a patrol craft heading north and four small cargomen heading south. While Sea Robin took on the patrol craft, Threadfin hit the small convoy. During the ensuing night gun action, she sank two of the four tiny merchantmen and forced the other two into Sea Robin's path. The two American submarines dispatched all four. On the return trip from her final war patrol, Threadfin rescued three survivors from a downed American flying boat and took them to Guam where she arrived on 27 July.

== Post-war activities ==
From 27 July to 12 August, the submarine refitted at Guam in preparation for her fourth war patrol, but that patrol never occurred. While she conducted post-refit training, the Japanese capitulation ended hostilities. On 18 August, she got underway from Guam to return to the United States. She transited the Panama Canal on 16 September and reported for duty with the Atlantic Fleet. Six days later, she tied up at the naval base at Staten Island, New York.

The balance of Threadfin's 28-year career proved to be routine in nature. Initially, she operated out of New London, Connecticut, serving as a training platform for the officers and men learning the ropes at the Submarine School. That duty apparently lasted until December 1952, at which time the submarine was decommissioned to enter the Portsmouth Naval Shipyard for an extended conversion overhaul.

Over the next eight months, Threadfin received extensive modifications in an effort to make her more effective in underwater operations—more truly a submarine than simply a submersible. When she emerged from the shipyard the following summer, her hull had been streamlined and her sail modified. In addition, she lost one of her four diesel engines to make room for auxiliary equipment displaced by an expanded sonar facility. Finally, her underwater performance was boosted by the installation of two "greater capacity" batteries—they actually produced the same power as the old style batteries but in a smaller, lighter physical plant—and a snorkel for extended submerged cruising.

At the completion of her Greater Underwater Propulsion Power Program (GUPPY) conversion, Threadfin was recommissioned at Portsmouth on 7 August 1953. In October, she conducted her post-conversion shakedown cruise and, early the following month, reported for duty as a unit of Submarine Squadron 4 at Key West, Florida.

Over the remaining 19 years of her career, Threadfin operated off the East Coast. She participated in several exercises each year and frequently conducted summer training cruises for United States Naval Academy and NROTC midshipmen. Though based in Key West, she made visits to ports on the Gulf of Mexico such as New Orleans, Louisiana, and often ventured north to New London, Connecticut. In October 1962, she participated in President of the United States John F. Kennedy's quarantine of Cuba during the Cuban Missile Crisis. The following summer, the submarine made what, on the basis of sparse records, appears to be her only post-war overseas deployment with the Sixth Fleet in the Mediterranean Sea. Actually, Threadfin made two 6th Fleet deployments of about 4 months each in 1970 and 1972. At the end of the 1972 deployment she was loaned to Turkey and did not return to the USA. The turnover occurred in Izmir.

== Turkish Navy service ==
After successive years of routine operations in the Caribbean Sea and Atlantic Ocean, Threadfin was placed out of commission on 18 August 1972 and transferred to Turkey that same day. She served in the Turkish Navy, on loan, as TCG Birinci İnönü (S346) ("First Inonu") until the following summer. She was the third submarine of that name and commemorated the Turkish victory at the First Battle of İnönü in January 1921. On 1 August 1973, her name was struck from the American Naval Vessel Register. Two weeks later, the loan expired, she was returned to the United States Navy, and sold to Turkey. In mid-1998 she was still in active service in the Turkish Navy. She has reportedly been decommissioned since then.

== Honors and awards ==
Threadfin was awarded three battle stars for World War II service.
