= SPK =

SPK may refer to:

- SPK (band), Australia
- SPK, Soviet cosmonaut maneuvering unit
- Simultaneous pancreas-kidney transplant, a type of pancreas transplantation
- Socialist Patients' Collective (German: Sozialistisches Patientenkollektiv)
- Postal code for Spinola Park, St. Julian's, Malta
- Stiftung Preußischer Kulturbesitz, the Prussian Cultural Heritage Foundation
- Strategic Plan Campine (Dutch: Strategisch Plan Kempen)
- Sutton Parkway railway station's station code
