= USS Silversides (SSGN-807) =

US Navy Virginia-class submarine

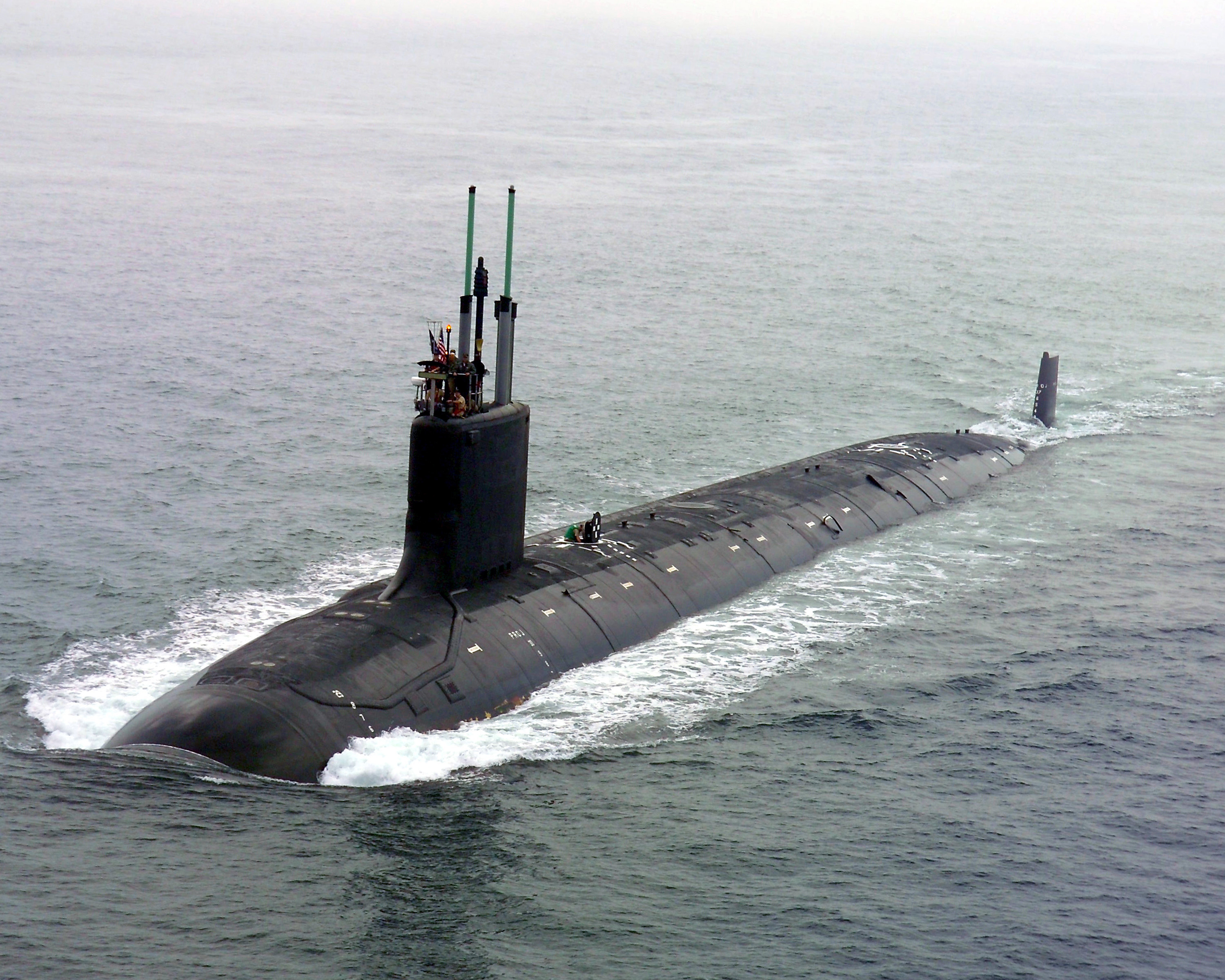
- The lead boat of the Virginia class, USS Virginia (SSN-774).

History

United States
- Name: Silversides
- Namesake: Silversides
- Ordered: 2 December 2019
- Builder: Newport News Shipbuilding, Newport News, Virginia
- Identification: Hull number: SSGN-807
- Status: Under construction

General characteristics
- Class & type: Virginia-class submarine
- Displacement: 10,200 tons
- Length: 460 ft (140 m)
- Beam: 34 ft (10.4 m)
- Draft: 32 ft (9.8 m)
- Propulsion: S9G reactor auxiliary diesel engine
- Speed: 25 knots (46 km/h; 29 mph)
- Endurance: can remain submerged for periods in excess of 3 months
- Test depth: greater than 800 ft (244 m)
- Complement: 15 officers; 120 enlisted
- Armament: 40 VLS tubes (12 forward VPT; 28 in VPM), four 21 in (533 mm) torpedo tubes for Mk-48 torpedoes BGM-109 Tomahawk

USS Silversides (SSGN-807) will be a Virginia-class submarine for the United States Navy.

It will be the third submarine to bear the name, beginning with the World War II-era USS Silversides (SS-236). It was ordered on 2 December 2019. Secretary of the Navy Kenneth Braithwaite announced the name on 15 January 2021 during a visit to the USS Constitution.

Silversides will be part of the Virginia class's Block V, which incorporates previously introduced modifications to the base design. Among these is a Virginia Payload Module, a hull segment with four vertical launch tubes. Each tube can carry seven Tomahawk strike missiles, increasing the submarine's missile armament to 40.
