= Jessica Rosemary Shepherd =

British painter

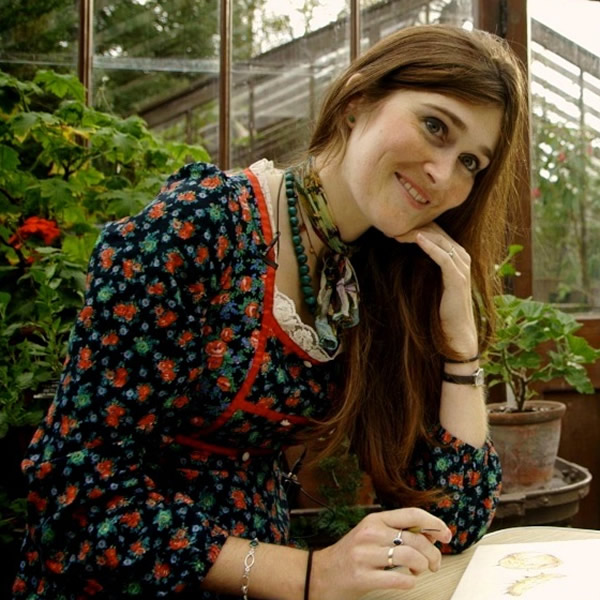
- Shepherd in 2014
- Born: October 1984 (age 41)
- Other names: Inky Leaves, Úrsula Romero
- Occupation: Artist

Jessica Rosemary Shepherd FLS (born October 1984) is an English painter, artist and publisher who works under the names of Úrsula Romero and Inky Leaves.

== Early career ==
After attending Steyning Grammar School, Shepherd studied for a BSc in botany at Plymouth University and was awarded the Eden Project Prize for her thesis in which she initiated the restoration of Plymouth's historic Drakes Place Gardens. During her time at university Shepherd dedicated time to researching and cataloguing the 19th Century Thomas Bruges Flower (1817–1899) herbarium at Plymouth City Museum and Art Gallery alongside her studies.

After graduating from Plymouth University, she secured a NERC funded grant to study for a MSc in Botanical Taxonomy at University of Edinburgh and graduated with a distinction after studying the Cytology of Campanula rotundifolia for her thesis.

Following her attendance at Edinburgh Shepherd was funded by the Esmée Fairbairn Foundation to conduct two years of research into the 18th Century St. Aubyn (1758–1839) herbarium and mineral collection at Plymouth City Museum. Meanwhile she was also employed by the University to continue her work on improving the campus and was the curator of the Muirhead Herbarium.

In 2010 Shepherd was employed by the Royal Botanic Gardens, Kew and was positioned in the Shirley Sherwood Gallery of Botanical Art. During this time she freelanced as an illustrator for scientific journals and books whilst developing her own painting techniques and delivered several talks about the Marianne North Gallery.

She was elected Fellow of the Linnean Society of London in 2012 and was elected as a member of the Chelsea Physic Garden Florilegium Society in 2013 and a member of the Chelsea Arts Club in 2017.

== Career ==
Shepherd's paintings feature in the Shirley Sherwood Collection, the Fitzwilliam Museum and National Botanic Gardens (Ireland). Her work has been featured in a number of exhibitions. In 2014, she was featured on the BBC4 documentary "In Search of Rory McEwen" where she demonstrated how to paint on vellum in the Chelsea Physic Garden.

On 16 February 2017 Shepherd held her first solo exhibition at Abbott and Holder in London and in conjunction published her first book titled ‘Leafscape’ featuring her collection of watercolour paintings on leaves. For the collection, Shepherd worked in collaboration with musician Hoodlum Priest (Derek Thompson) to produce a soundtrack which was released by Concrete Music Publishing.

In late 2017, inspired by Novalis' unfinished Bildungsroman 'Heinrich von Ofterdingen', Shepherd began her next project on the Blue Flower. This project culminated in the publication of a book 'Blaue Blume' which was published by Inky Leaves Publishing in 2026.

In 2018 Shepherd launched INK Quarterly (INKQ) – a collaborative art publication that acts as a stage for thinkers and artists to talk freely about their ideas and practice for an educated audience. 2018 also saw the birth of the Inky Leaves podcasting channel which, via a series of talks and interviews, discusses and promotes botanical art.

== Personal life ==
Shepherd was a model and muse for well known ceramic artist, printmaker and painter Eric James Mellon between 2004 and 2006, frequently appearing in his work wearing hats. She has also been a model for other well known artists including Piers Ottey, Gym Hamala and Youth and spent a year studying the history of painting under the tuition of YBA artist Nick Fudge.. She is the daughter of internationally recognised British studio potter and ceramic artist Kitty Shepherd.

== Exhibitions ==
- May 2026 - 'Monumental Botanical Art', Shirley Sherwood Gallery of Botanical Art, Royal Botanic Gardens Kew, London, UK
- May 2026 - 'Ellas ilustran botánica', Centro de Arte y Naturaleza Fundación Beulas, Huesca, Spain
- October 2024 - 'Expressions in Blue', Shirley Sherwood Gallery of Botanical Art, Royal Botanic Gardens Kew, London, UK
- January 2024 'Rory McEwen - A New Perspective on Nature', USA tour
- July 2023 - 'Beauty in Individualism - Collection of works by women artists of the 20th and 21st Centuries', Stephen Ongpin Fine Art, London, UK
- February 2022 - 'Ellas ilustran botánica', Casa de las Ciencias, Spain
- May 2021 - 'The Botanical Rainbow', Shirley Sherwood Gallery of Botanical Art, Royal Botanic Gardens Kew, London, UK
- January 2020 - 'Herbarios Imaginados', Centro de Arte Complutense, Spain
- August 2019 - Het Spaanse Dorp: Polopos TV show and art festival, Granada, Spain
- July 2019 - The Long Gallery, Salamanca Arts Centre, Hobart, Tasmania, Australia
- May 2019 - Nazari Garden, group exhibition with painters Gareth Lister and Nick Fudge, Spain
- October 2017 – International Watercolour Festival, Moscow, Russia
- February 2017 – Leafscape, Abbott and Holder, London, UK
- July 2015 – The Incredible Exploding Pomegranate, Granada, Spain
- May 2014 – Aibítir, Dublin, Ireland
- April 2014 - RHS Botanical Art Show, London, UK
- May 2013 – Natural Selection, Espacio Gallery, London, UK
- April 2009 – Darwin to Digital, Cube³ Gallery, Plymouth, UK

== Sound ==
- Thompson, D. and Shepherd, J. R. (2017) Leafscape [CD], Concrete Music Publishing, UK

== Publications ==
- Shepherd, J. R. (2017) Leafscape [Hardback], Inky Leaves Publishing, Chichester, UK. ISBN 9781788086660
- Shepherd, J. R. (2026) Blaue Blume [Hardback], Inky Leaves Publishing, Granada, Spain. ISBN 9781036971786

=== Illustrations by Shepherd ===
- Patel Ellis, S. (2018) The Botanical Bible, William Collins-Harper. London, UK. pp. 320–321. ISBN 978-0008262273
- Wendell, B. (2018) L’unico mondo che abbiamo, Piano B edizioni, Prato, Italy. ISBN 9788893710329 (front cover)
- Morris, H. (2013) Tree Pruning: A Modern Approach, International Dendrology Society Yearbook, pp. 209–229
- Thurstan, M. and Martin, R. (2012) Exotic Botanical Illustration with the Eden Project, Batsford Ltd. ISBN 9781849940313
- Morris, H. (2011) Tree Pruning: A Short History, International Dendrology Society Yearbook 2010, pp. 217–225

=== Essays ===
- Shepherd, J. R. (2018) INK Quarterly, Inky Leaves Publishing (editorial)
- Shepherd, J. R. (2009) Bringing a Herbarium to Life at Plymouth City Museum and Art Gallery, NatSCA News, Issue 17, pp. 43–51
- Shepherd, J. R. (2009) The Collector, Geoscientist, Vol. 19, No. 12, pp. 6–9
- Shepherd, J. R. (2009) St. Aubyn Mineral Collection (c 1794–2010) at Plymouth City Museum and Art Gallery, Geological Curator, Vol.9, No. 2, pp. 45–56
