= Machine Age Voodoo =

Studio album by SPK
- Released: 30 November 1984
- Recorded: 1983–1984
- Studios: EMI Studios 301 (Sydney, Australia)
- Genres: Synth-pop; industrial; EBM; dark wave
- Length: 40:38
- Labels: WEA; Elektra
- Producer: Graeme Revell

SPK chronology
Leichenschrei (1982)	Machine Age Voodoo (1984)	Zamia Lehmanni: Songs of Byzantine Flowers (1986)

Singles from Machine Age Voodoo
- 1. "Metal Dance" Released: 1983; 2. "Junk Funk" Released: September 1984

Professional ratings
Review scores
Source	Rating
AllMusic	4/5 stars
Smash Hits	5/10

Machine Age Voodoo is the third studio album by the Australian industrial band SPK, released on 30 November 1984 by WEA Records. It was first released outside the United States until 1985 when it was released by Elektra Records. Produced by Graeme Revell, the album is a radical departure from the band's previous material, leaning more towards synth-pop and dance-rock, rather than industrial music. It is the band's first studio album to feature Sinan Leong as lead vocalist.

Two singles from Machine Age Voodoo were released, "Metal Dance" and "Junk Funk", of which the latter was later renamed to "Machine Age Voodoo" on the US release of the album.

== Track listing ==
All tracks are written by Graeme Revell and Sinan Leong.

Side one
No.	Title	Length
1.	"Junk Funk"	4:04
2.	"With Love from China"	5:46
3.	"High Tension"	4:27
4.	"One World"	4:27

Side two
No.	Title	Length
5.	"Flesh & Steel"	5:23
6.	"Metropolis"	4:24
7.	"Metal Dance"	3:39
8.	"Thin Ice"	3:41
9.	"Crime of Passion"	4:47
Total length:		40:38

Additional track on US Version
No.	Title	Length
8.	"Seduction"	4:25

== Credits and personnel ==
Credits adapted from the album's liner notes.

Personnel

- Graeme Revell – producer, arrangements, all instruments
- Sinan Leong – vocals
- Jeff Bartolomei – additional keyboards
- Mary Bradfield-Taylor – additional vocals
- Graham Jesse – saxophone
- James Kelly – guitar
- Sam McNally – additional keyboards
- Phil Scorgie – bass, keyboards

Production

- Christo Curtis – engineer
- Tony Taurins – mastering

Design

- Carol Friedman – art direction
- JoDee Stringham – design
- Nelson Leong – logo design
- Peter Ashworth – photography
- Comme des Garçons – clothes
- Judy Blame – jewelry
- Lynne Easton – make-up
- Miss Moss – photomontage
- Iain R. Webb – stylist
