= USS Silversides =

Three submarines of the United States Navy have been named USS Silversides, for the silversides, a small fish marked with a silvery stripe along each side of its body.

- USS Silversides (SS-236) was a Gato-class submarine that served during World War II. Now a museum ship in Muskegon, Michigan
- USS Silversides (SSN-679) was a Sturgeon-class submarine, served during the Cold War.
- USS Silversides (SSN-807), a planned Virginia-class submarine
