= Information Overload Unit =

Studio album by SPK
- Released: April 1981
- Recorded: 1979–1980, in London
- Genre: Industrial, noise
- Length: 41:42
- Label: Side Effects (original album)
- Producer: SPK

SPK chronology
Meat Processing Section 7" (1980)	Information Overload Unit (1981)	Leichenschrei (1982)

Professional ratings
Review scores
Source	Rating
Allmusic	2.5/5 stars

Information Overload Unit is the 1981 debut full-length album by the Australian industrial band SPK. Originally released in 1981 by Side Effects, it was re-released twice; in 1985 by Normal, and in 1992 by The Grey Area.

== Track listing ==
=== Side A (aka Face ULTRA) ===
1. "Emanation Machine R. Gie 1916" – 5:24
2. "Suture Obsession" – 5:06
3. "Macht Schrecken" – 5:19
4. "Beruftverböt" – 5:31

=== Side B (aka Face HYPER) ===
1. "Ground Zero: Infinity Dose" – 4:18
2. "Stammheim Torturkammer" – 4:33
3. "Retard" – 4:26
4. "Epilept: Convulse" – 2:33
5. "Kaltbruchig Acideath" – 4:32

== Personnel ==
According to the band's official website

- Operator - synthesizers, rhythms, treatments, vocals
- Mike Wilkins - guitar, bass, tapes, vocals
- Tone Generator (Dominic Guerin) - synthesizers, treatments
- Mr. Clean (Ashley Revell) - technician

== Release history ==
Region	Date	Label	Format	Catalog
United Kingdom	1981	Side Effects	LP	SER 01
Germany	1985	Normal	LP	Normal 9
United Kingdom	1991	Side Effects	LP	SER 01
United Kingdom	1992	Mute/The Grey Area	CD	SPK 1CD
