= Hoodlum Priest (musician) =

English musician

Background information
- Also known as: Technietzsche; Surfers For Satan; Komuso
- Born: Derek Thompson
- Origin: London, England
- Genres: Industrial, trip hop, classical, drum and bass
- Occupations: Programmer, remixer, record producer
- Instruments: Guitar, bass guitar, keyboards, trumpet
- Years active: 1989–present
- Labels: ZTT Records (1989–1994); Concrete Productions (1994–1998); Iris Light Records (1998-2000)
- Members: Derek Thompson (1989–present)
- Past members: Paul Sevier (1990–1990;vocals)
- Website: www.hoodlumpriest.net

Named after a 1960s movie, Hoodlum Priest is a name used by producer/multi instrumentalist and composer Derek Thompson, born of an Irish background but born and raised in London. The name later became his self-chosen moniker for his work as a producer and engineer, using hip-hop, industrial, and techno influences as the source of material for his sounds.

== Biography ==
Often known for being an eccentric in interviews, he claimed to have been kicked out of the Maynooth Seminary after producing a thesis proving that the Devil did in fact have "all the best tunes" and later retiring from full-time employment at the age of 22. His first major musical background through the late 1970s and 1980s was with avant-garde industrialists SPK, and he played a variety of instruments including bass, keyboards and the trumpet. He departed after founder member Graeme Revell took the group to what Thompson felt was too commercial of a direction. After leaving SPK, Thompson had done a very brief stint with the Cure (a position he got after apparently meeting Robert Smith in a bar who apparently asked him what colour was his bass guitar and Derek replied 'Black'). He only played one show with The Cure, which was The Oxford Road Show in April, 1983. He later joined Jeffrey Lee Pierce's band The Gun Club, as a touring guitarist around 1985.

=== With Hoodlum Priest ===
His initial goal with Hoodlum Priest, one of the musical projects he explored during the 1990s, was to draw in both film influences on his work—primarily via dialogue but also musically—and hip-hop by recruiting a London-based MC. He was introduced to rapper Paul Sevier, previously known as Junior Gee, (under this moniker he won the London Rapping Championships and appeared on a handful of singles throughout 1983 and 1985) at a club performance in 1989. When he was offered a contract by ZTT after being featured on the License To Thrill soundtrack, the two worked together on the album The Heart of Darkness. Sevier's apparent strong Christian background and Thompson's more free-thinking philosophy and darker musical approach eventually led to the MC's departure. Soon after the release of The Heart of Darkness, ZTT inked a new international distribution agreement with Warner Bros. The album was deleted almost immediately by request of Warner Bros's Legal Department, concerned at the amount of uncleared samples included on the release.

The band was dropped by ZTT after disagreements over the label's refusal to release a controversial song called 'Cop Killer' and Thompson's opinion the label did not know how to promote the band. Thompson continued on his own, working on various sideprojects and interspersing his background work (occasionally with regular friend/callobrator Cliff Hewitt, a short-lived band called Black Radio and providing music for Television commercial) and continued to release occasional album releases such as 1994's Beneath the Pavement (which featured 2 tracks produced by Raymond Watts of KMFDM fame) and 1998's Hoodlum Priest, which featured former Gaye Bykers on Acid frontman and Pigface/Apollo 440 bandmember Mary Byker on vocals. After the release of the self-titled album, the group has been on hiatus. Recently, Derek became a member of Brighton's experimental music collective Spirit of Gravity and was last seen gigging as Komuso, which he described as an improvised unit, which featured guests who were given no information what to play on arrival to the stage.

His last known Hoodlum Priest recording was "Blood on the Moon" for the closing credits of the Danish film The King is Alive directed by Kristian Levring.

Later works have appeared under his real name. He was commissioned by Jessica Rosemary Shepherd to compose "Leafscape" - an arrangement that merges electronic sounds with Jessica Shepherd's field recordings. The piece was composed to be played with her collection of 42 leaf paintings at Abbott and Holder and was released by Concrete Music Publishing for Inky Leaves Publishing as a limited edition CD. In 2018, he was commissioned to create "Black lux" in tribute to the 50th anniversary of the cinematic release of Stanley Kubrick's 2001: A Space Odyssey for INKQ magazine.

=== "Cop Killer" controversy ===
Thompson created a track entitled "Cop Killer" (not related to the Body Count song "Copkiller"); ZTT refused to release it because of the heavy use of various 'cop killer' samples (most notably from movies such as RoboCop; it took two years to collect most of the samples) and concern that the song could cause an uproar. Both this song and the single "Caucasian" were banned, although some white labels of the records do exist.

== Discography ==
- The Heart of Darkness 1990
- Beneath the Pavement... 1994
- Hoodlum Priest 1998

=== Remixes ===
- Fatman (The Hoodlum Priest Fatboy Mix) and Menofearthereaper (The Concrete No Fee No Fear Mix) by Pop Will Eat Itself - Two Fingers My Friends! (1995)
- Reaper (Hoodlum Priest Remix) by Apollo 440 - (Don't Fear) The Reaper (1995)
- Father Cannot Yell (Pete Shelley/Black Radio Mix) (with Pete Shelley as part of Black Radio) by Can- Sacrilege (1997)
- Glömd (Mercedes Cortina Mix) (also 2 other remixes of the song with Sly Diva) by Koop- Glömd (The Mixes) (1997)
- Chickenbone (Surfers For Satan mix) and You (Hoodlum Priest mix) by LK- Chickenbone single (1997)
- Rubycon Revisited by Tangerine Dream- Rubycon Revisted (?)
- Leafscape ambient soundtrack arranged in collaboration with Jessica Rosemary Shepherd (2017)

=== Other appearances ===
- 'Metal Dance' 12" (percussion, trumpet, keyboards) by SPK 1983
- Maldoror Ceases to Exist on the Dogs Blood Order album.
- 'Sportster' on Spike (Works From B.E.A.S.T. - Volume 1)

== Miscellanea ==
- The album Beneath The Pavement.. was limited to 1200 copies.
- Thomson is apparently obsessed with surfing and started a 'British surf band' named Surfers for Satan. To continue his fascination with surfing, he added music to a little known cult surf movie named Pete And Deadly. He also starred alongside Pete Lee Wilson in this movie.
- Deep Dance accompanied the opening sequence of the 1991 Neil Pryde windsurfing movie Instant Replay.
