= Beneath the Pavement... =

Studio album by Hoodlum Priest
- Released: 1994
- Genre: Industrial, techno
- Label: Concrete Productions

Hoodlum Priest chronology
The Heart of Darkness (1990)	Beneath the Pavement... (1994)	Hoodlum Priest (1998)

Professional ratings
Review scores
Source	Rating
Allmusic	4.5/5 stars

Beneath the Pavement... is the second album by Hoodlum Priest. Released as an EP, it was only limited to 1200 copies, and is very hard to find. This album is somewhat different from the debut as it has no more rapping, featuring a more trip hop influenced element. Some of the tracks was produced by Raymond Watts of KMFDM fame, Howard Gray Of Apollo 440 and even Harley Davidson. due to the controversy that surrounded Caucasian's B-side Cop Killer a new version which was made and Derek said he apparently made 'on a night when two cops had been shot' was included in the song "Semtex Revolution".

The quote "And if your hardness will not glance and cut and chip to pieces, how can ye one day--create with me?For the creators are hard. And blessedness must it seem to you to press your hand upon millenniums as upon wax, Blessedness to write upon the will of millenniums as upon brass, harder than brass, nobler than brass. Entirely hard is only the noblest." inside the booklet are taken from the 29th entry of LVI. Old and New Tables in Friedrich Nietzsche's book Thus Spoke Zarathustra.

== Track listing ==
1. Rev.
2. Semtex Revolution
3. Radio K.I.L.L.
4. Scanning
5. Rev. (Roxy Mix)
6. Capital Of Pain
7. The Hammer Speaks

== Samples used ==
- "Capital of Pain"- samples taken from The Terminator and the television series Twin Peaks
- "Cop Killer"-samples taken from the films RoboCop, Colors and The Terminator.
- "Rev"-speech taken from the MC5 song "Ramblin' Rose", and the films If...., Taxi Driver and Total Recall. Main string sample taken from Dmitri Shostakovich's Symphony No.10.
