= The Heart of Darkness (album) =

Studio album by Hoodlum Priest
- Released: 1990
- Recorded: 1990
- Genres: Alternative rock, Techno
- Label: ZTT Records
- Producer: Derek Thompson

Hoodlum Priest chronology
| The Heart of Darkness (1990) | Beneath The Pavement... The Beach (1994) |

The Heart of Darkness is the debut album created by Hoodlum Priest. The album was minimally successful. It featured the first and only appearance of rapper Sevier, who left the band due to creative differences. During some time after the release of The Heart of Darkness, ZTT was bought out by Warner Bros, and the album was immediately deleted by request of Warner Bros's legal department. It was later re-released on the Hoodlum Priest website on 06/06/06. A remix of "Caucasian" entitled "Scanning" appeared on the follow-up Beneath The Pavement... The Beach.

== Track listing ==
1. "Introduction to the Heart of Darkness"
2. "Rock Drill"
3. "Tyrell"
4. "C Horse"
5. "Caucasian"
6. "Sex Spirit"
7. "The Walker" (CD and cassette only)
8. "Talk Dirty"
9. "Deep Dance"
10. "Rebel Angel"

== Samples used ==
- "Rock Drill" takes samples from the movies RoboCop and The Terminator.
- "Tyrell" takes samples from the film Blade Runner and Carmina Burana.
- "C Horse" samples the film Dune.
- "Caucasian" samples the main guitar from Jimi Hendrix's "Voodoo Chile (Slight Return)".
- "The Walker" samples The Terminator.
- "Rebel Angel" includes dialogue from the John Milton poem Paradise Lost and samples from Le Mystère des Voix Bulgares.
- "Talk Dirty" samples the film Dune and Hellraiser.
- "Deep Dance" samples the film Hellraiser and the trailer to the film From Beyond.
