= Below (film) =

2002 horror film directed by David Twohy

- Theatrical release poster
- Directed by: David Twohy
- Written by: Darren Aronofsky; Lucas Sussman; David Twohy
- Produced by: Darren Aronofsky; Sue Baden-Powell; Eric Watson
- Starring: Bruce Greenwood; Matthew Davis; Olivia Williams; Holt McCallany; Scott Foley; Zach Galifianakis; Jason Flemyng; Dexter Fletcher
- Cinematography: Ian Wilson
- Edited by: Martin Hunter
- Music by: Graeme Revell; Tim Simonec
- Production companies: Dimension Films; Protozoa Pictures
- Distributed by: Miramax Films
- Release date: October 11, 2002
- Running time: 105 minutes
- Country: United States
- Language: English
- Budget: $40 million
- Box office: $2.6 million

Below is a 2002 submarine supernatural horror film directed by David Twohy, written by Darren Aronofsky, Lucas Sussman and Twohy, and stars Bruce Greenwood, Olivia Williams, Matthew Davis, Holt McCallany, Scott Foley, Zach Galifianakis, Jason Flemyng and Dexter Fletcher. The film tells the story of a United States Navy submarine that experiences a series of supernatural events while on patrol in the Atlantic Ocean in 1943.

Initially intended as a historical sci-fi thriller, Twohy retooled the script into a horror following his success with Pitch Black. Below was shot on location in Lake Michigan for exteriors (using the World War II-era U.S. Navy submarine USS Silversides) and at Pinewood Studios.

Twohy refused to re-edit to get a PG-13 rating, so Dimension gave the film a limited theatrical release on October 11, 2002, with little advertising, resulting in earning only $605,562 in North America box office. It received mixed to positive reviews.

== Plot ==
In August 1943, the U.S. Navy submarine USS Tiger Shark patrols the Atlantic Ocean during World War II. Receiving orders to pick up survivors spotted adrift by a British PBY Catalina patrol plane, the submarine rescues three survivors – British nurse Claire Paige, and two men, one of them wounded – from British hospital ship Fort James, sunk two days earlier; one survivor blames a German U-boat he spotted on the surface just before Fort James suffered a torpedo hit. The Tiger Shark crew spots a German destroyer approaching. The submarine has several encounters with the destroyer and suffers damage from depth charges. Commanding officer Lieutenant Brice discovers the wounded survivor is actually a German prisoner-of-war, Bernhard Schillings. Believing Schillings has been making noise to betray Tiger Shark's position to the German warship, Brice confronts him, and when the German panics and grabs a scalpel to defend himself, Brice shoots him dead.

Brice reveals to Paige that Tiger Shark recently sank a German submarine tender, and previous commanding officer, Lieutenant Commander Winters, died after surfacing to confirm the sinking. According to Brice, Winters attempted to salvage a souvenir from the flotsam with a boathook when Tiger Shark struck a submerged object, causing Winters to fall overboard and drown; Brice then assumed command.

Following Schillings' death, those aboard Tiger Shark perceive disembodied voices and other eerie events. Working in a ballast tank, Ensign Douglas Odell questions Brice's account that Winters fell after the submarine struck a submerged object, saying that he felt no such impact. Lieutenant Steven Coors tells Odell another version of events: Winters, on deck with only Brice, Coors, and Lieutenant Paul Loomis, had ordered a gunnery party summoned to fire on the German survivors. When Brice, Loomis, and Coors objected, a heated argument escalated into a physical altercation during which Winters hit his head and fell overboard. To protect Winters' reputation, Coors asks Odell not to tell anyone. Before leaving the ballast tank, Coors dies in a mysterious accident.

A series of bizarre mechanical problems cause the crew to lose control of Tiger Shark, and the submarine turns back towards the site of her sinking of the German ship, apparently of her own volition, and the crew suspect a supernatural influence, questioning Brice's version of Winters' death. Crewmen die in accidents at an alarming rate; Loomis sees Winters' ghost, and tries to escape from the submarine via an escape trunk while the submarine is underwater, and dies when he is impaled on an outside railing.

Crew member "Weird" Wally concludes the submarine is haunted by a "malediction" that must be satisfied to escape its netherworld between heaven and hell. Paige and Odell discover that Tiger Shark mistook Fort James for the German submarine tender and sank the British ship; they also learn that Brice, Loomis, and Coors believed they could not afford this tragic mistake to appear on their records and conspired to suppress the story, killing Winters on the deck as he tried to save the survivors of Fort James.

Tiger Shark is crippled by mounting accidents, and only five survivors remain: Brice, Odell, Paige, Stumbo, and Wally. After Tiger Shark arrives at the location of the sinking of Fort James and surfaces in a disabled condition, those aboard detect a surface ship nearby. Brice prevents the surviving crew from radioing the ship, but Paige sneaks out on deck and tries to signal the ship with a flashlight. Brice confronts her and holds her at gunpoint. His remorse over the accident overcomes him, and he shoots himself in the head, falling dead into the ocean.

The ship Paige signals turns out to be British, and picks up the four survivors. Tiger Shark sinks, coming to rest on the ocean floor next to the wreck of Fort James.

== Cast ==
- Matthew Davis as Ensign Douglas Odell
- Bruce Greenwood as Lieutenant Brice
- Olivia Williams as Claire Paige
- Holt McCallany as Lieutenant Paul Loomis
- Scott Foley as Lieutenant Junior Grade Steven Coors
- Zach Galifianakis as Wally "Weird Wally"
- Jason Flemyng as Stumbo
- Dexter Fletcher as Kingsley
- Nick Chinlund as Chief
- Andrew Howard as Hoag
- Christopher Fairbank as Pappy
- Nick Hobbs as Lieutenant Commander Winters

== Production ==
In June 1998, following Darren Aronofsky's success on his debut film Pi, it was announced Miramax had signed Aronofsky to a pay-or-play deal of $600,000 to direct Proteus, a screenplay he wrote with Lucas Sussman. Proteus was described as a historical sci-fi thriller that takes place on an American submarine during World War II. Allies fleeing German U-boats find themselves dodging Nazi depth-charges dropped from above while an alien monster is attacking them from below. Prior to Miramax's pay-or-play deal, New Line Cinema had also been interested in acquiring Proteus.

In May 2000, David Twohy, following the sleeper hit of Pitch Black, was hired to direct and re-write Proteus with Aronofsky moving into a producer role. By this point in production, Proteus had dropped the sci-fi elements of the initial script and was instead reworked as a ghost story.

Dimension Films asked Twohy to re-edit to get a PG-13 rating; when Twohy refused, Dimension gave the film a limited theatrical release on October 11, 2002 with little advertising. The producers used USS Silversides, a retired World War II-era U.S. Navy Gato-class submarine that is now a museum ship in Muskegon, Michigan, for exteriors of the fictional USS Tiger Shark. The submarine was towed out into Lake Michigan for filming.

== Reception ==
Film review aggregator Rotten Tomatoes reported an approval rating of 66%, based on 70 reviews, with a rating average of 6.2/10. The site's critical consensus reads, "Below is a creepy, claustrophobic exercise in style." The website Metacritic gave the film a weighted average score of 55 out of 100, based on 20 critics, indicating "mixed reviews".

Entertainment Weekly gave the film a B+ rating, calling it a "handsome, haunting submarine thriller". Edward Guthmann from the San Francisco Chronicle gave a mainly negative review stating that the dialogue was "heavy on sarcasm and puncturing insults, never captures the World War II period but sounds ridiculously anachronistic". Variety gave the movie a mixed review stating that "the strenuous seriousness the film applies to an idea that is finally silly at its core steadily increases the impression of overwrought artificiality as matters progress".
