= Museum Street =

Street in Bloomsbury, Camden, England

Coordinates: 51°31′4″N 0°7′33″W

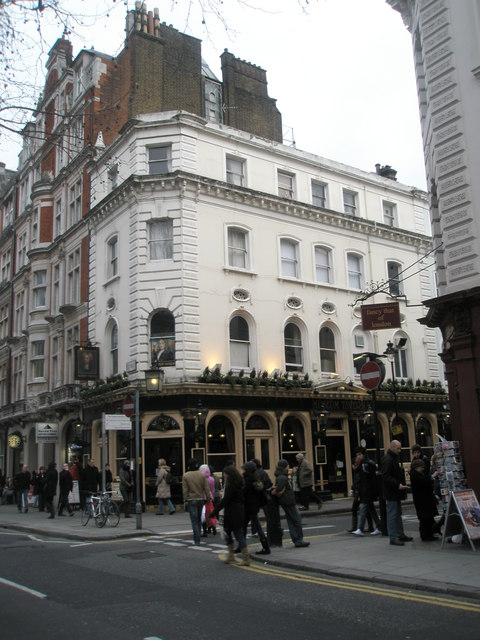
The corner of Great Russell Street and Museum Street.

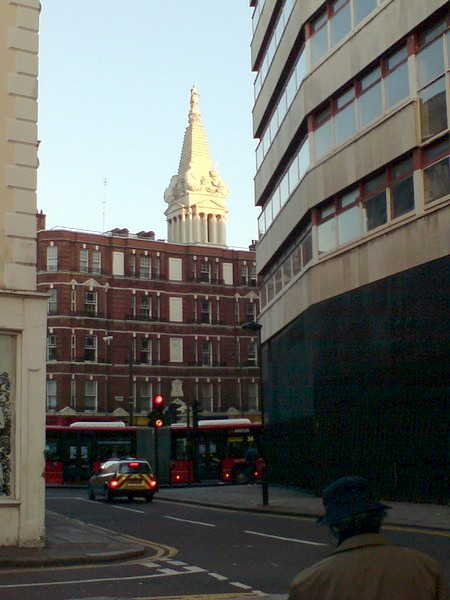
Looking north along Museum Street, towards New Oxford Street, with the steeple of St George's Church, Bloomsbury in the background.

Museum Street is a street in the Bloomsbury area of the London Borough of Camden, England. To the north is the British Museum, hence its current name. The street is populated by cafes and bookshops to appeal to the international museum-going public. To the north is Great Russell Street. To the south are Bloomsbury Way and New Oxford Street. The nearest tube stations are Tottenham Court Road and Holborn to the southwest and southeast respectively.

== History ==
The street goes back to the 14th century and beyond. It remained largely rural until the late 17th century when the growth of London caused its urbanization.

Known as a thoroughfare since records began, it soon came to be known as Peter Street . Later on, it became queens street. The origins of this name are unsure though scholars agree it is unlikely to have been an eminent Peter (notwithstanding perhaps St Peter) and more probable it derives from a saltpetre manufactory which is thought to have existed there long before the British Museum opened in the 1750s. During the early years the street was the site of hovels of slum tenements and rather unsavory characters such as pickpockets and prostitutes. An attempt at gentrification saw its name changed to Queen Street and it became home to parish schools to ensure the spiritual and secular education of poor children in London. Around this time Charles Mudie opened his bookshop and stationers here, he soon explored the possibility of lending books as well as selling them and Mudie's Select Library proved so popular that it moved out to larger premises after ten years. The street also became a rather fashionable area with many of the foremost writers of the day gathering in taverns to converse and debate. Charles Dickens drank here when he was dedicating his energy to amateur dramatics, John Keats, George Orwell and the Bloomsbury Set were also patrons.

On the corner of Great Russell Street at the northern end is the Museum Tavern, a public house that traces its origins back to 1723. From 1723 to 1762 the pub was called the Dog and Duck (so called because duck hunting was popular in the ponds in the Long Fields behind Montagu House in the 17th and 18th centuries). The occult Atlantis Bookshop was opened on the street in 1922.

More recent history has seen the street set up as a paragon for pedestrian access. Camden's 2003, Car Free Day saw the streetscape give right of way to foot passengers — a success which was heralded across Europe as an example of best practice in cutting vehicular noise and pollution.

Since 1987, number 30 has been home to the commercial art gallery Abbott and Holder.
