= SPK (band) =

Australian industrial and noise music group

- Also known as: SoliPsiK; SepPuKu; Surgical Penis Klinik; System Planning Korporation; Sozialistisches Patienten Kollektiv
- Origin: Sydney, Australia
- Genres: Industrial rock; noise rock; post-industrial; electronic rock; new wave; synth-rock; dark wave; neoclassical dark wave; dark ambient
- Years active: 1978–1988; 2025
- Labels: Side Effects; M Squared; Nettwerk; WEA; Industrial; Mute; Fresh Sounds; Regular; Thermidor
- Members: Graeme Revell; Robert Revell
- Past members: Neil Hill; Danny Rumour; David Virgin; Dominik Guerin; James Pinker; Karel van Bergen; John Murphy; Derek Thompson; Brian Williams; Sinan Leong; Jeff Bartolomei; Mary Bradfield-Taylor; Sam McNally; Jan Thornton; Karina Hayes; Paul Charlier; Kit Quarry

SPK are an industrial music group formed in Sydney, Australia in 1978. They are fronted by mainstay member, Graeme Revell, on keyboards and percussion. In 1980 the group traveled to the United Kingdom where they recorded their debut studio album, Information Overload Unit (1981).

According to Australian rock music historian Ian McFarlane, SPK were "at the forefront of the local post-punk, electronic/experimental movement of the late 1970s ... [their] music progressed from discordant, industrial-strength metal noise to sophisticated and restrained dance-rock with strange attributes".

In 1983, Sinan Leong joined on lead vocals, after which the group pursued a more commercial industrial dance style with the single "Junk Funk" and their third studio album, Machine Age Voodoo (1984). The group disbanded in 1988. Two years later Revell and Leong relocated to the United States, where Revell worked as a Hollywood film score composer.

In 2025, Revell reactivated SPK, performing two live shows in Europe with his son Robert. A "new entity", named SPKtR, is expected to begin touring in 2026.

== History ==
SPK was formed in 1978 in Sydney when New Zealand-born Graeme Revell (a.k.a. "EMS AKS", "Operator", "Oblivion") met Neil Hill (a.k.a. "Ne/H/il"). Revell was working as a nurse on a psychiatric ward at Callan Park Hospital where Hill was also working. Hill and Revell shared a house and an interest in the manifesto of the German radical Marxist group known as the Sozialistisches Patientenkollektiv (SPK). The duo were influenced by Kraftwerk, Can, Neu!, Faust, and John Cage – they started playing their own variety of industrial music as SPK. The band recruited two teenagers, Danny Rumour (later of The Cruel Sea) on lead guitar and David Virgin on bass guitar (both ex-Ugly Mirrors, and went on to form Sekret Sekret), on early recordings by SPK in 1979. In that year they independently released three 7" singles; "No More" in April, "Factory" in August, and "Mekano" in November. The B-side of the "Factory" single, "Slogun", featured lyrics inspired by the Marxist manifesto: "Kill, Kill, Kill for inner peace / Bomb, Bomb, Bomb for mental health / Therapy through violence!"

Dominik Guerin (a.k.a. "Tone Generator") joined on synthesizers in 1980, and later concentrated on the band's visual content. In May they issued an EP, Meat Processing Section, as Surgical Penis Klinik. Without Hill, SPK relocated to London where Guerin and Revell recorded their debut album, Information Overload Unit, in a Vauxhall squat with the help of Revell's brother Ashley Revell (a.k.a. "Mr. Clean") and Mike Wilkins (guitar, bass guitar, backing vocals). The album deals with psychotic states and intellectual disability. The original 1981 release on Side Effects has a black cover with a small picture of head being operated on, the 1985 version on Normal is blue and pictures a man in a wheelchair and the 1992 CD reissue has System Planning Korporation with the initials SPK highlighted in red. McFarlane suggested "the album's harsh, thumping sound appealed to fans of Throbbing Gristle and early Cabaret Voltaire".

In June 1980 they issued the single, Meat Processing Section (featuring "Slogun" and "Mekano", from their 1979 singles), on Throbbing Gristle's Industrial Records label. Other musicians working with SPK included James Pinker (drums, percussion) and Karel van Bergan (violin, vocals), who toured with them to the United States.

In July 1981 in Australia, the M Squared label released another single, "See Saw". The cover depicts SoliPsiK with members given as Kitka (a.k.a. Kit Katalog), Sushi (a.k.a. Margaret Hill), Charlyiev (a.k.a. Paul Charlier) and Skorne (Neil Hill). Both tracks are co-written by Charlier and Hill.

In 1982, Guerin and Revell were joined by Brian Williams (a.k.a. Lustmord), John Murphy (a.k.a. "Kraang", later of Foresta Di Ferro and Death In June) and Derek Thompson (who later had a brief stint in The Cure and went on to record as Hoodlum Priest). SPK's second album, Leichenschrei (English: The Scream of the Corpse) (1982), shows Sozialistisches Patienten Kollektiv (English: Socialist Patients' Collective). After its recording they were joined by Sinan Leong on vocals, who had initially auditioned for a planned SPK side-project, Dance Macabre. Leong and Revell later married.

In 1983 Thompson left SPK because Revell "wanted to make a very commercial sounding album which I did not". McFarlane found that "SPK had softened the approach somewhat with discernible synth melodies and dance beats coming to the fore amongst the noise". In August 1983, the group issued a compilation album, Auto Da Fé, showing SepPuKu written with SPK in red capital letters. It included three studio tracks recorded in 1981. Bush suggested the album was the "beginning of a more organized approach for SPK material, Auto Da-Fé presents an intriguing industrial-disco fusion, reminiscent of prime contemporary material by Cabaret Voltaire and DAF ... Although fans probably thought of [it] as an unconscionable crossover attempt, it's still quite experimental in retrospect". The three-track EP, Dekompositiones (also by SepPuKu) followed soon after. Its tracks were added to a later version of Auto Da Fé.

In early February 1984, just before his 28th birthday, Neil Hill committed suicide. Two days later, his wife Margaret Hill (née Nikitenko) died as a result of complications from anorexia. In March SPK issued another single, "Metal Dance", which was co-written by Revell, Leong and Thompson. SPK returned to Australia for a tour and recorded their third album, Machine Age Voodoo, in Sydney which was issued in 1984 on WEA Records. For the album, SPK's Revell and Leong were joined by Jeff Bartolomei on keyboards, Mary Bradfield-Taylor on vocals, Graham Jesse on saxophone, James Kelly on guitar, Sam McNally on keyboards and Phil Scorgie on bass guitar. McFarlane saw the album as "mixed mainstream disco-pop and sweet vocals with electronic experimentation (sort of like Blondie meets Kraftwerk)". While Bush felt it was "another leap towards dance-rock and away from the group's industrial past". The album spawned a single, "Junk Funk" in 1985.

Leong and Revell returned to Australia and added Karina Hayes as vocalist. They issued Zamia Lehmanni: Songs of Byzantine Flowers in 1986 which provided a single, "In Flagrante Delicto". It was followed by Digitalis Ambigua: Gold & Poison in 1987. Allmusic's Sean Carruthers observed that Revell "was in a period of transition... [s]omewhere between the industrial noise of the early years and his later soundtrack work". In 1988, the band issued a live album, Oceania... In Performance 1987 but disbanded during the year. In 1989, Revell moved into work on scores and soundtracks. SPK's track "In Flagrante Delicto" was used by Revell for his work on the soundtrack for the 1989 film, Dead Calm. By 1991 Leong and Revell had moved to Los Angeles.

On July 12 2025, Graeme Revell and his son Robert appeared at ExConventoLive in Pordenone, Italy, billed as "SchizoPhreniK / << SPK >>" , performing early SPK tracks and new material. The show was promoted as SPK's first live appearance in almost forty years. This performance was followed by an appearance by the Revells at VOD-Festival in Germany on July 19, billed as "Graeme Revell (SPK)". These two performances precede the debut of a "new entity" featuring Graeme and Robert Revell, named SPKtR, which is expected to begin touring in the fall of 2026.

== Initialism ==
The meaning of SPK is deliberately unclear; and some of the album covers suggest several different variations. The most well known is Sozialistisches Patienten Kollektiv, but there are also others, such as Surgical Penis Klinik, System Planning Korporation, SepPuKu, Selective Pornography Kontrol, Special Programming Korps, Sushi Patata Kalabacita and SoliPsiK.

== Works ==
The most notable recordings of SPK are early: Information Overload Unit, Leichenschrei and Auto-da-fé. SPK's music is best described as disturbing and psychologically disorienting, in line with their nihilistic, subversive philosophy. Live performances included video backing (some of which was issued in two Twin Vison videos, Despair and Two Autopsy Films), transgressive performances with animal carcasses and other attempts to make the audience uncomfortable. The group issued manifestos, such as DoKuments 1 and 2, "The Post-Industrial Strategy", which appeared in RE/Search's Industrial Culture Handbook. There is a clear dichotomy between early industrial SPK (1978–83) and the more commercial music later favoured by Revell. Later releases, such as Machine Age Voodoo (1984), were more synthpop-oriented than industrial. Still later, the group moved into electronic orchestral work, with the release of Zamia Lehmanni: Songs of Byzantine Flowers (1986).

== Discography ==
=== Albums ===
- Information Overload Unit – LP/CD – 1981
- At the Crypt – Cassette – Sterile Records – 1981
- Leichenschrei – LP/CD – 1982 (No. 14 UK Indie)
- Last Attempt at Paradise – Cassette – 1982
- From Science to Ritual – Cassette – 1983, released in conjunction with the N°10 Primavera 1983 issue of Italian magazine 'VIVA', titled "Viva Noir"
- Machine Age Voodoo – LP – 1984
- Zamia Lehmanni: Songs of Byzantine Flowers – LP/CD – 1986
- Digitalis Ambigua: Gold & Poison – LP/CD – 1987
- Oceania Live – LP/CD – 1988

=== Compilations ===
- Auto-Da-Fé – LP/CD – 1983 (No. 11 UK Indie No. 62 US CMJ)
- Box 1 – 3CD – 1992
- S.P.K. Dokument (Recordings 1979–1983) – 7LP/7CD – 2016

=== Singles, EPs ===
- "No More/Kontakt/Germanik" – Single – 1979
- "Factory"/"Retard"/"Slogun" – Single – 1979
- "Mekano/Kontakt/Slogun" – Single – 1979
- "Meat Processing Section" EP (Slogun/Mekano) – Single – 1980 (No. 42 UK Indie)
- "See Saw/Chambermusik" (as SoliPsiK) – Single – 1981
- "Dekompositiones" – 12" EP – 1983
- "Metal Dance" – Single – 1983 (No. 91 UK) (No. 5 UK Indie)
- "Junk Funk" – Single – 1984 (No. 94 UK)
- "Flesh & Steel" – Single – 1985
- "In Flagrante Delicto" – Single – 1986
- "Off the Deep End" – Single – 1987
- "Breathless" – Single – 1987

=== Videos and films ===
- "Despair" – SPK Video by Twin Vision – 1982
- "Two Autopsy Films" – SPK Video by Twin Vision – 1983
- "Despair" – Digitally extracted DVD by Twin Vision – 2007
