= USS Silversides (SS-236) =

US Navy Gato-class submarine

- USS Silversides (SS-236) returning to the Muskegon Channel after undergoing repairs in Wisconsin

History

United States
- Name: Silversides
- Namesake: silversides
- Builder: Mare Island Naval Shipyard
- Laid down: 4 November 1940
- Launched: 26 August 1941
- Sponsored by: Elizabeth H. Hogan
- Commissioned: 15 December 1941
- Decommissioned: 17 April 1946
- Stricken: 30 June 1969
- Status: Museum ship at Muskegon, Michigan

General characteristics
- Class & type: Gato-class diesel-electric submarine
- Displacement: 1,525 long tons (1,549 t) surfaced; 2,424 long tons (2,463 t) submerged
- Length: 311 ft 9 in (95.02 m)
- Beam: 27 ft 3 in (8.31 m)
- Draft: 17 ft (5.2 m) maximum
- Propulsion: 4 × Fairbanks-Morse Model 38D8-1/8 9-cylinder opposed-piston diesel engines driving electrical generators; 2 × 126-cell Sargo batteries; 4 × high-speed Elliott electric motors with reduction gears; 2 × propellers; 5,400 shp (4.0 MW) surfaced; 2,740 shp (2.04 MW) submerged
- Speed: 21 knots (39 km/h; 24 mph) surfaced; 9 knots (17 km/h; 10 mph) submerged
- Range: 11,000 nmi (20,000 km; 13,000 mi) surfaced at 10 knots (19 km/h; 12 mph)
- Endurance: 48 hours at 2 knots (4 km/h; 2 mph) submerged; 75 days on patrol
- Test depth: 300 ft (90 m)
- Complement: 6 officers, 54 enlisted
- Armament: 10 × 21-inch (533 mm) torpedo tubes; 6 forward, 4 aft; 24 torpedoes; 1 × 4-inch (102 mm) / 50 caliber deck gun; Bofors 40 mm and Oerlikon 20 mm cannon
- USS Silversides
- U.S. National Register of Historic Places
- U.S. National Historic Landmark
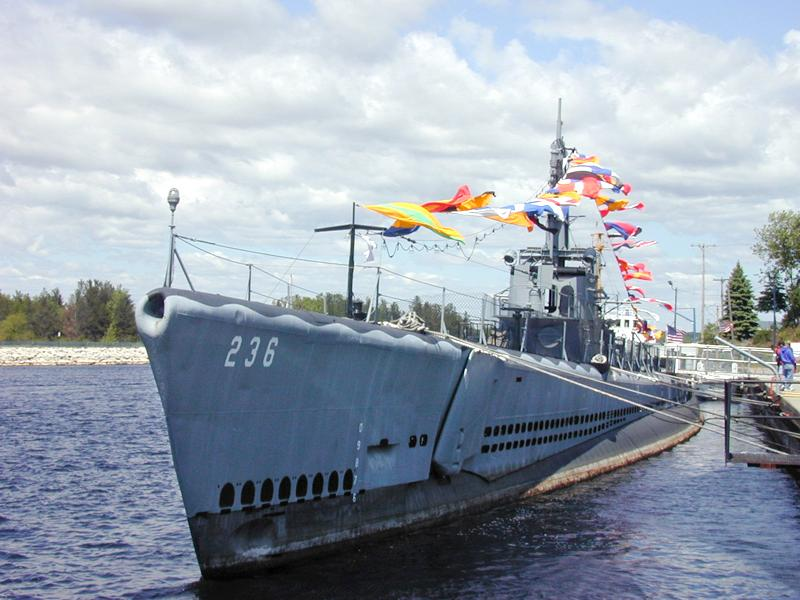
- Silversides, a national landmark and a museum, at "full dress ship" in Muskegon for the U.S. Navy's Submarine Centennial, 3 June 2000

- Location within Michigan
- Location: Muskegon, Michigan
- Coordinates: 43°13′48″N 86°19′58″W
- Built: 1941
- NRHP reference No.: 72000453

Significant dates
- Added to NRHP: 18 October 1972
- Designated NHL: 14 January 1986

USS Silversides (SS/AGSS-236) is a Gato-class submarine, the first ship of the United States Navy to be named for the silversides.

Silversides was one of the most successful submarines in the Pacific Theater of World War II, with 23 confirmed sinkings, totalling more than 90,000 long tons (91,444 t) of shipping. She received a Presidential Unit Citation for cumulative action over four patrols, and 12 battle stars. She presently serves as a museum ship in Muskegon, Michigan, and is a National Historic Landmark.

== Construction ==
Her keel was laid down on 4 November 1940, by the Mare Island Navy Yard in Vallejo, California. She was launched on 26 August 1941, sponsored by Mrs. Elizabeth H. Hogan, and commissioned on 15 December 1941, with Lieutenant Commander Creed C. Burlingame in command.

== Service in World War II ==
=== First patrol: April–June 1942 ===
After shakedown off the California coast, Silversides set course for Hawaii, arriving at Pearl Harbor on 4 April 1942. Departing Pearl Harbor on 30 April, Silversides headed for the Japanese home islands, in the area of Kii Suido, for the first of her many successful war patrols. On 10 May, just after 08:00 local time, the submarine used her 3-inch (76 mm) gun to heavily damage the Japanese guard boat Ebisu Maru No.5. During this 75-minute action, an enemy machine-gun bullet killed one of her deck gunners, Torpedoman's Mate Third Class Mike Harbin of Oklahoma, the only man lost in action aboard Silversides during World War II. Harbin was buried at sea later that evening. On 13 May, Silversides fired torpedoes at an enemy submarine; although explosions were heard, a definite sinking could not be confirmed.

On 17 May, while maneuvering through an enemy fishing fleet and approaching her targets, Silversides's periscope became entangled in a fishnet marked by Japanese flags held aloft on bamboo poles. The sub continued her approach, fishnet and all, and fired three torpedoes at the first ship, a 4,000-ton cargo ship. Two hits tore the victim's stern open. While that ship was sinking, the second cargo ship was also hit, but her fate could not be determined. Patrol boats were closing in as the submarine, probably the only American submarine to make an attack while flying the Japanese flag, quickly left the vicinity. After damaging a freighter and tanker in the same area, Silversides terminated her first war patrol at Pearl Harbor on 21 June.

=== Second and third patrols: July–November 1942 ===
Silversides's second war patrol was also conducted in the area of Kii Suido, from 15 July to 8 September. On 28 July, she sank a 4,000-ton transport, followed by the sinking of the passenger/cargo ship Nikkei Maru on 8 August. She scored damaging hits on a large tanker on the night of 14 August, and on 31 August, sank two enemy trawlers before returning to Pearl Harbor.

Her third war patrol, conducted in the Caroline Islands, did not result in any sinkings, although severe damage was done to a large cargo ship and two torpedo hits on a Japanese destroyer or light minelayer were observed, which did an undetermined level of damage. She terminated her third patrol at Brisbane, Australia, on 25 November.

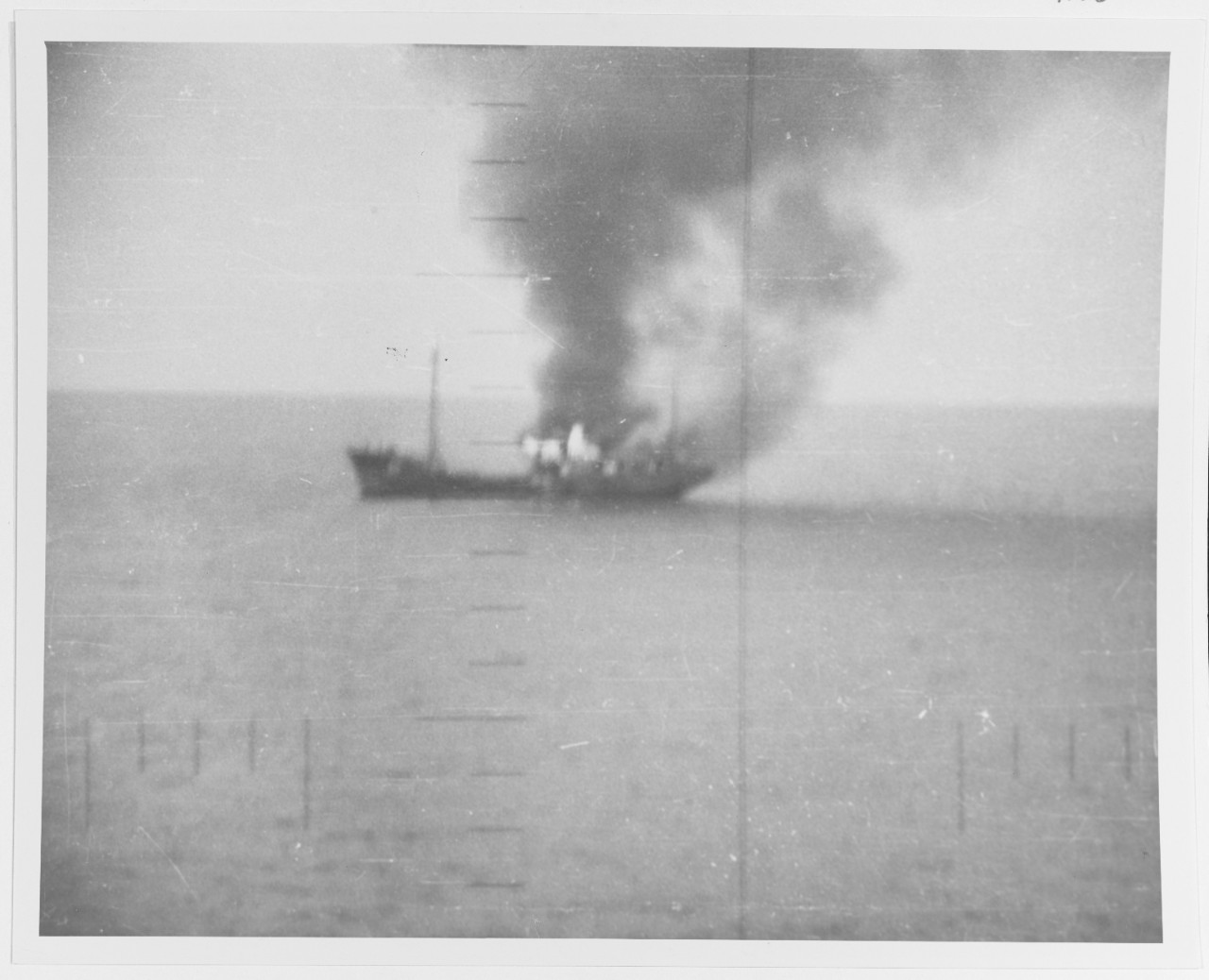
Photo of Japanese ship attacked and damaged by USS Silversides on 14 October 1942

=== Fourth patrol: December 1942 – January 1943 ===
Silversides departed Brisbane on 17 December 1942 and set course for New Ireland for her fourth war patrol. While far out at sea on the night of 22 December, the submarine's medical orderly, Pharmacist’s Mate First Class Thomas Moore, performed a successful emergency appendectomy on Fireman Second Class George Platter, using ether as anesthesia and rudimentary tools primarily fashioned from kitchen utensils. With the operation over at 03:00 on 23 December, the submarine surfaced, only to be immediately forced down by a Japanese destroyer and compelled to endure a severe depth charge attack. Thinking herself safe, Silversides surfaced, only to find the destroyer still there. Additionally, a Japanese airplane had arrived on the scene and proceeded to drop three bombs on the submarine, severely damaging her bow planes and causing them to lock on full dive. Silversides managed to level off just short of crush depth and eventually evaded the enemy ship before surfacing to recharge her batteries and effect emergency repairs.

While off Truk on 18 January 1943, Silversides torpedoed and sank her largest target of the war, the 10,022-ton oil tanker Toei Maru. Two days later, the submarine had one of her most productive days of the war. After paralleling a convoy throughout the daylight hours, she moved on ahead at sundown and lay in wait (an "end around" tactic). As the targets moved into range, Silversides fired torpedoes at overlapping targets and sank three enemy ships—the cargo ships Surabaya Maru, Somedono Maru, and Meiu Maru. The attack had scarcely abated when an armed torpedo was found to be stuck in a forward torpedo tube. Since disarming the torpedo was impossible, the commanding officer decided to attempt to refire it, an extremely dangerous maneuver. The submarine moved in reverse at top speed and fired. The torpedo shot safely from the tube, disappearing as it moved toward the horizon.

When a serious oil leak was discovered later that night, the submarine left the patrol area two days ahead of schedule and returned to Pearl Harbor on 31 January for a major overhaul.

=== Fifth and sixth patrols: May–September 1943 ===
Silversides's fifth war patrol commenced on 17 May and was conducted in the Solomon Islands area. Enroute the patrol area on 28 May, one of the more unusual moments of the war occurred, as stated in the fifth war patrol report:

Proceeded on surface toward assigned position. On the 28th a frigatebird made a high-level bombing attack, scoring a direct hit on the bare head and beard of the OOD, Lt. Bienia. No indication by radar prior to attack.

Continuing on, the submarine's primary mission for this patrol was to lay a minefield in Steffan Strait, between New Hanover and New Ireland, but she did not neglect enemy shipping. On the night of 10–11 June, she sank the 5,256-ton cargo ship Hide Maru; for her efforts, Silversides was forced to endure a severe depth charging. She returned to Brisbane for refit on 16 July.

For her sixth war patrol, under newly assigned Lt. Commander John S. "Jack" Coye, Jr., from 21 July to 4 September, Silversides patrolled between the Solomons and the Carolines. Since she was plagued with malfunctioning torpedoes and a scarcity of targets, she returned to Brisbane empty handed.

=== Seventh and eighth patrols: October 1943 – January 1944 ===
Silversides set sail on 5 October for her seventh war patrol, in which she sank four enemy ships in waters ranging from the Solomon Islands to the coast of New Guinea. On 18 October, she torpedoed and sank the cargo ship Tairin Maru, and, on 24 October, made a series of daring attacks to send the cargo ships Tennan Maru and Kazan Maru and the passenger/cargo ship Johore Maru to the bottom. She returned to Pearl Harbor for refit on 8 November.

Silversides patrolled off the Palau Islands for her eighth war patrol, where on 29 December 1943, she brought havoc to an enemy convoy of cargo ships, sinking Tenposan Maru, Shichisei Maru, and Ryuto Maru. She terminated her eighth patrol at Pearl Harbor on 15 January 1944.

=== Ninth and 10th patrols: February–June 1944 ===
For her ninth war patrol, Silversides departed Pearl Harbor on 15 February and set course for waters west of the Marianas Islands. On 16 March, she sank the cargo ship Kofuku Maru. The remainder of the patrol was devoid of worthwhile targets, so the submarine sailed to Fremantle on 8 April. While on her 10th war patrol, again off the Marianas Islands, Silversides destroyed six enemy vessels for a total of over 14,000 tons. On 10 May, she torpedoed and sank the cargo ship Okinawa Maru, followed up with the passenger/cargo ship Mikage Maru, and then sent the converted gunboat Choan Maru No. 2 beneath the waves. Ten days later, she added to her score when she sank another converted gunboat, the 998-ton Shosei Maru. On 29 May, the submarine torpedoed and sank the cargo ships Shoken Maru and Horaizan Maru, and then headed for Pearl Harbor, arriving on 11 June. Two days later, she got underway for Mare Island Navy Yard for overhaul, returning to Pearl Harbor on 12 September.

=== Eleventh and 12th patrols: September 1944–February 1945 ===
Silversides cleared Pearl Harbor on 24 September for her 11th war patrol, conducted off Kyūshū, Japan. Although this patrol was unproductive, she aided in the rescue of a stricken sister submarine. Salmon (SS-182) had been badly damaged in a severe depth charging and was forced to surface and try to escape while fighting enemy escorts in a gun battle, a task for which a submarine is badly outmatched. The gunfire flashes brought Silversides to the scene. She deliberately drew the attention of some of the escorts, then quickly dove to escape the gunfire. Soon, submarines Trigger (SS-237) and Sterlet (SS-392) joined in helping Silversides to guard Salmon and escorting the stricken submarine back to Saipan, arriving on 3 November. Silversides terminated her 11th patrol at Midway Island on 23 November.

Silversides's 12th war patrol commenced on 22 December 1944 and was spent in the East China Sea. Despite aggressive searching, she found few worthwhile targets. However, when an opportunity did come her way, Silversides took full advantage. On 25 January 1945, she torpedoed the 4,556-ton cargo ship Malay Maru. She returned to Midway Island on 12 February.

=== Thirteenth and 14th patrols: March–July 1945 ===
During her 13th war patrol, Silversides was a member of a coordinated attack group with submarines Hackleback (SS-295) and Threadfin (SS-410), patrolling off Kyūshū. Although she again found few worthwhile targets, the submarine did manage to damage a large freighter and to sink a trawler before returning to Pearl Harbor on 29 April.

Silversides's 14th and final war patrol began with a departure from Pearl Harbor on 30 May. This patrol was spent on lifeguard station in support of airstrikes on Honshu, Japan. On 22 July, she rescued a downed fighter pilot from the light aircraft carrier Independence (CVL-22), and two days later, she recovered a downed United States Army Air Forces airman. She ended this patrol at Apra Harbor, Guam, on 30 July. The submarine was undergoing refit there when the hostilities with Japan ended on 15 August.

== Postwar service: 1945–1969 ==
Silversides transited the Panama Canal on 15 September 1945, arriving at New York City on 21 September. After shifting to New London, Connecticut, she was decommissioned on 17 April 1946 and placed in reserve until 15 October 1947, when she was placed in service as a training ship for naval reservists at Chicago, Illinois. After a 1949 overhaul, she remained at Chicago in support of Naval Reserve training as a stationary training vessel for the rest of her service.

Silversides was last dry-docked in 1949, when she entered the reserve fleet and her solid-brass propellers were removed.

On 6 November 1962, Silversides was reclassified as an auxiliary submarine with hull classification symbol AGSS-236, and on 30 June 1969, her name was struck from the Naval Vessel Register. The South Chicago Chamber of Commerce promptly applied to the United States Department of the Navy for custody of Silversides to preserve her as a memorial.

== 1973–present ==
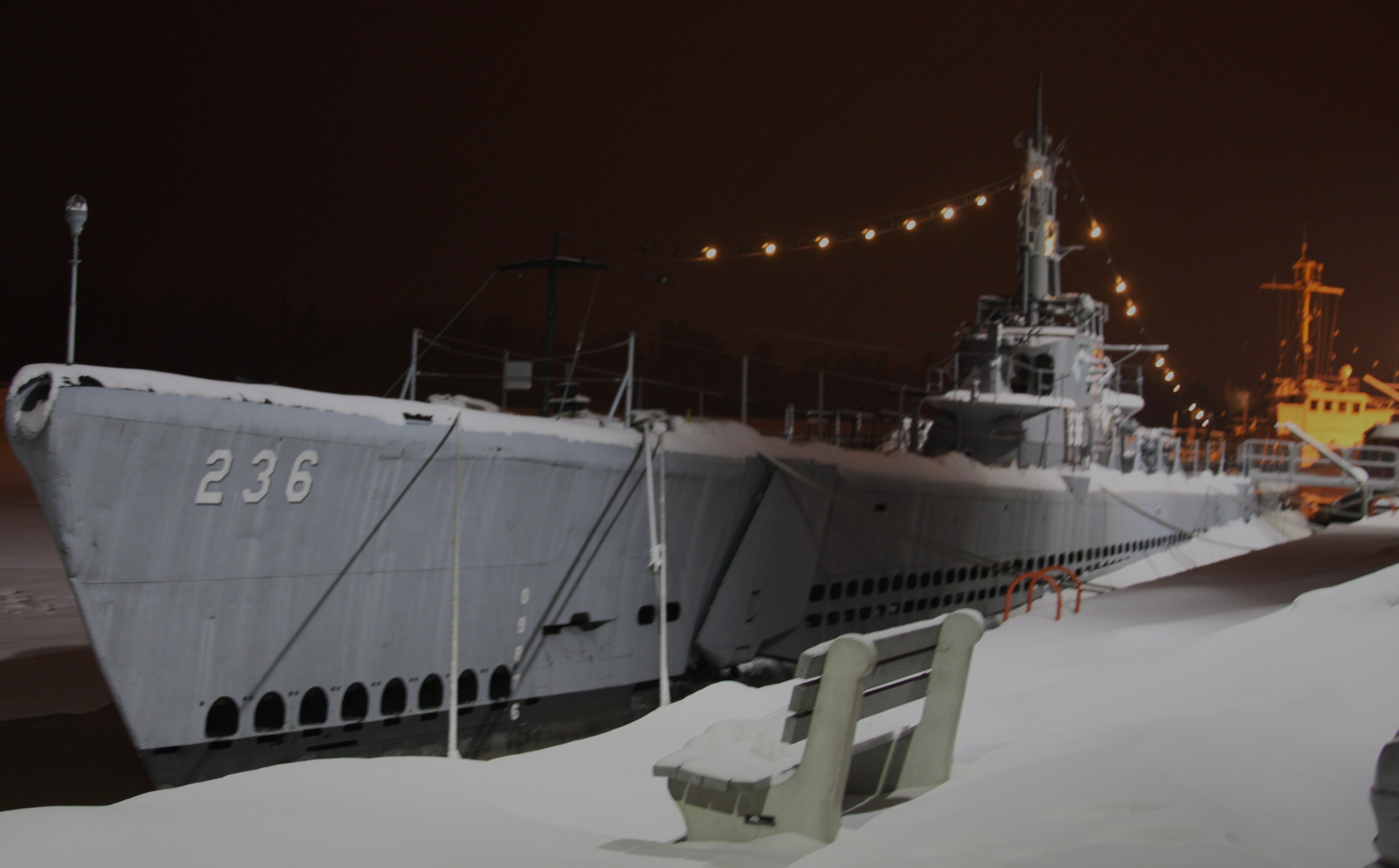
Silversides as seen in a Michigan winter in Muskegon, 26 January 2008

Silversides was transferred to the Combined Great Lakes Navy Association, later Great Lakes Naval and Maritime Museum, on 24 May 1973. She was berthed behind Chicago's Naval Armory until 1979 then moved to Navy Pier. A small crew of volunteers spent tens of thousands of man-hours to repair damage from vandals, age, and general neglect, restoring and maintaining her at their own expense and eventually serving as docents and chaperones. Volunteers initially found a musty, mildewed boat filled with junk and peeling paint, with evidence of water damage in the forward compartments, though the aft end was in reasonably good condition.

Volunteers quickly took steps to stop the decay. Rotted lines were replaced and the boat was resecured to the pier, the bilges were pumped dry, electric power and heat were brought on board, and a leak in the No. 3 torpedo tube was sealed off. The first major renovation completed was stripping, undercoating, and repainting the hull to the waterline. The job took several months, with a break over the winter, but once completed, Silversides looked nearly new. Below decks, the boat was cleaned and general restoration got underway. Considerable rewiring was done to bring light to all areas of the boat, the plumbing underwent investigation for leaks sprung in once-frozen pipes, and a crew set about surveying the Fairbanks Morse 38D8 1/8 nine-cylinder, 1,535 hp (1,145 kW), opposed-piston engines. The seven-cylinder auxiliary engine was brought back to life in 1975.

She was moved to Navy Pier in 1979. That July, the first main engine, No. 3, was brought back to life for the first time since 1946. The No. 4 engine was restored in time for the 1984 US Submarine Veterans of World War II convention. In 1987, the submarine was moved to Muskegon, Michigan, to serve as the centerpiece of the new Great Lakes Naval Memorial and Museum.

Normally, United States Navy submarines are dry-docked every five years while on active duty. If permanently moored in fresh water, the maintenance interval can be extended to 25 years. In 2004, 55 years after Silversides's last dry-docking, the museum and two submarine veterans organizations formed a "Save the Silversides" fund and began soliciting tax-deductible donations through veterans groups and military publications. They based their plans on the dry-dock overhaul of USS Cobia (SS-245), a memorial in Manitowoc, Wisconsin, which cost US$500,000 in 1996.

The Silversides finally left Muskegon under tow on 13 July 2026 for her dry-dock hull restoration. She was towed 120 miles (190 km) across Lake Michigan in 16 hours to Sturgeon Bay, Wisconsin. The $3.5-million overhaul at Fincantieri Bay Shipbuilding was funded by a $750,000 grant from the National Park Service's Save America's Treasures program, as well as by multiple donors and sponsors.

== Gallery ==
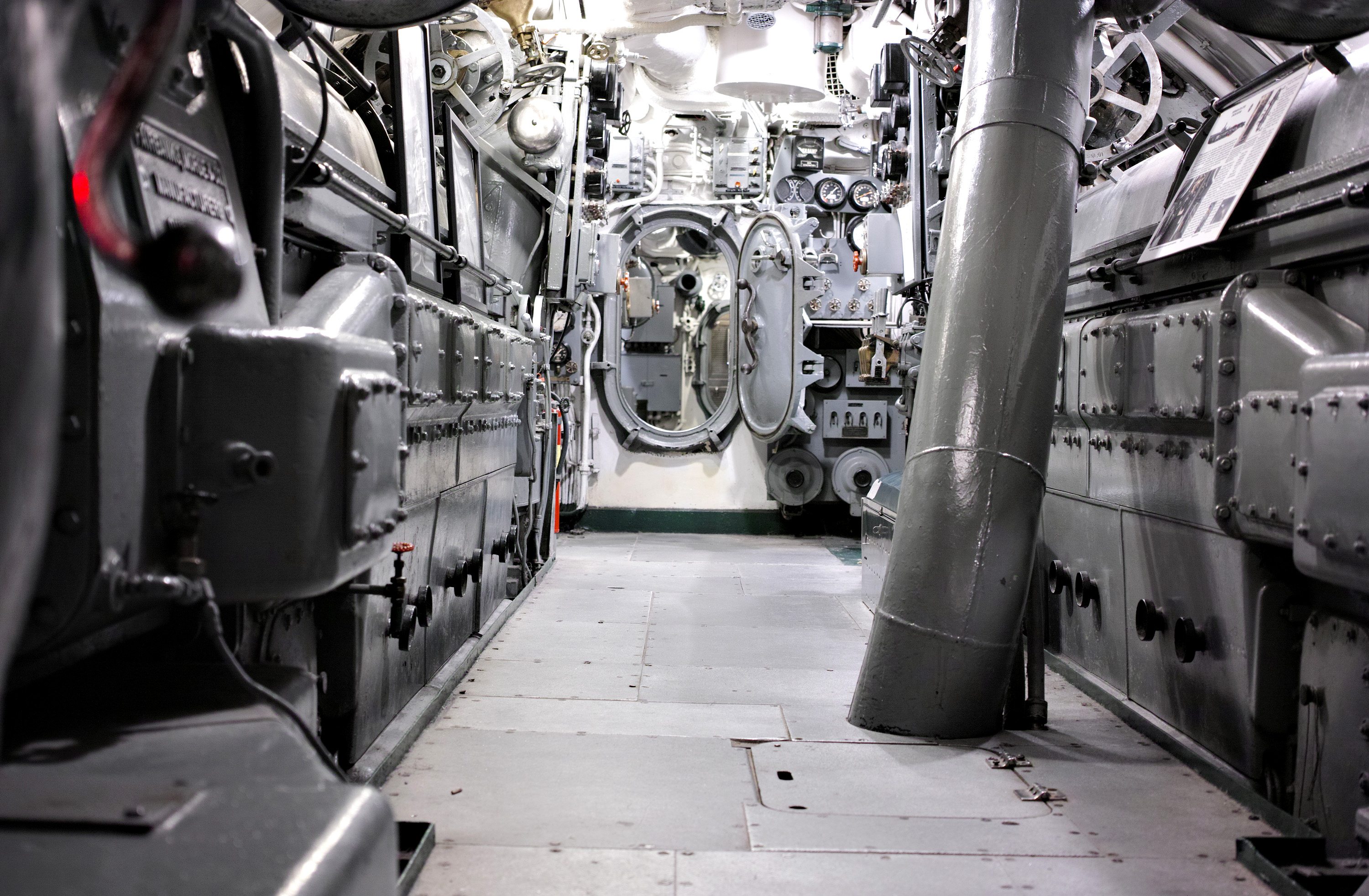

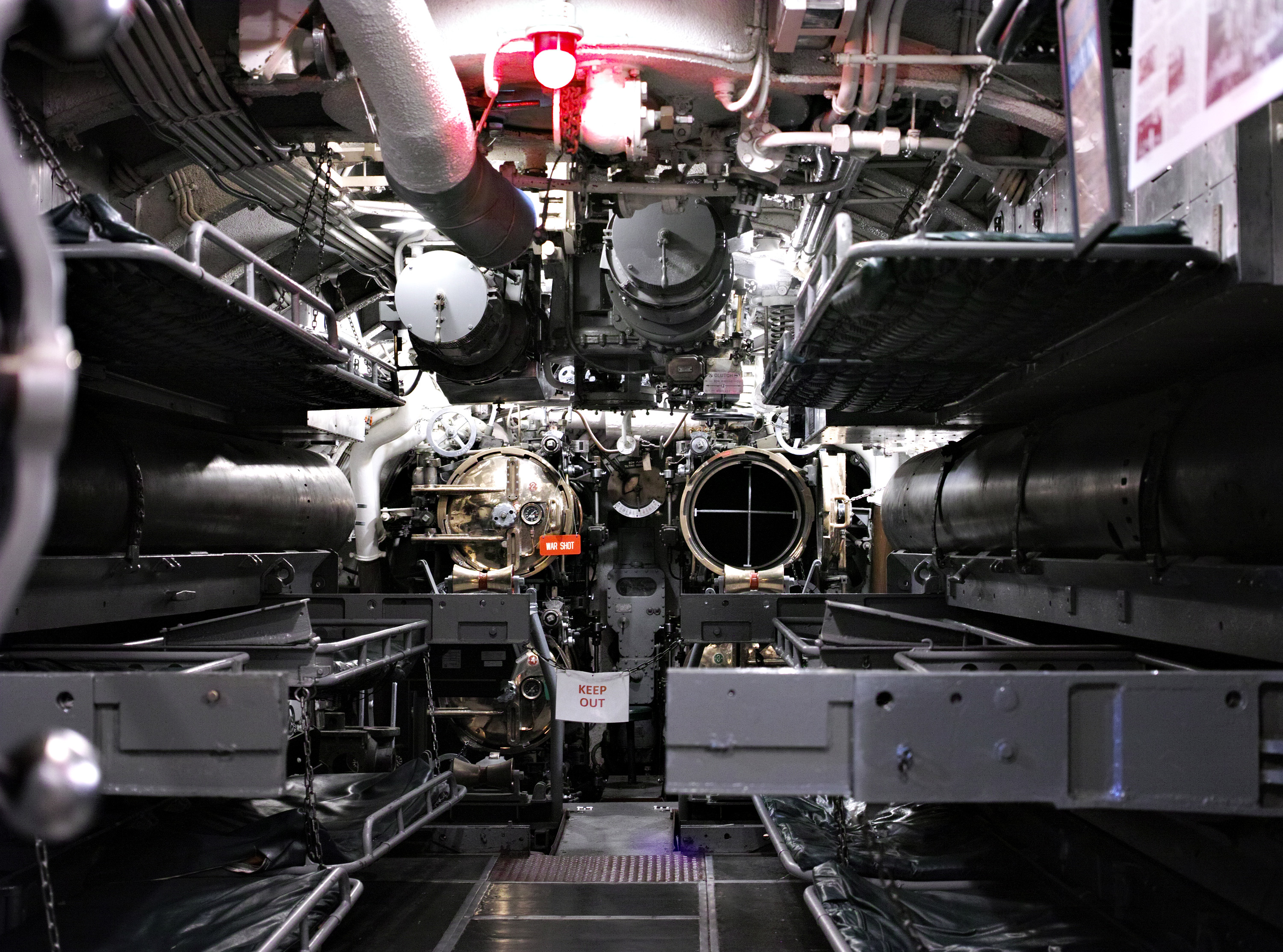

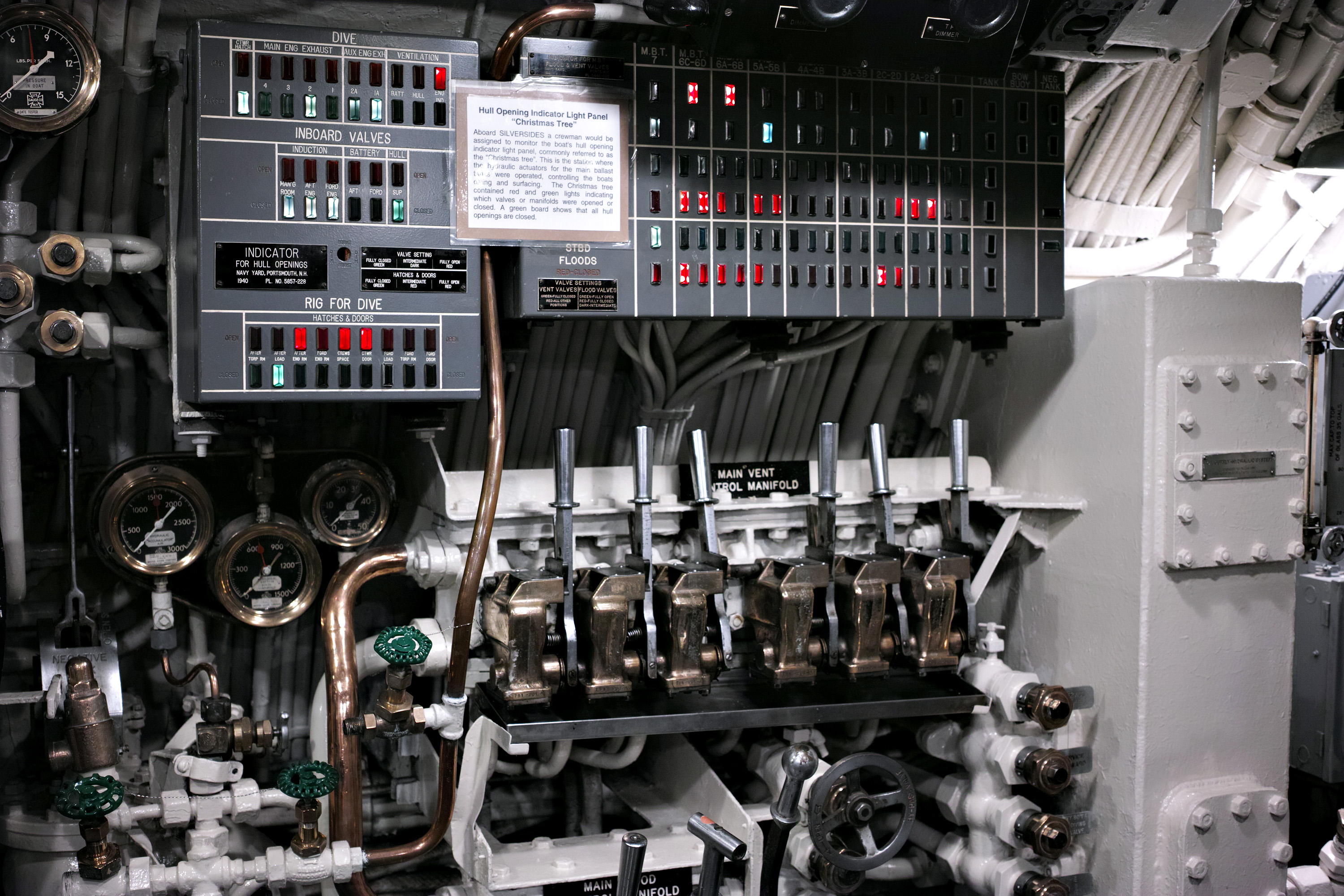

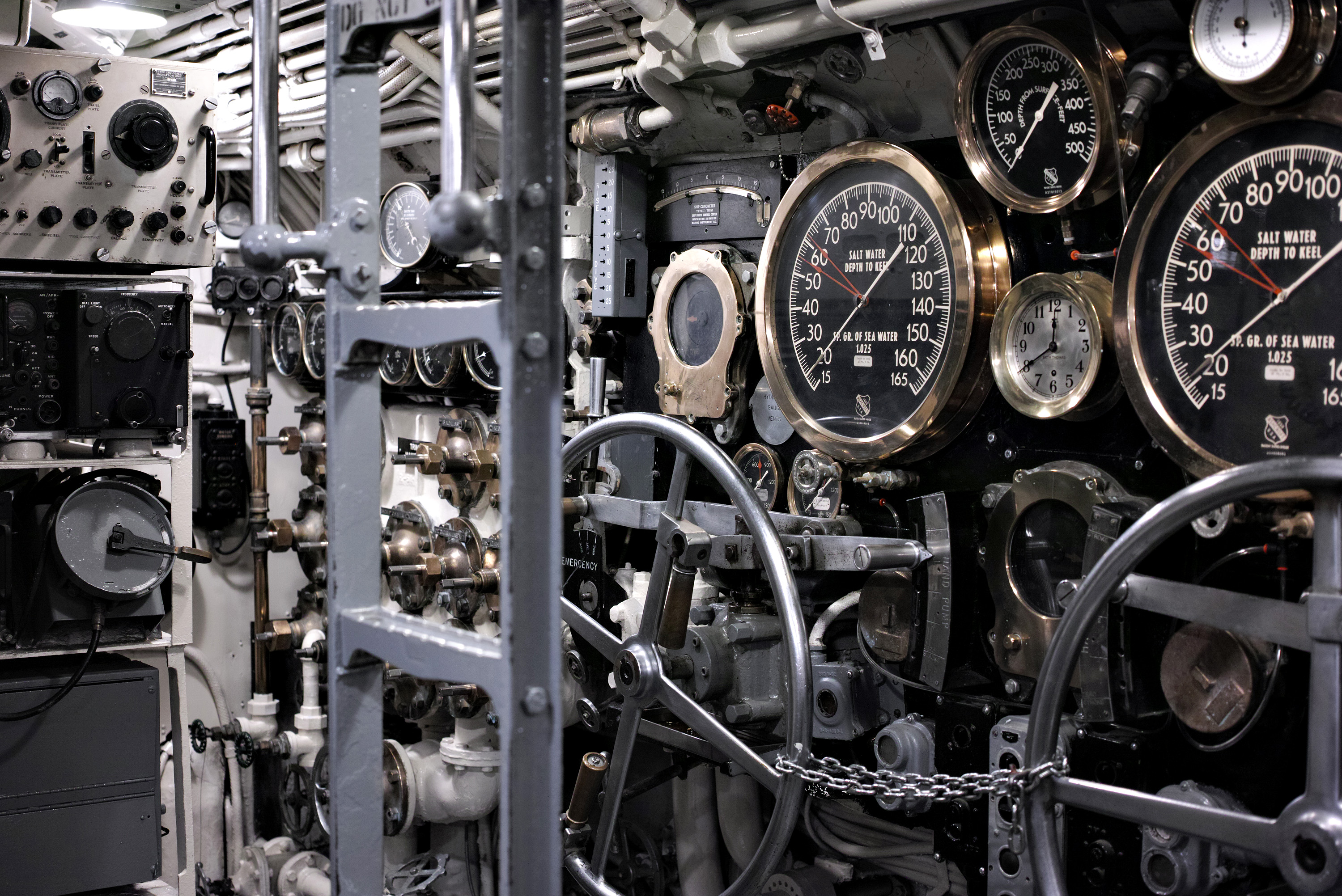

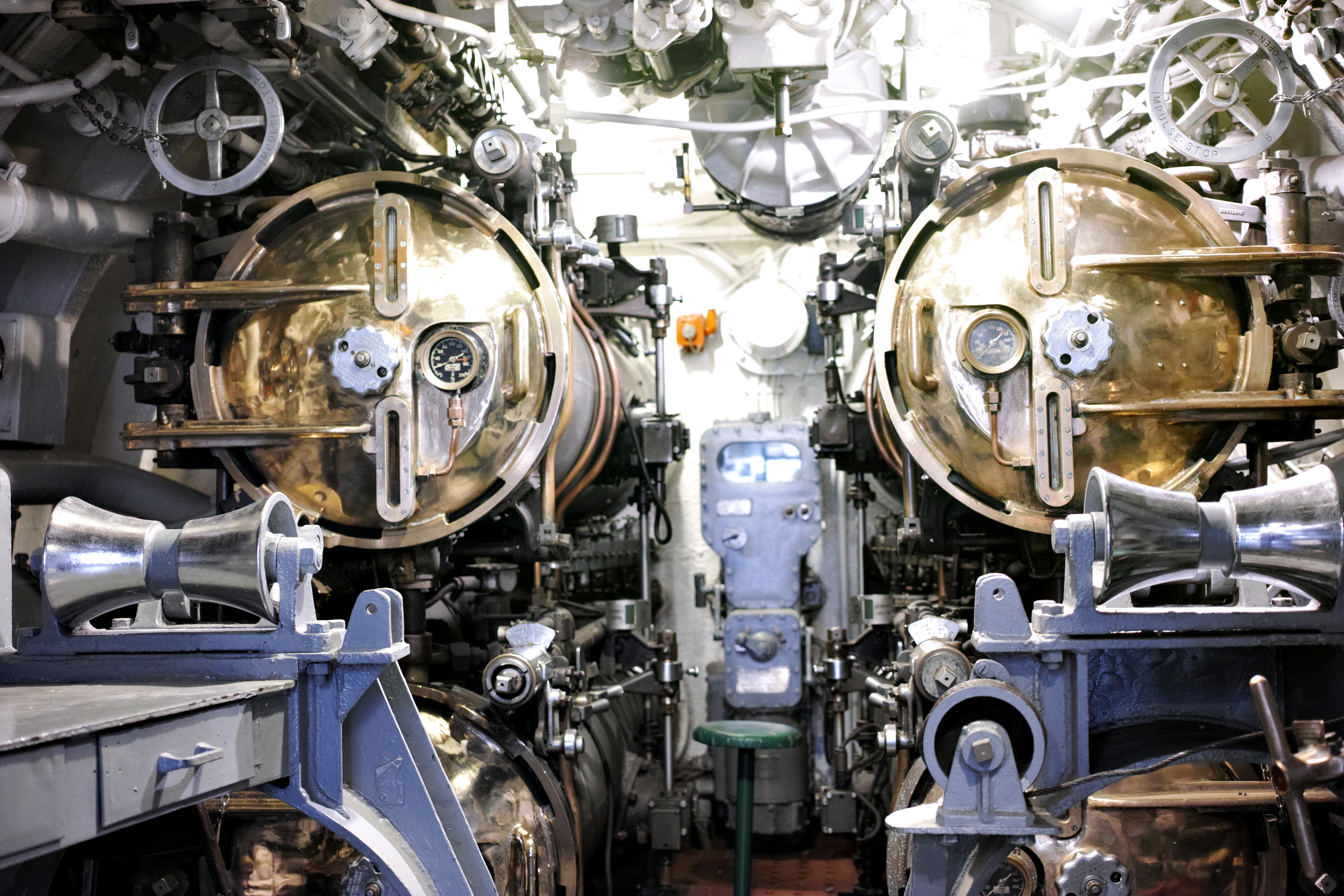

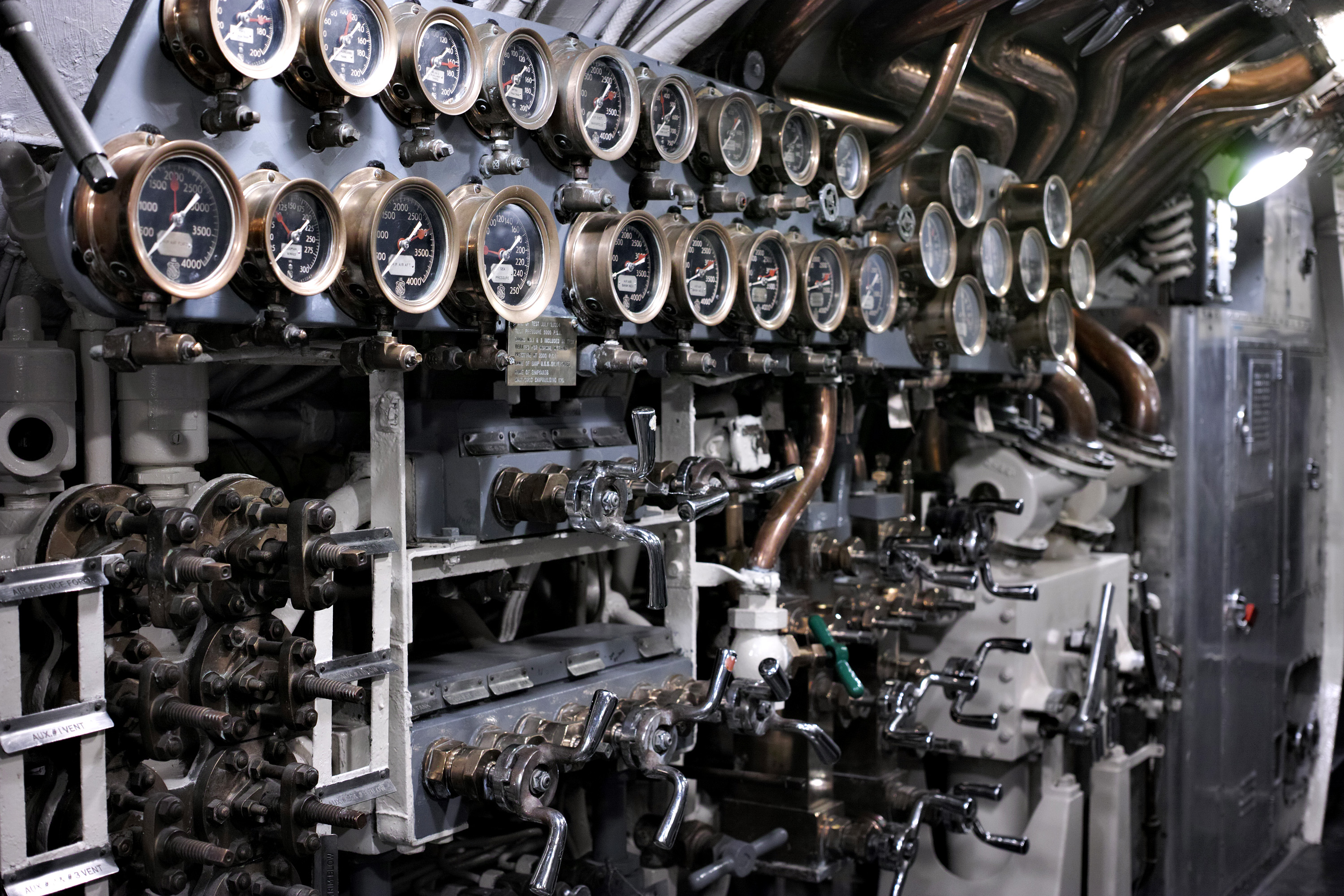

== Film production ==
Silversides was used for exterior scenes in the 2002 film Below to depict the fictional USS Tiger Shark. She was towed in Lake Michigan for filming.

== Awards ==
Silversides received 12 battle stars for World War II service and was awarded one Presidential Unit Citation for cumulative action over four patrols. She is officially credited with sinking 23 ships, the third-most of any Allied World War II submarine, behind only the USS Tang and USS Tautog, according to JANAC figures. The ships sunk by Silversides amounted to 90,080 tons, ranking among the top five for tonnage sunk by an American submarine during the war. Judged by the Joint Army-Navy Assessment Committee (JANAC), Silversides has the most prolific combat record of any still-extant American submarine.

Other sources state that Silversides sank 31 ships totaling 100,685 tons during World War II.

== Museum ship ==
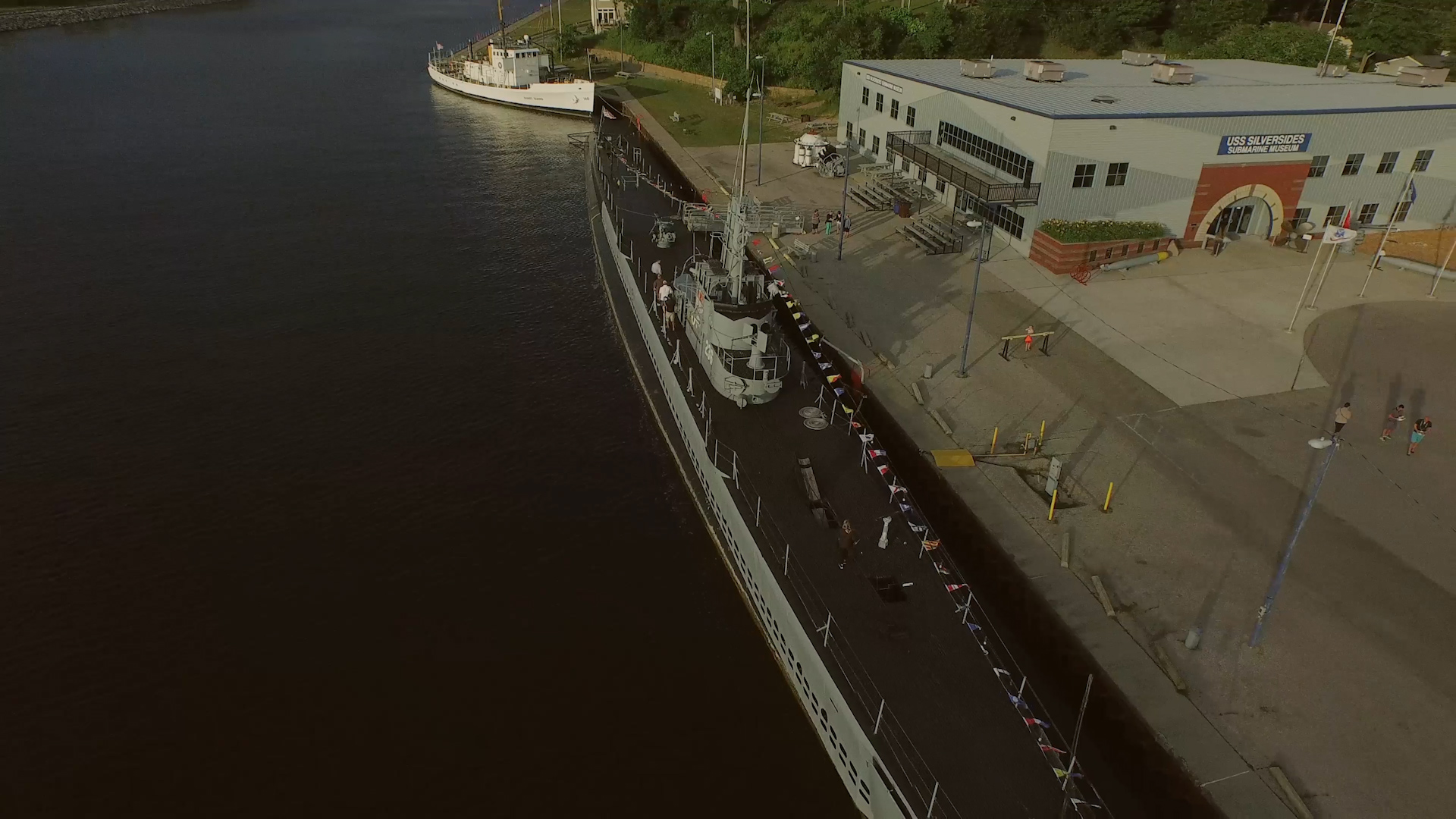
USS Silversides (SS-236) docked in Muskegon Lake Channel at the USS Silversides Submarine Museum

Originally opened as the Great Lakes Naval Memorial and Museum, it is now known as the USS Silversides Submarine Museum, which also includes a museum building.

The museum staff starts the USS Silversides' Fairbanks Morse engines up to six times per year to keep the engines healthy.

== See also ==
- List of maritime museums in the United States
