= Hoodlum Priest (album) =

Studio album by Hoodlum Priest
- Released: 1998
- Genres: Industrial, techno
- Label: Iris Light Records
- Producer: Derek Thompson

Hoodlum Priest chronology
Beneath the Pavement... (1990)	Hoodlum Priest (1998)

Hoodlum Priest is the third and final album from UK industrial and trip hop band Hoodlum Priest. This album features an Egyptian theme sampling various bits of Egyptian mythology and experiments with elements of drum and bass and Indian- and African-influenced music. This album also features vocals from former Gaye Bykers on Acid frontman Ian Hoxley (on this album called "Mary Magdelyte").

The song "Gas" was recorded with longtime collaborator Cliff Hewitt, and was recorded in Helsinki as part of the Ambient City project.

== Track listing ==
1. "Can You Feel This"
2. "Naked Time"
3. "You Know Who I Am"
4. "No Fear"
5. "Slow and Low"
6. "Gas"
7. "Addicts"
8. "We Walk the Earth"

== Samples used ==
- "Addicts" samples the film Naked Lunch
- "Naked time" samples the film Twins of Evil
