= USS Hackleback =

Submarine of the United States

Coordinates: 32°38′N 132°22′E

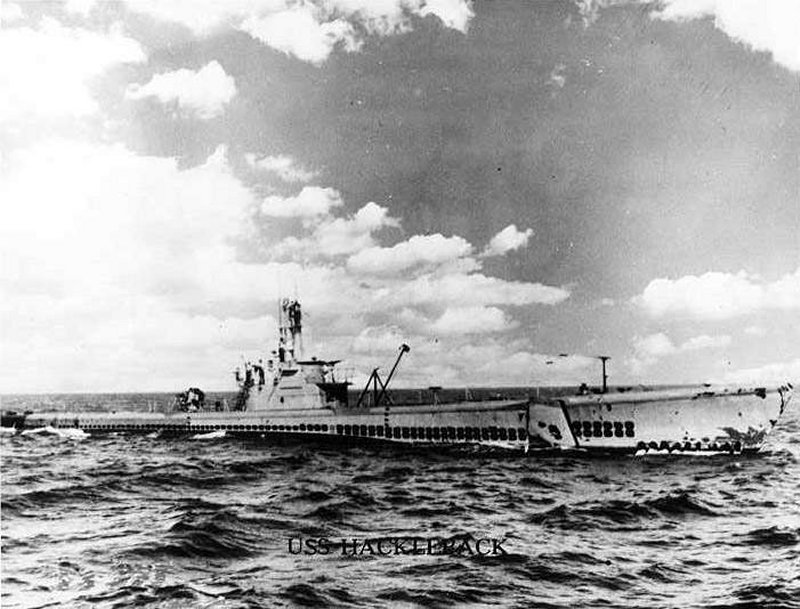
- USS Hackleback (SS-295)

History

United States
- Name: Hackleback
- Builder: Cramp Shipbuilding Co., Philadelphia
- Yard number: 550
- Laid down: 15 August 1942
- Launched: 30 May 1943
- Commissioned: 7 November 1944
- Decommissioned: 20 March 1946
- Stricken: 1 March 1967
- Fate: Sold for scrap, 4 December 1968

General characteristics
- Class & type: Balao class diesel-electric submarine
- Displacement: 1,526 tons (1,550 t) surfaced; 2,424 tons (2,463 t) submerged
- Length: 311 ft 8 in (95.00 m)
- Beam: 27 ft 3 in (8.31 m)
- Draft: 16 ft 10 in (5.13 m) maximum
- Propulsion: 4 × Fairbanks-Morse Model 38D8-1/8 9-cylinder opposed-piston diesel engines driving electrical generators; 2 × 126-cell Sargo batteries; 4 × high-speed Elliott electric motors with reduction gears; 2 × propellers; 5,400 shp (4.0 MW) surfaced; 2,740 shp (2.04 MW) submerged
- Speed: 20.25 knots (38 km/h) surfaced; 8.75 knots (16 km/h) submerged
- Range: 11,000 nautical miles (20,000 km) surfaced at 10 knots (19 km/h)
- Endurance: 48 hours at 2 knots (3.7 km/h) submerged; 75 days on patrol
- Test depth: 400 ft (120 m)
- Complement: 10 officers, 70–71 enlisted
- Armament: 10 × 21-inch (533 mm) torpedo tubes; 6 forward, 4 aft; 24 torpedoes; 1 × 5-inch (127 mm) / 25 caliber deck gun; Bofors 40 mm and Oerlikon 20 mm cannon

USS Hackleback (SS-295), a Balao-class submarine, was a ship of the United States Navy named after the hackleback, a freshwater fish of the sturgeon family.

Hackleback was launched 30 May 1943 by the Cramp Shipbuilding Co., Philadelphia; sponsored by Mrs. W. L. Wright; and commissioned 7 November 1944.

After training out of New London, Hackleback reported to the Fleet Sonar School at Key West 24 December. Two weeks training there were followed by further training at Balboa, Canal Zone, and Hackleback sailed for Pearl Harbor 25 January 1945. The new submarine participated in still more training exercises at Pearl Harbor before departing for her first war patrol 6 March.

Japanese merchant shipping had been decimated by the Pacific submarine fleet, and Hackleback was to encounter no suitable targets in any of her patrols. But on this first patrol, she played a key role in the sinking of the last of Japan's super-battleships, the Yamato.

Patrolling the Bungo Suido area late in the night of 6 April, Hackleback made radar contact on a fast group of ships at about 25,000 yards (23,000 m). She sent a steady stream of location reports back to Pearl Harbor, at the same time attempting to close with the task group. Hackleback three times came to within 13,000 yards (12,000 m) of the Yamato force, but destroyers forced her out of range before she could get in position to fire torpedoes.

Yamato was not to escape, however. The following morning, 7 April, planes from Admiral Mitscher's famous TF 58, guided by Hackleback's contact location reports, struck the Yamato group. In four successive waves, the carrier planes accounted for the destruction of Yamato, the light cruiser Yahagi, and two destroyers, leaving only six destroyers of the Japanese task force to escape.

During the rest of her first patrol, Hackleback made two gun attacks on small ships, but discontinued the engagements when it appeared they were trying to lure her in close to shore. Returning to Midway 26 April, she prepared for a second patrol and on 21 May sailed.

This time Hackleback's primary mission was lifeguard duty off Sakishima Gunto as the carriers pounded the Japanese home islands. On 22 June she picked up a downed carrier pilot, Lt. Comdr. C. P. Smith. Hackleback also engaged in some shore bombardment. After an air strike on Shokoto Sho 7 July, the submarine closed the island and fired 73 rounds of 5-inch (130 mm) shells. No surface contacts were made on this patrol. Hackleback returned to Guam 12 July.

Sailing for her third war patrol 14 August, the submarine received an unofficial flash "Tokyo accepts" that same day, and on 16 August headed for Midway. The long Pacific war had ended. Hackleback spent 2 weeks at Midway and then sailed for home, reaching San Francisco 11 September.

Hackleback decommissioned there 20 March 1946 and was placed in reserve at Mare Island. Hackleback's classification was changed to AGSS-295 on 6 November 1962. Her name was struck from the Navy List 1 March 1967 and was sold for scrapping, 4 December 1968 to Zidell Explorations, Portland, Ore.
