= Abbott and Holder =

Art gallery and dealership in London, England

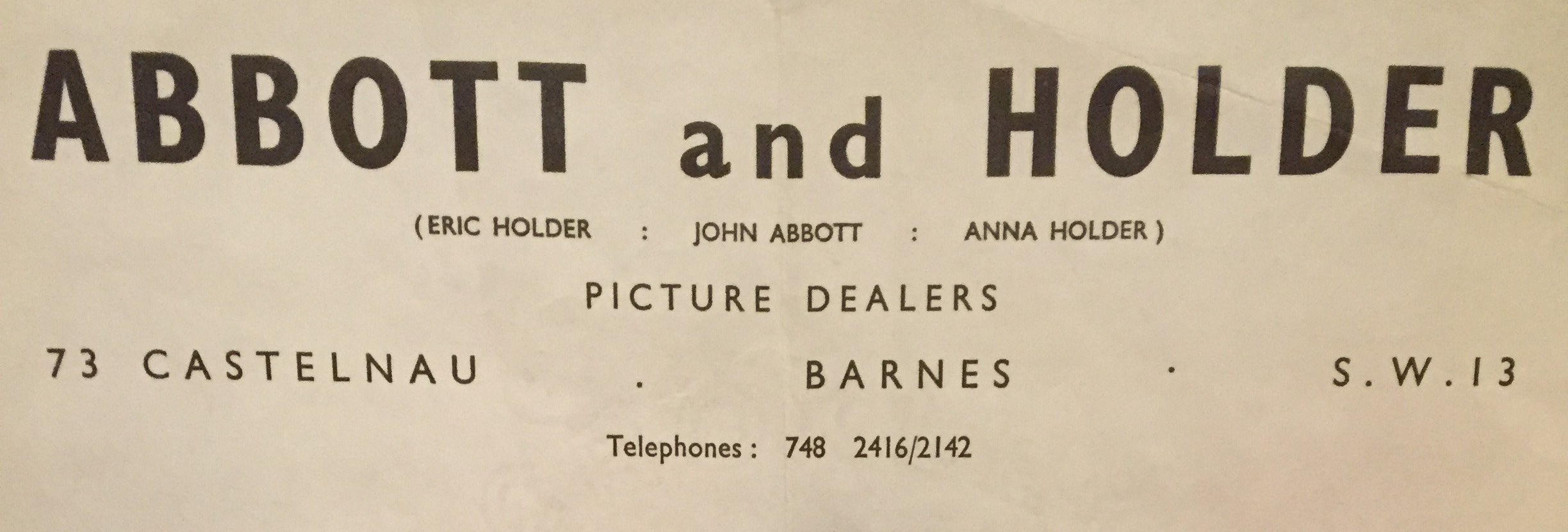
- Letterhead, as used in 1969, listing Eric Holder, John Abbott and Anna Holder
- Type: Art dealers
- Founded: 1936
- Founders: Robert Abbott; Eric Holder
- Headquarters: 30 Museum Street, Camden, London, England; 51.5178712°N 0.1259238°W
- Website: www.abbottandholder-thelist.co.uk

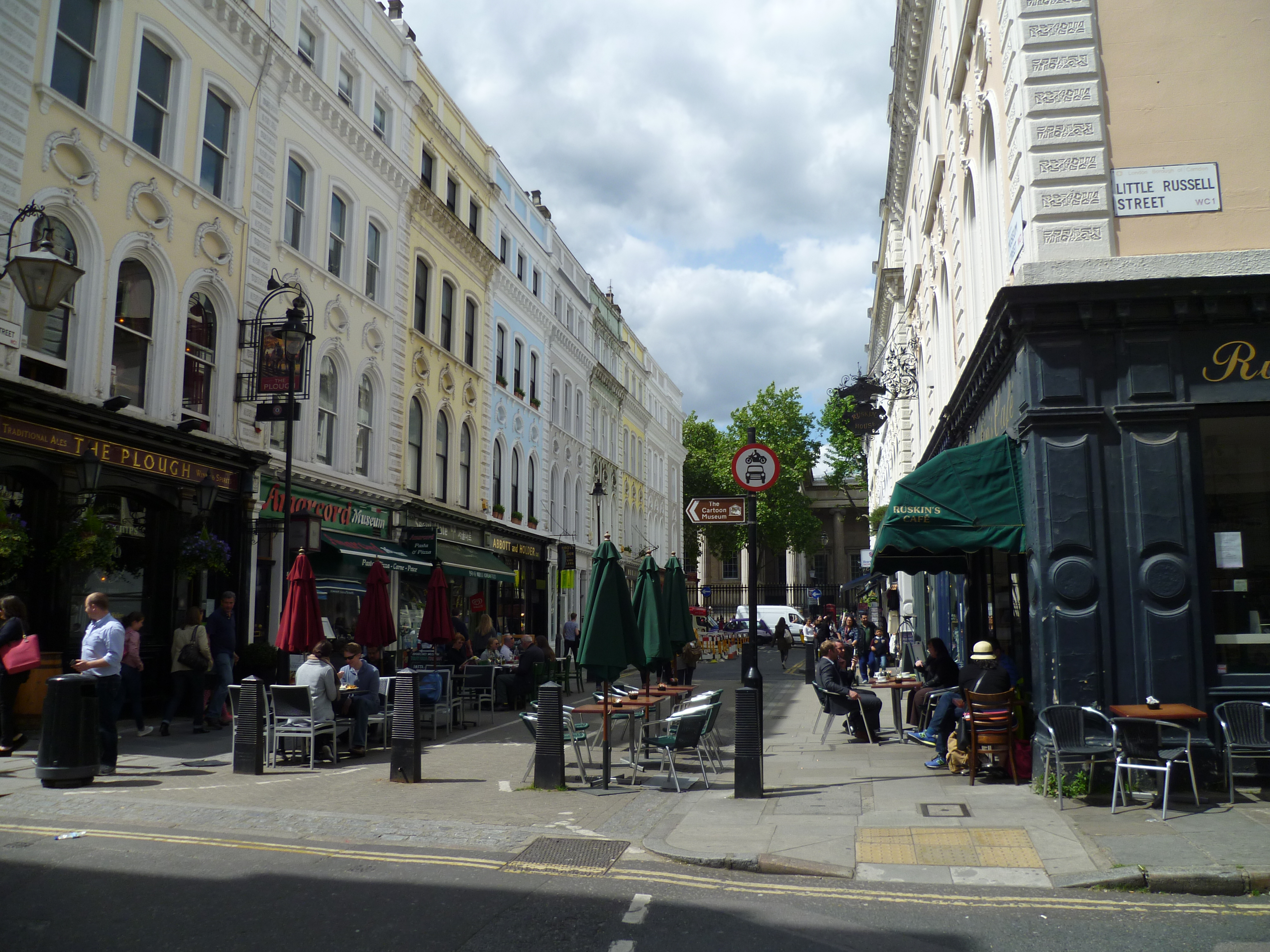
Museum Street: Abbott and Holder is the fourth building in on the left with the pale blue frontage

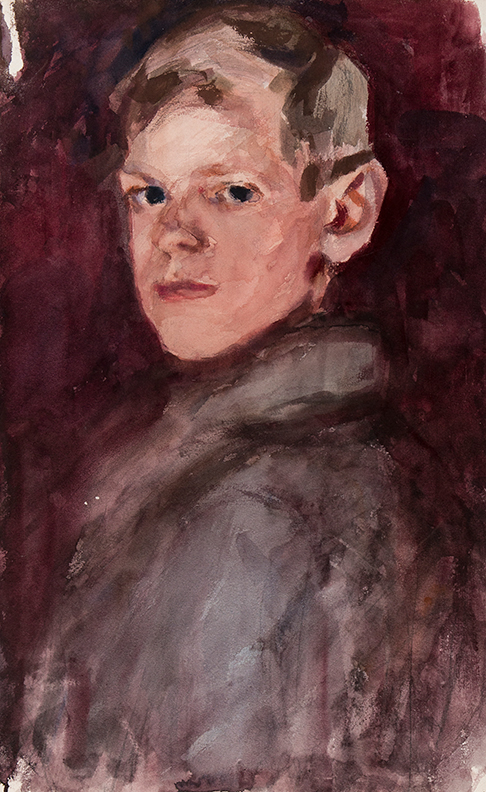
Portrait of a boy by Harry Becker, offered for sale by Abbott and Holder in 2017.

Abbott and Holder is an art gallery and dealership in London, England, that specialises in low-price, 19th- and 20th-century English paintings, watercolours, drawings and prints. The gallery has been located at 30 Museum Street, London WC1, since 1987.

The company was founded by and named after Robert Abbott, a former headmaster and a Quaker minister, and non-theist Quaker Eric Holder, an accountant and lifelong conscientious objector who joined the FAU during the Second World War. The pair first dealt art jointly in 1936 after meeting at the Friends' Meeting House, Tottenham, where Robert Abbott lived in a flat attached to the House (the original Tottenham FMH was demolished in 1961), with the first "List" published in 1942. In 1947, Robert Abbott and Eric Holder bought 73 Castelnau, SW13, from Frederick Tisdall on a seventeen-year lease. In 1957, the year before Eric Holder's youngest daughter Sally was born, the freehold of 73 was acquired. Robert retired on health grounds in 1959 and Eric bought Robert's share of business and Castelnau. In 1969, Anna Holder was listed on the company's letterhead and the family helped in running the business. Robert's nephew John Abbott (1937–2011), who had worked for the firm in the 1960s, became a partner in 1971. Eric Holder retired in 1981 and Philip Athill, an art history graduate and assistant at the gallery from 1979, eventually the company's Managing Director, became a partner in 1984. John Abbott retired in 2001. On 31 March 2021, Athill announced on the gallery's website that he had on his retirement passed the business to junior director Tom Edwards, thereby maintaining an unbroken line of successful partnership since 1936.

Before moving to Museum Street, the gallery occupied part of a house at 73 Castelnau, Barnes, which had been Robert Abbott's home. The large Victorian property belonged to the Eric Holder family from 1959 to 1981, with "the business" occupying the basement and ground floor.

As well as general sales, promoted with a monthly-updated "list", the gallery holds topical and artist-specific exhibitions, occasionally including living artists. In 1960, Eric Holder invited Reginald Gray to hold his first London solo exhibition at the gallery. In 1961, Gray painted Holder's portrait.

The gallery's clients have included the UK Government Art Collection and Abbott and Holder's near neighbour, the British Museum. More than four hundred and fifty works on paper at the British Museum have come from them. Many other prominent institutions from around the world also have work that passed their hands, including the National Gallery of Canada in Ottawa, Art Gallery of New South Wales in Sydney, and the Metropolitan Museum of Art in New York.

Abbott and Holder are members of the British Antique Dealers' Association.
