= Graeme Revell =

New Zealand musician, composer

- Born: Auckland, New Zealand
- Education: Auckland Grammar School; University of Auckland
- Occupations: Musician; composer
- Years active: 1989–present
- Awards: AACTA Award for Best Original Music Score; BMI Film Music Awards; * The Crow; * The Saint; * Lara Croft: Tomb Raider; * Daredevil; * Freddy vs. Jason; * Sin City; * Pineapple Express; BMI TV Music Awards; * CSI: Miami; * Eleventh Hour; Venice Film Festival Award for Best Score

Graeme Revell is a New Zealand musician and composer. He came to prominence in the 1980s as the leader of the industrial rock/electronic rock group SPK. Since the 1990s he has worked primarily as a film score composer.

Some of Revell's best known film scores include Dead Calm (1989), The Crow (1994), Street Fighter (1994), Mighty Morphin Power Rangers: The Movie (1995), From Dusk till Dawn (1996), The Craft (1996), The Saint (1997), The Negotiator (1998), Bride of Chucky (1998), Titan A.E. (2000), Lara Croft: Tomb Raider (2001), Daredevil (2003), Freddy vs. Jason (2003), and Sin City (2005). He is also known for his frequent collaborations with director David Twohy, having scored Below (2002) and the Riddick franchise. He is an eight-time recipient of the BMI Film Music Award, including the Richard Kirk Career Achievement Award, and an AACTA Award winner.

== Biography ==
=== Early life ===
Revell attended Auckland Grammar School, where he finished his final year in 7A. As an orderly in a psychiatric hospital in Australia in the late 70's, he and another psychiatric nurse, Brett Guerin, formed one of industrial music's first bands, SPK, as an outgrowth of interest in music therapy. He spent the next decade making music that ranged from extreme to beautiful to academic and earning a reputation for wild stage stunts that included accidentally setting an audience member on fire with a flamethrower. Revell's break came in 1989, when he scored the Australian film Dead Calm. A Hollywood agent, Richard Kraft, heard it and tracked him down. Since then, he moved to Hollywood, working with everything from 85-piece orchestras for Mighty Morphin Power Rangers, to Tuvan singers and Armenian stringed instruments for The Crow, to brassy jazz and hip-hop rhythm loops for Fled, with Laurence Fishburne and Stephen Baldwin.

=== Education and training ===
Revell is a classically trained pianist and French horn player, but also graduated from the University of Auckland with degrees in economics and political science.

=== Vocational pursuits ===
He worked as a regional planner in both Australia and Indonesia, and was also an orderly in an Australian psychiatric hospital.

=== Musical career ===
Revell was a founding member of the industrial music band SPK, playing keyboards and percussion. The SPK single, "In Flagrante Delicto", was the basis for the Dead Calm film score (his first) that won him an Australian Film Industry award in 1989.

Most of Revell's subsequent projects were film scores. But in 1997, he teamed up with Roger Mason to create a non-film music album Vision II – Spirit of Rumi, released through New York based Angel Records. The two coproduced, supplied some of the instrumental accompaniment, and set to music 11 poems by renowned 13th century Persian poet Jalāl ad-Dīn Muhammad Rūmī. Vocals were provided by Noa, Lori Garson, Esther Dobong'Na Essiene a.k.a. Estha Divine, and the late Nusrat Fateh Ali Khan.

In 2002–03, he assisted the rock band Evanescence on their debut album, Fallen, in which he is credited for doing most of the string arrangements. He has also done string arrangements for Ludus, Stefy, Biffy Clyro and The Wombats.

== Style ==
Revell's musical style is predominantly electronic and computer-based, yet often utilises classical instruments or entire arrangements for certain pieces (similar to his contemporary counterparts, Hans Zimmer and Mark Isham). The orchestral scores that Revell has composed have changed throughout his career—from Bernard Herrmann-like pieces to Ennio Morricone-influenced works. "Whenever I write songs, I always have visual images in mind, and I have always changed styles dramatically. That's not good for a long-term rock career, but it's good if you want to score films." "I'm trying to bring a dose of class to Hollywood," he said. "I want my music to be the real thing instead of some terrible synthesized thing thrown together in a week. I don't want to sound just like everybody else."

Revell's music is often re-used from movie to movie and in more recent times he has collaborated with other artists on their albums. After the success of his soundtrack on Red Planet where he used the voice of French singer Emma Shapplin to back up and often lead his score, he collaborated with her on her own album Etterna, producing all of her songs. He has been interviewed for the independent documentary Finding Kraftland.

== Collaborators ==
Revell has been assisted in sound design by Brian Williams, who creates dark ambient music under the stage name Lustmord.

== Awards and nominations ==
On 18 May 2005, Revell was honored at the annual BMI Film & TV Awards with the Richard Kirk Award for Outstanding Career Achievement.

=== Academy of Science Fiction, Fantasy & Horror Films, USA ===
1994	Nominee Saturn Award	Best Music Hard Target (1993)

=== ASCAP Film and Television Music Awards ===
1993	Winner ASCAP Award	Top Box Office Films The Hand That Rocks the Cradle (1992)

=== International Film Music Critics Award (IFMCA) ===
2008	Nominee IFMCA Award	Best Original Score for a Documentary Film Darfur Now (2007)

=== World Soundtrack Awards ===
2001	Nominee World Soundtrack Award	Best Original Score of the Year Not Released on an Album Blow (2001)

=== Venice Film Festival ===
1997	Winner Golden Osella	Best Score Chinese Box (1997)

=== Online Film & Television Association ===
2001	Winner OFTA Television Award	Best Music in a Motion Picture or Miniseries Anne Frank: The Whole Story (2001)
2001	Winner OFTA Television Award	Best New Theme Song in a Motion Picture or Miniseries Dune (2000)
2001	Nominee OFTA Television Award	Best Music in a Motion Picture or Miniseries Dune (2000)
2001	Nominee OFTA Television Award	Best New Theme Song in a Motion Picture or Miniseries Anne Frank: The Whole Story (2001)

=== Fangoria Chainsaw Awards ===
2003	Nominee Chainsaw Award	Best Score Below (2002)
1997	Nominee Chainsaw Award	Best Score From Dusk Till Dawn (1996)
1994	Winner Chainsaw Award	Best Soundtrack The Crow (1994)

=== BMI Film & TV Awards ===
2009	Winner BMI Film Music Award	Pineapple Express (2008)

== Works ==
=== Theatrical film ===
==== 1980s ====
Year	Title	Director
1989	Dead Calm	Phillip Noyce

==== 1990s ====
Year	Title	Director	Notes
1990	Spontaneous Combustion	Tobe Hooper	
1990	Child's Play 2	John Lafia	
1990	Till There Was You	John Seale	
1991	Deadly	Esben Storm	
1991	The People Under the Stairs	Wes Craven	"Additional Orchestral Music" credit
1991	Until the End of the World	Wim Wenders	
1992	The Hand That Rocks the Cradle	Curtis Hanson	
1992	Love Crimes	Lizzie Borden	
1992	Traces of Red	Andy Wolk	
1992	Body of Evidence	Uli Edel	
1993	Boxing Helena	Jennifer Lynch	
1993	Hear No Evil	Robert Greenwald	
1993	The Crush	Alan Shapiro	
1993	Faraway, So Close!	Wim Wenders	
1993	Hard Target	John Woo	Composed with Tim Simonec
1993	Ghost in the Machine	Rachel Talalay	
1994	No Escape	Martin Campbell	Composed with Tim Simonec
1994	The Crow	Alex Proyas	Also conductor.
1994	S.F.W.	Jefery Levy	
1994	Street Fighter	Steven E. de Souza	
1995	Tank Girl	Rachel Talalay	
1995	The Basketball Diaries	Scott Kalvert	
1995	Mighty Morphin Power Rangers: The Movie	Bryan Spicer	
1995	Killer: A Journal of Murder	Tim Metcalfe	
1995	The Tie That Binds	Wesley Strick	
1995	Strange Days	Kathryn Bigelow	
1996	From Dusk till Dawn	Robert Rodriguez	
1996	Race the Sun	Charles T. Kanganis	
1996	The Craft	Andrew Fleming	
1996	Fled	Kevin Hooks	
1996	The Crow: City of Angels	Tim Pope	
1997	The Saint	Phillip Noyce	
1997	Spawn	Mark A.Z. Dippé	
1997	Chinese Box	Wayne Wang	
1997	Suicide Kings	Peter O'Fallon	
1998	The Big Hit	Kirk Wong	
1998	Phoenix	Danny Cannon	
1998	All I Wanna Do	Sarah Kernochan	
1998	The Negotiator	F. Gary Gray	
1998	Lulu on the Bridge	Paul Auster	
1998	Bride of Chucky	Ronny Yu	Also conductor
1998	The Siege	Edward Zwick	
1999	Idle Hands	Rodman Flender	
1999	Buddy Boy	Mark Hanlon	Composed with Michael Brook and Brian Eno
1999	Three to Tango	Damon Santostefano	
1999	Bats	Louis Morneau	
1999	The 13th Warrior	John McTiernan	Rejected Score

==== 2000s ====
Year	Title	Director	Notes
2000	Pitch Black	David Twohy	
2000	Gossip	Davis Guggenheim	
2000	Titan A.E.	Don Bluth; Gary Goldman	First score for an animated film
2000	Calle 54	Fernando Trueba	
2000	Attraction	Russell DeGrazier	
2000	Red Planet	Antony Hoffman	
2001	Double Take	George Gallo	
2001	Blow	Ted Demme	
2001	Human Nature	Michel Gondry	
2001	Lara Croft: Tomb Raider	Simon West	
2002	Collateral Damage	Andrew Davis	
2002	High Crimes	Carl Franklin	
2002	Below	David Twohy	
2003	Daredevil	Mark Steven Johnson	
2003	Freddy vs. Jason	Ronny Yu	
2003	Out of Time	Carl Franklin	Also conductor.
2003	Open Water	Chris Kentis	
2004	Walking Tall	Kevin Bray	
2004	The Chronicles of Riddick	David Twohy	
2005	Assault on Precinct 13	Jean-François Richet	
2005	Sin City	Robert Rodriguez; Frank Miller	Composed with Robert Rodriguez and John Debney
2005	The Adventures of Sharkboy and Lavagirl in 3-D	Robert Rodriguez	Composed with Robert Rodriguez and John Debney
2005	Goal!	Danny Cannon	
2005	Harsh Times	David Ayer	
2005	The Fog	Rupert Wainwright	
2005	Æon Flux	Karyn Kusama	
2006	Bordertown	Gregory Nava	
2006	Man of the Year	Barry Levinson	
2007	Marigold	Willard Carroll	
2007	Planet Terror	Robert Rodriguez	
2007	The Condemned	Scott Wiper	
2007	Darfur Now	Ted Braun	
2007	Awake	Joby Harold	
2008	The Ruins	Carter Smith	
2008	Street Kings	David Ayer	
2008	Pineapple Express	David Gordon Green	
2008	Days of Wrath	Celia Fox	

==== 2010s ====
Year	Title	Director
2010	Unthinkable	Gregor Jordan
2010	The Experiment	Paul T. Scheuring
2010	Kites: The Remix	Anurag Basu
2010	Kites	Anurag Basu
2011	Shark Night	David R. Ellis
2013	Riddick	David Twohy

=== Television film ===
Year	Title	Director
1990	Psycho IV: The Beginning	Mick Garris
1995	Down Came a Blackbird	Jonathan Sanger
1998	Dennis the Menace Strikes Again	Charles T. Kanganis

=== Television series ===
Year	Title
1988	Bangkok Hilton
2000	Frank Herbert's Dune
2001	Anne Frank: The Whole Story
2002–2003	CSI: Miami
2008–2009	Eleventh Hour
2009–2010	The Forgotten
2009–2010	Dark Blue
2012	The River
2014–2015	Gotham

=== Video games ===
Year	Title
2005	Call of Duty 2
2005	Call of Duty 2: Big Red One
