= Stuart Crichton =

- Origin: Ayrshire, Scotland
- Genres: Pop, electronic, R&B
- Occupations: Songwriter; music producer
- Years active: 1989–present
- Label: Concord Music Publishing
- Member of: Narcotic Thrust
- Formerly of: Umboza

Stuart Crichton is a music producer and songwriter from Ayr, Scotland, currently based in Los Angeles, California.

== Career ==
Starting out in 1989 under the name Solo, Stuart self-released the Sample Free EP in 1990 which featured the song "Rainbow", using the theme tune from the children's show of the same name. It became a cult classic, with copies of the 12-inch vinyl selling for £150 plus at Eastern Blok record shop in Manchester, England. Follow-up records include "Come On" and "So Beautiful" in the early 1990s. In the mid-'90s, he formed the electronic/house music groups Umboza and Narcotic Thrust, the latter an anagram of Crichton's name. They released several singles, including "Safe from Harm", which reached number one on the Billboard Dance Club Songs chart in 2002, and "I Like It", which reached number 16 on the chart in 2004. At this time, Crichton was primarily producing dance tracks, releasing music on early progressive house labels such as FFRR, ZTT and Mushroom, and helping make Limbo Records a big part of the early '90s progressive house scene. In 1998, Crichton had a No. 17 UK Dance hit with the UK garage track "Happy Day", under the alias SJC.

Crichton has since written for and produced artists in a variety of genres, including Kylie Minogue, Backstreet Boys, Pet Shop Boys, Selena Gomez, Toni Braxton, Sugababes, DNCE and Kygo. He produced three songs on Stan Walker's 2010 album From the Inside Out, including the singles "Homesick" and "Choose You" (which he also co-wrote). He co-wrote and co-produced Kesha's single "Learn to Let Go", from her 2017 album Rainbow, as well as the track "Let 'em Talk" featuring Eagles of Death Metal. The album debuted at number 1 on the Billboard 200 albums chart, and was nominated for the 2018 Grammy Award for Best Pop Vocal Album. Three songs he wrote and produced were nominated at the 2019 Grammy Awards: "Don't Go Breaking My Heart" by the Backstreet Boys (Best Pop Duo/Group Performance); "Stargazing" by Kygo (Best Remixed Recording); and the album Sex & Cigarettes by Toni Braxton (Best R&B Album). He wrote and produced six songs on the 2019 Backstreet Boys album DNA, which debuted at number 1 on the Billboard 200 charts. Rolling Stone called Crichton the "common thread on DNA" and Vulture.com called the songs Crichton wrote for the album "the meat of DNA, a breezy collection of three-minute love songs that apply the singers’ airtight melodies to the sound of modern pop radio." Crichton wrote and produced Louis Tomlinson's 2019 single "Don't Let It Break Your Heart". He wrote and produced Kesha's 2019 single "Rich, White, Straight Men", and he wrote and produced four songs on her 2020 album High Road.

== Personal life ==
Crichton lived in London for 18 years, relocated to Sydney, Australia in 2008, and then in 2015 to Los Angeles, California.

== Awards ==
Year	Award	Category	Work	Result
2004	APRA Music Award	Most Performed Dance Work	"Tonight" by Amiel	Nominated
2004	International Dance Music Award	Best Pop Dance Track	"I Like It" by Narcotic Thrust	Won
2015	APRA Music Award	Country Work of the Year	"Here's To You and I" by The McClymonts	Nominated
2026	APRA Music Award	Most Performed Dance/Electronic Work	"Tell Me" by Sonny Fodera and Clementine Douglas	Won
2026	APRA Music Award	Most Performed Australian Work	"Tell Me" by Sonny Fodera and Clementine Douglas	Nominated
2026	APRA Music Award	Billion Streams List	"Stargazing" by Kygo ft. Justin Jesso	Won

== Discography ==
=== Singles ===
Title	Artist	Year	Peak positions		
Title	Artist	Year	US Dance	UK Singles Chart	UK Dance
"Cry India"	Umboza	1995	16	19	
"Sunshine"	Umboza	1996	–	7	
"Funky Acid Baby"	Narcotic Thrust	1996	–	96	
"Happy Day" (featuring Wayne Allen)	SJC	1998	–	–	17
"Safe from Harm" (featuring Yvonne John Lewis)	Narcotic Thrust	2002	1	24	
"I Like It"	Narcotic Thrust	2004	16	9	3
"When the Dawn Breaks"	Narcotic Thrust	2004	–	28	
"Waiting for You"	Narcotic Thrust	2006	–	–	

=== Writing and producing credits ===
Year	Artist	Album	Song	Credit
1993	Kirsty MacColl	Titanic Days		Producer, remixer
1993	Apollo 440	Astral America		Remixer
1994	Single Gun Theory	Flow, River of My Soul		Producer
1995	Keoki	All Mixed Up	"Justice Justice"	Writer, producer
1996	Right Said Fred	Smashing!		Producer
1999	Apollo 440	Gettin' High on Your Own Supply	"Stop the Rock"	Remixer/Co Producer
1999	Andy White	Andywhite.compilation		Producer, writer
2001	Christine Anu	Come My Way		Writer, producer, keyboards, vocals
2001	Andy White	Andy White	"Understand"	Producer, writer
2001	Andy White	Andy White	"Coz I'm Free"	Producer, writer
2002	Sugababes	Angels with Dirty Faces	"Round Round"	Remixer
2002	Pet Shop Boys	Release		Producer
2002	Kylie Minogue	Fever	"Can't Get Blue Monday Out of My Head"	Producer/Remixer
2003	Apollo 440	Dude Descending a Staircase	"Hustler Groove"	Writer, producer, keyboards, cello
2003	Amiel	Audio Out	"Side by Side"	Producer, drum programming, additional sounds
2003	Sugababes	Three	"Whatever Makes You Happy"	Writer, producer
2003	Sugababes	Three	"Million Different Ways"	Writer, producer
2003	Pet Shop Boys	PopArt	"Miracles"	Producer
2003	Pet Shop Boys	PopArt	"Flamboyant"	Producer
2003	Andy White	Boy 40	"Tell My Why"	Writer, producer
2003	Andy White	Boy 40	"Can't Hold Back"	Writer, producer
2006	Jamelia	Walk with Me	"No More"	Writer, producer
2006	Jamelia	Walk with Me	"Beware of the Dog"	Writer, producer
2006	Pet Shop Boys	Fundamental	"Minimal"	Producer, mixer
2007	Delta Goodrem	Delta	"Believe Again"	Writer, producer
2007	Delta Goodrem	Delta	"In This Life"	Writer, producer
2007	Delta Goodrem	Delta	"You Will Only Break My Heart"	Writer, producer
2007	Delta Goodrem	Delta	"The Guardian"	Writer, producer
2007	Delta Goodrem	Delta	"One Day"	Writer, producer
2007	Delta Goodrem	Delta	"Angels in the Room"	Writer, producer
2008	Brian McFadden	Set in Stone	"Twisted"	Writer, producer
2008	Brian McFadden	Set in Stone	"Room to Breathe"	Writer, producer
2008	Brian McFadden	Set in Stone	"Forgive Me Twice"	Writer, producer
2009	Kylie Minogue	Boombox		Producer
2009	Natalie Bassingthwaighte	1000 Stars	"Why Do I"	Writer, producer
2010	Stan Walker	From the Inside Out	"Homesick"	Writer, producer
2010	Stan Walker	From the Inside Out	"Choose You"	Writer, producer
2010	Stan Walker	From the Inside Out	"The One"	Writer, producer
2010	Guy Sebastian	Like It Like That		Producer
2011	Koreen Perry	Turning Point	"Don't Bring Me Down"	Writer
2011	Damien Leith	Roy: A Tribute to Roy Orbison		Producer
2012	Chimène Badi	Laisse les Dire	"Laisse les Dire"	Writer
2012	Kate Alexa	Infatuation	"Buttercup"	Writer
2012	Kate Alexa	Infatuation	"I'm Falling"	Writer, producer
2013	Tina Arena	Reset	"Love You Less"	Writer
2013	Selena Gomez	Stars Dance	"Lover in Me"	Writer
2015	Gin Wigmore	Blood to Bone	"Black Parade"	Writer, producer
2015	Gin Wigmore	Blood to Bone	"Written in the Water"	Writer, producer
2015	Gin Wigmore	Blood to Bone	"DFU"	Writer, producer
2015	Jamie McDell	Ask Me Anything	"Falling"	Writer, producer
2015	Jamie McDell	Ask Me Anything	"This Time"	Writer, producer
2015	Jamie McDell	Ask Me Anything	"Back of My Mind"	Writer, producer
2015	Jamie McDell	Ask Me Anything	"Moon Shines Red"	Writer, producer
2015	Jamie McDell	Ask Me Anything	"Crash"	Writer, producer
2015	Jamie McDell	Ask Me Anything	"Six Miles"	Writer, producer
2015	Jamie McDell	Ask Me Anything	"My Old Hands"	Writer, producer
2016	Ferras		"Closer"	Writer, producer
2016	Ferras		"Medicine"	Writer, producer
2016	Havana Brown		"Like Lightning"	Writer, producer
2016	tyDi & Olivia Somerlyn		"Only"	Writer, producer
2016	Guy Sebastian	Part 1 (EP)	"Set in Stone"	Writer, producer
2016	Sweet California	3	"Hum"	Writer, producer
2016	Cole Plante feat. Bobi Andonov		"Teardrops"	Co-producer
2017	Kesha	Rainbow	"Learn to Let Go"	Writer, producer
2017	Kesha	Rainbow	"Let 'em Talk" (feat. Eagles of Death Metal)	Writer, producer
2017	Kygo ft. Justin Jesso	Stargazing	"Stargazing"	Writer, producer
2017	Kesha	The Greatest Showman: Reimagined	"This Is Me"	Vocal production
2018	Toni Braxton	Sex & Cigarettes	"Coping"	Writer, producer
2018	Sigrid	Raw	"I Don't Want to Know"	Producer
2018	Backstreet Boys	DNA	"Don't Go Breaking My Heart"	Writer, producer
2018	Backstreet Boys	DNA	"Chateau"	Writer, producer
2018	Backstreet Boys	DNA	"The Way It Was"	Writer, producer
2018	Backstreet Boys	DNA	"OK"	Writer, producer
2018	Backstreet Boys	DNA	"Is It Just Me"	Vocal producer
2018	Backstreet Boys	DNA	"Best Days"	Writer, producer
2018	Conrad Sewell	Ghosts & Heartaches	"Healing Hands"	Writer, producer
2018	DNCE	People To People	"Still Good"	Writer, producer
2019	Oliver Heldens		"Summer Lover"	Writer, producer
2019	Robin Schulz	IIII	"All This Love"	Writer, producer
2019	Kesha		"Rich, White, Straight Men"	Writer, producer
2019	Louis Tomlinson	Walls	"Don't Let It Break Your Heart"	Writer, producer
2019	The Chainsmokers	World War Joy	"See The Way" (ft. Sabrina Claudio)	Writer, producer
2019	Pete Tong	Chilled Classics	"Darkest Days"	Writer, producer
2019	Mads Langer	Me Without You EP	"Me Without You"	Writer, producer
2019	Mr. Belt & Wezol		"Not Dancing"	Writer, producer
2020	Kesha	High Road	"Honey"	Writer, producer
2020	Kesha	High Road	"Birthday Suit"	Writer, producer
2020	Kesha	High Road	"The Potato Song (Cuz I Want To)"	Writer, producer
2020	Kesha	High Road	"BFF" ft. Wrabel	Writer, producer
2020	Galantis		"The Lake" ft. Wrabel	Writer, co-producer
2020	James Newman		"Enough"	Writer, producer
2020	Tiësto	The London Sessions	"God Is a Dancer" ft. Mabel	Mixer
2020	Tiësto	The London Sessions	"Round & Round" ft. Galxara	Writer, producer
2020	Mads Langer		"21:4"	Writer, producer
2022	Kygo ft. Stuart Crichton	Thrill of the Chase	"All for Love"	Writer, producer, singer
2022	MK & Burns ft. Teddy Swims		"Better"	Writer, producer
2022	Illenium ft. Teddy Swims	Illenium	"All That Really Matters"	Writer, producer
2022	NCT 127	2 Baddies	"Gold Dust"	Writer, producer
2022	Benny Benassi ft. Bryn Christopher		"One More Night"	Writer, producer
2022	Matoma		"The Power"	Writer, producer
2022	Teddy Swims	Sleep is Exhausting	"Devil in a Dress"	Writer, producer
2022	Matteo Bocelli	Three Thousand Years of Longing	"Cautionary Tale (Film Version)"	Writer, producer
2022	Matteo Bocelli		"Close"	Writer, producer
2022	Martin Jasper	Papercut	"Empty House"	Writer, producer
2023	Armin van Buuren ft. Wrabel	Feel Again	"Feel Again"	Writer, producer
2023	Armin van Buuren & Matoma ft. Teddy Swims	Feel Again	"Easy to Love"	Writer, producer
2023	Armin van Buuren ft. Stuart Crichton	Feel Again	"Dayglow"	Writer, producer, singer
2023	Nick Carter		"Hurts to Love You"	Writer, producer
2023	Kesha	Gag Order	"Something to Believe In"	Writer, producer
2023	Kesha	Gag Order	"Eat the Acid"	Writer, producer
2023	David Guetta & MORTEN		"Something to Hold On To"	Writer, producer
2023	The Rose		"You're Beautiful"	Writer, producer
2023	Lost Frequencies	All Stand Together	"All Stand Together"	Writer, producer, vocals
2023	Sam Fischer	I Love You, Please Don't Hate Me	"Somebody Cares"	Writer, producer
2024	Frank Walker ft. Nate Smith	Origin	"Missing You"	Writer, producer
2024	Clementine Douglas		"Riddles"	Writer, producer
2024	Clementine Douglas		"Slippin"	Writer, producer
2024	Ian Asher ft. Giulia Be		"Let's Go (Magalenha)"	Writer, producer
2024	Matteo Bocelli and Sofia Carson		"If I Knew"	Writer, producer
2024	Lost Frequencies		"Love Is the Only Thing"	Writer, producer
2024	Kygo ft. Matt Hansen	Kygo	"Love Me Now Or Lose Me Later"	Writer, producer
2024	WOOSUNG	4444	"Before We Die"	Writer, producer
2024	WOOSUNG	4444	"Found You"	Writer, producer
2024	WOOSUNG	4444	"44 (Forget Forever)"	Writer, producer
2024	Pixie Lott	Encino	"Anybody Else"	Writer, producer
2025	Sonny Fodera & Clementine Douglas		"Tell Me"	Writer, producer
2025	J. Worra		"Crushin"	Writer, producer
2025	Kesha	.	"LOVE FOREVER."	Writer, producer
2025	Kesha	.	"TOO HARD."	Writer, producer
2025	Sonny Fodera, D.O.D, Poppy Baskcomb	Can We Do It All Again?	"Think About Us"	Co-producer / co-writer
2025	Giulia Be		"Poltergeist"	Producer / co-writer
2025	Giulia Be		"Fool for Love"	Producer / co-writer
2025	AR/CO x Sistek		"Sound of the Sunrise"	Co-producer / co-writer
2025	Chris Murphy		"Under the Sky"	Co-producer / co-writer
2026	Martin Garrix		"Catharina"	Producer / writer
2026	Frank Walker ft. Bryce Vine	Run With the Sun	"Run With the Sun"	Producer / writer
2026	Frank Walker ft. Salem Ilese	Oasis	"All Cried Out"	Producer / writer
2026	Frank Walker ft. Zeke Finn	Oasis	"Sky"	Producer / writer
2026	Frank Walker ft. Nathan Nicholson	Oasis	"What Love Feels Like"	Producer / writer
