= Amiel =

Amiel is both a surname and a given name. It is related to the Hebrew name Ammiel. Notable people with the name include:

Surname:

- Audrey Amiel (born 1987), French rugby sevens player.
- Barbara Amiel (born 1940), writer and wife of Conrad Black
- David Amiel (born 1992), French politician
- Eliahu Amiel (1925–2001), Israeli basketball player
- Francisco Amiel (born 1996), Portuguese basketball player
- Gausbert Amiel (fl. 13th century), troubadour
- Henri-Frédéric Amiel (1821–1881), Swiss philosopher, poet and critic
- Irit Amiel (Irena Librowicz, 1931–2021), Polish-born Israeli poet, writer
- Jack Amiel (fl. 20th–21st century), American screenwriter
- Jon Amiel (born 1948), British director
- Josette Amiel (born 1930), French ballerina
- Louis-Félix Amiel (1802–1864), French portrait painter
- Michel Amiel (born 1954), French politician
- Moshe Avigdor Amiel (1882–1945), Zionist Orthodox rabbi
- Nathalie Amiel (born 1970), former French rugby union player
- Oren Amiel (born 1971), Israeli basketball coach
- Stephanie Amiel (born 1954), British physician and academic
- Thierry Amiel (born 1982), French singer

Given name:

- Amiel Daemion (born 1979), American-Australian pop singer
- Amiel Sol (born 1999), Filipino indie singer-songwriter and musician
- Amiel Shomrony (Emil Schwartz, 1917–2009), Yugoslav-born Israeli Holocaust survivor
- Amiel Vardi (fl. 20th–21st century), Israeli classical scholar
- Amiel Weeks Whipple (1817–1863), American military officer and topographical engineer
