= Lorković =

Lorković is a Croatian surname. The surname may refer to:

- Blaž Lorković (1839–1892), Croatian economist
- Hrvoje Lorković (1930–2018), Croatian physiologist and writer
- Ivan Lorković (1876–1926), Croatian politician
- Melita Lorković (1907–1987), Croatian pianist
- Mladen Lorković (1909–1945), Croatian politician
- Radoslav Lorković (born 1958), Croatian pianist and accordionist
- Zdravko Lorković (1900–1998), Croatian entomologist
- Edvard Lorkovic (born 1972), Canadian philosopher
