= Luciano Moše Prelević =

Croatian rabbi

Rabbi Luciano Moše Prelević

Personal life
- Born: 1953 (age 72–73) Zagreb, SFR Yugoslavia, (now Croatia)
- Education: Shehebar Sephardic Rabbinical College Jerusalem

Religious life
- Religion: Judaism
- Denomination: Orthodox Judaism

Jewish leader
- Predecessor: Rabbi Zvi Eliezer Alonie
- Synagogue: Jewish community Zagreb Synagogue
- Position: Rabbi
- Began: 2008
- Other: Chief Rabbi of the Montenegro Jewish community (2013–present)
- Residence: Zagreb

Rabbi Luciano Moše Prelević (born 1953 in Zagreb) is the Croatian rabbi of the Jewish community in Zagreb and chief rabbi of the Montenegro Jewish community.

== Early life and family ==
From his mother's side of the family, he is a descendant of the Split Jewish family Levi. His great-grandfather, Mojsije Levi, was a rabbi in Split in the early 20th century. Levi came to Split from the island of Corfu, Greece, where he married a daughter of Marijo Goldstein, one of the most popular Split photographers, who arrived in Split from Poland. Prelević spent his youth in Split. He studied architecture in Split and Zagreb.

== Later years ==
Prelevic worked at the Croatian oil and gas company INA.

His cousin introduced him to the Jewish community of Zagreb, where he became more interested in Judaism. In the Jewish community of Zagreb Prelević intensified his religious life and devoted himself to the study of the Torah. Prelević read English-language literature translated from Hebrew, and as he wanted to read the originals, he started to learn Hebrew.

In 1999 Kotel Da-Don, another Croatian rabbi, suggested that he study for one year in Jerusalem to become a teacher, after which he would return to Zagreb. Prelevic decided after this to become a rabbi. The Jewish community of Zagreb supported his studies with a scholarship. Prelevic spent eight years in the Ashkenazi Yeshiva and graduated in 2007 as the top student in his class. In the study the subjects that Prelević completed were Halakha and Jewish philosophy. His rabbinical diploma was conferred by a rabbi of the Yeshiva.

In 2008 he was commissioned into the service as a rabbi of Zagreb's Jewish community. Prelević is the first Croatian-born rabbi of Zagreb's Jewish community since rabbi Miroslav Šalom Freiberger, who was killed in the Auschwitz concentration camp. In 2013 Prelević was named chief rabbi of the Montenegro Jewish community.
