= Bienenfeld =

Bienenfeld is a surname. Notable people with the surname include:

- Hedy Bienenfeld (1907–1976), Austrian-American Olympic swimmer
- Jakov Bienenfeld (1948–2016), Croatian businessman
