= Pasquet =

Pasquet is a surname. Notable people with the surname include:

- Alix Pasquet (1919–1958), Haitian pilot, soccer player, and political revolutionary
- Isabelle Pasquet (born 1962), French Senator
- Nicolás Pasquet (born 1958), Uruguayan conductor
- Ope Pasquet (born 1955), Uruguayan politician and lawyer
