= Županja =

- Town
- Grad Županja; Town of Županja
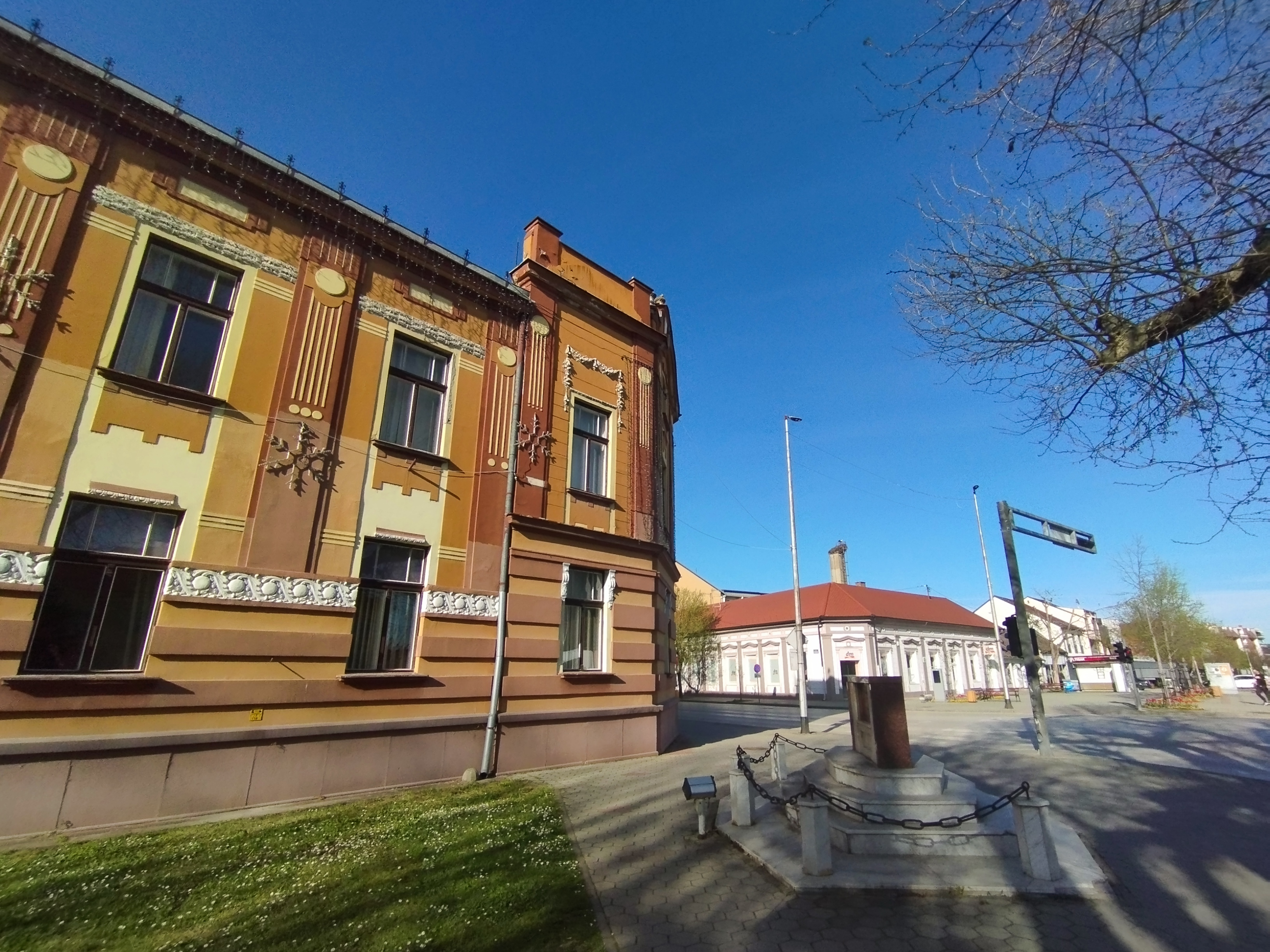
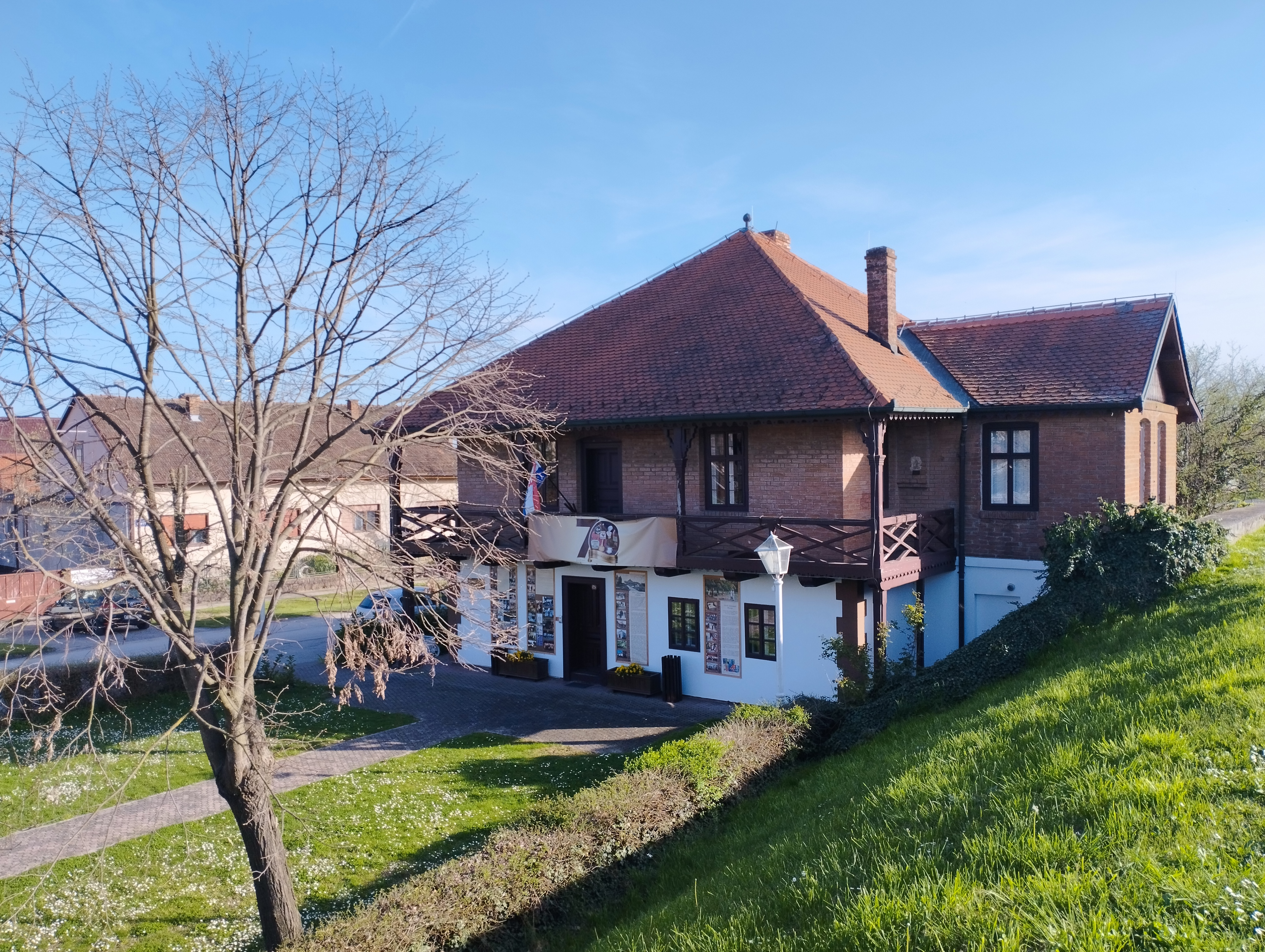
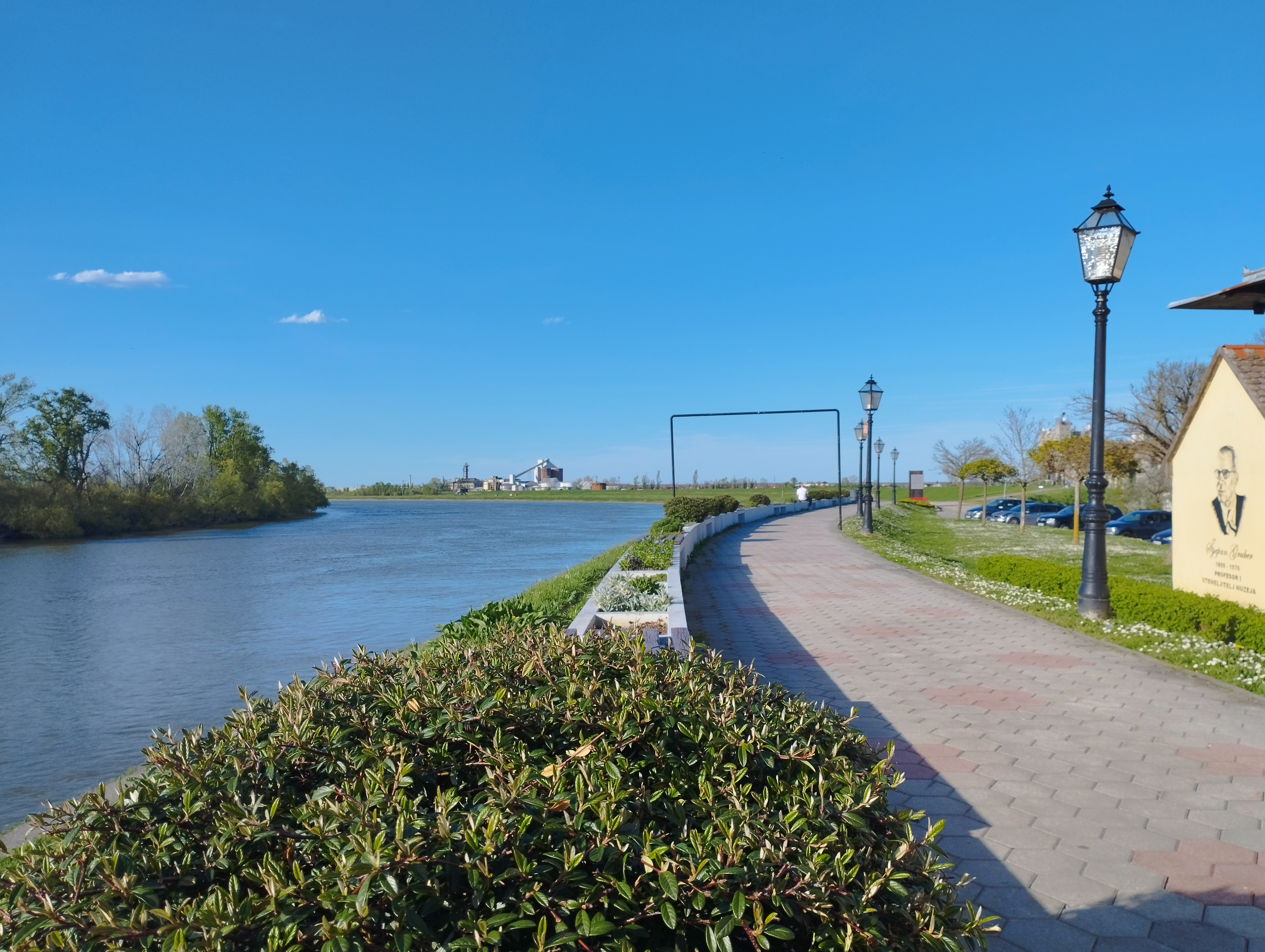
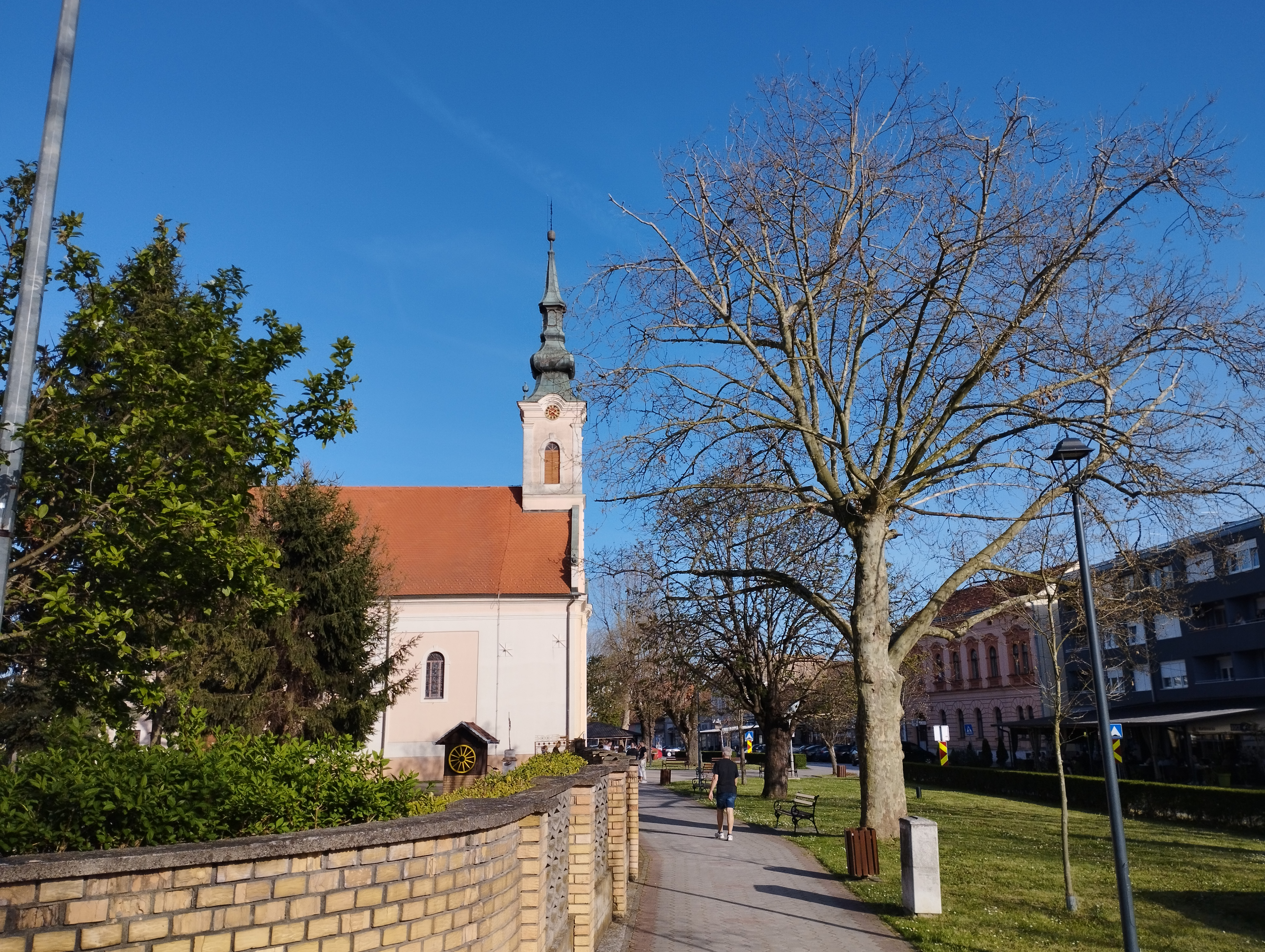
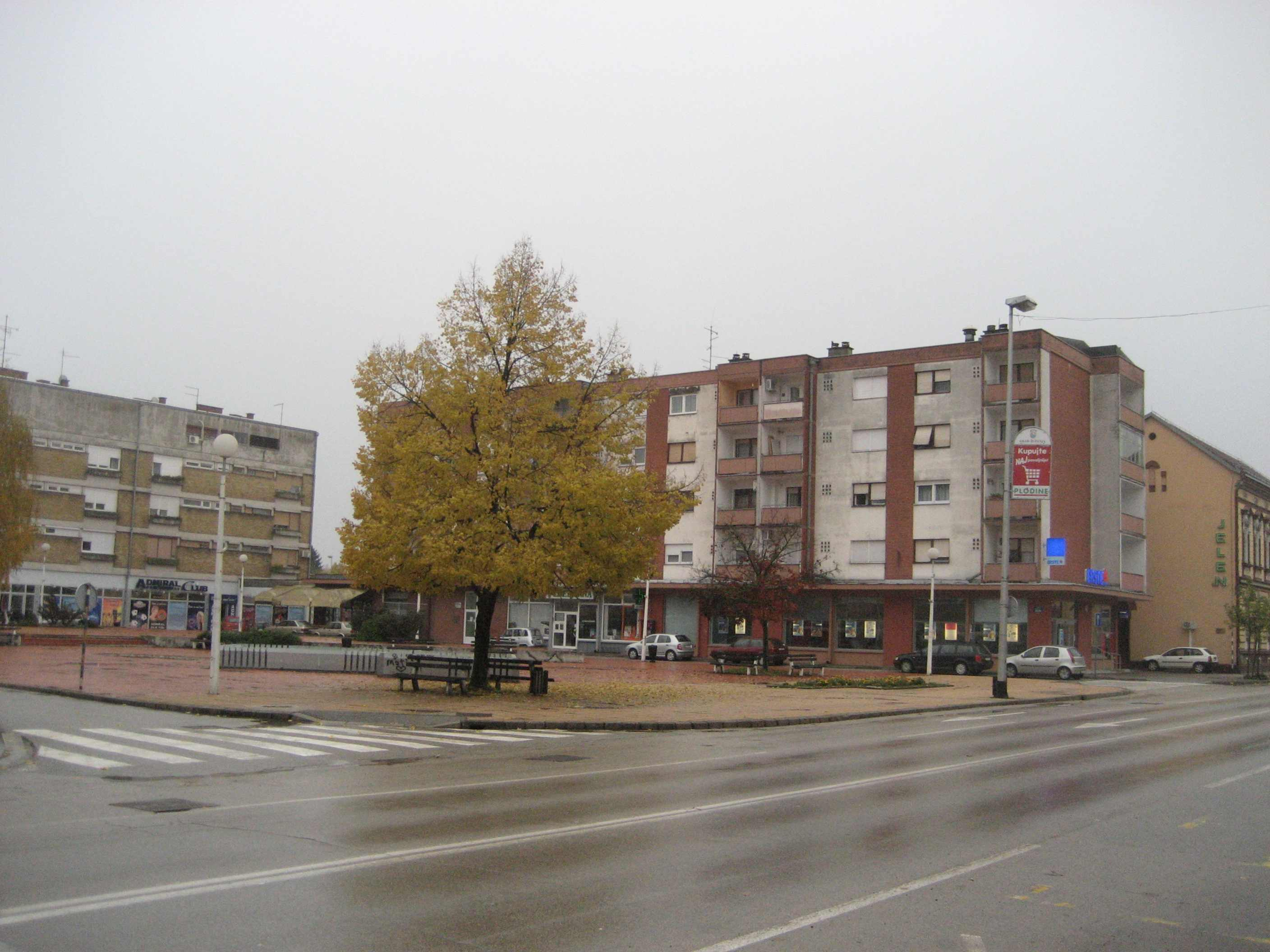
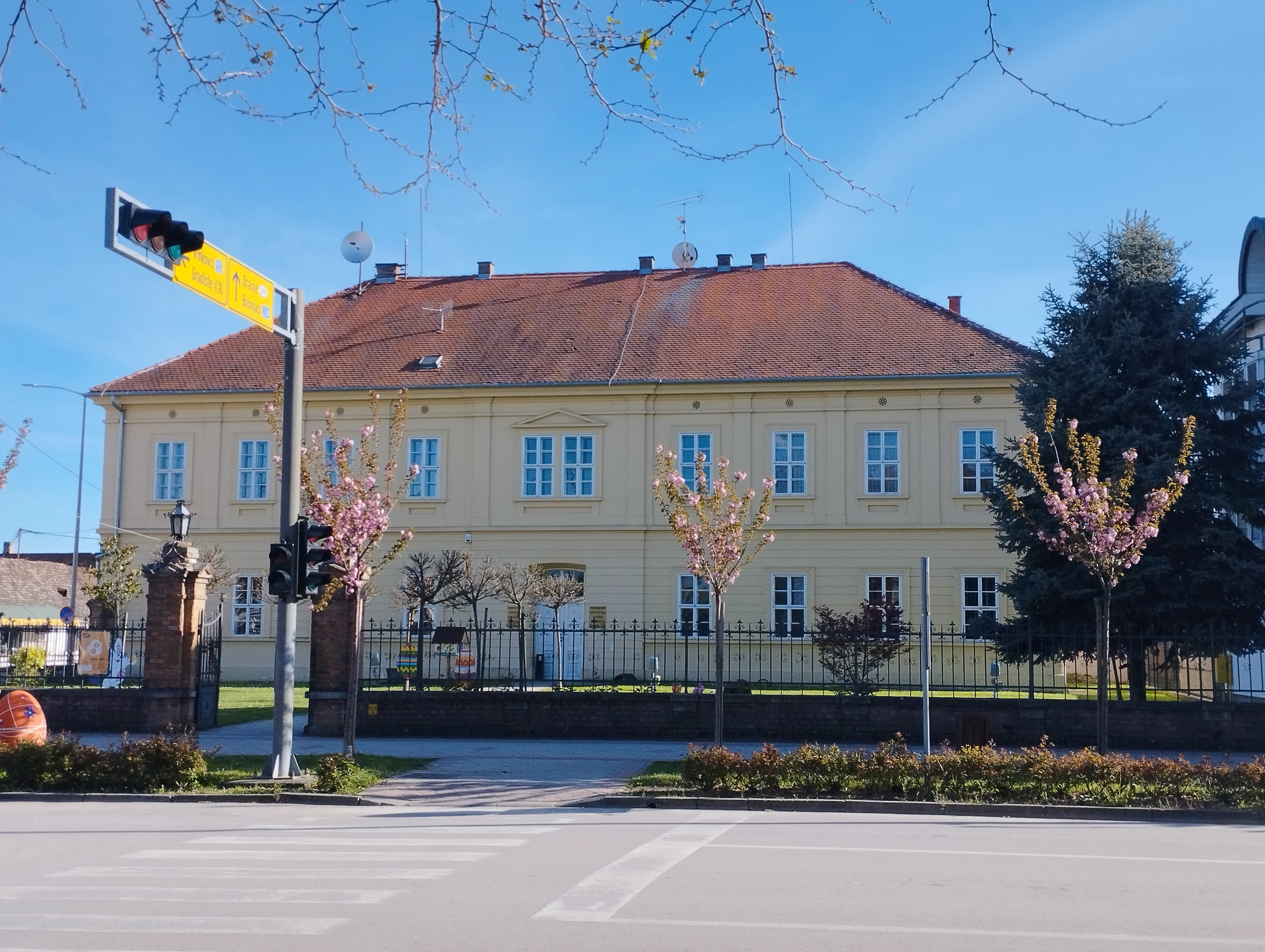
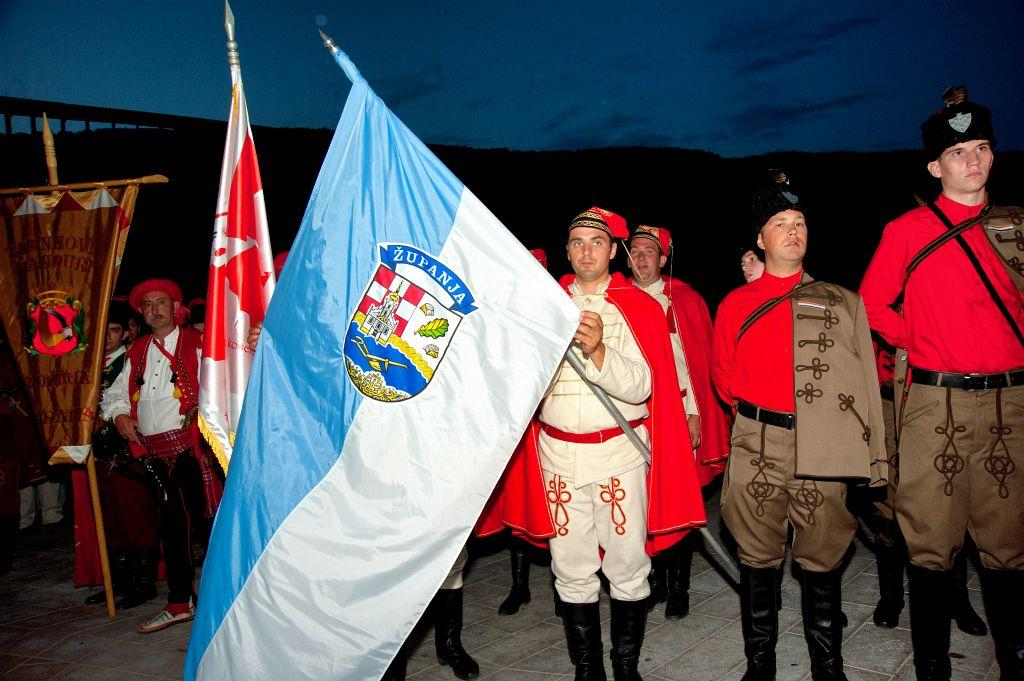
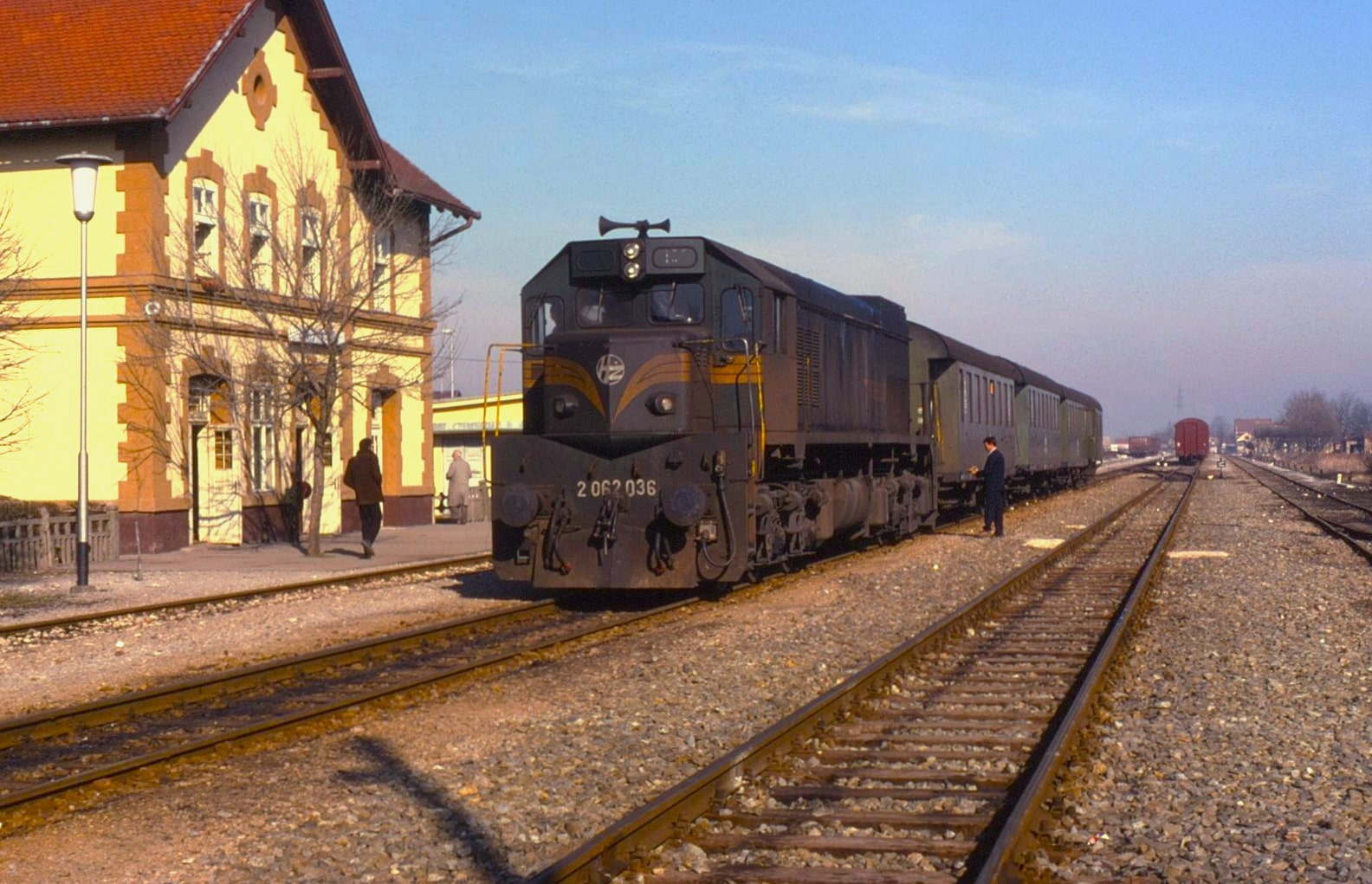
- Županja

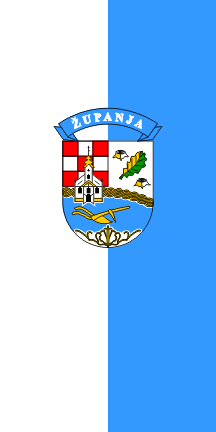
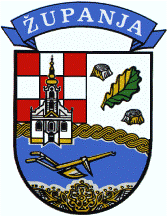
- Flag Coat of arms
- Interactive map of Županja
- Location of Županja in Croatia Županja (Croatia) Županja (Europe)
- Coordinates: 45°04′12″N 18°42′00″E
- Country: Croatia
- Region: Slavonia (Syrmia, Posavina)
- County: Vukovar-Syrmia County

Government
  - Type: Mayor-council
  - Mayor: Damir Juzbašić (Ind.)

Area
  - Town: 50.2 km^{2} (19.4 sq mi)
  - Urban: 50.2 km^{2} (19.4 sq mi)

Population (2021)
  - Town: 9,153
  - Density: 182/km^{2} (472/sq mi)
  - Urban: 9,153
  - Urban density: 182/km^{2} (472/sq mi)
- Time zone: UTC+1 (CET)
  - Summer (DST): UTC+2 (CEST)
- Postal codes: HR-32 270
- Area code: +385 32
- License plates: ŽU
- Website: zupanja.hr

Županja (pronounced [ʒǔpaɲa], Hungarian: Zsupanya, German: Schaupanie) is a town in eastern Slavonia, Croatia, located 254 km east of Zagreb. It is administratively part of the Vukovar-Syrmia County. It is inhabited by 12,090 people (2011).

Županja lies on the Sava river opposite Bosnia and Herzegovina, and is the site of a border-crossing bridge with the town of Orašje in Bosnia and Herzegovina. The A3 highway Zagreb-Slavonski Brod-Belgrade passes north of it, and the city is also reachable by a local railroad from Vinkovci as well as the state road D55. The 2011 census recorded 96.72% Croats in the municipality.

== History ==
Županja was ruled by Ottoman Empire between 1536 and 1687 as part of Sanjak of Syrmia. Since the Treaty of Karlowitz in 1699, until 1918, Županja (named ZUPANJE when a post-office was opened in 1861) remained in the Austrian monarchy (Kingdom of Croatia-Slavonia after the compromise of 1867), in the Slavonian Military Frontier, under the administration of the Brooder Grenz-Infanterie-Regiment N°VII until 1881. In the late 19th and early 20th century, Županja was a district capital in the Kingdom Syrmia County. From 1929 to 1939, Županja was part of the Sava Banovina and from 1939 to 1941 of the Banovina of Croatia within the Kingdom of Yugoslavia.

The DVD "Sladorana" was founded in 1947.

== Climate ==
Since records began in 1981, the highest temperature recorded at the local weather station was 40.5 °C (104.9 °F), on 24 July 2007. The coldest temperature was −22.8 °C (−9.0 °F), on 9 February 2012.

== Demographics ==
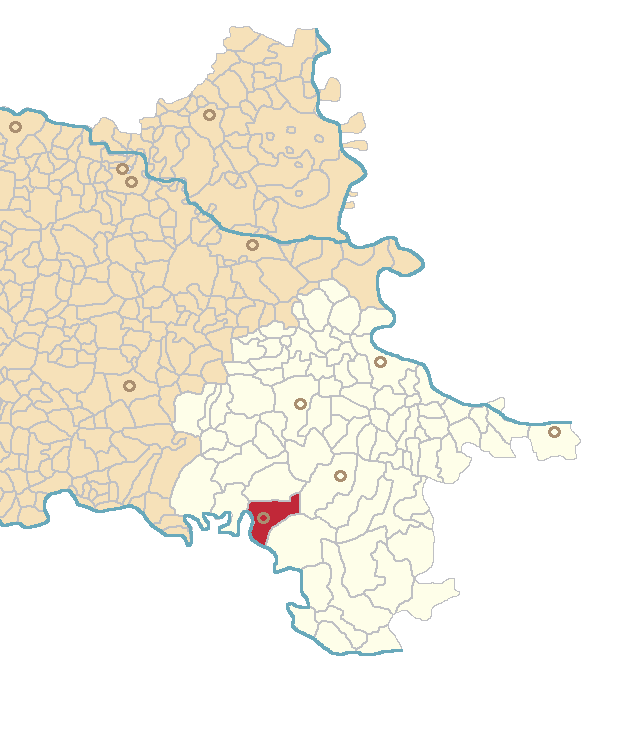
The Županja municipality includes the settlement of Županja (marked red) on this map of settlements of eastern Slavonia.

Historical populations of Županja

Year	Pop.	±%
1857	2,211	—
1869	2,534	+14.6%
1880	2,611	+3.0%
1890	3,467	+32.8%
1900	3,630	+4.7%
1910	3,338	−8.0%
1921	3,264	−2.2%
1931	3,508	+7.5%
1948	4,695	+33.8%

Year	Pop.	±%
1953	5,391	+14.8%
1961	7,024	+30.3%
1971	8,865	+26.2%
1981	10,263	+15.8%
1991	11,947	+16.4%
2001	13,775	+15.3%
2011	12,090	−12.2%
2021	9,246	−23.5%

Source: Naselja i stanovništvo Republike Hrvatske 1857–2001, Croatian Bureau of Statistics, Zagreb, 2005

Town of Županja: Population trends 1857–2021
v

population	3831	4337	4280	5161	5347	5019	4747	5103	6537	7391	9339	11476	12679	14435	16383	12090	9153
	1857	1869	1880	1890	1900	1910	1921	1931	1948	1953	1961	1971	1981	1991	2001	2011	2021

Sources: Croatian Bureau of Statistics publications

== Sports ==
NK Graničar is the major football club who play in the third tier of the Croatian football pyramid.

== Gallery ==
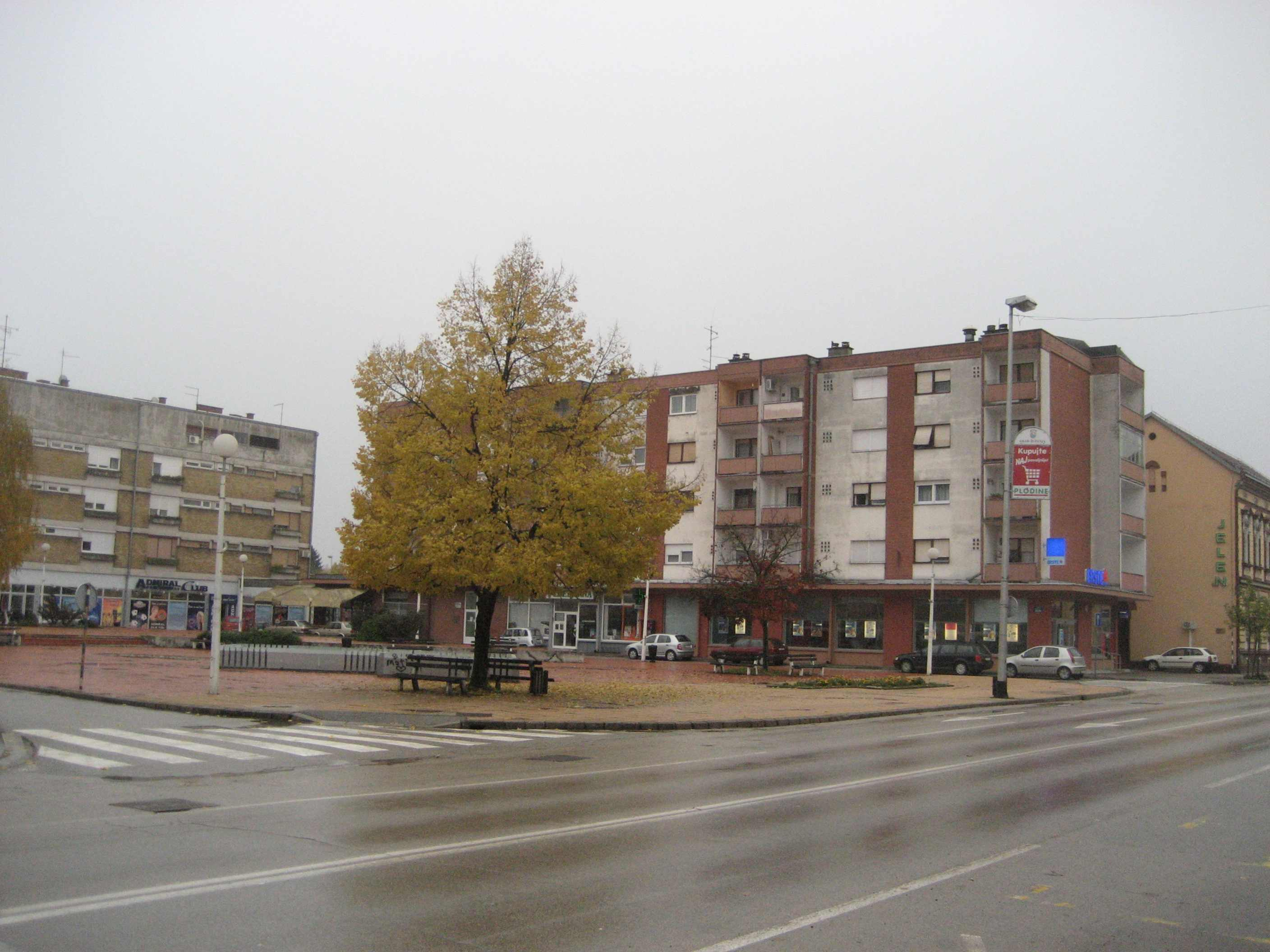
Residential buildings

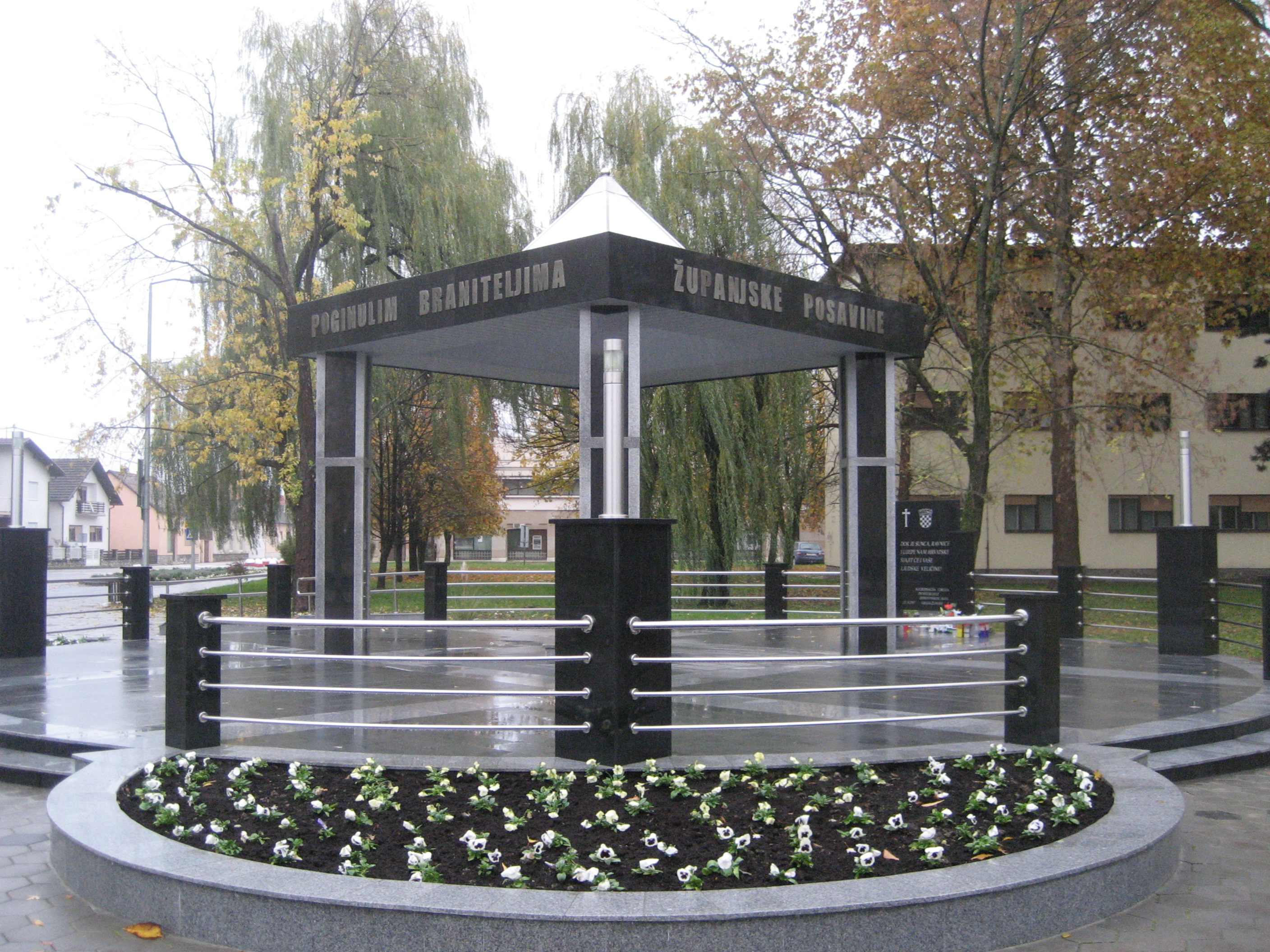
Defenders memorial

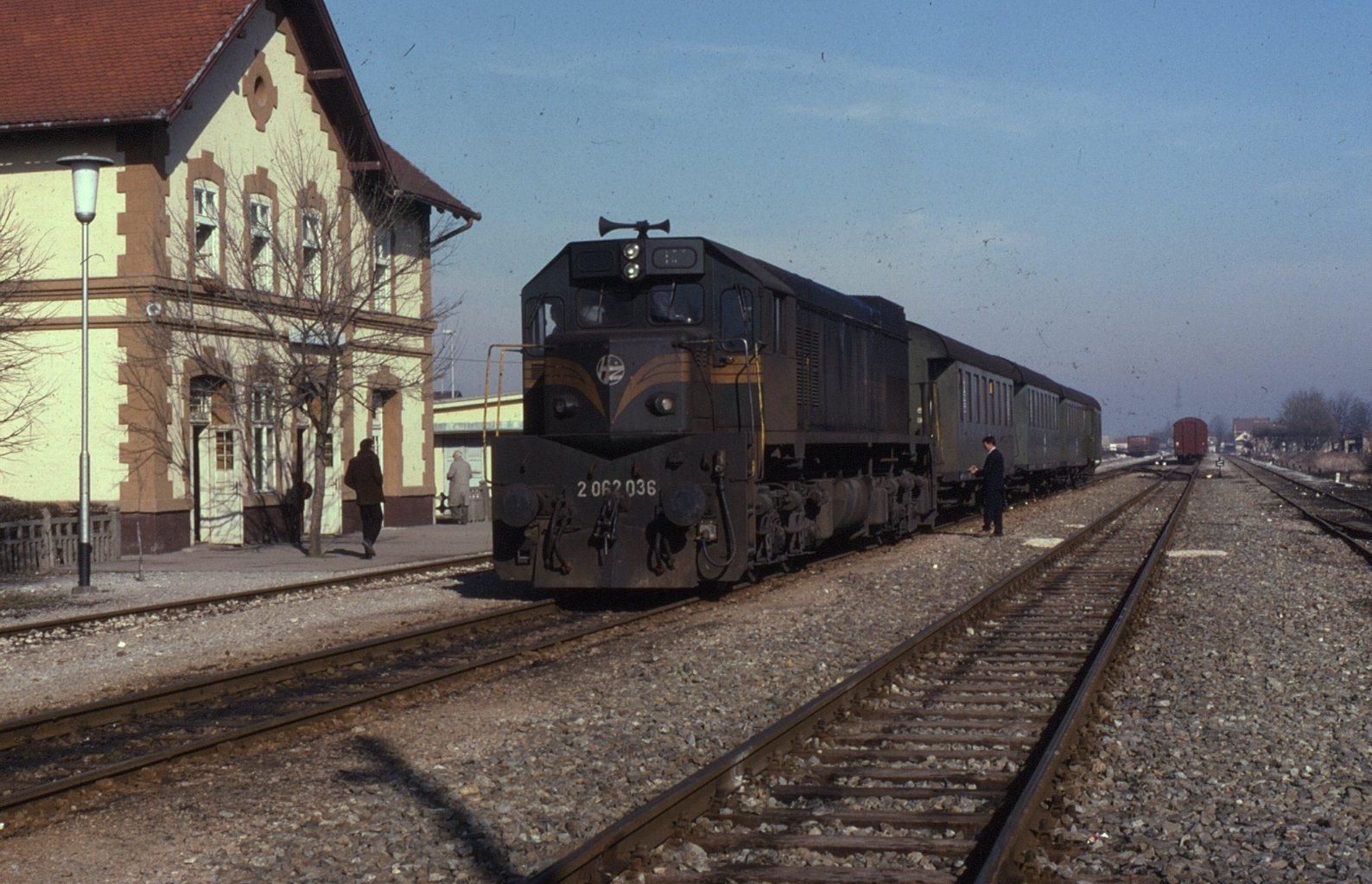
Županja railway station, 1997

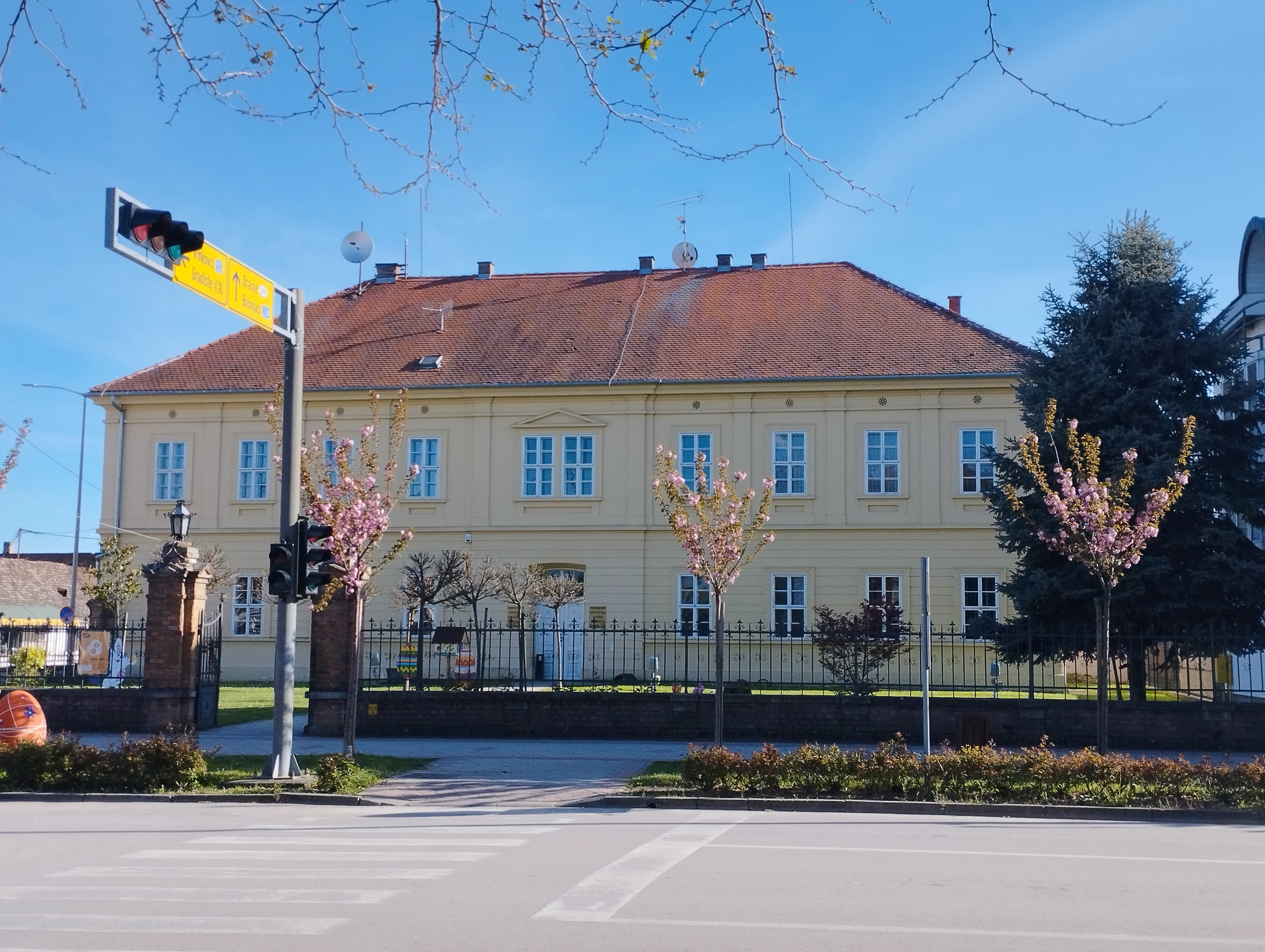
Town library

== Notable people ==
- Pero Galić, Croatian singer and founder of rock band Opća Opasnost
- Srećko Albini (1869–1933), Croatian composer, conductor, and music publisher
- Melita Lorković, Croatian female pianist, university professor and music pedagogue (1907-1987)
- Amiel Shomrony - cantor of the Jewish community in Zagreb and secretary of Zagreb's chief rabbi Miroslav Šalom Freiberger during the World War II
- Dario Župarić, Croatian footballer (b. 1992)

== See also ==
- Spačva basin
