= I Like It (Narcotic Thrust song) =

2004 single by Narcotic Thrust

- UK maxi-CD cover artwork

Single by Narcotic Thrust
- Released: 5 April 2004
- Studio: SCS (Fulham, London)
- Length: 7:25 (original version); 3:06 (radio edit)
- Label: free2air
- Songwriters: Andy Morris; Stuart Crichton; Robert de Fresnes
- Producers: Andy Morris; Stuart Crichton

Narcotic Thrust singles chronology
"Safe from Harm" (2002)	"I Like It" (2004)	"When the Dawn Breaks" (2005)

Music video
- "I Like It" on YouTube

"I Like It" is a song by English electronic music duo Narcotic Thrust, with British singer Yvonne John Lewis on vocals. The song was written by Andy Morris, Stuart Crichton and Robert de Fresnes, while Morris and Crichton produced it. Andrew Levy from acid jazz group the Brand New Heavies played bass guitar on the song while ex-member Jan Kincaid handled the percussion.

Released as a standalone single on 5 April 2004, "I Like It" debuted and peaked at number nine on the UK Singles Chart six days later, becoming the duo's sole top-10 hit in the UK. The single also reached the top 20 in Flanders, Greece, the Netherlands, and Romania, as well as on three US Billboard dance charts. A music video was made for the song, featuring several female cheerleaders with red pom-poms dancing in a bright grey room filled with confetti.

== Composition ==
Composed in the key of F-sharp minor, "I Like It" has a tempo of 130 beats per minute. The original mix is seven minutes and twenty-five seconds long while the version released to radio is three minutes and six seconds in length.

== Track listings ==
UK CD1

1. "I Like It" (radio edit) – 3:06
2. "I Like It" (M Black remix) – 7:18
3. "I Like It" (Tom Mangan remix) – 8:03
4. "I Like It" (original mix) – 7:24
5. "I Like It" (Sinewave Surfers 2am mix) – 5:33
6. "I Like It" (video, photo gallery, lyrics and screensaver)

UK CD2

1. "I Like It" (radio edit) – 3:06
2. "I Like It" (original CD mix) – 4:52

UK 12-inch single

A1. "I Like It" (original mix) – 7:24
A2. "I Like It" (Sinewave Surfers 2am mix) – 5:33
B1. "I Like It" (M Black remix) – 7:18
B2. "I Like It" (Tom Mangan remix) – 5:42

Australian CD single

1. "I Like It" (radio edit) – 3:06
2. "I Like It" (Sinewave Surfers mix) – 5:34
3. "I Like It" (Tom Mangan remix) – 8:02
4. "I Like It" (original mix) – 7:25

== Credits and personnel ==
Credits are adapted from the UK CD1 liner notes.

Studios

- Recorded at SCS Studios (Fulham, London, England)
- Mixed at Sahara Studios (Fulham, London, England)
- Mastered at 360 Mastering (Hastings, East Sussex, England)

Personnel

- Andy Morris – writing, production
- Stuart Crichton – writing, production, mixing
- Robert de Fresnes – writing
- Yvonne John Lewis – vocals
- Andrew Levy – bass
- Jan Kincaid – percussion
- Pete Craigie – mixing
- Richard Beetham – mastering

== Charts ==
=== Weekly charts ===
Chart (2004–2005)	Peak position
Australia (ARIA)	68
Belgium (Ultratop 50 Flanders)	17
CIS Airplay (TopHit)	10
Germany (GfK)	91
Greece (IFPI)	10
Ireland (IRMA)	50
Netherlands (Dutch Top 40)	10
Netherlands (Single Top 100)	15
Romania (Romanian Top 100)	13
Russia Airplay (TopHit)	9
Scotland Singles (OCC)	9
UK Singles (OCC)	9
UK Dance (OCC)	3
UK Indie (OCC)	1
Ukraine Airplay (TopHit)	18
US Dance Club Play (Billboard) P. Lorimer/D. Coleman mixes	16
US Dance Radio Airplay (Billboard)	5
US Dance Singles Sales (Billboard) with "When the Dawn Breaks"	8

Chart (2025)	Peak position
Poland (Polish Airplay Top 100)	52

=== Year-end charts ===
Chart (2004)	Position
Belgium (Ultratop 50 Flanders)	78
CIS Airplay (TopHit)	43
Netherlands (Single Top 100)	76
Russia Airplay (TopHit)	27
UK Singles (OCC)	159
US Dance Radio Airplay (Billboard)	26

Chart (2005)	Position
Russia Airplay (TopHit)	166
US Dance Radio Airplay (Billboard)	45

== Release history ==
Region	Date	Format(s)	Label(s)	Ref.
United Kingdom	5 April 2004	12-inch vinyl; CD	free2air	
Australia	2 August 2004	CD	Superphunk	
