= Michel Amiel =

French politician

Member of the French Senate for Bouches-du-Rhône
- Incumbent
- Assumed office 1 October 2014
- Preceded by: Isabelle Pasquet

Personal details
- Born: 3 July 1954 (age 71) Cannes, France
- Party: La République En Marche! (2017-2020)

Michel Amiel (born 1954) is a French politician who has been serving as a member of the French Senate since 2014. From 2017 until 2020, he was a member of La République En Marche! (LREM).

== Early life ==
Amiel was born on 3 July 1954.

== Career ==
Amiel has served as a member of the French Senate since 2014. He is also the Mayor of Les Pennes-Mirabeau.

Ahead of the Republicans' 2016 primaries, Amiel endorsed Nathalie Kosciusko-Morizet as the party's candidate for the 2017 French presidential election.

In March 2020, Amiel left LREM after Prime Minister Édouard Philippe announced he would push through a controversial pensions bill by executive decree.
