= No More (Jamelia song) =

Single by Jamelia

from the album Walk with Me
- Released: 19 March 2007
- Genre: Baroque pop; R&B
- Length: 2:52 (radio version); 2:54 (album version)
- Label: Parlophone
- Songwriters: Jet Black; Jean-Jacques Burnel; Hugh Cornwell; Stuart Crichton; Jamelia Davis; Dave Greenfield; Tommy Lee James
- Producer: Crichton

Jamelia singles chronology
"Beware of the Dog" (2006)	"No More" (2007)

"No More" is a song by English singer Jamelia. It was written by Jamelia, Stuart Crichton, and Tommy Lee James for her third studio album Walk with Me (2006), while production was helmed by Crichton. The song is built around a sample of "Golden Brown" (1982) by English rock band The Stranglers. Due to the inclusion of the sample, Jean-Jacques Burnel, Hugh Cornwell, Jet Black, and Dave Greenfield are also credited as songwriters. A slightly altered single mix of "No More" was released as the album's third and final single in March 2007.

== Critical reception ==
"No More" generally received positive reviews from critics. Website Digital Spy described it as "a fantastically funky, deliciously soulful piece of pop music." The Guardian stated "Jamelia emerges the richer from all the thieving, less mumsy and more roguish." While The Times stated the track was "oddly dignified gospel."

== Chart performance ==
Like the previous two singles from Walk with Me, "Something About You" and "Beware of the Dog", "No More" received a positive amount of airplay, being A-listed on BBC Radio 2, and C-listed on BBC Radio 1 in the United Kingdom. Despite the radio support, "No More" became Jamelia's lowest charting single since "Boy Next Door" peaked at number 42 in 2000, peaking at number 43, and only her third to miss the top forty. "No More" peaked at number 43.

== Music video ==
The accompanying video for "No More" was directed by Paul Gore and shot in London in late January 2007. Production on the video was overseen by Flynn Productions. It features Jamelia walking through a darkened room and turning a light switch on and off. Jamelia proceeds to walk on top of the bed in the room as the walls of the room collapse and pyrotechnic lights surround her as the song and video climax.

== Track listings ==
CD single
No.	Title	Length
1.	"No More" (Radio Edit)	3:27
2.	"Beware of the Dog" (Stuart Crichton Mix)	3:04

Digital single
No.	Title	Length
1.	"No More" (Album Version)
2.	"No More" (Radio Edit)
3.	"No More" (Acoustic – Exclusive to iTunes)
4.	"No More" (3am Mix – Exclusive to Vodafone)

== Charts ==
Chart (2007)	Peak position
Czech Republic Airplay (ČNS IFPI)	30
Romania (Romanian Top 100)	39
Scotland Singles (Official Charts)	36
UK Singles (Official Charts)	43
UK Hip Hop/R&B (Official Charts)	8
