= Lost in Space (Apollo 440 song) =

1998 single by Apollo 440

- UK CD2 artwork. CD1 features the same robot against a dark, starry background.

Single by Apollo 440

from the album Lost in Space (Original Motion Picture Soundtrack) and Gettin' High on Your Own Supply
- B-side: "Will & Penny's Theme"; "Alpha Point"
- Released: 27 July 1998
- Genre: Dance
- Length: 3:25
- Label: Stealth Sonic; Epic; TVT Soundtrax
- Songwriter: John Williams
- Producer: @440

Apollo 440 singles chronology
"Rendez-Vous 98" (1998)	"Lost in Space" (1998)	"Stop the Rock" (1999)

Music video
- "Lost in Space" on YouTube

"Lost in Space" is a song by English electronic music group Apollo 440. It served as the theme to the 1998 science-fiction adventure film Lost in Space, which is based on the 1965 television programme of the same name. The original theme, written by John Williams, was remixed by Apollo 440 for the film. Apollo 440 later included the song on their third studio album, Gettin' High on Your Own Supply (1999). Released as a single on 27 July 1998, "Lost in Space" became the group's highest-charting single in their home country, peaking at number four on the UK Singles Chart.

== Release ==
"Lost in Space" was released in the United Kingdom on 27 July 1998 as two CD singles and a cassette single. The first CD contains two B-sides: "Will & Penny's Theme" from the Lost in Space soundtrack and "Alpha Point", a remake of "Omega Point" from Apollo 440's 1995 album Millennium Fever. The second CD contains three remixes and a video edit of "Lost in Space" while the cassette includes the original theme, the Jason Nevins Lunar Landing remix, and a slightly longer version of "Will & Penny's Theme". Six days after its release, the song debuted and peaked at number four on the UK Singles Chart, giving Apollo 440 their highest-charting hit in the UK. It stayed within the top 100 for eight weeks and ended the year at number 103 on the UK year-end chart.

Outside the UK, "Lost in Space" charted in Germany, Ireland, and the Netherlands. In Ireland, the song spent four weeks within the Irish Singles Chart top 30, peaking at number 18. In the Netherlands, the song appeared on the Single Top 100 listing, debuting at number 94 on 15 August 1998 and rising to its peak of number 90 the following week; it dropped out of the top 100 afterwards. On Germany's Media Control chart, "Lost in Space" debuted at number 98 on 28 September 1998. Two weeks later, it rose to its peak of number 74, then spent two more weeks on the chart before dropping out. On the Eurochart Hot 100, the song's UK sales alone allowed it to debut at number 98 on the issue dated 8 August 1998. The following week, with Irish sales included, it jumped to number 27. Finally, with its Dutch sales factored in, it ascended to its peak of number 26. It stayed on the Eurochart Hot 100 for seven weeks in total.

== Track listings ==
UK CD1

1. "Lost in Space (Theme)" – 3:25
2. "Will & Penny's Theme" – 3:21
3. "Alpha Point" – 7:22

UK CD2

1. "Lost in Space" (Jason Nevins Lunar Landing) – 5:40
2. "Lost in Space" (Lionrock Galactic Boogie mix) – 6:00
3. "Lost in Space" (DJ Cam remix) – 4:09
4. "Lost in Space" (Imaginary Forces video edit) – 3:30

UK cassette single

1. "Lost in Space (Theme)" – 3:25
2. "Lost in Space" (Jason Nevins Lunar Landing) – 5:40
3. "Will & Penny's Theme" – 3:40

== Charts ==
=== Weekly charts ===
Chart (1998)	Peak position
Europe (Eurochart Hot 100)	26
Germany (GfK)	74
Ireland (IRMA)	18
Netherlands (Single Top 100)	90
Scotland Singles (Official Charts)	5
UK Singles (Official Charts)	4

=== Year-end charts ===
Chart (1998)	Position
UK Singles (OCC)	103
