= Rich, White, Straight Men =

2019 single by Kesha

Promotional single by Kesha
- Released: June 8, 2019
- Genre: Pop
- Length: 3:13
- Label: RCA; Kemosabe
- Songwriters: Kesha Sebert; Pebe Sebert; Stephen Wrabel; Stuart Crichton
- Producer: Crichton

Music video
- "Rich, White, Straight Men" on YouTube

"Rich, White, Straight Men" is a song by American singer Kesha. It was written by the artist alongside Pebe Sebert, Wrabel, and Stuart Crichton, with production being handled by the latter. The song was surprise released to YouTube on June 2, 2019, and later issued as a standalone single through Kemosabe and RCA Records on June 8.

== Release ==
"Rich, White, Straight Men" was surprise released to YouTube on June 2, 2019, unbeknownst to Kesha's record label RCA Records. Six days later, it impacted online music stores and streaming platforms as a standalone single. The song's artwork consists of a blurry photograph of Kesha giving the middle finger, an action she performs on loop in the accompanying video.

== Composition ==
"Rich, White, Straight Men" is a punk rock influenced pop track with a carnival-esque atmosphere that utilizes alto saxophone, baritone saxophone, flugelhorn, trumpet, trombone, and tuba. It features the "sounds of coins hitting the ground and cashiers opening, a reference to the money-driven political climate." A "power-drunk" male voice accompanies Kesha's singing; it rebutts the lyrics' progressive statements regarding free health care, free education, gender equality, reproductive rights, open borders, and same-sex marriage. Bandwagon's Valerie Yuam wrote that the song "places Kesha’s humorous side in the spotlight while still effectively delivering her core message" and is "a commentary on the current socio-political situation in the United States." "Rich, White, Straight Men" was compared to the works of Danny Elfman and Brendon Urie. The lullaby "Twinkle, Twinkle, Little Star" is invoked in the lyrics "Twinkle, twinkle little star/How I wish the world was different/Where who you love and who you are/Was nobody’s fucking business".

== Critical response ==
Sam Van Pykeren of Mother Jones complimented the song's uniqueness and political tone, writing, "Kesha finally sheds the restraints of her recent work for the direct and literal, returning to what made her a star in the first place: excessiveness packaged in oddity." Frida Garza of feminist website Jezebel also praised the song's lyrical and musical characteristics while affirming that "this song is unlike any other Kesha's ever released; [...] This is far from the perfectly manicured pop songs that were once her calling card." At Paper, Michael Love Michael questioned the song's effectiveness against the political group it addresses, although he connected to its premise, commenting, "Toppling an oppressive and domineering patriarchy starts with that kind of rage. As it should be." Hollywood Life's Brandy Robidoux deemed the track "controversial".

Writing for the conservative website Washington Examiner, Madeline Fry called the song "boring" and criticized Kesha's intention to "blame the ills of society on all white males."

== Credits and personnel ==
Credits organized in alphabetical order by surname and adapted from Tidal.

- Dale Becker – mastering
- Stuart Crichton – songwriting, production, keyboards, mixing, programming
- Matt Dyson – engineering
- Woitek Goral – alto saxophone
- Tomas Jansson – baritone saxophone
- Magnus Johansson – flugelhorn, trumpet
- Peter Johansson – trombone, tuba
- Kesha Sebert – lead vocals, songwriting
- Pebe Sebert – songwriting
- Stephen Wrabel – songwriting, backing vocals
