= Zvi Eliezer Alonie =

Israeli rabbi (born 1951)

Rabbi Zvi Eliezer Alonie
- צבי אליעזר אלוני

Personal life
- Born: 29 June 1951 (age 74) Tel Aviv, Israel

Religious life
- Religion: Judaism
- Denomination: Orthodox Judaism

Jewish leader
- Predecessor: Rabbi Kotel Da-Don
- Successor: Rabbi Luciano Moše Prelević
- Synagogue: Jewish community Zagreb Synagogue
- Position: Rabbi
- Began: 2006
- Ended: 2008
- Residence: Zagreb

Rabbi Zvi Eliezer Alonie (Hebrew: צבי אליעזר אלוני; born 29 June 1951, in Tel Aviv) is an Israeli rabbi who previously served as a rabbi of the Zagreb Jewish community in Croatia.

Alonie was born in Tel Aviv on 29 June 1951. His parents were German-born Holocaust survivors of the Bergen-Belsen concentration camp. Alonie spent his childhood in Pardes Hanna-Karkur and finished high school education in Netanya. He studied veterinary medicine in Berlin, Germany. While in Berlin Alonie graduated from the Beth midrash "Or Zion". Upon his return to Israel he was drafted into the Israel Defense Forces. He completed military service with an Officer rank. In 1988 Alonie moved to Miami, United States where he opened a chain of restaurants and cafes.

After his father's death in 1994 he returned to Germany, where he cultivated a greater interest in his orthodox roots. While in Germany, he started rabbinical studies with the Berlin rabbi Avraham Daus. In 1999/2000 Alonie graduated with a Master of Rabbinic Studies. His degree was confirmed by the Chief Rabbi of Israel Mordechai Eliyahu. Alonie began serving the Mainz Jewish community in 2001.

In 2006 he moved to Zagreb where he was elected rabbi of the Zagreb Jewish community, after he noticed that the contract of the previous rabbi had expired. Alonie replaced the rabbi Kotel Da-Don whose contract was not extended by the presidency of the Zagreb Jewish community. In 2006 Alonie was pushed and verbally attacked by a group of skinheads in downtown Zagreb. Alonie served as rabbi of the Zagreb Jewish community until 2008 when he was replaced by rabbi Luciano Moše Prelević.

Alonie is married and has three daughters.
