= Umboza =

House duo from the United Kingdom

- Origin: United Kingdom
- Genres: House, Eurodance
- Years active: 1995–1996
- Past members: Stuart Crichton; Michael Kilkie

Umboza were a house duo from the United Kingdom composed of Stuart Crichton and Michael Kilkie. They recorded for Positiva Records.

Umboza's 1995 single "Cry India", based on a sample of Lionel Richie's hit "All Night Long", was a hit both in the U.S. and the UK. The song peaked at #16 on the Billboard Dance Club Play chart and #19 on the UK Singles Chart. A second single, "Sunshine", based on a sample of the Gipsy Kings hit "Bamboléo", proved to be their biggest UK hit, reaching #14 in 1996. The track appeared on numerous compilations including Now 34 and Dancemania 3.

== Discography ==
=== Singles ===
Year	Single	Peak chart positions					Album
Year	Single	AUS	FIN	SWE	UK	US Dance	Album
1995	"Cry India"	194	—	—	19	16	Singles only
1996	"Sunshine"	34	17	16	14	—	Singles only
1996	"Paradiso"	—	—	—	—	—	Singles only
"—" denotes releases that did not chart
