= Narcotic Thrust =

- Origin: London, England
- Genres: Electronic; House
- Years active: 1996–present
- Labels: FFRR (2002–2003) free2air Recordings (2004–present)
- Members: Stuart Crichton; Andy Morris

Narcotic Thrust are a Scottish and English electronic dance music duo, consisting of producers Stuart Crichton and Andy Morris. The name Narcotic Thrust is an anagram of "Stuart Crichton".

Their song "Safe from Harm" hit No. 1 on the US Hot Dance Club Play chart in 2002, featuring the lead vocals of Yvonne John Lewis. It was also the first track released on Deep Dish's Yoshitoshi Records to top the US dance chart.

In mid-2004, Narcotic Thrust saw even greater success when their single "I Like It" reached No. 9 on the UK Singles Chart.

The band's third single in 2005, called "When the Dawn Breaks", featured Gary Clark (vocalist from the Scottish band Danny Wilson) on vocals. In 2006, Narcotic Thrust released their fourth single, "Waiting for You" again featuring the vocals of Yvonne John Lewis.

Narcotic Thrust have also made remixes of "The Sound of Violence" by Cassius, "Red Blooded Woman" by Kylie Minogue and "Suffer Well" by Depeche Mode.

== Discography ==
List of singles, with selected chart positions
Title	Year	Peak chart positions	
Title	Year	UK	AUS
"Funky Acid Baby"	1996	96	—
"Safe from Harm" (with Yvonne John Lewis)	2002	24	—
"I Like It" (with Yvonne John Lewis)	2004	9	68
"When the Dawn Breaks" (with Gary Clark)	2005	28	81
"Waiting for You" (with Yvonne John Lewis)	2006	—	—

== Awards and nominations ==
Award	Year	Nominee(s)	Category	Result	Ref.
Billboard Music Awards	2005	Themselves	Top Hot Dance Airplay Artist	Nominated	
DanceStar USA Awards	2003	"Safe from Harm"	Record of the Year	Nominated	
International Dance Music Awards	2003	"Safe from Harm"	Best Underground Dance Track	Nominated	
International Dance Music Awards	2005	"I Like It"	Best Pop Dance Track	Won	

== See also ==
- List of number-one dance hits (United States)
- List of artists who reached number one on the US Dance chart
