= Lost in Space (film) =

1998 science fiction film by Stephen Hopkins

- Theatrical release poster
- Directed by: Stephen Hopkins
- Written by: Akiva Goldsman
- Based on: Lost in Space 1965-68 TV series by Irwin Allen; The Swiss Family Robinson 1812 novel by Johann David Wyss
- Produced by: Mark W. Koch; Stephen Hopkins; Akiva Goldsman; Carla Fry
- Starring: Gary Oldman; William Hurt; Matt LeBlanc; Mimi Rogers; Heather Graham; Lacey Chabert; Jack Johnson; Jared Harris
- Cinematography: Peter Levy
- Edited by: Ray Lovejoy
- Music by: Bruce Broughton
- Production companies: New Line Cinema; Prelude Pictures; Saltire Entertainment
- Distributed by: New Line Cinema
- Release date: April 3, 1998
- Running time: 130 minutes
- Country: United States
- Language: English
- Budget: $80 million
- Box office: $136.1 million

Lost in Space is a 1998 American science fiction action-adventure film directed by Stephen Hopkins, and starring Gary Oldman, William Hurt, Matt LeBlanc, Mimi Rogers, Heather Graham, Lacey Chabert in her first feature film appearance, Jack Johnson, and Jared Harris. The plot is adapted from the 1965–1968 CBS television series of the same name, which was loosely based on the 1812 novel by Johann David Wyss (and similarly named movies), The Swiss Family Robinson. Several actors from the television show make cameo appearances.

The film focuses on the Robinson family, who undertake a voyage to a nearby star system to begin large-scale emigration from a soon-to-be uninhabitable Earth, but are thrown off course by a saboteur and must try to find their way home.

Lost in Space was released by New Line Cinema on April 3, 1998, and received negative reviews from critics, grossing $136.1 million worldwide with an $80 million budget.

== Plot ==
In 2058, Earth will soon be uninhabitable due to the irreversible effects of pollution and ozone depletion. In an effort to save humanity, the United Global Space Force sends Professor John Robinson, his wife Maureen, daughters Judy and Penny, and young prodigy son Will on the spaceship Jupiter II to complete construction of a hypergate over the planet Alpha Prime, which will allow the population of Earth to be instantly transported and populate the new planet. Penny rebels by breaking curfew, while Will's prize-winning science experiment involving time travel goes largely unnoticed by John. Global Sedition, a mutant terrorist group, assassinates the Jupiter II's pilot, who is replaced by hotshot fighter pilot Major Don West, to his chagrin.

The family's physician Dr. Zachary Smith, a Sedition spy, sabotages the ship's on-board robot before launch, but is betrayed by his cohorts and left unconscious as the ship launches and the family enters cryosleep. The robot activates and begins to destroy the navigation and guidance systems, en route to destroying the family. Smith awakens the Robinsons and Don, who subdue the robot, but the ship is falling uncontrollably into the Sun. Forced to use the experimental hyperdrive with an unplotted course, the ship is transported through hyperspace to a remote planet in an uncharted part of the universe.

Passing through a strange distortion in space, the crew finds two abandoned ships in orbit: the Earth ship Proteus, and another ship clearly not of human origin. They board the Proteus, with Will controlling the now-modified robot. They find navigational data to reach Alpha Prime, and a camouflaging creature Penny calls "Blarp", along with evidence suggesting the ship is from the future. They are attacked by spider-like creatures; one scratches Smith, and the robot's body is irreparably damaged but Will saves its computerized intelligence.

Don destroys the vessel to eradicate the spiders, causing the ship to crash-land on the nearby planet, where another distortion appears. Will theorizes they are distortions in time, as his experiment predicted, but John ignores his input. Exploring the time bubble, he and Don encounter a future version of Will and a robot he rebuilt with the saved intelligence. The older Will explains that surviving spiders killed Maureen, Penny, and Judy. Constructing a time machine, the future Will intends to return to Earth to prevent Jupiter II from launching.

Young Will and Smith investigate the time bubble on their own. Smith tricks Will into handing over his weapon, but is foiled by a future version of himself, transformed by his spider injury into a spider-like creature, who has been protecting Will since the rest of the family was killed. The present Will and Don return to the Jupiter II with an injured Smith and the robot in tow, while the future Smith reveals his true plan: He killed the Robinsons, but kept Will alive to build the time machine, so Smith could return to Earth and populate it with a race of spiders.

John, remembering that spiders eat their wounded, rips open Smith's egg sac with a trophy Will turned into a weapon. Smith's spider army devours him and he is thrown into the plasmic ring around the time portal, ripping him apart. The planet's increasing instability forces the Jupiter II to take off, but they are unable to reach escape velocity and are destroyed by the planet's debris. Realizing his father never actually abandoned them, Will sets the time machine to send John back to his family, but there is only enough power for one person. Saying goodbye to his family, the future Will is killed by falling debris, and John reunites with his living family.

Realizing they do not have enough power to escape the planet's gravitational pull, John suggests they drive the ship down through the planet, using the gravity well to slingshot them back into space. They are successful, but the planet turns into a black hole, and they activate the hyperdrive to escape. Using the Proteus’ navigational data to set a potential course for Alpha Prime, the ship blasts off into hyperspace.

== Cast ==
- William Hurt as Professor John Robinson
- Mimi Rogers as Professor Maureen Robinson
- Heather Graham as Doctor Judy Robinson
- Lacey Chabert as Penny Robinson
- Jack Johnson as Will Robinson
- Jared Harris as Older Will Robinson
- Matt LeBlanc as Major Don West
- Gary Oldman as Doctor Zachary Smith
- Dick Tufeld as the voice of Robot
- Lennie James as Jeb Walker
- Mark Goddard as General
- June Lockhart as Principal
- Marta Kristen as Reporter #1
- Angela Cartwright as Reporter #2
- Edward Fox as Businessman
- Gary A. Hecker as voice of Blarp

== Production ==
Filming began on March 3, 1997, in London's Shepperton Studios, with more than 700 visual effects shots planned, done by Computer Film Company, The Mill, Cinesite and Jim Henson's Creature Shop, among other visual effects vendors. The $70 million Lost in Space film was New Line's hope to launch a multimedia franchise, followed by animated and live-action television series. Licensing deals were made with Trendmasters for toys and Harper Prism and Scholastic for tie-in novels. Several of the cast from the original TV series also made cameo appearances.

== Music ==
TVT Records released a soundtrack album on March 31, 1998, featuring 11 tracks of Bruce Broughton's original score and eight tracks of electronic techno music (most of which is heard only over the film's end credits). Broughton's score takes no cues from either of the TV themes composed by John Williams, while the Lost in Space (Apollo 440 song) takes cues from the second version of Williams' TV theme. A European version of the soundtrack album was released that omits the tracks "Spider Attack", "Jupiter Crashes", and "Spider Smith", and instead includes three new songs unused in the film ("Aah-Yah" by O.P. Phoenix, "Asphalt Ostrich" by HeadCrash, and "Anarchy" by KMFDM). Intrada Records released a score album for the film the following year, and the complete score in 2016. The track "Thru the Planet" on the TVT album is not the same as "Through the Planet" on the Intrada release, but is a shortened version of Broughton's unused end-title music heard on the score album as "Lost in Space."

=== TVT Records Soundtrack Album ===
Lost in Space: Original Motion Picture Soundtrack

Soundtrack album by Various
- Released: March 31, 1998
- Genres: Big beat, film score
- Length: 67:59
- Label: TVT Records

Lost in Space: Original Motion Picture Soundtrack
No.	Title	Artist	Length
1.	"Lost in Space – Theme"	Apollo 440	3:27
2.	"I'm Here... Another Planet"	Juno Reactor / The Creatures	4:21
3.	"Busy Child"	The Crystal Method	7:27
4.	"Bang On"	Propellerheads	5:47
5.	"Everybody Needs a 303"	Fatboy Slim	5:49
6.	"Will & Penny's Theme"	Apollo 440	3:22
7.	"Song for Penny"	Death in Vegas	5:35
8.	"Lost in Space"	Space	3:30
9.	"Main Title"	Bruce Broughton	1:03
10.	"Reprogram the Robot"	Bruce Broughton	2:17
11.	"The Launch"	Bruce Broughton	4:14
12.	"The Robot Attack"	Bruce Broughton	2:54
13.	"The Proteus"	Bruce Broughton	2:26
14.	"Spiders Attack"	Bruce Broughton	2:26
15.	"Jupiter Crashes"	Bruce Broughton	1:17
16.	"Spider Smith"	Bruce Broughton	2:42
17.	"Kill the Monster"	Bruce Broughton	3:54
18.	"The Portal"	Bruce Broughton	2:46
19.	"Thru the Planet"	Bruce Broughton	2:42

=== Intrada score album ===
Lost in Space: Original Motion Picture Score

Soundtrack album by Bruce Broughton
- Released: March 23, 1999 (original release); February 29, 2016 (expansion)
- Genre: Film score
- Length: 67:03 (original release); 122:49 (expansion)
- Label: Intrada Records

All music is composed by Bruce Broughton.

Lost in Space: Original Motion Picture Score
No.	Title	Length
1.	"Prologue"	0:57
2.	"Preparing for Space"	2:31
3.	"The Launch"	6:22
4.	"Robot Attack"	3:21
5.	"Into the Sun"	6:21
6.	"Spiders"	10:22
7.	"A New World"	1:25
8.	"Guiding Stars"	1:37
9.	"The Time Bubbles"	2:21
10.	"Smith's Plan"	1:21
11.	"Will and Smith Explore"	2:00
12.	"Will's Time Machine"	4:24
13.	"Spider Smith"	2:39
14.	"Facing the Monster"	8:46
15.	"Attempted Escape"	1:26
16.	"The Time Portal"	2:42
17.	"Through the Planet"	2:31
18.	"Back to Hyperspace"	1:38
19.	"Fanfare for Will"	0:27
20.	"Lost in Space"	3:24

All music is composed by Bruce Broughton.

Lost in Space: 2-Disc Edition - CD 1
No.	Title	Length
1.	"Prologue"	0:58
2.	"Main Title/Major Mayhem"	4:07
3.	"Hologram Gags/You'll Do (Alternate)"	1:05
4.	"Meet Dr. Smith"	1:40
5.	"Dog Tags, No. 1"	0:38
6.	"Reprogram The Robot/The Launch"	6:25
7.	"Bad Dream/The Robot Attack"	3:22
8.	"Where's Judy?/Judy Is Dying (Remix)"	6:23
9.	"Can't Kill The Man (Revised)"	0:49
10.	"We're Lost"	0:23
11.	"The Proteus (Alternate)"	2:23
12.	"Boarding The Proteus, Pt. 1/Boarding The Proteus, Pt. 2"	7:01
13.	"Spiders And Static/Spiders Attack (Revised)"	7:54
14.	"Jupiter Crash"	1:11
15.	"A Strange New Place/Spider Scratch"	1:29
16.	"Matt And Judy"	1:40
17.	"Goodnights"	0:38
18.	"Energy Bubbles/Dog Tags, No. 2/John And West Set Out"	2:23
19.	"Will's Walk/Smith Persuades Will"	1:56
20.	"Will And Smith Set Out"	1:59
21.	"Decades Old/I'm Your Son (Revised)/Time Machine"	4:27

All music is composed by Bruce Broughton.

Lost in Space: 2-Disc Edition - CD 2
No.	Title	Length
1.	"Never Trust Anyone/Smith Interrupts/Spider Smith"	3:01
2.	"Friendship/We Have A Plan/Kill The Monster (Revised)"	8:46
3.	"Let's Go Major (Original)"	1:26
4.	"The Portal (Revised Alternate)"	2:44
5.	"Through The Planet (Revised Alternate)"	2:28
6.	"Nice Work Fly Boy (Revised)"	1:36
7.	"Fanfare For Will"	0:27
8.	"Lost In Space"	3:26
9.	"Hologram Gags/You'll Do (Original)"	1:04
10.	"Can't Kill The Man (Original)"	0:49
11.	"The Proteus (Original)"	2:24
12.	"Spiders And Static/Spiders Attack (Original)"	7:54
13.	"Decades Old/I'm Your Son (Original)/Time Machine"	4:32
14.	"Friendship/We Have A Plan/Kill The Monster (Original)"	8:50
15.	"Let's Go Major (Alternate)"	1:24
16.	"The Portal (Original)"	2:42
17.	"The Portal (Revised)"	2:43
18.	"Through The Planet (Original)"	3:13
19.	"Through The Planet (Revised)"	2:41
20.	"Nice Work Fly Boy (Original)"	1:48

== Release ==
=== Box office ===
On its opening weekend, Lost in Space grossed $20,154,919 and debuted at number one at the US box office, ending Titanic's 15-week-long hold on the first-place position. It opened in a record 3,306 theaters and grossed an average of $6,096 per screening. The film achieved the biggest April opening weekend at the time, replacing Indecent Proposal. This record would be held until 1999 when The Matrix surpassed it. Lost in Space grossed $69.1 million in the United States and Canada, and $67 million internationally, bringing its worldwide total to $136.1 million.

=== Critical response ===
Lost in Space received negative reviews from critics upon release. Roger Ebert gave the film a rating of one and a half out of four, calling it a "dim-witted shoot-'em-up". Wade Major of BoxOffice rated the film at 1 and a half out of 5, calling it "the dumbest and least imaginative adaptation of a television series yet translated to the screen." James Berardinelli was slightly more favorable, giving the film a rating of 2 and a half out of 4. While praising the film's set design, he criticized its "meandering storyline and lifeless protagonists", saying that "Lost in Space features a few action sequences that generate adrenaline jolts, but this is not an edge-of-the-seat motion picture."

Online aggregators have tracked both contemporary and recent reviews of Lost in Space. At Rotten Tomatoes, the film has an approval rating of 27% based on 84 appraisals, with an average score of 4.9/10. The site's consensus reads: "Clumsily directed and missing most of the TV series' campy charm, Lost in Space sadly lives down to its title." The film holds a score of 42 out of 100 on Metacritic, based on the opinions of 19 journalists, indicating "mixed or average" reviews. Audiences polled by CinemaScore gave the film an average grade of "B−" on an A+ to F scale.

=== Accolades ===
Lost in Space received six Saturn Award nominations, including Best Supporting Actor for Oldman. The film also received a Golden Raspberry Award nomination for Worst Remake or Sequel, but lost to the tied Godzilla, The Avengers and Psycho.

At the 1998 Stinkers Bad Movie Awards, the film won Worst Supporting Actress for Chabert and was nominated for four other awards: Worst Song in a Movie for "Lost in Space" (lost to "Come with Me"), Worst Resurrection of a TV Show (lost to The Avengers), Worst Director for Hopkins (lost to Jeremiah Chechik for The Avengers), and Worst Picture (lost to Spice World).

=== Home media ===
VHS, Laserdisc, DVD, and later a Blu-ray have been released for the film. Both the DVD and Blu-ray releases contain deleted scenes.

The film was released on 4K UHD Blu-ray on September 2, 2025, by Arrow Video.
