= Reuven Yaron =

- ראובן ירון
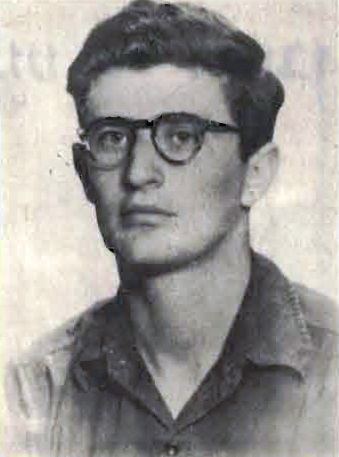
- Born: Ruben Mihael Freiberger; 1932; Zagreb, Kingdom of Yugoslavia, (now Croatia)
- Died: 1956 (aged 24); Near Dahab, Sinai Peninsula, Egypt
- Relatives: Miroslav Šalom Freiberger (father); Irena (née Steiner) Freiberger (mother)

Reuven Yaron (Hebrew: ראובן ירון, born Ruben Mihael Freiberger; 1932 – 1956) was an Israeli soldier, composer and son of Miroslav Šalom Freiberger, the chief rabbi of Zagreb and Croatia.

== Early life ==
Yaron was born in Zagreb and was the only child of Rabbi Miroslav Šalom and Irena (née Steiner) Freiberger. During World War II, at the end of 1942, Yaron's father had escorted the last group of rescued Jews from Zagreb to Budapest and Istanbul, from where they were transferred to Mandatory Palestine. Among the ten underage girls and boys was Yaron. The group had received travel documents only after Archbishop of Zagreb Aloysius Stepinac and Vatican officials had intervened with the Independent State of Croatia authorities.

== Life in Israel ==
In 1943, following 16 days of travel, Yaron arrived in Palestine. Upon his arrival, he Hebraized his name and surname. His father, mother, grandfather Antun, grandmother Anka and aunt Ljubica would all be killed in the Holocaust. He was adopted by Avraam and Lina Avni and accepted into the Sha'ar HaAmakim Kibbutz. His music talent soon became evident, inherited from his mother, who played piano, and uncle, who was a singer at the Croatian National Theatre in Zagreb. Yaron took lessons at the Tel Aviv Conservatorium. There he studied under the mentorship of one of the most prominent Israeli composers, Mordechai Seter. At the age of 15 he conducted a choir. In March 1956, the "Rinat Choir," which he conducted, won first prize at an international festival in Paris, a competition in which 16 countries participated. The choir sang Yaron's song.

In 1956, he was killed while fighting as a soldier in the Suez War. He was buried in the cemetery on Sha'ar HaAmakim.
