= Amiel Shomrony =

Yugoslav-born noted Holocaust Survivor (1917–2009

- Born: Emil Schwartz; 16 August 1917; Županja, Austro-Hungarian monarchy, (now Croatia)
- Died: September 2009 (aged 92); Israel
- Occupation: Hazzan

Amiel Shomrony (born Emil Schwartz; Hebrew: עמיאל שומרוני; 1917 – 2009) was a Yugoslav-born Israeli Holocaust survivor, who served as secretary of Zagreb's chief rabbi Miroslav Šalom Freiberger during World War II.

Shomrony was born in 1917, the son of physician Milan Schwartz. He had an older sister, Hedva. When he was 13, his mother, Lora, died of cancer. Prior to World War II, he had studied to be a veterinarian. In 1941, after the German invasion of Yugoslavia, Shomrony and his family were protected by Dido Kvaternik, who had been his father's patient.

After the establishment of the Independent State of Croatia and the enactment of race laws, he was forced to stop his studies. He was employed at the Jewish municipality in Zagreb as the secretary of the chief rabbi Miroslav Šalom Freiberger. In mid-1943, Shomrony escaped Zagreb, shortly before the city's remaining Jews were taken to Auschwitz. The route took Shomrony, his wife, daughter, and father from Zagreb to Budapest, through Romania and Bulgaria to Istanbul, and in 1944 they arrived in Palestine.

Shomrony twice nominated the war-time archbishop of Zagreb Aloysius Stepinac to be listed among the Righteous Among the Nations: in 1970 and in 1994. He returned to Croatia in 1996 to participate in a conference on Stepinac. As part of the visit he appeared in the documentary film Svjedok istine.

Amiel Shomrony died in Israel in 2009, aged 92.
