= Melita Lorković =

Croatian musician

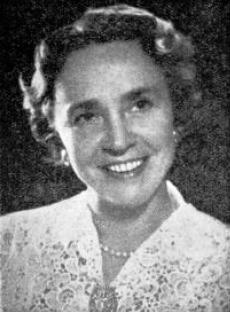
Melita Lorković

Melita Lorković (25 November 1907 – 1 November 1987), was a Croatian female pianist and music pedagogue.

== Family ==
She was born 1907 in Županja. Her brother, Mladen Pozajić was also a pianist, composer, music pedagogue, conductor (of choir and orchestra) and publicist. Melita was educated as a pianist at the Zagreb Music Academy, mainly by Svetislav Stančić, and later in courses with Alfred Cortot, Lazare Lévy, Yvonne Lefebure, Wanda Landowska in Paris and Eduard Steuermann in Salzburg.

She was introduced to her future husband Radoslav Lorković, a chemical engineer, by her friend Vlasta Lorković, a fellow pianist who was later also a professor at the Music Academy of Sarajevo and a concert pianist. Radoslav was killed by the communists in 1945 in Zagreb, and Melita was forced to stop her concert activity from 1943-48 by the Ustaša as well as the SFRJ regime, but she later launched a second career performing the great Piano concerti across Europe, including all five by Beethoven, Chopin, Schumann, both Brahms, Liszt, Rachmanjinow, and modern Croatian composers. Until the end of her life she extended her wide repertory ranging from early Barock to Berg and Rolf Liebermann. Melita had two sons: Hrvoje, (1930-2018) who was a physiologist and professor in Tübingen, London, Minneapolis and Ulm, and Radovan (b. 1932), a concert violinist, educated by Vaclav Huml in Zagreb and later by Max Rostal in London and Bern, whose assistant he was in 1960-65. He published a monography of his mother in Zagreb in 2007.

== Work ==
After her concert tours in Scandinavia, Germany, Austria, Italy, as well as out of Europe, she was compared with the greatest pianists of that time, including Emil von Sauer, Myra Hess, Teresa Carreño and Dinu Lipatti. She was a university professor at the Music Academy in Zagreb (1929-1945), at the Music Academy in Belgrade (1948-1960), and in Cairo (1960-1972). Her students were Milko Kelemen and Milan Horvat. She was appreciated for her interpretations of Beethoven's sonatas, Schumann's Carnival and Kreislariane, Brahms, Chopin's miniatures, Listz's Sonata in h-minor, Tschaikovsky, Debussy, Rahmaninov and Bartok as well as sonatas of Boris Papandopulo, Kunc's Nokturno, Moussorgsky's Images, Dora Pejačević's opus et al.
