= Jakov Bienenfeld =

Croatian businessman

- Born: 28 July 1948; Zagreb, SR Croatia, Yugoslavia
- Died: 8 February 2016 (aged 67); Zagreb, Croatia
- Occupation: Businessman

Jakov Bienenfeld (28 July 1948 – 8 February 2016) was a Croatian entrepreneur and developer.

== Life and career ==
Bienenfeld was born in Zagreb on 28 July 1948 to a Jewish family. Most of his family perished during the Holocaust.

His father, Zlatko Bienenfeld, was Major general of the Croatian Army and personal adviser to late Croatian defence minister Gojko Šušak.

He was a prominent entrepreneur who owned several successful businesses, including a travel agency and a developing company. In the 1990s Bienenfeld brought an exclusive German fashion brand Escada to Croatia. Bienenfeld was also a council member of the Zagreb Jewish community.

During the Croatian War of Independence, in 1991, he co-organized aid convoy on ferryboat "Ilirija" to bring the humanitarian aid to besieged Dubrovnik. With the help and cooperation from Slobodan Praljak, Bienenfeld also co-organized rescue of more than 1,200 Jews from Sarajevo during the Bosnian War. He testified in Praljak's favor during his trial at the International Criminal Tribunal for the former Yugoslavia.

During the last visit of President of Croatia Ivo Josipović to Israel, when in February 2012 he addressed the Knesset apologising for the crimes committed against the Jews on Croatia's soil during World War II, Bienenfeld stated; "I think it is harmful to think that Croats need to redeem themselves for anything. Let's simplify the story, in the history one part of the Croats harmed my people and that is it. Done. Amen. Croats have nothing to redeem themselves for." Bienenfeld believed that Croats, as a nation, are not Antisemits. He stated that he does not have antisemitic experiences in Croatia and that he is proud of the treatment Jews have in Croatia.

Bienenfeld was an acquaintance of Ante Gotovina and has publicly supported him, stating that Gotovina is not guilty of the crimes he had been sentenced for. He resented former President of Croatia Stjepan Mesić's interference in the split of the Zagreb Jewish Community, when Mesić supported Ivo Goldstein, Slavko Goldstein and rabbi Kotel Da-Don in establishing the new Jewish community, Bet Israel. Bienenfeld stated that Mesić accused him of behaving like a Nazi, although Bienenfeld is a Jew whose many family members have been killed during the Holocaust.

In 2013, during an interview for Jutarnji list, Bienenfeld said that he is against the reconstruction of the Zagreb Synagogue, primarily because of the future maintenance costs which Zagreb's Jewish community could not finance. In the interview he also noted that in 1994, when the first President of Croatia Franjo Tuđman told him that they should build the new synagogue which would be funded by the state government, Bienenfeld declined the offer, believing it to be inappropriate when 1800 Catholic churches were left destroyed at the time, during the Croatian War of Independence.

== Bibliography ==
- Snješka Knežević, Aleksander Laslo (2011). Židovski Zagreb. Zagreb: AGM, Židovska općina Zagreb. ISBN 978-953-174-393-8.
