= Stop the Rock =

1999 single by Apollo 440

Single by Apollo 440

from the album Gettin' High on Your Own Supply
- Released: 16 August 1999
- Genre: Big beat
- Length: 3:34
- Label: Stealth Sonic, Epic
- Songwriters: Trevor Gray, Howard Gray, Ian Hoxley, Noko
- Producer: Apollo 440

Apollo 440 singles chronology
"Lost in Space" (1998)	"Stop the Rock" (1999)	"Heart Go Boom" (1999)

"Stop the Rock" is a song by British electronic music group Apollo 440 from their third studio album, Gettin' High on Your Own Supply (1999).

== Composition and recording ==
The song was inspired by Status Quo's "Caroline". The lead vocal was performed by Ian Hoxley, formerly of Gaye Bykers on Acid. Trevor Gray, Howard Gray, Ian Hoxley and Noko are credited as composers.

== Release ==
The single was released on 16 August 1999 through Stealth Sonic and distributed by Sony Music. It spent six weeks on the UK singles chart, peaking at No. 10. In the United States, it was the group's breakout single.

== Music video ==
=== Synopsis ===
The video shows a group of four agents in a car who chase after a dog after its owner lets it go on the loose throughout Los Angeles. The owner is tasered and after going all over the city, eventually the dog shows up to an Apollo 440 studio session where the lead singer Hoxley looks the dog in the eye and growls, scaring it away. It then goes back to the owner.

== Charts ==
=== Weekly charts ===
Chart (1999–2000)	Peak position
Australia (ARIA)	79
Belgium (Ultratip Bubbling Under Flanders)	8
Europe (Eurochart Hot 100)	33
Germany (GfK)	47
Ireland (IRMA)	26
Scottish Singles Sales (Official Charts)	9
Spain (Promusicae)	17
UK Singles (Official Charts)	10
US Dance Club Play (Billboard)	11
US Modern Rock Tracks (Billboard)	21

=== Year-end charts ===
Chart (1999)	Position
UK Singles (OCC)	197

== Release history ==
Region	Date	Format(s)	Label(s)	Ref(s).
United Kingdom	16 August 1999	CD; cassette	Stealth Sonic; Epic	
Japan	25 August 1999	CD	Stealth Sonic; Epic	
United States	4 January 2000	Alternative radio	550 Music	
