= Louis-Félix Amiel =

French painter

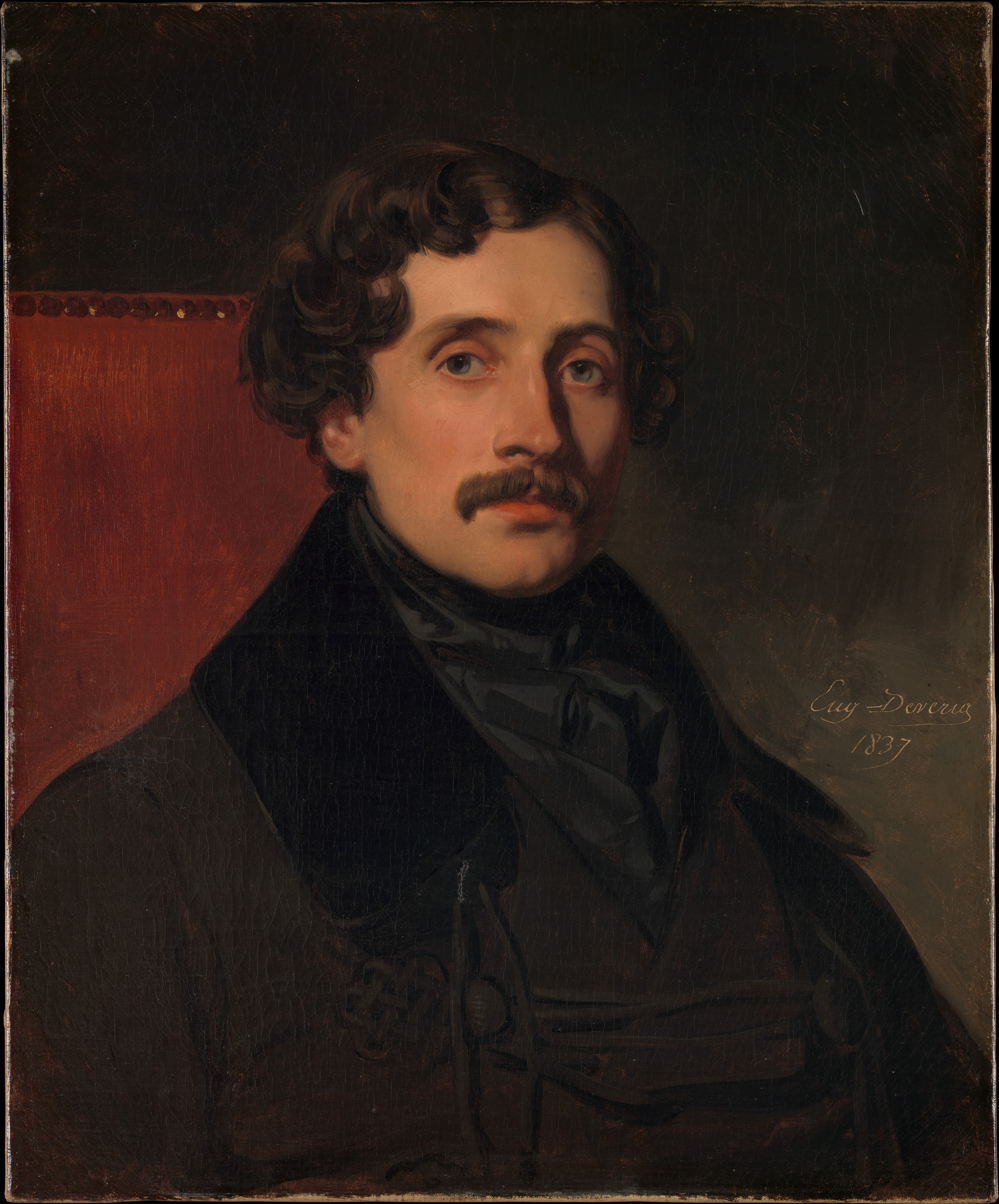
- Portrait of Louis-Félix Amiel by Eugène Devéria (1837)
- Born: March 3 1802; Castelnaudary
- Died: February 4 1864; Joinville-le-Pont
- Education: Beaux-Arts de Paris
- Known for: "Portraits of Kings of France"
- Spouse: Jeanne Crusol
- Father: Jean-Baptiste Amiel

Louis Félix Amiel (1802-1864) was a French portrait painter. He was born at Castelnaudary (Aude). He was a pupil of Baron Gros from 1823 to 1825. He would study at the Beaux-Arts de Paris and specialized in portraiture. He participated in the Salon from 1833 until 1849.

He is most famous for being a major contributor to the series "Portraits of Kings of France", commissioned by King Louis Philippe I from 1837 to 1838.

He died at Joinville-le-Pont in 1864.

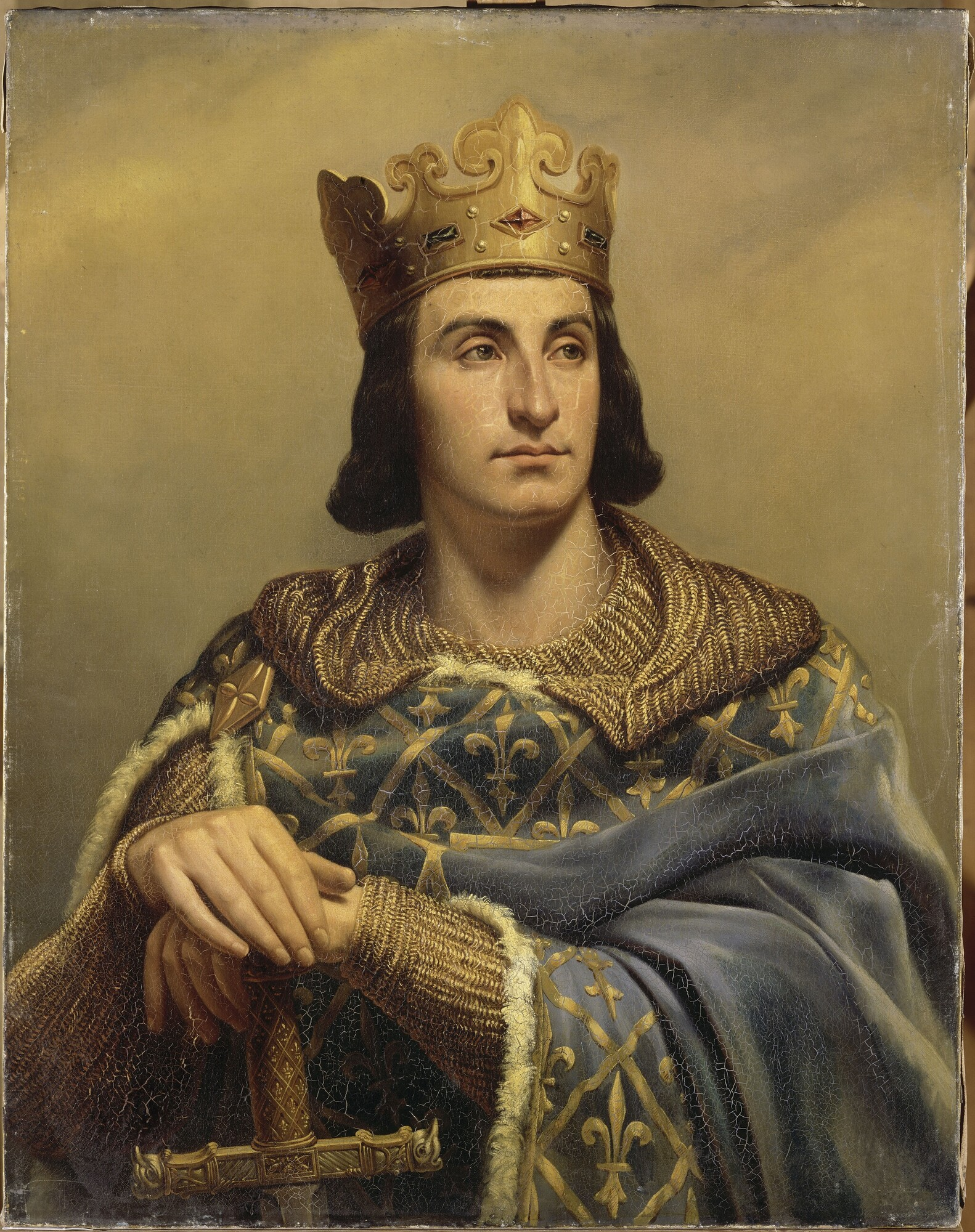
Portrait of Philip II of France, now at the Palace of Versailles.
