= Hrvoje Lorković =

Croatian physiologist and writer

Hrvoje Lorković (12 November 1930 – 11 May 2018) was a Croatian physiologist and writer.

He was a prominent physiologist and writer. He was born in Zagreb on November 12, 1930. He completed his biology studies in Belgrade in 1953, and his doctorate in physiology in Zagreb in 1961. In 1962, he moved to Tübingen, then London, Minneapolis, and Iowa City where he engaged in scientific and pedagogical work. From 1978 until his retirement in 1995, he was a university professor in Ulm. He has written more than fifty scientific papers in the field of muscular physiology, and was a co-editor of a physiology textbook for physicians. Most of the scientific papers were published in English. He was elected a corresponding member of the Croatian Academy of Sciences and Arts in the Department of Natural Sciences in 2002.

== Awards ==
- In 1985, he received the Merkle Prize for his research work
