= Gettin' High on Your Own Supply =

Studio album by Apollo 440
- Released: 6 September 1999
- Studio: Apollo Control, Camden, London
- Genre: Big beat; electronic rock; drum and bass; techno
- Length: 56:23
- Label: Stealth Sonic; Epic; 550
- Producer: Apollo 440

Apollo 440 chronology
Electro Glide in Blue (1997)	Gettin' High on Your Own Supply (1999)	Dude Descending a Staircase (2003)

Singles from Gettin' High on Your Own Supply
- 1. "Lost in Space (Theme)" Released: 27 July 1998; 2. "Stop the Rock" Released: 16 August 1999; 3. "Heart Go Boom" Released: 15 November 1999

Professional ratings
Review scores
Source	Rating
Allmusic	4/5 stars

Gettin' High on Your Own Supply is the third studio album by English electronic music group Apollo 440. It was released on 6 September 1999 in the United Kingdom by Stealth Sonic Recordings and Epic Records, and in the United States by 550 Music.

== Track listing ==
No.	Title	Writer(s)	Length
1.	"Are We a Rock Band or What...?"	Noko; Howard Gray; Trevor Gray	1:19
2.	"Stop the Rock"	Noko; Gray; Gray; Ian Hoxley	3:34
3.	"Crazee Horse"	Noko; Gray; Gray; Hoxley; Paul Colbourne	3:47
4.	"Cold Rock the Mic"	Noko; Gray; Gray; Hoxley	4:19
5.	"Lost in Space (Theme)"	John Williams	3:24
6.	"For Forty Days"	Noko; Gray; Gray	5:32
7.	"Heart Go Boom"	Noko; Gray; Gray; Hoxley; Colbourne; Kevin Goodman	5:01
8.	"The Machine in the Ghost"	Noko; Gray; Gray; Hoxley; Colbourne	6:44
9.	"Blackbeat"	Noko; Gray; Gray; Hoxley	3:24
10.	"Stadium Parking Lot"	Noko; Gray; Gray; Hoxley; Colbourne	3:51
11.	"Yo! Future"	Noko; Gray; Gray; Hoxley; Paul Kodish	4:07
12.	"High on Your Own Supply"	Noko; Gray; Gray; Hoxley; James Gardner	5:22
13.	"The Perfect Crime"	Noko; Gray; Gray	6:02
Total length:			56:29

== Video games ==
- "Stop the Rock" is part of the FIFA 2000, Gran Turismo 3 A-Spec, and Cars Mater-National Championship video game soundtracks.
- "Cold Rock the Mic" was used as part of the Gran Turismo 2 soundtrack.
- "Yo! Future" is used on the soundtrack for ATV Offroad Fury.
- "Blackbeat" is used in the main intro and soundtrack for F1 2002. An edited version was also used for the intro of ITV's Formula 1 coverage from 2000 to 2002.
