= Kotel Da-Don =

Croatian rabbi

Rabbi Kotel Dadon

Personal life
- Born: 12 December 1967 (age 58) Jerusalem, Israel
- Spouse: Agnes Eva Dadon
- Children: 4
- Education: Bar-Ilan University

Religious life
- Religion: Judaism
- Denomination: Orthodox Judaism

Jewish leader
- Predecessor: Rabbi Miroslav Šalom Freiberger
- Synagogue: Bet Israel Synagogue
- Organisation: Zagreb Faculty of Humanities and Social Sciences, Croatian Military Academy
- Began: 2006
- Other: Rabbi of the Jewish community Zagreb Synagogue and Chief Rabbi of Croatia (from 1998 to 2006)
- Residence: Zagreb, Croatia

Kotel Dadon (Hebrew: כותל דדון; born December 12, 1967) is a Croatian rabbi of the Bet Israel community in Zagreb. Da-Don, who was born and educated in Israel, settled in Zagreb in 1998. He was the chief rabbi of Croatia from 1998 to 2006.

== Early life and education ==
Dadon was born in Jerusalem, to Moroccan Jewish parents. He finished his religious education at the Yeshivat HaKotel in Jerusalem, where he studied from 1987 until 1991. From 1991 until 1995, Dadon studied and finished rabbinic education at the rabbinical academy of Midrash Sephardi in Jerusalem, where he received his diploma in pedagogy.

Dadon graduated from the Bar-Ilan University in Ramat Gan, where he studied from 1991 until 1995. He joined the Israel Bar Association in 1995.

== Work in Croatia ==
Dadon first visited Croatia in 1993, when he was sent to Zagreb by his university rabbi, with the duty of leading religious services for the Jewish community in Zagreb. He visited Zagreb again, in 1994. In 1995 he was invited to Zagreb as a rabbi of the Jewish community.

After finishing his studies, Dadon moved to Zagreb in 1998. In the same year he was named the chief rabbi of Croatia. This position had been vacant for more than fifty years, as there were no rabbis in Croatia since Dadon's predecessor Miroslav Šalom Freiberger died as a victim of the Holocaust in 1943.

Dadon held that position until 2006, when the council of the Jewish Community in Zagreb refused to extend his contract, and instead appointed new rabbi Zvi Eliezer Alonie. After that, there was a schism within the community. Da-Don filed a lawsuit at the municipal court in Zagreb, where he sought his return to the position of chief rabbi, with the salary of 15,000 HRK. The group supported by Da-Don: Ivo Goldstein and Slavko Goldstein, split from the Jewish Community of Zagreb led by Ognjen Kraus and Jakov Bienenfeld, and established a new Jewish community, Bet Israel, also based in Zagreb. Bet Israel was officially recognized on 21 July 2006 by the European rabbinical conference, and that same year Ivo Goldstein was elected as their first president. The Jewish Community of Zagreb appointed Zvi Eliezer Alonie as their new rabbi. Relations between the two Jewish communities in Zagreb have remained strained, primarily due to unresolved property issues.

Dadon worked as a professor of rabbinic studies at the Budapest University of Jewish Studies in Budapest. In 2006 Da-Don completed his doctoral studies on Jewish theology. Since 2006, Dadon teaches at the Faculty of Philosophy in Zagreb. He also teaches at the Croatian Military Academy.

== Personal life ==
Dadon married Agnes Eva Dadon in 1995, who is of Hungarian-Jewish descent. Together they have four children, Emanuel-Israel, Aviad-David, Jonathan-Moshe and Simcha-Zsuzsi. In 2009 his eldest son, Emanuel-Israel, celebrated his Bar Mitzvah at the Bet Israel in Zagreb, second Bar Mitzvah celebrated in Croatia since the Holocaust. Dadon is a Croatian citizen and is fluent in Croatian. Dadon is the author of “Judaism: Way of Life, Philosophy and Theology.”
