= Irit Amiel =

Israeli poet (1931–2021)

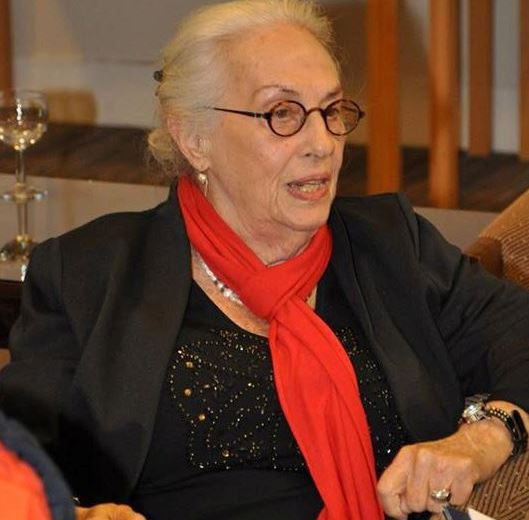
Irit Amiel, 2013

Irit Amiel (Hebrew: אירית עמיאל; 5 May 1931 – 16 February 2021) was a Polish-born Israeli poet, writer and translator.

== Biography ==
She was born in Częstochowa into an assimilated, Polonized Jewish family[2], as the daughter of Leon Librowicz and Jentla née Hasenfeld. Her maternal ancestors arrived in Poland about 400 years ago from German territories, while her paternal ancestors came earlier, probably from Portugal.

During World War II, she stayed in the Częstochowa ghetto, from which she managed to escape, and thanks to Aryan documents and the help of Poles, she survived until the end of the war. Her parents and closest family members were killed in the Treblinka extermination camp. After World War II, at the urging of Icchak Cukierman, she joined the Bricha organization and in 1947 illegally moved to the British Mandate of Palestine with a group of young people.

She initially lived in a kibbutz and later in Tel Aviv. She had six grandchildren.She was buried at the Kiryat Shaul Cemetery[3]. Irena Librowicz (later Irit Amiel) was born in Częstochowa.

Amiel was twice nominated for the Nike Literary Award.
