= Isabelle Pasquet =

French politician (born 1962)

Isabelle Pasquet (born March 8, 1962) is a former member of the Senate of France, representing the Bouches-du-Rhône department from 2008 to 2014. She is a member of the Communist, Republican, and Citizen Group.
