= Yvonne John Lewis =

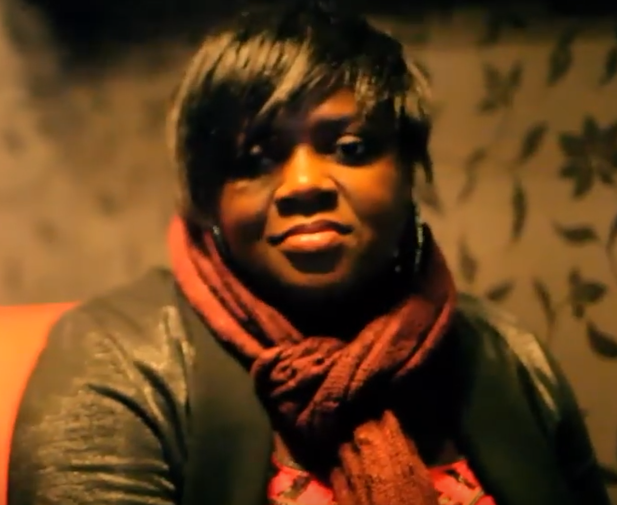
- Yvonne John Lewis

Background information
- Born
- Origin: London
- Years active: 1989–2008

Yvonne John Lewis (Note: Also spelled as Yvonne John-Lewis.) is a British female lead and backing singer.

== Life and career ==
Hailing from London, she was discovered by Osmond Wright, better known by his stage name "Mozez" and a singer for British downtempo group Zero 7.

John Lewis first featured as a lead vocalist on Zero 7's albums, and has gone on to provide lead vocals for and been featured on recordings by artists including as Basement Jaxx, Sia, Stella Browne, Narcotic Thrust and Rollercone. She is well known as the featured singer on Narcotic Thrust's number one Billboard Hot Dance Music/Club Play hit from 2002, Safe from Harm.

John Lewis has worked as a backing vocalist for artists like Bryan Ferry, Blue, Enrique Iglesias, James Fargas, Westlife and Atomic Kitten. She also provided the vocal sample in Simon Webbe's track, "No Worries". She toured with Roxy Music in 2004.

She continued working as a vocalist until 2008.

== See also ==
- List of number-one dance hits (United States)
- List of artists who reached number one on the US Dance chart
