= Miroslav Šalom Freiberger =

Croatian rabbi

Rabbi Miroslav Šalom Freiberger

Personal life
- Born: 9 January 1903 Zagreb, Croatia-Slavonia, Austria-Hungary
- Died: 8 May 1943 (aged 40) Auschwitz-Birkenau, German-occupied Poland
- Spouse: Irena (née Steiner) Freiberger
- Children: Reuven Yaron

Religious life
- Religion: Judaism
- Denomination: Orthodox Judaism

Jewish leader
- Predecessor: Rabbi Mojsije Margel
- Successor: Rabbi Kotel Da-Don
- Synagogue: Zagreb Synagogue
- Position: Rabbi
- Began: 1937
- Ended: 1943
- Other: Chief Rabbi (from 1941 to 1943)
- Residence: Zagreb

Miroslav Šalom Freiberger (Hebrew: שלום פרייברגר; 9 January 1903 – 8 May 1943) was a Croatian chief rabbi, translator, writer and spiritual leader. He was educated as a lawyer and doctor of theology.

== Biography ==
Freiberger was born in Zagreb on 9 January 1903. He was married to Irena (née Steiner) Freiberger with whom he had a son Ruben. Freiberger's first employment in the Jewish community was as a rabbi in Osijek, Slavonia. He served as rabbi of the Jewish community of Zagreb from 1937 to 1941. Freiberger became popular among the young Jews, thanks to his communicativeness. In 1941, after the death of rabbi Gavro Schwarz, he became the chief rabbi of Zagreb. In the years prior to World War II, he was a strong advocate of Zionism and the return of Jews to what was then the British Mandate for Palestine. However, he decided to stay in Zagreb while there was still even one Jew left there.

With the foundation of the Independent State of Croatia and the first application of racial laws, Freiberger made efforts to rescue Jews. He had many connections with Jewish organizations in Italy, Hungary and Switzerland, and extremely good relations with the Catholic Church in Croatia, especially with Alojzije Stepinac, Archbishop of Zagreb. Archbishop Stepinac urged Freiberger and his family to take refuge at his court until the end of the war. However, Freiberger declined the offer since he wanted to share the destiny of his people. At the end of 1942 he escorted the last group of rescued Jews to Budapest and Istanbul, from where they were transferred to the British Mandate for Palestine. Among them, with ten underage girls and boys, was his sixteen-year-old son Ruben. The group had received travel documents only after Stepinac and Vatican officials had intervened with the Croatian authorities.

Despite the efforts of Archbishop Stepinac to save him, in the spring of 1943 Freiberger was arrested by the Independent State of Croatia regime, when Heinrich Himmler himself arrived in Zagreb, dissatisfied with the way the regime was "solving the Jewish question" in Croatia. Archbishop Stepinac immediately sent a request for Freiberger's liberation to state officials, but without success. On 3 May 1943, with the last transport of Jews from Croatia, the Nazis transported Freiberger and his wife from Zagreb Main Station to Auschwitz. He was killed at the camp entrance when he protested against the inhumane procedures inflicted on the members of his community.

Amiel Shomrony, Freiberger's former secretary, filed two motions to recognize Stepinac as righteous among the nations for helping Freiberger in saving the Jewish people of his community.

== Works ==
Even as a rabbi in Osijek, Freiberger was a noted writer, dealing especially with issues of the organization and operation of the Jewish community in the European diaspora during the middle and modern ages. His articles were published in the Jewish community magazine Jew. Since he always considered himself both a Jew and a Croat, he expressed his dual background with alternative versions of his name. His works in the field of spirituality, originally intended for the Jewish community, he signed as "Shalom M. Freiberger", while those of a wider public and secular interest he signed as "Miroslav Š. Freiberger". Among other things, Freiberger translated a prayer from Hebrew, which was released by the Jewish National Library in Zagreb in 1938 and reprinted by the Jewish Community of Zagreb in 1998.

== Bibliography ==
- Snješka Knežević, Aleksander Laslo (2011). Židovski Zagreb. Zagreb: AGM, Židovska općina Zagreb. ISBN 978-953-174-393-8.
- Goldstein, Ivo (2001). Holokaust u Zagrebu. Zagreb: Novi Liber. ISBN 953-6045-19-2.
- Goldstein, Ivo (2005). Židovi u Zagrebu 1918 - 1941. Zagreb: Novi Liber. ISBN 953-6045-23-0.
