= Morata =

Morata may refer to:

== People ==
- Álvaro Morata (born 1992), Spanish footballer
- Christian Joseph Morata Bautista (born 1981), Filipino singer, actor, host, and model
- Olympia Fulvia Morata (1526–1555), Italian classical scholar
- Ursula Micaela Morata (1628–1703), nun, mystic, and founder of the convent of the Capuchin Poor Clares in Alicante, Spain

== Places ==
- Morata, Papua New Guinea, suburb of Port Moresby, the capital city of Papua New Guinea
- Morata de Jalón, municipality located in the province of Zaragoza, Aragon, Spain
- Morata de Jiloca, municipality located in the province of Zaragoza, Aragon, Spain
- Morata de Tajuña, municipality located in the province of Madrid, Spain

== See also ==
- 14643 Morata, a main-belt asteroid
- Morada (disambiguation)
- Moratia
- Moretta
- Morita (disambiguation)
- Murata (disambiguation)
