= Mary Byker =

- Also known as: Mary Mary
- Born: Ian Garfield Hoxley
- Genres: Rock
- Occupation: Singer
- Instrument: Vocals
- Years active: 1986–present

Ian Garfield Hoxley, known by his stage name Mary Byker (a.k.a. Mary Mary) is an English singer, record producer and DJ known for his work as the lead singer of Gaye Bykers on Acid, Pop Will Eat Itself, Pigface and Apollo 440.

== Biography ==
=== Early life ===
Byker was a founding member of grebo band Gaye Bykers on Acid, which he formed with bassist Robber Byker in 1985 before being joined by guitarist Tony Byker and drummer Kevin Hyde in 1986. The band recorded several albums before dissolving in 1990. Following this, he worked with Martin Atkins in the Industrial Music supergroup Pigface as well as Hyperhead before joining Apollo 440 in 1996. In 2002 he toured with former bandmate Noko as part of Maximum Roach. In 2010 he joined the recently reformed Pop Will Eat Itself as co-vocalist alongside Graham Crabb. When not touring and recording with Pop Will Eat Itself, Byker works as a DJ while occasionally scoring music for films and television.

== Musical career ==
=== Gaye Bykers on Acid ===
Mary formed Gaye Bykers on Acid with bassist Robber Byker in 1985 and were eventually joined by drummer Kevin Hyde and guitarist Tony Byker. They released two singles, Everythang's Groovy and Nosedive Karma on In-Tape before Virgin Records signed the band to a 10-album contract for £100,000 a year. In 1987 they released their debut LP Drill Your Own Hole which was followed by Stewed To The Gills... in 1989. Lack of promotion led to poor sales the band were dropped by Virgin. In 1990 the band, disguised as a fictitious East German punk band named Rektüm, released the thrash album Sakredanus and the EP Real Horrowshow. After parting with Virgin Records they released a further two albums in 1990 on their own label Naked Brain (Cancer Planet Mission and Pernicious Nonsense) before the group dissolved in late 1990.

=== Pigface ===
After Gaye Bykers on Acid split in 1990, Byker went to see Henry Rollins live with Paul Raven. Raven gave him £200 and asked him to fly to Chicago to join industrial supergroup Pigface. Byker ended up spending the money, but during a Killing Joke show Martin Atkins persuaded him to fly to Chicago and join the band. Byker joined the band on their second tour and toured the US and Europe with Pigface. He featured as vocalist on the albums Fook, Washingmachine Mouth and 6

=== Hyperhead ===
In 1992 Byker formed Hyperhead along with Martin Atkins, Karl Leiker, William Tucker (previously of Revolting Cocks and My Life with the Thrill Kill Kult) and Paul Dalloway. After demoing tracks, the band recorded the album at Pachyderm Studios in Cannon Falls before returning to London to mix the LP with Noko. The resulting album, Metaphasia, was released in 1992 on Devotion Records. A touring line-up of Mary, Leiker and Dalloway, with Oscar (guitar), Chin (drums), and Keith (percussion) built up a reputation for their live performances. Two EPs followed but the band split up without releasing another album.

=== Apollo 440 ===
In 1997 Byker joined Apollo 440. His first contribution was to provide vocals for the song Ain't Talkin' 'bout Dub which peaked at number 7 in the UK Singles Chart. Following this, he and the band recorded their second album Electro Glide in Blue. Byker, Trevor Gray and Howard Gray wrote and produced Liverpool FC's FA Cup Final single Pass & Move (It's the Liverpool Groove) under the name Boot Room Boyz. It reached number 4 in the UK Singles Chart. In 1999 the band released Gettin' High on Your Own Supply. The album proved to be hit and went to number 20 in the UK Album Chart. The album spawned two UK Top 10 singles including the theme to the 1998 movie Lost in Space and Stop the Rock. In 1999 Byker appeared on Never Mind The Buzzcocks and featured as a player on FIFA 2000 with other Apollo 440 members Noko, Trevor Gray and Howard Gray.

In 1998 Byker teamed up with Hoodlum Priest and contributed vocals to three tracks on his self-titled second album.

In 2002 Byker toured with the band Maximum Roach. They recorded an album's worth of material but broke up after a deal with Trent Reznor's label Nothing Records fell through.

=== Pop Will Eat Itself ===
Byker is currently the co-vocalist of the band Pop Will Eat Itself along with Graham Crabb. He has featured on the LPs New Noise Designed by a Sadist and Anti-Nasty League.

=== Am I Dead Yet? ===
In October 2018, Mary teamed up with long time collaborator Noko 440 to form Am I Dead Yet?. Their self-titled debut album was successfully crowd funded in March 2018 and released on Wire-Sound on 27 April 2019.

== Personal life ==
In 1987, Byker married girlfriend and The Bomb Party bassist Sarah Corina. Following a divorce in the early 1990s, he married Brazilian Ana Vance. Byker moved to Brazil in 2007 with his wife and opened an East-Asian-themed restaurant called Mekong in Rio de Janeiro.

== Selected discography ==
=== Gaye Bykers on Acid ===
==== Albums ====
- Drill Your Own Hole (1987)
- Stewed To The Gills (1989)
- Sakredanus (1989) (as Rektüm)
- Cancer Planet Mission (1990)
- Pernicious Nonsense (1990)

=== Pigface ===
==== Albums ====
- Fook (1992)
- 6 (2009)

==== EP ====
- Washingmachine Mouth EP (1993)

=== Hyperhead ===
==== Albums ====
- Metaphasia (1992)

==== EP/Singles ====
- Teenage Mind (1992),
- Terminal Fear (1993)

=== Liverpool F.C. & The Boot Room Boyz ===
==== Single ====
- Pass & Move (It's the Liverpool Groove) (1996)

=== Apollo 440 ===
==== Albums ====
- Electro Glide in Blue (1997)
- Gettin' High on Your Own Supply (1999)
- Dude Descending a Staircase (2003)

==== EP/Singles ====
- Ain't Talkin' 'bout Dub (1997)
- Raw Power (1997)
- Carrera Rapida (1997)
- Lost in Space (1998)
- Stop the Rock (1999)
- Heart Go Boom (1999)
- Cold Rock The Mic / Crazee Horse (2000) (promo only)
- Charlie's Angels 2000 (2000)

=== Eye To Eye ===
==== Single ====
- Just Can't Get Enough (No No No No) (1999)

=== Maximum Roach ===
==== EP/Singles ====
- Maximum Roach EP (2002)
- Feel It (2002)

=== DJ Fresh ===
- Nervous Feat. Mary (2006)
