= Dude Descending a Staircase =

Studio album by Apollo 440
- Released: 22 July 2003
- Studio: Apollo Control (Camden, London)
- Genre: Big beat; electronic rock; trip hop
- Length: 95:20
- Label: Stealth Sonic; Epic; Sony Music UK
- Producer: Apollo 440; Stuart Crichton

Apollo 440 chronology
Gettin' High on Your Own Supply (1999)	Dude Descending a Staircase (2003)	The Future's What It Used to Be (2012)

Singles from Dude Descending a Staircase
- 1. "Dude Descending a Staircase" Released: 9 June 2003

Professional ratings
Review scores
Source	Rating
The Guardian	4/5 stars
Muzik	2/5 stars
Uncut	1.5/5 stars

Dude Descending a Staircase is the fourth studio album by English electronic music group Apollo 440. It was released as a double album on 22 July 2003 via Stealth Sonic Recordings and Sony Music UK. Recording sessions took place at Apollo Control in Camden, London. Production was handled by Apollo 440 and Stuart Crichton. It features guest appearances from Jay Dunne, Pete Wylie, Spoonface, The Beatnuts and Tommy Blaize among others. Its title and cover art reference the painting Nude Descending a Staircase by Marcel Duchamp.

The album's lead single and a title track peaked at number 58 on the UK Singles Chart.

== Critical reception ==
In his review for The Guardian, Adam Sweeting gave the album four out of five starts, writing: "Keen Liverpool FC supporters and pioneers of Brit electro, Apollo 440 come bounding back with a vast double CD that nobody could accuse of failing to deliver value for money. Where the band score is in their ability to blur the line between people and machinery: time and again you are left wondering whether that was a drummer or a drum machine, a pianist or merely another sample. The 18 tracks here cover a bit of everything, from speedy dance-pop with shouting to ripped-to-shreds disco, leavened with intermittent blasts of old-fashioned hard rock. They seem particularly fond of giant 1970s soul grooves with massed banks of strings, as though they had been loading up on old Isaac Hayes and Temptations records. They could do a lot worse". On the other hand, Uncut stuff reviewer gave it 1.5 out of 5 writing "Kudos to Apollo 440 for the title and sleeve here, wry references to Marcel Duchamp which may sail over the heads of some. It's a juicy electric foray into retro-futurist funk, the cheesy, strobe-lit spirit of which is captured on titles like "Disco Sucks" and "Escape To Beyond The Planet Of The Super Apes", featuring guest appearances that include a shouty turn from Pete Wylie. The second disc is more of a laid-back, trippy affair?most enticing of the tracks on offer being "Something's Got To Give". Nice, though a few more moments of splashdown wouldn't go amiss".

== Track listing ==
Disc 1
No.	Title	Writer(s)	Producer(s)	Length
1.	"Dude Descending a Staircase" (featuring The Beatnuts)	Howard Gray; Trevor Gray; Norman Fisher-Jones; Jerry Tineo; Lester Fernandez; Charles Davis	Apollo 440	5:06
2.	"Hustler Groove" (featuring Lightnin' Rod)	H. Gray; T. Gray; Fisher-Jones; Jalaluddin Mansur Nuriddin; Stuart Crichton	Apollo 440; Stuart Crichton	6:14
3.	"Disco Sucks" (featuring Ewan MacFarlane)	H. Gray; T. Gray; Fisher-Jones; Ewan MacFarlane	Apollo 440; Stuart Crichton	3:55
4.	"N'Existe Pas" (featuring Ewan MacFarlane)	H. Gray; T. Gray; Fisher-Jones	Apollo 440	6:45
5.	"Electronic Civil Disobedience" (featuring Jay Dunne)	H. Gray; T. Gray; Fisher-Jones; Jay Dunne	Apollo 440; Stuart Crichton (co.)	4:55
6.	"1, 2, 3, 4" (featuring Pete Wylie)	H. Gray; T. Gray; Fisher-Jones; Ian Hoxley; Pete Wylie	Apollo 440	3:45
7.	"Escape to Beyond the Planet of the Super Ape"	H. Gray; T. Gray; Fisher-Jones; Paul Kodish	Apollo 440	4:40
8.	"Time Is Running Out" (featuring Tommy Blaize)	H. Gray; T. Gray; Fisher-Jones	Apollo 440	5:00
9.	"Children of the Future" (featuring Lightnin' Rod)	H. Gray; T. Gray; Fisher-Jones; Nuriddin	Apollo 440	7:55

Disc 2
No.	Title	Writer(s)	Length
10.	"Diamonds in the Sidewalk" (featuring Jack Kerouac)	H. Gray; T. Gray; Fisher-Jones; Jean-Louis Lebris de Kéroua	3:41
11.	"Something's Got to Give" (featuring Xan)	H. Gray; T. Gray; Fisher-Jones; Lisa Lindley-Jones; Denise Lorraine Kessler; Pete Kessler	6:54
12.	"Christiane" (featuring Elizabeth Gray)	H. Gray; T. Gray; Fisher-Jones	5:37
13.	"Existe"	H. Gray; T. Gray; Fisher-Jones	6:00
14.	"Bulletproof Blues" (featuring Ewan MacFarlane)	H. Gray; T. Gray; Fisher-Jones; MacFarlane	6:21
15.	"Suitcase '88"	H. Gray; T. Gray; Fisher-Jones	4:31
16.	"Check Your Ego" (featuring Spoonface)	H. Gray; T. Gray; Fisher-Jones; Elroy Powell	4:09
17.	"Rope, Rapture & The Rising Sun"	H. Gray; T. Gray; Fisher-Jones	7:06
18.	"Bad Chemistry" (featuring Ewan MacFarlane)	H. Gray; T. Gray; Fisher-Jones	2:46
Total length:			1:35:20

Sample credits

- Track 1 contains elements from "When The Revolution Comes" written by Abiodun Oyewole
- Track 5 contains elements from "People Get Up" written by Ricardo Williams
- Track 10 reading from "Praised Be Man, fragment from San Francisco Blues" (1956) courtesy of Jack Kerouac
- Track 11 contains elements from "Sweatheart" written by Pete Kessler and Denise Davis

== Personnel ==
- Howard Gray – producer
- Trevor Gray – producer
- Norman "Noko" Fisher-Jones – producer
- Paul Kodish – drums
- Cliff Hewitt – drums
- Ewan MacFarlane – vocals (tracks: 3, 4, 14, 18), backing vocals
- Ian "Mary Byker" Hoxley – backing vocals
- Keith Holden – harmonica
- Stan Francisco – saxophone
- Stuart Crichton – backing vocals, cello, additional keyboards, programming, producer (tracks: 2, 3), additional producer (track 5)
- Tommy Blaize – vocals (track 8), backing vocals
- Andy Caine – backing vocals
- Paul "Harry K." Colbourne – backing vocals
- Kristine Pratt – whispering vocals
- Jerry "JuJu" Tineo – vocals (track 1)
- Lester "Psycho Les" Fernandez – vocals (track 1)
- Jalal "Lightnin' Rod" Nuriddin – vocals (tracks: 2, 9)
- Jay Dunne – vocals (track 5)
- Pete Wylie – vocals (track 6)
- Jack Kerouac – vocals (track 10)
- Lisa "Xan" Lindley-Jones – vocals (track 11)
- Elizabeth Gray – vocals (track 12), backing vocals
- Elroy "Spoonface" Powell – vocals (track 16)
- Chris Conway – recording (track 1)
- Ashley Krajewski – recording and mixing assistant
- Andrew Nichols – mixing assistant
- John Davis – mastering
- Tom Sheehan – photography
- Anthony Ausgang – painting
- John Birchall – hair stylist

== External; links ==
- Dude Descending A Staircase at Discogs (list of releases)
