= Krupa (song) =

1996 single by Apollo 440

Single by Apollo 440

from the album Electro Glide in Blue
- Released: 15 July 1996
- Genre: Electronic
- Length: 6:15 (album version); 4:01 (single/radio edit)
- Label: Sony Music
- Songwriters: Trevor Gray; Howard Gray; Noko
- Producer: @440

Apollo 440 singles chronology
"(Don't Fear) The Reaper" (1995)	"Krupa" (1996)	"Ain't Talkin' 'bout Dub" (1997)

Music video
- "Krupa" on YouTube

"Krupa" is a song by British big beat/electronic rock band Apollo 440, released in July 1996 by Sony Music as the first single from their second album, Electro Glide in Blue (1997). The cover credits it as appearing in an advert for Sunkist. The song is a homage to the Polish-American drummer Gene Krupa and is almost completely instrumental. The only lyrics in the entire song are "Yeah yeah" and "Now back to Gene Krupa's syncopated style" (a sample from dialogue in the 1976 film Taxi Driver), which are only repeated a couple of times. The main focus of the song is on the drumming rhythms, which were sampled from "The Ballroom Blitz" by Sweet. "Krupa" also has its own music video, shot in black-and-white, which shows various generic people on a normal day in a typical city. The video avoids showing people's faces in order to focus on the music.

== Critical reception ==
Tania Branigan from Melody Maker wrote, "Fabulous! Mambo party a-go-go. Smart samples, groovy organ, and there's even timpani. A tribute to virtuoso jazz drummer Gene Krupa, "Krupa" is sassy Nineties boogaloo." Another Melody Maker editor, Carl Loben, praised the song as "a fab funky techno workout shot thru' with futuristic synth-chords, it'll be Apollo 440's fourth consecutive Top 40 hit, or I'll eat my cat." A reviewer from Music Week gave it four out of five, saying, "This rousing acidic dance anthem [...] is perfect for the ebullient mood of summer 1996."

Daisy & Havoc from the Record Mirror Dance Update gave it five out of five, writing, "Having won the heads and minds of many DJs, crowds and journalists via some secretive 'Krupa' white labels, the cat is now out of its bag and owning up to being rockin' techno-gangster types Apollo 440. The 'Original' version of the track is still the knock-out secret ingredient with its amazing rock drums, raving mad enthusiasm, simple but blindingly effective driving synths and 'syncopated style'." They concluded, "It shows you can still make an amusing, over-the-top record without it conforming to a tired old obvious formula." Andrew Diprose from Smash Hits noted "the jazz meets house style" of the track.

== Charts ==
=== Weekly charts ===
Chart (1996)	Peak positions
Australia (ARIA)	85
Belgium (Ultratop 50 Flanders)	33
Germany (GfK)	38
Netherlands (Dutch Top 40 Tipparade)	12
Netherlands (Single Top 100 Tipparade)	12
UK Singles (Official Charts)	23

=== Year-end charts ===
Chart (1996)	Position
UK Club Chart (Music Week)	25
