= Drill Your Own Hole =

Studio album by Gaye Bykers on Acid
- Released: 6 June 1987
- Recorded: 1986–1987
- Studios: Orinoco Studios; Mad Mike Miller's ("T.V. Cabbage")
- Genres: Grebo; noise rock; neo-psychedelia
- Length: 41:52
- Label: Virgin
- Producer: Alex Fergusson

Gaye Bykers on Acid chronology
Drill Your Own Hole (1987)	Stewed to the Gills (1989)

Singles from Drill Your Own Hole
- 1. "Git Down (Shake Your Thang)" Released: 1987; 2. "All Hung Up" Released: 1987

Drill Your Own Hole is the debut album by British grebo and psychedelic rock band Gaye Bykers on Acid, released in 1987 on Virgin Records, becoming their first release for the label after signing to them in late 1986. After building up momentum through a couple of EPs in 1986, the band recorded Drill Your Own Hole with producer Alex Fergusson, mostly in South London. Seven of the songs on the album were also featured in an accompanying film, also called Drill Your Own Hole, that the band released alongside the album. The film was a parody of themselves and the music industry.

The music on the album displays the band's "mish-mash" of influences and styles and has become regarded as one of the first grebo albums. The album was a mild commercial success, spending one week at number 95 in the UK Albums Chart in November 1987. Initial quantities of the vinyl version of Drill Your Own Hole were pressed without a hole in the centre, so it was necessary to literally drill your own hole to play it. The album received critical acclaim from music critics, with praise aimed at the lighthearted humour and musical style, although its critical standing has somewhat diminished slightly in recent years.

== Background and recording ==
The eclectic Gaye Bykers on Acid formed in Leicester in 1986, led by Mary Byker on vocals, bass player Robber Byker, guitarist Tony Byker and drummer Kev Byker, none of whom were related and adopted their stage surnames for the band. Their first release, the Everythang's Groovy EP, was released in 1986 and produced by Jon Langford; however, the Nosedive Karma EP from 1987, their second release, was "the group's breakthrough," as Jason Ankeny of AllMusic later described it, "garnering considerable press attention for its use of hip-hop and dance beats – a major innovation in mid-'80s alternative rock." The band and their friends Crazyhead became known as innovators of grebo, a genre which played a crucial role in "bridging the gap between rock and hip-hop."

The publicity surrounding the band won them a contract with major label Virgin Records, for whom they immediately began work on their debut album Drill Your Own Hole. Unlike some bands who lose freedom when singing with major labels, signing to the label helped the band gain more freedom regarding money. Mary told one reviewer, "that's the way it should be, or else what's the point of signing to [a major label]. But there comes a point where the record company wants you to do something and see some return, I mean, let's be honest, they want to see us do well." During recording, the band remained "media darlings" and also played together under several pseudonyms, including the Lesbian Dopeheads on Mopeds who reported to be from New Zealand, and Rektum, who pretended they were an "Eastern European thrash metal band."

Alex Fergusson, formerly of the bands Alternative TV and Psychic TV, produced Drill Your Own Hole, employing "maximum gimmickry" and "supreme ability". The majority of the album was recorded at Orinoco Studios in South London, with the exception of "T.V. Cabbage" which was recorded in 1986 at Mad Mike Miller's. The sessions were engineered by Ken Thomas, with tape operating by Gail Lambourne, and with computer programming from Phillipp "Push That Dial" Erb. The band were simultaneously recording the songs for the album and for an accompanying film of the same name, and as such, the band recorded Kev's drums with an electric click track.

== Music ==
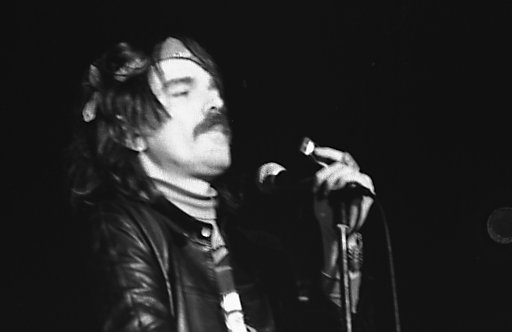
Captain Beefheart (pictured in 1974) was an influence on the album.

Mary Byker, describing Drill Your Own Hole as a "mish-mash" of styles, hoped that listeners would "hear different things each time" they listen to the album, as a result of the band's varied tastes and influences: "Personally, when I'm at home just listening to music I listen to Captain Beefheart and lots of stuff really. Tony the guitarist likes Hendrix and Zappa mainly. The bass player likes The Ramones and the drummer likes speed metal thrash bands. We all bring different influences into the band, this is why its so difficult to work sometimes. I mean, you can't put all those things together, it takes a long time to make it fit."

The album has become regarded as one of the first grebo albums, despite the band's distaste for the term. A defining characteristic of the album is its heavy, noisy usage of wah wah guitar; a journalist for Spin described the album as having "the most unrelenting, flagrant overuse of wahwah guitar since the first Stooges album, or maybe even the soundtrack for Shaft." Trouser Press felt the "noisy guitar rock" and solos were "intentionally chaotic". Similar to the band's previous work, the lyrics on the album generally humorously reference drug culture.

"Motorvate" features "gallivanting rhythms and nyah nyahing guitars." The almost electronic "Drive in Salvation" criticizes American evangelist Jimmy Swaggart, while "Zen Express" is, in the words of Mary, "about the nihilism of punk and the idealism of the hippie generation meeting head on. These people were saying the same things, both wanted some kind of change." It is represented in the accompanying movie with a bus full of hippies and another full of "postcard punks" colliding into each other." "Git Down (Shake Your Thang)" references Captain Beefheart in its opening line. "Call Me a Liar" is a cover version of the song by the Edgar Broughton Band, who Gaye Bykers on Acid were big fans of, while closing song "T.V. Cabbage" has been compared to MC5 and features a "1969"-inspired introduction.

== Release ==
Virgin Records released Drill Your Own Hole in the UK on 6 June 1987, while Caroline Records released the album in the United States. The album cover and lyric sheet were designed by cartoonist Ray Lowry, who was known for his artworks being published in the British music press. It was a mild success, reaching number 95 on the UK Albums Chart and staying on the chart for one week. Virgin released "Git Down (Shake Your Thang)" as the album's first single in October 1987 on seven and twelve-inch vinyl, backed with the B-side "Tolchocked By Kenny Pride," reaching number 54 on the UK Singles Chart and charting for three weeks. It was followed in December by second and final single "All Hung Up," which reached number 98 on the chart.

The first 1,000 copies of the LP version of the album were pressed without a hole in the vinyl, with the sleeve instructing listeners to "drill your own hole" in the vinyl so that they could play it. Lead vocalist Mary Byker later reflected: "There was about a thousand of them. There was a sticker on the front saying that it was a limited edition. I don't even have a copy; I wish I did! We could see the headlines: 'Kid Goes Crazy with Power Drill to Play Record.' Well, that's what we were hoping, anyway!" This version of the album later featured in Radio X's 2015 list of "great record sales gimmicks." In 2016, pop band Some Jerks similarly included the album in their list of "five unique merch items any diehard fan would want, surely." Levi Fuller of KEXP-FM related this edition to the band's playfulness:

"GBoA were very much a product, like so many great bands, of British art school in the 1980s. They seem to have thrived on never taking anything particularly seriously – as you might have guessed by their band name and their fake band name. They took this unseriousness to new heights (depths?) with the release of Drill Your Own Hole, somehow managing to convince Virgin records to release an LP without a hole drilled in the middle (so you'd have to follow the album title’s instructions in order to listen to the record – this was a couple decades pre-download codes, needless to say). I have to assume the radio promo copies came pre-drilled, given that there’s no mention of this phenomenon in the album cover reviews."

The album was accompanied by a 60-minute film, also titled Drill Your Own Hole and made with the help of Lowry who designed the cover. According to the Leicester Mercury, "the film, if anything, was even more mystifying" than the unusual vinyl edition of the album. Mary Byker later told B-Side Magazine: "The album is the soundtrack. It's a parody of us, the music industry and what we've let ourselves in for. We had the money at the time so we decided to go for it." The band's bass player Robber Byker, speaking about the film in 2013, said: "I can’t tell you what the film is about, and I was in it," and commented that although the film was understood by several people, "I think that tells you more about them than it does about the film." It was released on VHS by Virgin Music Video.

== Reception ==
Professional ratings
Review scores
Source	Rating
AllMusic	2/5 stars
New Musical Express	2/10

According to the Leicester Mercury, Drill Your Own Hole was released to "widespread acclaim." Howard Wuelfing Jr. of Spin was favourable, praising the album's protopunk influences and concluding: "Yeah, it's rude and mainly about raising an unholy racket. At times they could have expanded more effort on making actual songs out of this brou-haha, which at points sounds like bad Foetus. But is that so damned bad either? Nope." Sounds were similarly positive towards the album, and included it in their list of the best albums of 1987. Retrospective reviews have been more mixed. In The Rough Guide to Rock, Jonathan Bell refers to Drill Your Own Hole as "something of a missed opportunity, but there you go." Trouser Press were similarly mixed in their assessment, saying "the intentionally chaotic noisy guitar rock (dressed up in wah-wah and moronic solos) shows some improvement in skill and lyrics (which still rely on drug culture jokes); the selfconscious posturing is spottily ear-catching but basically horrible."

Only a year later, Mary Byker expressed dissatisfaction with the drum sound on the album, telling American publication B-Side: "They're not at all like how he plays live. We had to put them down on an electric click track machine because they're in the movie. Having said that though, I listened to it the other day and it really didn't sound that bad. When I'm here, it sounds like a section of it is different. American people seem to like it because the album is more popular here than it was in England." The Leicester Mercury said the album "was full of good ideas and original music, but ruined by a terrible ’80s production: big drum sounds and everything smothered in multiple layers of unnecessary reverb." Robber himself told the newspaper in 2013 that "I find it hard to listen to now." He later reflected that the era of the album's release brought the band several troubles, mostly concerning bills and money, after the band came under new management:

"Suddenly we were on this big record label with managers – and it just didn’t feel right. It didn't feel like us. [...] All we were interested in was the sex and the drugs and the rock and roll. We didn’t know what was happening behind the scenes."

After the release of Drill Your Own Hole, the band toured in promotion of the album. They had supported Motörhead and were intending to play a double billing concert with the Butthole Surfers, although it "didn't come off" despite "the college and record company wanting [the band] too;" Mary explained, "It's a bit of a strange thing. We have this new song called, 'Fairway to Heaven,' it's all about golf. But there was this big thing in the British press, I don't know if you say it, The Butthole Surfers were slagging us saying the Gaye Bykers On Acid ripped off their title. [The Butthole Surfers released a new album, Hairway to Steven] That's total bullshit 'cause we wrote that song in December. It's probably going to be the next single. We sorted it out with them." The band toured the United States in 1988: "We do a mix of everything," Mary told B-Side magazine, "including new songs. Since we never toured here before, we figure we'll go across the board and hit a point on what we've done so far."

== Track listing ==
All songs written by Gaye Bykers on Acid.

1. "Motorvate" – 4:38
2. "Call Me a Liar" – 3:14
3. "All Hung Up" – 4:34
4. "Zen Express" – 4:14
5. "World War 7 Blues" – 4:55
6. "Git Down (Shake Your Thang)" – 3:20
7. "After Suck There's Blow" – 4:51
8. "So Far Out" – 4:19
9. "Drive in Salvation" – 4:12
10. "T.V. Cabbage" – 3:30

== Personnel ==
- Ray Lowry – artwork
- Gaye Bykers on Acid – composers
- Ken Thomas – engineer
- Gail – tape operator
- Alex Fergusson – producer
- Phillip "Push That Dial" Erb – programmer (computer)

== Charts ==
=== Album ===
Chart (1987)	Peak position
UK Albums Chart	95

=== Singles ===
Single	Chart (1987)	Peak position
"Git Down (Shake Your Thang)"	UK Singles Chart	54
"All Hung Up"	UK Singles Chart	98
