= 6 (Pigface album) =

Studio album by Pigface
- Released: June 9, 2009
- Genre: Industrial rock
- Length: 48:43
- Label: Full Effect Records
- Producer: Martin Atkins

Pigface chronology
Easy Listening... (2003)	6 (2009)

6 is the sixth studio album by the industrial rock band Pigface. It was released in 2009 on Full Effect Records. The song "KMFPF", an acronym for "Kill Mother-Fucking Pigface", is a warped allusion to the band KMFDM.

Professional ratings
Review scores
Source	Rating
Allmusic	3.5/5 stars

== Track listing ==
No.	Title	Length
1.	"Electric Knives Club"	5:27
2.	"6.6.7.11"	3:37
3.	"Fight the Power"	4:54
4.	"KMFPF"	4:32
5.	"Mercenary"	3:32
6.	"Sanctify"	3:26
7.	"I Hate You in Real Life Too"	4:18
8.	"The Good, the Bad, and the Druggly"	5:06
9.	"Work to Come"	5:21
10.	"Dulcimer"	3:07
11.	"Up and Down"	5:28

== Personnel ==
- Martin Atkins – drums, programming, engineering, mixing, production
- Chris Connelly – vocals (1)
- Curse Mackey – vocals (1, 2), guitar
- Krztoff – vocals (2), guitar
- Hanin Elias – vocals (3, 4, 9)
- En Esch – vocals (2, 4)
- Charles Levi – bass
- Alex Møklebust – vocals (5)
- Kim Ljung – bass, vocals (5)
- Dan Heide – guitar (5)
- Patrick Ryan – loops (5)
- Tristan Rudat – guitar (5)
- Mary Byker – vocals (6)
- Noko – guitar (6), bass (6), composition (6)
- Jim Marcus – vocals (7)
- Martin Bowes of Attrition – vocals (10), synthesizers (10)
- Laurie Reade – vocals (10)
- Bradley Bills – yang-qin (10)
- The Enigma – vocals (11)
- Empty Gesture – artwork
- Engineer – Martin Atkins, Miguel Torres, Tom VX and Van Christie
- Performers – Anders Odden, Bradley Bills, Charles Levi, Curse Mackey, Dan Heide, En Esch, Hanin Elias, Harrison Atkins, Ian Atkins, Jim Marcus, Lee Fraser, Louis Svitek, Martin Atkins, Mary Byker, Noko, Patrick Ryan, Raziel Panic, Steve Denakas, Tamar Berk, Tristan Rudat, Van Christie
- Producer – Martin Atkins
