= Millennium Fever =

Studio album by Apollo 440
- Released: 30 January 1995
- Recorded: 1994
- Studio: Liverpool Anglican Cathedral, Liverpool; Marcus Studios and Ultrasonic Studios, London; XES Studios, Grünwald, Munich
- Genre: Progressive house; trance; big beat; electronic rock
- Length: 72:23
- Label: Stealth Sonic; Epic
- Producer: Apollo 440

Apollo 440 chronology
Millennium Fever (1995)	Electro Glide in Blue (1997)

Singles from Millennium Fever
- 1. "Astral America" Released: 10 January 1994; 2. "Liquid Cool" Released: 24 October 1994; 3. "(Don't Fear) The Reaper" Released: 13 March 1995

Professional ratings
Review scores
Source	Rating
Allmusic	link

Millennium Fever is the debut studio album by English electronic music group Apollo 440, released on 30 January 1995 by Stealth Sonic Recordings and Epic Records.

== Album cover ==
The album cover depicts a sculpture of the British artist Marc Quinn titled 'Self'.

== Track listing ==
1. "Rumble/Spirit of America" (Howard Gray, James Gardner, Noko) – 9:07
2. "Liquid Cool" (Howard Gray, James Gardner, Noko, Trevor Gray) – 12:02
3. "Film Me & Finish Me Off" (Noko, Trevor Gray, Howard Devoto) – 4:45
4. "I Need Something Stronger" (Howard Gray, Noko, Trevor Gray) – 7:34
5. "Pain is a Close Up" (Howard Gray, Noko, Trevor Gray, Howard Devoto) – 9:58
6. "Omega Point" (Howard Gray, Noko, Trevor Gray, Karl Leiker) – 7:35
7. "(Don't Fear) The Reaper" (Donald Roeser) – 5:27
8. "Astral America" (Howard Gray, Noko, Trevor Gray, Leonard Bernstein, Stephen Sondheim) – 4:33
9. "Millennium Fever" (Howard Gray, Noko, Trevor Gray) – 5:47
10. "Stealth Requiem" (James Gardner, Noko, Trevor Gray) – 5:35
