= Glenda Keam =

New Zealand composer and academic

Glenda Keam MNZM
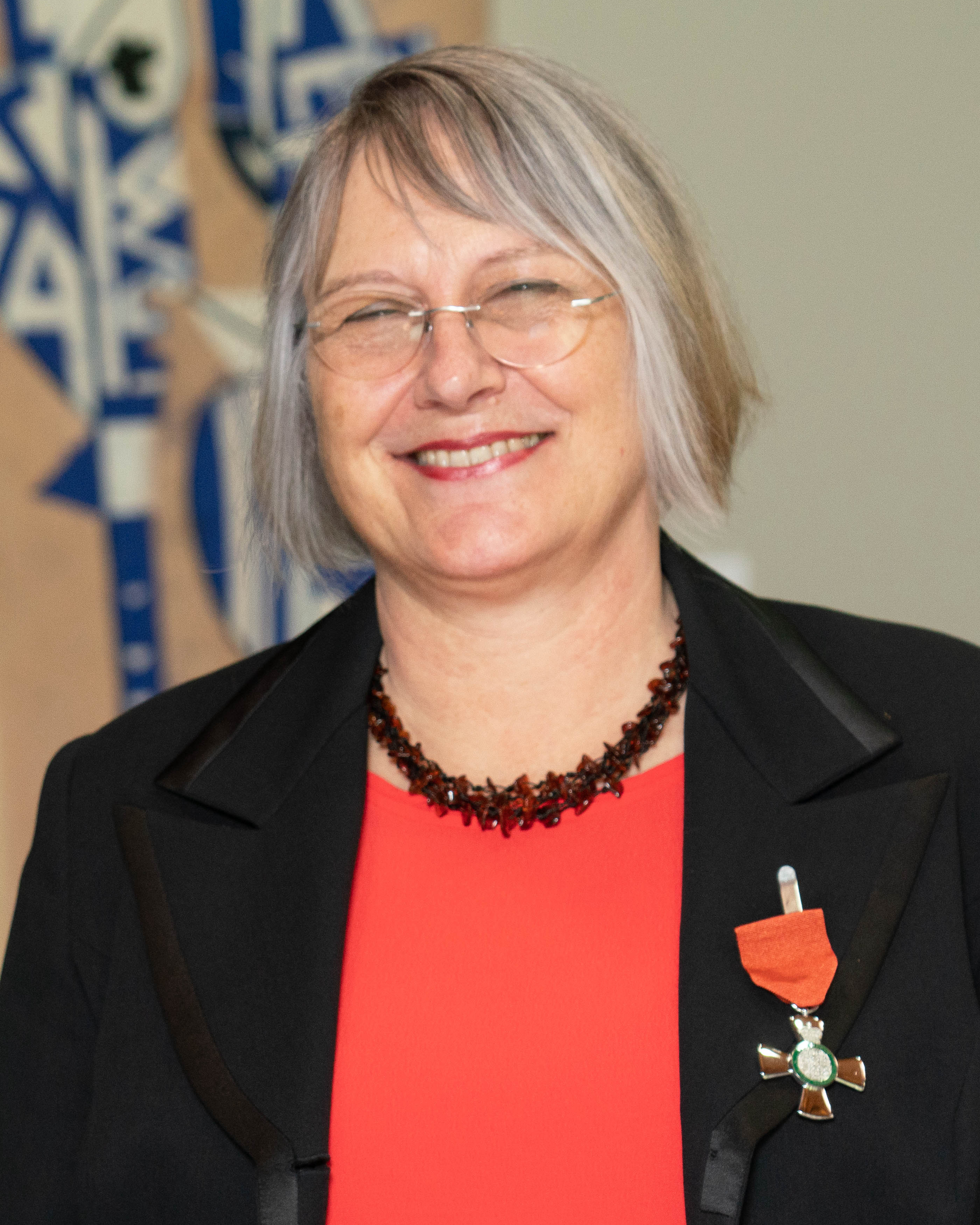
- Keam in 2021
- Born: Glenda Ruth Keam; 1960 (age 65–66)
- Spouse: James Gardner

Academic background
- Education: University of Auckland
- Thesis: Exploring notions of national style: New Zealand orchestral music in the late twentieth century (2006)
- Doctoral advisor: Fiona McAlpine

Glenda Ruth Keam MNZM (born 1960) is a New Zealand composer, music scholar, and educator. In 2021, Keam was appointed a Member of the New Zealand Order of Merit, for services to music and music education.

== Academic career ==
Keam completed a PhD titled Exploring notions of national style: New Zealand orchestral music in the late twentieth century at the University of Auckland in 2006. She also studied composition with Anthony Gilbert in Manchester. Keam then joined the faculty of Auckland. She was dismissed from her position but challenged it, and was found to have been unjustifiably dismissed. She was subsequently reinstated. Keam inaugurated the music programme at Unitec Institute of Technology, where she was director of music from 2006 until 2013. Keam was Head of Music at the University of Canterbury until her retirement.

Keam was elected president of the International Society for Contemporary Music in 2019, and was the first female president since the society's founding in 1922. She was previously vice president of the society from 2016. Keam was director of the society's 2022 World New Music Days, which were a series of concerts held in Auckland and Christchurch. She was president of the Composers Association of New Zealand for ten years, until 2017. Keam has directed a number of other music festivals, including the Asian Composers League Festival and the 2012 New Zealand in LA festival in California.

Keam's 2011 book, co-edited with Tony Mitchell and with an afterword by Don McGlashan, was described as "the 'go-to' general book on New Zealand music".

== Honours and awards ==
In the 2021 New Year Honours, Keam was appointed a Member of the New Zealand Order of Merit, for services to music and music education.

== Selected written works ==
- Keam, Glenda Ruth (2018). "Psathas, John". The New Grove Dictionary of Music and Musicians. doi:10.1093/gmo/9781561592630.article.2022551. Wikidata Q130345040.
- Keam, Glenda; Mitchell, Tony, eds. (2011). Home, land and sea: situating music in Aotearoa New Zealand. North Shore, N.Z.: Pearson.
