= Rapid Racer =

1997 video game

- Developer: Sony Computer Entertainment Europe
- Publisher: Sony Computer Entertainment
- Producers: Pascal Jarry; Richard Skews; Daniel Boutros
- Composer: Apollo 440
- Platform: PlayStation
- Release: EU: 1 October 1997; NA: 15 July 1998; JP: 15 July 1998
- Genre: Racing
- Modes: Single-player, Multiplayer

Rapid Racer, known as Turbo Prop Racing in North America, is a racing video game developed and published by Sony Computer Entertainment for the PlayStation. In the game, the player takes control of a motorboat and races around six different tracks. Eventually, all six tracks can be raced in mirrored mode, as well as at night.

By winning championships and completing bonus rounds (unlocked by collecting five yellow icons during a race on the first two-day tracks), players can unlock rewards, which they can use either to upgrade their boat or to unlock a higher-powered one.

== Gameplay ==
Rapid Racer was one of the first PlayStation games to take full advantage of the DualShock controller; the game allows steering with the analog sticks, and the gamepad vibrates during gameplay. The intensity of the vibrations depends on the type of water the player is in; calm rapids produce low vibrations, while heavier rapids produce high vibrations.

After reaching a certain point in the game, players can unlock the Fractal Generator. This feature allows the player to select from a large number of tracks beyond the normal six. Players can either allow the generator to select a track at random or manually input their own.

== Development ==
Work on Rapid Racer began in 1995 at Sony Computer Entertainment Europe. Six months were spent modelling the physics and behaviour of the water. The European version of the game runs at 50 frames per second, while the North American version runs at 60 frames per second.

The game's soundtrack was composed by Apollo 440 (Loudmouth in Turbo Prop Racing). The game's main theme, "Carrera Rapida" by Apollo 440, was released as a single and on their 1997 album Electro Glide in Blue.

== Reception ==
Reception

Aggregate score
Aggregator	Score
GameRankings	74%

Review scores
Publication	Score
AllGame	2/5
CNET Gamecenter	8/10
Edge	6/10
Electronic Gaming Monthly	5.125/10 (Note: In Electronic Gaming Monthly's review of the game, one critic gave it 6.5/10, two others gave it each a score of 4.5/10, and the other gave it 5/10.)
EP Daily	8.5/10
Famitsu	27/40
Game Informer	8.5/10
GameFan	84%
GameRevolution	A−
GameSpot	4.5/10
IGN	8/10
Next Generation	4/5
Official U.S. PlayStation Magazine	4/5
Dengeki PlayStation	75/100, 75/100, 80/100, 75/100
The PlayStation	73/100, 64/100, 80/100

Rapid Racer received above-average reviews according to the review aggregation website GameRankings. In Japan, where the game was released on 16 July 1998, Famitsu gave it a score of 27 out of 40.

GameSpot criticised the courses for being very narrow and limited, but praised the game's "hip-hop/techno" music, comparing it favourably to that of Wipeout. Edge highlighted the fluid graphics and frame rate, but criticised the unoriginal gameplay and unrealistic boat handling, which can frustrate players. The magazine concluded: "As a technological showcase, Rapid Racer is a truly impressive achievement. As a game in its own right, however, it falls disappointingly short of the expectations aroused by its glorious visuals." GamePro said of the game, "The sounds never rise above average and the controls are way too sensitive (even with the analog controller), which makes racing in the already arduous turns a difficult task and adds to [the] game's general frustration level. With such severe visual and control maladies, Turbo Prop doesn't even come close to crossing the finish line." (Note: GamePro gave the game 1/5 for graphics, 3/5 for sound, 1.5/5 for control, and 2/5 for fun factor.) However, Next Generation said, "Anyone who thinks that PlayStation is finished should check this game out."
