= James Gardner (musician) =

New Zealand musician

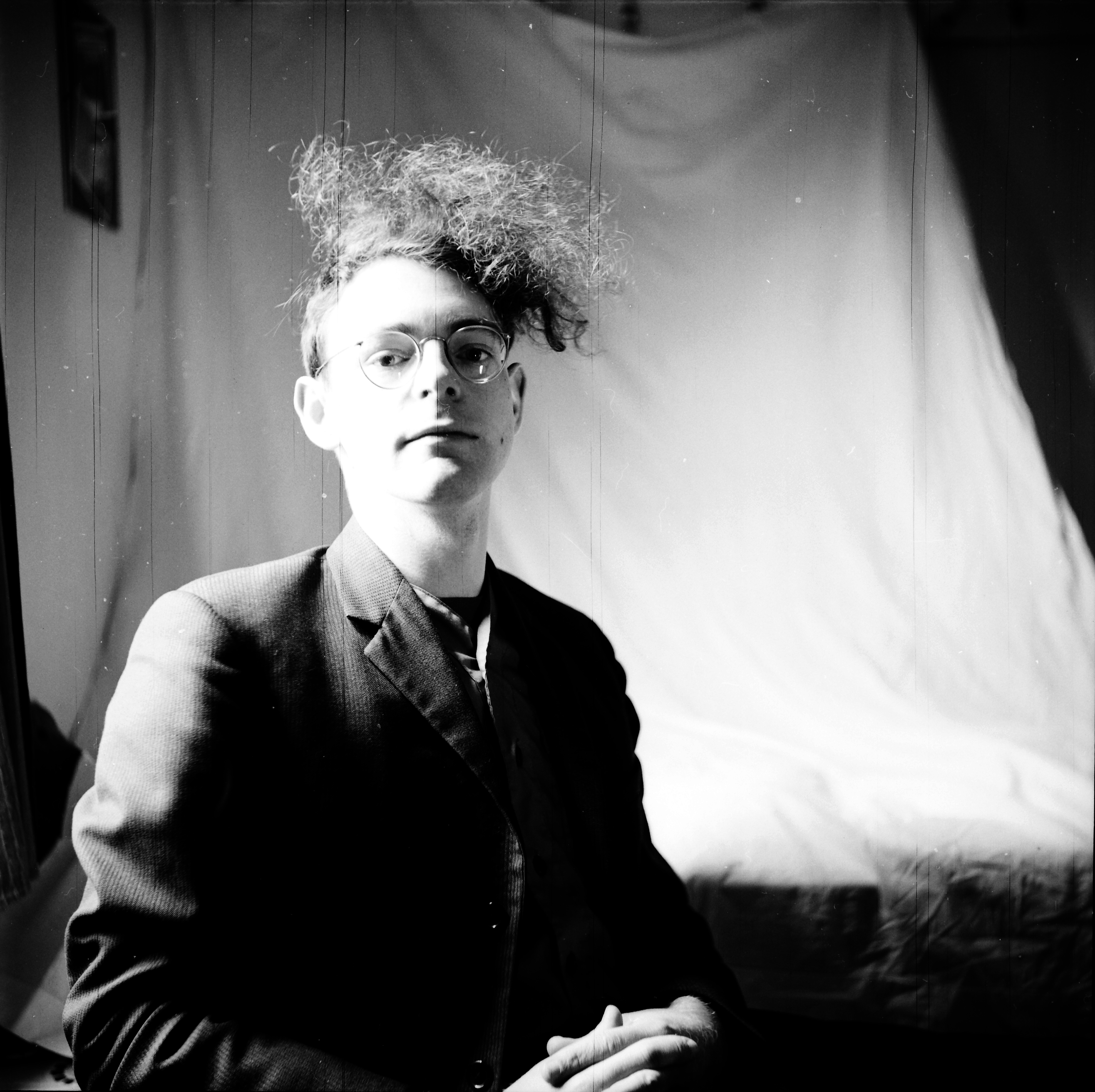
- James Gardner during his tenure in The Umbrella

Background information
- Born: 1 June 1962 (age 63); Liverpool, England
- Origin: Auckland, New Zealand
- Genres: Electronic, breakbeat
- Occupations: DJ, record producer
- Years active: 1990–present

James Gardner (born 1 June 1962) is an English born New Zealand musician and composer. Gardner was born in Liverpool, England. He was a school friend of Noko and Howard Gray, with whom he later formed the band Apollo 440, Gardner spent much of the 1980s in London playing and programming keyboards and synthesizers for a variety of artists. During this time he also formed the short-lived band The Umbrella (which included Noko), where the influence of John Barry can be seen. Later, Gardner was involved with Luxuria, the band formed by Noko and Howard Devoto. In 1990, Gardner along with Noko, Howard Gray, and Trevor Gray, co-founded Apollo 440, an electronic music group.

In 1993, Gardner left Apollo 440 in order to concentrate on composition, which had been a parallel interest, and he moved to New Zealand in 1994 with his (now) wife Glenda Keam, becoming a citizen of the country in 2001. In 1996, he set up the contemporary music ensemble 175 East, of which he was, until passing the role onto composer Samuel Holloway in 2011, director and occasional conductor, and his compositions have been played and broadcast throughout the world. From 2004 to 2005, he was the composer in residence at the Victoria University of Wellington.

Gardner is also a broadcaster on music on the New Zealand radio station Radio New Zealand Concert. He teaches music at the University of Canterbury in Christchurch, Unitec and the University of Auckland, and writes and presents shows covering contemporary music with shows on characters as diverse as John Cage, Frank Zappa and the James Bond soundtracks of John Barry.
