= The Future's What It Used to Be =

Studio album by Apollo 440
- Released: 30 January 2012
- Genres: Electronica, electronic rock, breakbeat, drum and bass, house
- Length: 41:52
- Label: Radikal
- Producer: Apollo 440

Apollo 440 chronology
| Dude Descending a Staircase (2003) | The Future's What It Used to Be (2012) |

The Future's What It Used to Be is the fifth studio album by the British electronic band Apollo 440. It was released in January 2012 by Radikal Records. The single of the same name of the album is the theme song of pro wrestling company Pro Wrestling Eve.

== Track listing ==
| No. | Title | Writer(s) | Length |
|---|---|---|---|
| 1. | "Stay Frosty" | Gray, Noko, Gray, MacFarlane | 2:47 |
| 2. | "The Future's What It Used to Be" | Gray, Noko, Gray, MacFarlane, Ashley Krajewski | 4:50 |
| 3. | "Smoke & Mirrors" | Gray, Noko, Gray, MacFarlane | 4:57 |
| 4. | "Stealth Cantorum" | Gray, Noko, Gray, MacFarlane | 0:11 |
| 5. | "A Deeper Dub" | Robert Clivillés, David Cole | 5:25 |
| 6. | "Love is Evil" | Gray, Noko, Gray, MacFarlane | 5:11 |
| 7. | "Odessa Dubstep (feat. TNMK)" | Gray, Noko, Gray, MacFarlane | 4:58 |
| 8. | "Motorbootee" | Gray, Noko, Gray, MacFarlane, Ian Hoxley | 4:15 |
| 9. | "Traumarama" | Gray, Noko, Gray, MacFarlane | 3:52 |
| 10. | "Fuzzy Logic" | Gray, Noko, Gray, MacFarlane | 5:40 |
| 11. | "Music Don't Die" | Gray, Noko, Gray, MacFarlane | 4:44 |
| Total length: | | | 41:52 |

== Personnel ==
Apollo 440

- Howard Gray
- Noko
- Trevor Gray
