= Crazyhead =

English band

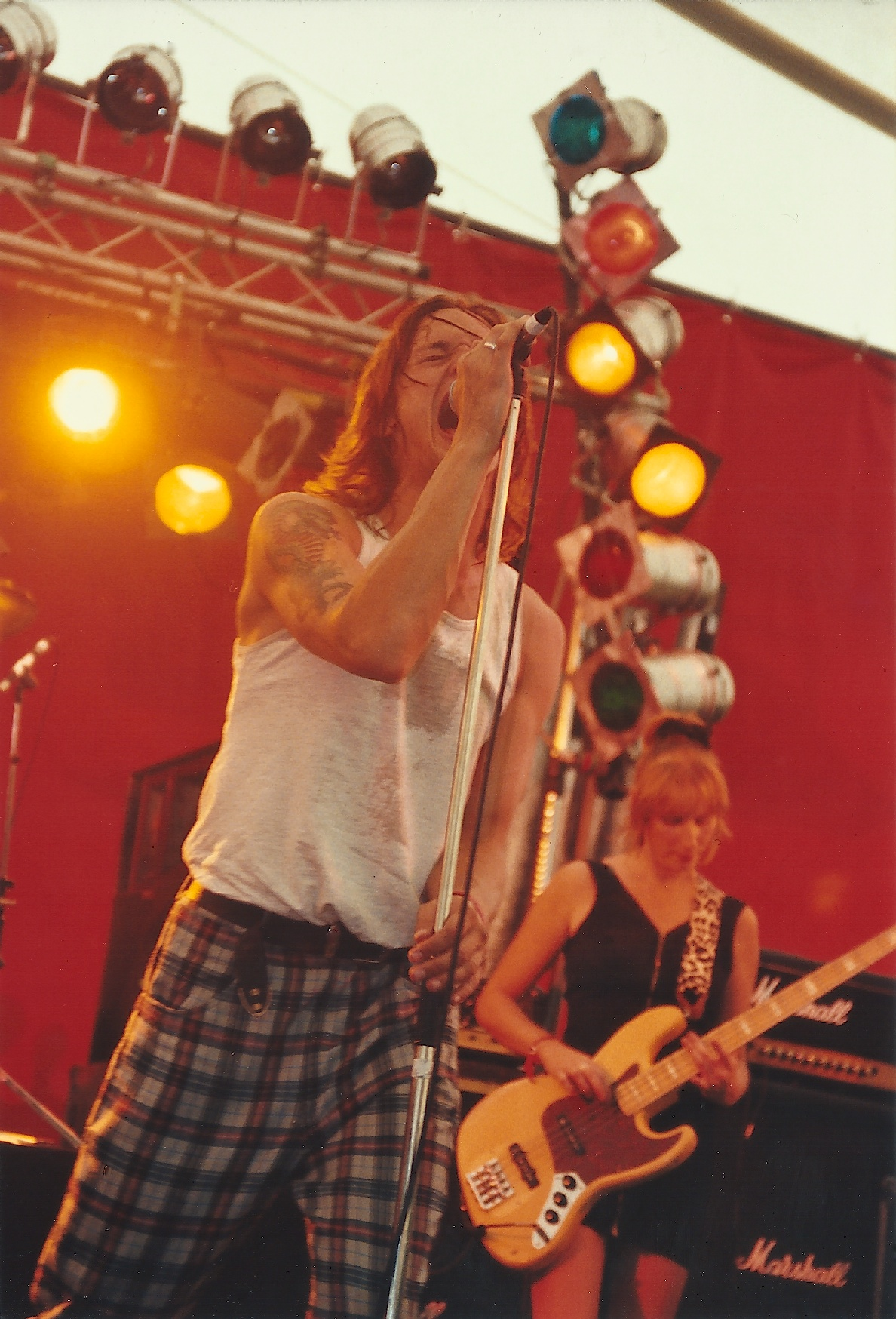
- Crazyhead (1995)

Background information
- Origin: Leicester, England
- Genres: Garage punk, grebo
- Years active: 1986–2000, 2017–present
- Labels: Food, Parlophone, Revolver, Snatch
- Members: Ian R. Anderson; Kevin Bayliss; Alex Peach; Robert Morris; Peter Creed
- Past members: Richard Bell; Christine Wigmore

Crazyhead are an English garage punk band from Leicester, England. Though lumped in with the grebo scene, they were more influenced by the garage rock of the late 1960s, as well as bands like the Ramones, The Stooges and Captain Beefheart. They have often described themselves as an "urban bastard blues band", and their songs range in theme from trenchant social commentary to the surreal, but always with an underlying vein of black humour.

== Personnel ==
Current band members:

- Kev Reverb (Kevin Bayliss) – Guitar, keyboards, sitar
- Anderson (Ian R. Anderson) – Vocals
- Vom (Robert Morris) – Drums
- Porkbeast (Dr. Alex Peach) – Bass, Backing Vocals (1985–1990, 2017)
- Peter Creed – Guitar (1997–2000, 2017)

Previous band members:

- Fast Dick (Richard Bell) – Guitar (1985–1997)
- Christina X (Christine Wigmore) – Bass (1990–2000)

In the studio and on tour, the band were regularly joined by trumpeter Tony Robinson and the horn section of Leicester synth-pop group The Swinging Laurels:

- Gaz Birtles – Saxophone
- John Barrow – Saxophone
- Tony Robinson – Trumpet

On Crazyhead releases, this brass trio was credited under the pseudonym The Space Bastards.

The brass section on "Rags" was The Phantom Horns:

- John Thirkell – Trumpet
- Gary Barnacle – Saxophone
- Peter Thoms – Trombone
- PP Arnold and Katie Kissoon sang backing vocals on the single, "Rags".

== History ==
Formed in 1986, the band signed to the independent record label, Food, later that year and their début single, "What Gives You The Idea That You're So Amazing, Baby?", reached number 2 in the UK Indie Chart in March 1987. For the rest of the year they toured extensively, supporting The Cult, then Julian Cope, and also played at the Glastonbury Festival. Their second single "Baby Turpentine" reached number 4 in the Indie Chart.

In mid-1988, their third single "Time Has Taken Its Toll on You" reached No. 65 in the UK Singles Chart, their label now owned by EMI. The band embarked on another UK tour to promote their début album Desert Orchid, released in October 1988, along with another single, "Rags", and then toured Europe supporting Iggy Pop. They then released the Have Love, Will Travel EP (which reached #68) before embarking on yet another UK tour.

In 1989, they made two brief tours of the United States, and appeared at the Reading Festival. At the behest of the British Council, they played an international music festival in Moscow, and in early 1990, along with Skin Games and Jesus Jones they became one of the first western bands to tour post-Nicolae Ceauşescu Romania. Later that year they played at the Namibian Independence Day concert to an audience of 50,000.

The band were dropped by Food Records in 1989, and their second album Some Kind of Fever was released by Revolver Records. In 1992 they gigged across Europe, and in 1993 embarked on a tour of the UK to promote an album of cover versions, Live in Memphis, even though the deal to release it fell through.

Over the next few years, Crazyhead made sporadic live appearances. In 1997, they released Fucked By Rock – a collection of previously unreleased material, demo versions, and live tracks, and an EP of new material, 13th Floor. They again toured the UK, supporting The Mission on a number of UK dates. They started recording material for a new album, but the departure of Anderson to work in Thailand and Cambodia (where he continued to perform, in bands such as the Lazy Jazz Drunks and Stiff Little Punks) meant the end of Crazyhead. They played a farewell gig in Leicester on 21 December 2000.

Kev Reverb and Vom went on to play in an alternative rock band called Scaley Fuego, based in Leicester. This three-piece band was fronted by singer/bassist Stewart Brackley.

In 2013, Porkbeast, Vom and Anderson joined Robber Byker from Gaye Bykers on Acid to form a new band called Swamp Delta. They subsequently released a number of singles and played at the Bearded Theory and Rebellion festivals during the summer of 2014. A tour of venues across the UK followed in the summer of 2015. Ian Anderson went on to front The Scavengers – a punk/rockabilly influenced band, based in Brighton.

Crazyhead reformed in 2017 for a series of autumn shows throughout the UK. They played at the Indie Daze 4 festival in October 2017, with further shows taking place during 2018: at the 100 Club in Oxford Street, London on 4 May; at the Uprising Festival in Leicester on 26 May; and at the Bearded Theory Festival (main stage) on 27 May.

Due to the retirement abroad of guitarist Reverb, Crazyhead's final concert of the 2019 tour took place at Leicester's Donkey Bar on Friday 30 August.

Crazyhead reformed for the Mad Dog Went Insane Tour in 2023, playing Leicester, Leeds, Manchester, London and Nottingham venues.

== Discography ==
=== Singles ===
Year	Title	Label	Cat. No.	UK Singles Chart	UK Indie Chart
1987	"What Gives You The Idea That You're So Amazing, Baby?"	Food	FOOD 8		2
1987	"Baby Turpentine"	Food	FOOD 10	96	4
1988	"Time Has Taken Its Toll on You"	Food	FOOD 12	65	
1988	"Rags"	Food	FOOD 14	78	
1990	"Everything’s Alright"	Revolver Records	REV 64		

=== EPs ===
Year	Title	Label	Cat. No.	UK Singles Chart	Notes
1989	Have Love Will Travel	Food	Food 16	68	
1989	The Food Christmas EP	Food	Food 23	63	Shared release with Jesus Jones and Diesel Park West
1998	Chemical Lunch				Self-released CD-R of cover versions
1999	13th Floor	Snatch Records	ATOG1		

=== Albums ===
Year	Title	Label	Cat. No.	Other information
1988	Desert Orchid	Food	LP1	
1990	Some Kind of Fever	Revolver Records	REV 162	
1995	'Live in Memphis'			Unreleased covers album
1995	Grind	Bliss Out	BOE-003	
1999	Fucked By Rock	Snatch Records	Gash 3	Compilation of demos, unreleased tracks and new material

== Afterwards ==
- Kev Reverb worked as a record producer and engineer at his 'Memphis Studio' (in Leicester, named in tribute to Elvis Presley) and has worked with such diverse artists as Cornershop, Kevin Hewick, Zodiac Mindwarp, Diesel Park West, MJ Hibbett, Volcano The Bear, Bill Drummond and Satan's Little Heartbreakers.
- Robert Morris (Vom) has played drums with Zodiac Mindwarp intermittently since 1993, while Reverb played bass and produced Zodiac's 2001 album I Am Rock. Morris has also been a member of Diesel Park West since 2007. Contrary to what various websites claim, Vom was not the drummer with Doctor and the Medics; their drummer was Steve Ritchie – also nicknamed "Vom". As of 2013, Morris was also playing in the band Swamp Delta, alongside other original Crazyhead members.
- Christina Wigmore went on to work in community arts. With Debs Bracher, she formed Timeless Banditz, who released a 12" EP of house music called Hose Down on Communicato Records in 2004. She also played bass with two Leicester bands: Nylon 9 and Jesuscarfish.
- Porkbeast gained a PhD in social history. In 2013, he formed the South Wigston garage rock band Swamp Delta, together with Robber Byker from Gaye Bykers on Acid, Ian Anderson and Robert 'Vom' Morris.
- Anderson gained a degree in fine art, completed a TEFL certificate, and worked as a teacher of English in Poland, the Czech Republic, China, Thailand and Cambodia. He returned to the UK in 2012/13 and joined up with other former members of Crazyhead in Swamp Delta. He also performed with Brighton-based punk/rockabilly/60s garage-rock band The Scavengers, who released two albums on Flicknife Records: Picked From the Bone (2019) and Rights of Salvage (2020). He also recorded tracks with Kev Byker and Ubertroll.
- The original line-up of Crazyhead met up again in March 2013 but nothing new transpired. Vom, Porkbeast and Anderson then went on to form the band Swamp Delta with Robber Byker from Gaye Bykers on Acid. They played at the Bearded Theory festival and at Rebellion Festival in the summer of 2014.
- In 2017, Indie Daze/Mute Elephant booked Crazyhead for a reunion appearance at the Indie Daze 4 festival on 7 October, along with House of Love, Voice of the Beehive, Apollo 440, and others. A full-scale reunion tour was then scheduled for the autumn of 2017: "Late 80s Urban Bastard Blues legends Crazyhead have agreed that 25 years is far too long to leave their legacy of late 80s Rock Monsterism to gather dust. With the new Ed Sheeran generation blissfully unaware of the power of Crazyhead’s blistering live experience, the time is ripe for a rock and growl rebirth."
- Tony Robinson continued his session work, most notably joining The Beautiful South's horn section alongside Gaz Birtles. Following the band's split in 2007, Robinson, Birtles, and other former members formed The South in 2009 to perform their back catalogue. Robinson officially left the group in 2017.
