= Gaye Bykers on Acid =

English rock band

- Origin: Leicester, England
- Genres: Grebo; neo-psychedelia
- Years active: 1984–1990, 2016–present
- Labels: Virgin Records, Naked Brain, Major League Productions (MLP)
- Past members: Ian Hoxley; Tony Horsfall; Ian Reynolds; Kevin Hyde; William Morrow; Boz
- Website: gayebykersonacid.co.uk

Gaye Bykers on Acid (GBOA) are an English rock band from Leicester, and one of the founder members of the grebo music scene. They later released both thrash punk and dance music albums under various aliases.

== Personnel ==
- Mary Byker (Ian Garfield Hoxley) – vocals
- Tony Byker/Phlegm Lubricant/Tony Shuttleburger/Sven Eleven- (Tony Horsfall) – guitar
- Robber Byker (Ian Reynolds) – bass guitar
- Rocket Ronnie (William Samuel Ronald Morrow) – turntablist
- Kev Byker/Cubehead Buffalo Hyde/Gavina Hyde/Kenny Pride – (Kevin Hyde) – drums
- Billy Boy Byker (Will Crewdson)

== History ==
Gaye Bykers on Acid were formed in late 1984 by Ian Reynolds (Robber) and Ian Hoxley (Mary). They were later joined by guitarist and art student Tony Horsfall and drummer Kevin Hyde. Their first gig was at The Princess Charlotte in Leicester in mid-1985.

Their first releases – the single Everythang's Groovy and the Nosedive Karma EP – were both recorded in Leeds with Jon Langford of The Mekons, and released on the InTape label. They then signed to Virgin Records releasing the albums Drill Your Own Hole and Stewed to the Gills. Initial quantities of the vinyl version of Drill Your Own Hole were pressed without a hole in the centre, so it was necessary to drill your own hole to play it. The album spent one week at number 95 in the UK Albums Chart in November 1987.

They also played gigs (dressed in women's clothing) under the name 'Lesbian Dopeheads on Mopeds', supporting themselves, and thus getting paid twice. They also performed as a fictitious East German thrash punk band "Rektüm" (they claimed to have jumped over the Berlin Wall), recording an LP Sakredanus and an EP Real Horror Show under the name.

However management problems and poor sales meant that they were dropped by Virgin in 1989. They subsequently released the album Cancer Planet Mission on their own record label, Naked Brain. They also recycled and used the band name 'The Purple Fluid Exchange' (PFX) to release their dance cross-over material. It was at this time that Rocket Ronnie joined the band as DJ, sample player and dance advisor.

In 1990 they released Pernicious Nonsense, their last studio album, recorded with Jon Langford at the Stone Room Studios and at Alaska St. Studios with house engineer Chelo Zambelli. After difficult tours in the US and UK the band broke up, the final blow being when the label Rough Trade, who distributed their Naked Brain recordings, went bankrupt owing them and many other bands considerable amounts of cash.

Two compilation albums were subsequently released on the Receiver record label, From the Tomb of the Near Legendary… (1992) and Gaye Bykers on Acid (1993). A further bootleg compilation of Virgin records studio demo's was sold by their ex-manager (Tracy Lamott) to Cherry Red Records – Everything's Groovy (2001).

Tony and Kev collaborated in 1993 to form 'Steroid', releasing a CD album entitled "Jism Harvester" on Clay Records, a crazy industrial mish mash of samples and guitar riffs. 25 years later they followed it up with "Scrotox Ulcer" in May 2018 and "Baptising The Alien" in September 2018.

The groups Total Anthology on DVD is available from Robber Byker at their official site and via their MySpace page.

The group often included samples from other artists or films in their music, usually from cult films such as Repo Man, Taxi Driver or Dune.

On 22 February 2016, it was announced that Gaye Bykers on Acid would be reforming for a final performance at Indie Daze in October 2016. This was later expanded into a nine date tour.

In August 2023 the band played more high-profile festival dates including Beautiful Days and Rebellion with their new guitarist Will Crewdson (going under the name Billy Boy Byker).

== Afterwards ==
- Kevin Hyde formed the band G.R.O.W.T.H. and released an LP and 12" single. He formed his new musical outlet (Rockshed Productions) (SHED) with Tom Stanley and still various GBOA band members.
- Tony returned to creating artworks, living and working in the Commonwealth of Dominica, West Indies. He is now currently working on new music and videos as Tony Byker, with his own brand of Electro-Acoustic vibes in Tokyo, Japan.
- Robber now works as an underground DJ and film-maker. He records under the names Robber Byker and Surfin' Bernard. Robber Byker and Zoe Reynolds have released several Wonky Techno records on Shed Records, and remixes on Midtone. In 2013, with Robber on lead guitar alongside Porkbeast, Vom and Anderson from Crazyhead, a new band was formed, named Swamp Delta. The band has released a number of singles to date and played at the Bearded Theory and Rebellion festivals during the summer of 2014. They plan to release more new music and play more festivals in the summer of 2015. Robber also mastered and remixed tracks from Ian Anderson of Crazyhead's latest venture, The Scavengers, on their debut demo, Picked Off The Bone. Robber later joined with Greg Semple as Twat Monkey. His newest venture is Ubertroll.
- Mary Byker has sung in the bands Pigface, Hyperhead, Apollo 440, and Maximum Roach. His current group is called The Jungle. He also composes music for TV adverts. In 2011 he joined a new incarnation of Pop Will Eat Itself, replacing original member Clint Mansell. Now he has joined with Noko from Apollo 440 to form Am I Dead Yet?
- A tribute band called Lesbian Dope Heads on Mopeds occasionally play biker events.
- Ronnie Rocket went on to open the Ambient Music store in London's Soho and still runs the associated label Worm Interface.

== Discography ==
=== Singles ===
Year	Title	Format	Label
1986	"Everythang's Groovy"	7-inch and 12-inch single	InTape
1987	"Nosedive Karma"	7-inch, 10-inch and 12-inch single	InTape
1987	"Git Down (Shake Your Thang)"	7-inch, box set and 12-inch single	Virgin
1987	"All Hung Up"	7-inch, 12-inch, and 2x12-inch with Picture Disc	Virgin
1989	"Hot Thing"	7-inch, 10-inch and 12-inch single	Virgin
1991	"S.P.A.C.E." (as PFX)	12-inch single	Naked Brain
1991	"Killer Teens in New Orleans" (as PFX)	12-inch single	Naked Brain

=== EPs ===
Year	Title	Format	Label
1998	The BBC Sessions	EP	Strange Fruit
1989	Real Horror Show (as Rektüm)	12-inch EP	Manic Ears

=== Albums ===
Year	Title	Format	Label
1987	Drill Your Own Hole	LP/CS/CD and Video album	Virgin
1989	Stewed to the Gills	LP/CS/CD album	Virgin
1989	GrooveDiveSoapDish	LP/CD album	Bleed
1990	Cancer Planet Mission	LP/CS/CD album	Naked Brain
1990	Sakredanus (as Rektüm)	LP/CS/CD album	PSI
1990	Pernicious Nonsense (as PFX)	LP/CS/CD album	Naked Brain
1992	Gaye Bykers on Acid	CD album	Receiver
1993	From The Tomb of the Near Legendary...	CD album	Receiver
2001	Everything's Groovy	CD album	Cherry Red
2012	A Big Bad Beautiful Noize	CD album	Major League Productions
