= Morada =

Morada may refer to:

== Places ==
- Morada, California, a census-designated place, and suburb of Stockton, in San Joaquin County
- Morada, Mindelo, city center
- Morada Nova, a municipality in the state of Ceará in the Northeast region of Brazil.

== Other uses ==
- Morada (company), a British curtain manufacturer, in Altham, Lancashire
- Morada (Odisha Vidhan Sabha constituency)
- Morada, a religious meeting hall associated with the Penitente Brotherhood of New Mexico
