= Electro Glide in Blue =

Studio album by Apollo 440
- Released: 3 March 1997
- Studio: Apollo Control, Camden, London
- Genre: Drum and bass; electronic rock; big beat
- Length: 71:55
- Label: Stealth Sonic; Epic; 550
- Producer: Apollo 440

Apollo 440 chronology
Millennium Fever (1994)	Electro Glide in Blue (1997)	Gettin' High on Your Own Supply (1999)

Singles from Electro Glide in Blue
- 1. "Krupa" Released: 15 July 1996; 2. "Ain't Talkin' 'bout Dub" Released: 3 February 1997; 3. "Raw Power" Released: 23 June 1997

Professional ratings
Review scores
Source	Rating
AllMusic	4.5/5 stars
NME	7/10
Smash Hits	3/5 stars

Electro Glide in Blue is the second studio album by the English electronic music group Apollo 440. It was first released on 3 March 1997 in the United Kingdom by Stealth Sonic Recordings and Epic Records and on 9 September 1997 in the United States by 550 Music. The album features Charles Bukowski, Billy Mackenzie, and a tribute to Gene Krupa; all three of whom had died by the time of the album's release. Its title is a reference to the 1973 film Electra Glide in Blue.

== Track listing ==
1. "Stealth Overture" – 1:00 (Trevor Gray, Elizabeth Gray, Noko)
2. "Ain't Talkin' 'bout Dub" – 4:30 (Edward Van Halen, Alex Van Halen, Michael Anthony, David Lee Roth, Noko)
3. "Altamont Super-Highway Revisited" – 6:33 (Noko)
4. "Electro Glide in Blue" – 8:36 (Trevor Gray, Howard Gray, Ewan MacFarlane)
5. "Vanishing Point" – 7:27 (Noko)
6. "Tears of the Gods" – 6:18
  Dialogue: Charles Bukowski (Noko, Trevor Gray, Howard Gray, Dr. John Creaux)
7. "Carrera Rapida" (Theme from "Rapid Racer") – 6:48 (Noko, Trevor Gray, Howard Gray, Ian Hoxley)
8. "Krupa" – 6:15 (Noko, Trevor Gray, Howard Gray)
9. "White Man's Throat" – 4:54 (Noko, Howard Gray, Ian Hoxley)
10. "Pain in Any Language" – 8:40
  Vocals: Billy Mackenzie (Noko, Billy MacKenzie)
11. "Stealth Mass in F#m" – 6:35 (Trevor Gray, E.Gray)
12. "Raw Power" – 3:50 Not available on some releases. (Noko, Trevor Gray, Howard Gray, Ian Hoxley)

== Certifications ==
Region	Certification	Certified units/sales
Poland (ZPAV)	Gold	50,000^{*}
^{*} Sales figures based on certification alone.

== Release history ==
Region	Release date	Label	Format	Catalogue	Notes
UK	3 March 1997	Stealth Sonic Recordings	CD	SSX2440CD	Does not include "Raw Power"
UK	3 March 1997	Stealth Sonic Recordings	2×LP	SSX2440LP	Does not include "Raw Power"
UK	3 March 1997	Stealth Sonic Recordings	MC	SSX2440C	Does not include "Raw Power"
UK	30 June 1997	Stealth Sonic Recordings/Epic	CD	SSX2440CDR	
UK	30 June 1997	Stealth Sonic Recordings/Epic	MC	SSX2440CR	
UK	30 June 1997	Stealth Sonic Recordings/Epic	MD	SSX2440MDR	
USA	9 September 1997	550 Music	CD	BK 68513	
