= Ain't Talkin' 'bout Dub =

1997 single by Apollo 440

Single by Apollo 440

from the album Electro Glide in Blue
- Released: 3 February 1997
- Genre: Big beat; electronic rock; drum and bass
- Length: 4:31
- Label: Stealth Sonic; Sony
- Songwriters: Michael Anthony; David Lee Roth; Alex Van Halen; Edward Van Halen
- Producer: Apollo 440

Apollo 440 singles chronology
"Krupa" (1996)	"Ain't Talkin' 'bout Dub" (1997)	"Raw Power" (1997)

Music video
- "Ain't Talkin' 'bout Dub" on YouTube

"Ain't Talkin' 'bout Dub" is a song by English electronic music group Apollo 440. It was released in February 1997 by Stealth Sonic and Sony Records as the second single from their second studio album, Electro Glide in Blue (1997). Successful on the charts in Europe, it peaked at number one in Romania and within the Top 10 in Denmark, Finland, Norway, Sweden (number two) and the UK. The song is based on a sample of the lead guitar line of American rock group Van Halen's 1978 song "Ain't Talkin' 'bout Love". The beginning of the song contains a sample from the 1971 science-fiction film The Andromeda Strain.

The single's front cover features a photograph of Member of Parliament Jeremy Thorpe wearing Jimi Hendrix's Gibson Flying V guitar backstage at a Jimi Hendrix Experience concert at the Royal Festival Hall in 1967.

== Critical reception ==
Music Week gave the song a score of four out of five, adding that "the Scouse beat merchants take the Run DMC route by bolting breakbeats on to a Van Halen track and then layering in some spliffy toasting chatter. Could be huge." Also Daisy & Havoc from the magazine's RM Dance Update gave it four out of five. They concluded that "anyone who samples Van Halen deserves a good share of this week's votes for that alone, and A440 use this as a basis for several resounding journeys into sound." Gerald Martinez from New Sunday Times noted that on the track, the American rock group's "Ain't Talkin' 'bout Love" "get the techno treatment from Apollo Four Forty who combine that metal-pop tune with reggae dub touches. Hear it to believe it!" Andrew Diprose from Smash Hits named it a "drum 'n' bass mayhem".

== Music video ==
The accompanying music video for "Ain't Talkin' 'bout Dub" was directed by James Brown and premiered in February 1997.

== Track listings ==
- UK 12" vinyl
1. "Ain't Talkin' 'bout Dub" (Matrix remix) - 6:03
2. "Ain't Talkin' 'bout Dub" (@440 instrumental version) - 4:59
3. "Ain't Talkin' 'bout Dub" (Nok-Hop remix) - 6:19
4. "Ain't Talkin' 'bout Dub" (Booby Trap remix) - 7:05
- CD single, CD1
1. "Ain't Talkin' 'bout Dub" (@440 radio edit) - 3:56
2. "Glam" (Rock N Roll Part III) - 8:13
3. "Ain't Talkin' 'bout Dub" (Matrix remix) - 6:03
4. "Ain't Talkin' 'bout Dub" (Nok-Hop remix) - 6:19
- CD single, CD2
1. "Ain't Talkin' 'bout Dub" (@440 instrumental version) - 5:00
2. "Ain't Talkin' 'bout Dub" (Armand Van Helden Moonraker edit) - 6:50
3. "Ain't Talkin' 'bout Dub" (Escape from New York edit) - 7:18
4. "Ain't Talkin' 'bout Dub" (Technology Park remix) - 5:56
5. "Ain't Talkin' 'bout Dub" (Joey the Butcher remix) - 7:04
6. "Ain't Talkin' 'bout Dub" (Booby Trap remix) - 7:06

== Charts ==
=== Weekly charts ===
Chart (1997)	Peak position
Australia (ARIA)	64
Austria (Ö3 Austria Top 40)	32
Belgium (Ultratop 50 Flanders)	14
Belgium (Ultratop 50 Wallonia)	26
Denmark (IFPI)	6
Europe (Eurochart Hot 100)	17
Finland (Suomen virallinen lista)	3
France (SNEP)	29
Germany (GfK)	13
Iceland (Íslenski Listinn Topp 40)	11
Ireland (IRMA)	24
Israel (Israeli Singles Chart)	4
Netherlands (Dutch Top 40)	14
Netherlands (Single Top 100)	15
Norway (VG-lista)	4
Romania (Romanian Top 100)	1
Scotland (OCC)	15
Sweden (Sverigetopplistan)	2
Switzerland (Schweizer Hitparade)	18
UK Singles (Official Charts)	7
UK Dance (OCC)	5
US Dance Club Play (Billboard)	15

=== Year-end charts ===
Chart (1997)	Position
Belgium (Ultratop 50 Flanders)	77
Europe (Eurochart Hot 100)	63
Germany (Media Control)	60
Romania (Romanian Top 100)	4
Sweden (Topplistan)	21
