= Murata =

Murata (written: 村田 lit. "village rice paddy") may refer to:

== People ==
- Murata (surname)

== Places ==
- Murata, Miyagi, Japan, a town
- Murata (San Marino), a Sanmarinese village

== Other uses ==
- Murata Manufacturing, a manufacturer of electronic components and technology
- Murata Machinery, also known as Muratec, a manufacturer of industrial and fax machines
- Murata rifle, a Japanese military black-powder rifle of the 19th century
- S.S. Murata, a Sanmarinese football club
