= SX Superstar =

2003 video game

- Developer: Climax Solent
- Publisher: Acclaim Entertainment (Note: Released under the AKA Acclaim label in the United States)
- Platforms: GameCube, PlayStation 2, Xbox
- Release: NA: 30 June 2003 (GC, Xbox); EU: 4 July 2003
- Genre: Racing
- Modes: Single-player, multiplayer

SX Superstar is a racing video game developed by Climax Solent and published by Acclaim Entertainment for Xbox, GameCube and PlayStation 2.

== Modes ==
- Arena involves racing through an arena, usually they have large jumps and sharp turns.
- Baja: It is very similar in style to uphill as it has the player going through gates throughout the level, while racing against others.
- Stunt: In stunt you attempt to accumulate as many points as you can in the given time.
- World Record: This generally has the player attempting to do very difficult things. For example, jumping over the Grand Canyon.
- Uphill: Has the player going through gates set throughout the level, an arrow guides the player.

== Reception ==
Reception

Aggregate scores
Aggregator	Score		
Aggregator	GameCube	PS2	Xbox
GameRankings	56.59%	62.45%	52.13%
Metacritic	59/100	N/A	53/100

Review scores
Publication	Score		
Publication	GameCube	PS2	Xbox
Electronic Gaming Monthly	3.83/10	N/A	N/A
Game Informer	6/10	N/A	6.5/10
GamePro	N/A	N/A	3.5/5
GameSpot	6.7/10	N/A	6.7/10
GameSpy	2/5	N/A	N/A
GameZone	N/A	N/A	6/10
IGN	3.6/10	N/A	3.6/10
Nintendo Power	3.1/5	N/A	N/A
Official Xbox Magazine (US)	N/A	N/A	3.7/10
X-Play	N/A	N/A	2/5

The game was met with mixed reception. GameRankings and Metacritic gave it a score of 63% for the PlayStation 2 version; 57% and 59 out of 100 for the GameCube version; and 52% and 53 out of 100 for the Xbox version.
