= Hyperhead =

British alternative rock band

- Origin: London, England
- Genres: Alternative rock
- Years active: Early 1990s–c.1993
- Label: Devotion/Triple X
- Past members: Mary Mary; Martin Atkins; William Tucker; Karl Leiker; Paul Dalloway; Oscar; Chin; Keith

Hyperhead were a British alternative rock band formed by former Gaye Bykers on Acid singer Mary Mary (a.k.a. Ian Garfield Hoxley) in the early 1990s.

== History ==
After Gaye Bykers on Acid split up, Mary Mary joined Pigface before forming Hyperhead, which included his Pigface colleagues Martin Atkins (also formerly of PiL and Killing Joke) and William Tucker (also previously of Revolting Cocks and My Life with the Thrill Kill Kult), along with bassist Karl Leiker and guitarist Paul Dalloway. The band released the album Metaphasia in 1992 on Devotion Records.

A touring line-up of Mary, Leiker and Dalloway, with Oscar (guitar), Chin (drums), and Keith (percussion) built a strong reputation with their live performances.

Two EPs followed but the band split up without releasing another album.

== Discography ==
=== Albums ===
- Metaphasia (1992), Devotion (issued in the US (1994), Triple X Records)

=== EPs ===
- Teenage Mind (1992), Devotion
- Terminal Fear (1993), Devotion
