= Tommy Blaize =

British musician (born 1963)

- Born: 5 March 1963 (age 63); Toxteth, Liverpool, Merseyside, England
- Genres: Soul; pop
- Instruments: Piano, guitar
- Website: Official website

Tommy Blaize (born 5th March 1963) is a British singer, songwriter, and television performer, best known as the lead singer and long-time vocalist with the house band on BBC One's Strictly Come Dancing.

He has sung on the programme since its launch in 2004 and is one of the few original contributors still involved, alongside Craig Revel Horwood and Anton Du Beke.

With a career spanning more than five decades, Blaize has worked with artists including Diana Ross, Queen, The Beach Boys, Amy Winehouse, Joe Cocker, Tina Turner, Stevie Wonder and Robbie Williams, and has released his own solo material.

== Early life and background ==
Blaize was born in Toxteth, Liverpool, to a father who served in the Royal Navy. He was aged nine when he and his two younger brothers were spotted performing in the street by talent scout Hilda Fallon and subsequently performed their first professional gig as The Blaize Brothers, playing clubs across north-west England during the 1970s.

The trio were discovered by a local workman who introduced them to promoter Hilda Fallon, who helped launch their career.

After the group split when he was sixteen, Blaize studied at what is now the Liverpool Institute for Performing Arts (LIPA).

He later spent five years in Ibiza and moved to London, working for two decades as a session musician and backing vocalist.

He also appeared as a child performer on the television talent show Junior Showtime.

== BBC Strictly Come Dancing ==
Blaize has been part of Strictly Come Dancing since its first series in May 2004

He performs live each week with fellow singers Andrea Grant, Jesse Smith, and Hayley Sanderson, learning up to seventeen songs per show and rehearsing throughout the weekend before each live broadcast.

In a 2017 interview on ITV’s Lorraine, he explained that the singers receive new material each Monday, record guide vocals mid-week, rehearse with the band on Friday, and perform live on Saturday, often covering songs in Punjabi, Tamil, Spanish, and Korean.

He has spoken warmly of Sir Bruce Forsyth, paid tribute to Len Goodman, and praised Shirley Ballas as “an amazing head judge".

== Collaborations and live performances ==
Blaize has worked with some of the world's most renowned artists, including Stevie Wonder, Queen, The Beach Boys, Diana Ross, Amy Winehouse, Phil Collins, Robbie Williams, and Joe Cocker and toured with Robbie Williams on the 2014 Swings Both Ways world tour.

He sang at both Nelson Mandela's 90th and 95th birthdays with artists such as Amy Winehouse, Stevie Wonder and Aretha Franklin.

He also sang at the 2007 wedding of Sir Rod Stewart and Penny Lancaster.

He has performed with Guy Barker’s Big Band Christmas at the Royal Albert Hall (2018, 2023, 2025).

Blaize has performed at Cheltenham Jazz Festival multiple times as a featured guest artist .

In 2024, he embarked on his first national solo tour, performing 51 dates across the UK in an intimate “living-room” stage setting. During the tour, he dedicated songs to his late Strictly colleagues Sir Bruce Forsyth and Len Goodman.

In 2025, Blaize performed with the Young Voices children’s choir on their UK arena tour, including eight sold-out O₂ Arena shows.

He has also appeared on tour with the National Youth Jazz Orchestra (NYJO) performing the music of Ray Charles.

Blaize has expressed enthusiasm for working with young musicians, describing it as inspiring to see new generations experience large-scale live performance.

== Television and radio appearances ==
On 23 December 2019, Blaize appeared in the season premiere of BBC television series The Goes Wrong Show, "The Spirit of Christmas", as himself.

In May 2022, Blaize and his mother Maureen were featured in the BBC series DNA Family Secrets, presented by Stacey Dooley, where it was revealed that his grandfather had been an American GI named Augusta Walls who was originally a farmer, born in 1914, from Fayette County, Tennessee, who died in 1978. Maureen was his only child, although he never knew. One of Maureen's cousins, Joe Nathan Walls, was a saxophonist with the blues musician Howlin' Wolf.

In March 2024, Blaize was a guest on BBC Radio 4's Saturday Live.

In December 2025, Blaize was a contestant on ITV's The Chase Celebrity Christmas Special.

== Solo Recordings ==
Blaize released his debut album Life & Soul in December 2017 through UMOD / Universal Music, which spent two weeks in the top 40 of the UK Albums Chart and features classic soul songs including “Let's Stay Together” and “My Girl”
