= Apollo 440 =

English electronic group

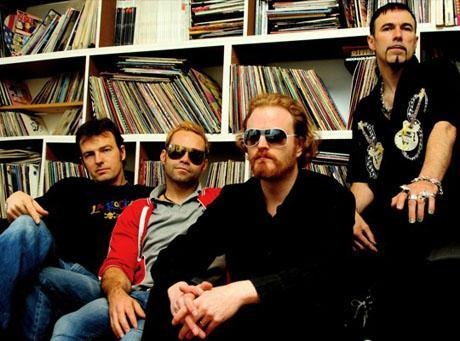
- Apollo 440 in 2009

Background information
- Origin: Liverpool, England
- Genres: Big beat; electronic; alternative rock; drum and bass; trip hop
- Years active: 1990–present
- Labels: Stealth Sonic; Epic; 550; Radikal
- Members: Trevor Gray; Howard Gray; Noko; Ian Hoxley; Cliff Hewitt; Michael Cusick; Ashley Krajewski
- Past members: James Gardner; Paul Kodish; Rhoda Dakar; Ewan MacFarlane

Apollo 440 (also known as Apollo Four Forty or @440) are an English electronic music group formed in Liverpool in 1990. The group have written, recorded and produced five studio albums, collaborated with and produced other artists, remixed as Apollo 440 and as their ambient cinematic alter ego Stealth Sonic Orchestra, and created music for film, television, advertisements and multimedia. They notched up ten UK top 40 singles with three top tens, and had a chart presence worldwide.

The group's name comes from the Apollo program and the frequency of concert pitch—the A note at 440 Hz, often denoted as "A440"—and the Sequential Circuits sampler/sequencer, the Studio 440. They changed the writing of their name from Apollo 440 to Apollo Four Forty in 1996, though they switched back for their latest album. To date, Apollo 440's remixes have included OMD, U2, P. Diddy/Jimmy Page, Jean-Michel Jarre and Ennio Morricone. Among their Stealth Sonic Orchestra remixes are a series of Manic Street Preachers singles.

== History ==
Apollo 440 were formed by the brothers Trevor and Howard Gray, with fellow Liverpudlians Noko and James Gardner. Trevor, Howard and Noko all attended the same school, Old Hall High School in Maghull, in the mid to late 1970s. Gardner left after the recording of the first album. All members sing and contribute a profusion of samples, electronics and computer-based sounds.

After relocating to the Camden area of London, Apollo 440 recorded their debut album, Millennium Fever, in 1994 and released it on 30 January 1995 on their own Stealth Sonic Recordings label (distributed by Epic Records). Their combination of rock, breakbeat and ambient music has been successful on the record charts as well as on the dance floor.

The band had been best known for its remixes until the release of Liquid Cool in the UK. However, it was not until the success of the singles "Krupa" and "Ain't Talkin' 'bout Dub" that their own musical efforts were brought to international attention – particularly the latter single, which helped propel Apollo 440 into the spotlight.

In 2007, the band played a tribute gig to the late Billy Mackenzie.

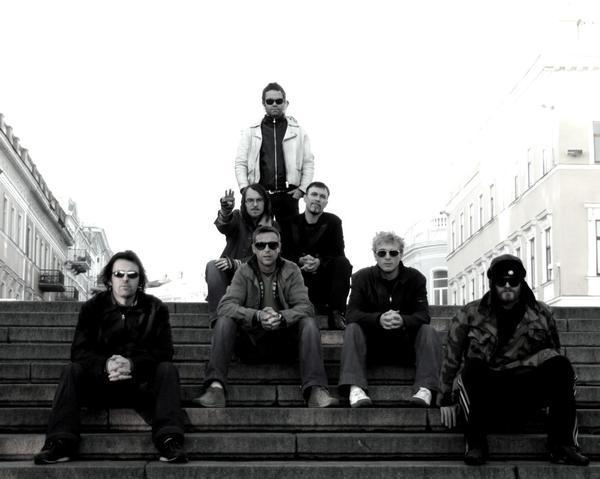
Apollo 440 in 2007

Apollo 440's fifth album, The Future's What It Used to Be, became available for download on the iTunes Store from 23 March 2012.

Collaborators over the years have included Jeff Beck, Jean Michel Jarre, Billy Mackenzie, Ian McCulloch and Tomoyasu Hotei.

The band resides in Islington, London, having once again moved its headquarters.

== Members ==
=== Current members ===
- Howard Gray – production, keyboards, samples, programming (1990–present)
- Trevor Gray – production, keyboards, samples, programming (1990–present)
- Noko (Norman Fisher-Jones) – production, vocals, guitars, keyboards, samples, programming (1990–present)

=== Former members ===
- James Gardner – bass, keyboards, programming, samples (1990–1993)

=== Current touring members ===
- Cliff Hewitt – drums, programming (1994–present)
- Mary Byker (Ian Hoxley) – vocals, raps (1997–present)
- Harry K (Paul Colbourne) – turntables, samples, vocals (1997–present)
- Ashley Krajewski – keyboards, samples, backing vocals (2007–present)
- Michael Cusick – bass, backing vocals (2008–present)

=== Former touring members ===
- MC Stevie Hyper D – raps (1994)
- Rhoda Dakar – vocals (1994–2004)
- Paul Kodish – drums, programming (1997–2000)
- Rej ap Gwynedd – bass (1997–2008)
- Jonathan "Stan" White – bass (2004)
- Ewan MacFarlane – vocals (2007–2018)

== Discography ==
=== Studio albums ===
List of albums, with selected chart positions
Title	Album details	Peak chart positions								
Title	Album details	UK	AUS	AUT	FIN	GER	NOR	NL	SWE	SWI
Millennium Fever	Released: 30 January 1995; Label: Stealth Sonic, Epic; Format: CD, LP, cassette, digital download	117	—	—	—	—	—	—	—	—
Electro Glide in Blue	Released: 3 March 1997; Label: Stealth Sonic, Epic; Format: CD, LP, cassette, digital download	62	—	26	7	32	37	55	54	33
Gettin' High on Your Own Supply	Released: 6 September 1999; Label: Stealth Sonic, Epic; Format: CD, MiniDisc, digital download	20	75	41	—	50	—	—	—	44
Dude Descending a Staircase	Released: 22 July 2003; Label: Stealth Sonic, Epic; Format: CD, LP, cassette, digital download	—	—	—	—	—	—	—	—	—
The Future's What It Used to Be	Released: 30 January 2012; Label: Stealth Sonic, Reverb; Format: CD, digital download	—	—	—	—	—	—	—	—	—
"—" denotes a recording that did not chart or was not released in that territory.

=== EPs ===
- Rumble EP (1993)
- A Deeper Dub EP (2011)

=== Singles ===
List of singles, with selected chart positions, showing year released and album name
Year	Title	Peak chart positions										Album
Year	Title	UK	AUS	AUT	FIN	GER	IRL	NLD	SWE	SWI	US Dance	Album
1991	"Lolita"	—	—	—	—	—	—	—	—	—	—	non-album tracks
1991	"Destiny"	—	—	—	—	—	—	—	—	—	—	non-album tracks
1991	"Blackout"	—	—	—	—	—	—	—	—	—	—	non-album tracks
1994	"Astral America"	36	—	—	—	—	—	—	—	—	—	Millennium Fever
1994	"Liquid Cool"	35	—	—	—	—	—	—	—	—	—	Millennium Fever
1995	"(Don't Fear) The Reaper"	35	—	—	—	—	—	—	—	—	—	Millennium Fever
1996	"Krupa"	23	85	—	—	38	—	—	—	—	7	Electro Glide in Blue
1997	"Ain't Talkin' 'bout Dub"	7	64	32	3	13	24	15	2	18	15	Electro Glide in Blue
1997	"Raw Power"	32	—	—	17	—	—	—	44	—	—	Electro Glide in Blue
1997	"Carrera Rapida"	—	—	—	—	—	—	—	—	—	—	Electro Glide in Blue
1998	"Rendez-Vous 98" (with Jean Michel Jarre)	12	—	—	—	—	—	—	—	—	—	non-album track
1998	"Lost in Space"	4	—	—	—	74	18	90	—	—	—	Gettin' High on Your Own Supply
1999	"Stop the Rock"	10	79	—	—	47	26	—	—	—	11	Gettin' High on Your Own Supply
1999	"Heart Go Boom"	57	81	—	—	—	—	—	—	—	—	Gettin' High on Your Own Supply
2000	"Cold Rock the Mic / Crazee Horse" (promo only)	—	—	—	—	—	—	—	—	—	—	Gettin' High on Your Own Supply
2000	"Charlie's Angels 2000"	29	—	64	—	95	—	70	—	75	—	Charlie's Angels
2001	"Say What?" (with 28 Days)	—	23	—	—	—	—	—	—	—	—	Stealing Chairs
2003	"Dude Descending a Staircase" (feat. The Beatnuts)	58	—	—	—	—	—	—	—	—	—	Dude Descending a Staircase
"—" denotes a recording that did not chart or was not released in that territory.

=== Media appearances ===
Over 50 different Apollo tracks have featured in movies, trailers, TV, games and ads worldwide, including globally branded cars, beers, soft drinks, phones, audio and software. They have also written two entire soundtracks for the Sony PlayStation and provided the themes for ITV World Cup '98 and Formula 1 2000 to 2002 coverage, as well as Liverpool F.C.'s Official 2006 FA Cup song.

== Video games ==
- 1996: Adidas Power Soccer (PlayStation version) - "Rumble"/"Spirit of America"
- 1997: Rapid Racer (Turbo Prop Racing), format: PlayStation CD (Audio CD plus game data track). The soundtrack was also available as an extra CD, as part of the limited edition double CD single release of "Carrera Rapida"
- 1999: FIFA 2000 - "Stop the Rock"
- 1999: Gran Turismo 2 (NTSC version) - "Cold Rock the Mic"
- 2000: Spider-Man (2000), featured a remix of "Spider-Man theme song"
- 2001: ATV Offroad Fury - "Yo! Future"
- 2001: Gran Turismo 3: A-Spec (NTSC version) - "Stop the Rock" (Mint Royale Mix)
- 2002: F1 2002 (PS2 and PC versions) - "Blackbeat"
- 2003: SX Superstar - "Cold Rock the Mic"
- 2004: EyeToy: AntiGrav - ???
- 2004: EyeToy: Groove - "Hustler Groove" (instrumental)
- 2004: Gran Turismo 4 - "Start the Car"
- 2004: Gran Turismo 4 - "Hold the Brakes"
- 2007: Forza Motorsport 2 - "SolidRockRazorSteel"
- 2007: Forza Motorsport 2 - "Rollin' Down the Highway"
- 2007: Cars Mater-National Championship - "Stop the Rock"
- 2012: LittleBigPlanet Karting - "Odessa Dubstep" (Instrumental)
- 2025: Madden 26 - "Stop the Rock"

== Music in film ==
- Spawn (1997) – the soundtrack: "This Is Not A Dream" (UK Mix), with Mark Sandman of Morphine on vocals
- Spawn Bonus Track (No. 15)
- Club Hits 97/98 (1997) – soundtrack to music used during Sky Sport's coverage of Premiership football, featured "Ain't Talkin' 'bout Dub"
- Species II (1998) – featured "Carrera Rapida"
- Lost in Space (1998) – featured "Lost In Space (Theme)"
- Charlie's Angels (2000) – featured a remix of the Charlie's Angels theme song
- Boys and Girls (2000) – featured "Stop the Rock" in a club scene
- Cut (2000) – featured "Stop the Rock"
- Gone in 60 Seconds (2000) – featured "Stop the Rock"
- Driven (2001) – features "Stadium Parking Lot" in a montage of several songs during a chase scene
- Spider-Man (2002) – featured "Altamont Super-Highway Revisited" in one of the trailers
- Resident Evil (2002) – featured "Wall of Death"
- The Sopranos – in "Whoever Did This" (2002) – "The Man with the Harmonica" played over the end credits
- 101 Dalmatians II: Patch's London Adventure (2003) – featured "One of a Kind"
- S.W.A.T. (2003) – featured "Time Is Running Out"
- Eurotrip (2004) – featured "Make My Dreams Come True"
- Chasing Liberty (2004) – featured "Stop the Rock"
- Victoria's Secret Fashion Show 2007 – featured "Stop the Rock" in the segment "Sureally Sexy"
- Disaster Movie (2008) – featured "Stop the Rock" in the teaser trailer

== Vocalists ==
Apollo 440 has a history of working with various vocalists. While their debut album, Millennium Fever, was sung almost exclusively by Noko, he has since withdrawn from his vocalist role in the band to make way for various guest appearances, including, but not limited to:

- Billy Mackenzie on "Pain in Any Language" on Electro Glide in Blue, the last song he recorded.
- Ewan MacFarlane on "Electro Glide in Blue" on Electro Glide in Blue and numerous tracks on the Dude Descending a Staircase album – performed as live vocalist until 2018.
- Xan on "Something's Got to Give" on Dude Descending a Staircase
- Jalal Nuriddin on "Children of the Future" on Dude Descending a Staircase
- The Beatnuts on the title track of Dude Descending a Staircase
- Elizabeth Gray on "Christiane" on Dude Descending a Staircase and "Stealth Mass" on Electro Glide in Blue
- Mary Byker (Ian Hoxley) on "Ain't Talkin' 'bout Dub", "Raw Power" on Electro Glide in Blue and "Stop the Rock" on Gettin' High on Your Own Supply – performed as live vocalist until 2004.

== Tributes ==
=== Jean Baudrillard ===
The album, Millennium Fever, is a tribute to the French philosopher Jean Baudrillard. Since the release of that album, other references to Jean Baudrillard's works have appeared.

- The track, "Astral America", references Baudrillard's book America, where the term originates.
- The track, "The Perfect Crime", references Baudrillard's book of the same name.
- The lyrics of "Stealth Requiem" reference the Baudrillardian concept of hyperreality. At one point, a female voice says, "Ravishing hyperrealism ... Mind blowing", and later quotes directly from America (1988): "The exhilaration of obscenity; the obscenity of obviousness; the obviousness of power; the power of simulation."

=== Marcel Duchamp ===
The title and cover art of the album Dude Descending a Staircase are parodies of Nude Descending a Staircase, No. 2 by Marcel Duchamp.

=== Alcor ===
The song "Liquid Cool" (released as a B-side in 1993, as a single in 1994, and featured on the Millennium Fever album) is a tribute to Alcor, a company focused on pursuing research into and the organisation of cryonisation. The topic is also referenced in the title song "Millennium Fever", which includes the line, "I've been dreaming of freezing my mind in California", where Alcor was based until 1994. Contact details for Alcor subsequently appeared on the sleeve of the single "(Don't Fear) The Reaper", a cover of the Blue Öyster Cult song.

=== Omega Point ===
The song "Omega Point" references the religious concept of the same name, and features a quote from Barrow and Tipler's The Anthropic Cosmological Principle.

=== Krupa ===
Their 1996 song is a homage to the Polish-American drummer Gene Krupa and his improvised style of drumming.

=== Charles Bukowski ===
On the album Electro Glide in Blue, track 6 called "Tears of the Gods" (6:18) features audio quotes from the 1970s video performance "Bukowski at Bellevue". The quotes are all taken from a piece entitled "Soup, Cosmos, and Tears." (A transcription of the video can be found at the Blithering Savant blog.)

=== Slavoj Žižek ===
The song "Love is Evil", on the album The Future's What It Used to Be, contains samples from the Slovenian philosopher Slavoj Žižek.
