= (Don't Fear) The Reaper =

1976 single by Blue Öyster Cult

Single by Blue Öyster Cult

from the album Agents of Fortune
- B-side: "Tattoo Vampire"
- Released: July 1976
- Recorded: 1975
- Genre: Hard rock; psychedelic rock; soft rock
- Length: 5:08 (album version); 3:45 (single edit)
- Label: Columbia
- Songwriter: Donald "Buck Dharma" Roeser
- Producers: David Lucas; Murray Krugman; Sandy Pearlman

Blue Öyster Cult singles chronology
"Then Came the Last Days of May" (1975)	"(Don't Fear) The Reaper" (1976)	"This Ain't the Summer of Love" (1976)

Official audio
- "(Don't Fear) The Reaper" on YouTube

"(Don't Fear) The Reaper" is a song by the American rock band Blue Öyster Cult from the 1976 album Agents of Fortune. Written and sung by the lead guitarist, Donald "Buck Dharma" Roeser, it deals with eternal love and the inevitability of death. Dharma wrote it while picturing an early death for himself.

Released as an edited single (omitting the slow building interlude in the original), the song is Blue Öyster Cult's highest chart success, reaching #7 in Cash Box and #12 on the Billboard Hot 100 in late 1976. Critical reception was positive and in December 2003 "(Don't Fear) The Reaper" was listed at number 405 on Rolling Stone's list of the top 500 songs of all time.

== Background ==
The song is about the inevitability of death and the foolishness of fearing it. The singer and lead guitarist, Donald "Buck Dharma" Roeser, wrote it while thinking about what would happen if he died at a young age. He used Romeo and Juliet as an example of a couple who wanted to be together in the afterlife.

Lyrics such as "Romeo and Juliet are together in eternity" led many listeners to interpret the song to be about a murder–suicide pact. Dharma said he was appalled that some listeners interpreted the song as encouraging suicide. He instead meant the lyrics as a plea not to fear death, as opposed to actively bringing it about, and said it was "a love song where the love transcends the actual physical existence of the partners".

== Composition and recording ==
"(Don't Fear) The Reaper" was written and sung by Dharma and produced by David Lucas, Murray Krugman, and Sandy Pearlman. The song's distinctive guitar riff is built on the I-bVII-bVI chord progression in A minor. The riff was recorded with Krugman's Gibson ES-175 guitar, which was run through a Music Man 410 combo amplifier, and Dharma's vocals were captured with a Telefunken U47 tube microphone. The guitar solo and guitar rhythm sections were recorded in one take, while a four-track tape machine amplified them on the recording. Recording engineer Shelly Yakus remembers piecing together the separate vocals, guitar and rhythm section into a master track, with the overdubbing occurring in that order.

Mojo described its creation: "'Guys, this is it!' engineer Shelly Yakus announced at the end of the first take. 'The legendary once-in-a-lifetime groove!' ... What evolved in the studio was the extended solo section; it took them nearly as long to edit the five-minute track down to manageable length as it did to record it."

The song features the cowbell percussion instrument overdubbed on the original recording. Bassist Joe Bouchard remembered the producer requesting that his brother, drummer Albert Bouchard, play the cowbell: "Albert thought he was crazy. But he put all this tape around a cowbell and played it. It really pulled the track together." However, both producer David Lucas and bandmember Eric Bloom claim credit for the performance.

== Reception ==
The song was on the Billboard Hot 100 chart for 20 weeks, reaching number 12 for the weeks of November 6 and November 13, 1976. It was the band's highest-charting U.S. song and helped Agents of Fortune reach number 29 on the Billboard 200. "(Don't Fear) The Reaper" charted even higher in Canada, peaking at number 7. The single edit was released in the UK in July 1976 (CBS 4483) but failed to chart. The unedited album version was released as a single (CBS 6333) in May 1978, where it reached number 16 on the UK Singles Chart.

The song received critical acclaim. Record World said that "An 'Eight Miles High' guitar line is complemented by smooth vocals." Denise Sullivan of AllMusic praised the song's "gentle vocals and virtuoso guitar" and "haunting middle break which delivers the listener straight back to the heart of the song once the thunder is finished". Nathan Beckett called it the band's "masterpiece" and compared the vocals to the Beach Boys. Writing for PopMatters, James Mann called it a "landmark, genre-defining masterpiece" that was "as grand and emotional as American rock and roll ever got". Pitchfork also called the song a masterpiece. In 2020, Classic Rock wrote the song "remained one of the most instantly recognisable tracks in the whole genre, and it continues to turn up in surprising places even today".

== Track listing ==
7" Vinyl

1. "(Don't Fear) The Reaper" (Roeser) – 3:45
2. "Tattoo Vampire" (Albert Bouchard, Helen Robbins) – 2:40

== Personnel ==
- Eric Bloom – guitar, backing vocals
- Donald "Buck Dharma" Roeser – guitar, lead vocals
- Allen Lanier – keyboards, guitar
- Joe Bouchard – bass
- Albert Bouchard – drums, percussion, cowbell

with:

- Michael and Randy Brecker – horns (their contribution appears only on the extended album track and was edited out of the released single)
- David Lucas – backing vocals, keyboards, percussion

== Charts ==
Chart (1976–1978)	Peak position
Canada Top Singles (RPM)	7
Ireland (IRMA)	17
UK Singles (Official Charts)	16
US Billboard Hot 100	12

Chart (2017–2025)	Peak position
US Hot Rock & Alternative Songs (Billboard)	9

== Certifications ==
Region	Certification	Certified units/sales
United Kingdom (BPI)	Platinum	600,000^{‡}
United States (RIAA)	6× Platinum	6,000,000^{‡}
^{‡} Sales+streaming figures based on certification alone.

== Covers ==
- New Zealand band the Mutton Birds recorded a version for the soundtrack of Peter Jackson's film The Frighteners. In 1997, it peaked at No. 48 on the Australian ARIA singles charts, the only Mutton Birds single to chart in Australia.
- English electronic music group Apollo 440 released a cover version in their 1995 album Millennium Fever.

== Accolades ==
In 1976 Rolling Stone named "(Don't Fear) The Reaper" the song of the year, and in 2004 the magazine placed the song 397th on its list of "The 500 Greatest Songs of All Time"; the 2010 version of the list moved it down to 405th. In 1997 Mojo listed the song as the 80th-best single of all time, while Q ranked it 404th in its 2003 countdown of the "1001 Best Songs Ever."

When The Guardian released its unranked list of "1000 Songs Everyone Must Hear" in 2009, the song was included. The publication wrote that the song's charm "lies in the disjuncture between its gothic storyline and the sprightly, Byrdsian guitar line that carries it." In his book The Heart of Rock and Soul: The 1001 Greatest Singles Ever Made, rock critic Dave Marsh ranked the song 997th.

== Legacy ==
=== "More Cowbell" ===
The song was memorialized in the April 2000 Saturday Night Live comedy sketch "More Cowbell". The six-minute sketch presents a fictionalized version of the recording of "(Don't Fear) The Reaper" on an episode of VH1's Behind the Music. Will Ferrell wrote the sketch and played Gene Frenkle, a cowbell player. "Legendary" producer Bruce Dickinson, played by Christopher Walken, asked Frenkle to "really explore the studio space" and up the ante on his cowbell playing. The rest of the band is visibly annoyed by Frenkle, but Dickinson tells everyone, "I got a fever, and the only prescription is more cowbell!" Buck Dharma said that the sketch was fantastic and he never gets tired of it but also lamented that it made the song lose its "creepy" vibe for some time.

Red Hot Chili Peppers performed a segment of the song on May 22, 2014, as the conclusion of a drumming contest between Ferrell and the band's drummer, Chad Smith. As in the SNL sketch, Ferrell played cowbell for the rendition, which appeared on an episode of The Tonight Show Starring Jimmy Fallon.

=== In other media ===
Stephen King cited the song as one of his inspirations for his novel The Stand. He began the novel a year earlier, in 1975, but developed writer's block. The song was released around that time and its lyrics are quoted at the novel's beginning. It also appears as the opening theme song for the 1994 TV miniseries based on the novel, and was used as the end credits music for the fifth episode of the 2020–21 miniseries adaptation.

In the 1978 film Halloween, the song plays in the car when Jamie Lee Curtis's and Nancy Kyes's characters, Laurie Strode and Annie Brackett, are being stalked by serial killer Michael Myers. It is the only licensed song featured in the film. It is used again in the 2022 sequel Halloween Ends, playing over the final scene and ending credits.

In the 1994 book The Discworld Companion, by Terry Pratchett and Stephen Briggs, the family motto of Mort of Sto Helit is revealed to be "Non Timetis Messor", dog Latin for "don't fear the reaper". This is referenced again in Pratchett's 1997 novel Hogfather, the first reference in the mainline Discworld series. In 2010, Hubert Chesshyre designed Pratchett's coat of arms, which features the motto "Noli Timere Messorem", a corrected Latin translation of "don't fear the reaper".

The 1994 film The Stoned Age features the song when a character calls it "a pussy song" despite being performed by Blue Oyster Cult. The 2006 video game Prey features the song playing on a jukebox as Jen's bar is attacked.

The song was featured in the first-season episode "Faith" (2006) of the television series Supernatural, accompanying a scene in which a Reaper pursues a woman through the woods.

The 2013 television series Orange Is the New Black features the song in Episode 26 (the last episode of Season 2) before the end credits roll.

The 2020 video game Cyberpunk 2077 features a secret main quest named after the song. As one of the requirements to access this quest, the player must wait on the rooftop featured in the previous quest for 5 minutes and 8 seconds, the exact length of the original song.

The 2021 video game Returnal features the song playing in the background while Selene is driving.

The 2022 horror film X by A24 has the song playing on the protagonists' van radio at the film's climactic midpoint. The slasher nature of the scene, as well as the film's setting in 1979, suggests an intentional homage by director Ti West to Halloween.

The 2022 television series Reacher features the song in (Season 4, Episode 6) as the protagonist and costar await their death before the end credits roll.

The 2nd season of television series Wednesday (2025) features the cello solo arrangement for the song in Episode 6 and the cello pop arrangement sang by Bella Poarch on original soundtrack.

The song was featured in the video game Fortnite Festival.

The trailer for a 2026 television series Crystal Lake, using the song.
