= Morita =

Morita may refer to:

== Places ==
- Morita, Aomori, a village in Japan
- Morita, Togo, a town in Togo

== Other uses ==
- Morita (surname)
- A type of chipotle
- A fictional assault rifle from the film Starship Troopers
- Morita Shogi 64, a Nintendo 64 game

== See also ==
- Morita conjectures
- Morita equivalence
- Morita therapy
