= Morada (company) =

British curtain manufacturer, in Altham, Lancashire

Morada Home Limited
- Company type: Private
- Industry: Household Goods
- Founded: London 1876
- Headquarters: Altham, Lancashire, England
- Products: Morada Home, Morada 1876, Vogue Fabrics, Morada Curtains and Accessories

Morada Limited is a textile company based in Altham, Lancashire. Morada specializes in curtains.

== 1876 to 1950s ==
The founding company of B. Cohen & Co., was established in Hanbury Street, Whitechapel, London, EC1 in 1876. At this time Hanbury Street was the epicentre of the Jewish community in East London. From the 1891 Census it is evident that the multiplicity of trades in this street was remarkable, they included; a licensed victualler, a fishmonger, a cap maker, a tailor and tailoress, a china & glass dealer, a market porter, a van guard, a mantle maker, a purveyor of horse flesh, a moulder in clay, a rough packing case maker, a silversmith, a carman, a lighterman, an upholsterer, a bonnet maker, a milk dairyman, a cheesemonger, a newsagents, a shoe maker, a waterproof garment maker, a cabinet maker, a coffin maker, a cigar maker, a stick maker, a furrier and a comb maker. However to "Londoners", Hanbury Street was the 'home' of the tailoring industry. Fittingly, the five Cohen brothers sold tailor's trimmings; cotton, needles, bias binding and all other requisites of the tailoring trade including linings.

=== Monomers, Rayon, Dacron and Artificial Silk ===
The Cohen brothers were looking for a commercial edge and became aware, in 1894, that Charles Cross, Edward Bevan and Clayton Beadle had patented their "artificial silk" which they named "Viscose" in the UK and "Rayon" in the US, and sold under the trade name "Dacron". Although natural polymers have been with around since time began, synthetic polymers are more recent and owe their origin to Alexander Parkes and his exhibits at the International Exhibition in London in 1862. The most basic building block of a polymer is a monomer, which, when combined with oxygen, nitrogen, chlorine, or fluoride, becomes a "polymers". The most important polymer, for fabric construction is Polyethylene terephthalate, more commonly known as "polyester". The bright vibrant synthetic fabrics made from these synthetic "building blocks" exhibit a silk "handle"; and all the comfort properties of natural fibres, imitating silk, wool and linen.

B. Cohen & Co. pioneered the use of these synthetic fabrics as lining materials and took the market by storm as expensive silk was substituted for these new fabrics. By the 1950s, B. Cohen & Co. along with Collins and Cawthorn, were the foremost merchant converters in Europe, with ranges of lining fabrics woven and dyed to their own specification. The major supplier of loom state fabric to both companies was Carrington & Dewhurst of Eccleston near Chorley; who were also innovators in the production of cellulosic and synthetic fibres. These complex fabrics were dyed by Thomas Robinson, a traditional northern dye house owned by B. Cohen & Co at Ramsbottom, Lancashire. Thomas Robinson with the help of ICI had developed nylon and polyester and then futuristic spun fabric blends of viscose and acetate. With their fine silk handle and vibrant colour these fabrics proved to be ideal for lining garments. It is estimated that around 1,700,000,000 garments were made with linings sold under the brand name Morada.

As B. Cohen & Co. grew, it moved premises, first to Berwick Street and then to Upper James Street; by the 1940s the company concentrated almost exclusively on the sale of "synthetics" for use as linings for ladies and gentlemen's apparel.

== 1960s to 1980s ==
By the 1960s Morada was a "banker brand" and the Cohen Brothers operated from prestigious offices in Poultney Street, London, W1. With no obvious succession the brothers sold the business to Carrington & Dewhurst. There followed a rapid period of merger and acquisition. At this time ICI was a major shareholder in Carrington & Dewhurst and also Viyella International. The two companies were later merged and Morada became a division of Carrington Viyella.

In the 1980s, Sir David Alliance appeared on the scene with his fledgling company Vantona. Vantona made an audacious bid for a company eight times its size; Carrington Viyella, who by then were manufactures of garments, home furnishings, carpets and fabrics. Morada, Dorma, Van Heusen and Viyella were the cluster of famous brands owned by the group. After a rapid takeover, Morada became part of a new company – Vantona Viyella. A few years later the Carrington element became the filament weaving division with the lining sales division known as Carrington Morada. Some years later Vantona Viyella merged with Coats Patons, and in so doing Morada became part of one of the most prominent English textile companies ever formed – Coats Viyella.

== 1990s to the present day ==
As globalisation spread and English textiles companies came under pressure to compete to survive, Coats Viyella divested certain operations. In the late 1990s the present management bought the company and in 2005 secured funding from EPIC Private Equity to re-establish the Morada name as fabric brand.
