= Noko =

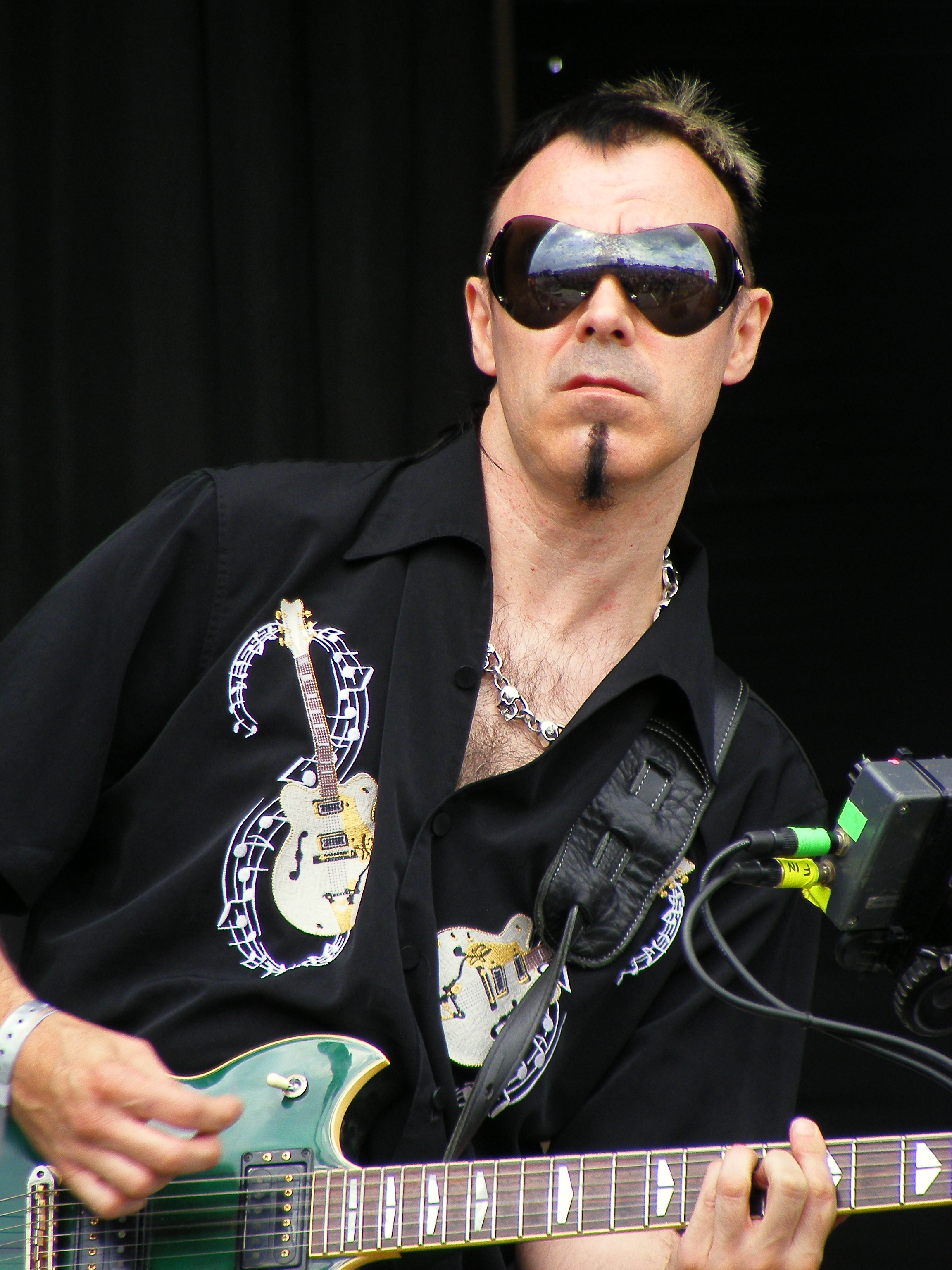
- Noko performing with Magazine in 2011

Background information
- Also known as: Noko, Noko 440
- Born: Norman Fisher-Jones; 1 February 1962 (age 64); Bootle, Merseyside, England
- Genres: Electronic, new wave, post-punk
- Occupations: Musician, composer, producer
- Instruments: Guitar, bass, keyboards
- Years active: 1980–present
- Website: MySpace: Noko 440

Noko (born Norman Fisher-Jones; 1 February 1962) is an English musician, multi-instrumentalist, composer and producer who has formed and/or played with a number of bands primarily as a guitarist or bassist. In chronological order they were: Alvin the Aardvark and the Fuzzy Ants, the Umbrella, the Pete Shelley Group, the Cure, Luxuria, Apollo 440, Stealth Sonic Soul, Fast, Maximum Roach, James Maker and Noko 440 (also known as Frankenstein), Magazine, Raw Chimp, Levyathan, SCISM, Am I Dead Yet? and Buzzcocks (at the Pete Shelley Memorial concert at London's Royal Albert Hall in 2019).

== Biography ==
In 1980, he formed his first band, Alvin the Aardvark & the Fuzzy Ants, who played their first gig on 16 January 1981 on After All That…This, a Granada TV show presented by Nick Turnbull. Despite the DJ John Peel being a fan of their music, they never released any material, recording only an unreleased single at Open Eye Studios, in Liverpool and playing a few gigs in the North-West, most notably supporting Cabaret Voltaire at Nathan McGough's Plato's Ballroom in 1981, before disbanding the same year.

Noko was hired by The Cure as bassist, for a one-off concert in Germany at Alabamahalle, Munich, filmed for television on 30.01.1984 and a live promotional 2-song TV appearance on BBC Oxford Road Show 24.02.1984. In addition he also recorded a 4-song radio session with the band on 02.02.1984 at BBC Maida Vale Studios for David Jensen, which was broadcast on 22.02.1984. He also formed two bands, Dynamo Futurista and The Umbrella. The latter group, consisting of Noko (guitar and vocals), Simon Hoare (drums), Mark Sanderson (bass) and James Gardner, released a total of three songs before folding, which were released on an EP called Make Hell (For The Beautiful People).

Founder Buzzcock and Magazine frontman, Howard Devoto, started writing with Noko in 1986 with a view to putting a band together to play Factory Records' Festival of the Tenth Summer at the G-Mex arena in Manchester that summer to commemorate the tenth anniversary of Punk. They played a short set as Adultery, borrowing backline from the Smiths. (Noko also played a set with Pete Shelley at the same gig in a line-up that also included ex-Magazine drummer John Doyle).

The line-up for that Adultery show was: Howard Devoto – vocals, Noko – lead guitar/viola, Leroy James – keyboards/2nd guitar, Pete Kinski – bass, Simon Hoare – drums. Signing to Beggars Banquet in 1987 and deciding on the name Luxuria, Devoto and Noko released two LPs: Unanswerable Lust (1988) and Beastbox (1990) and toured Europe and USA throughout 1988 with a line-up of Devoto and Noko on vocals/guitars and viola as usual and Karl Leiker – bass, Mark Rowlett – Drums/Sequential Studio 440, James Gardner – keyboards, programming, Frog – guitar/keyboards. The final Luxuria gig at The Town & Country Club (now the London Forum) in London featured cameo appearances by Barry Adamson (bass) on a rendition of Magazine's "The Light Pours Out of Me" for an encore, and Morrissey, who read a passage of Marcel Proust's "À la recherche du temps perdu" over the intro of "Mademoiselle" before throwing the tattered book into the crowd as the band kicked into the song. (There is a bootleg recording of the gig in circulation).

When Luxuria folded in 1990, Noko got together with school friends, brothers Trevor Gray and Howard Gray, and James Gardner and formed Apollo 440.

The band released a number of singles and EPs on their own StealthSonic Recordings label: "Lolita" (1990), "Destiny" (1991), "Blackout" (1992) and "Lolita/Destiny '92" (1992).

Apollo 440 made four albums: Millennium Fever (1995), ElectroGlide In Blue (1997), Gettin' High On Your Own Supply (1999), and Dude Descending A Staircase (2003) on Sony Records. The band have been playing live in one form or another since their inception in 1990 to the present day and chronologically the touring line-ups are as follows: 1990–1992: The band featured all founding members on keyboards, sequencers and drum machines and MCs Stevie Hyper-D and Tigga-Max guesting from time to time on vocals.

1993–1995: James Gardner left for New Zealand where he has since established himself as a prominent composer writing music for his ensemble 175 East. Noko moved over to electric guitar and lead vocals, Trevor Gray on keyboards, Howard Gray on bass, and ex-Modern Eon drummer Cliff Hewitt was added to the line-up first on electronic, then onto acoustic drums. (Kenny Cougar briefly replaced Rej on bass during 1999).

1996–2000: Noko – guitar, Trevor Gray – keyboards, Howard Gray – vibe controller/live-mix, Cliff Hewitt – drums, Paul Kodish – drums, Reinallt Ap Gwynnedd – bass, Mary Byker (ex-Gaye Bykers on Acid) – lead vocals, Harry-K – DJ/vocals. Simeon Bowring from A1 People replaced Rej on bass for a number of European festivals in 2000.

2007–2008: Noko – guitar, Trevor Gray – keyboards, Howard Gray – vibe controller/live-mix. Cliff Hewitt – drums, Reinallt Ap Gwynnedd – bass, Ewan MacFarlane – lead vocals, Ashley Krajewski – MPC/keyboards.

2008–present: Chuck Sabo briefly replaced Cliff Hewitt on drums in 2008 (and again in 2009) as Cliff had touring commitments with German artist Schiller; Steve Barney did the same in early 2010 and Mikey Cusick (who had previously played with Noko in Maximum Roach from 2004 to 2005) replaced Rej on bass in 2008 and remains the current Apollo 440 bassman.

The 2010 Apollo 440 touring line-up: Noko – guitar, Trevor Gray – keyboards, Howard Gray – vibe controller/live-mix. Cliff Hewitt – drums, Mikey Cusick – bass/vocals, Ewan MacFarlane – lead vocals, Ashley Krajewski – MPC/keyboards/vocals.

2004 saw Noko in a two-man band with James Maker. The band released only one EP via Morrissey's Attack imprint (I'm Unbearable/Born That Way) and the two musicians parted early 2005 after touring with a full band line-up on Morrissey's European and UK dates including his Meltdown festival appearance at the Royal Festival Hall supporting the newly reformed New York Dolls. That line-up included Paul Kodish on drums, Simeon Bowring on bass, and Ashley Krajewski on keyboards.

In 2007, he was credited as a co-composer of two Siouxsie Sioux songs, "About to Happen" and "Loveless", which were included on the album Mantaray.

In November 2008, Noko was announced as the guitarist of the reformed Magazine, joining his former collaborators Howard Devoto, Barry Adamson, John Doyle and Dave Formula.

In summer 2009, Magazine played "The Soap Show: Episode 2009" at the Royal Festival Hall. It was shown in two halves, the first of which was The Correct Use Of Soap LP in its original running order followed by the B-sides and the song "Upside Down" which had never been performed live before. They also played selected European festivals with a set culled from the "Real Life & Thereafter" tour. The band rounded off the year's activities with appearances on BBC TV's Later... with Jools Holland and the BBC Electric Proms. Magazine released a live DVD and CD, Real Life & Thereafter: Live at Manchester Academy 17.02.09.

2009 also saw the completion and release of Noko's first full movie score. Une Affaire D'etat, a French-language political thriller based on best-selling novel Nos Fantastiques Années Fric by Dominique Manotti was directed by Éric Valette and stars André Dussollier, Thierry Frémont and Rachida Brakni. European cinema release was in October of that year. A soundtrack CD is available on Milan Musique.

2010 also saw the formation of Raw Chimp with Noko (guitar/vocals), his wife Deborah Fisher-Jones (bass), and Constance Kaler (lead vocals). Raw Chimp played their live debut that same year at the Download Festival.

Noko also scored Éric Valette's next movie, The Prey which was released in France in April 2011 with worldwide distribution to follow later in 2012. Another French-language thriller, it was written by Laurent Turner and the movie's producer Luc Bossi, The Prey stars Albert Dupontel, Alice Taglioni, Stéphane Debac and Sergi Lopez. It's a dark high-octane edgy chase movie starting in a prison and culminating in a tense mountain denouement. The score is essential orchestral with touches of electronica and a multitude of Noko's trademark guitar-textures. The soundtrack CD is again available on Milan Musique.

Magazine completed their No Thyself LP at the end of 2011, the first new material from the band since 1981's Magic, Murder and the Weather, which was released on the Wire-Sound label. The band toured the UK in November. The LP and tour and BBC radio session were the first to feature new bass-player Stan White who replaced Barry Adamson.

Apollo 440's fifth LP The Future's What It Used to Be was released at the beginning of 2012 and the group continue to play live.

In 2012, Noko stepped in on bass guitar and backing vocals with London neo-grunge trio Levyathan, alongside Simon Maxwell on drums and David Norris on guitar and lead vocals. The band recorded a Noko-produced debut LP later that year at Apollo Control but it was never released.

In February 2013, Noko and Brad Lee from Discoordinated performed at Matthew Glamorre's multi-media series of art-happenings, C.R.U.X. at Zero-One Gallery in Hopkins St. Soho, London W1. They revisited their 2-man version of Roxy Music's classic, "In Every Dream Home a Heartache", last performed in 2007.

In March 2013, Noko composed and performed his one-man live music score on electric guitar to Theatre Of Post Eroticism's production of BDSM Faust : an adaption of Johann Wolfgang Goethe's 1808 "Faust" (Part 1). There was another UK run of the production in June and the show was performed in Romania later in the year.

In 2014, Noko co-wrote/ co-produced some tracks for Japanese guitarist Tomoyasu Hotei's LP New Beginnings (released in Japan Virgin/Universal TYCT-60046). These were "Sons Of Sorrow", "New Chemical" and "Barrel Of My Own Gun". Noko played bass guitar on "Sons Of Sorrow" and "Barrel Of My Own Gun" and vocals on "Barrel of my own Gun" and "New Chemical". When Hotei later signed to Universal's Spinefarm imprint, this LP was repackaged with some extra tracks for release outside of Japan as Strangers (SPINE663762) and included a re-worked version of "New Chemical" titled "Move It", featuring a lead vocal by Richard Z. Kruspe from Rammstein. It was at Noko's suggestion that Hotei approached Iggy Pop to sing two other tracks on the album, which became "How The Cookie Crumbles" and "Walking Through The Night".

Hotei and Noko have been friends since 1997, first meeting when Apollo 440 remixed one of Hotei's tracks. They share a birthday, having both been born on exactly the same day, 1 February 1962. Since 2014 Noko has periodically toured with Hotei in Europe, U.S. and Japan, playing bass guitar in various line-ups, including drummers Steve Barney, Cliff Hewitt and Zachary Alford.

Later in 2014, Noko produced and mixed Pop Will Eat Itself's "Reclaim The Game (Funk FIFA)" unofficial Brazil World Cup 2014 theme featuring Brazilian rap artist BNegão.

Noko went on to produce and mix some tracks for the band's 2015 Anti-Nasty League album (RUMJOINT0005): "Sacrifice And Pain", "Director's Cut" and "Mental Pollution" (to which he had a writing contribution), playing additional guitar, bass and various keyboard/programming enhancements along the way. This led to the band he formed with Brad Lee, $HirtLiftA supporting PWEI on their UK tour that summer: Brad Lee on vocals, Noko on guitar and Frank Horovich on guitar and electronics.

In 2016, Noko reunited with Matthew Glamorre to form SCISM, the 'house-band' at his SCISM audio-visual, multi-media art-happening nightclub on EU Referendum night in London. They recorded and released "Dalston Bump" to coincide with a series of events at Vogue Fabrics in Dalston. In Summer 2017 SCISM played a set at Churchtown festival in Cornwall and again in September at The Bargehouse in London as part of Open London weekend.

In April 2017, Magazine released the vinyl-only "Old World Charm" (WIRED42) : 6 tracks recorded at the BBC Electric Proms at Roundhouse, London in 2009. The Graeme Oxby pic on the rear of the sleeve featured Noko's MXR 'flanger-on-a-stick'.

Noko composed and produced the music score for director Darren Cavanagh's feature-length documentary Ex-Dominatrix, for release in December 2017. The movie opened the 2019 London Fetish Film Festival, at which it won Best Feature.

In 2017, Noko and Mary Byker started work recording a body of songs that would become the debut Am I Dead Yet? album, which was released on the Wire-Sound label in April 2019 (WIRED#48). A 5-track remix EP, “Never Mind The Bolex…Am I Dead Yet? reimagined on 35mm”(WIRED#49), which featured cinematic dub remixes of some of the album highlights, was released as a download only, free with advance-orders of the album during the crowd-fun run-up to the actual release. Live dates promoting the album saw the live line-up expanded with the addition of Cliff Hewitt from Apollo 440 on drums and Derek ‘Hoodlum Priest’ Thompson on bass guitar.

== Other appearances ==
The nature of the Apollo 440 remix and production process means Noko has played on too many records by other artists to list usefully here.

StealthSonicSoul was an alter-ego spin-off project by the three members of Apollo 440. One release "StealthSonicSoul" came out in 1992 on Scottish 23rd Precinct affiliated Limbo label. A further track "StealthSonic Sun In Her Hair" appeared on a Limbo compilation the following year.

The EZ Drum & Bass Orchestra consisted of Noko and Frederick Pasquan and made one commercially available EP "Beat Girl" b/w "EZ Beat Girl" and "Slow Beat Girl" on the Sliced label in 1996.

The duo also remixed a number of other artists e.g. "Carrerra Rapida -EZ Drum&Bass Orchestra Remix" by Apollo 440 on Sony in 1997.

Noko played bass in 1991 on the Total Abandon EP and Jubilee Twist LP in 1992 by The Heart Throbs, a group from Reading who folded in 1993. Noko played a number of gigs with the band in 1991 and was in the line up that was joined onstage on 25 October of that year by Only Ones frontman, Peter Perrett at Underworld, Camden Town, London, for a version of The Only Ones' "Lovers Of Today" along with a few other songs.

In the same year, he played abstract guitar on the song "Ventriloquists and Dolls" from Momus's album Hippopotamomus.

In 1992, Noko produced the one and only LP by Hyperhead, Metaphasia, which came out on the Devotion label. The band was formed by Mary Byker. After Gaye Bykers on Acid split, Mary joined and toured with industrial supergroup Pigface before forming Hyperhead, which included contributions from his Pigface colleagues Martin Atkins (also formerly of PiL and Killing Joke) and William Tucker (also previously of Revolting Cocks and My Life With the Thrill Kill Kult), along with bassist Karl Leiker (who had previously played with Noko in Luxuria) and guitarist Paul Dalloway.

Also in 1992, Noko collaborated with Stuart Crichton as Johnny Potatohead, releasing a single, "Johnny Potatohead" on Reverb Records.

On 14 July 1998, Apollo 440 played "La Nuit Electronique" concert with Jean Michel Jarre, with whom they had collaborated twice that year : firstly on the single "Rendezvous '98" (which became the ITV World Cup Theme in UK and reached #10 in the singles chart) and an @440 remix of "Oxygene 10". Apollo performed the two tracks live onstage with JMJ in front of the Eiffel Tower to an audience of over 600,000. It was Bastille Day and only two days before, France had won the World Cup. Immediately after they won on 12th, the Mayor of Paris asked Jarre to put together this impromptu free concert for the people of Paris to extend the euphoria. At the climax of the show, an enormous firework display went off on the Eiffel tower behind the stage. This was the largest concert Noko has ever played. Noko and both Gray brothers all played synthesiser and Jean Michel Jarre played theremin.

From 2002 to 2004, Noko was involved as Producer/Musical Director for The Prada Meinhof Gang, an all-female Art-Terrorist troupe active between 2002 and 2004, whose activities included performance/installations at the Venice Biennalle, Tate Britain, ICA etc. Their track "Want Is Your Master" was included on the free CD compilation that accompanied the "Music" issue of Modern Painters magazine.

In March 2007, Apollo 440 played the "A Tribute To Billy MacKenzie" charity concert at Shepherd's Bush Empire alongside British Electric Foundation (their first ever live show), Glenn Gregory (Heaven 17), Claudia Brücken (Propaganda), Paul Humphreys (OMD) and Paul Haig, amongst others. It was 10 years after his death.

Apollo, with Ewan MacFarlane on vocals closed the show with "Pain In Any Language" from their 2nd LP Electroglide In Blue. This collaboration was the last song MacKenzie finished before his tragic suicide only weeks later. The Apollo set also included their cover of The Smiths' "William, it was really nothing" - the only time it was ever performed live.

Noko made his feature-film debut with a brief cameo appearance as an accordion-playing Parisian street musician in Éric Valette's Une Affaire D'Etat movie in 2009. He also had a cameo in Éric Valette's next movie La Proie in 2011 as a harpsichord player in a music-recital scene set in a prison which culminates in a full-scale riot.

In 2011, Noko contributed guitar to two tracks on The Organ of Corti, an LP by Magazine's Dave Formula and cellist Christine Hanson.

After the passing of Pete Shelley in December 2018, Noko was asked to perform with the current Buzzcocks, Steve Diggle, Danny Farrant and Chris Remington, at a special memorial concert at London's Royal Albert Hall on 21 June. The concert featured original Buzzcocks drummer John Maher and bassist Steve Garvey alongside a number of special guests, including Pauline Murray (Penetration), Captain Sensible (The Damned), Thurston Moore (Sonic Youth), Peter Perrett (The Only Ones), Richard Jobson (Skids), Dave Vanian (The Damned) and Tim Burgess (The Charlatans). Noko played Pete Shelley's guitar parts and solos for the duration of the show, which was MC'd by Paul Morley and included tributes by original Buzzcocks manager and New Hormones label founder Richard Boon, original Buzzcock Howard Devoto, who provided a short film featuring a world premiere of a Buzzkunst track that he'd recorded with Pete, but was never released and, to end the show, a eulogy and special thanks from Pete's wife Greta. Appropriately, Noko played two songs, "Boredom" and "Time's Up" on a red 1960s Starway guitar - the same model made famous by Pete during the early Spiral Scratch days of the band, with its missing top-section.

== Equipment ==
For Apollo 440 live, throughout the late 1990s Noko used the following guitars: a green Parker Fly Classic, a blue Parker Fly Deluxe and a pink Fender 1962 reissue Stratocaster through a pair of Digitech 2112 rack FX units, an 1980s Roland GP-8 and Fender Twins, but whilst the guitars remain the same, the preamps have been upgraded to Digitech GSP 1101 units with Control 2 foot controller through either a Marshall JCM2000 TSL through a Marshall 1960AX 4x12" cab or a Marshall EL34 50/50 power-amp and a pair of 4x12"s

Noko's 2017 @440 rig was the same three guitars into a Kemper Powerack (Fender Tube Reverb tank in FX loop) into a Marshall 1936 2 x 12" cab with a pedalboard incorporating Kemper Remote, a Boss DM-3 and a Boss FT-2 in conjunction with two EV-5 expression pedals.

While he was touring with Magazine in 2009, Noko used a pair of green Yamaha SG1500 guitars with an MXR dyna comp, MXR flanger, Boss DM-3 and Boss PS-5. The flanger was stand-mounted as per John McGeoch and Robin Simon's setup with the band in the late 1970s. For amplification, Noko used two late 1970s Marshall JMP 2x12" combos with Marshall 4x12'cabinets and a Fender Twin. A Variax 700 Acoustic was used for the intro of "I Want To Burn Again" through another late 1970s MXR flanger.

Noko used a 1978 Black Ovation Magnum II bass guitar with Levyathan through a Boss CE-2 and boss OC-2 into a Sansamp Bass Driver and EBS Fafner Bass rig. A jetglow '74 Rickenbacker 4001 was used for one or two gigs during his time with the band.

Whilst on tour with Tomoyasu Hotei, Noko's bass rig was as follows : Ibanez Black Eagle(Reissue), 1978 Antoria Snow Eagle, 1982 G&L L-1000(natural), 1978 Ovation Magnum II (black) into : EBS Fafner MkI through EBS Neo 210 and EBS Neo 115 cabs, with the top-end (up an octave through electroharmonix POG2) split through Kemper Powerack into Marshall 1936 cab.

Noko's 2019 live rig for both Apollo 440 and Am I Dead Yet? is the same 3 guitars into the Kemper and either a Mission Engineering Gemini GM-2 FRFR system, or a Matrix GT800FX stereo power amp and stereo Marshall 1960 4x12"cab(s) for international shows. His pedalboard now includes an Xotic EP boost and the Boss FT-2 and Fender reverb tank have gone. Two Gretsch White Falcons (single and double cut-aways) were used extensively during the making of the Am I Dead Yet? album, but not live shows, so far.

For the Pete Shelley Memorial show with The Buzzcocks at London's Royal Albert Hall, he used Pete's old Marshall JCM-900 and a sunburst late '70s Ibanez AR-300 Artist, his green Yamaha SG-1500 and a red 1960s Starway J-1. The only pedals were MXR Flanger, Xotic EP boost and Boss Hyper Fuzz.
